= Marjorie Wilkes =

American librarian, inker, and comic book letterer (born 1889)

- Born: December 29, 1889; Atlanta, Georgia
- Died: 1986; Massachusetts
- Occupations: Librarian, inker, letterer
- Known for: Creation of Wonder Woman

Marjorie Wilkes (born December 29, 1889), also known as Marjorie Wilkes Huntley, was an American librarian, comic book inker and letterer. She worked alongside William Moulton Marston and H. G. Peter on the original Wonder Woman stories.

== Life and career ==
Wilkes was born on 29 December 1889, in Atlanta, Georgia as the daughter of Samuel and Georgia Wilkes. From an early age, she held strong ideals associated with women's suffrage and the suffragette movement, and met with the renowned suffragist and birth control activist Ethel Byrne.

Around 1941, Wilkes entered the comic book industry. She became one of the creators of the original Wonder Woman stories, which debuted in the All Star Comics #8 in December 1941. While William Moulton Marston wrote the story, H. G. Peter did the artwork, and Wilkes was responsible for inking, lettering, and transcribing the scripts. She was later described as the person who knew the most about the production process of the Wonder Woman comics.

== Personal life ==
For much of his adult life, Marston was in a polyamorous relationship with his wife, lawyer and psychologist Elizabeth Holloway, and homemaker and psychology student Olive Byrne. Wilkes occasionally lived with them, staying in a room in the attic. According to Holloway, all the information about the nature of the relationship amongst them was contained in a series of documents kept by Wilkes, who later decided to destroy them, stating, "The world is not ready for this. I have to destroy it". Researcher Jill Lepore, however, raised doubts whether this destruction was eventually carried out. Wilkes was also responsible for introducing the members of the relationship group to BDSM (bondage, domination, submission, and sadomasochism), which strongly influenced the Wonder Woman stories.

Wilkes had no children and died alone in a care home.

== Recognition ==
Les Daniels wrote about Wilkes in the second chapter, "The Amazon", of his 2000 book Wonder Woman: The Complete History. In the book, Olive Marston, the daughter of William Marston and Elizabeth Holloway, who lost her husband to influenza and subsequently came to live with the Marstons, describes Wilkes as one of her mother's closest friends. She also noted that Wilkes was responsible for lettering and transcribing the scripts of the original Wonder Woman stories. Several years later, Jill Lepore also wrote about Wilkes in her 2014 book The Secret History of Wonder Woman.

Today, Wilkes is recognized as one of the female creators involved in the development of the character, alongside Elizabeth Holloway, Olive Byrne, Joye Hummel, Helen Schepens-Kraus, Margaret Wroten, and Louise Marston.
