= Ménage à trois =

Romantic relationship with three partners

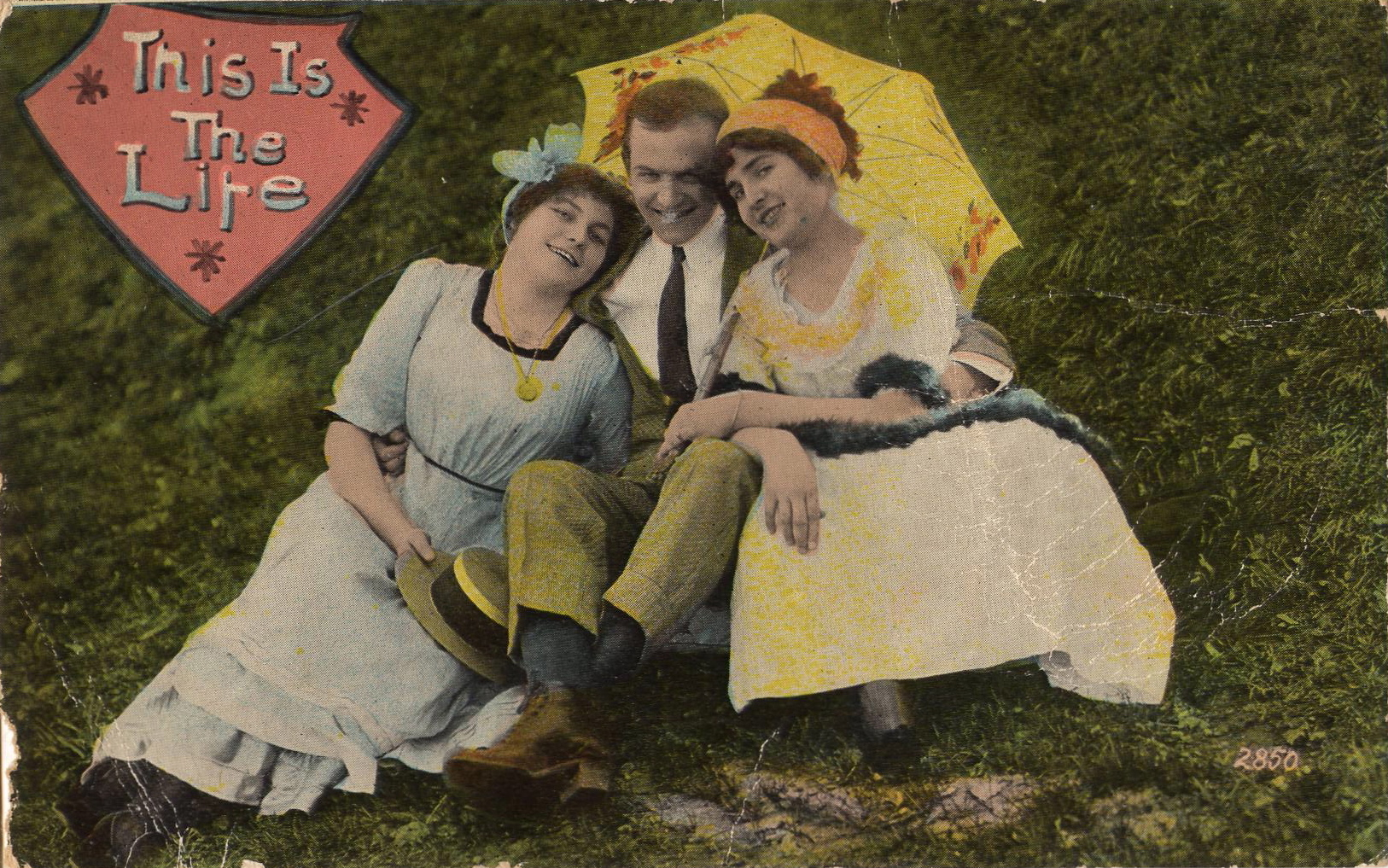
Postcard, c. 1910

A ménage à trois (French: [menaʒ a tʁwɑ]) is a domestic arrangement or committed relationship consisting of three people in polyamorous romantic or sexual relations with each other, and often dwelling together. The phrase is a loan from French meaning "household of three". Contemporary arrangements are sometimes identified as a throuple, thruple, or triad.

== Terminology ==
While this relationship type usually involves elements of bisexuality, occasionally at least one participant is homosexual. Because this term is sometimes interchangeably used for a threesome, which solely refers to a sexual experience involving three people, it can sometimes be misrepresented as some type of casual encounter. Although ménage à trois is a type of polyamorous relationships with three individuals, polyamory takes many different forms.

The topic sometimes overlaps seemingly opposing concepts such as Christian feminism and lesbian feminism. These ideas were explored by film maker Angela Robinson in her film Professor Marston and the Wonder Women through the love story of historical couple William Moulton Marston and Elizabeth Holloway Marston with their research assistant Olive Byrne.

Both the term and way of life are topics of discussion in areas associated with Christendom and Romance languages.

== Examples ==
=== Ancient history ===
Traditional ideas of the Abrahamic faiths and Christian views on marriage are prevalent in literature and media discussing this topic. Patriarchs Abraham and Sarah had an arrangement with Sarah's handmaiden Hagar. Interpretations of this vary, for example Judaism and Islam treat it much more like a polygamous situation, whereas Christian sources sometimes discuss the love triangle aspect of it, which are not directly analogous with a ménage à trois. Similarly when Jacob married Leah and Rachel, the polygamy and love triangle perspectives are well researched compared to the ménage à trois.

Sappho's writings influenced the early Christian church, and the topic of lesbianism within the ménage à trois framework of Christian couples began to be explored in post-Renaissance literature within Christian media.

=== Post-Renaissance history ===
Grand Duchess Anna Leopoldovna, regent of Russia from 1740 to 1741, was involved simultaneously in affairs with the Saxon ambassador Count Moritz zu Lynar and her lady-in-waiting Mengden. The regent's relationship with Mengden caused much disgust in Russia, and many believed her preoccupation with her relationships with Lynar and Mengden at the expense of governing made her a danger to the state. She was later overthrown in a coup.

In his youth, thirteen years her junior, the French philosopher Jean-Jacques Rousseau (1712–1778) was a protégé of the French noblewoman Françoise-Louise de Warens, who would become his first lover. He lived with her at her estate on and off since his teenage years, and in 1732, after he reached the age of 20, she initiated a sexual relationship with him while also being open about her sexual involvement with the steward of her house.

The German intellectual Dorothea von Rodde-Schlözer (1770–1825), her husband Mattheus Rodde and the French philosopher Charles de Villers also had a ménage à trois from 1794 until her husband's death in 1810.

The British Admiral Horatio Nelson (1758–1805) was in a ménage à trois with his lover Emma, Lady Hamilton, and her husband William Hamilton, the British ambassador to Naples, from 1799 until Nelson's death in 1805.

At the age of 16, in 1813, the future author of Frankenstein, Mary Godwin (1797–1851), eloped with her to-be husband Percy Bysshe Shelley and engaged in a ménage with Claire Clairmont, future lover of Lord Byron, with whom the Shelleys would later have an extensive relationship.

The Italian composer Luigi Ricci (1805–1859) married Ludmila Stolz, while still maintaining a relationship with her identical twin sister Francesca. He had a child with each.

The political philosopher Friedrich Engels (1820–1895) lived in a ménage à trois with his mistress Mary Burns and her sister Lizzie.

The Belgian artist/illustrator Félicien Rops (1833–1898) maintained a remarkable ménage à trois with two sisters, Aurélie and Léontine Dulac, who ran a successful fashion house in Paris, "Maison Dulac". They each bore a child with him (one died at an early age) and they lived together for over 25 years until his death.

The author E. Nesbit (1858–1924) lived with her husband Hubert Bland and his mistress Alice Hoatson, and raised their children as her own.

In 1913, psychoanalyst Carl Jung (1875–1961) began a relationship with a young patient, Toni Wolff, which lasted for some decades. Deirdre Bair, in her biography of Carl Jung, describes his wife Emma Jung as bearing up nobly as her husband insisted that Toni Wolff become part of their household, saying that Wolff was "his other wife".

The Russian and Soviet poet Vladimir Mayakovsky (1893–1930) lived with Lilya Brik, who was considered his muse, and her husband Osip Brik, an avant garde writer and critic.

The English poet, novelist and critic Robert Graves (1895–1985) and his wife Nancy Nicholson for some years attempted a triadic relationship called "The Trinity" with Laura Riding, a woman that Graves met and fell in love with in 1926. This triangle became the "Holy Circle" with the addition of Irish poet Geoffrey Phibbs, who himself was still married to Irish artist Norah McGuinness.

As recounted by the author and journalist Arthur Koestler (1905–1983) in The Invisible Writing, a conspicuous fixture of the intellectual life of 1930s Budapest was a threesome—a husband, his wife and the wife's lover—who were writers and literary critics and had the habit of every day spending many hours, the three of them together, at one of the Hungarian capital's well known cafes. As noted by Koestler, their relationship was so open and lasted so many years that it became no longer the subject of gossip.

The Italian surrealist artist Leonor Fini (1907–1996) sustained a ménage à trois until her death with Italian Count Stanislao Lepri and Polish writer Konstanty Jelenski in Paris. The relationship is believed to have impacted Fini's work, as she depicts gender neutral individuals or figures where traditional gender roles are reversed with a passive male and dominant female, such as Woman Seated on Naked Man (1942).

The writer Aldous Huxley (1894–1963) and his first wife Maria engaged in a ménage with Mary Hutchinson, a friend of Clive Bell. Huxley coined the term "omnifutuent", referring to bisexuality.

From 1939, the Nobel Prize winning German physicist Erwin Schrödinger (1887–1961), his wife, Annemarie Bertel, and his mistress, Hilde March, had a ménage à trois.

Charles Moulton, the creator of Wonder Woman, lived with two women, his wife Elizabeth Holloway Marston, and Olive Byrne, until he died. Charles had two children with each. Elizabeth supported the family financially while Olive stayed home to take care of all four children.

In 1963, the actress Hattie Jacques (1922–1980) lived with her husband John Le Mesurier and her lover John Schofield.

The French President François Mitterrand, his wife Danielle Mitterrand and her companion Jean Balenci, in a ménage à trois which constituted Mitterrand's 'official' family (for their close circle) until the start of his presidency in 1981.

Some 21st-century examples of notable triads include Seven Lions, who lives with his wife Emma and their girlfriend Courtney Simmons; Bella Thorne, who was publicly in a throuple with rapper Mod Sun and influencer Tana Mongeau from 2017 to 2019; Frankie Grande, a gay actor, describes living in a gay triad and RuPaul's Drag Race contestant Derrick Barry and his partners Nick San Pedro and Mackenzie Clauda, a fellow drag queen better known as Nebraska Thunderfuck.

=== Cultural influence ===
Folie à Deux winery has a popular set of wines labeled as Ménage à Trois.

In the Seinfeld TV series, season 6, episode 11, titled "The Switch," Jerry and George use this term as they devise a solution to address challenges in their relationships with women.

Wonder Woman is based on two women that were in a real life ménage à trois, as featured in Professor Marston and the Wonder Women, the creator of the comic, William Moulton Marston, and his legal wife, Elizabeth Holloway Marston, had a polyamorous life partner, Olive Byrne.

== See also ==
- Bigamy
- Committed relationship
- Gang bang
- Group sex
- Love triangle
- Open marriage
- Open relationship
- Polyamory
- Polyandry
- Polygamy
- Polygyny
- Swinging
- Troilism
- Unicorn hunting
