= Wonder Woman's bracelets =

Bracelets worn by Wonder Woman from DC Comics

- Wonder Woman deflects bullets in her live-action television series.

Publication information
- Publisher: DC Comics
- First appearance: All Star Comics #8 (October 1941)
- Created by: William Moulton Marston

In story information
- Type: Weapon
- Element of stories featuring: Wonder Woman

In the Wonder Woman comics, the Bracelets of Submission are a pair of fictional metal bracelets or cuffs worn by Wonder Woman and other Amazons. They were originally created by William Moulton Marston, alluding to the Amazons' ties to Greek mythology, as an allegory for his philosophy of loving submission. The bracelets protect Wonder Woman, allowing her to deflect impacts from many kinds of firearms and weapons. They are impervious to fire, energy blasts and projectiles (ranging from shells to arrows), while also making the heroine immune to fall damage.

== Symbolism of submission ==
"My strength is gone... it is Aphrodite's Law! When an Amazon permits a man to chain her Bracelets of Submission together, she becomes weak as other women in a man-ruled world!"

— Wonder Woman

William Moulton Marston depicted the origin story of the Amazons as Greek women who had been bound by the wrists by men, who at one point realized their power and broke free. They then moved to their own women-only island, where, in the absence of male oppression, they grew progressively stronger and lived a longer life. The "Bracelets of Submission" were still worn as a cautionary reminder: to forfeit one's independence by allowing male dominance over their will sapped them of their own power.

The inspiration to give Diana bracelets came from the pair of bracelets worn by Olive Byrne, creator William Moulton Marston's research assistant and lover. Marston quoted in a 1942 interview: "Wonder Woman and her sister Amazons have to wear heavy bracelets to remind them of what happens to a girl when she lets a man conquer her. The Amazons once surrendered to the charm of some handsome Greeks, and what a mess they got themselves into. The Greeks put them in chains of the Hitler type, beat them, and made them work like horses in the fields. Aphrodite, the goddess of love, finally freed these unhappy girls. But she laid down the rule [Aphrodite's Law] that they must never surrender to a man for any reason. I know of no better advice to give modern women than this rule that Aphrodite gave the Amazon girls".

Marston used bondage as a symbol concept as well as inducing submission acceptance. As a psychologist, Marston believed that "kinky doesn't make something wrong or weak, abuse does". Marston was heavily influenced by his relationships with his wife Elizabeth Holloway Marston and polyamorous life partner Olive Byrne; the latter was related to Margaret Sanger and Ethel Byrne, both radical feminists and pioneering supporters of birth control and abortion.

== Publication history ==
=== Pre-Crisis ===
In the Golden Age of Comics, the Amazons of Paradise Island are depicted wearing the bracelets as a symbol of submission to their patron goddess Aphrodite and, under the goddess's instruction, as a reminder to the Amazons of the folly of submitting to men and the resultant period when they were subjugated under the rule of the treacherous Hercules. The bracelets are magically made to be indestructible by Aphrodite, and are used as magically indestructible bracers which can deflect bullets, energy weapons, and any murderous weapons in Man's World.

The bracelets were originally said to be made of bronze, but in Wonder Woman #52, published in March 1952, it is first mentioned that the bracelets are composed of Amazonium, an indestructible fictional metal.

In Sensation Comics #4, it is revealed that Amazons temporarily lose their superhuman strength if a male welds chains to their bracelets together. Their strength remains unaffected if they are chained by females (Sensation Comics #10). They regain their strength if their bracelets are unchained. In later stories, Amazons lose their strength if males simply bind their wrists, rather than their bracelets, with chains or other forms of welding. In Comic Cavalcade #14, the bracelets are revealed to balance Amazon strength with loving submission to the positive aims of civilization.

The consequences of removing bracelets become simplified in later stories: if ever broken or removed, the Amazon would go into an uncontrollable destructive frenzy, as Dr. Marston's allegory for the unfettered destruction by the human ego. The bracelets are rarely broken, they can be broken only by magical weapons empowered by the gods themselves (such as Artemis's sword and Aegeus's dagger of Vulcan).

=== Post-Crisis ===
The Amazons are, as before, charged with wearing their bracelets as a constant reminder of their experience of enslavement. They also wear the bracelets as a penance of failing their mission to reform mankind. However, they do not lose their strength if males chain their bracelets together, and are not cursed with madness should the bracelets be removed or broken. Additionally, the generic Amazon bracelet provides no special protection.

When Diana wins the Contest to become Wonder Woman, she is given a pair of magical silver bracelets. The bracelets are later explained as having been forged from the remnants of the Aegis, a shield made from the indestructible hide of the great she-goat, Amalthea, who suckled Zeus as an infant. When crossed before her, the bracelets are able to generate a remnant of the Aegis, allowing Diana to deflect attacks far larger than the surface area of her bracelets. This remnant takes the form of a semi-visible spherical forcefield roughly twice the height of Diana.

Both Donna Troy and Cassie Sandsmark also have their own indestructible silver bracelets. When Hippolyta operates as Wonder Woman after Diana's resurrection, she likewise wears her own silver bracelets. When John Byrne took over the writing and art duties, he depicted the bracelets as larger than usual and bracer-like, with extension pieces being semi-distinct from the original bracelets.

It was revealed during Gail Simone's tenure as the title's writer that Zeus endowed the bracelets with the power to channel his divine lightning when they are struck together at will.

It was revealed in the New 52 that Wonder Woman's bracelets help her control her divine powers as a daughter of Zeus, as shown when she removes them during a fight with Artemis.

== In other media ==
On the live-action Wonder Woman television series, the two-part episode "The Feminum Mystique" establishes that the bracelets are produced from "feminum", a metal found only on Paradise Island. When Nazi agents learn the truth from Wonder Woman's sister Drusilla, they invade Paradise Island and force the Amazons to mine the feminum until the Amazons turn the tables on their captors. Removal of the bracelets leaves Wonder Woman vulnerable to attack but does not render her powerless or insane.

To create the bullet deflection effect, explosive charges were attached to the bracelets worn by Lynda Carter. She concealed triggering devices in her hands and, on cue, would trigger the devices to create the explosive effect.

The bracelets are depicted as bracers in the DC Extended Universe. The films feature Israeli actress Gal Gadot as Diana Prince / Wonder Woman, where the bracers allow Diana to produce a powerful concussive blast when brought together in a defensive position.
