= Holley Trent =

American romance fiction author

- Occupation: Romance fiction writer
- Writing career
- Pen name: H. E. Trent
- Genre: Romance
- Website: holleytrent.com/blog

Holley Trent is an American romance fiction author who writes with speculative fiction elements. Her books have queer characters and themes.

One of her novels has been described as "a polyamorous/triad romance about desert-dwelling telepathic descendants of Vikings." She is from North Carolina and writes work set there.

Her work was collected in Best Women's Erotica of the Year by Simon & Schuster in 2021.
