= Ethel Byrne =

American Progressive Era radical feminist

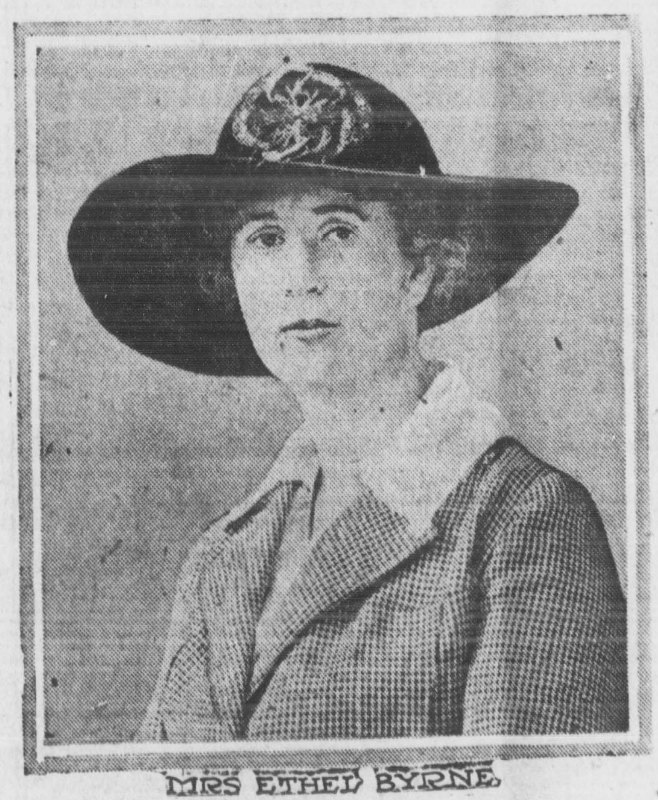
- Ethel in 1916
- Born: Ethel Higgins; 1883; Corning, New York, U.S.
- Died: 1955 (aged 71–72); Massachusetts, U.S.
- Occupations: Social reformer, nurse
- Spouse: Jack Byrne
- Children: 2, including Olive
- Relatives: Margaret Sanger (sister); Bob Higgins (brother)

Ethel Byrne (née Higgins; 1883–1955) was an American Progressive Era radical feminist. She was the sister of birth control activist Margaret Sanger, and assisted her in this work.

== Background ==
Ethel and Margaret were two out of eleven children of an Irish American family founded by Michael Hennessey Higgins and Anne Higgins. It has been noted that Anne Higgins gave preferential treatment to Ethel, much to the dismay of Margaret, and that caused a rift in their relationship.

Ethel had a short and unhappy marriage to Jack Byrne, a glassworker. They had two children, Jack and Olive. In 1906, Ethel left her children in the care of their paternal grandparents to protect them from their abusive father; Ethel only visited her daughter once in sixteen years. Olive grew up to become an important muse to the creator of Wonder Woman, William Moulton Marston, and more details of Ethel Byrne's life came to light when Jill Lepore wrote about the superheroine character in 2014.

Ethel Byrne's background in nursing was pivotal to her activism and directly contributed to her desire to make birth control accessible to women of varying socio-economic backgrounds. She was a trained nurse who assisted immigrant women in need of medical care in the Brownsville area of Brooklyn, New York in 1916.

== Birth control activism ==
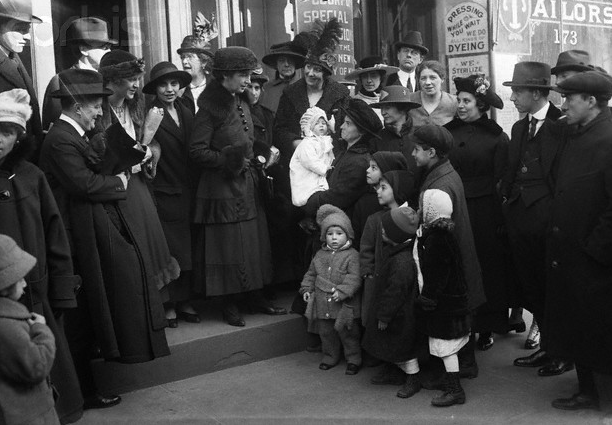
Margaret Sanger and her sister Ethel Byrne leaving a courthouse

The two sisters and theatre artist Fania Mindell opened a birth control clinic in Brooklyn in October 1916. The three feminist activists advertised the services offered by the clinic by passing out flyers in different languages, including English, Yiddish and Italian. Although Byrne is not widely known today, her early activism had long lasting impact on raising awareness of the importance of access to information about birth control. The arrest of Ethel Byrne compelled a group of politically active New York women to ask for a meeting with President Woodrow Wilson to request that he contribute to overturning laws criminalizing distribution of birth control.

== Arrest and hunger strike ==
The clinic was highly controversial due to the enforcement of the Comstock Laws. Byrne and Sanger distributed pessaries and would show their clients how to use this method of contraception in direct violation of these laws.

This was the first birth control clinic in the United States. The clinic caused an immediate sensation in the press, getting national attention, and all three women were arrested and tried for "distributing obscene materials".

"The police monitored the Clinic from its opening and sent in a female undercover agent to purchase contraceptive supplies. On October 26 (1916) an undercover police woman and vice-squad officers raided the clinic, confiscated an assortment of contraceptives from pessaries to condoms, along with 20 'books on young women', and arrested Sanger, Byrne and Mindell. After being arraigned, Sanger and Mindell spent the night in the Raymond Street jail, Byrne at the Liberty Avenue station. All were released the next morning on $500.00 bail."

All three women were found guilty, but eventually the verdicts were overturned, and their campaign was ultimately successful, leading to major changes in social policy and to the laws governing birth control and sex education around the world. The clinic closed but later became the basis for what was to become known as Planned Parenthood.

After being arrested for distribution of information about birth control, Byrne was sentenced to 30 days in Blackwell's Island prison. She was jailed at Blackwell Island workhouse on January 22, 1917, for her activism in advocating for the legalization of birth control and subsequently went on a hunger strike. Sanger was concerned her sister would lose her life as a result of this hunger strike and Byrne was force fed while serving her sentence after 185 hours without food or water. As historian Jill Lepore reports in The Secret History of Wonder Woman, Ethel Byrne was the first female political prisoner in the United States to be subjected to force feeding. Mrs. Byrne was prepared to starve herself to death in support of her cause. Her case was the first of a group of cases known as the "Sanger cases" to be brought to trial.

Sanger supported Byrne's activism and was quoted as saying "I didn't advise her to undertake this hunger strike, but I certainly would not tell her to end it now." Although they had a falling out after this arrest, their confinement helped bring national attention to their push for the legalization of birth control. It also hurt their relationship as Sanger's notoriety grew after this arrest and she was sometimes known to take credit for Ethel's infamous hunger strike.

== Later years ==
Although her sister went on to become world-famous for her advocacy of birth control, Byrne's legacy is not well known. This is apparent on the Planned Parenthood website, as it is noted Sanger opened her 1916 clinic with "her sister". Ethel is not even mentioned by name and unlike her older sister is not a household name.

Ethel Byrne had a stroke and died in 1955, aged 71–72. She did not live to see the legalization of the birth control pill, as she died five years before it received FDA approval.
