= Introducing Wonder Woman =

1941 comic book

- Cover of the first page of the story
- Publisher: All-American Publications (now DC Comics)
- Main character: Wonder Woman

Creative team
- Writer: William Moulton Marston
- Artist: H. G. Peter

"Introducing Wonder Woman" is a story from All Star Comics #8. Released on October 21, 1941 (cover dated Dec./Jan. 1941/1942), it is notable as the first appearance of Wonder Woman.

== Plot summary ==
U.S. Army Intelligence pilot Steve Trevor flies his fighter across the Atlantic Ocean in search of a Nazi spy. His plane runs out of fuel and he crash lands on Paradise Island. Two Amazons, Diana and Mala, recover him and bring him to their hospital, though they and the other Amazons show surprise at a man on Paradise Island. Diana spends several days nursing his wounds and slowly begins to fall in love with him. Her mother, Hippolyta, reminds the Amazon that men are forbidden to set foot on Paradise Island, much less remain there. She declares that as soon as Trevor is fit for travel, he is to be returned to the United States. She then, in two pages that were mostly text, tells Diana that in ancient Greece they were the foremost nation, but Hercules attacked them and was defeated due to Hippolyta's magic girdle, so Hercules resorted to trickery and stole the girdle. His men then enslaved and chained the Amazons. Hippolyta later appealed to Aphrodite and was freed and her girdle returned to her. The Amazons took the enemy fleet and travelled to a new island; however, they would always wear bracelets to remind them not to succumb to men. Hippolyta shows the magic sphere, which was given to her by Athena after they defeated the army of Hercules, and with which she can see the past, present, and even predict the future, which has made the Amazons an advanced race.

During Steve Trevor's convalescence, Hippolyta and Diana use the Magic Sphere to divine the nature of his arrival on the island. They look into the past and learn of Trevor's secret mission.

Two Nazi agents named von Storm and Fritz hijacked an experimental robot plane and attempted to bomb an army airfield. Trevor heroically took control of the plane and drove the Nazis away. He was in pursuit of Fritz's fighter across the ocean, when he crashed on the island.

After the goddesses of the Amazons, Aphrodite and Athena appear before her, Hippolyta decrees that an Amazon agent should be sent to the United States to aid the Americans in their fight against the Nazis. She holds a great tournament to determine which of her warriors should act as their good will ambassador. Diana wants to participate in the tournament, but Hippolyta forbids it.

Diana disguises herself with a simple mask and enters the tournament anyway. She masters every competition and becomes one of two finalists to compete in the "Bullets and Bracelets" competition. Diana defeats her opponent, Mala, because she deflects all five bullets while Mala is unable to deflect the fifth bullet and is wounded in the arm; Diana then reveals her true identity to the crowd. Hippolyta agrees to allow Diana to travel to the United States. She provides her with a patriotic costume and bestows upon her the name of Wonder Woman.

First appearances: Wonder Woman (a super-hero); Amazons (a race of warrior women); Aphrodite (Greek Goddess of Love); Athena (Greek Goddess of Wisdom); Fritz (a Nazi spy); Hercules (a Greek hero); Hippolyta (Queen of the Amazons); Mala (an Amazon); Phil Darnell (a Colonel in the United States Army); Steve Trevor (a Major in the United States Army); von Storm (a Nazi spy)

== Follow-up ==
The story would be continued in Sensation Comics #1.

== Millennium Edition ==
In 2000 and 2001, DC reprinted several of its most notable issues in the Millennium Edition series. All Star Comics #8 was reprinted in this format.
