= Sensation Comics =

American comic book

- The first issue of Sensation Comics marked the first cover appearance of Wonder Woman, art by H. G. Peter.

Publication information
- Publisher: DC Comics
- Schedule: Monthly: #1–93; Bimonthly: #94–109
- Format: Ongoing series
- Genre: Superhero (#1–93); Romance (#94–106); Supernatural/mystery (#107–109)
- Publication date: January 1942 – May–June 1952
- No. of issues: 109
- Main character: Wonder Woman

Sensation Comics is the title of an American comic book anthology series published by DC Comics that ran for 109 issues from 1942 to 1952. For most of its run, the lead feature was Wonder Woman, a character which had been introduced in All Star Comics #8 (October 1941). Other characters that appeared included the Black Pirate, the Gay Ghost, Mister Terrific, Wildcat, Sargon the Sorcerer, Hal Mason, the Whip, the Atom, Little Boy Blue, Hop Harrigan, Romance, Inc., Lady Danger, Doctor Pat, and Astra.

The series briefly became a romance title starting with issue #94 (November 1949). Johnny Peril became the lead feature with issue #107, when the theme of the comic changed to a supernatural/mystery format. The title was changed to Sensation Mystery with #110 and ran for another seven issues. The retitled series ended with issue #116 (July–August 1953).

== 1999 one-shot ==
The Sensation Comics title was used again in 1999 as the title for one issue of the Justice Society Returns storyline.

== 2014 revival ==
DC Comics revived the Sensation Comics series in August 2014 as a "Digital First" series featuring Wonder Woman. The print edition debuted with an October cover date. This series was cancelled in December 2015. The final issue was #17 (cover dated Feb. 2016).

== Collected editions ==
- Wonder Woman Archives
  - Volume 1 includes Sensation Comics #1–12, 240 pages, May 1998, ISBN 1-56389-402-5
  - Volume 2 includes Sensation Comics #13–17, 240 pages, February 2000, ISBN 978-1-56389-594-4
  - Volume 3 includes Sensation Comics #18–24, 240 pages, June 2002, ISBN 1-56389-814-4
  - Volume 4 includes Sensation Comics #25–32, 240 pages, March 2004, ISBN 1-4012-0145-8
  - Volume 5 includes Sensation Comics #33–40, 240 pages, September 2007, ISBN 1-4012-1270-0
  - Volume 6 includes Sensation Comics #41–48, 232 pages, July 2010, ISBN 978-1-4012-2734-0
  - Volume 7 includes Sensation Comics #49–57, 240 pages, November 2012, ISBN 978-1-4012-3743-1
- The Wonder Woman Chronicles
  - Volume 1 includes Sensation Comics #1–9, 192 pages, March 2010, ISBN 978-1-4012-2644-2
  - Volume 2 includes Sensation Comics #10–14, 192 pages, December 2011, ISBN 978-1-4012-3240-5
  - Volume 3 includes Sensation Comics #15–18, 176 pages, December 2012, ISBN 1-4012-3692-8
- JSA All-Stars Archives
  - Volume 1 includes Wildcat and Mister Terrific stories from Sensation Comics #1–5, 256 pages, October 2007, ISBN 978-1-4012-1472-2
- Sensation Comics Featuring Wonder Woman
  - Volume 1 includes Sensation Comics Featuring Wonder Woman #1–5, 168 pages, April 2015, ISBN 1-4012-5344-X
  - Volume 2 includes Sensation Comics Featuring Wonder Woman #6–10, 168 pages, October 2015, ISBN 1-4012-5862-X
  - Volume 3 includes Sensation Comics Featuring Wonder Woman #11–17, 232 pages, May 2016, ISBN 1-4012-6157-4
- Wonder Woman: The Golden Age Omnibus
  - Volume 1 includes Sensation Comics #1–24, 776 pages, October 2016, ISBN 978-1-4012-6496-3
  - Volume 2 includes Sensation Comics #25–48, 768 pages, July 2017, ISBN 978-1-4012-7146-6
  - Volume 3 includes Sensation Comics #49–69, 784 pages, November 2018, ISBN 978-1-4012-8082-6
  - Volume 4 includes Sensation Comics #70–89, 704 pages, March 2020, ISBN 978-1-4012-9479-3
  - Volume 5 includes Sensation Comics #90–104, 688 pages, November 2023, ISBN 978-1-77950-667-2
  - Volume 6 includes Sensation Comics #105–106, 704 pages, February 2025, ISBN 978-1-77952-597-0

=== Millennium Edition ===
In 2000 and 2001, DC reprinted several of its most notable issues in the Millennium Edition series. The first issue of Sensation Comics was reprinted in this format.
