= Professor Marston and the Wonder Women =

2017 film by Angela Robinson

- Theatrical release poster
- Directed by: Angela Robinson
- Written by: Angela Robinson
- Produced by: Terry Leonard; Amy Redford
- Starring: Luke Evans; Rebecca Hall; Bella Heathcote; JJ Feild; Oliver Platt; Connie Britton
- Cinematography: Bryce Fortner
- Edited by: Jeffrey M. Werner
- Music by: Tom Howe
- Production companies: BoxMedia; Stage 6 Films; Topple Productions
- Distributed by: Annapurna Pictures
- Release dates: September 9, 2017 (TIFF); October 13, 2017 (U.S.)
- Running time: 108 minutes
- Country: United States
- Language: English
- Box office: $1.9 million

Professor Marston and the Wonder Women is a 2017 American biographical drama film about American psychologist William Moulton Marston, who created the fictional character Wonder Woman. The film, directed and written by Angela Robinson, stars Luke Evans as Marston; Rebecca Hall as his legal wife Elizabeth; and Bella Heathcote as the Marstons' polyamorous life partner, Olive Byrne. JJ Feild, Oliver Platt, and Connie Britton also feature.

The film premiered at the 2017 Toronto International Film Festival and was released in the United States on October 13, 2017. It received positive reviews from critics, who praised the film's thoughtful portrayal and the cast performances while also receiving scrutiny from surviving family members for certain inaccuracies.

== Plot ==
The story is told in flashbacks set during William Moulton Marston's 1945 testimony to representatives of the Child Study Association of America. In 1928, William and his wife Elizabeth taught and researched at Harvard and Radcliffe colleges. William hires one of his students, Olive Byrne, as a research assistant. She aids in the Marstons' work, inventing the lie detector device and researching William's DISC theory. The three then soon grow close. One after another, tests with the lie detector reveal that they have fallen in love with one another, so they engage in a polyamorous relationship.

As word about their unconventional relationship gets out, the Marstons are fired from the university. Olive reveals that she is pregnant and moves in with them shortly after. The trio decides to build a family together and create a fabrication to keep the nature of their relationship a secret. The family settles in a New York suburb, happily together.

By 1934, Elizabeth and Olive each bear two children by William; they tell the neighbors that Olive is a widow who was taken in by the Marstons. He starts trying to make a living as an author. Elizabeth takes a job as a secretary and becomes the main breadwinner of the family. Olive stays at home and takes care of the kids, occasionally submitting her writing samples to publishers. They raise their four children together, and Elizabeth names her daughter after Olive.

In 1940, William stumbles upon a lingerie shop in New York City run by Charles Guyette, who introduces him to fetish art–themed comics and photos. The art captures his imagination as a demonstration of his DISC theory. Elizabeth initially disapproves of the art, but she relents during a presentation wherein Olive tries out an outfit that later would be the prototype for Wonder Woman's costume.

After finding limited work as a writer, Marston came up with the idea of creating a female Amazonian super-heroine for a comic book. The comic would feature his ideas on DISC theory, drawing inspiration from the Marstons' work on the lie detector as well as Elizabeth and Olive in real life. It would intend to support the feminist movement to further equal rights for women through a populist medium.

William pitches his ideas to Max Gaines, a publisher at National Periodical Publications. He ultimately accepts the comic and suggests simplifying the female superhero's name to "Wonder Woman". Wonder Woman is an instant hit, leading to prosperity for the family.

One day, a neighbor wanders into their home and witnesses the three of them having sex. This leads to their children getting bullied and asked to leave school by the staff. Worried about their children being ostracized and thinking they have no other choice, Elizabeth reluctantly demands that Olive leave the household with her children. At the same time, the Wonder Woman comic receives accusations of featuring overtly sexual, sadomasochistic, and lesbian imagery that leads to the testimony of the present day.

Leaving the testimony, William collapses and is rushed to the hospital. As he is dying of cancer, William asks Olive to meet him and Elizabeth again, hoping they reconcile. William persuades Elizabeth to submit to Olive, as she should not always dominate in their relationship. The Marstons get on their knees and beg for Olive's forgiveness, and Elizabeth tearfully admits that she cannot live without Olive. She eventually agrees to return to them.

The epilogue reveals that William died in 1947. Elizabeth and Olive continued to live together as a couple for another 43 years until Olive's death in 1990, and Elizabeth lived to be 100. It also notes that "sexual imagery disappeared from the Wonder Woman comic after William's death, along with her superpowers. In 1972, Gloria Steinem reclaimed Wonder Woman by putting her on the cover of the first issue of Ms. Magazine. Wonder Woman's superpowers were eventually restored."

== Cast ==
- Luke Evans as William Moulton Marston
- Rebecca Hall as Elizabeth Holloway Marston
- Bella Heathcote as Olive Byrne
- Monica Giordano as Mary
- JJ Feild as Charles Guyette
- Chris Conroy as Brant Gregory
- Oliver Platt as Max Gaines
- Christopher Paul Richards as Teen Donn
- Connie Britton as Josette Frank

== Production ==
Principal photography on the film began in early October 2016. Sony Pictures Worldwide Acquisitions acquired worldwide rights, while Topple Productions and BoxMedia, formerly Boxspring Entertainment, produced the film. Amy Redford also produced, along with Terry Leonard.

== Release ==
The film was released on October 13, 2017, by Annapurna Pictures. It had its world premiere at the 2017 Toronto International Film Festival in September.

=== Critical response ===
Critics commended Robinson for crafting a thoughtful portrayal of the intricate personal life of Marston. On review aggregator website Rotten Tomatoes, the film has an approval rating of 87% based on 181 reviews, and an average rating of 7.3/10. The site's critical consensus reads, "Professor Marston & The Wonder Women winds a lasso of cinematic truth around a fascinating fact-based tale with strong performances from its three stars." On Metacritic, the film has a weighted average score of 68 out of 100, based on reviews from 38 critics, indicating "generally favorable reviews".

In a positive review, David Sims of The Atlantic wrote, "It's genuinely daring how Robinson depicts the evolution of the [trio's] love, from Olive's girlish fascination with William to her deeper infatuation with Elizabeth; this is a film that doesn't fetishize their fluid sexuality and make it a sideshow to be gawked at.” Critic Christy Lemire said the film is "a timely affirmation of feminine power—of how female wisdom and strength can charge hearts and minds, influence culture and inspire others to be their most authentic selves." Justin Chang of the Los Angeles Times praised the chemistry between the three leads, citing Hall in particular "as Elizabeth moves from furious self-possession toward a humble assertion of a need she didn't know existed."

=== Reaction of family members ===
William and Elizabeth Marston's granddaughter, Christie Marston, criticized the film, saying the idea that Elizabeth and Olive were lovers was purely fictional. While clarifying that she was not offended by the notion and technically could not "swear" they had no such relationship, she explained that she had been a close, personal confidant of her grandmother's, and she could "say with 99.99% certainty that they did not." While her grandmother's views on sexuality were very progressive, her relationship with Olive had always unambiguously been one of close friendship and mutual dependence. She also noted that despite the film being promoted as a "true story", the family was never consulted for the film, nor did the director attempt to contact them.

Yereth Rosen, granddaughter of Josette Frank, criticized the extremely conservative portrayal of her grandmother in the film, saying, "Real Josette was pretty much the opposite of a Focus on the Family-type arch-conservative Christian, for reasons beyond the fact that she was not a Christian."

=== Accolades ===
The film was nominated for a Saturn Award in the category Best Independent Film.

== See also ==
- Counterstereotype
- Bisexual women
- Portrayal of women in American comics
