= Olive Byrne =

American author, inspiration for Wonder Woman

- Born: Mary Olive Byrne; February 19, 1904; Steuben County, New York, U.S.
- Died: May 19, 1990 (aged 86); Tampa, Florida, U.S.
- Other names: Olive Richard (pen name); Dotsie
- Occupation: Writer
- Known for: Involvement in the creation of Wonder Woman
- Partner(s): William Moulton Marston; Elizabeth Holloway Marston
- Children: 2
- Parent(s): Ethel Byrne (mother); Jack Byrne (father)
- Relatives: Margaret Sanger (aunt); Bob Higgins (uncle)

Mary Olive Byrne (/bɜːrn/), known professionally as Olive Richard (February 19, 1904 – May 19, 1990), was the live-in polyamorous life partner of William Moulton Marston and Elizabeth Holloway Marston. She and Elizabeth have been credited as inspirations for the comic book character Wonder Woman.

Byrne was the daughter of Ethel Byrne, the Progressive Era activist who opened the first birth-control clinic in the United States with her sister Margaret Sanger.

== Early life ==
Byrne was delivered into an Irish American family by her aunt Margaret Sanger to the Byrne family in Corning, New York, 1904. Two years later her mother Ethel Byrne left a two-year-old Byrne and her three-year-old brother Jack at their paternal grandparents' home to protect them from their abusive father. Ethel visited once, when Byrne was six. She was then raised by her grandparents until they died in 1914, when she was sent off to a Catholic orphanage. In 1917, during Ethel Byrne's famous hunger strike, Margaret Sanger came to the orphanage and met Byrne for the first time in the young girl's memory to tell her of her mother and her work. Byrne met her mother for the first time in ten years when she was 16, after which she began occasionally living with Ethel and her lover Rob Parker. While staying with them she was exposed to much of Sanger's work such as Woman and the New Race, The Pivot of Civilization, and the ideas of "voluntary motherhood" and sexual freedom.

Byrne entered her freshman year at Tufts University studying medicine at her mother's bidding. By the end of the school year she had been initiated into the Alpha Omicron Pi sorority. She had a distinctively androgynous appearance with a short Eton crop and was known around campus for her connection to Sanger. She worked at Sanger's Clinical Research Bureau over Christmas vacation.

== Relationship ==
Byrne met William and Elizabeth Marston in 1925 while she was a senior attending Tufts University. William was her psychology professor, and she soon became his research assistant, even taking him to her sorority to do some of his research. She was instrumental in introducing him to the world of sorority baby parties (in which freshman girls are required to dress like babies and are treated like children), at which he performed some of his experiments on human reactions to power. Following her graduation she moved in with the Marstons and planned to begin a doctoral program in psychology. Ultimately she dropped out of her program to care for the first of Sarah Elizabeth (née Holloway) Marston's children, Moulton "Pete" Marston. That same year William published Emotions of Normal People, a defense of many behaviors considered sexual taboos at the time, using much of Byrne's original research she had done for her doctorate, and dedicated the work to five women, Byrne included. It received almost no attention from the rest of the academic community other than a review, written by Byrne herself, under her alternate name Olive Richard in The Journal of Abnormal and Social Psychology.

That November, she "married" both William and Elizabeth, wearing wide-band bracelets on each arm instead of a ring, and from then on referred to November 21 as "anniversary". In 1931, she had her first son, Byrne, and the next year she had her second and final, Donn. In 1935, both boys were officially adopted by the Marstons. She began working as a staff writer for Family Circle that same year writing under her Richard name. Her first article was about Marston, his polygraph and her experience meeting him and his children—without mentioning her relation to him or that two of the children were hers. She helped type many of Marston's Wonder Woman scripts.

Byrne lived with William and Elizabeth Marston for a number of years, but kept the details of their intimate relationship a secret. They told census takers that Byrne was Elizabeth's widowed sister-in-law. They told Marston's mother that Byrne was their widowed house keeper. Byrne's mother and brother, Ethel and Jack Byrne, never approved of Marston.

Byrne and Elizabeth each had children with Marston while the three were together, and each named one of her children after the other woman. Elizabeth named her daughter Olive, and Byrne (then using her alias Olive Richard) named her first son Byrne Holloway Richard. For her sons, Byrne invented a husband named William K. Richard who had died shortly after Donn was born. The boys were told of their true parentage in 1963.

Olive Byrne largely raised the children and Elizabeth held the most stable career until William established himself with Wonder Woman. The two women continued living together while raising both of their children after William's death.

Byrne died in 1990 in Tampa, Florida at the age of 86.

== Wonder Woman ==
Both Byrne and Elizabeth "embodied the feminism of the day". As reported by Jill Lepore in the 2014 book The Secret History of Wonder Woman, Byrne has been credited by some as being Marston's inspiration for the physical appearance of his iconic character, Wonder Woman. Marston himself only remarked that a pair of bracelets that Byrne frequently wore inspired the ones that became an important feature of the comic book heroine.

== In film ==
Byrne's life is depicted in Professor Marston and the Wonder Women, a 2017 biographical drama which tells the director's fictionalised view of her life and that of her family, especially of the relationship she had with her intimate life partners William Moulton Marston and his wife Elizabeth Holloway Marston. The film also relates the influence she had on the creation of the iconic Amazonian heroine Wonder Woman. Byrne is portrayed in the film by Australian actress Bella Heathcote.

== Asteroid ==
Asteroid 102234 Olivebyrne was named in her memory. The official naming citation was published by the Minor Planet Center on 25 September 2018 (M.P.C. 111800) along with the naming of asteroid 101813 Elizabethmarston.
