= Wonder Woman =

DC Comics superheroine

- Various incarnations of Wonder Woman, as depicted in Wonder Woman #750 (2020). Art by Nicola Scott.

Publication information
- Publisher: DC Comics
- First appearance: All Star Comics #8 (October 1941) (Note: All Star Comics #8 was cover-dated December–January 1941–1942, but published October 21, 1941.)
- Created by: William Moulton Marston; H. G. Peter (uncredited)

In-story information
- Full name: Diana of Themyscira
- Species: Amazon, Olympian God, Olympian-Amazonian Demigoddess (since 2011)
- Place of origin: Themyscira
- Team affiliations: Justice League; Justice Society of America; Star Sapphires; Justice League Dark; Lords of Chaos; Department of Metahuman Affairs
- Partnerships: Wonder Girl (various); Steve Trevor; Artemis of Bana-Mighdall; Zatanna; Superman; Batman; Manhunter
- Notable aliases: Diana Prince; Wonder Woman; Amazing Amazon; Princess of Paradise; Champion of the Amazons; Spirit of Truth; Warrior of Peace
- Abilities: See list: Superhuman strength, speed, stamina, durability, senses, agility, and reflexes; The ability to summon and control lightning; Flight; Magic; Bulletproof; Reality control; Telepathy; Creating weapons via her bracelets; Control over all armies as the God of War; Divine wisdom; Super breath; Mind control; Teleportation; Communication with animals; Omnilingual; Cosmic awareness; Power of healing factor; Immortality; Master martial artist and hand-to-hand combatant; Weapon mastery; Uses Lasso of Truth, indestructible bracelets to deflect opposing weapons, projectile tiara, sword, shield, and invisible plane

Wonder Woman is a superheroine appearing in American comic books published by DC Comics. The character first appeared in All Star Comics #8, published October 21, 1941, with her first feature in Sensation Comics #1 in January 1942. She was created by the American psychologist and writer William Moulton Marston (pen name: Charles Moulton), and artist Harry G. Peter in 1941. Marston's wife, Elizabeth, and their life partner, Olive Byrne, are credited as being his inspiration for the character's appearance. She is the biological daughter of Zeus and Hippolyta. She is one of the first DC superheroes and is one of the most influential superheroes of all time. The Wonder Woman title has been published by DC Comics almost continuously ever since.

An Amazon-Olympian princess and warrior, Wonder Woman is known in her homeland, the island nation of Themyscira, by her official title Princess Diana of Themyscira. When blending into the society outside her homeland, she sometimes adopts her civilian identity, Diana Prince. Wonder Woman's original/first origin story dates from the Golden Age of Comic Books, which relays that she was sculpted from clay by her mother, Queen Hippolyta, and given a life as an Amazon and Olympian by birth, along with superpowers as gifts from the Greek goddesses.

Following DC's continuity re-setting storyline Flashpoint in 2011, Wonder Woman was among multiple characters who had their origins significantly altered, as New 52 reboot she was re-written as the biological daughter of the Greek god Zeus. This current canon origin of Diana was used in adaptations of the DC Extended Universe (2013–2023) and the DC Animated Movie Universe (2013–2020), two continuities that took major inspiration from the New 52 era (the DCAMU especially was developed to be an animated companion to the New 52 era).

However, her original clay origin was re-established as her origin in DC's mainline continuity in Wonder Woman (2023) Issue #2 after DC had begun re-inserting elements of pre-Flashpoint DC canon into the post-Flashpoint DC universe.

Popular adaptations like the DC Animated Universe have established their own takes on Diana's origin, with their iteration of Diana potentially being the daughter of Hades, who claimed to have helped Hippolyta, a past lover of his in this continuity, mold her from clay. This included briefly losing her powers entirely in the late 1960s, and being reinvented in the 1980s by artist George Pérez with an athletic look which emphasized her Amazonian heritage. She possesses an arsenal of magical items, including the Lasso of Truth, a pair of indestructible bracelets, a tiara which serves as a projectile, and, in older stories, a range of devices based on Amazon technology.

Wonder Woman's character was created during World War II; the character in the story was initially depicted fighting Axis forces as well as an assortment of colorful supervillains, although over time her stories came to place greater emphasis on characters, deities, and monsters from Greek mythology. Many stories depicted Wonder Woman freeing herself from bondage, which counterpointed the "damsels in distress" trope that was common in comics during the 1940s. In the decades since her debut, Wonder Woman has gained a cast of enemies bent on destroying her, including her archenemy Cheetah and classic villains such as Ares, Circe, Doctor Poison, Giganta, Doctor Psycho, and Doctor Cyber, along with more recent adversaries such as Veronica Cale, the Silver Swan, Genocide and Grail. Wonder Woman has also regularly appeared in comic books featuring the superhero teams Justice Society of America (1941) and Justice League (1960).

The character is an archetypical figure in popular culture recognized worldwide, partly due to being widely adapted into television, film, animation, apparel, merchandise, video games, and toys, with Wonder Woman Day celebrated on October 21 of each year (the anniversary of her first appearance). Shannon Farnon, Susan Eisenberg, Maggie Q, Lucy Lawless, Keri Russell, Rosario Dawson, Cobie Smulders, Rachel Kimsey, and Stana Katic, among others, have provided the character's voice for animated adaptations. Wonder Woman has been depicted in film and television by Linda Harrison, Cathy Lee Crosby, Lynda Carter, Megan Gale, Adrianne Palicki, and Gal Gadot.

== Publication history ==
=== Creation ===
Original illustration of Wonder Woman by H. G. Peter, circa 1941.

In an October 1940 interview with the Family Circle magazine, William Moulton Marston discussed the unfulfilled potential of the comic book medium. This article caught the attention of comics publisher Max Gaines, who hired Marston as an educational consultant for National Periodicals and All-American Publications, two of the companies that would merge to form DC Comics. At that time, Marston wanted to create his own new superhero; Marston's wife and fellow psychologist Elizabeth suggested to him that it should be a woman:

William Moulton Marston, a psychologist already famous for inventing the polygraph, struck upon an idea for a new kind of superhero, one who would triumph not with fists or firepower, but with love. "Fine," said Elizabeth. "But make her a woman."

Marston introduced the idea to Gaines. Given the go-ahead, Marston developed Wonder Woman, whom he believed to be a model of that era's unconventional, liberated woman. Marston also drew inspiration from the bracelets worn by Olive Byrne, who lived with the couple in a polyamorous relationship. Wonder Woman debuted in All Star Comics #8 (cover date Dec/Jan 1941/1942, released in October 1941). While Marston wrote the story, H. G. Peter did the artwork, and Marjorie Wilkes was responsible for inking, lettering, and transcribing the scripts. Marston was the creator of a systolic-blood-pressure-measuring apparatus, which was crucial to the development of the polygraph (lie detector). Marston's experience with polygraphs convinced him that women were more honest than men in certain situations and could work more efficiently.

Marston designed Wonder Woman to be an allegory for the ideal love leader; the kind of woman who he believed should run society. "Frankly, Wonder Woman is psychological propaganda for the new type of woman who, I believe, should rule the world", Marston wrote.

In a 1943 issue of The American Scholar, Marston wrote:

Not even girls want to be girls so long as our feminine archetype lacks force, strength, and power. Not wanting to be girls, they don't want to be tender, submissive, peace-loving as good women are. Women's strong qualities have become despised because of their weakness. The obvious remedy is to create a feminine character with all the strength of Superman plus all the allure of a good and beautiful woman.

— William Moulton Marston

Marston was an outspoken feminist, polyamorist, and firm believer in the superiority of women. He described bondage and submission as a "respectable and noble practice". Marston wrote in a weakness for Wonder Woman, which was attached to a fictional stipulation that he dubbed "Aphrodite's Law", that made the chaining of her "Bracelets of Submission" together by a man take away her Amazonian super strength.

The only hope for peace is to teach people who are full of pep and unbound force to enjoy being bound... only when the control of self by others is more pleasant than the unbound assertion of self in human relationships can we hope for a stable, peaceful human society.

— William Moulton Marston

=== Golden Age ===
Initially, Wonder Woman was an Amazon champion who wins the right to return Steve Trevor – a United States intelligence officer whose plane had crashed on the Amazons' isolated island homeland – to "Man's World" and to fight crime and the evil of the Nazis.

In her first appearance in All-Star Comics Vol. 1 #8 (January 1942), one of the most iconic moment, Diana enters the Amazon tournament in disguise, wearing the identity of "Contestant Number 7." The final trial is to deflect bullets with her bracelets—an ultimate test of Amazonian skill. Diana succeeds flawlessly. When Queen Hippolyta meets the winner, Diana removes her mask, revealing her true identity. Hippolyta realizes it was her daughter all along, and acknowledges that Diana truly deserves the title of Amazon Champion.

During this period, Wonder Woman joined the Justice Society of America as the team's secretary.

=== Silver Age ===
During the Silver Age of the 1960s, under writer Robert Kanigher, Wonder Woman's origin was revamped, along with other characters'. The new origin story increased the character's Hellenic and mythological roots: receiving the blessing of each deity in her crib, Diana is destined to become as "beautiful as Aphrodite, wise as Athena, strong as Hercules, and swift as Hermes."

At the end of the 1960s, under the guidance of Mike Sekowsky, Wonder Woman surrendered her powers to remain in Man's World rather than accompany her fellow Amazons to another dimension. Wonder Woman was always Diana Prince and opens a mod boutique. She acquires a Chinese mentor named I Ching, who teaches Diana martial arts and weapons skills. Using her fighting skill instead of her powers, Diana engaged in adventures that encompassed a variety of genres, from espionage to mythology. This phase of her story was directly influenced by the British spy thriller The Avengers and Diana Rigg's portrayal of Emma Peel.

=== Bronze Age ===
In the early 1970s the character returned to her superhero roots in the Justice League of America and to the World War II era in her own title. This, however, was ultimately due to the popularity of the TV series at the time also having Wonder Woman set in the WWII era, and was shifted back to the 1970s era once the TV show did the same.

With a new decade arriving, DC president Jenette Kahn ordered a revamp in Wonder Woman's appearance. Artist Milton Glaser, who also designed the "bullet" logo adopted by DC in 1977, created a stylized "WW" emblem that evoked and replaced the eagle in her bodice and debuted in 1982. The emblem in turn was incorporated by studio letterer Todd Klein onto the monthly title's logo, which lasted for a year and a half before being replaced by a version from Glaser's studio. The series was canceled with issue #329 (February 1986) written by Gerry Conway, depicting Steve Trevor's marriage to Wonder Woman.

=== Modern Age ===
Following the 1985 Crisis on Infinite Earths series, George Pérez, Len Wein, and Greg Potter rewrote the character's origin story, depicting Wonder Woman as an emissary and ambassador from Themyscira to Patriarch's World, charged with the mission of bringing peace to the outside world. Pérez incorporated a variety of deities and concepts from Greek mythology in Wonder Woman's stories and origin. His rendition of the character acted as the foundation for the modern Wonder Woman stories, as he expanded upon the widely accepted origin of Diana being birthed out of clay. The relaunch was a critical and commercial success.

=== 21st century ===
==== 2010s ====
Wonder Woman with Batman and Superman on the cover of Wonder Woman (vol. 5) Annual #1 (July 2017). Art by Nicola Scott and Romulo Fajardo Jr. In the 21st century, the three have appeared together in multiple titles as part of DC's trinity of its most popular and important superheroes.

In August 2010 (issue #600), J. Michael Straczynski took over the series' writing duties and introduced Wonder Woman to an alternate timeline created by the Gods in which Paradise Island had been destroyed and the Amazons scattered around the world. In this timeline, Diana is an orphan raised in New York. The entire world has forgotten Wonder Woman's existence and the main story of this run was of Diana trying to restore reality even though she does not properly remember it herself. A trio of Death Goddesses called The Morrigan acted as the main enemy of Wonder Woman. In this run, Wonder Woman wears a new costume designed by Jim Lee. Straczynski determined the plot and continued writing duties until Wonder Woman #605; writer Phil Hester then continued his run, which ultimately concluded in Wonder Woman #614.

Following the events of the Flashpoint storyline in 2011, DC rebooted their primary comics continuity and in The New 52 continuity, Wonder Woman was one of the many major books to be relaunched for the start of the new continuity, with Brian Azzarello as the author and Cliff Chiang as the artist. In this new continuity, Wonder Woman's costume was changed to one inspired by her original Marston costume (except with a red-black-silver color scheme rather than the classic red-blue-gold).

In accordance with the DC-wide reboot, Azzarello and Chiang's run revamped much of the Wonder Woman lore, including changing her origin to that of a demi-goddess who is the natural-born daughter of Hippolyta and Zeus.

In 2016, DC Comics entered the DC Rebirth era. Due to the controversial nature of some of the changes made to the DC Universe in the New 52 era, the Rebirth era, specifically the story Doomsday Clock, saw a partial revamp of DC's main continuity wherein certain aspects of pre-New 52 continuity were restored to the current timeline while also continuing some aspects and storylines of the New 52 era. In Rebirth, Wonder Woman relaunched to its fifth volume was released semi-monthly with writer Greg Rucka. This fifth volume of Wonder Woman is part of the "DC Universe", the current continuity established after Rebirth. Initially, the new series does not use a regular storyline that exists between each issue; instead two separate storylines share the book, with an installment of one story published every other issue, and those of the other storyline published in between those. This practice began with the storyline "The Lies", for the odd numbered issues, and "Year One", for the even numbered issues. The new storyline as presented in these issues effectively retcons the events from the previous New 52 series. "The Lies" storyline reveals that numerous events from the previous Wonder Woman series, in which Diana was made the Queen of the Amazons and the God of War, were in fact all an illusion created by a mysterious villain, and she had never once been back to Themyscira ever since she left, nor is she capable of returning there. The "Year One" story is presented as an all-new origin story for Diana, which reveals how she received her powers from the Olympian Gods, which was intended to bring her back to her classical DC roots. Wonder Woman appears in DC Rebirth with a revised look with an ancient Greek motif, including a red cape and light armor fittings, such as pteruges and shin guards. Along with her lasso and bracelets, she now regularly uses her sword and shield. Wonder Woman: Rebirth artist Liam Sharp described the new armor as a utilitarian piece which allows her to move more freely. Rucka used this storyline to remove the controversial changes that Azzarello and Chiang's run has made to long-standing Wonder Woman lore, including a storyline which depicted the Amazons as rapists that raided ships and had children with male sailors, with any male children they had being abandoned. However, elements like Diana's New 52 origin as Zeus's daughter were not altered, as other storylines still referenced this version of Diana's origin, like Justice League: The Darkseid War by Geoff Johns..

In 2018, DC Comics announced G. Willow Wilson as the new writer on the Wonder Woman ongoing series. Wilson began her run in November, with the first story arc titled "The Just War."

==== 2020s ====
Wonder Woman as depicted in the promotional character art of Trial of the Amazons. Art by Joëlle Jones.

Steve Orlando took over from Wilson in 2020 with Mariko Tamaki taking over from him later in the year. 2020 also saw the Wonder Woman comics issues' numbering order restructured as DC's Doomsday Clock event united the current series to the original Golden Age as one continuous run. This meant the next issue was #750 despite the previous issue being numbered only #83. To celebrate, the issue was extra length and collected a variety of short stories celebrating the character of Wonder Woman with previous writers such as Phil Jimenez, Gail Simone and Greg Rucka returning. In early 2021, it was announced that Becky Cloonan and Michael Conrad would serve as the writers of Wonder Woman starting with issue 770 as a part of Infinite Frontier, with Travis Moore serving as the initial artist. Their run would last up to issue 800 in June 2023, where it was then announced that the series would receive a new #1 as a part of the Dawn of DC relaunch. During their run, Hippolyta ascended to Olympus and became an Olympian goddess. Tom King will serve as the writer and Daniel Sampere providing the art, with the first issue launching on September 6, 2023, and a short story in issue 800 that will set up the series by introducing Diana's future daughter Elizabeth Prince/ Trinity.

In late 2024, King's run coincides with the events of the company-wide crossover event Absolute Power as she and other heroes face off against Amanda Waller after their powers are stolen from them by Waller. Diana works with Damian Wayne/Robin and Steve Trevor to free multiple imprisoned metahumans from a secret prison created by Waller

King's run also used Diana's clay origin instead of the newer one used in the New 52, notably referencing Diana's clay origin where Diana molds her daughter Elizabeth from clay, combines her and Steve Trevor's essences, and calls upon her mother to bring the child to life, noting it as parallel to Diana's own birth. Mark Waid's New History of the DC Universe (2025) and later also referenced Diana's original clay origin.

Despite King's usage of the clay origin, according to DC Comics in their reference books released in collaboration with Dorling Kindersley, including the latest 5th edition, have cited Diana as being the daughter of Zeus as the current canon origin of the character.

=== Others ===
Diana, after her death, was granted divinity as the Goddess of Truth by her gods for such faithful devotion. During her brief time as a god of Olympus, Diana was replaced in the role of Wonder Woman by her mother, Queen Hippolyta. Unlike Diana receiving the title of Wonder Woman in honor, Hippolyta's role as Wonder Woman was meant to be a punishment for her betrayal in Artemis' death as well as for unintentionally killing her own daughter.

John Byrne, the writer that introduced the concept of Hippolyta as the first Wonder Woman, has explained his intentions in a post in his message board:

I thought George's one "mistake" in rebooting Wonder Woman was making her only 25 years old when she left Paradise Island. I preferred the idea of a Diana who was thousands of years old (as, if I recall correctly, she was in the TV series). From that angle, I would have liked to have seen Diana having been Wonder Woman in WW2, and be returning to our world in the reboot. Not having that option, I took the next best course, and had Hippolyta fill that role.

As Wonder Woman, Queen Hippolyta immediately got involved in a time travel mission back to the 1940s with Jay Garrick. After this mission, she elected to join the Justice Society of America and remained in that era for eight years, where her teammates nicknamed her "Polly". During that time she had a relationship with Ted Grant. Hippolyta also made visits into the past to see her godchild Lyta, daughter of Hippolyta's protege Helena, the Golden Age Fury. These visits happened yearly from young Lyta's perspective and also accounted for Hippolyta's participation in the JSA/JLA team ups. When she returned from the past, Hippolyta took Diana's place in the JLA as well.

Following Wonder Woman's ascension to heaven and return to the living in Infinite Frontier, she officially gives her blessing for her mother Hippolyta and her Amazon sister Nubia to share the title of Wonder Woman, meaning there are now three Wonder Women in current continuity.

== Fictional character biography ==
=== 20th century ===
==== Origin ====
In her debut in All Star Comics #8, Diana was a member of a tribe of women called the Amazons, native to Paradise Island – a secluded island set in the middle of a vast ocean. Captain Steve Trevor's plane crashes on the island and he is found alive but unconscious by Diana and fellow Amazon, and friend, Mala. Diana has him nursed back to health and falls in love with him. A competition is held among all the Amazons by Diana's mother, the Queen of the Amazons Hippolyta, to determine who is the most worthy of all the women; Hippolyta charges the winner with the responsibility of delivering Captain Steve Trevor back to Man's World and to fight for justice. Hippolyta forbids Diana from entering the competition, but she takes part nonetheless, wearing a mask to conceal her identity. She wins the competition and reveals herself, surprising Hippolyta, who ultimately accepts, and must give in to, Diana's wish to go to Man's World. She then is awarded a special uniform made by her mother for her new role as Wonder Woman and safely returns Steve Trevor to his home country.

==== Golden Age ====
Coming to America for the first time, Wonder Woman comes upon a wailing army nurse who happens to look identical to her. Inquiring about her state, she finds that the nurse wanted to leave for South America with her fiancé but was unable due to shortage of money. As Wonder Woman needed a job and a valid identity to look after Steve (who was admitted in the same army hospital), she gives her the money she had earned earlier to help her go to her fiancé in exchange for her credentials. The nurse reveals her name as Diana Prince, and thus, Wonder Woman's secret identity was created, and she began working as a nurse in the army.

Wonder Woman then took part in a variety of adventures, mostly side by side with Trevor. Her most common foes during this period would be Nazi forces led by a German baroness named Paula von Gunther, occasionally evil deities/demigods such as Mars and the Duke of Deception, and then colorful villains like Hypnota, Doctor Psycho, and Cheetah.

==== Silver Age ====
In the Silver Age, Wonder Woman's history received several changes. Her earlier origin, which had significant ties to World War II, was changed and her powers were shown to be the product of the gods' blessings, corresponding to her epithet, "beautiful as Aphrodite, wise as Athena, stronger than Hercules, and swifter than Hermes". The concepts of Wonder Girl and Wonder Tot were also introduced during this period.

Wonder Woman #179 (November 1969) showed Wonder Woman giving up her powers and returning her costume and title to her mother, to continue staying in Man's World. The reason behind this was that all the Amazons were shifting to another dimension, but Diana was unable to accompany them as she needed to stay behind to help Steve, who had been wrongly convicted. Thus, she no longer held the title of Wonder Woman and after meeting and training under a blind martial arts mentor I-Ching, Diana resumed crime fighting as the powerless Diana Prince. She ran a mod-boutique as a business and dressed in a series of jumpsuits while fighting crime.

==== Bronze Age ====
In Wonder Woman #204, Diana's magical powers and costume were returned to her and she is once again reinstated as Wonder Woman. I-Ching is killed by a crazy sniper in the same issue. Later, Diana meets her sister Nubia, who is Hippolyta's daughter fashioned out of dark clay (hence Nubia's dark complexion). Nubia claimed to be the "Wonder Woman of The Floating Island", and she challenges Diana to a duel which ends in a draw. Returning to her home, Nubia would have further adventures involving Diana.

The last issue of Volume 1 showed Diana and Steve Trevor announce their love for each other and their subsequent marriage.

==== Modern Age ====
Cover of Wonder Woman (vol. 2)#1 (February 1987), showing the character's look after the Crisis on Infinite Earths continuity reboot. Art by George Pérez.

==== Crisis on Infinite Earths ====
The events of Crisis on Infinite Earths greatly changed and altered the history of the DC Universe. Wonder Woman's history and origin were considerably revamped by the event. Wonder Woman was now an emissary and ambassador from Themyscira (the new name for Paradise Island) to Patriarch's World, charged with the mission of bringing peace to the outside world. Various deities and concepts from Greek mythology were blended and incorporated into Wonder Woman's stories and origin. Diana was formed out of clay of the shores of Themyscira by Hippolyta, who wished for a child; the clay figure was then brought to life by the Greek deities. The gods then blessed and granted her unique powers and abilities – beauty from Aphrodite, strength from Demeter, wisdom from Athena, speed and flight from Hermes, Eyes of the Hunter and unity with beasts from Artemis and sisterhood with fire and the ability to discern the truth from Hestia. Due to the reboot, Diana's operating methods were made distinctive from Superman and Batman's with her willingness to use deadly force when she judges it necessary. In addition, her previous history and her marriage to Steve Trevor were erased. Trevor was introduced as a man much older than Diana who would later on marry Etta Candy.

==== War of the Gods ====
Starting in Wonder Woman (vol. 2) #51, the Amazons, who had revealed their presence to the world in Wonder Woman (vol. 2) #50, are blamed for a series of murders and for the theft of various artifacts. The Amazons are then taken into custody, Queen Hippolyta is nowhere to be found and Steve Trevor is forced by General Yedziniak to attack Themyscira. These events lead to the "War of the Gods" occurring. The culprit of the murders, thefts and the framing of the Amazons is revealed to be the witch Circe, who "kills" Diana by reverting her form back into the clay she was born from. Later, Wonder Woman is brought back to life and together with Donna Troy, battles Circe and ultimately defeats her.

When Hippolyta and the other Amazons were trapped in a demonic dimension, she started receiving visions about the death of Wonder Woman. Fearing her daughter's death, Hippolyta created a false claim that Diana was not worthy of continuing her role as Wonder Woman, and arranged for a contest to determine who would be the new Wonder Woman, thus protecting Diana from her supposed fate. The participants of the final round were Diana and Artemis, and with the help of some mystic manipulation by Hippolyta, Artemis won the contest. Thus, Diana was forced to hand over her title and costume to Artemis, who became the new Wonder Woman and Diana started fighting crime in an alternate costume. Artemis later died in battle with the White Magician – thus, Hippolyta's vision of a dying Wonder Woman did come true, albeit not of Diana as Wonder Woman.

The demon Neron engaged Diana in battle and managed to kill her. The Olympian Gods granted Diana divinity and the role of the Goddess of Truth who started to reside in Olympus; her mother Hippolyta then assumed the role of Wonder Woman and wore her own different incarnation of the costume. In Wonder Woman (vol. 2) #136, Diana was banished from Olympus due to interfering in earthly matters (as Diana was unable to simply watch over people's misery on Earth). She immediately returned to her duties as Wonder Woman, but ran into conflicts with her mother over her true place and role as Hippolyta seemed accustomed to her life in America. Their fight remained unsolved, as Hippolyta died during an intergalactic war. Themyscira was destroyed during the war, but was restored and reformed as a collection of floating islands. Circe later resurrected Hippolyta in Wonder Woman (vol. 3) #8.

==== The OMAC Project ====
One of the events that led to the "Infinite Crisis" storyline was Wonder Woman killing the villain Maxwell Lord in Wonder Woman (vol. 2) #219. Maxwell Lord was mind-controlling Superman, who as a result was near to killing Batman. Wonder Woman tried to stop Superman, Lord (who was unable to mind control her) made Superman see her as his enemy Doomsday trying to kill Lois Lane. Superman then attacked Wonder Woman, and a vicious battle ensued. Buying herself time by slicing Superman's throat with her tiara, Wonder Woman caught Lord in her Lasso of Truth and demanded to know how to stop his control over Superman. As the lasso forced the wearer to speak only the truth, Lord told her that the only way to stop him was to kill him. Left with no choice, Wonder Woman snapped Lord's neck and ended his control over Superman. Unknown to her, the entire scene was broadcast live around every channel in the world by Brother Eye. The viewers were not aware of the entire situation, and saw only Wonder Woman murdering a Justice League associate. Wonder Woman's actions put her at odds with Batman and Superman, as they saw Wonder Woman as a cold-blooded killer, despite the fact that she saved their lives.

==== One Year Later ====
At the end of Infinite Crisis, Wonder Woman temporarily retires from her costumed identity. Diana, once again using the alias Diana Prince, joins the Department of Metahuman Affairs. Donna Troy becomes the new Wonder Woman and is captured by Diana's enemies. Diana then goes on a mission to rescue her sister, battling Circe and Hercules. Diana defeats the villains, freeing Donna and takes up the role of Wonder Woman again. Circe places a spell on Diana, which renders Diana into a normal, powerless human being when in the role of Diana Prince; her powers come to her only when she is in the role of Wonder Woman.

==== The Circle ====
The storyline "The Circle" was focused on the revelation of a failed assassination attempt on Diana when she was a baby, by four rogue Amazons. These Amazons – Myrto, Charis, Philomela and Alkyone, collectively referred to as The Circle – were Hippolyta's personal guards and were extremely loyal and devoted to her. However, when Hippolyta decided to raise a daughter, The Circle was horrified and considered the baby ill-fate, one who would ruin their entire race. Thus, after Diana was sculpted out of clay and brought to life, The Circle decided to assassinate the baby. Their attempt was foiled however, and the four Amazons were imprisoned. After years, the Circle escaped their prisons with the help of Captain Nazi, and decided to accomplish their previously failed mission and kill Diana. Diana defeated Myrto, Charis, and Philomela, then approached Alkyone, who runs off and succumbs to her death by falling into the ocean. The other three Amazons return to their prisons.

Issue #600 introduced Wonder Woman to an alternate timeline created by the Gods in which Themyscira had been destroyed and the Amazons scattered around the world. In this timeline, Diana is an orphan raised in New York who is learning to cope with her powers. The entire world has forgotten Wonder Woman's existence and the main story of this run was of Diana trying to restore reality even though she does not properly remember it herself. Diana has no memories of her prior adventures as Wonder Woman, recollecting her memories in bits and pieces and receiving different abilities and resources (such as the power of flight and her lasso) during the progression of her adventure. A trio of Death Goddesses called The Morrigan acted as Wonder Woman's main enemies. Diana ultimately defeats the evil goddesses and returns everything back to normal.

=== 21st century ===
==== The New 52 ====
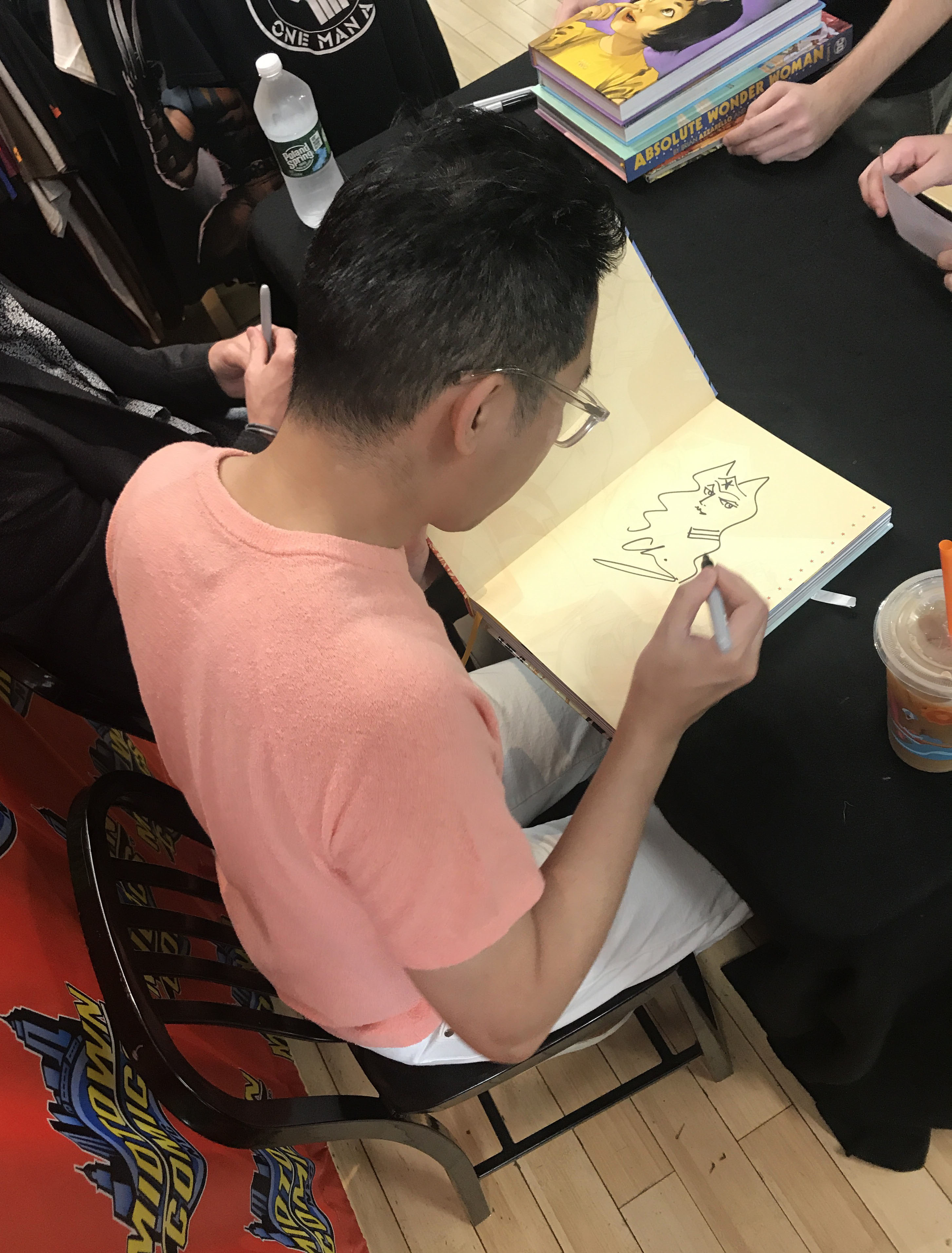
Cliff Chiang, who drew the New 52 version of the Wonder Woman series, sketching the character in a fan's copy of one of the Absolute editions collecting that work, at a signing at Midtown Comics in Manhattan

In the New 52, Diana's lore was significantly revamped, including her now being the demigoddess daughter of Queen Hippolyta and Zeus. Her original origin is revealed as a cover story to explain Diana's birth as a means to protect her from Hera's wrath. And currently, Diana has taken on the role and title as the new "God of War".

The Greek messenger god, Hermes, entrusts Wonder Woman with the protection of Zola, a young woman, who is pregnant with Zeus's child, from Hera, seething with jealousy and determined to kill the child. The story focuses on Wonder Woman's quest to rescue Zola from Hades, who had abducted her and taken her to Hell at the end of the sixth issue of the series. The male children of the Amazons are introduced and Diana learns about the birth of her "brothers".

After saving Zola from Hades, Wonder Woman tries to protect her further from Apollo, as it is prophesied that one of Zeus' children will be his downfall whom Apollo considers to be Zola's child. Wonder Woman receives the power of flight by one of Hermes' feathers piercing her thigh and Zola's baby is stolen by Hermes at the end and given to Demeter.

A stand-alone #0 issue was released in September which explored Diana's childhood and her tutelage under Ares, the God of War, now known most often as simply 'War'. The main plot of the issue was Diana training under War as he thought of her being an extraordinary girl with immense potential.

Wonder Woman appears as one of the lead characters in the Justice League title written by Geoff Johns and drawn by Jim Lee that was launched in 2011 as part of The New 52. In August 2012, she and Superman shared a kiss in Justice League (vol. 2) #12, which developed into a romantic relationship. DC launched a Superman/Wonder Woman series that debuted in late 2013, which focuses both on the threats they face together, and on their romance as a "Power Couple".

==== Earth 2 ====
The New 52 version of Earth 2 was introduced in Earth 2 #1 (2012). In that issue, the Earth 2 Wonder Woman is introduced via flashback. She, along with Superman and Batman, are depicted dying in battle with forces from Apokolips five years in the past. This Wonder Woman worshiped the deities of Roman mythology as opposed to the Greek; the Roman gods perish as a result of the conflict. An earlier version of the Earth-2 Wonder Woman, prior to the Apokoliptian invasion, is seen in the comic book Batman/Superman, where she is seen riding a pegasus.

In Earth 2 #8 (2013), Wonder Woman's adult daughter, Fury, is introduced. She is loyal to the Apokoliptian Steppenwolf.

==== DC Rebirth ====
In 2016, DC Comics implemented DC Rebirth, the second relaunch since 2011's The New 52, which reset some of the continuity changes effected by The New 52.

Following the events of the Darkseid War, Wonder Woman is told by the dying Myrina Black that on the night of Diana's birth, Hippolyta gave birth to a twin brother who was born after her. This child was revealed to be male, known as Jason of Themyscira, and is said to be incredibly powerful. Wonder Woman makes it her mission to find him.

The "Lies" story arc runs parallel with and explores Diana's search. No longer able to get into Mount Olympus, Diana tracks down Barbara Ann Minerva, the Cheetah, to get help.

In the "Watchmen" sequel "Doomsday Clock," Doctor Poison attended the meeting established by the Riddler and mentioned a rumor that Wonder Woman was forcefully dragged back to Themyscira by her fellow Amazons. Wonder Woman comes out of hiding to address the United Nations, hoping to defuse the metahuman arms race. However, the summit is interrupted by Black Adam, the Creeper, and Giganta, who take advantage of the absence of most of Earth's superheroes to attack the UN at the time when the superheroes were confronting Doctor Manhattan on Mars.

==== Wonder Woman Historia: The Amazons ====
Despite being an Amazon, Diana herself is only a supporting character in Wonder Woman Historia: the Amazons. Inspired by George Pérez's 1980s reworking, Kelly Sue DeConnick wrote the three issue-limited series in celebration of the 80th anniversary of the DC Comics superheroine and was illustrated by Phil Jimenez, Gene Ha, and Nicola Scott.

Wonder Woman Historia: the Amazons begins with seven Greek goddesses-Hestia, Artemis, Demeter, Hecate, Aphrodite, Athena, and Hera-demanding that all mortal men be punished for abusing women, only for their request to be turned down by the womanizing Zeus. Despite the Amazons being her own idea, Hera does not join the other goddesses as they regroup at the Well of Souls (called the Well of the Lost in this retelling), each of them creating a quintet of female warriors from murdered women's souls. Composed of six tribes each with its own queen and patron goddess, the thirty Amazons travel the ancient world to rescue women from male traffickers whom they kill in acts of vigilantism; however, the Amazons only go on their missions at night when Artemis can watch over them, and hide themselves during the day to keep their existence a secret from the male gods, especially Zeus. In this version, Hippolyta starts out as a midwife's widowed assistant rather than a founding Amazon member. After being ordered to abandon an unwanted newborn girl, Hippolyta changes her mind, racing against the elements to save the baby and encounters the Amazons when they rescue her from traffickers.

As Hera turns the abandoned baby's soul into a bird to spy on the Amazons, Hippolyta makes a deal with Artemis to become one of them. Hippolyta then becomes a queen of her own Amazon tribe, which is made up of the women the female warriors rescue and bring back to their secret hideout to train in their way of life and have all six creator goddesses as their patrons. But one day when the sun is up, one young Amazon kills a murdered trafficker's son praying to Apollo, exposing the female warriors' existence to the male gods, who then send an all-male army to annihilate the Amazons.

As the Amazons battle against the gods and their soldiers, Hippolyta leads them all as their sole queen. But when the Amazons suffer many losses, Hippolyta travels to Olympus and makes a bargain with Zeus: her sisters' lives in exchange for their freedom. Except for the one who had killed the boy in Apollo's temple, all the Amazons, dead and living, are given long lives yet are forever imprisoned on Themyscira, where are they allowed to do as they please while under the sun god's watch; once a month, Artemis is allowed temporary guardianship of the warriors she had helped create. Grieving over depriving her sisters their freedom, Hippolyta makes a clay baby girl, whom the seven goddesses bless with gifts and reincarnate from the soul of the very child the Queen of the Amazons was ordered to abandon. Named after the moon goddess, Diana will grow up to become Wonder Woman and continue her mother and their sister Amazons' fight for women's justice.

==== Infinite Frontier and The Dawn of DC ====
In the Infinite Frontier era, Diana's mother Hippolyta becomes an Olympian and leaves behind the throne of Themyscira to Nubia.

During The Dawn of DC relaunch, writer Tom King took over as the writer of the main Wonder Woman book, with Daniel Sampere as the primary artist. King and Sampere's run introduced a new daughter of Diana and Steve Trevor's named Elizabeth "Lizzie" Prince. King's run also saw the return of Diana's clay origin in mainline continuity.

== Other versions ==
=== Wonder Woman (Earth-Two) ===
Princess Diana of Paradise Island—the Wonder Woman of Earth-Two—was a member of the All-Star Squadron and secretary (and later a member) for the Justice Society of America. As Diana Prince, she worked in the U.S. War Department as an assistant to intelligence officer Steve Trevor. Decades later she and Trevor married and had a daughter, Lyta (also known as Fury). Although Diana was retconned out of existence in Crisis on Infinite Earths and All-Star Squadron #60, she was later restored to the present.

==== Early history ====
Diana, Princess of the Amazons of Earth-Two, was born on the mystical Paradise Island several hundred years before becoming known as Wonder Woman. Isolated from the cruelty and corruption of men, the Amazons lived and worked in peace and obeyed the will of Aphrodite and Athena. Longing for a child of her own, Hippolyta (Queen of the Amazons) begged the gods to grant her request and turn her clay statue into a real girl. In sympathy, Aphrodite relented and animated the statue; the girl leaped off the pedestal into her mother's arms. Hippolyta named her for the moon goddess, Diana (who became her godmother).

Hippolyta raised her daughter as an Amazon, with the privileges of royalty. Diana aged slowly, stopping aging when reaching adulthood (as did all Amazons). She surpassed most of her Amazon sisters in skills and intelligence, running faster than a deer at age five and easily uprooting a tree at three.

Diana was a contented Amazon until Captain Steve Trevor crash-landed on Paradise Island. Although she had never seen a man before, Diana was attracted to him (despite his injuries). Violating the island rule against taking in outsiders, Diana brought the unconscious Trevor back to the Amazons in an attempt to save his life. In response to her pleas, Hippolyta used the healing Purple Ray on Trevor and saved his life.

Discovering that the outside world was at war, Diana wanted to help stop it. Hippolyta refused, saying that they should not involve themselves in the ways of outsiders. However, the goddesses Aphrodite and Athena appeared to Hippolyta; they said it was time for an Amazon to travel to "Man's World" and fight the Nazis. Ares felt that he ruled the world; Aphrodite wanted to help America win, claiming it was the last citadel of democracy. A tournament was held to determine the Amazon champion; although forbidden by Hippolyta to participate, Princess Diana concealed her identity with a mask. After winning all the contests Diana revealed her identity to her mother, who feared she would never see her daughter again.

However, Hippolyta allowed her daughter to dress as Wonder Woman and travel to the outside world. Diana returned Steve Trevor to the United States, adopting the identity of a U.S. Army nurse (Diana Prince) so she could stay with Trevor as he recovered; she helped him against a Japanese agent.

Diana began to appear publicly as Wonder Woman. As Earth-Two Diana Prince, she joined the U.S. Navy as a lieutenant and became Col. Darnell's secretary. In actual Golden Age comics, the character joins the U.S. Army and in one occasion returned to nursing. The real Diana Prince later returned and tried to assume Diana's role, since her inventor husband was having financial trouble selling his weapon to the army. Wonder Woman saved Diana when she is kidnapped by a Japanese agent trying to steal the weapon; when it is successful Diana Prince began using her married name, leaving Wonder Woman in her identity.

Diana continued fighting crime with the Justice Society of America (on Earth-Two) as their first female member, although she was relegated to secretarial work for the Justice Society (despite her super powers). She was shown taking dictation and typing the team's minutes as Wonder Woman. Diana rejoined the team when it reformed and expanded (as the All-Star Squadron). She continued fighting crime after the war and resisted being recalled to Paradise Island, preferring to surrender her immortality rather than her independence.

==== Powers ====
Earth-Two Wonder Woman has superhuman speed, strength, agility and accuracy. Her speed and agility are as great as the god Mercury, but less than the pre-crisis Earth-Two Flash (as in her battle with Garrick, when she is possessed by the Stream of Ruthlessness). She can leap 40 feet (12 m), an Amazon record. She is originally immortal; however, to stay in a "man's world" after her mission she surrenders her immortality and begins to age as a normal human. She can glide on wind currents but rarely uses this gliding ability, preferring to depend on her invisible plane to travel long distances at great speed.

Imbued with the strength of Hercules, the Earth-Two Wonder Woman is strong enough to rip steel-door off their hinges with little to no effort, easily uproot might Oak trees, and lift elephants and massive rocks as if they were cardboard boxes. Her strength is comparable with the Earth-Two Superman. She has more resistance than a human; an electric current which would kill a normal human only knocks her out. Diana demonstrates knowledge of every terrestrial language and advanced scientific knowledge. She hypnotizes Etta Candy's brother Mint, although her magic lasso (unlike the modern version) gives her mind control over others. Her Amazon training gives her hand-to-hand combat skills, useful for wrestling and binding opponents. Wonder Woman can telepathically communicate with the Holiday Girls with a mental radio (which can also be used by Etta Candy), and her knowledge of psychology can heal minds. She has magnetic hearing due to her earrings, which were given to her by the Venusian fairy Queen Desira for stopping the Meteor Men from attacking her planet.

==== Marriage ====
The 1985 miniseries America vs. the Justice Society depicts Diana continuing to fight crime in the 1950s. Unlike many other masked heroes, who the federal government forces to reveal their identity, she admits no secret identity but admits she is an Amazon. However, she continues to use the alias Diana Prince.

During this period, Diana explores her romantic interest in her longtime crime-fighting partner, Steve Trevor. Diana reveals herself as Wonder Woman to him; although initially taken aback, Trevor marries her. Diana later retires from active duty in the Navy and becomes a housewife, raising their daughter Hippolyta "Lyta" Trevor (named after Diana's mother).

==== Later adventures ====
Diana rejoined the (reformed) Justice Society of America during the 1960s; she was one of the JSA members placed in suspended animation by JSA villain Vandal Savage, and was freed by Barry Allen. However, she preferred to spend her time at home raising her daughter. During this time, Earth-Two Diana met her younger Earth-One counterpart. She was later summoned by the god Mercury (with other heroes of Earth-2, Earth-1 and Earth-S) when beast-man Kull of Atlantis wanted to destroy humanity on all three earths after capturing the elders (who empowered the Marvel Family). She helped stop Queen Clea, one of his henchmen, from taking over the Earth-Two Atlantis in a story involving the Squadron of Justice. The Wonder Women became good friends.

Diana was one of the Justice Society members ambushed by her earth's Superman (under the control of the Ultra Humanite) and drowned in Koehaha, the river of evil. She, Superman, Hawkman, Green Lantern, Robin and the Atom committed a number of crimes as they sought to act on their deepest desires, and fought their children/proteges (the newly formed Infinity Inc) in the process. Diana fought her daughter to a standstill and nearly killed Hawkman's son, the Silver Scarab, as she sought to rob a museum. Her goal was to obtain a rare herb said to confer eternal life and give it to her husband so that she would not have to face decades alone when Steve inevitably died before she did. She accidentally injured Steve in the battle and took him to Paradise Island for healing. Eventually, Diana and her teammates were freed from the water's influence and she went back to her retirement with a recovering Steve

==== Crisis on Infinite Earths ====
Diana continued in her role as an elder stateswoman in the superhero community until the Crisis on Infinite Earths came to Earth-Two and erased its existence. She fought well and was protected from erasure at the end of the crisis by ascending to Mount Olympus with her husband. Both were forgotten by the history of the new Primary Earth, except for their daughter (who was reformatted into the new universe as the daughter of Helena Kosmatos: Fury of World War II).

==== Infinite Crisis ====
When the new, post-crisis Wonder Woman broke up a riot in Boston, she was interrupted by a woman she thought was her mother (Queen Hippolyta); Hippolyta was the golden-age Wonder Woman via time travel in her continuity. The intruder identified herself as Earth-Two Wonder Woman Diana Prince, who left Mount Olympus to guide Diana. She advised her post-Crisis counterpart to be "the one thing you haven't been for a very long time...human". She urged Diana to intervene in a fight between Superman and his counterpart, Kal-L. Having left Mount Olympus, with her gods' blessings gone, Diana Prince faded away.

=== Wonder Woman (Earth-One) ===
==== Volume One ====
The demigod Hercules has captured Queen Hippolyta and several other Amazons, degrading the queen in front of her subjects. Hippolyta begs for aid from Aphrodite, who reveals that Hippolyta must reclaim her girdle to protect from harm against Hercules. She does so, and seduces Hercules long enough to break his neck with her own chains. She then frees her fellow Amazons and defeat Hercules's band of soldiers. The queen once again prays to Aphrodite to retire the Amazons from the world of man.

3,000 years later, Wonder Woman returns to Paradise Island where she is placed under arrest for consorting in "man's world". The trial is witnessed by the Fates, as well as a crowd of Amazons including Nubia. Diana begins her story by recalling a moment with Althea, keeper of the Purple Ray. Diana uses the ray to heal Dindra, an injured deer. Althea asks if Diana will participate in the games to honor the goddess Diana, but she replies that her mother Hippolyta does not wish her to as she would have an unfair advantage with her powers. During the festival, Diana appears wearing the lion headdress of Hercules, then runs off while the others chase after her. Diana travels to the shore, where she finds a man who falls to the ground.

In the present time, Hippolyta calls Althea forward to testify. Althea explains that she went to identify a noise in her laboratory, but when she returned, the Purple Ray had disappeared, suggesting Diana took it. Diana reveals she took the ray to heal the man, Steve Trevor. She later challenged the champion Mala to a battle. Diana wins, and claims Mala's swan plane. Later, Hippolyta scolds Diana for her actions. She smells a familiar fragrance on Diana, then realizes it must be a man. After Diana leaves, she orders the Amazons to search out Paradise Island and find him.

Elsewhere, Diana leads Steve to the swan plane, but is ambushed by Mala and several others. Mala is then called to testify in the present time. She angrily states that Diana broke tradition. Mala chases after Diana's plane but Diana manages to escape. Mala returns to Hippolyta, who plans to recruit Medusa from the Underworld.

Diana flies Steve back to the United States and brings him to a hospital. While in the hospital, Diana finds many elderly women who are dying and begins to panic. She attempts to flee, but she is confronted by several soldiers. She fights them off, then decides to leave. In the present, Etta Candy, called Beth, is summoned to testify. She recalls her first meeting with Diana: the bus carrying her and the Holliday Girls crashes and falls off a cliff, but Diana saves them. Beth scolds Hippolyta for her treatment of her daughter.

Later, Steve is questioned by authorities until Diana and the Holliday Girls appear. Steve then coins the name "Wonder Woman" for the Amazon. Beth then remembers how she created Wonder Woman's costume for her. Soon after, Medusa attacks the hotel they were staying in and turns Steve into stone. The Amazons confront Diana and order her to come with them. She does so, under the promise of a trial.

In present time, Steve's stone body is brought forth. Diana reveals she worked on the Purple Ray for it to affect men, and heals Steve from his petrification. Diana calls Hippolyta forward to testify, and discovers that she was born from Hercules's seed. Diana forgives Hippolyta's lies and embraces her, then travels back to the United States to complete her journey as Wonder Woman.

=== Kingdom Come ===
Kingdom Come Wonder Woman: In the Kingdom Come storyline by Mark Waid and Alex Ross, Wonder Woman is depicted as a hardened warrior who has become more aggressive in her methods of justice. She wears a black variation of her classic costume and carries a sword, reflecting a darker and more uncompromising version of the character.

=== Flashpoint ===
Flashpoint Wonder Woman: In the Flashpoint universe, Wonder Woman's origins are drastically altered. She is portrayed as the fierce queen of the Amazons, leading them into a war with Aquaman's Atlanteans. This version of Diana is more ruthless and willing to resort to extreme measures in order to achieve her goals.

=== Red Son ===
Red Son Wonder Woman: In the DC Elseworlds story Superman: Red Son, Wonder Woman is reimagined as a Soviet Union ally and participant in the Cold War. Her character embodies Soviet ideologies, fighting against the American superhero, Batman.

=== Earth 11 ===
On Earth-11, also known as the "Gender Reversed Earth," most of the DC superheroes are of the opposite gender. Wonder Woman is portrayed as Wonder Man, an Amazon warrior and member of the Justice Guild.

=== Absolute Wonder Woman ===
The series focuses on a version of Wonder Woman who was raised in Hell rather than Themyscira as in most depictions of the character. Being given to the imprisoned witch Circe by the Gods, Diana grows up learning magic and uses them to protect the world from supernatural threats once escaping from Hell. Written by Kelly Thompson and illustrated by Hayden Sherman, it was announced as part of DC Comics's Absolute Universe imprint. Absolute Wonder Woman began publication on October 23, 2024.

=== DC X Sonic the Hedgehog ===
Wonder Woman is also a major character in the intercompany crossover DC X Sonic the Hedgehog, which features Wonder Woman and her teammates from the Justice League teaming up with Sonic and his friends in battling against Darkseid and his forces, and later Doctor Eggman and the Legion of Doom. During the series, Wonder Woman forms a close bond with Amy Rose.

== Powers and abilities ==
=== Powers and training ===
Wonder Woman without special powers fighting crime as Diana Prince. Cover of Wonder Woman#189 (July 1970) by Mike Sekowsky.

Diana is depicted as a masterful athlete, acrobat, fighter and strategist, trained and experienced in many ancient and modern forms of armed and unarmed combat, including exclusive Amazonian martial arts. With her godlike abilities of incalculable superhuman strength, nigh-invulnerability, speed, flight, fast healing and semi-immortality, Diana's fighting prowess is enhanced. In some versions, her mother trained her, as Wonder Girl, for a future career as Wonder Woman. From the beginning, she is portrayed as highly skilled in using her Amazon bracelets to stop bullets and in wielding her golden lasso. Batman once called her the "best melee fighter in the world". The modern version of the character is known to use lethal force when she deems it necessary. In the New 52 continuity, her superior combat skills are the result of her Amazon training, as well as receiving further training from Ares, the God of War, himself, since as early as her childhood. The Golden Age Wonder Woman also had education in advanced arts and sciences as well as psychology, emotions, and emotional intelligence, as did her Amazon sisters.

==== Pre-Crisis ====
The Golden Age Wonder Woman had strength that was comparable to the Golden Age Superman. Wonder Woman was capable of bench pressing 15,000 pounds even before she had received her bracelets, and later hoisted a 50,000-pound boulder above her head to inspire Amazons facing the test. Even when her super strength was temporarily nullified, she still had enough mortal strength of an Amazon to break down a prison door to save Steve Trevor. In one of her earliest appearances, she is shown running easily at 60 mph (97 km/h), and later jumps from a building and lands on the balls of her feet.

Her strength would be removed in accordance with "Aphrodite's Law" if she allowed her bracelets to be bound or chained by a male.

She also had an array of mental and psychic abilities, as corresponding to Marston's interest in parapsychology and metaphysics. Such an array included ESP, astral projection, telepathy (with or without the Mental Radio), mental control over the electricity in her body, the Amazonian ability to turn brain energy into muscle power, etc. Wonder Woman first became immune to electric shocks after having her spirit stripped from her atoms by Dr. Psycho's Electro Atomizer; it was also discovered that she was unable to send a mental radio message without her body.

Wonder Woman #105 revealed that Diana was formed from clay by the Queen of the Amazons, given life and power by four of the Greek and Roman gods (otherwise known as the Olympian deities) as gifts, corresponding to her renowned epithet: "Beautiful as Aphrodite, wise as Athena, swifter than Hermes, and stronger than Hercules", making her the strongest of the Amazons. Wonder Woman's Amazon training gave her limited telepathy, profound scientific knowledge, and the ability to speak every language – even caveman and Martian languages.

Between 1966 and 1967, new powers were added, such as super breath.

In the Silver and Bronze Ages of comics, Wonder Woman was able to further increase her strength. In times of great need, removing her bracelets would temporarily augment her power tenfold, but cause her to go berserk in the process.

==== Post-Crisis ====
In the Post-Crisis universe, Wonder Woman receives her super powers as a blessing from Olympian deities just like the Silver Age version before, but with changes to some of her powers: She is considered one of the mightiest beings in the DC multiverse.

- Demeter, the goddess of agriculture and fertility, blessed Diana with strength drawn from the Earth spirit Gaea... Stronger than Hercules... making her one of the physically strongest heroes in the DC Universe and the strongest female hero in the DC Universe. This strength has allowed her to even battle Superman and Supergirl. She has also held her own against Darkseid. Her connection to the earth allows her to heal at an accelerated rate so long as she is in contact with the planet. In rare cases where she has been gravely injured, Diana showed the ability to physically merge with the earth, causing whatever injuries or poisons to be expelled from her body; such an act is considered sacred, and can only be used in extreme cases.
- Pallas Athena, the goddess of wisdom and war, granted Diana great wisdom, intelligence, and military prowess. Athena's gift has enabled Diana to master over a dozen languages (including those of alien origin), multiple complex crafts, sciences and philosophies, as well as leadership, military strategy, and armed and unarmed combat. More recently, Athena bound her own eyesight to Diana's, granting her increased empathy.
- Artemis, goddess of the hunt, animals, and the Moon, graced Diana with the Eyes of the Hunter and unity with beasts, meaning Diana can communicate with all animals, including dinosaurs. The Eyes of the Hunter ability gives Diana a full range of enhanced senses, including telescopic vision and super hearing.
- Hestia, goddess of hearth and home, granted Diana sisterhood with fire. This power has been shown to control the "Fires of Truth", which Diana wields through her lasso, making anyone bound by it unable to lie. This ability also grants her resistance to both normal and supernatural fire.
- Hermes, the messenger god of speed, granted Diana superhuman speed and the ability to fly. She is capable of flying at speeds approaching half the speed of light. She can react quickly enough to deflect bullets, lasers, and other projectiles with her virtually impenetrable bracelets. After the 2011 relaunch of the character, Wonder Woman does not naturally possess the power of flight. She gains it once she is hit by a feather thrown by Hermes.
- Aphrodite, goddess of love, bestowed Diana with stunning beauty, as well as a kind heart.

While not completely invulnerable, she is highly resistant to great amounts of concussive force and extreme temperatures. However, edged weapons or projectiles applied with sufficient force are able to pierce her skin.

She is able to astrally project herself into various lands of myth. Her physical body reacts to whatever happens to her on the mythical astral plane, leaving her body cut, bruised, or sometimes strengthened once her mind and body are reunited. She can apparently leave the planet through meditation and did this once to rescue Artemis while she was in Hell.

During the era following DC's New 52 relaunch, Diana's abilities were expanded in ways that reflected the recent narrative revelations that she is the daughter of Zeus. This showed she could create a thunderous explosion or expel lightning when she clashed her bracelets together, along with the reveal that the bracelets served to constrain her full divine powers. After becoming God of War in same run, Diana takes on some of Ares's patron god abilities; in Superman/Wonder Woman #8 she demonstrates telepathic rapport with a soldier, explaining "I am War. I know all soldiers, and they know me." These changes were never seen again following the DC Rebirth initiative, which relaunched Wonder Woman with a story called "The Lies" that said everything that happened in the New 52 Wonder Woman series had been an elaborate hoax.

Wonder Woman's revised look on the cover of Wonder Woman (vol. 5)#16 (April 2017). Art by Bilquis Evely and Romulo Fajardo Jr.

=== Weapons and other abilities ===
==== Pre-Crisis outfits ====
At the time of her debut, Wonder Woman sported a red top with a golden eagle emblem, a white belt, blue star-spangled subligaculum, and red and golden go-go boots. She originally wore a skirt; however according to Elizabeth Marston, "It was too hard to draw and would have been over her head most of the time." This outfit was entirely based on the American flag, because Wonder Woman was purely an American icon as she debuted during World War II. Later in 1942, Wonder Woman's outfit received a slight change – the culottes were converted entirely into skin-tight shorts and she wore sandals. While earlier most of her back was exposed, during the imposition of the Comics Code Authority in the mid-1950s, Wonder Woman's outfit was rectified to make her back substantially covered, to comply with the Authority's rule of minimum exposure. During Mike Sekowsky's run in the late 1960s, Diana surrendered her powers and started using her own skills to fight crime. She wore a series of jumpsuits as her attire; the most popular of these was a white one.

After Sekowsky's run ended in the early 1970s, Diana's roots were reverted to her old mythological ones and she wore a more modernized version of her original outfit, a predecessor to her "bathing suit" outfit. Later, in 1976, her glowing white belt was turned into a yellow one. For Series 3, artist Terry Dodson redrew her outfit as a strapless swimsuit.

A retrospective of Wonder Woman's costume changes was offered in Issue #211, cover-dated April–May 1974, on page 52 which details the changes in her costume from her 1) initial very briefly lasting one with culottes, or perhaps more specifically, a skort, to 2) the "hot-pants" style costume which would last through the rest of the golden-age years and through much of the 1950s, to 3) the sandaled-look of the late 1950s to mid 1960s, to 4) her plain-clothes civilian look the character adopted during the timeframe of late 1968 to the end of 1972 when the character was without her superpowers, to 5) the slightly-modified-from-the-golden-age costume she returned to when her superpowers were restored in 1973.

==== Bronze Age outfit ====
What is perhaps the first-ever historical retrospective of Wonder Woman's costume changes was offered in the volume 1, special 100-page issue #211, cover-dated April–May 1974, on page 52, which briefly illustrates the costume changes over the first 32 years of the character's history. Art by various artists.

A significant change in the iconography of Wonder Woman's costume occurred in the special Wonder Woman story insert in DC Comics Presents #41, cover-dated January 1982. The eagle design on her breastplate was changed to a 'double-W' design. Art by Gene Colan.

It was late in the Bronze Age, however, when what is possibly the single-most-significant change in the iconography of Wonder Woman's costume occurred. Various sources explain "[u]nder the leadership of Jenette Kahn, DC Comics' first female publisher", "something very special happened to the character. This super heroine was bestowed with her own logo...[that] became a distinguishing factor. The logo was easily identifiable" and was "an iconic chest emblem [that put her] on par with her crusading colleagues Batman and Superman." The logo was a "stylized eagle that had been in place since 1941, replaced with a stacked double W" and "variations on the stacked 'WW' logo have been central to every costume since."

In DC Comics Presents #41, (January 1982), on page 7 of the special Wonder Woman insert, a character identified as "Liz" on the previous page, who states that she is a representative of an organization called the Wonder Woman Foundation, explains "We've been promised full financial backing to promote equality for women everywhere, if we can use your name...and if you'll just wear this charming top from now on, instead of your old one!"

Liz then gives Wonder Woman the new breastplate on which a 'double-W' design replaces the eagle design on the previous breastplate, the first time the breastplate's design had changed in the 40 years of the character's existence. Later on page 14, Queen Hippolyta advises her to "Wear the new halter for a time, at least, for the good it will do." Wonder Woman agrees by saying, "Wait! I just realized...you're right! The cause will make the 'W' stand not just for 'Wonder Woman'...but for women everywhere".

==== Post-Crisis outfit ====
After Crisis on Infinite Earths, George Pérez rebooted the character in 1987. She wore an outfit similar to her 1970s one, but now with a larger glowing golden belt. This outfit continued until William Messner-Loebs' run, which had Diana pass on the role of Wonder Woman to Artemis. No longer Wonder Woman, Diana sported a new black biker-girl outfit designed by artist Mike Deodato Jr. After John Byrne took over writing and art duties, he redesigned the Wonder Woman outfit (Diana was reinstated as Wonder Woman at the end of Loebs' run) and joined the emblem and belt together.

Her outfit was not given any prominent change until after the 2005–2006 "Infinite Crisis" storyline. Similar to her chestplate, her glowing belt was also shaped into a "W". This outfit continued until issue #600 – J. Michael Straczynski's run of Wonder Woman's altered timeline changed her outfit drastically. Her outfit was redesigned by Jim Lee and included a redesigned emblem, a golden and red top, black pants, and a later discontinued blue-black jacket.

==== The New 52 outfit ====
Another major outfit change for Wonder Woman came about as part of DC Comics' 2011 relaunch of its entire line of publications, The New 52. The character's original one-piece outfit was restored, although the color combination of red and blue was changed to dark red and blue-black. Her chest-plate, belt and tiara were also changed from gold to a platinum or sterling silver color. Along with her sword, she now also uses a shield. She wears many accessories such as arm and neck jewelry styled as the "WW" motif. Her outfit is no longer made of fabric, as it now resembles a type of light, flexible body armor. Her boots are now a very dark blue rather than red. The design previously included black trousers, but they were removed and the one-piece look was restored during the time of publication.

==== Wonder Woman (2017 film) outfit ====
Her tiara's signature star symbol is now an eight-pointed starburst. According to designer Lindy Hemming and director Patty Jenkins, every design decision made for Themyscira came down to the same question: "How would I want to live that's badass?" "To me, they shouldn't be dressed in armor like men. It should be different. It should be authentic and real ... and appealing to women." When asked about the decision to give the Amazons heeled sandals, Jenkins explained that they also have flats for fighting, adding "It's total wish-fulfillment ... I, as a woman, want Wonder Woman to be sexy, hot as hell, fight badass, and look great at the same time ... the same way men want Superman to have ridiculously huge pecs and an impractically big body. That makes them feel like the hero they want to be. And my hero, in my head, has really long legs."

==== Invisible Plane ====
The Invisible Plane in Sensation Comics #1 (Jan. 1942); art by Ross Andru and Dick Giordano; design in this illustration closely resembles the Gloster Javelin

The Golden, Silver, and Bronze Age portrayals of Wonder Woman showed her using a silent and invisible plane that could be controlled by mental command and fly at speeds up to 3,000 mph (4,800 km/h). Its appearance has varied over time; originally it had a propeller, while later it was drawn as a jet aircraft resembling a stealth aircraft.

Shortly thereafter, Wonder Woman is shown being able to summon it with her tiara, have it hover by the War Department, and extend from it a rope ladder with which she could board it. She uses the plane to fly into outer space, and frequently transports Etta Candy and the Holliday Girls, Steve Trevor, and others. During the 1950s, the plane becomes a jet, and is often shown swooping over Lt. Prince's office; she strips out of her uniform at super speed and bounds to the plane. Though the plane was depicted as semi-transparent for the reader's convenience, in-story dialogue indicated that it actually was completely invisible, or at least able to become so as the need arose. Wonder Woman continued to use the Invisible Plane for super speed, outer space, and multi-dimensional transport up until the unpowered era of Diana Prince. When Wonder Woman resumed superpowered, costumed operations in 1973, she continued to use the jet as before, but did glide on air currents for short distances. At one point, Aphrodite granted the plane the power to fly faster than the speed of light for any interstellar voyages her champion might undertake.

In post-Crisis continuity, the Invisible Plane is tinkered by gremlins and is reimagined as a sentient alien crystal named Dome that can transform into several vehicles, including an invisible plane. In Wonder Woman (vol. 2) #201, Dome sacrifices itself to stop a tsunami and is rendered inanimate.

==== Lasso of Truth ====
The Lasso of Truth, or Lasso of Hestia, was forged by Hephaestus from the golden girdle of Gaea. The original form of the Lasso in the Golden Age was called the Magic Lasso of Aphrodite. It compels all beings who come into contact with it to tell the absolute truth and is virtually indestructible; in Identity Crisis, Green Arrow mistakenly describes it as "the only lie detector designed by Zeus." The only times it has been broken were when Wonder Woman herself refused to accept the truth revealed by the lasso, such as when she confronted Rama Khan; and by Bizarro in Matt Wagner's non-canonical Batman/Superman/Wonder Woman: Trinity. During the Golden Age, the original form of the Lasso had the power to force anyone caught to obey any command given them, even overriding the mind control of others; this was effective enough to defeat strong-willed beings like Captain Marvel.

==== Bracelets of Submission ====
My strength is gone... it is Aphrodite's Law! When an Amazon permits a man to chain her Bracelets of Submission together, she becomes weak as other women in a man-ruled world!

— Wonder Woman

Diana's bulletproof bracelets were formed from the remnants of Athena's legendary shield, the Aegis, to be awarded to her champion. The shield was made from the indestructible hide of the great she-goat, Amalthea, who suckled Zeus as an infant. These forearm guards have thus far proven nigh-indestructible (the Omega Beams of Grail have proven able to shatter them), and are able to absorb the impact of incoming attacks, allowing Wonder Woman to deflect automatic weapon fire and energy blasts. Diana can slam the bracelets together to create a wave of concussive force capable of making strong beings like Superman's ears bleed. Recently, she gained the ability to channel Zeus's lightning through her bracelets as well. Zeus explained to her that this power had been contained within the bracelets since their creation, because they were once part of the Aegis, and that he had only recently unlocked it for her use. After the 2011 relaunch of the character, it was revealed that Diana was the daughter of Zeus and Hippolyta and that the bracelets are able to keep the powers she had inherited from Zeus in check. In addition, Hephaestus has modified the bracelets to allow Wonder Woman the sorcerous ability to manifest a sword of grayish metal from each bracelet. Each sword, marked with a red star, takes shape from a flash of lightning, and when Wonder Woman is done with them, the swords disappear, supposedly, back into her bracelets. As such, she has produced other weapons from the bracelets in this way such as a bow that fires explosive arrows, spears and energy bolts among others.

The inspiration to give Diana bracelets came from the pair of bracelets worn by Olive Byrne, creator William Moulton Marston's research assistant and lover. "Wonder Woman and her sister Amazons have to wear heavy bracelets to remind them of what happens to a girl when she lets a man conquer her," quoted Marston in a 1942 interview. "The Amazons once surrendered to the charm of some handsom Greeks and what a mess they got themselves into. The Greeks put them in chains of the Hitler type, beat them, and made them work like horses in the fields. Aphrodite, goddess of love, finally freed these unhappy girls. But she laid down the rule ("Aphrodite's Law") that they must never surrender to a man for any reason. I know of no better advice to give modern day women than this rule that Aphrodite gave the Amazon girls."

==== Other items ====
Diana rescues Steve Trevor from the sea and frantically creates the Purple Ray to heal him.

During the Golden Age, Wonder Woman possessed a Purple Ray capable of healing even a fatal gunshot wound to the brain. She invented the ray herself to heal Steve Trevor from injuries he sustained when his plane was shot down and he was left adrift in the sea for days.

Diana occasionally uses additional weaponry in formal battle, such as ceremonial golden armour with golden wings, pteruges, chestplate, and golden helmet in the shape of an eagle's head. She possesses a magical sword forged by Hephaestus that is sharp enough to cut the electrons off an atom. As early as the 1950s, Wonder Woman's tiara has also been used as a razor-edged throwing weapon, returning to her like a boomerang. The tiara allows Wonder Woman to be invulnerable from telepathic attacks, as well as allowing her to telepathically contact people such as the Amazons back on Themyscira using the power of the red star ruby in its center. As a temporary inductee into the Star Sapphires, Wonder Woman gained access to the violet power ring of love. This ring allowed her to alter her costume at will, create solid-light energy constructs, and reveal a person's true love to them. She was able to combine the energy with her lasso to enhance its ability. She also possessed a Mental Radio that could let her receive messages from those in need.

== Cultural impact ==
=== Critical reception ===
Although created to be a positive role-model and a strong female character for girls and boys, in the controversial Seduction of the Innocent, psychiatrist Fredric Wertham claimed, as a point of criticism, that Wonder Woman's strength and independence made her a lesbian.

Wonder Woman was named the 20th greatest comic book character by Empire film magazine. She was ranked sixth in Comics Buyer's Guide's "100 Sexiest Women in Comics" list. In May 2011, Wonder Woman placed fifth on IGN's Top 100 Comic Book Heroes of All Time.

Under current US copyright law, Wonder Woman is due to enter the public domain in between 2036 and 2037. (Note: See USC Title 17, Chapter 3, § 304(b)) However, this will only apply (at first) to the character as she is depicted in All Star Comics #8, which was published in 1941. Versions of her with later developments and some related characters, may persist under copyright until the works they were introduced in enter the public domain themselves.

==== Feminist icon ====
Feminist icon Gloria Steinem, founder of Ms. magazine, was responsible for the return of Wonder Woman's original abilities. Offended that the most famous female superhero had been depowered into a boyfriend-obsessed damsel in distress, Steinem placed Wonder Woman (in costume) on the cover of the first issue of Ms. (1972) – Warner Communications, DC Comics' owner, was an investor – which also contained an appreciative essay about the character. Wonder Woman's powers and traditional costume were restored in issue #204 (January–February 1973).

In 1972, just months before the groundbreaking US Supreme Court decision Roe v. Wade, science fiction author Samuel R. Delany had planned a story for Ms. that culminated in a plainclothes Wonder Woman protecting an abortion clinic. However, Steinem disapproved of Wonder Woman being out of costume, and the controversial story line never happened.

The original significance of Wonder Woman had the intentions of influencing many women of all ages, displaying the physical and mental strengths, values, and ethical attributes that not only men acquire. "Wonder Woman symbolizes many of the values of the women's culture that feminists are now trying to introduce into the mainstream: strength and self-reliance for women; sisterhood and mutual support among women; peacefulness and esteem for human life; a diminishment both of 'masculine' aggression and of the belief that violence is the only way of solving conflicts," Steinem wrote at the time.

Carolyn Cocca has stated that Wonder Woman possesses a "duality of character" due to the character possessing both feminine and masculine qualities in her physical abilities and attitude, which Cocca felt made her more appealing to a wide audience. Wonder Woman's first female editor, Karen Berger, claimed that, "Wonder Woman [is] a great role model to young women, but also contains many elements that appeal to males as well. Wonder Woman crosses the gender line.". Berger worked with George Pérez on the new issues of Wonder Woman starting in 1987, and the new Diana "works with friends and allies to teach lessons of peace and equality."

The origin of Wonder Woman and the psychological reasoning behind why William Morton Marston created her in the way he did illustrated Marston's educational, ethical, and moral values.

Marc DiPaolo introduces us to Wonder Woman's creator and history and he demonstrates how she is a "WWII veteran, a feminist icon, and a sex symbol" all throughout her "career". Wonder Woman stars in multiple films and is most commonly known for her red, white and blue one piece, and her tall, sexy assertiveness. What many people do not know is that she is a big part of history in the comic and superhero world because of how her character influences real life people of all ages, sexes, ethnicities, and races. "Marston created the comic book character Wonder Woman to be both strong and sexy, as a means of encouraging woman to emulate her unapologetic assertiveness." Charlotte Howell notes in her essay titled "'Tricky' Connotations: Wonder Woman as DC's Brand Disruptor" that Wonder Woman is "inherently disruptive to masculine superhero franchise branding because, according to her creator William Moulton Marston, she was intended to be 'psychological propaganda for the new type of woman who, [he] believe[d], should rule the world.'"

In 2015, Wonder Woman became the first superhero to officiate a same-sex wedding in a comic series.

On October 21, 2016, the 75th anniversary of the first appearance of the character, the United Nations named Wonder Woman a UN Honorary Ambassador for the Empowerment of Women and Girls in a ceremony attended by Wonder Woman actresses Gal Gadot and Lynda Carter, DC Entertainment President Diane Nelson, Wonder Woman feature film director Patty Jenkins, and U.N. Under-Secretary General Cristina Gallach appeared at the United Nations, to mark the character's designation by the United Nations as its "Honorary Ambassador for the Empowerment of Women and Girls". The gesture was intended to raise awareness of UN Sustainable Development Goal #5, which seeks to achieve gender equality and empower all women and girls by 2030. The decision was met with protests from UN staff members who stated in their petition to UN Secretary-General Ban Ki-moon that the character is "not culturally encompassing or sensitive" and served to objectify women. The petition also stated that it was "alarming that the United Nations would consider using a character with an overtly sexualized image". As a result, the character was stripped of the designation, and the project ended on December 16.

After the release of the 2017 film Wonder Woman, critics examined the character's status as a feminist figure in the film. Zoe Williams for The Guardian said, "Yes, she is sort of naked a lot of the time, but this isn't objectification so much as a cultural reset: having thighs, actual thighs you can kick things with, not thighs that look like arms, is a feminist act. The whole Diana myth, women safeguarding the world from male violence not with nurture but with better violence, is a feminist act. Casting Robin Wright as Wonder Woman's aunt, re-imagining the battle-axe as a battler with an axe, is a feminist act. A female German chemist trying to destroy humans (in the shape of Dr Poison, a proto-Mengele before Nazism existed) might be the most feminist act of all." Alyssa Rosenberg for The Washington Post said, "... None of these experiences crushed me, of course, but I do wonder what it might have been like if they hadn't happened. The power of Wonder Woman, and one of the things that gives Jenkins's adaptation of the character such a lift, is in the answer to that question. Diana Prince (Gal Gadot) doesn't have any idea what women and men are – or aren't – supposed to do. Even when she does encounter other people's ideas about gender roles, she doesn't automatically accept them, and she never lets anyone stop her. And the movie goes a step further and argues that it's not merely little girls all over the world who stand to gain if they can grow up free of the distorting influence of misogyny: a world like that would be liberating and wonderful for men in lots of ways, too." Emma Gray for HuffPost said, "When it comes to pop culture, we speak often about representation; the simple yet often unfulfilled idea that it matters to see someone like you fill a variety of imagined roles on screen. After a while, these conversations almost begin to feel obvious. We know that it's good to see women and people of color and disabled people and trans people and queer people in the same numbers and variety of roles that white, cisgender, straight men have long been afforded. But what these discussions often lose is the emotional impact of finally seeing something you may have never even realized you were missing. For many women viewers, "Wonder Woman" filled a hole they didn't know they had."

==== Pacifist icon ====
Gloria Steinem, editor for Ms. magazine and a major supporter of Wonder Woman, stated "... [Marston] had invented Wonder Woman as a heroine for little girls, and also as a conscious alternative to the violence of comic books for boys." Badower described a near-international incident (involving an unnamed Russian general rolling dozens of tanks and munitions through a shady mountain pass) as an outstanding example for standing up to bullies. "She ends up deflecting a bullet back and disarming the general," he says, adding that "she doesn't actually do anything violent in the story. I just think that Wonder Woman is smarter than that."

Nick Pumphrey stated that Wonder Woman stands as a non-violent beacon of hope and inspiration for women and men. Grant Morrison stated "I sat down and I thought, 'I don't want to do this warrior woman thing.' I can understand why they're doing it, I get all that, but that's not what [Wonder Woman creator] William Marston wanted, that's not what he wanted at all! His original concept for Wonder Woman was an answer to comics that he thought were filled with images of blood-curdling masculinity, and you see the latest shots of Gal Gadot in the costume, and it's all sword and shield and her snarling at the camera. Marston's Diana was a doctor, a healer, a scientist." The 2018 journal article "Casting a Wider Lasso: An Analysis of the Cultural Dismissal of Wonder Woman Through Her 1975–1979 Television Series" argued that the Lynda Carter show strongly adapted Wonder Woman's ideals but "was suppressed, undone, and discredited" by American culture as part of a larger legacy suppressing the character.

Paquette detailed the changes he made to Wonder Woman's costume, stating that he removed the iconic American flag theme and instead incorporated a Greek influence: "The animal associated to Aphrodite is a dove so instead of an eagle on [Wonder Woman's] breastplate, it will be more of a dove. It's not the American eagle, it's the Aphrodite dove. Stuff that creates [the letter] W is by accident, so it's not like she already has a letter of the alphabet on her [costume]. In the end I've created a structure so it feels inevitable for Wonder Woman to look the way she does."

==== LGBTQ icon ====
William Marston's earliest works were notorious for containing subversive "bondage and sapphic-undertones" subtext. Among Wonder Woman's famous catchphrases, "Suffering Sappho", was a direct reference to lesbianism. Fredric Wertham's Seduction of the Innocent referred to her as the "lesbian counterpart to Batman" (whom he also identified as a homosexual). After Marston's death in 1947, DC Comics downplayed her sexuality and feminist origin. Wonder Woman, without Marston's creative direction, become more "traditional" superhero fare; the lesbian relationships and sexual imagery disappeared from the "Wonder Woman" comic, along with Wonder Woman's super powers. During the Comics Code Authority-decades since, Wonder Woman's subversiveness had been gradually stripped away; subsequent comic book writers and artists either did not know what do with her or barely hinted at Wonder Woman's erotic legacy.

But under the new 1987 re-boot of the title, under the editorship of Karen Berger, and with the writing and art of George Perez at the helm of the book, the same-sex appreciation by Wonder Woman and the Amazons was more than hinted-at and this was established quickly in the new run of the title. Upon her first sight of supporting character Vanessa Kapatelis (in issue #3), she is shown smiling upwards at Kapatelis, thinking to herself "I've never seen another woman quite like her...she's so young...so vulnerable...so beautiful..." Three years later, in the first issue (#38) of a new decade, there is a story-line presenting a cultural exchange between appointed leaders from 'Man's World', who are the first mortals to visit Themyscira in this continuity, and the Amazons of Themyscira, in Themyscira, itself. The guest Unitarian minister, Reverend Cantwell, asks the Amazon Mnemosyne "..."Don't you miss the sharing God intended for the sexes?" to which Mnemosyne replied "Some do. They have sworn themselves to Artemis, the virgin hunter, and Athena, the chaste warrior. Others choose the way of Narcissus. But most of us find satisfaction in each other – three thousand years can be a long time, reverend.". Probably more than at any other time in the then nearly fifty-year history of the character, the Amazons were explicitly and unequivocally defined, in general, as lesbian. Additionally, Kevin Mayer, brother of the major supporting character Myndi Mayer, was openly gay and this was treated sympathetically. By this time, DC Comics was a Warner Brothers-owned company, and had been for over 20 years.

Wonder Woman is suggested as being queer or bisexual, as she and another Amazon, Io, had reciprocal feelings for each other. Grant Morrison's 2016 comic Wonder Woman: Earth One, which exists parallel to the current DC comics Rebirth canon, Diana is depicted being kissed on her right cheek by a blonde woman who has put her left arm around Diana.

In 2016, "Issue #48" of Sensation Comics, featured Wonder Woman officiating a same-sex wedding, drawn by Australian illustrator Jason Badower. "My country is all women. To us, it's not 'gay' marriage. It's just marriage", she states to Superman. Inspired by the 2015 June Supreme Court ruling that established same-sex marriage in all 50 United States, Badower says DC Comics was "fantastic" about his idea for the issue. In an interview with The Sydney Morning Herald, he said his editor "Was like 'great, I love it! Let's do it.' It was almost anticlimactic." "Diana's mother, the queen, at the very least authorized or in some cases officiated these weddings," Badower says. "It just seems more like a royal duty Diana would take on, that she would do for people that would appreciate it."

Wonder Woman actress Gal Gadot reacted positively to Diana's rebooted orientation, and agreed her sexuality was impacted by growing up in the women-only Themyscira. Gadot stated that Wonder Woman feels she need not be "labelled sexually", and is "just herself". "She's a woman who loves people for who they are. She can be bisexual. She loves people for their hearts." Coming from a society that was only populated by women, "'lesbian' in [the world's] eyes may have been 'straight' for them." "Her culture is completely free from the shackles of heteronormativity in the first place so she wouldn't even have any 'concept' of gender roles in sex."

Wonder Woman's advocacy for women rights and gay rights was taken a step further in September 2016, when comic book writer Greg Rucka announced that she is canonically bisexual, according to her rebooted "Rebirth" origin. Rucka stated, "... nobody at DC Comics has ever said, [Wonder Woman] gotta be straight. Nobody. Ever. They've never blinked at this." Rucka stated that in his opinion, she "has to be" queer and has "obviously" had same-sex relationships on an island surrounded by beautiful women. This follows the way Wonder Woman was written in the alternate continuity or non-canon Earth One by Grant Morrison, and fellow Wonder Woman writer Gail Simone staunchly supported Rucka's statement. Surprised at the amount of backlash from her fanbase, Rucka responded to "haters" that consensual sex with women is just as important to Wonder Woman as the Truth is to Superman.

In 2001, Tandi Iman Dupree had a famous drag performance preformed to "Holding Out for a Hero" at the Miss Gay Black America pageant dressed as Wonder Woman.

==== Sexual empowerment icon ====
Wonder Woman's signature weapon is her Lasso of Truth; consequently, much of her crime-fighting powers came from bondage, and her only exploitable weakness was, essentially, bondage. Grant Morrison and Yanick Paquette had teamed up to work on Wonder Woman: Earth One.

Wonder Woman's sexual and bondage themes in her earliest days were not without purpose, however. Her creator, William Moulton Marston, theorized that human relationships could be broken down into dominance, submission, inducement and compliance roles which were embedded into our psyche. Because males were, more often than not, dominant in societies, Marston believed that "Women as a sex, are many times better equipped to assume emotional leadership than are males." Marston wanted to convey his progressive ideals, through his use of bondage imagery, that women are not only capable of leadership roles, but should be in charge of society. Although Marston had good intentions with these themes, in Wonder Woman's early appearances, the bondage elements were controversial, as they were often seen to overly fetishize women in power rather than promote such women. Noah Berlatsky criticized this imagery in Wonder Woman's earliest days noting that "the comics take sensual pleasure in women's disempowerment." Despite having the mixed messages of this imagery, Marston fiercely believed that women would soon rule the earth and meant to showcase his predictions through sexual themes in his stories. He was an open feminist while studying at Harvard where he once said "Girls are also human beings, a point often overlooked!"

== In other media ==
Since her comic book debut in October 1941, Wonder Woman has appeared in a number of adaptations. These formats include films, television shows, and video games.

In the fine arts, and starting with the Pop art period and on a continuing basis since the 1960s, the character has been "appropriated" by multiple visual artists and incorporated into contemporary artwork, most notably by Andy Warhol, Roy Lichtenstein, Mel Ramos, Dulce Pinzon, Houben R.T. and others.

=== Television ===
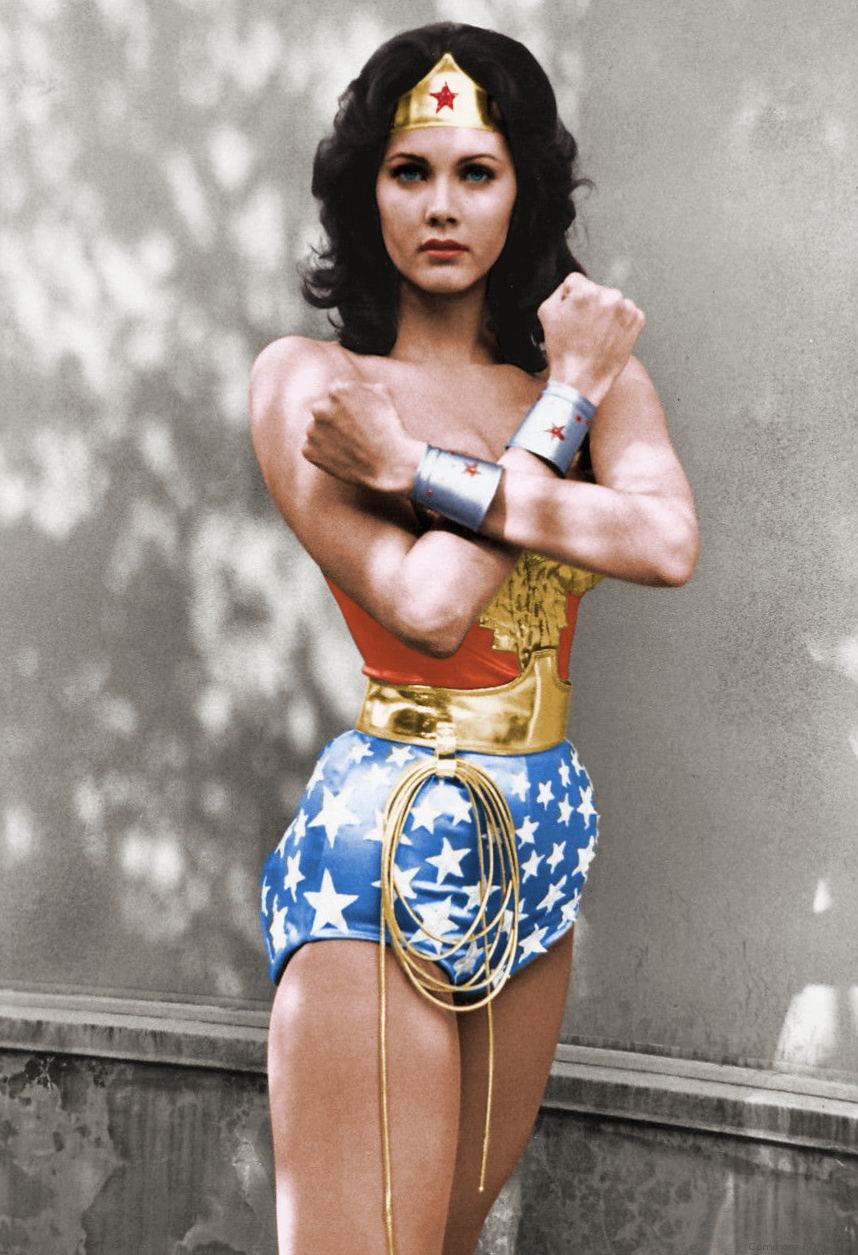
Promotional image of Lynda Carter as Wonder Woman for the television series Wonder Woman (1975–1979)

Wonder Woman has made various television appearances since the character's introduction. Live-action television appearances include the 1974 television film Wonder Woman starring Cathy Lee Crosby and the 1975–1979 television series Wonder Woman starring Lynda Carter as the character. A series pilot starring Adrianne Palicki was filmed in 2011 but ultimately went unaired. In the DC Extended Universe (DCEU) Peacemaker episode "It's Cow or Never", the series's first-season finale, Wonder Woman appears alongside other Justice League members as a silhouette, and was portrayed by a stand-in.

Wonder Woman also appeared in several animated television properties, such as in the Hanna-Barbera series Super Friends (1973–1986) alongside the Justice League members as well as the 2001–2004 Justice League series and its 2004–2006 follow-up, Justice League Unlimited. In the series DC Super Hero Girls (2019–2021), Wonder Woman is depicted as a teenage student at Metropolis High School, where she befriends several other characters.

=== Film ===
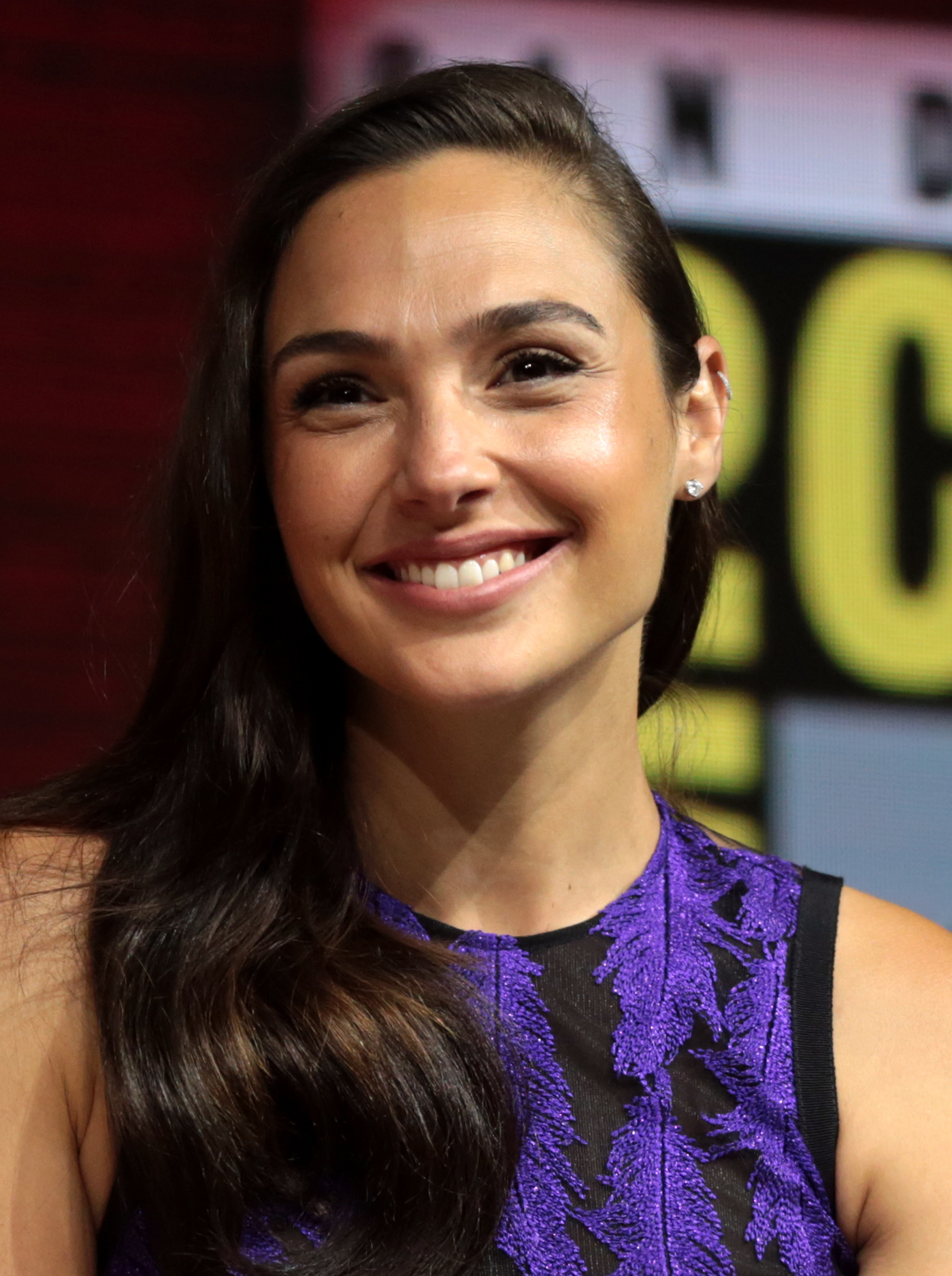
Gal Gadot at the San Diego Comic-Con panel for the film Wonder Woman 1984 in 2018

Wonder Woman has been featured in an abundance of direct-to-video animated films that are a part of the DC Animated Movie Universe (DCAMU) some of which include Justice League: The Flashpoint Paradox (2013), Justice League: Throne of Atlantis (2015) and Justice League Dark: Apokolips War (2020). There are also other direct-to-video films the character appears in that are not a part of the DCAMU including Injustice (2021), Justice League: Gods and Monsters (2015), and Justice League: The New Frontier (2008), along with a few CGI theatrical releases such as The Lego Movie (2014) and The Lego Batman Movie (2017).

Within the live-action DC Extended Universe (DCEU) films, Wonder Woman debuted in Batman v Superman: Dawn of Justice (2016), portrayed by Gal Gadot, and reappeared in Wonder Woman (2017) and its sequel Wonder Woman 1984 (2020), as well as Justice League (2017) and its director's cut (2021), and had cameo appearances in Shazam! Fury of the Gods and The Flash (both 2023).

A new version of the character will appear in the DC Universe (DCU). Her movie has been fast-tracked as of July 2025. She is expected to make her first apperence in Man of Tomorrow (2027). However, following a change in leadership at DC Studios, she is reportedly expected to be cut from the film during upcoming reshoots and recast.

The 2017 film Professor Marston and the Wonder Women tells the story of the polyamorous relationship between William Moulton Marston, his wife and fellow psychologist Elizabeth Holloway Marston, and their lover Olive Byrne, the invention of the lie detector test, and how they inspired the creation of the Wonder Woman comic.

=== Video games ===
The character of Wonder Woman has appeared in a plethora of different videos games, both DC orchestrated and not. Most games that she appears in are fighting based and include Diana as a playable character, while in others she is an NPC. Below one can find may of the aforementioned games that she is included in.

- Justice League Task Force (1995), based on the Justice League animated series as a playable character.
- Justice League: Injustice for All (2002), based on the Justice League animated series as a playable character.
- Justice League: Chronicles (2003), based on the Justice League animated series as a playable character.
- Justice League Heroes (2006), as a playable character ― voiced by Courtenay Taylor.
- Justice League Heroes: The Flash (2006), as an NPC.
- Mortal Kombat vs. DC Universe (2008), as a playable character — voiced by Tara Platt.
- DC Universe Online (2011), as a playable character (Legends PVP mode only) and an NPC — originally voiced by Gina Torres, currently voiced by Susan Eisenberg.
- LittleBigPlanet 2 (2011), as an NPC — voiced by Jules de Jongh.
- Scribblenauts Unmasked (2012), as an NPC.
- Infinite Crisis (2015), as a playable character — voiced by Vanessa Marshall.
- Arena of Valor (2016), as a playable character.
- Fortnite (2017), as a cosmetic outfit.
- DC Unchained (2018), as a playable character.
- DC Super Hero Girls: Teen Power (2021), as a playable character — voiced by Grey DeLisle-Griffin
- MultiVersus (2022), as a playable character — voiced by Abby Trott.
- Justice League: Cosmic Chaos (2023), as a playable character — voiced by Vanessa Marshall.
- Suicide Squad: Kill the Justice League (2024), as an NPC.
- An untitled single-player open world action game starring Wonder Woman was in development at Monolith. However, in February 2025, it was announced the game was cancelled following the closure of Monolith.

==== Lego ====
- Lego Batman 2: DC Super Heroes (2012), as a playable character — voiced by Laura Bailey.
- Lego Batman 3: Beyond Gotham (2014), as a playable character — voiced by Laura Bailey reprising her role. If the player chooses to activate her flying ability, the theme song from the Wonder Woman television series will play until she lands.
- Lego Dimensions (2015), as a playable character — voiced by Laura Bailey.
- Lego DC Super-Villains (2018), as a playable character — with Susan Eisenberg reprising her role from the Justice League animated series.
- The Lego Movie 2 Videogame (2019), as a playable character — voiced by Danielle Bisutti.

==== Injustice ====
- Injustice: Gods Among Us (2013), as a playable character — voiced by Susan Eisenberg. The storyline sees Wonder Woman travelling to an alternate reality with the rest of the Justice League where they must defeat most of their evil counterparts. Wonder Woman's counterpart supports the tyrannical Superman's regime and is in a relationship with him (though it is evidently one-sided, as he still loves his deceased wife Lois). In the game, she has alternate costumes based on her appearances in Flashpoint, Red Son, the New 52, Ame-Comi girls, and issue #600 of the Wonder Woman comics.
- Injustice 2 (2017), as a playable character — voiced again by Susan Eisenberg. This version is still allied with the Regime and Superman, and tries to convince Supergirl (who assisted her in breaking out of prison) to join their cause, but fails after Supergirl learns that the Regime shows no mercy towards criminals. In her single player ending, Wonder Woman takes Brainiac's head, gaining the public favor needed to restore the Regime to power. She plans to make Batman and his comrades pay for toppling the Regime, then take her revenge on the Themyscirans for betraying her. An alternate version of her Flashpoint counterpart appears in Green Arrow's ending as a member of the Multiverse Justice League. She has a gear set in the game based on the 2017 Wonder Woman film.

== See also ==
- Amazons (DC Comics)
- Darna
- List of Wonder Woman characters
- List of Wonder Woman enemies
- List of Wonder Woman supporting characters
- Orana (comics)
- Woman warrior
- Wonder Woman in literature
- List of Wonder Woman comics
