= Elizabeth Holloway Marston =

American attorney psychologist (1893–1993)

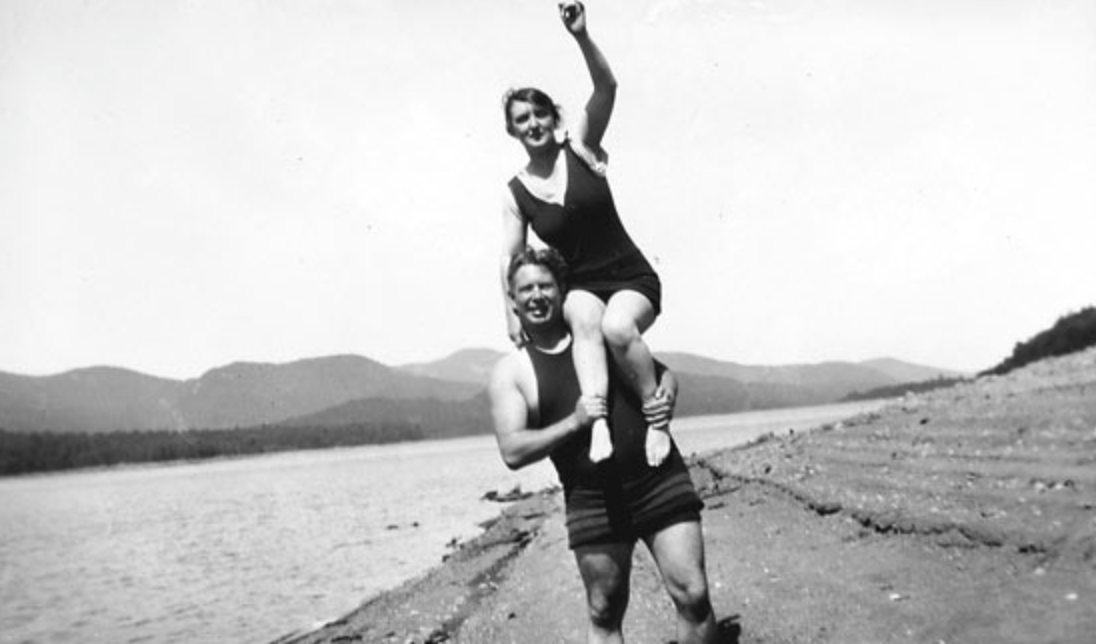
- Born: Sarah Elizabeth Holloway; February 20, 1893; Sulby, Isle of Man
- Died: March 27, 1993 (aged 100); Bethel, Connecticut, U.S.
- Other name: Sadie Holloway
- Education: Mount Holyoke College (BA); Boston University (LLB); Harvard University (MA)
- Occupations: Editor, author, lecturer
- Known for: Creation of Wonder Woman; Systolic blood-pressure test
- Spouse: William Moulton Marston (m. 1915; died 1947)
- Partner: Olive Byrne
- Children: 2

Sarah Elizabeth Marston (née Holloway; February 20, 1893 – March 27, 1993) was an American attorney and psychologist. She is credited, with her husband William Moulton Marston, with the development of the systolic blood pressure measurement used to detect deception, the predecessor to the polygraph.

She is also credited as an inspiration for her husband's comic book creation Wonder Woman, along with their polyamorous life partner, Olive Byrne.

== Early life ==
Marston was born Sarah Elizabeth Holloway in Sulby, Isle of Man to William George Washington Holloway (died February 13, 1961), an American bank clerk, and his English wife, Daisy (née De Gaunza; died July 19, 1945), who had married in England in 1892. After her family moved to the United States, Sarah was raised in Boston, Massachusetts. Her nickname was "Sadie". She eventually discarded her forename in favor of her middle name, Elizabeth, by which she would become known.

== Career and family ==
Marston received her BA in psychology from Mount Holyoke College in 1915 and her LLB from the Boston University School of Law in 1918, one of just three female graduates of the School of Law that year.

Marston married William Moulton Marston in 1915. She first gave birth at age 35, then returned to work. During her long and productive career, she indexed the documents of the first fourteen Congresses, lectured on law, ethics and psychology at several American universities, and served as an editor for Encyclopædia Britannica and McCall's. She cowrote a textbook, Integrative Psychology, with her husband and C. Daly King. In 1933, she became the assistant to the chief executive at Metropolitan Life Insurance.

Sometime in the late 1920s, Olive Byrne, a young woman William had met while teaching at Tufts University, joined the household, becoming the third partner in their relationship. Elizabeth Marston had two children, Peter and Olive Ann, while Olive Byrne also gave birth to two of William's children, Byrne and Donn. The Marstons legally adopted Olive's boys, and Olive remained a part of the family, even after William's death in 1947.

Olive stayed home with the children while Marston worked. Continuing at MetLife until she was sixty-five, Elizabeth sponsored all four children through college, Donn through law school, and Byrne's postgraduate psychology studies as well. She and Olive continued living together until Olive's death in 1990. Both Olive and Marston "embodied the feminism of the day."

=== Systolic blood-pressure test ===
Marston enrolled in the master's degree program at Radcliffe College of Harvard University while her husband William attended the doctoral program in psychology at Harvard, which at that time enrolled only male students. She worked with William on his thesis, which concerned the correlation between blood pressure levels and deception. He later developed this into the systolic blood-pressure test used to detect deception that was the predecessor to the polygraph test.

In 1921, Marston received her MA from Radcliffe and William received his PhD from Harvard. Although Marston is not listed as William's collaborator in his early work, a number of writers refer directly and indirectly to Elizabeth's work on her husband's blood pressure/deception research. She appears in a picture taken in his polygraph laboratory in the 1920s, reproduced in a 1938 publication by William.

=== Wonder Woman ===
A 1992 "Our Towns" feature of The New York Times discussed Marston's involvement in the creation of Wonder Woman (although no source is cited in the article for the declaration "this super-hero had better be a woman" that was attributed to Holloway):

Our Towns reveals the true identity of Wonder Woman's real Mom. She is Elizabeth Holloway Marston. She's 99 come Thursday [...] One dark night as the clouds of war hovered over Europe again, Mr. Marston consulted his wife and collaborator, also a psychologist. He was inventing somebody like that new Superman fellow, only his character would promote a global psychic revolution by forsaking Biff! Bam! and Ka-Runch! for The Power of Love. Well, said Mrs. Marston, who was born liberated, this super-hero had better be a woman [...] Wonder Woman was created and written in the Marstons' suburban study as a crusading Boston career woman disguised as Diana Prince [...] Meanwhile, in a small Connecticut town, Wonder Woman's Mom has disguised herself as a retired editor who lives in postwar housing.

Her obituary also stated that she contributed to the development of Wonder Woman, while Lillian S. Robinson argued that both Olive Byrne and Elizabeth were models for the character.

== Death ==
Marston died on March 27, 1993, one month and one week after her 100th birthday.

== In film ==
Marston's life is depicted in Professor Marston and the Wonder Women, a 2017 fictional biographical drama that also portrays her husband William, Olive Byrne, and the creation of Wonder Woman. Marston is portrayed in the film by British actress Rebecca Hall.

== Asteroid ==
Asteroid 101813 Elizabethmarston was named in her memory. The official naming citation was published by the Minor Planet Center on September 25, 2018 (M.P.C. 111800) along with the naming of Asteroid 102234 Olivebyrne.

== Works ==
- Integrative Psychology: A Study of Unit Response by William Moulton Marston, C. Daly King, and Elizabeth Holloway Marston, 1931.
- "Chalk Marks on the Gate", by Elizabeth Holloway; illus. Adolf Treidler; Woman's Home Companion, 1924, January; pp 14–15, 96.
- "Gift-Horse", by Elizabeth Holloway; illus. George Wright; Woman's Home Companion, 1922, July; pp 22–23, 92–93.
