= List of minor planets: 102001–103000 =

The following is a partial list of minor planets, running from minor-planet number 102001 through 103000, inclusive. The primary data for this and other partial lists is based on JPL's "Small-Body Orbital Elements" and data available from the Minor Planet Center. Critical list information is also provided by the MPC, unless otherwise specified from Lowell Observatory. A detailed description of the table's columns and additional sources are given on the main page including a complete list of every page in this series, and a statistical break-up on the dynamical classification of minor planets.

Also see the summary list of all named bodies in numerical and alphabetical order, and the corresponding naming citations for the number range of this particular list. New namings may only be added to this list after official publication, as the preannouncement of names is condemned by the Working Group for Small Bodies Nomenclature of the International Astronomical Union.

| Near-Earth obj. | MBA (inner) | MBA (outer) | Centaur |
| Mars-crosser | MBA (middle) | Jupiter trojan | Trans-Neptunian obj. |
| Unclassified |

== 102001–102100 ==
| Designation | | | Discovery | | | Properties | | Ref |
| Permanent | Provisional | Named after | Date | Site | Discoverer(s) | Category | Diam. | Ref |
|---|---|---|---|---|---|---|---|---|
| 102001 | 1999 RG_{79} | — | September 7, 1999 | Socorro | LINEAR | · | 4.8 km | MPC · JPL |
| 102002 | 1999 RR_{80} | — | September 7, 1999 | Socorro | LINEAR | · | 2.2 km | MPC · JPL |
| 102003 | 1999 RX_{80} | — | September 7, 1999 | Socorro | LINEAR | V | 1.5 km | MPC · JPL |
| 102004 | 1999 RC_{81} | — | September 7, 1999 | Socorro | LINEAR | · | 3.0 km | MPC · JPL |
| 102005 | 1999 RS_{81} | — | September 7, 1999 | Socorro | LINEAR | · | 1.6 km | MPC · JPL |
| 102006 | 1999 RA_{82} | — | September 7, 1999 | Socorro | LINEAR | · | 1.4 km | MPC · JPL |
| 102007 | 1999 RB_{82} | — | September 7, 1999 | Socorro | LINEAR | · | 1.9 km | MPC · JPL |
| 102008 | 1999 RD_{82} | — | September 7, 1999 | Socorro | LINEAR | (5) | 1.9 km | MPC · JPL |
| 102009 | 1999 RF_{82} | — | September 7, 1999 | Socorro | LINEAR | · | 5.1 km | MPC · JPL |
| 102010 | 1999 RE_{84} | — | September 7, 1999 | Socorro | LINEAR | · | 2.1 km | MPC · JPL |
| 102011 | 1999 RR_{84} | — | September 7, 1999 | Socorro | LINEAR | · | 1.9 km | MPC · JPL |
| 102012 | 1999 RV_{85} | — | September 7, 1999 | Socorro | LINEAR | · | 1.7 km | MPC · JPL |
| 102013 | 1999 RX_{85} | — | September 7, 1999 | Socorro | LINEAR | · | 1.7 km | MPC · JPL |
| 102014 | 1999 RH_{86} | — | September 7, 1999 | Socorro | LINEAR | V | 1.2 km | MPC · JPL |
| 102015 | 1999 RK_{87} | — | September 7, 1999 | Socorro | LINEAR | · | 1.1 km | MPC · JPL |
| 102016 | 1999 RY_{87} | — | September 7, 1999 | Socorro | LINEAR | · | 1.6 km | MPC · JPL |
| 102017 | 1999 RD_{89} | — | September 7, 1999 | Socorro | LINEAR | · | 1.5 km | MPC · JPL |
| 102018 | 1999 RD_{90} | — | September 7, 1999 | Socorro | LINEAR | HYG | 5.7 km | MPC · JPL |
| 102019 | 1999 RH_{90} | — | September 7, 1999 | Socorro | LINEAR | · | 2.3 km | MPC · JPL |
| 102020 | 1999 RK_{90} | — | September 7, 1999 | Socorro | LINEAR | · | 3.1 km | MPC · JPL |
| 102021 | 1999 RV_{92} | — | September 7, 1999 | Socorro | LINEAR | · | 3.1 km | MPC · JPL |
| 102022 | 1999 RX_{92} | — | September 7, 1999 | Socorro | LINEAR | SUL | 5.3 km | MPC · JPL |
| 102023 | 1999 RA_{93} | — | September 7, 1999 | Socorro | LINEAR | · | 2.2 km | MPC · JPL |
| 102024 | 1999 RY_{94} | — | September 7, 1999 | Socorro | LINEAR | · | 1.4 km | MPC · JPL |
| 102025 | 1999 RC_{97} | — | September 7, 1999 | Socorro | LINEAR | V | 1 km | MPC · JPL |
| 102026 | 1999 RF_{97} | — | September 7, 1999 | Socorro | LINEAR | MAS | 1.4 km | MPC · JPL |
| 102027 | 1999 RC_{98} | — | September 7, 1999 | Socorro | LINEAR | · | 3.3 km | MPC · JPL |
| 102028 | 1999 RL_{98} | — | September 7, 1999 | Socorro | LINEAR | MAS | 1.2 km | MPC · JPL |
| 102029 | 1999 RV_{99} | — | September 8, 1999 | Socorro | LINEAR | · | 1.5 km | MPC · JPL |
| 102030 | 1999 RJ_{100} | — | September 8, 1999 | Socorro | LINEAR | · | 1.6 km | MPC · JPL |
| 102031 | 1999 RC_{105} | — | September 8, 1999 | Socorro | LINEAR | · | 1.8 km | MPC · JPL |
| 102032 | 1999 RC_{106} | — | September 8, 1999 | Socorro | LINEAR | · | 2.3 km | MPC · JPL |
| 102033 | 1999 RU_{107} | — | September 8, 1999 | Socorro | LINEAR | · | 8.5 km | MPC · JPL |
| 102034 | 1999 RW_{107} | — | September 8, 1999 | Socorro | LINEAR | CYB | 8.2 km | MPC · JPL |
| 102035 | 1999 RG_{108} | — | September 8, 1999 | Socorro | LINEAR | EOS | 3.4 km | MPC · JPL |
| 102036 | 1999 RT_{108} | — | September 8, 1999 | Socorro | LINEAR | · | 1.5 km | MPC · JPL |
| 102037 | 1999 RU_{108} | — | September 8, 1999 | Socorro | LINEAR | (2076) | 1.8 km | MPC · JPL |
| 102038 | 1999 RU_{109} | — | September 8, 1999 | Socorro | LINEAR | V | 1.3 km | MPC · JPL |
| 102039 | 1999 RT_{110} | — | September 8, 1999 | Socorro | LINEAR | · | 4.4 km | MPC · JPL |
| 102040 | 1999 RG_{112} | — | September 9, 1999 | Socorro | LINEAR | · | 9.6 km | MPC · JPL |
| 102041 | 1999 RT_{112} | — | September 9, 1999 | Socorro | LINEAR | · | 1.5 km | MPC · JPL |
| 102042 | 1999 RB_{114} | — | September 9, 1999 | Socorro | LINEAR | · | 1.8 km | MPC · JPL |
| 102043 | 1999 RU_{114} | — | September 9, 1999 | Socorro | LINEAR | · | 1.6 km | MPC · JPL |
| 102044 | 1999 RH_{115} | — | September 9, 1999 | Socorro | LINEAR | · | 1.6 km | MPC · JPL |
| 102045 | 1999 RQ_{115} | — | September 9, 1999 | Socorro | LINEAR | TIR | 3.4 km | MPC · JPL |
| 102046 | 1999 RG_{118} | — | September 9, 1999 | Socorro | LINEAR | · | 1.5 km | MPC · JPL |
| 102047 | 1999 RO_{120} | — | September 9, 1999 | Socorro | LINEAR | · | 4.1 km | MPC · JPL |
| 102048 | 1999 RJ_{121} | — | September 13, 1999 | Kitt Peak | Spacewatch | · | 2.0 km | MPC · JPL |
| 102049 | 1999 RM_{121} | — | September 9, 1999 | Socorro | LINEAR | · | 5.2 km | MPC · JPL |
| 102050 | 1999 RP_{122} | — | September 9, 1999 | Socorro | LINEAR | · | 2.6 km | MPC · JPL |
| 102051 | 1999 RR_{122} | — | September 9, 1999 | Socorro | LINEAR | · | 2.7 km | MPC · JPL |
| 102052 | 1999 RA_{125} | — | September 9, 1999 | Socorro | LINEAR | THM | 4.6 km | MPC · JPL |
| 102053 | 1999 RB_{125} | — | September 9, 1999 | Socorro | LINEAR | · | 1.9 km | MPC · JPL |
| 102054 | 1999 RC_{125} | — | September 9, 1999 | Socorro | LINEAR | · | 7.2 km | MPC · JPL |
| 102055 | 1999 RH_{126} | — | September 9, 1999 | Socorro | LINEAR | · | 2.9 km | MPC · JPL |
| 102056 | 1999 RM_{126} | — | September 9, 1999 | Socorro | LINEAR | · | 2.5 km | MPC · JPL |
| 102057 | 1999 RL_{129} | — | September 9, 1999 | Socorro | LINEAR | · | 1.7 km | MPC · JPL |
| 102058 | 1999 RT_{129} | — | September 9, 1999 | Socorro | LINEAR | · | 3.8 km | MPC · JPL |
| 102059 | 1999 RM_{131} | — | September 9, 1999 | Socorro | LINEAR | · | 1.4 km | MPC · JPL |
| 102060 | 1999 RZ_{131} | — | September 9, 1999 | Socorro | LINEAR | · | 1.7 km | MPC · JPL |
| 102061 | 1999 RC_{132} | — | September 9, 1999 | Socorro | LINEAR | · | 2.7 km | MPC · JPL |
| 102062 | 1999 RN_{132} | — | September 9, 1999 | Socorro | LINEAR | · | 8.8 km | MPC · JPL |
| 102063 | 1999 RR_{134} | — | September 9, 1999 | Socorro | LINEAR | · | 7.9 km | MPC · JPL |
| 102064 | 1999 RW_{134} | — | September 9, 1999 | Socorro | LINEAR | · | 5.4 km | MPC · JPL |
| 102065 | 1999 RC_{136} | — | September 9, 1999 | Socorro | LINEAR | NYS | 2.3 km | MPC · JPL |
| 102066 | 1999 RV_{137} | — | September 9, 1999 | Socorro | LINEAR | · | 1.7 km | MPC · JPL |
| 102067 | 1999 RF_{138} | — | September 9, 1999 | Socorro | LINEAR | · | 2.3 km | MPC · JPL |
| 102068 | 1999 RC_{139} | — | September 9, 1999 | Socorro | LINEAR | (2076) | 1.9 km | MPC · JPL |
| 102069 | 1999 RF_{139} | — | September 9, 1999 | Socorro | LINEAR | NYS | 1.8 km | MPC · JPL |
| 102070 | 1999 RH_{139} | — | September 9, 1999 | Socorro | LINEAR | NYS | 1.2 km | MPC · JPL |
| 102071 | 1999 RK_{139} | — | September 9, 1999 | Socorro | LINEAR | · | 1.6 km | MPC · JPL |
| 102072 | 1999 RE_{140} | — | September 9, 1999 | Socorro | LINEAR | · | 8.9 km | MPC · JPL |
| 102073 | 1999 RT_{140} | — | September 9, 1999 | Socorro | LINEAR | · | 1.7 km | MPC · JPL |
| 102074 | 1999 RN_{143} | — | September 9, 1999 | Socorro | LINEAR | · | 3.0 km | MPC · JPL |
| 102075 | 1999 RC_{144} | — | September 9, 1999 | Socorro | LINEAR | V | 1.4 km | MPC · JPL |
| 102076 | 1999 RL_{144} | — | September 9, 1999 | Socorro | LINEAR | (2076) | 1.7 km | MPC · JPL |
| 102077 | 1999 RL_{146} | — | September 9, 1999 | Socorro | LINEAR | · | 1.3 km | MPC · JPL |
| 102078 | 1999 RS_{147} | — | September 9, 1999 | Socorro | LINEAR | · | 7.1 km | MPC · JPL |
| 102079 | 1999 RV_{147} | — | September 9, 1999 | Socorro | LINEAR | fast | 1.9 km | MPC · JPL |
| 102080 | 1999 RP_{148} | — | September 9, 1999 | Socorro | LINEAR | · | 2.6 km | MPC · JPL |
| 102081 | 1999 RB_{149} | — | September 9, 1999 | Socorro | LINEAR | · | 2.5 km | MPC · JPL |
| 102082 | 1999 RK_{149} | — | September 9, 1999 | Socorro | LINEAR | · | 6.4 km | MPC · JPL |
| 102083 | 1999 RO_{149} | — | September 9, 1999 | Socorro | LINEAR | · | 2.4 km | MPC · JPL |
| 102084 | 1999 RF_{150} | — | September 9, 1999 | Socorro | LINEAR | HYG | 5.2 km | MPC · JPL |
| 102085 | 1999 RK_{150} | — | September 9, 1999 | Socorro | LINEAR | · | 7.4 km | MPC · JPL |
| 102086 | 1999 RT_{150} | — | September 9, 1999 | Socorro | LINEAR | · | 2.6 km | MPC · JPL |
| 102087 | 1999 RT_{151} | — | September 9, 1999 | Socorro | LINEAR | · | 3.2 km | MPC · JPL |
| 102088 | 1999 RA_{152} | — | September 9, 1999 | Socorro | LINEAR | · | 1.6 km | MPC · JPL |
| 102089 | 1999 RK_{152} | — | September 9, 1999 | Socorro | LINEAR | · | 3.2 km | MPC · JPL |
| 102090 | 1999 RP_{153} | — | September 9, 1999 | Socorro | LINEAR | · | 2.4 km | MPC · JPL |
| 102091 | 1999 RL_{154} | — | September 9, 1999 | Socorro | LINEAR | NYS | 1.7 km | MPC · JPL |
| 102092 | 1999 RD_{155} | — | September 9, 1999 | Socorro | LINEAR | · | 6.2 km | MPC · JPL |
| 102093 | 1999 RH_{155} | — | September 9, 1999 | Socorro | LINEAR | · | 7.4 km | MPC · JPL |
| 102094 | 1999 RH_{156} | — | September 9, 1999 | Socorro | LINEAR | HYG | 6.3 km | MPC · JPL |
| 102095 | 1999 RK_{156} | — | September 9, 1999 | Socorro | LINEAR | · | 3.7 km | MPC · JPL |
| 102096 | 1999 RX_{156} | — | September 9, 1999 | Socorro | LINEAR | NYS | 1.6 km | MPC · JPL |
| 102097 | 1999 RZ_{157} | — | September 9, 1999 | Socorro | LINEAR | · | 2.3 km | MPC · JPL |
| 102098 | 1999 RJ_{158} | — | September 9, 1999 | Socorro | LINEAR | NYS | 2.2 km | MPC · JPL |
| 102099 | 1999 RW_{158} | — | September 9, 1999 | Socorro | LINEAR | MAS | 1.4 km | MPC · JPL |
| 102100 | 1999 RG_{159} | — | September 9, 1999 | Socorro | LINEAR | · | 2.4 km | MPC · JPL |

== 102101–102200 ==
back to top

| Designation | | | Discovery | | | Properties | | Ref |
| Permanent | Provisional | Named after | Date | Site | Discoverer(s) | Category | Diam. | Ref |
|---|---|---|---|---|---|---|---|---|
| 102101 | 1999 RZ_{159} | — | September 9, 1999 | Socorro | LINEAR | · | 2.0 km | MPC · JPL |
| 102102 | 1999 RK_{160} | — | September 9, 1999 | Socorro | LINEAR | · | 1.5 km | MPC · JPL |
| 102103 | 1999 RA_{161} | — | September 9, 1999 | Socorro | LINEAR | V | 1.1 km | MPC · JPL |
| 102104 | 1999 RV_{161} | — | September 9, 1999 | Socorro | LINEAR | NYS | 1.7 km | MPC · JPL |
| 102105 | 1999 RA_{163} | — | September 9, 1999 | Socorro | LINEAR | · | 7.1 km | MPC · JPL |
| 102106 | 1999 RB_{163} | — | September 9, 1999 | Socorro | LINEAR | · | 2.3 km | MPC · JPL |
| 102107 | 1999 RL_{164} | — | September 9, 1999 | Socorro | LINEAR | · | 3.1 km | MPC · JPL |
| 102108 | 1999 RZ_{165} | — | September 9, 1999 | Socorro | LINEAR | MAS | 2.3 km | MPC · JPL |
| 102109 | 1999 RD_{166} | — | September 9, 1999 | Socorro | LINEAR | · | 1.2 km | MPC · JPL |
| 102110 | 1999 RV_{166} | — | September 9, 1999 | Socorro | LINEAR | · | 7.4 km | MPC · JPL |
| 102111 | 1999 RQ_{167} | — | September 9, 1999 | Socorro | LINEAR | · | 2.3 km | MPC · JPL |
| 102112 | 1999 RR_{167} | — | September 9, 1999 | Socorro | LINEAR | · | 1.4 km | MPC · JPL |
| 102113 | 1999 RZ_{167} | — | September 9, 1999 | Socorro | LINEAR | · | 2.6 km | MPC · JPL |
| 102114 | 1999 RW_{168} | — | September 9, 1999 | Socorro | LINEAR | · | 9.0 km | MPC · JPL |
| 102115 | 1999 RZ_{168} | — | September 9, 1999 | Socorro | LINEAR | · | 2.3 km | MPC · JPL |
| 102116 | 1999 RM_{170} | — | September 9, 1999 | Socorro | LINEAR | NYS | 2.2 km | MPC · JPL |
| 102117 | 1999 RW_{170} | — | September 9, 1999 | Socorro | LINEAR | · | 1.9 km | MPC · JPL |
| 102118 | 1999 RX_{170} | — | September 9, 1999 | Socorro | LINEAR | PHO | 1.7 km | MPC · JPL |
| 102119 | 1999 RO_{171} | — | September 9, 1999 | Socorro | LINEAR | · | 2.2 km | MPC · JPL |
| 102120 | 1999 RO_{172} | — | September 9, 1999 | Socorro | LINEAR | · | 6.2 km | MPC · JPL |
| 102121 | 1999 RL_{174} | — | September 9, 1999 | Socorro | LINEAR | MAS | 1.3 km | MPC · JPL |
| 102122 | 1999 RG_{175} | — | September 9, 1999 | Socorro | LINEAR | · | 2.5 km | MPC · JPL |
| 102123 | 1999 RP_{175} | — | September 9, 1999 | Socorro | LINEAR | · | 7.0 km | MPC · JPL |
| 102124 | 1999 RB_{177} | — | September 9, 1999 | Socorro | LINEAR | · | 1.9 km | MPC · JPL |
| 102125 | 1999 RQ_{177} | — | September 9, 1999 | Socorro | LINEAR | · | 1.3 km | MPC · JPL |
| 102126 | 1999 RW_{177} | — | September 9, 1999 | Socorro | LINEAR | · | 1.5 km | MPC · JPL |
| 102127 | 1999 RY_{177} | — | September 9, 1999 | Socorro | LINEAR | · | 1.5 km | MPC · JPL |
| 102128 | 1999 RC_{178} | — | September 9, 1999 | Socorro | LINEAR | · | 1.9 km | MPC · JPL |
| 102129 | 1999 RM_{179} | — | September 9, 1999 | Socorro | LINEAR | · | 2.0 km | MPC · JPL |
| 102130 | 1999 RT_{179} | — | September 9, 1999 | Socorro | LINEAR | · | 2.4 km | MPC · JPL |
| 102131 | 1999 RX_{179} | — | September 9, 1999 | Socorro | LINEAR | · | 1.6 km | MPC · JPL |
| 102132 | 1999 RH_{180} | — | September 9, 1999 | Socorro | LINEAR | · | 2.9 km | MPC · JPL |
| 102133 | 1999 RB_{181} | — | September 9, 1999 | Socorro | LINEAR | · | 1.4 km | MPC · JPL |
| 102134 | 1999 RD_{181} | — | September 9, 1999 | Socorro | LINEAR | MAS | 1.4 km | MPC · JPL |
| 102135 | 1999 RN_{182} | — | September 9, 1999 | Socorro | LINEAR | NYS | 1.9 km | MPC · JPL |
| 102136 | 1999 RO_{182} | — | September 9, 1999 | Socorro | LINEAR | V | 1.7 km | MPC · JPL |
| 102137 | 1999 RR_{182} | — | September 9, 1999 | Socorro | LINEAR | · | 1.6 km | MPC · JPL |
| 102138 | 1999 RS_{182} | — | September 9, 1999 | Socorro | LINEAR | NYS | 2.6 km | MPC · JPL |
| 102139 | 1999 RO_{183} | — | September 9, 1999 | Socorro | LINEAR | V | 1.4 km | MPC · JPL |
| 102140 | 1999 RS_{184} | — | September 9, 1999 | Socorro | LINEAR | · | 2.4 km | MPC · JPL |
| 102141 | 1999 RT_{184} | — | September 9, 1999 | Socorro | LINEAR | · | 2.6 km | MPC · JPL |
| 102142 | 1999 RB_{185} | — | September 9, 1999 | Socorro | LINEAR | (5) | 2.1 km | MPC · JPL |
| 102143 | 1999 RC_{186} | — | September 9, 1999 | Socorro | LINEAR | MAS | 1.4 km | MPC · JPL |
| 102144 | 1999 RA_{188} | — | September 9, 1999 | Socorro | LINEAR | · | 2.6 km | MPC · JPL |
| 102145 | 1999 RQ_{188} | — | September 9, 1999 | Socorro | LINEAR | · | 1.9 km | MPC · JPL |
| 102146 | 1999 RW_{191} | — | September 11, 1999 | Socorro | LINEAR | (5) | 2.0 km | MPC · JPL |
| 102147 | 1999 RC_{192} | — | September 13, 1999 | Socorro | LINEAR | · | 2.0 km | MPC · JPL |
| 102148 | 1999 RA_{195} | — | September 8, 1999 | Socorro | LINEAR | PHO | 3.5 km | MPC · JPL |
| 102149 | 1999 RH_{197} | — | September 8, 1999 | Socorro | LINEAR | · | 1.8 km | MPC · JPL |
| 102150 | 1999 RQ_{197} | — | September 8, 1999 | Socorro | LINEAR | EUP | 11 km | MPC · JPL |
| 102151 | 1999 RA_{198} | — | September 8, 1999 | Socorro | LINEAR | · | 1.6 km | MPC · JPL |
| 102152 | 1999 RL_{201} | — | September 8, 1999 | Socorro | LINEAR | · | 8.2 km | MPC · JPL |
| 102153 | 1999 RM_{201} | — | September 8, 1999 | Socorro | LINEAR | · | 1.6 km | MPC · JPL |
| 102154 | 1999 RK_{203} | — | September 8, 1999 | Socorro | LINEAR | PHO | 2.9 km | MPC · JPL |
| 102155 | 1999 RV_{203} | — | September 8, 1999 | Socorro | LINEAR | · | 2.3 km | MPC · JPL |
| 102156 | 1999 RV_{204} | — | September 8, 1999 | Socorro | LINEAR | · | 6.2 km | MPC · JPL |
| 102157 | 1999 RV_{206} | — | September 8, 1999 | Socorro | LINEAR | · | 4.5 km | MPC · JPL |
| 102158 | 1999 RC_{209} | — | September 8, 1999 | Socorro | LINEAR | · | 3.1 km | MPC · JPL |
| 102159 | 1999 RY_{213} | — | September 13, 1999 | Kitt Peak | Spacewatch | · | 1.4 km | MPC · JPL |
| 102160 | 1999 RG_{216} | — | September 4, 1999 | Anderson Mesa | LONEOS | · | 2.1 km | MPC · JPL |
| 102161 | 1999 RM_{217} | — | September 3, 1999 | Anderson Mesa | LONEOS | · | 2.9 km | MPC · JPL |
| 102162 | 1999 RH_{219} | — | September 5, 1999 | Kitt Peak | Spacewatch | MAS | 1.2 km | MPC · JPL |
| 102163 | 1999 RT_{219} | — | September 4, 1999 | Anderson Mesa | LONEOS | · | 1.8 km | MPC · JPL |
| 102164 | 1999 RE_{220} | — | September 4, 1999 | Catalina | CSS | V | 1.4 km | MPC · JPL |
| 102165 | 1999 RH_{220} | — | September 4, 1999 | Catalina | CSS | CYB | 9.4 km | MPC · JPL |
| 102166 | 1999 RR_{221} | — | September 5, 1999 | Catalina | CSS | · | 1.9 km | MPC · JPL |
| 102167 | 1999 RC_{223} | — | September 7, 1999 | Catalina | CSS | CYB | 10 km | MPC · JPL |
| 102168 | 1999 RD_{227} | — | September 5, 1999 | Catalina | CSS | V | 1.1 km | MPC · JPL |
| 102169 | 1999 RT_{227} | — | September 7, 1999 | Anderson Mesa | LONEOS | · | 1.2 km | MPC · JPL |
| 102170 | 1999 RA_{230} | — | September 8, 1999 | Catalina | CSS | · | 2.1 km | MPC · JPL |
| 102171 | 1999 RH_{230} | — | September 8, 1999 | Catalina | CSS | · | 1.3 km | MPC · JPL |
| 102172 | 1999 RW_{230} | — | September 8, 1999 | Catalina | CSS | (883) | 1.8 km | MPC · JPL |
| 102173 | 1999 RQ_{233} | — | September 8, 1999 | Catalina | CSS | · | 2.4 km | MPC · JPL |
| 102174 | 1999 RG_{234} | — | September 8, 1999 | Catalina | CSS | · | 2.2 km | MPC · JPL |
| 102175 | 1999 RK_{234} | — | September 8, 1999 | Catalina | CSS | · | 1.2 km | MPC · JPL |
| 102176 | 1999 RV_{235} | — | September 8, 1999 | Catalina | CSS | PHO | 2.0 km | MPC · JPL |
| 102177 | 1999 RS_{236} | — | September 8, 1999 | Catalina | CSS | V | 2.3 km | MPC · JPL |
| 102178 | 1999 RD_{237} | — | September 8, 1999 | Catalina | CSS | · | 2.7 km | MPC · JPL |
| 102179 | 1999 RX_{237} | — | September 8, 1999 | Catalina | CSS | · | 4.1 km | MPC · JPL |
| 102180 | 1999 RV_{238} | — | September 8, 1999 | Catalina | CSS | · | 2.5 km | MPC · JPL |
| 102181 | 1999 RT_{240} | — | September 11, 1999 | Anderson Mesa | LONEOS | EUN | 2.6 km | MPC · JPL |
| 102182 | 1999 RN_{241} | — | September 14, 1999 | Catalina | CSS | · | 4.1 km | MPC · JPL |
| 102183 | 1999 RL_{242} | — | September 4, 1999 | Anderson Mesa | LONEOS | · | 1.4 km | MPC · JPL |
| 102184 | 1999 RX_{242} | — | September 4, 1999 | Anderson Mesa | LONEOS | · | 1.7 km | MPC · JPL |
| 102185 | 1999 RJ_{250} | — | September 7, 1999 | Socorro | LINEAR | (2076) | 1.3 km | MPC · JPL |
| 102186 | 1999 RC_{251} | — | September 5, 1999 | Kitt Peak | Spacewatch | MAS | 910 m | MPC · JPL |
| 102187 | 1999 RQ_{253} | — | September 9, 1999 | Socorro | LINEAR | · | 2.0 km | MPC · JPL |
| 102188 | 1999 RD_{255} | — | September 4, 1999 | Anderson Mesa | LONEOS | · | 1.4 km | MPC · JPL |
| 102189 | 1999 SX_{1} | — | September 18, 1999 | Socorro | LINEAR | T_{j} (2.98) | 8.6 km | MPC · JPL |
| 102190 | 1999 SR_{3} | — | September 27, 1999 | Socorro | LINEAR | · | 8.3 km | MPC · JPL |
| 102191 | 1999 SH_{4} | — | September 29, 1999 | Višnjan Observatory | K. Korlević | · | 1.6 km | MPC · JPL |
| 102192 | 1999 SP_{5} | — | September 30, 1999 | Socorro | LINEAR | PHO | 2.4 km | MPC · JPL |
| 102193 | 1999 SD_{6} | — | September 30, 1999 | Socorro | LINEAR | · | 2.4 km | MPC · JPL |
| 102194 | 1999 SV_{7} | — | September 29, 1999 | Socorro | LINEAR | · | 2.0 km | MPC · JPL |
| 102195 | 1999 ST_{10} | — | September 30, 1999 | Catalina | CSS | V | 1.6 km | MPC · JPL |
| 102196 | 1999 SC_{11} | — | September 30, 1999 | Catalina | CSS | PHO | 2.8 km | MPC · JPL |
| 102197 | 1999 SR_{11} | — | September 30, 1999 | Catalina | CSS | PHO | 1.9 km | MPC · JPL |
| 102198 | 1999 SU_{11} | — | September 30, 1999 | Catalina | CSS | · | 2.6 km | MPC · JPL |
| 102199 | 1999 SE_{13} | — | September 30, 1999 | Socorro | LINEAR | JUN | 3.0 km | MPC · JPL |
| 102200 | 1999 SU_{13} | — | September 29, 1999 | Catalina | CSS | · | 1.6 km | MPC · JPL |

== 102201–102300 ==
back to top

| Designation | | | Discovery | | | Properties | | Ref |
| Permanent | Provisional | Named after | Date | Site | Discoverer(s) | Category | Diam. | Ref |
|---|---|---|---|---|---|---|---|---|
| 102201 | 1999 SD_{15} | — | September 29, 1999 | Catalina | CSS | · | 3.3 km | MPC · JPL |
| 102202 | 1999 SC_{17} | — | September 30, 1999 | Catalina | CSS | · | 4.7 km | MPC · JPL |
| 102203 | 1999 SC_{19} | — | September 30, 1999 | Socorro | LINEAR | · | 2.8 km | MPC · JPL |
| 102204 | 1999 SE_{19} | — | September 30, 1999 | Socorro | LINEAR | · | 5.1 km | MPC · JPL |
| 102205 | 1999 SB_{20} | — | September 30, 1999 | Socorro | LINEAR | · | 1.9 km | MPC · JPL |
| 102206 | 1999 SM_{20} | — | September 30, 1999 | Socorro | LINEAR | · | 1.7 km | MPC · JPL |
| 102207 | 1999 SK_{21} | — | September 30, 1999 | Kitt Peak | Spacewatch | (5) | 1.4 km | MPC · JPL |
| 102208 | 1999 SD_{22} | — | September 21, 1999 | Anderson Mesa | LONEOS | · | 2.1 km | MPC · JPL |
| 102209 | 1999 SG_{25} | — | September 30, 1999 | Catalina | CSS | · | 2.0 km | MPC · JPL |
| 102210 | 1999 SE_{27} | — | September 29, 1999 | Catalina | CSS | · | 3.8 km | MPC · JPL |
| 102211 Angelofaggiano | 1999 TQ | Angelofaggiano | October 1, 1999 | Campo Catino | M. Di Sora, F. Mallia | · | 2.4 km | MPC · JPL |
| 102212 | 1999 TA_{1} | — | October 1, 1999 | Višnjan Observatory | K. Korlević | · | 1.2 km | MPC · JPL |
| 102213 | 1999 TL_{1} | — | October 1, 1999 | Višnjan Observatory | K. Korlević | · | 2.7 km | MPC · JPL |
| 102214 | 1999 TO_{1} | — | October 1, 1999 | Višnjan Observatory | K. Korlević | · | 4.1 km | MPC · JPL |
| 102215 | 1999 TR_{3} | — | October 2, 1999 | Ondřejov | L. Kotková | · | 1.6 km | MPC · JPL |
| 102216 Carona | 1999 TG_{4} | Carona | October 3, 1999 | Nacogdoches | McCormack, B. D., Carona, D. W. | LIX | 7.6 km | MPC · JPL |
| 102217 | 1999 TW_{4} | — | October 4, 1999 | Socorro | LINEAR | · | 3.1 km | MPC · JPL |
| 102218 | 1999 TA_{6} | — | October 5, 1999 | Farpoint | G. Bell, G. Hug | CYB | 8.8 km | MPC · JPL |
| 102219 | 1999 TB_{6} | — | October 6, 1999 | Farpoint | G. Bell, G. Hug | · | 1.4 km | MPC · JPL |
| 102220 | 1999 TJ_{8} | — | October 6, 1999 | Višnjan Observatory | K. Korlević, M. Jurić | · | 2.5 km | MPC · JPL |
| 102221 | 1999 TT_{9} | — | October 7, 1999 | Višnjan Observatory | K. Korlević, M. Jurić | · | 2.2 km | MPC · JPL |
| 102222 | 1999 TA_{12} | — | October 8, 1999 | Črni Vrh | H. Mikuž, S. Matičič | NYS | 2.1 km | MPC · JPL |
| 102223 | 1999 TE_{12} | — | October 10, 1999 | Gnosca | S. Sposetti | · | 3.3 km | MPC · JPL |
| 102224 Raffaellolena | 1999 TG_{12} | Raffaellolena | October 10, 1999 | Gnosca | S. Sposetti | NYS | 1.5 km | MPC · JPL |
| 102225 | 1999 TU_{12} | — | October 10, 1999 | Fountain Hills | C. W. Juels | · | 2.1 km | MPC · JPL |
| 102226 | 1999 TL_{13} | — | October 8, 1999 | Hudson | Brady, S. | · | 1.4 km | MPC · JPL |
| 102227 | 1999 TB_{14} | — | October 13, 1999 | Prescott | P. G. Comba | · | 2.2 km | MPC · JPL |
| 102228 | 1999 TG_{15} | — | October 12, 1999 | Ondřejov | P. Pravec, P. Kušnirák | · | 4.7 km | MPC · JPL |
| 102229 | 1999 TS_{17} | — | October 15, 1999 | Ondřejov | P. Pravec, P. Kušnirák | · | 2.6 km | MPC · JPL |
| 102230 | 1999 TA_{18} | — | October 10, 1999 | Xinglong | SCAP | · | 3.7 km | MPC · JPL |
| 102231 | 1999 TS_{18} | — | October 14, 1999 | Xinglong | SCAP | · | 2.2 km | MPC · JPL |
| 102232 | 1999 TX_{18} | — | October 12, 1999 | Črni Vrh | Mikuž, H. | · | 2.3 km | MPC · JPL |
| 102233 | 1999 TJ_{19} | — | October 10, 1999 | Calgary | Billings, G. W. | · | 2.7 km | MPC · JPL |
| 102234 Olivebyrne | 1999 TK_{20} | Olivebyrne | October 5, 1999 | Goodricke-Pigott | R. A. Tucker | NYS | 2.1 km | MPC · JPL |
| 102235 | 1999 TN_{21} | — | October 13, 1999 | Bergisch Gladbach | W. Bickel | · | 2.4 km | MPC · JPL |
| 102236 | 1999 TO_{21} | — | October 2, 1999 | Kitt Peak | Spacewatch | · | 1.6 km | MPC · JPL |
| 102237 | 1999 TQ_{21} | — | October 2, 1999 | Kitt Peak | Spacewatch | EOS | 3.7 km | MPC · JPL |
| 102238 | 1999 TH_{22} | — | October 3, 1999 | Kitt Peak | Spacewatch | · | 1.9 km | MPC · JPL |
| 102239 | 1999 TK_{22} | — | October 3, 1999 | Kitt Peak | Spacewatch | · | 4.4 km | MPC · JPL |
| 102240 | 1999 TN_{22} | — | October 3, 1999 | Kitt Peak | Spacewatch | NYS | 2.1 km | MPC · JPL |
| 102241 | 1999 TT_{22} | — | October 3, 1999 | Kitt Peak | Spacewatch | NYS · | 3.1 km | MPC · JPL |
| 102242 | 1999 TE_{25} | — | October 3, 1999 | Socorro | LINEAR | · | 2.1 km | MPC · JPL |
| 102243 | 1999 TE_{26} | — | October 3, 1999 | Socorro | LINEAR | · | 3.4 km | MPC · JPL |
| 102244 | 1999 TJ_{26} | — | October 3, 1999 | Socorro | LINEAR | · | 1.8 km | MPC · JPL |
| 102245 | 1999 TO_{26} | — | October 3, 1999 | Socorro | LINEAR | · | 2.7 km | MPC · JPL |
| 102246 | 1999 TV_{26} | — | October 3, 1999 | Socorro | LINEAR | NYS | 1.4 km | MPC · JPL |
| 102247 | 1999 TY_{26} | — | October 3, 1999 | Socorro | LINEAR | · | 1.4 km | MPC · JPL |
| 102248 | 1999 TD_{27} | — | October 3, 1999 | Socorro | LINEAR | · | 1.9 km | MPC · JPL |
| 102249 | 1999 TE_{27} | — | October 3, 1999 | Socorro | LINEAR | EUN | 2.8 km | MPC · JPL |
| 102250 | 1999 TU_{27} | — | October 3, 1999 | Socorro | LINEAR | EUN | 3.2 km | MPC · JPL |
| 102251 | 1999 TD_{28} | — | October 3, 1999 | Socorro | LINEAR | · | 2.0 km | MPC · JPL |
| 102252 | 1999 TG_{28} | — | October 3, 1999 | Socorro | LINEAR | NYS | 2.0 km | MPC · JPL |
| 102253 | 1999 TH_{28} | — | October 3, 1999 | Socorro | LINEAR | NYS | 2.0 km | MPC · JPL |
| 102254 | 1999 TO_{28} | — | October 4, 1999 | Socorro | LINEAR | NYS | 2.0 km | MPC · JPL |
| 102255 | 1999 TR_{29} | — | October 4, 1999 | Socorro | LINEAR | · | 2.2 km | MPC · JPL |
| 102256 | 1999 TP_{30} | — | October 4, 1999 | Socorro | LINEAR | NYS | 2.2 km | MPC · JPL |
| 102257 | 1999 TZ_{30} | — | October 4, 1999 | Socorro | LINEAR | NYS | 2.2 km | MPC · JPL |
| 102258 | 1999 TR_{31} | — | October 4, 1999 | Socorro | LINEAR | NYS | 1.8 km | MPC · JPL |
| 102259 | 1999 TK_{32} | — | October 4, 1999 | Socorro | LINEAR | · | 2.2 km | MPC · JPL |
| 102260 | 1999 TM_{33} | — | October 4, 1999 | Socorro | LINEAR | V | 1.2 km | MPC · JPL |
| 102261 | 1999 TF_{34} | — | October 1, 1999 | Catalina | CSS | · | 1.5 km | MPC · JPL |
| 102262 | 1999 TJ_{34} | — | October 1, 1999 | Catalina | CSS | · | 1.8 km | MPC · JPL |
| 102263 | 1999 TF_{37} | — | October 13, 1999 | Anderson Mesa | LONEOS | · | 1.8 km | MPC · JPL |
| 102264 | 1999 TU_{37} | — | October 1, 1999 | Catalina | CSS | · | 1.9 km | MPC · JPL |
| 102265 | 1999 TK_{38} | — | October 1, 1999 | Catalina | CSS | · | 3.0 km | MPC · JPL |
| 102266 | 1999 TD_{40} | — | October 5, 1999 | Catalina | CSS | NYS | 2.7 km | MPC · JPL |
| 102267 | 1999 TZ_{40} | — | October 5, 1999 | Catalina | CSS | (5) | 2.4 km | MPC · JPL |
| 102268 | 1999 TU_{43} | — | October 3, 1999 | Kitt Peak | Spacewatch | · | 2.0 km | MPC · JPL |
| 102269 | 1999 TH_{44} | — | October 3, 1999 | Kitt Peak | Spacewatch | · | 3.7 km | MPC · JPL |
| 102270 | 1999 TH_{45} | — | October 3, 1999 | Kitt Peak | Spacewatch | · | 2.2 km | MPC · JPL |
| 102271 | 1999 TK_{45} | — | October 3, 1999 | Kitt Peak | Spacewatch | · | 3.0 km | MPC · JPL |
| 102272 | 1999 TG_{46} | — | October 4, 1999 | Kitt Peak | Spacewatch | URS | 6.7 km | MPC · JPL |
| 102273 | 1999 TM_{46} | — | October 4, 1999 | Kitt Peak | Spacewatch | · | 1.7 km | MPC · JPL |
| 102274 | 1999 TV_{46} | — | October 4, 1999 | Kitt Peak | Spacewatch | NYS | 1.6 km | MPC · JPL |
| 102275 | 1999 TW_{50} | — | October 4, 1999 | Kitt Peak | Spacewatch | · | 3.3 km | MPC · JPL |
| 102276 | 1999 TJ_{53} | — | October 6, 1999 | Kitt Peak | Spacewatch | · | 1.2 km | MPC · JPL |
| 102277 | 1999 TY_{54} | — | October 6, 1999 | Kitt Peak | Spacewatch | · | 1.4 km | MPC · JPL |
| 102278 | 1999 TH_{55} | — | October 6, 1999 | Kitt Peak | Spacewatch | (5) | 1.8 km | MPC · JPL |
| 102279 | 1999 TS_{57} | — | October 6, 1999 | Kitt Peak | Spacewatch | · | 1.7 km | MPC · JPL |
| 102280 | 1999 TE_{59} | — | October 6, 1999 | Kitt Peak | Spacewatch | · | 2.5 km | MPC · JPL |
| 102281 | 1999 TM_{59} | — | October 7, 1999 | Kitt Peak | Spacewatch | · | 2.0 km | MPC · JPL |
| 102282 | 1999 TX_{62} | — | October 7, 1999 | Kitt Peak | Spacewatch | NYS | 1.8 km | MPC · JPL |
| 102283 | 1999 TG_{63} | — | October 7, 1999 | Kitt Peak | Spacewatch | · | 4.6 km | MPC · JPL |
| 102284 | 1999 TM_{63} | — | October 7, 1999 | Kitt Peak | Spacewatch | · | 2.5 km | MPC · JPL |
| 102285 | 1999 TP_{63} | — | October 7, 1999 | Kitt Peak | Spacewatch | · | 2.3 km | MPC · JPL |
| 102286 | 1999 TR_{65} | — | October 8, 1999 | Kitt Peak | Spacewatch | MAS | 1.4 km | MPC · JPL |
| 102287 | 1999 TB_{66} | — | October 8, 1999 | Kitt Peak | Spacewatch | · | 2.7 km | MPC · JPL |
| 102288 | 1999 TR_{69} | — | October 9, 1999 | Kitt Peak | Spacewatch | · | 2.8 km | MPC · JPL |
| 102289 | 1999 TS_{71} | — | October 9, 1999 | Kitt Peak | Spacewatch | · | 1.3 km | MPC · JPL |
| 102290 | 1999 TH_{74} | — | October 10, 1999 | Kitt Peak | Spacewatch | · | 1.5 km | MPC · JPL |
| 102291 | 1999 TT_{74} | — | October 10, 1999 | Kitt Peak | Spacewatch | MAS | 1.2 km | MPC · JPL |
| 102292 | 1999 TX_{75} | — | October 10, 1999 | Kitt Peak | Spacewatch | · | 1.7 km | MPC · JPL |
| 102293 | 1999 TK_{79} | — | October 11, 1999 | Kitt Peak | Spacewatch | NYS | 1.8 km | MPC · JPL |
| 102294 | 1999 TW_{79} | — | October 11, 1999 | Kitt Peak | Spacewatch | NYS | 1.6 km | MPC · JPL |
| 102295 | 1999 TM_{81} | — | October 12, 1999 | Kitt Peak | Spacewatch | · | 2.3 km | MPC · JPL |
| 102296 | 1999 TF_{83} | — | October 12, 1999 | Kitt Peak | Spacewatch | · | 2.4 km | MPC · JPL |
| 102297 | 1999 TH_{85} | — | October 14, 1999 | Kitt Peak | Spacewatch | · | 2.3 km | MPC · JPL |
| 102298 | 1999 TO_{86} | — | October 15, 1999 | Kitt Peak | Spacewatch | · | 2.0 km | MPC · JPL |
| 102299 | 1999 TV_{86} | — | October 15, 1999 | Kitt Peak | Spacewatch | · | 1.4 km | MPC · JPL |
| 102300 | 1999 TS_{87} | — | October 15, 1999 | Kitt Peak | Spacewatch | · | 2.0 km | MPC · JPL |

== 102301–102400 ==
back to top

| Designation | | | Discovery | | | Properties | | Ref |
| Permanent | Provisional | Named after | Date | Site | Discoverer(s) | Category | Diam. | Ref |
|---|---|---|---|---|---|---|---|---|
| 102301 | 1999 TO_{90} | — | October 2, 1999 | Socorro | LINEAR | · | 2.4 km | MPC · JPL |
| 102302 | 1999 TK_{91} | — | October 2, 1999 | Socorro | LINEAR | · | 1.9 km | MPC · JPL |
| 102303 | 1999 TQ_{91} | — | October 2, 1999 | Socorro | LINEAR | · | 1.7 km | MPC · JPL |
| 102304 | 1999 TB_{92} | — | October 2, 1999 | Socorro | LINEAR | · | 2.5 km | MPC · JPL |
| 102305 | 1999 TG_{92} | — | October 2, 1999 | Socorro | LINEAR | V | 1.6 km | MPC · JPL |
| 102306 | 1999 TF_{93} | — | October 2, 1999 | Socorro | LINEAR | · | 3.6 km | MPC · JPL |
| 102307 | 1999 TV_{95} | — | October 2, 1999 | Socorro | LINEAR | · | 1.6 km | MPC · JPL |
| 102308 | 1999 TF_{96} | — | October 2, 1999 | Socorro | LINEAR | · | 2.2 km | MPC · JPL |
| 102309 | 1999 TM_{96} | — | October 2, 1999 | Socorro | LINEAR | · | 2.7 km | MPC · JPL |
| 102310 | 1999 TR_{96} | — | October 2, 1999 | Socorro | LINEAR | (2076) | 1.5 km | MPC · JPL |
| 102311 | 1999 TU_{96} | — | October 2, 1999 | Socorro | LINEAR | · | 2.6 km | MPC · JPL |
| 102312 | 1999 TA_{98} | — | October 2, 1999 | Socorro | LINEAR | · | 7.3 km | MPC · JPL |
| 102313 | 1999 TS_{98} | — | October 2, 1999 | Socorro | LINEAR | · | 3.6 km | MPC · JPL |
| 102314 | 1999 TB_{99} | — | October 2, 1999 | Socorro | LINEAR | PHO | 3.8 km | MPC · JPL |
| 102315 | 1999 TT_{99} | — | October 2, 1999 | Socorro | LINEAR | · | 3.4 km | MPC · JPL |
| 102316 | 1999 TN_{100} | — | October 2, 1999 | Socorro | LINEAR | · | 1.8 km | MPC · JPL |
| 102317 | 1999 TP_{101} | — | October 2, 1999 | Socorro | LINEAR | · | 2.5 km | MPC · JPL |
| 102318 | 1999 TF_{103} | — | October 2, 1999 | Socorro | LINEAR | · | 4.2 km | MPC · JPL |
| 102319 | 1999 TW_{103} | — | October 3, 1999 | Socorro | LINEAR | · | 2.4 km | MPC · JPL |
| 102320 | 1999 TF_{104} | — | October 3, 1999 | Socorro | LINEAR | · | 2.4 km | MPC · JPL |
| 102321 | 1999 TL_{105} | — | October 3, 1999 | Socorro | LINEAR | · | 2.5 km | MPC · JPL |
| 102322 | 1999 TS_{105} | — | October 3, 1999 | Socorro | LINEAR | · | 1.8 km | MPC · JPL |
| 102323 | 1999 TR_{106} | — | October 4, 1999 | Socorro | LINEAR | · | 6.9 km | MPC · JPL |
| 102324 | 1999 TZ_{106} | — | October 4, 1999 | Socorro | LINEAR | URS | 6.6 km | MPC · JPL |
| 102325 | 1999 TB_{107} | — | October 4, 1999 | Socorro | LINEAR | · | 6.6 km | MPC · JPL |
| 102326 | 1999 TM_{108} | — | October 4, 1999 | Socorro | LINEAR | · | 2.0 km | MPC · JPL |
| 102327 | 1999 TG_{109} | — | October 4, 1999 | Socorro | LINEAR | · | 4.2 km | MPC · JPL |
| 102328 | 1999 TJ_{109} | — | October 4, 1999 | Socorro | LINEAR | · | 1.4 km | MPC · JPL |
| 102329 | 1999 TM_{110} | — | October 4, 1999 | Socorro | LINEAR | V | 1.6 km | MPC · JPL |
| 102330 | 1999 TA_{111} | — | October 4, 1999 | Socorro | LINEAR | · | 1.3 km | MPC · JPL |
| 102331 | 1999 TA_{112} | — | October 4, 1999 | Socorro | LINEAR | · | 2.3 km | MPC · JPL |
| 102332 | 1999 TG_{112} | — | October 4, 1999 | Socorro | LINEAR | NYS | 2.2 km | MPC · JPL |
| 102333 | 1999 TK_{112} | — | October 4, 1999 | Socorro | LINEAR | · | 1.1 km | MPC · JPL |
| 102334 | 1999 TP_{112} | — | October 4, 1999 | Socorro | LINEAR | · | 1.7 km | MPC · JPL |
| 102335 | 1999 TZ_{112} | — | October 4, 1999 | Socorro | LINEAR | · | 8.6 km | MPC · JPL |
| 102336 | 1999 TA_{114} | — | October 4, 1999 | Socorro | LINEAR | · | 2.3 km | MPC · JPL |
| 102337 | 1999 TN_{114} | — | October 4, 1999 | Socorro | LINEAR | · | 2.4 km | MPC · JPL |
| 102338 | 1999 TD_{115} | — | October 4, 1999 | Socorro | LINEAR | (5) | 2.2 km | MPC · JPL |
| 102339 | 1999 TH_{115} | — | October 4, 1999 | Socorro | LINEAR | V | 1.6 km | MPC · JPL |
| 102340 | 1999 TE_{116} | — | October 4, 1999 | Socorro | LINEAR | · | 2.4 km | MPC · JPL |
| 102341 | 1999 TR_{118} | — | October 4, 1999 | Socorro | LINEAR | · | 2.2 km | MPC · JPL |
| 102342 | 1999 TO_{120} | — | October 4, 1999 | Socorro | LINEAR | V | 1.3 km | MPC · JPL |
| 102343 | 1999 TP_{120} | — | October 4, 1999 | Socorro | LINEAR | · | 3.6 km | MPC · JPL |
| 102344 | 1999 TA_{121} | — | October 4, 1999 | Socorro | LINEAR | NYS | 1.7 km | MPC · JPL |
| 102345 | 1999 TQ_{121} | — | October 4, 1999 | Socorro | LINEAR | · | 2.0 km | MPC · JPL |
| 102346 | 1999 TF_{122} | — | October 4, 1999 | Socorro | LINEAR | · | 2.7 km | MPC · JPL |
| 102347 | 1999 TJ_{122} | — | October 4, 1999 | Socorro | LINEAR | · | 1.4 km | MPC · JPL |
| 102348 | 1999 TT_{122} | — | October 4, 1999 | Socorro | LINEAR | · | 6.7 km | MPC · JPL |
| 102349 | 1999 TX_{122} | — | October 4, 1999 | Socorro | LINEAR | · | 2.3 km | MPC · JPL |
| 102350 | 1999 TJ_{123} | — | October 4, 1999 | Socorro | LINEAR | · | 2.7 km | MPC · JPL |
| 102351 | 1999 TY_{123} | — | October 4, 1999 | Socorro | LINEAR | · | 1.6 km | MPC · JPL |
| 102352 | 1999 TY_{126} | — | October 4, 1999 | Socorro | LINEAR | · | 1.1 km | MPC · JPL |
| 102353 | 1999 TQ_{127} | — | October 4, 1999 | Socorro | LINEAR | · | 2.2 km | MPC · JPL |
| 102354 | 1999 TD_{130} | — | October 6, 1999 | Socorro | LINEAR | · | 1.7 km | MPC · JPL |
| 102355 | 1999 TC_{131} | — | October 6, 1999 | Socorro | LINEAR | · | 5.8 km | MPC · JPL |
| 102356 | 1999 TN_{133} | — | October 6, 1999 | Socorro | LINEAR | · | 1.8 km | MPC · JPL |
| 102357 | 1999 TZ_{133} | — | October 6, 1999 | Socorro | LINEAR | MAS | 1.1 km | MPC · JPL |
| 102358 | 1999 TN_{134} | — | October 6, 1999 | Socorro | LINEAR | · | 2.4 km | MPC · JPL |
| 102359 | 1999 TO_{134} | — | October 6, 1999 | Socorro | LINEAR | · | 2.9 km | MPC · JPL |
| 102360 | 1999 TU_{134} | — | October 6, 1999 | Socorro | LINEAR | · | 2.5 km | MPC · JPL |
| 102361 | 1999 TE_{136} | — | October 6, 1999 | Socorro | LINEAR | · | 1.7 km | MPC · JPL |
| 102362 | 1999 TS_{138} | — | October 6, 1999 | Socorro | LINEAR | · | 3.3 km | MPC · JPL |
| 102363 | 1999 TG_{139} | — | October 6, 1999 | Socorro | LINEAR | NYS | 2.7 km | MPC · JPL |
| 102364 | 1999 TR_{139} | — | October 6, 1999 | Socorro | LINEAR | NYS | 2.5 km | MPC · JPL |
| 102365 | 1999 TU_{139} | — | October 6, 1999 | Socorro | LINEAR | · | 1.5 km | MPC · JPL |
| 102366 | 1999 TR_{140} | — | October 6, 1999 | Socorro | LINEAR | · | 1.9 km | MPC · JPL |
| 102367 | 1999 TS_{140} | — | October 6, 1999 | Socorro | LINEAR | · | 1.8 km | MPC · JPL |
| 102368 | 1999 TB_{141} | — | October 6, 1999 | Socorro | LINEAR | · | 3.2 km | MPC · JPL |
| 102369 | 1999 TC_{142} | — | October 7, 1999 | Socorro | LINEAR | · | 2.4 km | MPC · JPL |
| 102370 | 1999 TE_{143} | — | October 7, 1999 | Socorro | LINEAR | EUN | 2.4 km | MPC · JPL |
| 102371 | 1999 TW_{143} | — | October 7, 1999 | Socorro | LINEAR | slow | 2.6 km | MPC · JPL |
| 102372 | 1999 TL_{144} | — | October 7, 1999 | Socorro | LINEAR | V | 1.3 km | MPC · JPL |
| 102373 | 1999 TP_{144} | — | October 7, 1999 | Socorro | LINEAR | · | 2.5 km | MPC · JPL |
| 102374 | 1999 TY_{144} | — | October 7, 1999 | Socorro | LINEAR | · | 2.6 km | MPC · JPL |
| 102375 | 1999 TK_{145} | — | October 7, 1999 | Socorro | LINEAR | EOS | 3.7 km | MPC · JPL |
| 102376 | 1999 TX_{145} | — | October 7, 1999 | Socorro | LINEAR | · | 3.9 km | MPC · JPL |
| 102377 | 1999 TZ_{145} | — | October 7, 1999 | Socorro | LINEAR | NYS | 2.0 km | MPC · JPL |
| 102378 | 1999 TA_{146} | — | October 7, 1999 | Socorro | LINEAR | · | 2.4 km | MPC · JPL |
| 102379 | 1999 TR_{146} | — | October 7, 1999 | Socorro | LINEAR | KOR | 2.8 km | MPC · JPL |
| 102380 | 1999 TE_{150} | — | October 7, 1999 | Socorro | LINEAR | · | 1.8 km | MPC · JPL |
| 102381 | 1999 TU_{151} | — | October 7, 1999 | Socorro | LINEAR | V | 1.6 km | MPC · JPL |
| 102382 | 1999 TZ_{151} | — | October 7, 1999 | Socorro | LINEAR | V | 1.6 km | MPC · JPL |
| 102383 | 1999 TH_{152} | — | October 7, 1999 | Socorro | LINEAR | · | 2.6 km | MPC · JPL |
| 102384 | 1999 TL_{152} | — | October 7, 1999 | Socorro | LINEAR | · | 2.0 km | MPC · JPL |
| 102385 | 1999 TQ_{152} | — | October 7, 1999 | Socorro | LINEAR | · | 2.6 km | MPC · JPL |
| 102386 | 1999 TB_{153} | — | October 7, 1999 | Socorro | LINEAR | V · slow | 1.9 km | MPC · JPL |
| 102387 | 1999 TB_{155} | — | October 7, 1999 | Socorro | LINEAR | · | 1.6 km | MPC · JPL |
| 102388 | 1999 TG_{155} | — | October 7, 1999 | Socorro | LINEAR | · | 2.9 km | MPC · JPL |
| 102389 | 1999 TM_{155} | — | October 7, 1999 | Socorro | LINEAR | · | 2.4 km | MPC · JPL |
| 102390 | 1999 TP_{155} | — | October 7, 1999 | Socorro | LINEAR | · | 1.9 km | MPC · JPL |
| 102391 | 1999 TH_{157} | — | October 9, 1999 | Socorro | LINEAR | · | 6.5 km | MPC · JPL |
| 102392 | 1999 TN_{157} | — | October 9, 1999 | Socorro | LINEAR | · | 2.2 km | MPC · JPL |
| 102393 | 1999 TA_{160} | — | October 9, 1999 | Socorro | LINEAR | · | 2.4 km | MPC · JPL |
| 102394 | 1999 TL_{161} | — | October 9, 1999 | Socorro | LINEAR | · | 1.3 km | MPC · JPL |
| 102395 | 1999 TE_{164} | — | October 9, 1999 | Socorro | LINEAR | V | 1.4 km | MPC · JPL |
| 102396 | 1999 TD_{166} | — | October 10, 1999 | Socorro | LINEAR | V | 1.2 km | MPC · JPL |
| 102397 | 1999 TN_{167} | — | October 10, 1999 | Socorro | LINEAR | · | 2.2 km | MPC · JPL |
| 102398 | 1999 TZ_{168} | — | October 10, 1999 | Socorro | LINEAR | V | 1.1 km | MPC · JPL |
| 102399 | 1999 TG_{169} | — | October 10, 1999 | Socorro | LINEAR | · | 1.5 km | MPC · JPL |
| 102400 | 1999 TW_{169} | — | October 10, 1999 | Socorro | LINEAR | NYS | 1.9 km | MPC · JPL |

== 102401–102500 ==
back to top

| Designation | | | Discovery | | | Properties | | Ref |
| Permanent | Provisional | Named after | Date | Site | Discoverer(s) | Category | Diam. | Ref |
|---|---|---|---|---|---|---|---|---|
| 102401 | 1999 TY_{169} | — | October 10, 1999 | Socorro | LINEAR | AGN | 2.5 km | MPC · JPL |
| 102402 | 1999 TS_{171} | — | October 10, 1999 | Socorro | LINEAR | · | 2.5 km | MPC · JPL |
| 102403 | 1999 TB_{172} | — | October 10, 1999 | Socorro | LINEAR | · | 2.1 km | MPC · JPL |
| 102404 | 1999 TJ_{172} | — | October 10, 1999 | Socorro | LINEAR | · | 1.6 km | MPC · JPL |
| 102405 | 1999 TP_{172} | — | October 10, 1999 | Socorro | LINEAR | · | 1.5 km | MPC · JPL |
| 102406 | 1999 TR_{173} | — | October 10, 1999 | Socorro | LINEAR | MAS | 1.1 km | MPC · JPL |
| 102407 | 1999 TW_{174} | — | October 10, 1999 | Socorro | LINEAR | · | 2.1 km | MPC · JPL |
| 102408 | 1999 TM_{175} | — | October 10, 1999 | Socorro | LINEAR | · | 2.0 km | MPC · JPL |
| 102409 | 1999 TN_{175} | — | October 10, 1999 | Socorro | LINEAR | · | 2.2 km | MPC · JPL |
| 102410 | 1999 TS_{175} | — | October 10, 1999 | Socorro | LINEAR | · | 3.3 km | MPC · JPL |
| 102411 | 1999 TB_{177} | — | October 10, 1999 | Socorro | LINEAR | · | 2.0 km | MPC · JPL |
| 102412 | 1999 TZ_{179} | — | October 10, 1999 | Socorro | LINEAR | MAS | 1.7 km | MPC · JPL |
| 102413 | 1999 TC_{181} | — | October 10, 1999 | Socorro | LINEAR | · | 3.4 km | MPC · JPL |
| 102414 | 1999 TA_{182} | — | October 11, 1999 | Socorro | LINEAR | · | 2.2 km | MPC · JPL |
| 102415 | 1999 TH_{183} | — | October 11, 1999 | Socorro | LINEAR | · | 2.1 km | MPC · JPL |
| 102416 | 1999 TL_{184} | — | October 12, 1999 | Socorro | LINEAR | PHO | 3.7 km | MPC · JPL |
| 102417 | 1999 TN_{184} | — | October 12, 1999 | Socorro | LINEAR | PHO | 1.9 km | MPC · JPL |
| 102418 | 1999 TN_{187} | — | October 12, 1999 | Socorro | LINEAR | · | 2.5 km | MPC · JPL |
| 102419 | 1999 TD_{189} | — | October 12, 1999 | Socorro | LINEAR | · | 10 km | MPC · JPL |
| 102420 | 1999 TC_{190} | — | October 12, 1999 | Socorro | LINEAR | EUN | 2.3 km | MPC · JPL |
| 102421 | 1999 TZ_{190} | — | October 12, 1999 | Socorro | LINEAR | · | 3.3 km | MPC · JPL |
| 102422 | 1999 TW_{191} | — | October 12, 1999 | Socorro | LINEAR | BAP | 1.8 km | MPC · JPL |
| 102423 | 1999 TJ_{192} | — | October 12, 1999 | Socorro | LINEAR | · | 4.8 km | MPC · JPL |
| 102424 | 1999 TD_{194} | — | October 12, 1999 | Socorro | LINEAR | · | 2.1 km | MPC · JPL |
| 102425 | 1999 TN_{194} | — | October 12, 1999 | Socorro | LINEAR | · | 1.9 km | MPC · JPL |
| 102426 | 1999 TY_{196} | — | October 12, 1999 | Socorro | LINEAR | · | 2.7 km | MPC · JPL |
| 102427 | 1999 TK_{200} | — | October 12, 1999 | Socorro | LINEAR | · | 2.3 km | MPC · JPL |
| 102428 | 1999 TD_{201} | — | October 13, 1999 | Socorro | LINEAR | · | 1.6 km | MPC · JPL |
| 102429 | 1999 TD_{202} | — | October 13, 1999 | Socorro | LINEAR | · | 1.7 km | MPC · JPL |
| 102430 | 1999 TG_{204} | — | October 13, 1999 | Socorro | LINEAR | V | 1.4 km | MPC · JPL |
| 102431 | 1999 TL_{205} | — | October 13, 1999 | Socorro | LINEAR | · | 1.8 km | MPC · JPL |
| 102432 | 1999 TA_{207} | — | October 14, 1999 | Socorro | LINEAR | · | 8.8 km | MPC · JPL |
| 102433 | 1999 TL_{209} | — | October 14, 1999 | Socorro | LINEAR | PHO | 2.1 km | MPC · JPL |
| 102434 | 1999 TD_{210} | — | October 14, 1999 | Socorro | LINEAR | · | 6.6 km | MPC · JPL |
| 102435 | 1999 TN_{210} | — | October 14, 1999 | Socorro | LINEAR | EUN | 2.7 km | MPC · JPL |
| 102436 | 1999 TX_{211} | — | October 15, 1999 | Socorro | LINEAR | (5) | 2.0 km | MPC · JPL |
| 102437 | 1999 TY_{212} | — | October 15, 1999 | Socorro | LINEAR | · | 2.7 km | MPC · JPL |
| 102438 | 1999 TJ_{213} | — | October 15, 1999 | Socorro | LINEAR | · | 2.0 km | MPC · JPL |
| 102439 | 1999 TQ_{213} | — | October 15, 1999 | Socorro | LINEAR | · | 1.8 km | MPC · JPL |
| 102440 | 1999 TW_{213} | — | October 15, 1999 | Socorro | LINEAR | MAS | 1.3 km | MPC · JPL |
| 102441 | 1999 TX_{213} | — | October 15, 1999 | Socorro | LINEAR | · | 1.9 km | MPC · JPL |
| 102442 | 1999 TZ_{214} | — | October 15, 1999 | Socorro | LINEAR | KOR | 3.1 km | MPC · JPL |
| 102443 | 1999 TB_{215} | — | October 15, 1999 | Socorro | LINEAR | NYS | 2.4 km | MPC · JPL |
| 102444 | 1999 TT_{215} | — | October 15, 1999 | Socorro | LINEAR | (5) | 2.5 km | MPC · JPL |
| 102445 | 1999 TF_{216} | — | October 15, 1999 | Socorro | LINEAR | · | 2.4 km | MPC · JPL |
| 102446 | 1999 TO_{216} | — | October 15, 1999 | Socorro | LINEAR | · | 1.8 km | MPC · JPL |
| 102447 | 1999 TR_{216} | — | October 15, 1999 | Socorro | LINEAR | · | 2.3 km | MPC · JPL |
| 102448 | 1999 TS_{216} | — | October 15, 1999 | Socorro | LINEAR | · | 2.6 km | MPC · JPL |
| 102449 | 1999 TC_{217} | — | October 15, 1999 | Socorro | LINEAR | ERI | 2.7 km | MPC · JPL |
| 102450 | 1999 TD_{217} | — | October 15, 1999 | Socorro | LINEAR | MAS | 1.6 km | MPC · JPL |
| 102451 | 1999 TL_{217} | — | October 15, 1999 | Socorro | LINEAR | · | 2.1 km | MPC · JPL |
| 102452 | 1999 TV_{217} | — | October 15, 1999 | Socorro | LINEAR | · | 1.8 km | MPC · JPL |
| 102453 | 1999 TW_{217} | — | October 15, 1999 | Socorro | LINEAR | V | 1.1 km | MPC · JPL |
| 102454 | 1999 TY_{218} | — | October 1, 1999 | Catalina | CSS | · | 1.4 km | MPC · JPL |
| 102455 | 1999 TU_{220} | — | October 1, 1999 | Catalina | CSS | · | 2.9 km | MPC · JPL |
| 102456 | 1999 TJ_{221} | — | October 2, 1999 | Socorro | LINEAR | V | 1.2 km | MPC · JPL |
| 102457 | 1999 TP_{221} | — | October 2, 1999 | Anderson Mesa | LONEOS | · | 2.4 km | MPC · JPL |
| 102458 | 1999 TH_{225} | — | October 2, 1999 | Kitt Peak | Spacewatch | EOS | 3.5 km | MPC · JPL |
| 102459 | 1999 TD_{226} | — | October 2, 1999 | Kitt Peak | Spacewatch | · | 1.3 km | MPC · JPL |
| 102460 | 1999 TN_{226} | — | October 3, 1999 | Kitt Peak | Spacewatch | · | 2.0 km | MPC · JPL |
| 102461 | 1999 TG_{227} | — | October 1, 1999 | Anderson Mesa | LONEOS | · | 1.3 km | MPC · JPL |
| 102462 | 1999 TE_{229} | — | October 4, 1999 | Anderson Mesa | LONEOS | · | 1.7 km | MPC · JPL |
| 102463 | 1999 TD_{230} | — | October 3, 1999 | Anderson Mesa | LONEOS | · | 1.8 km | MPC · JPL |
| 102464 | 1999 TG_{230} | — | October 3, 1999 | Anderson Mesa | LONEOS | · | 2.1 km | MPC · JPL |
| 102465 | 1999 TB_{231} | — | October 5, 1999 | Catalina | CSS | · | 7.2 km | MPC · JPL |
| 102466 | 1999 TW_{232} | — | October 6, 1999 | Socorro | LINEAR | · | 2.0 km | MPC · JPL |
| 102467 | 1999 TA_{233} | — | October 7, 1999 | Catalina | CSS | MAR | 3.0 km | MPC · JPL |
| 102468 | 1999 TV_{234} | — | October 3, 1999 | Catalina | CSS | · | 1.6 km | MPC · JPL |
| 102469 | 1999 TC_{237} | — | October 3, 1999 | Catalina | CSS | · | 1.6 km | MPC · JPL |
| 102470 | 1999 TQ_{239} | — | October 4, 1999 | Catalina | CSS | · | 1.8 km | MPC · JPL |
| 102471 | 1999 TN_{241} | — | October 4, 1999 | Catalina | CSS | V | 1.5 km | MPC · JPL |
| 102472 | 1999 TT_{242} | — | October 4, 1999 | Catalina | CSS | · | 4.3 km | MPC · JPL |
| 102473 | 1999 TW_{244} | — | October 7, 1999 | Catalina | CSS | · | 4.2 km | MPC · JPL |
| 102474 | 1999 TZ_{245} | — | October 7, 1999 | Catalina | CSS | EUN | 2.2 km | MPC · JPL |
| 102475 | 1999 TA_{246} | — | October 7, 1999 | Catalina | CSS | EUN | 2.3 km | MPC · JPL |
| 102476 | 1999 TC_{246} | — | October 8, 1999 | Catalina | CSS | · | 3.0 km | MPC · JPL |
| 102477 | 1999 TQ_{247} | — | October 8, 1999 | Catalina | CSS | · | 2.9 km | MPC · JPL |
| 102478 | 1999 TN_{248} | — | October 8, 1999 | Catalina | CSS | · | 2.2 km | MPC · JPL |
| 102479 | 1999 TQ_{250} | — | October 9, 1999 | Catalina | CSS | · | 2.1 km | MPC · JPL |
| 102480 | 1999 TW_{250} | — | October 9, 1999 | Catalina | CSS | · | 3.4 km | MPC · JPL |
| 102481 | 1999 TG_{252} | — | October 8, 1999 | Socorro | LINEAR | · | 3.7 km | MPC · JPL |
| 102482 | 1999 TH_{252} | — | October 8, 1999 | Socorro | LINEAR | · | 2.7 km | MPC · JPL |
| 102483 | 1999 TA_{253} | — | October 9, 1999 | Socorro | LINEAR | · | 4.9 km | MPC · JPL |
| 102484 | 1999 TU_{256} | — | October 9, 1999 | Socorro | LINEAR | · | 1.9 km | MPC · JPL |
| 102485 | 1999 TQ_{258} | — | October 9, 1999 | Socorro | LINEAR | · | 2.3 km | MPC · JPL |
| 102486 | 1999 TY_{258} | — | October 9, 1999 | Socorro | LINEAR | (5) | 1.7 km | MPC · JPL |
| 102487 | 1999 TF_{260} | — | October 10, 1999 | Kitt Peak | Spacewatch | · | 1.8 km | MPC · JPL |
| 102488 | 1999 TU_{260} | — | October 12, 1999 | Socorro | LINEAR | · | 1.8 km | MPC · JPL |
| 102489 | 1999 TC_{262} | — | October 13, 1999 | Socorro | LINEAR | · | 1.9 km | MPC · JPL |
| 102490 | 1999 TD_{264} | — | October 15, 1999 | Kitt Peak | Spacewatch | · | 5.2 km | MPC · JPL |
| 102491 | 1999 TK_{264} | — | October 15, 1999 | Kitt Peak | Spacewatch | · | 3.5 km | MPC · JPL |
| 102492 | 1999 TG_{265} | — | October 3, 1999 | Socorro | LINEAR | · | 14 km | MPC · JPL |
| 102493 | 1999 TW_{265} | — | October 3, 1999 | Socorro | LINEAR | PHO | 2.8 km | MPC · JPL |
| 102494 | 1999 TQ_{273} | — | October 5, 1999 | Socorro | LINEAR | · | 4.8 km | MPC · JPL |
| 102495 | 1999 TH_{274} | — | October 6, 1999 | Socorro | LINEAR | · | 1.4 km | MPC · JPL |
| 102496 | 1999 TT_{277} | — | October 6, 1999 | Socorro | LINEAR | · | 3.6 km | MPC · JPL |
| 102497 | 1999 TY_{278} | — | October 6, 1999 | Socorro | LINEAR | · | 3.1 km | MPC · JPL |
| 102498 | 1999 TQ_{280} | — | October 8, 1999 | Socorro | LINEAR | · | 1.8 km | MPC · JPL |
| 102499 | 1999 TD_{282} | — | October 8, 1999 | Socorro | LINEAR | · | 5.2 km | MPC · JPL |
| 102500 | 1999 TG_{283} | — | October 9, 1999 | Socorro | LINEAR | · | 3.9 km | MPC · JPL |

== 102501–102600 ==
back to top

| Designation | | | Discovery | | | Properties | | Ref |
| Permanent | Provisional | Named after | Date | Site | Discoverer(s) | Category | Diam. | Ref |
|---|---|---|---|---|---|---|---|---|
| 102501 | 1999 TZ_{283} | — | October 9, 1999 | Socorro | LINEAR | · | 2.7 km | MPC · JPL |
| 102502 | 1999 TF_{285} | — | October 9, 1999 | Socorro | LINEAR | PHO | 1.6 km | MPC · JPL |
| 102503 | 1999 TJ_{288} | — | October 10, 1999 | Socorro | LINEAR | NYS · | 3.2 km | MPC · JPL |
| 102504 | 1999 TV_{288} | — | October 10, 1999 | Socorro | LINEAR | · | 1.8 km | MPC · JPL |
| 102505 | 1999 TZ_{288} | — | October 10, 1999 | Socorro | LINEAR | · | 1.3 km | MPC · JPL |
| 102506 | 1999 TU_{289} | — | October 10, 1999 | Socorro | LINEAR | NYS | 1.9 km | MPC · JPL |
| 102507 | 1999 TL_{290} | — | October 10, 1999 | Socorro | LINEAR | · | 2.6 km | MPC · JPL |
| 102508 | 1999 TZ_{291} | — | October 11, 1999 | Socorro | LINEAR | NYS | 2.0 km | MPC · JPL |
| 102509 | 1999 TE_{293} | — | October 12, 1999 | Socorro | LINEAR | · | 2.8 km | MPC · JPL |
| 102510 | 1999 TP_{293} | — | October 12, 1999 | Socorro | LINEAR | · | 2.4 km | MPC · JPL |
| 102511 | 1999 TQ_{298} | — | October 2, 1999 | Kitt Peak | Spacewatch | NYS | 1.9 km | MPC · JPL |
| 102512 | 1999 TO_{300} | — | October 3, 1999 | Kitt Peak | Spacewatch | · | 7.3 km | MPC · JPL |
| 102513 | 1999 TE_{303} | — | October 4, 1999 | Kitt Peak | Spacewatch | · | 1.6 km | MPC · JPL |
| 102514 | 1999 TC_{304} | — | October 4, 1999 | Catalina | CSS | V | 1.4 km | MPC · JPL |
| 102515 | 1999 TT_{305} | — | October 3, 1999 | Catalina | CSS | · | 1.7 km | MPC · JPL |
| 102516 | 1999 TC_{306} | — | October 6, 1999 | Socorro | LINEAR | · | 1.2 km | MPC · JPL |
| 102517 | 1999 TZ_{309} | — | October 4, 1999 | Kitt Peak | Spacewatch | · | 2.6 km | MPC · JPL |
| 102518 | 1999 TB_{312} | — | October 8, 1999 | Kitt Peak | Spacewatch | · | 1.5 km | MPC · JPL |
| 102519 | 1999 TO_{312} | — | October 5, 1999 | Anderson Mesa | LONEOS | · | 1.5 km | MPC · JPL |
| 102520 | 1999 TW_{318} | — | October 12, 1999 | Kitt Peak | Spacewatch | · | 2.1 km | MPC · JPL |
| 102521 | 1999 TE_{319} | — | October 9, 1999 | Socorro | LINEAR | NYS | 1.8 km | MPC · JPL |
| 102522 | 1999 TC_{321} | — | October 10, 1999 | Socorro | LINEAR | · | 3.6 km | MPC · JPL |
| 102523 | 1999 UG | — | October 16, 1999 | Višnjan Observatory | K. Korlević | MAS | 1.8 km | MPC · JPL |
| 102524 | 1999 UK | — | October 16, 1999 | Višnjan Observatory | K. Korlević | · | 2.4 km | MPC · JPL |
| 102525 | 1999 UV | — | October 16, 1999 | Višnjan Observatory | K. Korlević | · | 2.8 km | MPC · JPL |
| 102526 | 1999 UG_{1} | — | October 16, 1999 | Višnjan Observatory | K. Korlević | · | 2.1 km | MPC · JPL |
| 102527 | 1999 UH_{2} | — | October 17, 1999 | Višnjan Observatory | K. Korlević | · | 1.8 km | MPC · JPL |
| 102528 | 1999 US_{3} | — | October 26, 1999 | Anderson Mesa | LONEOS | T_{j} (2.97) | 13 km | MPC · JPL |
| 102529 | 1999 UD_{4} | — | October 27, 1999 | Višnjan Observatory | K. Korlević | V | 2.0 km | MPC · JPL |
| 102530 | 1999 UF_{4} | — | October 30, 1999 | Biosphere 2 | G. J. Garradd | · | 2.4 km | MPC · JPL |
| 102531 | 1999 UP_{4} | — | October 31, 1999 | Ondřejov | L. Kotková | NYS | 1.5 km | MPC · JPL |
| 102532 | 1999 UU_{4} | — | October 31, 1999 | Modra | Galád, A., Tóth | · | 2.5 km | MPC · JPL |
| 102533 | 1999 UB_{5} | — | October 28, 1999 | Catalina | CSS | · | 2.3 km | MPC · JPL |
| 102534 | 1999 UJ_{5} | — | October 29, 1999 | Socorro | LINEAR | · | 9.1 km | MPC · JPL |
| 102535 | 1999 UL_{6} | — | October 28, 1999 | Xinglong | SCAP | · | 2.4 km | MPC · JPL |
| 102536 Luanenjie | 1999 UN_{6} | Luanenjie | October 28, 1999 | Xinglong | SCAP | · | 5.7 km | MPC · JPL |
| 102537 | 1999 UY_{7} | — | October 29, 1999 | Catalina | CSS | V | 1.3 km | MPC · JPL |
| 102538 | 1999 UZ_{9} | — | October 31, 1999 | Socorro | LINEAR | PHO | 2.3 km | MPC · JPL |
| 102539 | 1999 UT_{10} | — | October 31, 1999 | Socorro | LINEAR | PHO | 3.4 km | MPC · JPL |
| 102540 | 1999 UV_{11} | — | October 29, 1999 | Kitt Peak | Spacewatch | · | 2.4 km | MPC · JPL |
| 102541 | 1999 UN_{12} | — | October 28, 1999 | Catalina | CSS | (5) | 3.7 km | MPC · JPL |
| 102542 | 1999 UT_{12} | — | October 29, 1999 | Catalina | CSS | · | 3.6 km | MPC · JPL |
| 102543 | 1999 UV_{12} | — | October 29, 1999 | Catalina | CSS | V | 1.6 km | MPC · JPL |
| 102544 | 1999 UK_{13} | — | October 29, 1999 | Catalina | CSS | · | 1.9 km | MPC · JPL |
| 102545 | 1999 UP_{14} | — | October 29, 1999 | Catalina | CSS | · | 3.1 km | MPC · JPL |
| 102546 | 1999 UQ_{15} | — | October 29, 1999 | Catalina | CSS | · | 3.0 km | MPC · JPL |
| 102547 | 1999 UW_{15} | — | October 29, 1999 | Catalina | CSS | · | 1.4 km | MPC · JPL |
| 102548 | 1999 UF_{16} | — | October 29, 1999 | Catalina | CSS | V | 1.7 km | MPC · JPL |
| 102549 | 1999 UP_{16} | — | October 29, 1999 | Catalina | CSS | · | 2.0 km | MPC · JPL |
| 102550 | 1999 UY_{17} | — | October 30, 1999 | Kitt Peak | Spacewatch | MAS | 1.3 km | MPC · JPL |
| 102551 | 1999 UC_{18} | — | October 30, 1999 | Kitt Peak | Spacewatch | · | 1.9 km | MPC · JPL |
| 102552 | 1999 UF_{20} | — | October 31, 1999 | Kitt Peak | Spacewatch | · | 1.7 km | MPC · JPL |
| 102553 | 1999 UJ_{20} | — | October 31, 1999 | Kitt Peak | Spacewatch | NYS | 1.7 km | MPC · JPL |
| 102554 | 1999 US_{21} | — | October 31, 1999 | Kitt Peak | Spacewatch | · | 1.8 km | MPC · JPL |
| 102555 | 1999 UG_{22} | — | October 31, 1999 | Kitt Peak | Spacewatch | · | 2.1 km | MPC · JPL |
| 102556 | 1999 UW_{23} | — | October 28, 1999 | Catalina | CSS | V | 1.7 km | MPC · JPL |
| 102557 | 1999 UY_{23} | — | October 28, 1999 | Catalina | CSS | · | 1.8 km | MPC · JPL |
| 102558 | 1999 UJ_{24} | — | October 28, 1999 | Catalina | CSS | DOR | 6.4 km | MPC · JPL |
| 102559 | 1999 UJ_{25} | — | October 28, 1999 | Catalina | CSS | CYB | 9.6 km | MPC · JPL |
| 102560 | 1999 UR_{25} | — | October 29, 1999 | Catalina | CSS | NYS | 2.7 km | MPC · JPL |
| 102561 | 1999 UX_{27} | — | October 30, 1999 | Kitt Peak | Spacewatch | GEF | 4.7 km | MPC · JPL |
| 102562 | 1999 UD_{28} | — | October 30, 1999 | Kitt Peak | Spacewatch | · | 1.4 km | MPC · JPL |
| 102563 | 1999 UW_{29} | — | October 31, 1999 | Kitt Peak | Spacewatch | · | 2.0 km | MPC · JPL |
| 102564 | 1999 UH_{30} | — | October 31, 1999 | Kitt Peak | Spacewatch | NYS | 2.0 km | MPC · JPL |
| 102565 | 1999 UL_{30} | — | October 31, 1999 | Kitt Peak | Spacewatch | · | 1.6 km | MPC · JPL |
| 102566 | 1999 UB_{32} | — | October 31, 1999 | Kitt Peak | Spacewatch | · | 1.9 km | MPC · JPL |
| 102567 | 1999 UY_{32} | — | October 31, 1999 | Kitt Peak | Spacewatch | · | 2.0 km | MPC · JPL |
| 102568 | 1999 UG_{35} | — | October 31, 1999 | Kitt Peak | Spacewatch | NYS | 2.2 km | MPC · JPL |
| 102569 | 1999 UQ_{35} | — | October 30, 1999 | Kitt Peak | Spacewatch | · | 2.0 km | MPC · JPL |
| 102570 | 1999 UW_{35} | — | October 31, 1999 | Kitt Peak | Spacewatch | V | 1.1 km | MPC · JPL |
| 102571 | 1999 UX_{35} | — | October 31, 1999 | Kitt Peak | Spacewatch | · | 1.5 km | MPC · JPL |
| 102572 | 1999 UW_{36} | — | October 16, 1999 | Kitt Peak | Spacewatch | · | 1.2 km | MPC · JPL |
| 102573 | 1999 UH_{40} | — | October 16, 1999 | Socorro | LINEAR | V | 1.2 km | MPC · JPL |
| 102574 | 1999 UH_{41} | — | October 17, 1999 | Anderson Mesa | LONEOS | · | 3.8 km | MPC · JPL |
| 102575 | 1999 UQ_{42} | — | October 28, 1999 | Catalina | CSS | · | 4.0 km | MPC · JPL |
| 102576 | 1999 UZ_{42} | — | October 28, 1999 | Catalina | CSS | · | 3.3 km | MPC · JPL |
| 102577 | 1999 UE_{43} | — | October 28, 1999 | Catalina | CSS | · | 2.4 km | MPC · JPL |
| 102578 | 1999 UO_{43} | — | October 28, 1999 | Catalina | CSS | · | 3.7 km | MPC · JPL |
| 102579 | 1999 UZ_{43} | — | October 29, 1999 | Catalina | CSS | EUN | 2.8 km | MPC · JPL |
| 102580 | 1999 UC_{44} | — | October 29, 1999 | Catalina | CSS | · | 1.2 km | MPC · JPL |
| 102581 | 1999 US_{44} | — | October 30, 1999 | Catalina | CSS | V | 1.6 km | MPC · JPL |
| 102582 | 1999 UD_{46} | — | October 31, 1999 | Catalina | CSS | · | 4.1 km | MPC · JPL |
| 102583 | 1999 UE_{47} | — | October 29, 1999 | Catalina | CSS | · | 3.0 km | MPC · JPL |
| 102584 | 1999 UE_{48} | — | October 30, 1999 | Catalina | CSS | RAF | 3.2 km | MPC · JPL |
| 102585 | 1999 UJ_{48} | — | October 30, 1999 | Catalina | CSS | · | 2.2 km | MPC · JPL |
| 102586 | 1999 UR_{49} | — | October 30, 1999 | Catalina | CSS | · | 1.0 km | MPC · JPL |
| 102587 | 1999 UA_{50} | — | October 30, 1999 | Catalina | CSS | · | 2.7 km | MPC · JPL |
| 102588 | 1999 UM_{52} | — | October 31, 1999 | Catalina | CSS | slow | 4.1 km | MPC · JPL |
| 102589 | 1999 UP_{52} | — | October 31, 1999 | Catalina | CSS | · | 1.9 km | MPC · JPL |
| 102590 | 1999 UT_{52} | — | October 31, 1999 | Catalina | CSS | · | 3.7 km | MPC · JPL |
| 102591 | 1999 UP_{57} | — | October 29, 1999 | Kitt Peak | Spacewatch | · | 1.3 km | MPC · JPL |
| 102592 | 1999 VE_{1} | — | November 4, 1999 | Olathe | Olathe | · | 2.6 km | MPC · JPL |
| 102593 | 1999 VY_{1} | — | November 5, 1999 | Oaxaca | Roe, J. M. | · | 2.0 km | MPC · JPL |
| 102594 | 1999 VC_{3} | — | November 1, 1999 | Kitt Peak | Spacewatch | V | 1.2 km | MPC · JPL |
| 102595 | 1999 VJ_{3} | — | November 1, 1999 | Kitt Peak | Spacewatch | MAS | 1.4 km | MPC · JPL |
| 102596 | 1999 VN_{3} | — | November 1, 1999 | Kitt Peak | Spacewatch | MAS | 1.2 km | MPC · JPL |
| 102597 | 1999 VS_{3} | — | November 1, 1999 | Kitt Peak | Spacewatch | · | 2.5 km | MPC · JPL |
| 102598 | 1999 VE_{4} | — | November 1, 1999 | Catalina | CSS | (5) | 2.1 km | MPC · JPL |
| 102599 | 1999 VX_{4} | — | November 5, 1999 | Višnjan Observatory | K. Korlević | · | 2.3 km | MPC · JPL |
| 102600 | 1999 VC_{5} | — | November 5, 1999 | Višnjan Observatory | K. Korlević | (5) | 2.9 km | MPC · JPL |

== 102601–102700 ==
back to top

| Designation | | | Discovery | | | Properties | | Ref |
| Permanent | Provisional | Named after | Date | Site | Discoverer(s) | Category | Diam. | Ref |
|---|---|---|---|---|---|---|---|---|
| 102601 | 1999 VD_{5} | — | November 5, 1999 | Višnjan Observatory | K. Korlević | NYS | 1.8 km | MPC · JPL |
| 102602 | 1999 VG_{5} | — | November 7, 1999 | Višnjan Observatory | K. Korlević | · | 1.6 km | MPC · JPL |
| 102603 | 1999 VP_{5} | — | November 6, 1999 | Fountain Hills | C. W. Juels | · | 3.0 km | MPC · JPL |
| 102604 | 1999 VW_{5} | — | November 5, 1999 | Oizumi | T. Kobayashi | MAS | 1.8 km | MPC · JPL |
| 102605 | 1999 VH_{9} | — | November 8, 1999 | Višnjan Observatory | K. Korlević | · | 3.2 km | MPC · JPL |
| 102606 | 1999 VA_{10} | — | November 9, 1999 | Fountain Hills | C. W. Juels | · | 5.4 km | MPC · JPL |
| 102607 | 1999 VJ_{11} | — | November 10, 1999 | Višnjan Observatory | K. Korlević | · | 3.6 km | MPC · JPL |
| 102608 | 1999 VH_{13} | — | November 1, 1999 | Socorro | LINEAR | BAR | 2.7 km | MPC · JPL |
| 102609 | 1999 VJ_{14} | — | November 2, 1999 | Socorro | LINEAR | PHO | 2.6 km | MPC · JPL |
| 102610 | 1999 VQ_{15} | — | November 2, 1999 | Kitt Peak | Spacewatch | · | 3.2 km | MPC · JPL |
| 102611 | 1999 VK_{19} | — | November 10, 1999 | Višnjan Observatory | K. Korlević | · | 3.9 km | MPC · JPL |
| 102612 | 1999 VY_{19} | — | November 9, 1999 | Višnjan Observatory | K. Korlević | NYS | 1.7 km | MPC · JPL |
| 102613 | 1999 VQ_{20} | — | November 11, 1999 | Fountain Hills | C. W. Juels | · | 4.1 km | MPC · JPL |
| 102614 | 1999 VG_{21} | — | November 12, 1999 | Višnjan Observatory | K. Korlević | · | 1.5 km | MPC · JPL |
| 102615 | 1999 VJ_{21} | — | November 12, 1999 | Višnjan Observatory | K. Korlević | NYS | 2.1 km | MPC · JPL |
| 102616 | 1999 VC_{22} | — | November 13, 1999 | Višnjan Observatory | K. Korlević | NYS | 3.0 km | MPC · JPL |
| 102617 Allium | 1999 VC_{23} | Allium | November 12, 1999 | Gnosca | S. Sposetti | · | 4.8 km | MPC · JPL |
| 102618 Marionacaldentey | 1999 VJ_{23} | Marionacaldentey | November 8, 1999 | Majorca | R. Pacheco, Á. López J. | · | 3.0 km | MPC · JPL |
| 102619 Crespino | 1999 VK_{23} | Crespino | November 12, 1999 | Gnosca | S. Sposetti | · | 3.4 km | MPC · JPL |
| 102620 | 1999 VX_{23} | — | November 9, 1999 | Nachi-Katsuura | Y. Shimizu, T. Urata | RAF | 2.3 km | MPC · JPL |
| 102621 Goshinosato | 1999 VO_{25} | Goshinosato | November 13, 1999 | Saji | Saji | (11882) | 2.7 km | MPC · JPL |
| 102622 | 1999 VR_{25} | — | November 15, 1999 | Kleť | Kleť | · | 3.0 km | MPC · JPL |
| 102623 | 1999 VM_{26} | — | November 3, 1999 | Socorro | LINEAR | · | 2.1 km | MPC · JPL |
| 102624 | 1999 VZ_{26} | — | November 3, 1999 | Socorro | LINEAR | EUN | 2.3 km | MPC · JPL |
| 102625 | 1999 VX_{27} | — | November 15, 1999 | Farpoint | G. Bell, G. Hug | · | 5.0 km | MPC · JPL |
| 102626 | 1999 VY_{27} | — | November 15, 1999 | Modra | Kornoš, L., Tóth | PHO | 5.3 km | MPC · JPL |
| 102627 | 1999 VZ_{27} | — | November 11, 1999 | Catalina | CSS | · | 7.9 km | MPC · JPL |
| 102628 | 1999 VG_{28} | — | November 3, 1999 | Socorro | LINEAR | V | 1.5 km | MPC · JPL |
| 102629 | 1999 VQ_{28} | — | November 3, 1999 | Socorro | LINEAR | NYS | 2.2 km | MPC · JPL |
| 102630 | 1999 VM_{30} | — | November 3, 1999 | Socorro | LINEAR | · | 2.4 km | MPC · JPL |
| 102631 | 1999 VR_{31} | — | November 3, 1999 | Socorro | LINEAR | GEF | 2.7 km | MPC · JPL |
| 102632 | 1999 VX_{32} | — | November 3, 1999 | Socorro | LINEAR | · | 1.8 km | MPC · JPL |
| 102633 | 1999 VY_{33} | — | November 3, 1999 | Socorro | LINEAR | NYS | 2.6 km | MPC · JPL |
| 102634 | 1999 VD_{34} | — | November 3, 1999 | Socorro | LINEAR | DOR | 6.3 km | MPC · JPL |
| 102635 | 1999 VH_{34} | — | November 3, 1999 | Socorro | LINEAR | NYS | 2.6 km | MPC · JPL |
| 102636 | 1999 VV_{37} | — | November 3, 1999 | Socorro | LINEAR | · | 5.2 km | MPC · JPL |
| 102637 | 1999 VH_{38} | — | November 10, 1999 | Socorro | LINEAR | · | 3.3 km | MPC · JPL |
| 102638 | 1999 VQ_{38} | — | November 10, 1999 | Socorro | LINEAR | · | 1.7 km | MPC · JPL |
| 102639 | 1999 VV_{38} | — | November 10, 1999 | Socorro | LINEAR | V | 1.9 km | MPC · JPL |
| 102640 | 1999 VO_{39} | — | November 10, 1999 | Socorro | LINEAR | EUN | 2.3 km | MPC · JPL |
| 102641 | 1999 VV_{39} | — | November 11, 1999 | Kitt Peak | Spacewatch | · | 2.1 km | MPC · JPL |
| 102642 | 1999 VY_{42} | — | November 4, 1999 | Kitt Peak | Spacewatch | HYG | 5.8 km | MPC · JPL |
| 102643 | 1999 VQ_{43} | — | November 1, 1999 | Catalina | CSS | · | 2.7 km | MPC · JPL |
| 102644 | 1999 VA_{44} | — | November 3, 1999 | Catalina | CSS | · | 1.9 km | MPC · JPL |
| 102645 | 1999 VC_{44} | — | November 3, 1999 | Catalina | CSS | · | 1.5 km | MPC · JPL |
| 102646 | 1999 VT_{46} | — | November 3, 1999 | Socorro | LINEAR | HNS | 1.8 km | MPC · JPL |
| 102647 | 1999 VT_{47} | — | November 3, 1999 | Socorro | LINEAR | · | 6.9 km | MPC · JPL |
| 102648 | 1999 VR_{48} | — | November 3, 1999 | Socorro | LINEAR | · | 2.9 km | MPC · JPL |
| 102649 | 1999 VW_{48} | — | November 3, 1999 | Socorro | LINEAR | EOS | 3.6 km | MPC · JPL |
| 102650 | 1999 VM_{51} | — | November 3, 1999 | Socorro | LINEAR | · | 2.9 km | MPC · JPL |
| 102651 | 1999 VS_{51} | — | November 3, 1999 | Socorro | LINEAR | · | 2.2 km | MPC · JPL |
| 102652 | 1999 VQ_{52} | — | November 3, 1999 | Socorro | LINEAR | · | 2.8 km | MPC · JPL |
| 102653 | 1999 VG_{53} | — | November 3, 1999 | Socorro | LINEAR | (5) | 4.9 km | MPC · JPL |
| 102654 | 1999 VV_{53} | — | November 4, 1999 | Socorro | LINEAR | · | 3.2 km | MPC · JPL |
| 102655 | 1999 VV_{54} | — | November 4, 1999 | Socorro | LINEAR | NYS | 1.6 km | MPC · JPL |
| 102656 | 1999 VY_{54} | — | November 4, 1999 | Socorro | LINEAR | MAS | 1.6 km | MPC · JPL |
| 102657 | 1999 VZ_{54} | — | November 4, 1999 | Socorro | LINEAR | EOS | 3.7 km | MPC · JPL |
| 102658 | 1999 VK_{55} | — | November 4, 1999 | Socorro | LINEAR | MAS | 1.3 km | MPC · JPL |
| 102659 | 1999 VO_{55} | — | November 4, 1999 | Socorro | LINEAR | · | 1.4 km | MPC · JPL |
| 102660 | 1999 VA_{56} | — | November 4, 1999 | Socorro | LINEAR | · | 1.2 km | MPC · JPL |
| 102661 | 1999 VX_{57} | — | November 4, 1999 | Socorro | LINEAR | · | 1.4 km | MPC · JPL |
| 102662 | 1999 VZ_{58} | — | November 4, 1999 | Socorro | LINEAR | · | 2.9 km | MPC · JPL |
| 102663 | 1999 VA_{59} | — | November 4, 1999 | Socorro | LINEAR | · | 3.0 km | MPC · JPL |
| 102664 | 1999 VB_{59} | — | November 4, 1999 | Socorro | LINEAR | · | 1.5 km | MPC · JPL |
| 102665 | 1999 VC_{59} | — | November 4, 1999 | Socorro | LINEAR | NYS | 1.9 km | MPC · JPL |
| 102666 | 1999 VO_{60} | — | November 4, 1999 | Socorro | LINEAR | · | 1.6 km | MPC · JPL |
| 102667 | 1999 VB_{62} | — | November 4, 1999 | Socorro | LINEAR | PHO | 2.2 km | MPC · JPL |
| 102668 | 1999 VG_{62} | — | November 4, 1999 | Socorro | LINEAR | · | 2.8 km | MPC · JPL |
| 102669 | 1999 VQ_{62} | — | November 4, 1999 | Socorro | LINEAR | · | 3.5 km | MPC · JPL |
| 102670 | 1999 VT_{62} | — | November 4, 1999 | Socorro | LINEAR | · | 2.8 km | MPC · JPL |
| 102671 | 1999 VW_{62} | — | November 4, 1999 | Socorro | LINEAR | · | 2.8 km | MPC · JPL |
| 102672 | 1999 VY_{62} | — | November 4, 1999 | Socorro | LINEAR | EUN | 2.9 km | MPC · JPL |
| 102673 | 1999 VZ_{63} | — | November 4, 1999 | Socorro | LINEAR | · | 1.5 km | MPC · JPL |
| 102674 | 1999 VA_{66} | — | November 4, 1999 | Socorro | LINEAR | · | 3.7 km | MPC · JPL |
| 102675 | 1999 VM_{66} | — | November 4, 1999 | Socorro | LINEAR | · | 1.7 km | MPC · JPL |
| 102676 | 1999 VC_{67} | — | November 4, 1999 | Socorro | LINEAR | · | 2.8 km | MPC · JPL |
| 102677 | 1999 VJ_{68} | — | November 4, 1999 | Socorro | LINEAR | NYS | 2.3 km | MPC · JPL |
| 102678 | 1999 VL_{68} | — | November 4, 1999 | Socorro | LINEAR | NYS | 1.6 km | MPC · JPL |
| 102679 | 1999 VP_{68} | — | November 4, 1999 | Socorro | LINEAR | · | 1.1 km | MPC · JPL |
| 102680 | 1999 VQ_{68} | — | November 4, 1999 | Socorro | LINEAR | · | 1.6 km | MPC · JPL |
| 102681 | 1999 VM_{69} | — | November 4, 1999 | Socorro | LINEAR | (7744) | 2.5 km | MPC · JPL |
| 102682 | 1999 VQ_{69} | — | November 4, 1999 | Socorro | LINEAR | (2076) | 1.5 km | MPC · JPL |
| 102683 | 1999 VW_{69} | — | November 4, 1999 | Socorro | LINEAR | · | 1.6 km | MPC · JPL |
| 102684 | 1999 VG_{70} | — | November 4, 1999 | Socorro | LINEAR | · | 1.8 km | MPC · JPL |
| 102685 | 1999 VK_{70} | — | November 4, 1999 | Socorro | LINEAR | · | 2.0 km | MPC · JPL |
| 102686 | 1999 VS_{70} | — | November 4, 1999 | Socorro | LINEAR | · | 1.2 km | MPC · JPL |
| 102687 | 1999 VR_{71} | — | November 4, 1999 | Socorro | LINEAR | · | 1.4 km | MPC · JPL |
| 102688 | 1999 VK_{72} | — | November 12, 1999 | Xinglong | SCAP | · | 3.6 km | MPC · JPL |
| 102689 | 1999 VA_{73} | — | November 12, 1999 | Socorro | LINEAR | · | 2.0 km | MPC · JPL |
| 102690 | 1999 VG_{73} | — | November 1, 1999 | Kitt Peak | Spacewatch | · | 2.7 km | MPC · JPL |
| 102691 | 1999 VS_{73} | — | November 1, 1999 | Kitt Peak | Spacewatch | · | 4.3 km | MPC · JPL |
| 102692 | 1999 VW_{73} | — | November 1, 1999 | Kitt Peak | Spacewatch | NYS | 2.1 km | MPC · JPL |
| 102693 | 1999 VL_{77} | — | November 3, 1999 | Socorro | LINEAR | NYS | 1.7 km | MPC · JPL |
| 102694 | 1999 VO_{77} | — | November 3, 1999 | Socorro | LINEAR | · | 3.1 km | MPC · JPL |
| 102695 | 1999 VP_{77} | — | November 3, 1999 | Socorro | LINEAR | NYS | 1.5 km | MPC · JPL |
| 102696 | 1999 VA_{81} | — | November 4, 1999 | Socorro | LINEAR | NYS | 1.5 km | MPC · JPL |
| 102697 | 1999 VE_{84} | — | November 6, 1999 | Kitt Peak | Spacewatch | · | 3.1 km | MPC · JPL |
| 102698 | 1999 VL_{85} | — | November 5, 1999 | Catalina | CSS | ULA · CYB | 11 km | MPC · JPL |
| 102699 | 1999 VH_{86} | — | November 5, 1999 | Socorro | LINEAR | · | 2.0 km | MPC · JPL |
| 102700 | 1999 VR_{86} | — | November 7, 1999 | Socorro | LINEAR | · | 1.4 km | MPC · JPL |

== 102701–102800 ==
back to top

| Designation | | | Discovery | | | Properties | | Ref |
| Permanent | Provisional | Named after | Date | Site | Discoverer(s) | Category | Diam. | Ref |
|---|---|---|---|---|---|---|---|---|
| 102701 | 1999 VU_{86} | — | November 7, 1999 | Socorro | LINEAR | EUN | 1.8 km | MPC · JPL |
| 102702 | 1999 VY_{86} | — | November 7, 1999 | Socorro | LINEAR | · | 3.3 km | MPC · JPL |
| 102703 | 1999 VE_{87} | — | November 6, 1999 | Socorro | LINEAR | · | 3.1 km | MPC · JPL |
| 102704 | 1999 VO_{87} | — | November 5, 1999 | Socorro | LINEAR | EUN | 2.5 km | MPC · JPL |
| 102705 | 1999 VM_{88} | — | November 4, 1999 | Socorro | LINEAR | · | 2.1 km | MPC · JPL |
| 102706 | 1999 VT_{90} | — | November 5, 1999 | Socorro | LINEAR | · | 2.7 km | MPC · JPL |
| 102707 | 1999 VA_{91} | — | November 5, 1999 | Socorro | LINEAR | · | 1.2 km | MPC · JPL |
| 102708 | 1999 VB_{91} | — | November 5, 1999 | Socorro | LINEAR | · | 2.5 km | MPC · JPL |
| 102709 | 1999 VL_{91} | — | November 5, 1999 | Socorro | LINEAR | · | 3.4 km | MPC · JPL |
| 102710 | 1999 VM_{91} | — | November 5, 1999 | Socorro | LINEAR | · | 2.1 km | MPC · JPL |
| 102711 | 1999 VE_{93} | — | November 9, 1999 | Socorro | LINEAR | · | 2.4 km | MPC · JPL |
| 102712 | 1999 VQ_{93} | — | November 9, 1999 | Socorro | LINEAR | · | 2.3 km | MPC · JPL |
| 102713 | 1999 VT_{93} | — | November 9, 1999 | Socorro | LINEAR | KOR | 2.5 km | MPC · JPL |
| 102714 | 1999 VW_{93} | — | November 9, 1999 | Socorro | LINEAR | · | 1.2 km | MPC · JPL |
| 102715 | 1999 VZ_{93} | — | November 9, 1999 | Socorro | LINEAR | · | 2.8 km | MPC · JPL |
| 102716 | 1999 VZ_{94} | — | November 9, 1999 | Socorro | LINEAR | · | 1.3 km | MPC · JPL |
| 102717 | 1999 VO_{95} | — | November 9, 1999 | Socorro | LINEAR | · | 1.8 km | MPC · JPL |
| 102718 | 1999 VZ_{97} | — | November 9, 1999 | Socorro | LINEAR | · | 3.4 km | MPC · JPL |
| 102719 | 1999 VR_{98} | — | November 9, 1999 | Socorro | LINEAR | · | 1.6 km | MPC · JPL |
| 102720 | 1999 VW_{98} | — | November 9, 1999 | Socorro | LINEAR | · | 2.2 km | MPC · JPL |
| 102721 | 1999 VZ_{98} | — | November 9, 1999 | Socorro | LINEAR | V | 1.5 km | MPC · JPL |
| 102722 | 1999 VL_{99} | — | November 9, 1999 | Socorro | LINEAR | · | 2.4 km | MPC · JPL |
| 102723 | 1999 VM_{99} | — | November 9, 1999 | Socorro | LINEAR | · | 1.6 km | MPC · JPL |
| 102724 | 1999 VP_{99} | — | November 9, 1999 | Socorro | LINEAR | · | 2.1 km | MPC · JPL |
| 102725 | 1999 VE_{100} | — | November 9, 1999 | Socorro | LINEAR | NYS | 1.8 km | MPC · JPL |
| 102726 | 1999 VX_{100} | — | November 9, 1999 | Socorro | LINEAR | MAS | 1.1 km | MPC · JPL |
| 102727 | 1999 VF_{101} | — | November 9, 1999 | Socorro | LINEAR | · | 2.2 km | MPC · JPL |
| 102728 | 1999 VS_{101} | — | November 9, 1999 | Socorro | LINEAR | · | 2.7 km | MPC · JPL |
| 102729 | 1999 VX_{101} | — | November 9, 1999 | Socorro | LINEAR | · | 1.6 km | MPC · JPL |
| 102730 | 1999 VE_{102} | — | November 9, 1999 | Socorro | LINEAR | EUN | 2.1 km | MPC · JPL |
| 102731 | 1999 VJ_{102} | — | November 9, 1999 | Socorro | LINEAR | · | 3.0 km | MPC · JPL |
| 102732 | 1999 VV_{102} | — | November 9, 1999 | Socorro | LINEAR | · | 1.0 km | MPC · JPL |
| 102733 | 1999 VX_{103} | — | November 9, 1999 | Socorro | LINEAR | · | 2.2 km | MPC · JPL |
| 102734 | 1999 VB_{104} | — | November 9, 1999 | Socorro | LINEAR | · | 5.3 km | MPC · JPL |
| 102735 | 1999 VX_{104} | — | November 9, 1999 | Socorro | LINEAR | · | 2.0 km | MPC · JPL |
| 102736 | 1999 VE_{105} | — | November 9, 1999 | Socorro | LINEAR | · | 4.8 km | MPC · JPL |
| 102737 | 1999 VW_{105} | — | November 9, 1999 | Socorro | LINEAR | · | 2.2 km | MPC · JPL |
| 102738 | 1999 VM_{106} | — | November 9, 1999 | Socorro | LINEAR | · | 1.2 km | MPC · JPL |
| 102739 | 1999 VB_{107} | — | November 9, 1999 | Socorro | LINEAR | · | 2.8 km | MPC · JPL |
| 102740 | 1999 VJ_{107} | — | November 9, 1999 | Socorro | LINEAR | · | 3.0 km | MPC · JPL |
| 102741 | 1999 VX_{109} | — | November 9, 1999 | Socorro | LINEAR | NYS | 1.6 km | MPC · JPL |
| 102742 | 1999 VE_{111} | — | November 9, 1999 | Socorro | LINEAR | · | 1.4 km | MPC · JPL |
| 102743 | 1999 VJ_{111} | — | November 9, 1999 | Socorro | LINEAR | · | 3.1 km | MPC · JPL |
| 102744 | 1999 VO_{111} | — | November 9, 1999 | Socorro | LINEAR | · | 2.5 km | MPC · JPL |
| 102745 | 1999 VZ_{111} | — | November 9, 1999 | Socorro | LINEAR | · | 4.0 km | MPC · JPL |
| 102746 | 1999 VK_{113} | — | November 9, 1999 | Socorro | LINEAR | V | 1.3 km | MPC · JPL |
| 102747 | 1999 VB_{116} | — | November 4, 1999 | Kitt Peak | Spacewatch | · | 1.8 km | MPC · JPL |
| 102748 | 1999 VL_{117} | — | November 9, 1999 | Kitt Peak | Spacewatch | · | 4.9 km | MPC · JPL |
| 102749 | 1999 VY_{117} | — | November 9, 1999 | Kitt Peak | Spacewatch | · | 3.3 km | MPC · JPL |
| 102750 | 1999 VO_{119} | — | November 3, 1999 | Kitt Peak | Spacewatch | · | 1.8 km | MPC · JPL |
| 102751 | 1999 VR_{120} | — | November 4, 1999 | Kitt Peak | Spacewatch | V | 1.1 km | MPC · JPL |
| 102752 | 1999 VX_{121} | — | November 4, 1999 | Kitt Peak | Spacewatch | V | 1.0 km | MPC · JPL |
| 102753 | 1999 VB_{123} | — | November 5, 1999 | Kitt Peak | Spacewatch | · | 2.9 km | MPC · JPL |
| 102754 | 1999 VY_{123} | — | November 5, 1999 | Kitt Peak | Spacewatch | · | 1.6 km | MPC · JPL |
| 102755 | 1999 VX_{127} | — | November 9, 1999 | Kitt Peak | Spacewatch | NYS | 2.3 km | MPC · JPL |
| 102756 | 1999 VZ_{127} | — | November 9, 1999 | Kitt Peak | Spacewatch | · | 2.7 km | MPC · JPL |
| 102757 | 1999 VA_{128} | — | November 9, 1999 | Kitt Peak | Spacewatch | MAS | 1.3 km | MPC · JPL |
| 102758 | 1999 VK_{130} | — | November 9, 1999 | Catalina | CSS | · | 2.2 km | MPC · JPL |
| 102759 | 1999 VL_{130} | — | November 9, 1999 | Catalina | CSS | PHO | 1.8 km | MPC · JPL |
| 102760 | 1999 VG_{132} | — | November 9, 1999 | Kitt Peak | Spacewatch | MAS | 1.2 km | MPC · JPL |
| 102761 | 1999 VH_{133} | — | November 10, 1999 | Kitt Peak | Spacewatch | · | 1.3 km | MPC · JPL |
| 102762 | 1999 VX_{133} | — | November 10, 1999 | Kitt Peak | Spacewatch | · | 2.8 km | MPC · JPL |
| 102763 | 1999 VO_{135} | — | November 7, 1999 | Socorro | LINEAR | · | 2.0 km | MPC · JPL |
| 102764 | 1999 VF_{136} | — | November 9, 1999 | Socorro | LINEAR | V | 1.2 km | MPC · JPL |
| 102765 | 1999 VN_{136} | — | November 9, 1999 | Socorro | LINEAR | · | 2.6 km | MPC · JPL |
| 102766 | 1999 VQ_{136} | — | November 9, 1999 | Socorro | LINEAR | · | 2.6 km | MPC · JPL |
| 102767 | 1999 VZ_{136} | — | November 12, 1999 | Socorro | LINEAR | · | 1.0 km | MPC · JPL |
| 102768 | 1999 VC_{139} | — | November 9, 1999 | Kitt Peak | Spacewatch | · | 2.4 km | MPC · JPL |
| 102769 | 1999 VW_{139} | — | November 10, 1999 | Kitt Peak | Spacewatch | NYS | 2.2 km | MPC · JPL |
| 102770 | 1999 VK_{140} | — | November 10, 1999 | Kitt Peak | Spacewatch | · | 2.1 km | MPC · JPL |
| 102771 | 1999 VY_{141} | — | November 10, 1999 | Kitt Peak | Spacewatch | · | 1.8 km | MPC · JPL |
| 102772 | 1999 VT_{142} | — | November 11, 1999 | Kitt Peak | Spacewatch | · | 1.9 km | MPC · JPL |
| 102773 | 1999 VD_{144} | — | November 11, 1999 | Catalina | CSS | MIS | 3.6 km | MPC · JPL |
| 102774 | 1999 VH_{144} | — | November 11, 1999 | Catalina | CSS | · | 2.9 km | MPC · JPL |
| 102775 | 1999 VS_{144} | — | November 13, 1999 | Catalina | CSS | · | 9.3 km | MPC · JPL |
| 102776 | 1999 VZ_{144} | — | November 13, 1999 | Catalina | CSS | · | 5.7 km | MPC · JPL |
| 102777 | 1999 VH_{145} | — | November 8, 1999 | Socorro | LINEAR | · | 3.2 km | MPC · JPL |
| 102778 | 1999 VT_{145} | — | November 9, 1999 | Socorro | LINEAR | · | 2.2 km | MPC · JPL |
| 102779 | 1999 VN_{146} | — | November 12, 1999 | Socorro | LINEAR | · | 2.7 km | MPC · JPL |
| 102780 | 1999 VO_{147} | — | November 13, 1999 | Socorro | LINEAR | · | 1.1 km | MPC · JPL |
| 102781 | 1999 VO_{148} | — | November 14, 1999 | Socorro | LINEAR | · | 4.8 km | MPC · JPL |
| 102782 | 1999 VE_{151} | — | November 14, 1999 | Socorro | LINEAR | · | 3.2 km | MPC · JPL |
| 102783 | 1999 VK_{151} | — | November 14, 1999 | Socorro | LINEAR | V | 1.3 km | MPC · JPL |
| 102784 | 1999 VB_{152} | — | November 9, 1999 | Kitt Peak | Spacewatch | · | 2.2 km | MPC · JPL |
| 102785 | 1999 VW_{152} | — | November 10, 1999 | Kitt Peak | Spacewatch | · | 1.8 km | MPC · JPL |
| 102786 | 1999 VV_{153} | — | November 13, 1999 | Kitt Peak | Spacewatch | NYS | 1.8 km | MPC · JPL |
| 102787 | 1999 VN_{154} | — | November 12, 1999 | Kitt Peak | Spacewatch | · | 1.2 km | MPC · JPL |
| 102788 | 1999 VY_{154} | — | November 13, 1999 | Kitt Peak | Spacewatch | · | 2.1 km | MPC · JPL |
| 102789 | 1999 VJ_{156} | — | November 12, 1999 | Socorro | LINEAR | · | 1.2 km | MPC · JPL |
| 102790 | 1999 VH_{157} | — | November 14, 1999 | Socorro | LINEAR | NYS | 1.5 km | MPC · JPL |
| 102791 | 1999 VR_{157} | — | November 14, 1999 | Socorro | LINEAR | NYS | 3.2 km | MPC · JPL |
| 102792 | 1999 VN_{158} | — | November 14, 1999 | Socorro | LINEAR | · | 2.2 km | MPC · JPL |
| 102793 | 1999 VO_{158} | — | November 14, 1999 | Socorro | LINEAR | · | 2.2 km | MPC · JPL |
| 102794 | 1999 VZ_{158} | — | November 14, 1999 | Socorro | LINEAR | · | 3.3 km | MPC · JPL |
| 102795 | 1999 VA_{163} | — | November 14, 1999 | Socorro | LINEAR | · | 1.5 km | MPC · JPL |
| 102796 | 1999 VB_{163} | — | November 14, 1999 | Socorro | LINEAR | MIS | 3.9 km | MPC · JPL |
| 102797 | 1999 VE_{165} | — | November 14, 1999 | Socorro | LINEAR | · | 3.1 km | MPC · JPL |
| 102798 | 1999 VF_{165} | — | November 14, 1999 | Socorro | LINEAR | V | 1.4 km | MPC · JPL |
| 102799 | 1999 VO_{165} | — | November 14, 1999 | Socorro | LINEAR | · | 3.7 km | MPC · JPL |
| 102800 | 1999 VS_{165} | — | November 14, 1999 | Socorro | LINEAR | (2076) | 1.8 km | MPC · JPL |

== 102801–102900 ==
back to top

| Designation | | | Discovery | | | Properties | | Ref |
| Permanent | Provisional | Named after | Date | Site | Discoverer(s) | Category | Diam. | Ref |
|---|---|---|---|---|---|---|---|---|
| 102801 | 1999 VX_{166} | — | November 14, 1999 | Socorro | LINEAR | · | 2.5 km | MPC · JPL |
| 102802 | 1999 VB_{168} | — | November 14, 1999 | Socorro | LINEAR | · | 1.9 km | MPC · JPL |
| 102803 | 1999 VA_{169} | — | November 14, 1999 | Socorro | LINEAR | · | 2.0 km | MPC · JPL |
| 102804 | 1999 VJ_{170} | — | November 14, 1999 | Socorro | LINEAR | · | 2.4 km | MPC · JPL |
| 102805 | 1999 VM_{170} | — | November 14, 1999 | Socorro | LINEAR | · | 3.9 km | MPC · JPL |
| 102806 | 1999 VU_{170} | — | November 14, 1999 | Socorro | LINEAR | · | 3.0 km | MPC · JPL |
| 102807 | 1999 VE_{171} | — | November 14, 1999 | Socorro | LINEAR | MAR | 2.3 km | MPC · JPL |
| 102808 | 1999 VG_{172} | — | November 14, 1999 | Socorro | LINEAR | · | 2.7 km | MPC · JPL |
| 102809 | 1999 VT_{173} | — | November 15, 1999 | Socorro | LINEAR | · | 2.9 km | MPC · JPL |
| 102810 | 1999 VH_{174} | — | November 10, 1999 | Anderson Mesa | LONEOS | · | 6.2 km | MPC · JPL |
| 102811 | 1999 VM_{176} | — | November 4, 1999 | Socorro | LINEAR | · | 1.8 km | MPC · JPL |
| 102812 | 1999 VO_{176} | — | November 4, 1999 | Socorro | LINEAR | · | 1.9 km | MPC · JPL |
| 102813 | 1999 VE_{177} | — | November 5, 1999 | Socorro | LINEAR | · | 2.5 km | MPC · JPL |
| 102814 | 1999 VK_{177} | — | November 5, 1999 | Socorro | LINEAR | · | 3.1 km | MPC · JPL |
| 102815 | 1999 VL_{177} | — | November 5, 1999 | Socorro | LINEAR | · | 1.8 km | MPC · JPL |
| 102816 | 1999 VK_{179} | — | November 6, 1999 | Socorro | LINEAR | · | 1.2 km | MPC · JPL |
| 102817 | 1999 VE_{180} | — | November 5, 1999 | Socorro | LINEAR | RAF | 1.9 km | MPC · JPL |
| 102818 | 1999 VH_{180} | — | November 5, 1999 | Socorro | LINEAR | · | 1.8 km | MPC · JPL |
| 102819 | 1999 VJ_{181} | — | November 9, 1999 | Socorro | LINEAR | · | 1.8 km | MPC · JPL |
| 102820 | 1999 VO_{181} | — | November 9, 1999 | Socorro | LINEAR | · | 3.5 km | MPC · JPL |
| 102821 | 1999 VR_{181} | — | November 9, 1999 | Socorro | LINEAR | · | 1.3 km | MPC · JPL |
| 102822 | 1999 VD_{182} | — | November 9, 1999 | Socorro | LINEAR | CLA | 3.0 km | MPC · JPL |
| 102823 | 1999 VM_{182} | — | November 9, 1999 | Socorro | LINEAR | · | 1.8 km | MPC · JPL |
| 102824 | 1999 VU_{182} | — | November 9, 1999 | Socorro | LINEAR | · | 2.7 km | MPC · JPL |
| 102825 | 1999 VQ_{183} | — | November 12, 1999 | Socorro | LINEAR | · | 3.6 km | MPC · JPL |
| 102826 | 1999 VA_{184} | — | November 15, 1999 | Socorro | LINEAR | MAS | 1.2 km | MPC · JPL |
| 102827 | 1999 VU_{184} | — | November 15, 1999 | Socorro | LINEAR | · | 2.5 km | MPC · JPL |
| 102828 | 1999 VS_{186} | — | November 15, 1999 | Socorro | LINEAR | · | 1.9 km | MPC · JPL |
| 102829 | 1999 VK_{187} | — | November 15, 1999 | Socorro | LINEAR | · | 2.1 km | MPC · JPL |
| 102830 | 1999 VU_{187} | — | November 15, 1999 | Socorro | LINEAR | · | 1.3 km | MPC · JPL |
| 102831 | 1999 VK_{189} | — | November 15, 1999 | Socorro | LINEAR | · | 2.7 km | MPC · JPL |
| 102832 | 1999 VL_{189} | — | November 15, 1999 | Socorro | LINEAR | · | 1.5 km | MPC · JPL |
| 102833 | 1999 VU_{189} | — | November 15, 1999 | Socorro | LINEAR | · | 2.3 km | MPC · JPL |
| 102834 | 1999 VF_{190} | — | November 15, 1999 | Socorro | LINEAR | · | 1.2 km | MPC · JPL |
| 102835 | 1999 VN_{190} | — | November 15, 1999 | Socorro | LINEAR | · | 2.1 km | MPC · JPL |
| 102836 | 1999 VL_{191} | — | November 12, 1999 | Socorro | LINEAR | · | 3.4 km | MPC · JPL |
| 102837 | 1999 VE_{192} | — | November 14, 1999 | Socorro | LINEAR | EOS | 3.3 km | MPC · JPL |
| 102838 | 1999 VO_{192} | — | November 1, 1999 | Anderson Mesa | LONEOS | · | 2.7 km | MPC · JPL |
| 102839 | 1999 VY_{193} | — | November 3, 1999 | Socorro | LINEAR | · | 1.7 km | MPC · JPL |
| 102840 | 1999 VO_{194} | — | November 1, 1999 | Catalina | CSS | · | 2.3 km | MPC · JPL |
| 102841 | 1999 VT_{194} | — | November 2, 1999 | Catalina | CSS | · | 2.6 km | MPC · JPL |
| 102842 | 1999 VP_{196} | — | November 1, 1999 | Catalina | CSS | PHO | 2.1 km | MPC · JPL |
| 102843 | 1999 VZ_{197} | — | November 3, 1999 | Catalina | CSS | · | 4.8 km | MPC · JPL |
| 102844 | 1999 VM_{198} | — | November 3, 1999 | Catalina | CSS | · | 1.6 km | MPC · JPL |
| 102845 | 1999 VP_{198} | — | November 3, 1999 | Catalina | CSS | · | 4.6 km | MPC · JPL |
| 102846 | 1999 VR_{201} | — | November 3, 1999 | Socorro | LINEAR | (5) | 2.2 km | MPC · JPL |
| 102847 | 1999 VV_{202} | — | November 5, 1999 | Socorro | LINEAR | · | 5.4 km | MPC · JPL |
| 102848 | 1999 VR_{203} | — | November 9, 1999 | Anderson Mesa | LONEOS | fast | 4.7 km | MPC · JPL |
| 102849 | 1999 VT_{210} | — | November 13, 1999 | Catalina | CSS | MRX | 1.7 km | MPC · JPL |
| 102850 | 1999 VF_{211} | — | November 14, 1999 | Catalina | CSS | (5) | 2.2 km | MPC · JPL |
| 102851 | 1999 VX_{212} | — | November 12, 1999 | Anderson Mesa | LONEOS | · | 2.8 km | MPC · JPL |
| 102852 | 1999 VG_{213} | — | November 12, 1999 | Socorro | LINEAR | · | 1.5 km | MPC · JPL |
| 102853 | 1999 VU_{217} | — | November 5, 1999 | Socorro | LINEAR | · | 2.2 km | MPC · JPL |
| 102854 | 1999 VN_{220} | — | November 3, 1999 | Socorro | LINEAR | · | 2.5 km | MPC · JPL |
| 102855 | 1999 VM_{223} | — | November 5, 1999 | Socorro | LINEAR | V | 1.2 km | MPC · JPL |
| 102856 | 1999 VQ_{223} | — | November 5, 1999 | Socorro | LINEAR | · | 6.8 km | MPC · JPL |
| 102857 | 1999 VG_{224} | — | November 5, 1999 | Socorro | LINEAR | · | 2.4 km | MPC · JPL |
| 102858 | 1999 VY_{225} | — | November 5, 1999 | Socorro | LINEAR | (5) | 1.8 km | MPC · JPL |
| 102859 | 1999 WH_{1} | — | November 28, 1999 | Kleť | Kleť | · | 1.7 km | MPC · JPL |
| 102860 | 1999 WJ_{1} | — | November 28, 1999 | Kleť | Kleť | · | 1.8 km | MPC · JPL |
| 102861 | 1999 WZ_{2} | — | November 27, 1999 | Višnjan Observatory | K. Korlević | · | 2.3 km | MPC · JPL |
| 102862 | 1999 WB_{3} | — | November 27, 1999 | Višnjan Observatory | K. Korlević | · | 1.9 km | MPC · JPL |
| 102863 | 1999 WL_{3} | — | November 28, 1999 | Oizumi | T. Kobayashi | · | 3.6 km | MPC · JPL |
| 102864 | 1999 WA_{4} | — | November 28, 1999 | Oizumi | T. Kobayashi | NYS | 2.4 km | MPC · JPL |
| 102865 | 1999 WD_{4} | — | November 28, 1999 | Oizumi | T. Kobayashi | · | 4.2 km | MPC · JPL |
| 102866 | 1999 WA_{5} | — | November 28, 1999 | Oizumi | T. Kobayashi | · | 2.2 km | MPC · JPL |
| 102867 | 1999 WE_{5} | — | November 30, 1999 | Kleť | Kleť | · | 2.5 km | MPC · JPL |
| 102868 | 1999 WO_{6} | — | November 28, 1999 | Višnjan Observatory | K. Korlević | (18466) | 4.2 km | MPC · JPL |
| 102869 | 1999 WN_{10} | — | November 28, 1999 | Kitt Peak | Spacewatch | EOS | 3.5 km | MPC · JPL |
| 102870 | 1999 WZ_{10} | — | November 30, 1999 | Kitt Peak | Spacewatch | · | 1.5 km | MPC · JPL |
| 102871 | 1999 WB_{11} | — | November 30, 1999 | Kitt Peak | Spacewatch | NYS | 1.9 km | MPC · JPL |
| 102872 | 1999 WE_{11} | — | November 30, 1999 | Kitt Peak | Spacewatch | · | 3.6 km | MPC · JPL |
| 102873 | 1999 WK_{11} | — | November 30, 1999 | Kitt Peak | Spacewatch | AMO +1km | 1.1 km | MPC · JPL |
| 102874 | 1999 WA_{12} | — | November 28, 1999 | Kitt Peak | Spacewatch | AGN | 3.2 km | MPC · JPL |
| 102875 | 1999 WB_{12} | — | November 28, 1999 | Kitt Peak | Spacewatch | · | 2.3 km | MPC · JPL |
| 102876 | 1999 WL_{12} | — | November 29, 1999 | Kitt Peak | Spacewatch | · | 2.0 km | MPC · JPL |
| 102877 | 1999 WV_{13} | — | November 28, 1999 | Kitt Peak | Spacewatch | · | 2.2 km | MPC · JPL |
| 102878 | 1999 WZ_{14} | — | November 29, 1999 | Kitt Peak | Spacewatch | · | 1.8 km | MPC · JPL |
| 102879 | 1999 WP_{15} | — | November 29, 1999 | Kitt Peak | Spacewatch | · | 1.8 km | MPC · JPL |
| 102880 | 1999 WA_{18} | — | November 30, 1999 | Kitt Peak | Spacewatch | · | 2.1 km | MPC · JPL |
| 102881 | 1999 WE_{18} | — | November 30, 1999 | Kitt Peak | Spacewatch | · | 1.3 km | MPC · JPL |
| 102882 | 1999 WX_{19} | — | November 17, 1999 | Anderson Mesa | LONEOS | (5) | 2.3 km | MPC · JPL |
| 102883 | 1999 WA_{20} | — | November 16, 1999 | Catalina | CSS | · | 2.5 km | MPC · JPL |
| 102884 | 1999 XQ_{1} | — | December 2, 1999 | Socorro | LINEAR | (5) | 2.5 km | MPC · JPL |
| 102885 | 1999 XX_{1} | — | December 3, 1999 | Fountain Hills | C. W. Juels | ERI | 4.6 km | MPC · JPL |
| 102886 | 1999 XG_{4} | — | December 4, 1999 | Catalina | CSS | · | 1.2 km | MPC · JPL |
| 102887 | 1999 XM_{4} | — | December 4, 1999 | Catalina | CSS | NYS | 2.1 km | MPC · JPL |
| 102888 | 1999 XV_{4} | — | December 4, 1999 | Catalina | CSS | · | 1.9 km | MPC · JPL |
| 102889 | 1999 XL_{5} | — | December 4, 1999 | Catalina | CSS | · | 2.1 km | MPC · JPL |
| 102890 | 1999 XV_{5} | — | December 4, 1999 | Catalina | CSS | · | 2.5 km | MPC · JPL |
| 102891 | 1999 XK_{6} | — | December 4, 1999 | Catalina | CSS | NYS | 2.0 km | MPC · JPL |
| 102892 | 1999 XY_{6} | — | December 4, 1999 | Catalina | CSS | · | 3.2 km | MPC · JPL |
| 102893 | 1999 XF_{7} | — | December 4, 1999 | Catalina | CSS | · | 2.3 km | MPC · JPL |
| 102894 | 1999 XV_{8} | — | December 5, 1999 | Socorro | LINEAR | · | 2.9 km | MPC · JPL |
| 102895 | 1999 XY_{9} | — | December 5, 1999 | Kitt Peak | Spacewatch | (5) | 1.9 km | MPC · JPL |
| 102896 | 1999 XD_{10} | — | December 5, 1999 | Kitt Peak | Spacewatch | · | 2.2 km | MPC · JPL |
| 102897 | 1999 XA_{11} | — | December 5, 1999 | Catalina | CSS | · | 3.3 km | MPC · JPL |
| 102898 | 1999 XD_{11} | — | December 5, 1999 | Catalina | CSS | V | 1.8 km | MPC · JPL |
| 102899 | 1999 XN_{11} | — | December 5, 1999 | Catalina | CSS | · | 2.4 km | MPC · JPL |
| 102900 | 1999 XX_{12} | — | December 5, 1999 | Socorro | LINEAR | · | 4.0 km | MPC · JPL |

== 102901–103000 ==
back to top

| Designation | | | Discovery | | | Properties | | Ref |
| Permanent | Provisional | Named after | Date | Site | Discoverer(s) | Category | Diam. | Ref |
|---|---|---|---|---|---|---|---|---|
| 102901 | 1999 XU_{14} | — | December 6, 1999 | Socorro | LINEAR | HNS | 2.3 km | MPC · JPL |
| 102902 | 1999 XD_{15} | — | December 6, 1999 | Socorro | LINEAR | PHO | 2.7 km | MPC · JPL |
| 102903 | 1999 XK_{15} | — | December 5, 1999 | Višnjan Observatory | K. Korlević | · | 2.9 km | MPC · JPL |
| 102904 | 1999 XF_{16} | — | December 6, 1999 | Socorro | LINEAR | · | 4.1 km | MPC · JPL |
| 102905 | 1999 XV_{16} | — | December 7, 1999 | Socorro | LINEAR | · | 1.6 km | MPC · JPL |
| 102906 | 1999 XJ_{18} | — | December 3, 1999 | Socorro | LINEAR | NYS · | 4.9 km | MPC · JPL |
| 102907 | 1999 XZ_{18} | — | December 3, 1999 | Socorro | LINEAR | PHO | 2.5 km | MPC · JPL |
| 102908 | 1999 XO_{19} | — | December 5, 1999 | Socorro | LINEAR | · | 2.2 km | MPC · JPL |
| 102909 | 1999 XR_{19} | — | December 5, 1999 | Socorro | LINEAR | · | 2.2 km | MPC · JPL |
| 102910 | 1999 XT_{19} | — | December 5, 1999 | Socorro | LINEAR | · | 2.1 km | MPC · JPL |
| 102911 | 1999 XZ_{19} | — | December 5, 1999 | Socorro | LINEAR | NYS · | 4.1 km | MPC · JPL |
| 102912 | 1999 XA_{21} | — | December 5, 1999 | Socorro | LINEAR | · | 2.6 km | MPC · JPL |
| 102913 | 1999 XT_{21} | — | December 5, 1999 | Socorro | LINEAR | · | 2.4 km | MPC · JPL |
| 102914 | 1999 XT_{22} | — | December 6, 1999 | Socorro | LINEAR | · | 2.7 km | MPC · JPL |
| 102915 | 1999 XT_{23} | — | December 6, 1999 | Socorro | LINEAR | (11097) · CYB · 2:1J | 8.1 km | MPC · JPL |
| 102916 | 1999 XG_{24} | — | December 6, 1999 | Socorro | LINEAR | PHO | 2.7 km | MPC · JPL |
| 102917 | 1999 XK_{24} | — | December 12, 1999 | Socorro | LINEAR | · | 2.4 km | MPC · JPL |
| 102918 | 1999 XW_{24} | — | December 6, 1999 | Socorro | LINEAR | · | 2.3 km | MPC · JPL |
| 102919 | 1999 XC_{26} | — | December 6, 1999 | Socorro | LINEAR | · | 1.7 km | MPC · JPL |
| 102920 | 1999 XC_{27} | — | December 6, 1999 | Socorro | LINEAR | · | 4.4 km | MPC · JPL |
| 102921 | 1999 XH_{27} | — | December 6, 1999 | Socorro | LINEAR | · | 3.4 km | MPC · JPL |
| 102922 | 1999 XA_{30} | — | December 6, 1999 | Socorro | LINEAR | · | 3.3 km | MPC · JPL |
| 102923 | 1999 XX_{30} | — | December 6, 1999 | Socorro | LINEAR | (5) | 2.3 km | MPC · JPL |
| 102924 | 1999 XZ_{30} | — | December 6, 1999 | Socorro | LINEAR | · | 2.7 km | MPC · JPL |
| 102925 | 1999 XZ_{32} | — | December 6, 1999 | Socorro | LINEAR | · | 3.5 km | MPC · JPL |
| 102926 | 1999 XH_{34} | — | December 6, 1999 | Socorro | LINEAR | · | 6.1 km | MPC · JPL |
| 102927 | 1999 XX_{35} | — | December 6, 1999 | Oizumi | T. Kobayashi | NYS | 3.2 km | MPC · JPL |
| 102928 | 1999 XU_{36} | — | December 7, 1999 | Fountain Hills | C. W. Juels | · | 4.0 km | MPC · JPL |
| 102929 | 1999 XQ_{37} | — | December 7, 1999 | Blauvac | R. Roy | · | 3.9 km | MPC · JPL |
| 102930 | 1999 XO_{40} | — | December 7, 1999 | Socorro | LINEAR | · | 2.6 km | MPC · JPL |
| 102931 | 1999 XE_{41} | — | December 7, 1999 | Socorro | LINEAR | NYS | 1.5 km | MPC · JPL |
| 102932 | 1999 XH_{41} | — | December 7, 1999 | Socorro | LINEAR | NYS | 1.9 km | MPC · JPL |
| 102933 | 1999 XV_{41} | — | December 7, 1999 | Socorro | LINEAR | · | 2.2 km | MPC · JPL |
| 102934 | 1999 XY_{42} | — | December 7, 1999 | Socorro | LINEAR | HNS | 3.0 km | MPC · JPL |
| 102935 | 1999 XK_{43} | — | December 7, 1999 | Socorro | LINEAR | · | 3.1 km | MPC · JPL |
| 102936 | 1999 XH_{44} | — | December 7, 1999 | Socorro | LINEAR | · | 5.6 km | MPC · JPL |
| 102937 | 1999 XS_{46} | — | December 7, 1999 | Socorro | LINEAR | · | 2.1 km | MPC · JPL |
| 102938 | 1999 XU_{47} | — | December 7, 1999 | Socorro | LINEAR | NYS | 2.2 km | MPC · JPL |
| 102939 | 1999 XV_{47} | — | December 7, 1999 | Socorro | LINEAR | · | 3.3 km | MPC · JPL |
| 102940 | 1999 XY_{49} | — | December 7, 1999 | Socorro | LINEAR | · | 1.3 km | MPC · JPL |
| 102941 | 1999 XF_{50} | — | December 7, 1999 | Socorro | LINEAR | · | 3.1 km | MPC · JPL |
| 102942 | 1999 XX_{50} | — | December 7, 1999 | Socorro | LINEAR | · | 2.0 km | MPC · JPL |
| 102943 | 1999 XY_{51} | — | December 7, 1999 | Socorro | LINEAR | · | 4.4 km | MPC · JPL |
| 102944 | 1999 XE_{52} | — | December 7, 1999 | Socorro | LINEAR | · | 4.4 km | MPC · JPL |
| 102945 | 1999 XT_{52} | — | December 7, 1999 | Socorro | LINEAR | · | 1.6 km | MPC · JPL |
| 102946 | 1999 XM_{53} | — | December 7, 1999 | Socorro | LINEAR | · | 5.3 km | MPC · JPL |
| 102947 | 1999 XS_{53} | — | December 7, 1999 | Socorro | LINEAR | · | 2.0 km | MPC · JPL |
| 102948 | 1999 XU_{54} | — | December 7, 1999 | Socorro | LINEAR | · | 1.2 km | MPC · JPL |
| 102949 | 1999 XB_{56} | — | December 7, 1999 | Socorro | LINEAR | PAD | 4.4 km | MPC · JPL |
| 102950 | 1999 XF_{56} | — | December 7, 1999 | Socorro | LINEAR | · | 2.6 km | MPC · JPL |
| 102951 | 1999 XG_{56} | — | December 7, 1999 | Socorro | LINEAR | · | 3.6 km | MPC · JPL |
| 102952 | 1999 XB_{58} | — | December 7, 1999 | Socorro | LINEAR | MRX | 1.9 km | MPC · JPL |
| 102953 | 1999 XR_{58} | — | December 7, 1999 | Socorro | LINEAR | · | 1.9 km | MPC · JPL |
| 102954 | 1999 XX_{58} | — | December 7, 1999 | Socorro | LINEAR | · | 1.5 km | MPC · JPL |
| 102955 | 1999 XZ_{59} | — | December 7, 1999 | Socorro | LINEAR | MAR | 1.8 km | MPC · JPL |
| 102956 | 1999 XH_{61} | — | December 7, 1999 | Socorro | LINEAR | (5) | 2.6 km | MPC · JPL |
| 102957 | 1999 XK_{62} | — | December 7, 1999 | Socorro | LINEAR | (5) | 2.2 km | MPC · JPL |
| 102958 | 1999 XT_{63} | — | December 7, 1999 | Socorro | LINEAR | · | 2.3 km | MPC · JPL |
| 102959 | 1999 XX_{64} | — | December 7, 1999 | Socorro | LINEAR | MAS | 1.2 km | MPC · JPL |
| 102960 | 1999 XV_{65} | — | December 7, 1999 | Socorro | LINEAR | · | 2.0 km | MPC · JPL |
| 102961 | 1999 XZ_{65} | — | December 7, 1999 | Socorro | LINEAR | MAS | 1.4 km | MPC · JPL |
| 102962 | 1999 XB_{66} | — | December 7, 1999 | Socorro | LINEAR | · | 3.0 km | MPC · JPL |
| 102963 | 1999 XU_{66} | — | December 7, 1999 | Socorro | LINEAR | · | 2.4 km | MPC · JPL |
| 102964 | 1999 XW_{66} | — | December 7, 1999 | Socorro | LINEAR | · | 3.2 km | MPC · JPL |
| 102965 | 1999 XH_{67} | — | December 7, 1999 | Socorro | LINEAR | (6769) | 1.6 km | MPC · JPL |
| 102966 | 1999 XO_{67} | — | December 7, 1999 | Socorro | LINEAR | NYS | 1.7 km | MPC · JPL |
| 102967 | 1999 XF_{69} | — | December 7, 1999 | Socorro | LINEAR | · | 2.0 km | MPC · JPL |
| 102968 | 1999 XW_{69} | — | December 7, 1999 | Socorro | LINEAR | · | 2.9 km | MPC · JPL |
| 102969 | 1999 XB_{71} | — | December 7, 1999 | Socorro | LINEAR | · | 2.4 km | MPC · JPL |
| 102970 | 1999 XG_{71} | — | December 7, 1999 | Socorro | LINEAR | (5) | 1.8 km | MPC · JPL |
| 102971 | 1999 XP_{72} | — | December 7, 1999 | Socorro | LINEAR | · | 3.3 km | MPC · JPL |
| 102972 | 1999 XP_{74} | — | December 7, 1999 | Socorro | LINEAR | KON | 4.6 km | MPC · JPL |
| 102973 | 1999 XT_{74} | — | December 7, 1999 | Socorro | LINEAR | · | 2.6 km | MPC · JPL |
| 102974 | 1999 XQ_{75} | — | December 7, 1999 | Socorro | LINEAR | · | 2.5 km | MPC · JPL |
| 102975 | 1999 XF_{76} | — | December 7, 1999 | Socorro | LINEAR | · | 3.3 km | MPC · JPL |
| 102976 | 1999 XG_{76} | — | December 7, 1999 | Socorro | LINEAR | · | 1.8 km | MPC · JPL |
| 102977 | 1999 XV_{76} | — | December 7, 1999 | Socorro | LINEAR | · | 1.9 km | MPC · JPL |
| 102978 | 1999 XD_{77} | — | December 7, 1999 | Socorro | LINEAR | V | 1.5 km | MPC · JPL |
| 102979 | 1999 XV_{77} | — | December 7, 1999 | Socorro | LINEAR | · | 1.8 km | MPC · JPL |
| 102980 | 1999 XA_{78} | — | December 7, 1999 | Socorro | LINEAR | · | 2.1 km | MPC · JPL |
| 102981 | 1999 XC_{78} | — | December 7, 1999 | Socorro | LINEAR | · | 1.7 km | MPC · JPL |
| 102982 | 1999 XR_{79} | — | December 7, 1999 | Socorro | LINEAR | · | 1.6 km | MPC · JPL |
| 102983 | 1999 XA_{80} | — | December 7, 1999 | Socorro | LINEAR | · | 2.5 km | MPC · JPL |
| 102984 | 1999 XJ_{81} | — | December 7, 1999 | Socorro | LINEAR | · | 2.4 km | MPC · JPL |
| 102985 | 1999 XZ_{81} | — | December 7, 1999 | Socorro | LINEAR | · | 1.6 km | MPC · JPL |
| 102986 | 1999 XD_{82} | — | December 7, 1999 | Socorro | LINEAR | · | 1.5 km | MPC · JPL |
| 102987 | 1999 XM_{87} | — | December 7, 1999 | Socorro | LINEAR | · | 1.4 km | MPC · JPL |
| 102988 | 1999 XC_{88} | — | December 7, 1999 | Socorro | LINEAR | · | 4.5 km | MPC · JPL |
| 102989 | 1999 XD_{88} | — | December 7, 1999 | Socorro | LINEAR | JUN | 1.8 km | MPC · JPL |
| 102990 | 1999 XF_{88} | — | December 7, 1999 | Socorro | LINEAR | · | 1.4 km | MPC · JPL |
| 102991 | 1999 XF_{90} | — | December 7, 1999 | Socorro | LINEAR | V | 1.7 km | MPC · JPL |
| 102992 | 1999 XP_{90} | — | December 7, 1999 | Socorro | LINEAR | · | 3.2 km | MPC · JPL |
| 102993 | 1999 XL_{91} | — | December 7, 1999 | Socorro | LINEAR | · | 4.2 km | MPC · JPL |
| 102994 | 1999 XG_{92} | — | December 7, 1999 | Socorro | LINEAR | NYS | 2.6 km | MPC · JPL |
| 102995 | 1999 XN_{92} | — | December 7, 1999 | Socorro | LINEAR | V | 1.4 km | MPC · JPL |
| 102996 | 1999 XV_{92} | — | December 7, 1999 | Socorro | LINEAR | · | 3.4 km | MPC · JPL |
| 102997 | 1999 XF_{94} | — | December 7, 1999 | Socorro | LINEAR | · | 2.7 km | MPC · JPL |
| 102998 | 1999 XJ_{94} | — | December 7, 1999 | Socorro | LINEAR | EUN | 3.3 km | MPC · JPL |
| 102999 | 1999 XP_{95} | — | December 7, 1999 | Oizumi | T. Kobayashi | · | 5.2 km | MPC · JPL |
| 103000 | 1999 XT_{95} | — | December 9, 1999 | Oizumi | T. Kobayashi | ADE | 5.2 km | MPC · JPL |

back to top

== See also ==
- Meanings of minor-planet names: 102001–103000
