= Meanings of minor-planet names: 102001–103000 =

As minor planet discoveries are confirmed, they are given a permanent number by the IAU's Minor Planet Center (MPC), and the discoverers can then submit names for them, following the IAU's naming conventions. The list below concerns those minor planets in the specified number-range that have received names, and explains the meanings of those names.

Official naming citations of newly named small Solar System bodies are approved and published in a bulletin by IAU's Working Group for Small Bodies Nomenclature (WGSBN). Before May 2021, citations were published in MPC's Minor Planet Circulars for many decades. Recent citations can also be found on the JPL Small-Body Database (SBDB). Until his death in 2016, German astronomer Lutz D. Schmadel compiled these citations into the Dictionary of Minor Planet Names (DMP) and regularly updated the collection.

Based on Paul Herget's The Names of the Minor Planets, Schmadel also researched the unclear origin of numerous asteroids, most of which had been named prior to World War II. This article incorporates text from this source, which is in the public domain: SBDB New namings may only be added to this list below after official publication as the preannouncement of names is condemned. The WGSBN publishes a comprehensive guideline for the naming rules of non-cometary small Solar System bodies.

== 102001–102100 ==
Named minor planet	Provisional	This minor planet was named for...	Ref · Catalog
There are no named minor planets in this number range

== 102101–102200 ==
back to top

Named minor planet	Provisional	This minor planet was named for...	Ref · Catalog
There are no named minor planets in this number range

== 102201–102300 ==
back to top

Named minor planet	Provisional	This minor planet was named for...	Ref · Catalog
102211 Angelofaggiano	1999 TQ	Angelo Faggiano (1934–2017), an Italian publisher.	JPL · 102211
102216 Carona	1999 TG_{4}	Don Carona, American astronomer at Texas A&M University.	IAU · 102216
102224 Raffaellolena	1999 TG_{12}	Raffaello Lena (born 1959) is an Italian lunar observer. He founded Selenology Today, a journal that has produced high quality amateur lunar studies. He is the Lunar Domes Coordinator of the British Astronomical Association.	JPL · 102224
102234 Olivebyrne	1999 TK_{20}	Olive Byrne (1904–1990) was an American housewife and the research assistant and live-in mistress of William Moulton Marston (who was married to Elizabeth Holloway Marston). She, along with his wife, was the inspiration for his comic book creation Wonder Woman.	JPL · 102234

== 102301–102400 ==
back to top

Named minor planet	Provisional	This minor planet was named for...	Ref · Catalog
There are no named minor planets in this number range

== 102401–102500 ==
back to top

Named minor planet	Provisional	This minor planet was named for...	Ref · Catalog
There are no named minor planets in this number range

== 102501–102600 ==
back to top

Named minor planet	Provisional	This minor planet was named for...	Ref · Catalog
102536 Luanenjie	1999 UN_{6}	Luan Enjie (born 1940), an Academician of the National Academy of Engineering of China and an Academician of the International Academy of Astronautics.	JPL · 102536

== 102601–102700 ==
back to top

Named minor planet	Provisional	This minor planet was named for...	Ref · Catalog
102617 Allium	1999 VC_{23}	Allium is a plant that has been used worldwide for millennia. Among a multitude of varieties, A. sativum is the common cultivated sort and can be found almost yearlong, but in spring, in Gnosca and surrounding areas, people harvest and eat the delicious A. ursinum.	IAU · 102617
102618 Marionacaldentey	1999 VJ_{23}	Maria Francesca Caldentey Oliver (b. 1996), better known as Mariona Caldentey, Spanish footballer.	IAU · 102618
102619 Crespino	1999 VK_{23}	Berberis, also known as barberry (in Italian, "crespino"), is a deciduous shrub with three-branched spines. This plant is easily found around the observatory.	IAU · 102619
102621 Goshinosato	1999 VO_{25}	"Goshi no sato" is the nickname for the town of Saji, where the Saji Observatory is located, in Tottori city, Japan.	IAU · 102621

== 102701–102800 ==
back to top

Named minor planet	Provisional	This minor planet was named for...	Ref · Catalog
There are no named minor planets in this number range

== 102801–102900 ==
back to top

Named minor planet	Provisional	This minor planet was named for...	Ref · Catalog
There are no named minor planets in this number range

== 102901–103000 ==
back to top

Named minor planet	Provisional	This minor planet was named for...	Ref · Catalog
There are no named minor planets in this number range

back to top

Preceded by 101,001–102,000	Meanings of minor-planet names List of minor planets: 102,001–103,000	Succeeded by 103,001–104,000
