= Red Sonja (disambiguation) =

Red Sonja is a Marvel Comics character.

Red Sonja may also refer to :

- Red Sonja (1985 film), an American sword and sorcery film
- Red Sonja (2025 film), an American sword and sorcery film
- Red Sonja: Consumed, a 2024 novel by Gail Simone
- Red Sonja: Queen of Plagues, a 2016 American sword and sorcery animated film
- Red Sonya of Rogatino, a character in the short story "The Shadow of the Vulture" by Robert E. Howard
- Ursula Kuczynski (1907–2000), German communist spy codenamed "Sonja"

== See also ==
- Red Sonja Unconquered, a 1986 adventure module for the role-playing game Dungeons & Dragons
