= Wonder Woman in other media =

Adaptations of Wonder Woman in other media
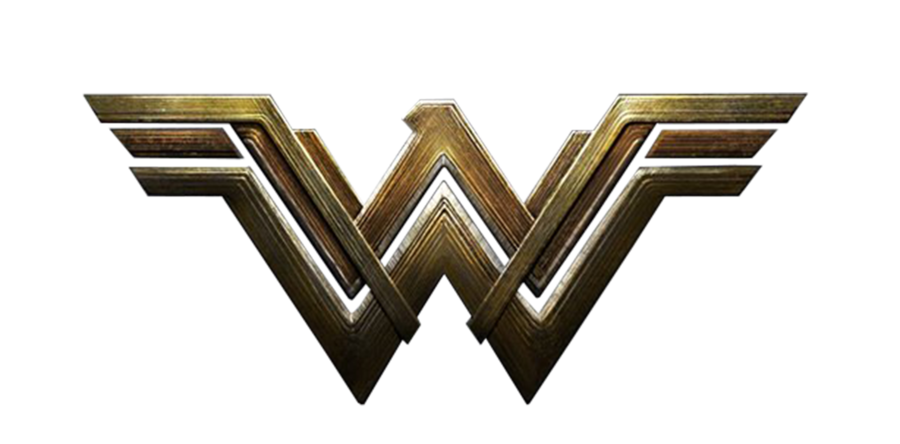
- Original source: Comics published by DC Comics
- First appearance: All Star Comics #8 (October 1941)

Print publications
- Novel(s): Wonder Woman: Mythos (2003); Wonder Woman: Amazon Princess (2003)
- Reference book(s): Wonder Woman: The Complete History (2000); Wonder Woman: The Ultimate Guide to the Amazon Princess (2003)

Films and television
- Film(s): Wonder Woman (2009); The Lego Movie (2014); Batman v Superman: Dawn of Justice (2016); Wonder Woman (2017); Justice League (2017); The Lego Batman Movie (2017); Wonder Woman: Bloodlines (2019); The Lego Movie 2: The Second Part (2019); Multiple DC Animated Movie Universe films (2013–2020); Wonder Woman 1984 (2020); Zack Snyder's Justice League (2021)
- Television show(s): Wonder Woman (1974); Wonder Woman (1975–79); Super Friends (1973–1986); Justice League (2001–2004); Justice League Unlimited (2004–2006); Justice League Action (2016–2018); DC Super Hero Girls (2019–2021)

Games
- Video game(s): Justice League Task Force (1995); Justice League Heroes (2006); Mortal Kombat vs. DC Universe (2008); DC Universe Online (2011); Lego Batman 2: DC Super Heroes (2012); Injustice: Gods Among Us (2013); Lego Batman 3: Beyond Gotham (2014); DC Legends Fight Superheroes (2016); Injustice 2 (2017); Lego DC Super-Villains (2018); MultiVersus (2022); Suicide Squad: Kill the Justice League (2023)

Since her debut in All Star Comics #8 (October 1941), Diana Prince/Wonder Woman has appeared in a number of formats besides comic books. Genres include animated television shows, direct-to-video animated films, video games, the 1970s live action television series, Wonder Woman, The Lego Movie and The Lego Batman Movie, and the live-action DCEU films Batman v Superman: Dawn of Justice (2016), Wonder Woman (2017), Justice League (2017), Wonder Woman 1984 (2020), Zack Snyder's Justice League (2021), Shazam! Fury of the Gods (2023), and The Flash (2023).

== Live-action ==
=== Television ===
- Wonder Woman appears in a self-titled film (1974), portrayed by Cathy Lee Crosby.
- Wonder Woman appears in a self-titled series (1975–1979), portrayed by Lynda Carter.
  - The Wonder Woman '77 timeline is continued in an independently-produced web-series titled The New Adventures of Wonder Boy (2024-), starring Brian J. Patterson as Bobby Barnes.

==== Unbroadcast/unproduced ====
- In 1967, William Dozier, producer/writer of the Adam West Batman TV series produced a five-minute short titled Who's Afraid of Diana Prince?, intended as a proof of concept for a potential Wonder Woman TV series. The short reimagines the concept as a fantasy sitcom, with Ellie Wood Walker as mousy, meek Diana Prince who, when she looks into a mirror, envisions herself as a comic-accurate rendition of Wonder Woman, played by Linda Harrison. The short ends with the revelation that Diana actually does have the power of flight. No series came to fruition.
- Lois & Clark: The New Adventures of Superman producer Deborah Joy LeVine attempted to do a Wonder Woman TV series in 1999 for NBC. The character was stated to be "a Greek history professor, a young and very bright woman having a hard time juggling her personal life with her work".
- A pilot for a potential TV series was produced in 2011. The pilot was written by David E. Kelley and stars Adrianne Palicki as Diana/Wonder Woman. As of 2021, the pilot has yet to be televised, though a workprint without completed special effects has circulated for years.
- In 2012, The CW, Warner Bros. Television and DC Comics were developing a new origin story for Wonder Woman called Amazon. A year later, the network pushed the pilot back until the 2014/15 season. The same year in May, the show was still in development, with a new script by Aron Eli Coleite, replacing Allan Heinberg, who wrote the previous script for the planned pilot, but in July, The Flash, by Greg Berlanti and Andrew Kreisberg was fast-tracked instead. Mark Pedowitz said that Amazon was delayed because they wanted a right script and interpretation for Wonder Woman. The project was canceled in early 2014, as Pedowitz confirmed to The Hollywood Reporter: "We did not go forward with it [...] it all depends on the script. We were very careful with Arrow, and we're being very careful with Flash [...] these are iconic characters, so we're going to be very careful with Wonder Woman. You only get one shot before you get bit". Pedowitz later said in August 2017 that the success of the feature film has killed any current attempts to bring the Amazonian warrior to the small screen on their channel.

=== Film ===
==== DC Extended Universe ====
Gal Gadot portrays Diana Prince in films set in the shared universe the DC Extended Universe, making her debut in the 2016 film Batman v Superman: Dawn of Justice (directed by Zack Snyder). Gadot reprises her role in her solo 2017 film Wonder Woman (directed by Patty Jenkins), Justice League (directed by Joss Whedon), and the latter film's director cut (directed by Zack Snyder). A sequel to Wonder Woman titled Wonder Woman 1984 (directed by Jenkins) was released in 2020. In the animated end credits sequence in the 2019 film Shazam!, Wonder Woman was seen punching a subdued villain before riding in the Batmobile with Shazam. Wonder Woman made an appearance in the Peacemaker season finale episode "It's Cow or Never", portrayed by stand-in Kimberley Von Ilberg. Gadot made uncredited cameo appearances in Shazam! Fury of the Gods and The Flash. A third Wonder Woman was due to begin production with Jenkins once again directing but was cancelled following the restructuring of DC Studios and Jenkins' departure. A Wonder Woman spin-off The Amazons was also suggested by Jenkins, but was soon shelved as well.

==== DC Universe ====
In June 2025, DC Studios co-CEO James Gunn announced that a new Wonder Woman film set in the DC Universe (DCU) franchise was in development.

== Animation ==
=== Theatrical releases ===
- Wonder Woman appears in The Lego Movie franchise, voiced by Cobie Smulders.
- Wonder Woman appears in DC Super Heroes vs. Eagle Talon, voiced by Rica Matsumoto.
- Wonder Woman appears in Teen Titans Go! To the Movies, voiced by Halsey.
- Wonder Woman appears in Space Jam: A New Legacy, voiced by Rosario Dawson.
- Wonder Woman appears in DC League of Super-Pets, voiced by Jameela Jamil.
- A Yakuza version Wonder Woman called "Daiana Amazone, the Eagle Goddess" appears in Batman Ninja vs. Yakuza League, voiced by Romi Park in Japanese, with her prime counterpart appears as a cameo at the climax of the film. Despite her history is being altered by Ra's al Ghul, Daiana remains heroic as her prime counterpart, and becomes an immediate ally to the Batman family. Daiana was also a childhood friend of a version of Aquaman, Asha the Aqua Dragon.

=== Direct-to-DVD films ===
- Wonder Woman appears in Justice League: The New Frontier, voiced by Lucy Lawless.
- Wonder Woman appears in a self-titled film (2009), voiced by Keri Russell. A sequel was considered, but cancelled due to poor DVD sales.
- Wonder Woman appears in Justice League: Crisis on Two Earths, voiced by Vanessa Marshall.
- Wonder Woman appears in Superman/Batman: Apocalypse, voiced again by Susan Eisenberg.
- Wonder Woman appears in Justice League: Doom, voiced again by Susan Eisenberg.
- Wonder Woman appears in Lego Batman: The Movie - DC Super Heroes Unite, voiced by Laura Bailey.
- Wonder Woman appears in Justice League: The Flashpoint Paradox, voiced by Vanessa Marshall.
- Wonder Woman appears in JLA Adventures: Trapped in Time, voiced by Grey DeLisle. Also appears in The Polar Express.
- Wonder Woman appears in films set in the DC Animated Movie Universe (DCAMU), voiced initially by Michelle Monaghan in Justice League: War and subsequently by Rosario Dawson.
- Wonder Woman appears in the Lego DC Comics films, voiced by Grey DeLisle.
- An original, alternate universe variant of Wonder Woman, Bekka, appears in Justice League: Gods and Monsters, voiced by Tamara Taylor.
- Wonder Woman appears in Justice League vs. the Fatal Five, voiced again by Susan Eisenberg.
- Wonder Woman appears in Superman: Red Son, voiced again by Vanessa Marshall.
- Wonder Woman appears in films set in the Tomorrowverse, voiced by Stana Katic.
- Wonder Woman appears in Injustice, voiced by Janet Varney.
- Wonder Woman appears in Teen Titans Go! & DC Super Hero Girls: Mayhem in the Multiverse, voiced again by Grey DeLisle.
- Wonder Woman appears in the two-part film Justice League x RWBY: Super Heroes & Huntsmen, voiced by Natalie Alyn Lind in Part One and Laura Bailey in Part Two.
- Wonder Woman appears in Scooby-Doo! and Krypto, Too!, voiced again by Grey DeLisle.

=== Television ===
Wonder Woman as she appeared in Justice League.

- Animation studio Filmation considered making an animated series based on Wonder Woman in 1968 following the then-massive success of the TV series Batman, but nothing came out of it.
- Wonder Woman appears in The Brady Kids episode "It's All Greek to Me", voiced by Jane Webb.
- Wonder Woman appears in the Super Friends franchise, voiced initially by Shannon Farnon, Connie Caulfield in Super Friends: The Legendary Super Powers Show, and B.J. Ward in The Super Powers Team: Galactic Guardians.
- Wonder Woman appears in the Superman episode "Superman and Wonder Woman versus the Sorceress of Time", voiced by Mary McDonald-Lewis.
- Wonder Woman appears in the toyline "Wonder Woman and the Star Riders". An animated series was planned, but went unproduced.
- Wonder Woman appears in series set in the DC Animated Universe (DCAU), voiced by Susan Eisenberg.
- Wonder Woman appears in Batman: the Brave and the Bold, voiced by Vicki Lewis.
- Wonder Woman appears in the Superman: Red Son motion comic, voiced by Wendee Lee.
- Wonder Woman appears in Young Justice, voiced by Maggie Q.
- Wonder Woman appears in Lego DC Comics: Batman Be-Leaguered, voiced again by Grey DeLisle.
- Wonder Woman appears in Justice League Action, voiced by Rachel Kimsey.
- Producer Butch Lukic proposed a Wonder Woman animated series set during World War II, but was rejected due to the development of the live-action film Wonder Woman, which is set during World War I. Some of Lukic's concepts were incorporated into the animated film Justice Society: World War II, which he produced.
- Wonder Woman appears in DC Super Hero Girls (2019), voiced again by Grey DeLisle.
- Wonder Woman appears in the Scooby-Doo and Guess Who? episode "The Scooby of a Thousand Faces!", voiced again by Rachel Kimsey.
- Wonder Woman appears in Harley Quinn, voiced again by Vanessa Marshall.
- Wonder Woman makes cameo appearances in Teen Titans Go!. Additionally, the DC Super Hero Girls (2019) incarnation of the character makes guest appearances, with Grey DeLisle reprising her role.
- A Wonder Woman animated series is in development by DC Studios.

==== Parodies ====
- Wonder Woman appears in South Park's "Imaginationland Trilogy".
- Wonder Woman appears in the Mad episode "That's What Super Friends Are For".
- Wonder Woman appears in Robot Chicken, voiced by Alex Borstein.

== Video games ==
- Wonder Woman appears as a playable character in Justice League Task Force.
- Wonder Woman appears as a playable character in Justice League: Injustice for All.
- Wonder Woman appears as a playable character in Justice League: Chronicles.
- Wonder Woman appears as a playable character in Justice League Heroes, voiced by Courtenay Taylor.
- Wonder Woman appears as a non-playable character (NPC) in Justice League Heroes: The Flash.
- Wonder Woman appears as a playable character in Mortal Kombat vs. DC Universe, voiced by Tara Platt.
- Wonder Woman appears as a playable character in DC Universe Online, voiced initially by Gina Torres and later by Susan Eisenberg.
- Wonder Woman appears as an NPC in LittleBigPlanet 2, voiced by Jules de Jongh.
- Wonder Woman appears as an NPC in Scribblenauts Unmasked: A DC Comics Adventure.
- Wonder Woman appears as a playable character in the Injustice franchise, voiced again by Susan Eisenberg.
- Wonder Woman appears as a playable character in Infinite Crisis. voiced by Vanessa Marshall.
- Wonder Woman appears as a playable character in Arena of Valor.
- Wonder Woman appears as a cosmetic outfit in Fortnite.
- Wonder Woman appears as a playable character in DC Unchained.
- Wonder Woman appears as a playable character in DC Super Hero Girls: Teen Power, voiced again by Grey DeLisle.
- Wonder Woman appears as a playable character in MultiVersus, voiced by Abby Trott.
- Wonder Woman appears as a playable character in Justice League: Cosmic Chaos, voiced again by Vanessa Marshall.
- Wonder Woman appears as an NPC in Suicide Squad: Kill the Justice League, voiced by Zehra Fazal.
- Wonder Woman was set to appear as the main playable character in her own Self titled Video Game by Monolith Productions, based in Kirkland, Washington, until its shutdown' in February 2025, it was reported that Warner Bros. Games had decided to close the studio.

=== Lego ===
- Wonder Woman appears as a playable character in Lego Batman 2: DC Super Heroes, voiced by Laura Bailey.
- Wonder Woman appears as a playable character in Lego Batman 3: Beyond Gotham, voiced again by Laura Bailey.
- Wonder Woman appears as a playable character in Lego Dimensions, voiced again by Laura Bailey.
- Wonder Woman appears as a playable character in Lego DC Super-Villains, voiced again by Susan Eisenberg.

== Music ==
Music about or that references Wonder Woman:

- 2007: "Wonder Woman" by Trey Songz
- 2011: "Wonder Woman" by Sarah Lichtenberg featuring Ashley Carroll
- 2017: "Wonder Woman" by JoJo
- 2018: "Wonder Woman" by Kacey Musgraves
- 2018: "Wonder Woman" by Davido
- 2019: "Salt" by Ava Max
- 2020: "Wonder Woman" by Louise
- 2024: "Wonder Woman" by DaBaby

== Books ==
- Wonder Woman: The Complete History by Les Daniels (2000) ISBN 0-8118-4233-9
- Wonder Woman: The Ultimate Guide to the Amazon Princess by Scott Beatty (2003) ISBN 0-7894-9616-X
- Wonder Woman: Mythos by Carol Lay (2003) ISBN 0-7434-1711-9
- Wonder Woman: Amazon Princess by Nina Jaffe (2004) ISBN 0-06-056522-5
- Wonder Woman: The Arrival by Nina Jaffe (2004) ISBN 0-06-056519-5
- Wonder Woman: The Contest by Nina Jaffe (2004) ISBN 0-06-056518-7
- Wonder Woman: The Journey Begins by Nina Jaffe (2004) ISBN 0-06-056521-7
- Wonder Woman: The Rain Forest by Nina Jaffe (2004) ISBN 0-06-056520-9
- Wonder Woman: I Am Wonder Woman by Nina Jaffe (2004) ISBN 978-0-06-056517-6
- Wonder Woman's Book of Myths by Clare Hibbert (2004) ISBN 0-7566-0242-4
- What Would Wonder Woman Do?: An Amazon's Guide to the Working World by Suzan Colon & Jennifer Traig (2007) ISBN 0-8118-5177-X

== Trade paperbacks ==
=== Pre-Crisis stories ===
Collected stories from All Star Comics, Sensation Comics and Wonder Woman (Volume 1):

- Wonder Woman Archives Volume 1 by William Moulton Marston (1998) ISBN 1-56389-402-5
- Wonder Woman Archives Volume 2 by William Moulton Marston (2000) ISBN 1-56389-594-3
- Wonder Woman Archives Volume 3 by William Moulton Marston (2002) ISBN 1-56389-814-4
- Wonder Woman Archives Volume 4 by William Moulton Marston (2004) ISBN 1-4012-0145-8

=== Post-Crisis stories ===
The second Wonder Woman series (1986–2006) is collected in several trade paperbacks:

- Gods and Mortals: Wonder Woman #1—7 by George Pérez ISBN 1-4012-0197-0
- Challenge of the Gods: Wonder Woman #7—14 by George Pérez ISBN 1-4012-0324-8
- Beauty and the Beasts: Wonder Woman #15—19 and Action Comics #600 by George Pérez ISBN 1-4012-0484-8
- Destiny Calling: Wonder Woman #20—24 and Annual #1 by George Pérez ISBN 1-4012-0943-2
- The Contest: Wonder Woman #90—93 and #0 by William Messner-Loebs ISBN 1-56389-194-8
- The Challenge of Artemis: Wonder Woman #94—100 by William Messner-Loebs ISBN 1-56389-264-2.
- Second Genesis: Wonder Woman #101—105 by John Byrne ISBN 1-56389-318-5
- Lifelines: Wonder Woman #106—112 by John Byrne ISBN 1-56389-403-3
- Paradise Island Lost: Wonder Woman #164—170 and Wonder Woman Secret Files and Origins #2 by Phil Jimenez ISBN 1-56389-792-X
- Paradise Found: Wonder Woman #171—177 and Wonder Woman Secret Files and Origins #3 by Phil Jimenez ISBN 1-56389-956-6
- Down to Earth: Wonder Woman #195—200 by Greg Rucka ISBN 1-4012-0226-8
- Bitter Rivals: Wonder Woman #201—205 by Greg Rucka ISBN 1-4012-0462-7
- Eyes of the Gorgon: Wonder Woman #206—213 by Greg Rucka ISBN 1-4012-0797-9
- Land of the Dead: Wonder Woman #214—217 and The Flash #219 by Greg Rucka ISBN 1-4012-0938-6
- Mission's End: Wonder Woman #218—226 by Greg Rucka ISBN 1-4012-1093-7

The third Wonder Woman series (2006–2011) is collected in several trade paperbacks:

- Who Is Wonder Woman?: Wonder Woman #1—4 by Allan Heinberg (2008) ISBN 1-4012-1234-4
- Love and Murder: Wonder Woman #6—10 by Jodi Picoult (2008) ISBN 1-4012-1487-8
- The Circle: Wonder Woman #14—19 by Gail Simone (2008) ISBN 978-1-4012-1932-1
- Ends of the Earth: Wonder Woman #20-25 by Gail Simone (2009) ISBN 978-1-4012-2136-2
- Rise of the Olympian: Wonder Woman #26-33 by Gail Simone (2009) ISBN 978-1-4012-2513-1
- Warkiller: Wonder Woman #34-39 by Gail Simone (2010) ISBN 978-1-4012-2779-1
- Contagion: Wonder Woman #40-44 by Gail Simone (2010) ISBN 978-1-4012-2920-7

=== Specials, one-shots and other collections ===
- The Once and Future Story by Trina Robbins (1998) ISBN 1-56389-373-8
- Wonder Woman: Spirit of Truth by Paul Dini (2001) ISBN 1-56389-861-6
- Wonder Woman: The Hiketeia Wonder Woman vs. Batman by Greg Rucka (2002) ISBN 1-56389-898-5
- Amazons Attack! by Pete Woods (2007) ISBN 1-4012-1543-2
- JLA: A League of One by Christopher Moeller (2002) ISBN 1-56389-923-X
- JLA: Golden Perfect by Joe Kelly (collects JLA #61-65) (2003) ISBN 1-56389-941-8

== Fine arts ==
In the fine arts, and starting with the Pop Art period and on a continuing basis since the 1960s, the character has been depicted by multiple visual artists and incorporated into contemporary artwork, most notably by Andy Warhol, Roy Lichtenstein, Mel Ramos, Dulce Pinzon, and others.

== Miscellaneous ==
- May 1, 1944 - December 1, 1945, there was a daily comic strip, written by Wonder Woman creator Charles Moulton and drawn by H. G. Peter. The strip was distributed by King Features Syndicate. The complete strip is available in a collection published by IDW.
- Wonder Woman appears in the Death Battle episode "Rogue vs. Wonder Woman".
- Wonder Woman appears in DC Super Hero Girls (2015), voiced by Grey DeLisle.
- Wonder Woman appears in DC Super Friends, voiced by Rachael MacFarlane.
- Wonder Woman appears in DC Heroes United, voiced by Emily O'Brien.
- A series of records featuring Wonder Woman was released in the 1970s by Power Records.
- A dramatised audiobook adapting Lay's Wonder Woman Mythos was released by audiobook company GraphicAudio in 2009.
- A fan-made web-series following the life and calling of Bobby Barnes is released online titled The New Adventures of Wonder Boy (2024-onwards) which continues the Lynda Carter Wonder Woman timeline.
