= List of science fiction television programs, W =

This is an inclusive list of science fiction television programs whose names begin with the letter W.

== W ==
Live-action

- The Walking Dead, The (2010–2022)
- War Next Door, The (2000)
- War of the Worlds (franchise):
  - War of the Worlds (1988–1990)
  - War of the Worlds, The (2019, UK)
  - War of the Worlds (2019–2022, US/UK/France)
- Warehouse 13 (2009–2014)
- The Warlord: Battle for the Galaxy a.k.a. Osiris Chronicles, The (1998, film)
- Wayward Pines (2015-2016 US)
- Wedlock a.k.a. Deadlock (1991, film)
- Weird City (2019)
- Welcome to Paradox (1998)
- Welt am Draht a.k.a. World on a Wire (1973, Germany, miniseries, film)
- Westinghouse Studio One (1948–1958, anthology) (elements of science fiction in this episode)
- Westworld (2016–2022)
- Whispers, The (2015)
- White Dwarf (1995, film) White Dwarf IMDb
- Whitney and the Robot (1978–1989) IMDb
- Wicked Science (2004–2006, Australia)
- Wild Palms (1993, miniseries)
- Wild Wild West, The (1965–1969)
- Wizard, The (1986–1987)
- Wizards vs Aliens (2012–2014, UK)
- Wolf Lake (2001)
- Wonder Woman (franchise):
  - Wonder Woman (2011, pilot) IMDb
  - Wonder Woman (1975–1979)
  - Wonder Woman (1974, film, pilot) IMDb
  - Who's Afraid of Diana Prince? (1967) IMDb
- Woops! (1992)
- World of Giants (1959) IMDb

Animated

- Walking with... a.k.a. Trilogy of Life a.k.a. Walking with Prehistoric Life (UK, docufiction) (franchise):
  - Prehistoric Park (2006, UK, miniseries, docufiction)
  - Walking with Monsters (2005, UK, film series, docufiction)
  - Walking with Cavemen (2003, UK, miniseries, docufiction)
  - Sea Monsters – A Walking with Dinosaurs Trilogy (2003, UK, miniseries, docufiction)
  - Chased by Dinosaurs (2002, UK, miniseries, docufiction)
  - Walking with Beasts (2001, UK, miniseries, docufiction)
  - Ballad of Big Al, The a.k.a. Allosaurus: a Walking with Dinosaurs Special (2001, UK, miniseries, docufiction)
  - Walking with Dinosaurs (1999, UK, miniseries, docufiction)
- Wallace and Gromit (franchise):
  - A Grand Day Out a.k.a. A Grand Day Out with Wallace and Gromit (1989, UK, stop-motion animation, film)
  - Shaun the Sheep (2007–2010, Wallace and Gromit spin-off, UK, stop-motion animation) (elements of science fiction in The Visitor, Shaun Encounters and Cat Got Your Brain episodes)
- Wakusei Robo Danguard Ace (1977–1978, Japan, animated)
- Web Woman (1978–1980, animated, Tarzan and the Super 7 segment)
- Whatever Happened to Robot Jones? (2002–2003, animated)
- Wild Arms: Twilight Venom (1999–2000, Japan, animated)
- Wild C.A.T.s (1994–1996, animated)
- Wing Commander Academy (1996, animated)
- World Destruction: Sekai Bokumetsu no Rokunin a.k.a. World Destruction: The Six People That Will Destroy the World (2008, Japan, animated)
