= Mary Wilshire =

American comics artist (born 1953)

- Born: 1953 (age 72–73)
- Areas: Penciller, Inker
- Notable works: Firestar; Red Sonja

Mary Wilshire (born 1953) is an American comics artist best known for her work on Red Sonja and Firestar for Marvel Comics.

== Early life ==
Mary Wilshire graduated from the Pratt Institute with a Bachelor of Fine Arts in painting.

== Career ==
Mary Wilshire began her career in the comics industry drawing underground comix. Her earliest credited work was "Those Beautiful Babes in their Bain de Soleil", a four-page story in Wet Satin #2 (April 1978) published by Last Gasp. In 1980, she was hired by editor Larry Hama to work on Crazy Magazine for Marvel Comics. She became the artist of the Red Sonja series in 1983 and drew the comics adaptation of the character's 1985 film. Wilshire and writer Louise Simonson co-created Alistair Smythe, an enemy of Spider-Man, in The Amazing Spider-Man Annual #19 (1985). After a brief stint as the artist of the New Mutants, Wilshire collaborated with Tom DeFalco on the Firestar limited series. She then drew a Power Girl story for Secret Origins vol. 2 #11 (Feb. 1987).

Wilshire drew "The Amazing Travel Bureau" feature in National Geographic World for several years. In 2006, she illustrated the Fat Free: The Amazing All-True Adventures of Supersize Woman! graphic novel published by Penguin/Tarcher. Publishers Weekly noted in their review of the book, "Wilshire's limpid-eyed charcoal sketches are sensitive and touching, and give a sophisticated sense of person and place. If anything saves the day, it's Wilshire's gorgeous art, not the message."

== Bibliography ==
=== DC Comics ===
- The Big Book Of Freaks (1996)
- History of the DC Universe HC (1988)
- The Outsiders #14 (1986)
- Secret Origins vol. 2 #11 (Power Girl) (1987)
- Who's Who: The Definitive Directory of the DC Universe #7 (Duo Damsel entry) (1985)
- Who's Who: Update '87 #4 (Power Girl entry) (1987)
- Wonder Woman Annual #2 (1989)

=== Fantagraphics ===
- The Complete Wimmen's Comix #1–2 (2016)

=== Friends of Lulu ===
- Friends of Lulu: Storytime #1 (2000)

=== Hassle Free Press ===
- The Best of Wimmen's Comix (1979)

=== HM Communications, Inc. ===
- Heavy Metal #v5#12, #v6#8, #v6#12, #v7#6 (1982–1983)

=== Last Gasp ===
- After/Shock: Bulletins from Ground Zero (1981)
- Strip AIDS U.S.A. (1988)
- Wet Satin #2 (1978)
- Wimmen's Comix #8–9 (1983–1984)
- Young Lust #6 (1980)

=== Marvel Comics ===
- The Amazing Spider-Man Annual #19 (1985)
- Barbie #1, 6, 11, 20, 23–24, 40, 46, 52, 59 (1991–1995)
- Barbie Fashion #13, 16, 25, 39, 41–42, 50–51 (1992–1995)
- Crazy Magazine #65–66, 68–69, 71–72, 74–75, 77–92 (1980–1982)
- Disney's the Little Mermaid #1 (1994)
- Droids #5 (1986)
- Firestar #1–4 (1986)
- Ka-Zar the Savage #30, 32 (1984)
- Life of Christ: The Christmas Story #1 (1993)
- Life of Christ: The Easter Story #1 (1993)
- Marvel Saga #22 (1987)
- Marvel Super Special #38 (Red Sonja movie adaptation) (1985)
- New Mutants #35–37 (1986)
- Official Handbook of the Conan Universe #1 (1986)
- Official Handbook of the Marvel Universe #14 (Miss America entry) (1984)
- Official Handbook of the Marvel Universe Deluxe Edition #2–3, 7, 18 (1986–1987)
- Power Pack #5 (1984)
- Red Sonja vol. 3 #2–4, 8–13 (1983–1986)
- Savage Sword of Conan #83, 89 (1982–1983)
- Savage Tales vol. 2 #3 (1986)
- Spider-Man and Power Pack #1 (1984)

=== NBM Publishing ===
- Skin Tight Orbit #1 (1995)

=== Penguin/Tarcher ===
- Fat Free: The Amazing All-True Adventures of Supersize Woman! (2006)

=== Renegade Press ===
- Renegade Romance #1 (1987)

=== Trans-High Corporation ===
- High Times #49 (1979)

Preceded by Steve Leialoha	New Mutants artist 1986	Succeeded by Rick Leonardi
