= Firestar (limited series) =

- Cover to Firestar #3 (1986).

Publication information
- Publisher: Marvel Comics
- Schedule: Monthly
- Format: Limited series
- Publication date: March – June 1986
- No. of issues: 4

Creative team
- Created by: Dennis Marks; Tom DeFalco; Dan Spiegle; Christy Marx; Chris Claremont; John Romita, Jr.
- Written by: Tom DeFalco
- Penciller: Mary Wilshire
- Inker: Steve Leialoha
- Colorist: Dana Graziunas

Firestar was a four-issue comic book limited series, published in 1986 by Marvel Comics, that established the origin story of the Firestar character within Marvel Comics continuity.

Firestar was originally a character created solely for the animated series Spider-Man and His Amazing Friends as a "fire" counterpart for previously established character Iceman, and had no appearances in Marvel comics prior to the animated series. The first Marvel comic that Firestar appeared in was 1981's Spider-Man and His Amazing Friends #1. The first published, in-continuity appearance of Firestar was Uncanny X-Men #193 (May 1985).

The limited series presents Firestar's comic book origin for the first time in print, which differs significantly from the animated character's origin. The limited series covers events that happened both before and after the Uncanny X-Men appearance. In 2006, the series was collected into one digest sized paperback, titled X-Men: Firestar (ISBN 0-7851-2200-1).

== Plot summaries ==
=== Issue #1 ===
Angelica Jones lives with her middle-aged father and paternal grandmother. "Angel" (her father's pet name for her) is shy and withdrawn, and her family moves frequently, but she gets emotional support from her "Nana".

At her new school, Angelica is taunted by a girl named Cassie. One day when Angelica becomes upset, her hand starts to glow, causing her milk carton to explode. Some distance away, at the Massachusetts Academy, the energy signature of an emerging mutant is noticed by Emma Frost, the White Queen of the Hellfire Club, but the trace disappears before her technicians can pinpoint an exact location.

After Angelica finds her entry in an ice sculpting contest ruined by Cassie, Angelica's whole body begins to glow, causing all the ice sculptures to melt. The White Queen notices the child again through use of her mutant-detecting system Multivak, as does Charles Xavier through his Cerebro system. Both are mutant telepaths who seek to train young, emerging mutants, but Xavier wishes to help mutants integrate peaceably into society through training at his School for Gifted Youngsters, while the Hellfire Club's agenda is to create a social class of elite mutants, with themselves at the top.

When Angelica arrives home, she finds out her Nana has died. As Angelica's father wonders what to do with his "Angel", Emma Frost lets herself in. She explains that Angelica is a mutant, and she will be able to teach the girl about her powers and how to use them at her Massachusetts Academy. Frost then speaks to the girl much as her Nana once did, with reassurances of how special she is. Angelica decides to go with her. Xavier arrives in a limousine, only minutes too late; he regretfully decides that in this instance, the White Queen has won.

The comic book origin of Firestar shares a few similarities with her animated counterpart's origin, as shown in the Amazing Friends episode, "A Firestar Is Born". The animated Firestar was also raised by a single father in his middle years, who was a construction worker. The animated Firestar also contended with a female peer who bullied her, a girl named Bonnie; the difference being that she apparently lived in the same area throughout her youth, as she is shown dealing with Bonnie from childhood to late adolescence.

=== Issue #2 ===
The story picks up months after Angelica arrives at the Massachusetts Academy. A few of the other students are also mutants, and are members of the Hellfire Club's training team, the Hellions. Angelica is kept isolated from the other mutant students by orders of Emma Frost.

Angelica is still very withdrawn and socially awkward, her only friends besides Frost being her personal bodyguard, Randall Chase, and her favorite horse. The White Queen has many plans for Angelica, whom she has given the code-name "Firestar", intending to groom her into an assassin and bodyguard, and to obtain her assistance for power struggles within the club. She starts to plague Angelica with nightmares through a device disguised as a bracelet. Angelica makes progress with her powers, learning that she can use them to fly.

A dance held at the Massachusetts Academy is attended not only by the Academy student body, but also by the New Mutants, a "junior team" of teenage mutants trained at Xavier's school. During the dance, the stable suddenly catches fire. Angelica runs to the stable to save her horse, but it collapses and dies as soon as it is clear of the flames. Believing that she killed the horse and started the fire, Angelica starts to break down emotionally with fear of herself and her powers. In truth, the White Queen started the fire through hidden devices, and telepathically killed the horse, knowing that breaking down Angelica's psyche will ultimately lead to the girl belonging to the Hellfire Club body and soul.

=== Uncanny X-Men #193 ===
Chronologically, the events of Firestar's published debut in Uncanny X-Men #193 occur between issue #2 and #3 of the Firestar limited series. At some point between issue #2 and the Uncanny story, Firestar is given her unique masked costume. She is manipulated by the powers of the Hellion Empath to join him and his teammate Roulette in an attempt to aid another Hellion, Thunderbird (later known as Warpath), in the latter's revenge campaign against the X-Men, whom he held responsible for the death of his brother, the first Thunderbird. Firestar and the Hellions involved are all defeated, and Professor Xavier, Thunderbird's prime target, manages to convince him that Thunderbird lost his life heroically.

Afterwards, Angelica and her classmates are brought to Xavier's school, and Xavier offers her a place at the school. Angelica is touched by the offer, but loyalty to Emma Frost prompts her to refuse. Xavier accepts her decision, saying only that he hopes Frost proves worthy of Angelica's loyalty. Thunderbird also refuses a similar offer, and they are allowed to return to the Massachessetts Academy. In a nod to the events of the Firestar limited series, which was published not long after the Uncanny story, Sam Guthrie appears in the background of the final scene at Xavier's school.

=== Issue #3 ===
With practice, Firestar's maneuvering in flight is getting better, as well as her ability to control how she releases heat.

Angelica accidentally almost reveals her mutant nature to Mrs. Cohen, the dance teacher, but she still is granted a promised visit home. The visit seems too early for Angelica's father. He has not come to terms with her being a mutant, and greets her distantly. Angelica is hurt and shocked, and decides to cut the visit short. In a scene at the airport, a mob of angry, frightened people attack her and her father when she is discovered to be a mutant. Angelica fights back with her powers, trying to chase the mob away by firing microwave blasts around them rather than attacking them directly. One man is severely injured.

It turns out the encounter was not accidental, but was planned by the White Queen herself, intended to force Firestar to use her powers directly against a living target. Soon, claims the White Queen, Firestar will use her powers as an assassin, and the Black Queen will surely die.

=== Issue #4 ===
In the opening sequence, what seems to be a sniper attack against Emma Frost is actually a set-up to make Angelica believe in the menace of the Black Queen. Frost invites Angelica to a formal dance at the Hellfire Club in New York City. She intends to use Angelica as an assassin against the Black Queen during the event. When Randall worries too much about the White Queen's plans, Frost has him captured and tells Angelica that he had been killed by Selene.

In truth, Randall has been merely held captive; he escapes, but is mortally wounded in the process. He manages to get to Angelica, telling her the truth with his dying breath. Furious, Angelica goes to confront the White Queen in her underground complex as Firestar, and cutting totally loose with her powers, she humiliates Frost. Forcing the Queen to run for her life, Firestar causes an explosion, severely damaging the underground complex and the school buildings above. The White Queen lets Firestar escape for the time being, deciding that there would be no profit in taking action and that she would have to find another way to deal with the Black Queen.

Angelica returns to her father, more confident now, as she knows that she can control her powers and always could; it was her own self-doubt and insecurity that kept her from doing so before. Her father, regretting his rejection of his "Angel" before, embraces her back into his life.

== Further adventures ==
Firestar joined the New Warriors several years later. She had another encounter with the White Queen and the Hellions when they came to "reclaim" Firestar from the Warriors. Despite the White Queen and Night Thrasher's mentor, Tai, attempting to determine Firestar's fate through the outcome of the battle between the Warriors and the Hellions, Firestar asserted that she would decide her own fate, and chose to remain with the Warriors. She eventually made her peace with Emma Frost in Generation X #59.

After many of the Hellions were killed by the mutant Trevor Fitzroy, Firestar and Warpath, accompanied by Warpath's X-Force teammate Cannonball, went on a mission to inform Empath and Magma of their teammates' deaths. The trio then went to the Massachusetts Academy, where they removed the few remaining files on record of the Hellions' existence. Currently, only Firestar, Warpath, Empath, Magma, and a resurrected Tarot remain of the White Queen's original team of Hellions. Emma Frost, now allied with Xavier's School due to guilt over her original students' deaths, would later train a new team of young mutants called Generation X, and establish a training squad at Xavier's school.

The Firestar limited series was reprinted as a Marvel Digest in May 2006, the year of the Amazing Friends TV series' 25th anniversary. In August 2006, Marvel further honored the anniversary with Spider-Man Family: Amazing Friends #1, a one-shot featuring the first in-continuity team-up of Spider-Man, Iceman, and Firestar, set shortly after Firestar's public debut with the New Warriors, as well as a humorous comic strip starring the trio.
