= Red Sonja: Queen of Plagues =

2015 film by Simon West

- Directed by: Gail Simone
- Written by: Gail Simone (graphic novel); Walter Geovani (illustrations); Jenny Frison (illustrations)
- Based on: Red Sonja (2013) by Gail Simone; Red Sonja by; Roy Thomas; Barry Windsor-Smith; Red Sonya of Rogatino by Robert E. Howard
- Produced by: Sean Patrick O'Reilly; Juan Collado; Shannon Kingston
- Edited by: Brendan Hansell
- Production company: Shout! Factory
- Release date: August 2, 2016
- Running time: 75 minutes
- Country: United States
- Language: English

Red Sonja: Queen of Plagues is a 2016 animated sword and sorcery film featuring the character Red Sonja, adapted from the Dynamite Entertainment's Red Sonja volume 2 (2013) comic #1–6, collected as Red Sonja Volume 1: Queen of Plagues. Originally produced by Gail Simone and Walter Geovani, the motion comic adaptation featured Misty Lee voicing the red-haired barbarian. The adaptation was produced by Shout! Factory, in partnership with Dynamite Entertainment and Red Sonja LLC.

== Plot ==
Red Sonja, the She-Devil with a Sword, intends to pay back a blood debt owed to the one man who has gained her respect even if it means leading a doomed army to their certain deaths.

== Cast ==
- Misty Lee as Red Sonja
- Shannon Kingston as Ayla / Nias
- Becca Strom as Dark Annisia / Lila / Guard Girl / Seamstress / Female Soldier
- Scott McNeil as Tiath / Bazrat
- Tyler Nicol as King Dimat / Toda/Thief 1 / Zamora Soldier 1 / Blue Spine / Marauder / Purple Fishman / Hermit Fishman
- Mark Wheeler as Apos
- Brian Ward as Sonja’s Father / Peasant / Felth
- Dan Zachary as Ryshack / Archer / Grufo
- JJ Webb as Verdes / Boxer / Yellow Eyes / Thief 3
- Sean Patrick O'Reilly as Tevius / Thief 2
- Brendan Hansell as Trident / Zamora Soldier 2 / Mob member / Puffer / Trident Piranha / Sharp Theet
- Joshua Larson as Puffer / Droop
- Kiefer O'Reilly as Arrick / Brother 2
- Julie Shields as Female Patron

== Production ==
Dynamite Entertainment, who publish the Red Sonja comic books, collaborated with animation studio Shout! Factory to produce the film.

The film was first announced on July 22, 2016 at San Diego Comic-Con, and the announcement was accompanied by the first trailer.

== Release ==
It was released in a DVD/Blu-Ray combo pack in the United States on August 2, 2016.

== Reception ==
DVD Talk awarded it a mildly positive review, saying "Red Sonja: Queen Of Plagues won't win over those who can't get into motion comics but if you enjoy the format, this is a good one." High-def Digest awarded it three out of five stars, saying "It is a damn shame that this is a motion comic because all of the epic feel is sucked out of it and just comes off as a cheaply made cash-in on the recent comic book popularity."
