= Red Sonja: Consumed =

2024 novel by Gail Simone

- Cover of Red Sonja: Consumed - 1st Edition 2024
- Author: Gail Simone
- Audio read by: Felicia Day
- Cover artist: Mike Heath, Lauren Panepinto
- Genre: Fantasy
- Publisher: Orbit Books
- Publication date: November 19, 2024
- Media type: Book
- ISBN: 978-0316475679

Red Sonja: Consumed is the debut novel by Gail Simone, first published in 2024 by Orbit Books. The story follows the adventures of Marvel Comics/Dynamite Entertainment sword and sorcery heroine Red Sonja as she deals with a murderous supernatural entity emerging from the ground and pulling its unsuspecting victims to their deaths as well as the consequences of her dark past in Hyrkania.

== Characters ==
- Red Sonja: "The She-Devil of Hyrkania"; a warrior-for-hire who is the last surviving member of her village after a tribal massacre.
- Queen Ysidra: Sonja's former betrothed, from whom Sonja steals a valuable asp-shaped circlet.
- Sylus Temptree: An assassin working for the Falcon, the criminal who commissioned Sonja to steal the circlet.

== Style ==
Red Sonja: Consumed is written in third person and follows the narratives of several different characters. Each chapter opens with excerpts from fictional documents, records, and poems.

== Development ==
Simone was hesitant to begin a full-length prose novel, but began with an idea for a short story, which became one of the novel's early chapters. After positive reactions from publishers, she developed an outline for the full story.

In 2025, Simone announced she is working on a second novel in the series.

== Reception ==
Publishers Weekly praised Simone's balance of violence and humor, which "makes her heroine feel simultaneously larger-than-life and deeply human." SFFWorld applauded Simone's depth of characterization in the novel which makes Sonja "a more detailed character with nuances that go beyond the comic book version." However, reviewers more familiar with Robert E. Howard’s world and Sword and Sorcery topics criticized the novel’s uneven world-building and repetitive plotting, arguing that its setting sometimes feels generic and less culturally grounded than the Hyborian-inspired premise suggests.
