= Red Sonja (1985 film) =

1985 American film directed by Richard Fleischer

- Theatrical release poster by Renato Casaro
- Directed by: Richard Fleischer
- Written by: Clive Exton; George MacDonald Fraser
- Based on: Red Sonya of Rogatino by Robert E. Howard
- Produced by: Christian Ferry
- Starring: Brigitte Nielsen; Sandahl Bergman; Paul Smith; Ernie Reyes Jr; Ronald Lacey; Arnold Schwarzenegger
- Cinematography: Giuseppe Rotunno
- Edited by: Frank J. Urioste
- Music by: Ennio Morricone
- Production company: Dino De Laurentiis Corporation
- Distributed by: MGM/UA Entertainment Co.
- Release date: July 3, 1985 (U.S.)
- Running time: 89 minutes
- Country: United States
- Language: English
- Budget: $17.9 million
- Box office: $6.9 million

Red Sonja is a 1985 American sword-and-sorcery film directed by Richard Fleischer, from a screenplay by Clive Exton and George MacDonald Fraser. It is based on Red Sonya of Rogatino by Robert E. Howard. It stars Brigitte Nielsen (in her film debut) as the title character and Arnold Schwarzenegger as her companion Lord Kalidor, with Sandahl Bergman, Paul Smith and Ronald Lacey in supporting roles.

As in Howard's Conan, Red Sonja takes place in the Hyborian Age, a fictional prehistoric time previously depicted in the films Conan the Barbarian (1982) and Conan the Destroyer (1984), which featured several of the same cast and crew. It tells the story of Sonja, who, after being raped, receives a divine gift and seeks revenge on her assailants.

Red Sonja was theatrically released in the United States on July 3, 1985, by MGM/UA Entertainment Co. Upon release, the film was a critical and commercial failure, grossing $6.9 million against a budget of $17.9 million.

== Plot ==
Sonja, a young, red-haired woman, is gang-raped and left for dead by soldiers of Queen Gedren, who murdered Sonja's parents and her brother after Sonja had rejected the queen's sexual advances and scarred Gedren's face. Answering Sonja's cry for revenge, a female spirit appears and gives her heightened sword-fighting skills on the condition that she never lie with a man unless he defeats her in fair combat. She trains under the warriors of a sword-master called "The Grand Master" and mistrusts nearly all other men.

At a nearby temple, Varna, Sonja's sister, is in an order of priestesses preparing to banish the Talisman, a mystical light-powered relic that created the world and all living things. The Talisman can be used and touched only by women – men vanish if they touch it – and has become too powerful to control. However, Gedren's army and her aide-de-camp Ikol intervene, slaughtering most of the priestesses and shield-maidens before they can imprison the Talisman in permanent darkness.

Varna watches Gedren steal the Talisman and throw the surviving priestesses in the vault that contained it, before escaping, but is mortally wounded. She is discovered by Kalidor, the Lord of Hyrkania, who looks for Sonja and brings her to Varna. Before dying, Varna tells Sonja to find the Talisman and send it into darkness before it ravages the world with storms and earthquakes. Kalidor offers to accompany Sonja, who rejects the offer.

After witnessing the Talisman in use, Sonja arrives in the now-ruined kingdom of Hablock. She meets the young Prince Tarn and his servant/bodyguard Falkon. Gedren used the Talisman to devastate Hablock when Tarn refused to surrender. Tarn wants to crush Gedren and invites Sonja to be his cook. She declines before being told that Gedren is based in Berkubane, the land of Perpetual Night.

Arriving at the mountain gate, Sonja fights Lord Brytag after he refuses her passage for not paying him a "tender tribute". When she kills him and takes his key, his troops surround her; Kalidor, who has secretly followed Sonja, attacks their rear, allowing her to escape. Sonja comes across Tarn again, being tortured by bandits. She frees Tarn and kills the bandits with Falkon. They decide to travel together towards Berkubane, and Tarn takes Sonja's advice and learns good manners over sword practice.

Gedren's wizard uses a magic screen to show the approaching party; Gedren recognizes Sonja and orders that she be brought to the fortress unharmed. Using the Talisman to conjure a storm, she forces Sonja's group to take shelter in a watery cavern in Ictyan where Gedren's dragon-like “Killing Machine" is unleashed. Kalidor appears and helps Sonja blind the mechanical beast so they can escape.

Sonja accepts Kalidor's company after learning that he is descended from the lords who entrusted the Talisman to the temple. He flirts with her, so she warns him that "no man can have me" unless he defeats her. Kalidor challenges her and they sword-fight to a draw, despite Tarn's attempts to hobble Kalidor. The party arrives at Castle Berkubane and, to protect Tarn, they convince him to stay behind and guard the front entrance.

Ikol, realizing Gedren is insane when she refuses his pleas to stop using the unstable relic, plans to escape with bags of Hablock's gold. Sonja confronts Gedren in her council chamber and kills her wizard, while Kalidor and Falkon deal with her guards in the castle's dining hall. Ikol is stopped by Tarn at the entrance and is crushed to death by the door.

Overpowered by Sonja, Gedren flees to the Chamber of Lights where the Talisman is stored. Now powerful beyond control, the Talisman causes the floor to split open and reveal a chasm of molten lava. Dueling Gedren, Sonja runs her through with her sword, sending the queen plunging into the lava below. Sonja throws the Talisman in after her, destroying it and starting a chain reaction that tears Castle Berkubane apart.

The heroes escape as the rising volcano consumes the castle. Sonja and Kalidor kiss after an inconclusive "sword fight", while Tarn and Falkon ride back to Hablock to rebuild it.

== Cast ==
- Arnold Schwarzenegger as Lord Kalidor
- Brigitte Nielsen as Red Sonja
- Sandahl Bergman as Queen Gedren
- Paul Smith as Falkon
- Ernie Reyes, Jr. as Tarn
- Ronald Lacey as Ikol
- Pat Roach as Brytag
- Terry Richards as Djart
- Janet Agren as Varna
- Donna Osterbuhr as Kendra
- Lara Nakszyński as Gedren's handmaid
- Hans Meyer as Sonja's father
- Francesca Romana Coluzzi as Sonja's mother
- Stefano Mioni as Barlok, Sonja's brother
- Tutte Lemkow as Wizard
- Kiyoshi Yamazaki as Kyobo
- Sven-Ole Thorsen as Lord Brytag's bodyguard
- Erik Holmey as Lord Brytag's bodyguard

== Production ==
A film adaptation of the Robert E. Howard character Red Sonya of Rogatino was first announced in 1983 with Ralph Bakshi directing. Production was pushed back a year and Bakshi was replaced with Richard Fleischer, who also directed the previous Robert E. Howard adaptation featuring Arnold Schwarzenegger, Conan the Destroyer.

In Conan the Barbarian, Sandahl Bergman played Valeria, a thief and the love of Conan's life. Bergman was offered the role of Red Sonja, but turned it down, choosing instead to play the villainous Queen Gedren. The film's producer Dino De Laurentiis met with actress Laurene Landon and was set to offer her the role of Red Sonja until he discovered she was in an earlier film called Hundra; fearing that it was too similar, De Laurentiis decided not to give her the part. In "Surprise!", a 2015 season 5 episode of The Real Housewives of Beverly Hills, soap opera actress Eileen Davidson revealed that she auditioned for the role and was actually runner-up to Brigitte Nielsen. It took De Laurentiis almost a year to find an actress "Amazonian" enough to play the title character; he was still looking, eight weeks before the scheduled production, when he saw Brigitte Nielsen on the cover of a fashion magazine. The 21-year-old native of Helsingør, Denmark, in Milan for a modeling job, soon found herself on a plane heading for Rome and a successful screen test.

George MacDonald Fraser, who had recently adapted Twenty Thousand Leagues Under the Seas for De Laurentiis, was hired to work on the script during filming. Several scenes were shot in Italy, around the Gran Sasso massif (Celano, Campo Felice and Campo Imperatore) and in studios in Rome.

In the Italian market the movie was re-titled Yado with Schwarzenegger on the poster, as if he were the main character. Lord Kalidor was renamed Yado, and that is how he introduces himself to Sonja when they first meet.

== Music ==
The musical score of Red Sonja was composed and conducted by Ennio Morricone.

=== Soundtrack ===
Track listing for the first release on LP

1. Symphonic Suite for Chorus and Orchestra - Part I (16:37)
2. Symphonic Suite for Chorus and Orchestra - Part II (18:42)

Track listing for the CD release

1. Prologue (01:24)
2. Main Title (02:22)
3. The Talisman (03:15)
4. Temple Raid (01:39)
5. Touch It (01:03)
6. Sonja and the Sword Master (01:49)
7. Vanna's Death (02:00)
8. The Gate of Brytag (01:47)
9. Sonja vs. Brytag (01:14)
10. Fighting the Soldiers (03:36)
11. The Talisman II (1:10)
12. The Chamber of Lights (02:02)
13. Sonja Teaches Tarn (01:33)
14. Treasure in the Cavern (02:07)
15. Sonja and Kalidor (1:46)
16. A Fair Fight (01:50)
17. Entering the Castle (02:12)
18. Sonja Defeats the Queen (01:36)
19. End Credits (03:42)
20. Sorcery (00:46)

== Reception ==
=== Critical response ===
The film received generally negative reviews from critics. Rotten Tomatoes gave the film a score of 23%, based on 30 reviews, with the site's critical consensus stating, "Dull, poorly directed, and badly miscast, Red Sonja is an uninspired conclusion to Schwarzenegger's barbarian trilogy." On Metacritic, the film has a score of 35% based on reviews from 6 critics, indicating "generally unfavorable reviews". Audiences polled by CinemaScore gave the film an average grade of "D+" on an A+ to F scale.

Schwarzenegger commented, "It's the worst film I have ever made." He joked, "Now I tell my kids that, if they get out of line, they'll be forced to watch Red Sonja ten times in a row. It must be working, because I've never had much trouble with any of them."

John Grant, who authored the film's entry in The Encyclopedia of Fantasy (1997), gave Red Sonja a negative review, commenting "Morally dubious (Gedren's lesbianism is depicted as one of her evil attributes) and worse-acted than words can explain, Red Sonja is a great embarrassment."

Film historian Leonard Maltin gave the movie 1.5 out of a possible 4 stars. He went on to cite the picture as: "Spectacularly silly...While it might amuse juvenile viewers, most of the fun for adults is in deciding who gives the worse performance -- Brigitte Nielsen or Sandahl Bergman."

Joe Kane, the "Phantom of the Movies", gave the film 1 out of 4 stars. According to him, "While Conan the Barbarian was sword-and-sorcery, this is grunt-and-groan: the actors grunt, while the audience groans...Amid wooden thespianism, redundant comedy relief, and clunky storytelling, Arnold Schwarzenegger's most impressive feat is managing to stay offscreen for more than half the running time despite being top-billed."

Siskel and Ebert also gave the film negative reviews though both considered the film unintentionally funny. Both Gene Siskel and Roger Ebert agreed that the film was poorly made, yet it contained enough campy humor that it might have been intended as a spoof; Ebert noted the "dialogue which sounds like the actors have already read the Mad magazine parody of this film". Both critics laughed during their reviews, notably when Siskel noted the awkward position of the Buddha statue.

Andrea Wright, writing for the Journal of Gender Studies, has argued that the film represents a problematic representation of women, because the character of Red Sonja is sexualized and relies on a male counterpart.

=== Accolades ===
The film was nominated for three Golden Raspberry Awards: Worst Actress (Brigitte Nielsen), Worst New Star (Nielsen) and Worst Supporting Actress (Sandahl Bergman). Nielsen won in the Worst New Star category, shared for her performance in Rocky IV, at the 6th Golden Raspberry Awards.

== Comic books ==
Marvel Comics published a comic book adaptation of the film by writer Louise Simonson and artists Mary Wilshire and Vince Colletta in Marvel Super Special #38. The adaptation was also available as a two-issue limited series.

== Reboot ==
A second Red Sonja film had been in development for several years. In 2008, Robert Rodriguez and his production company Troublemaker Studios were working on a version that would have starred Rose McGowan as the title character. By 2009 however, the Rodriguez project had been scrapped, and as of February 2010, rights holders Nu Image were moving forward with another projected new film, to be directed by Simon West. Producer Avi Lerner said he would like to see Amber Heard take the role of Sonja, after having worked with her on Drive Angry. Lerner said the film would shoot before the sequel to Conan the Barbarian. In August 2012 at the premiere of The Expendables 2, West said that the film was stuck in production. In February 2015, it was reported that Christopher Cosmos had been hired as a screenwriter for the new film.

In November 2017, Deadline reported that Millennium Films would finance and produce a new Red Sonja film with Lerner and Joe Gatta producing alongside Cinelou Films’ Mark Canton and Courtney Solomon and written by Ashley Miller. In September 2018, The Hollywood Reporter reported that the studio was eyeing Bryan Singer to direct the film. In October 2018, Singer was confirmed to direct the film. On February 11, 2019, Millennium Films announced Red Sonja was no longer on their slate of films, due to recent sexual abuse allegations against Singer. In March 2019, according to a Charlotte Kirk article, Lerner dropped Singer from the project because he was unable to secure a domestic distributor. In June 2019, Joey Soloway signed on to write, direct and produce the film. On February 26, 2021, The Hollywood Reporter announced that Tasha Huo will write the film. On May 5, 2021, the same publication announced that Hannah John-Kamen is cast as the title character. The movie was supposed to film in 2022. John-Kamen and Solway both later left the film. Millennium Films then picked M. J. Bassett to write and direct the film and opened a casting call for the title role. The title character then played by Matilda Lutz and the film was released in 2025.

== See also ==
- List of American films of 1985
- Arnold Schwarzenegger filmography
