= Ends of the Earth (DC Comics) =

Series of comic books

- Cover of Wonder Woman: Ends of the Earth (2009); hardcover collected edition, art by Travis Lanham.
- Publisher: DC Comics
- Publication date: July – November 2008
- Genre: Superhero; Mythology
- Title(s): Wonder Woman vol. 3 #20–23
- Main character(s): Wonder Woman; Beowulf; Stalker; Claw the Unconquered; Etta Candy; Nemesis

Creative team
- Writer: Gail Simone
- Penciller: Aaron Lopresti
- Inker: Matt Ryan
- Letterer(s): Travis Lanham; Steve Wands
- Colorist: Brad Anderson
- Editor(s): Nachie Castro; Matt Idelson
- (Hardcover): ISBN 1-4012-2136-X

"Ends of the Earth" is the name of a four-issue comic book story arc written by Gail Simone with art by Aaron Lopresti. Published in issues #20–23 of Wonder Woman vol. 3, it is the third story arc under Gail Simone's writing reigns, following "The Circle" and a two-parter found in issues #18–19. It also marks the return of DC Comics's version of the Beowulf character since his last appearance back in the 1970s.

== Publication history ==
Gail Simone has said her thinking behind the series:

It's really easy to get lost in the message of Wonder Woman and forget about the adventure of Wonder Woman, because I feel like she's the greatest female adventurer that there's ever been. I've felt like taking her back to that type of an adventure would really help cement that feeling of her character.

== Plot ==
At a location where snow is falling and it is cold in the wind, Wonder Woman walks to her destination. She is hunted and attacked by wolves, who are diseased and are in no control of their attacks. With her help, Diana lets the wolves die in peace as like they were warriors before continuing on. Eventually, she finally reaches a bar where the likes of myth such as barbarians are there. She sits, and then after waiting, who she was waiting for finally arrives: Beowulf. Some time before all this; Diana is assigned to create her own team as part of the Department of Metahuman Affairs. This assignment makes her know that Sarge Steel is on to her. After lunch with friend Etta Candy, the same intruder from her apartment (from The Circle) appears. He says he has no name, but lets it out that he is a demon, he is the DC Comics character known as Stalker. So Diana uses her lasso of truth to see if he is telling the truth: the end result leaves her cold and shaken as the man has no soul. The man has come to give a quest for Diana to do for him: kill D’Grth aka the devil.

Back in the present, the meeting between Nemesis and Diana's gorilla friends doesn't start off well.

Then, peasants loyal to Grendel, whom Beowulf was asking for, prepare to attack them. Wonder Woman and Beowulf fight off the Grendel worshippers and are able to escape, and Stalker proposes that they must work together. The prophecy states that Stalker and three powerful warriors will stop D'Grth. They visit and Oracle who aids them in their quest and tells them of the prophecy.

Diana begins to find herself conflicted when she loses her compassion and memories of her friends and allies. She is losing a side of herself in order to travel to the Black Horizon, where D'Grth lives. Wonder Woman also gives Stalker a name, Elpis, so that he may find new meaning and identity. Diana also ends up having a demonized disfigured hand, similar to Claw.

On the way, they meet Claw the Unconquered, but he and Diana do not get along well. Diana tries to use the Lasso of Truth on him, but ends up having to knock him out when it fails to activate to her call. After arriving at the Black Horizon, they find Grendel, who is a servant of D'Grth. As the three warriors battle the devil, Elpis shows his treachery and mortally wounds Beowulf.

Elpis/Stalker explains that D'Grth will give him his soul back in exchange for the three warriors who would be able to stop him, as well as the piece of magic he wears on his neck. Diana makes Claw get Beowulf to safety, and is able to steal Elpis' magic stone. She uses it to swap souls with Elpis, and transport D'Grth to Earth, where she can finish her final battle in Washington, DC.

While battling, Diana realizes that her deformed hand keeps her safe from D'Grth's burning touch, and that she is meant to finish off the devil himself. After saving a news helicopter from crashing, Diana is able to activate her Lasso of Truth by remembering the mercy she gave to the Wolves at the beginning of the story, and takes off D'Grth's hand. She uses her invisible jet to fly down and cut him in half.

Back in the other plane, The Oracle finds them and they can only finish off D'Grth with the four swords of Beowulf, Diana, Claw, and Elpis. Elpis refuses because he wants his soul, but Diana returns with D'Grth's head and convinces him that her soul is from the Gods and his is gone forever. Using their combined swords, they finish off D'Grth despite his offers, threats, and pleas.

Elpis goes off with The Oracle, trying to find direction in his life. Beowulf will heal from his grievous wounds, and Diana returns to Earth after receiving Beowulf's prized sword.

Back on Earth, Donna Troy is able to broker a peace between the Gorillas and Nemesis. Diana says it is for her to let Tom know what is going on, and to trust them. Tom calls off the back up he asked for earlier and says it was all a mistake, but Sarge Steel thinks the conspiracy goes deeper and show some signs of mental distress.

Tom and Diana visit Themiscyra and Tom must meet with Hippolyta, and who gives him a working over with strange tasks and questions. Once she is satisfied with him, she makes him an Amazon entitled: Sir Thomas of Cleveland, even though he is male. She awards him with a spear made especially for him, and asks that he sire many grandchildren.

With two Gorillas at her side, Diana meets with a group of Hollywood executives for a Wonder Woman movie. The group is Ms. Laney Kirswel, the director, the writer, and their PR representative Alison Condero, a skeptic. Even without Diana's permission, they wish to write a movie on her exploits. If Diana gives them her permission, she will get a creative consultant credit and a million dollars towards Diana's women's shelter.

After a talk with Alison Condero, Diana tells her she can stop after Alison expresses her dislike of Diana's use of violence to solve problems, and her revealing outfit. Alison breaks away before anything else is revealed.

While on the lot, one of the writers explains that Hercules will have a love triangle plot with Wonder Woman and Hippolyta, which outrages Diana. Before anything else can happen, different versions of Wonder Woman from different ages of her history attack her, and it turns out Laney Kirswell is actually the Queen of Fables.

Diana ate an apple that was given to her as refreshment, and the magic has distorted Diana's perception. She must fight through the screenwriter's ridiculous dialogue and perception of events of the movie, while fighting the Queen's machinations. Diana eventually overpowers the Queen of Fables and saves Alison's life. Diana shuts down the production of the movie and says she will have lawyers if they try to cash off on the footage they have filmed.

When Diana visits Alison at night, it is revealed Alison has had a drinking problem and has thus quit since her ordeal on the film lot. Alison has had a hard time readjusting since her spouse died, and Diana comforts her and brings some bracelets for her daughters. Alison wakes up her daughters so they can meet Diana, and Diana relishes meeting two of her biggest fans.

Diana flies away contemplating children.

== Collected editions ==
The storyline has been collected into a single volume:

- Wonder Woman: Ends of the Earth (collects Wonder Woman #20–25, 144 pages, hardcover, March 2009, ISBN 1-4012-2136-X)
