= Gail Simone =

American comic book writer (born 1974)

- Simone at the Rose City Comic Con in 2026
- Born: July 29, 1974 (age 52) Oregon, U.S.
- Areas: Writer, comics critic
- Notable works: Birds of Prey; Secret Six; Welcome to Tranquility; Wonder Woman; Red Sonja; Batgirl

Gail Simone (born July 29, 1974) is an American writer best known for her work in comics on DC's Birds of Prey, Batgirl, Dynamite Entertainment's Red Sonja, and for being the longest-running female writer on Wonder Woman to date. Other notable works include Clean Room, Secret Six, Welcome to Tranquility, The All-New Atom, and Deadpool.

She enjoyed a long-running stint on The Simpsons comics and has also written for television and video games. In 2024, Orbit Books published her debut novel Red Sonja: Consumed.

Her work has been nominated for a number of awards including the GLAAD Media Award, and she is the recipient of an Inkpot Award at the 2017 San Diego Comic-Con.

== Career ==
=== Early work ===
Gail Simone was born and raised in Oregon.

A former hairdresser who studied theater in college, Simone first came to public notice through Women in Refrigerators, a website founded in 1999 by comics fans in response to a scene in Green Lantern #54, in which Kyle Rayner's girlfriend, Alexandra DeWitt, is murdered and her corpse shoved in a refrigerator for him to find. The fans analyzed the treatment of women in fiction and concluded that they are often killed or harmed to advance the narrative of male characters. The site brought Simone into contact with many people working in the comics industry.

Beginning in October 1999, her column You'll All Be Sorry! appeared weekly on Comic Book Resources. Topics ranged from short, satirical summaries of comic books ("Condensed Comic Classics") to fan fiction parodies.

== Comics ==
=== 2000–2010 ===
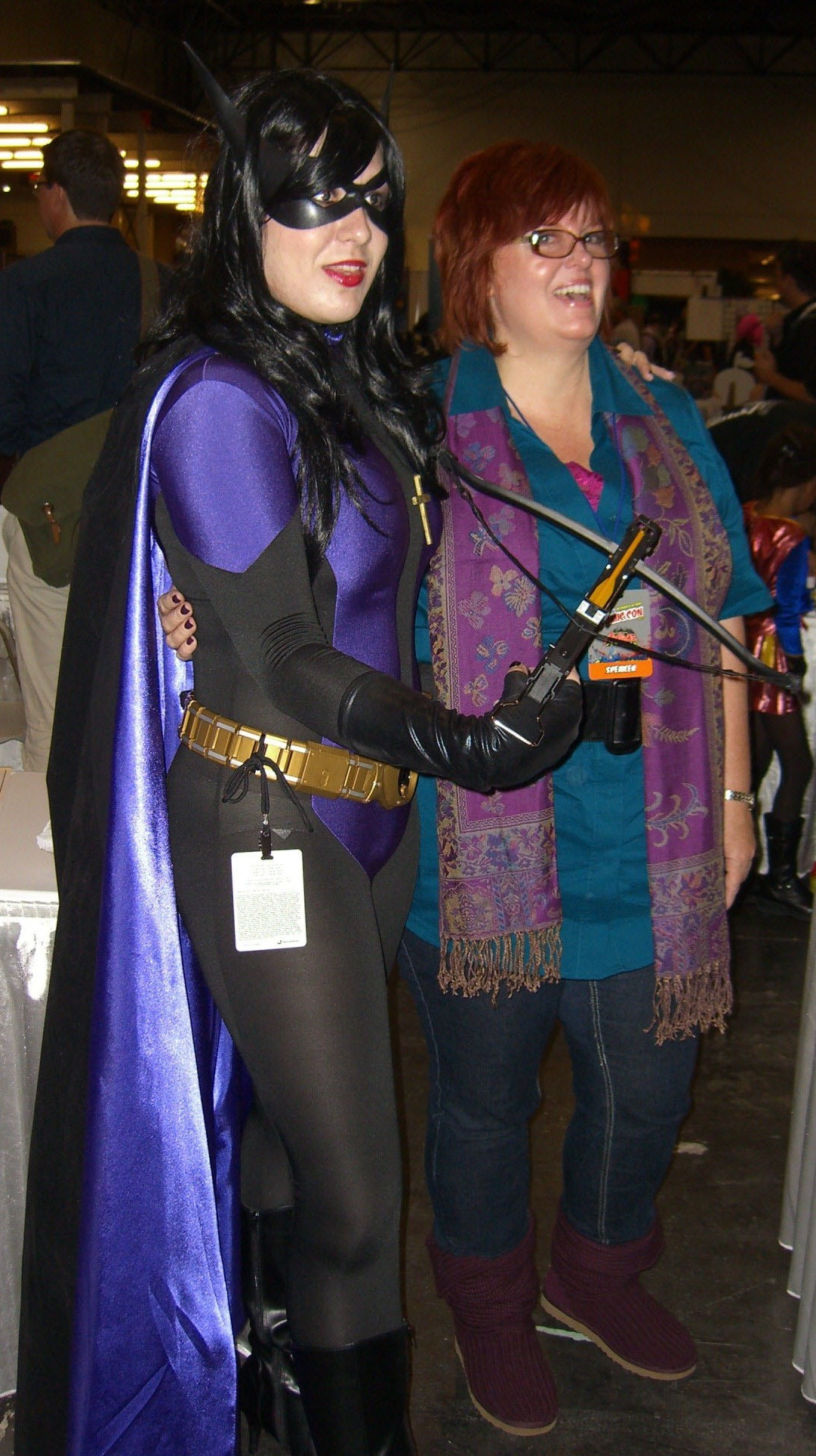
Simone posing with a fan dressed as Huntress, a character whom Simone wrote in Birds of Prey, at the New York Comic Con, October 9, 2010.

From 2001, Simone wrote Simpsons Comics for Bongo Comics, including an annual Treehouse of Horror special, and regular scripts for Bart Simpson Comics. Simone also penned many Sunday strips for the syndicated Simpsons comic strip.

Simone worked for Marvel Comics on Deadpool from 2003. After Deadpool was canceled and relaunched as Agent X, Simone continued as writer, but eventually left the project after a conflict with the series' editor. Simone returned to write the concluding arc to Agent X after the series' initial cancellation.

Simone moved to DC Comics, where she wrote Birds of Prey in 2003 from issue #56, which featured an all-female team: Oracle, Black Canary, Huntress, and Lady Blackhawk.

Simone wrote Action Comics with John Byrne as pencil artist. In 2005 Simone wrote the Villains United limited series – part of the Infinite Crisis crossover – starring Catman. She also wrote a two-issue story arc that focused on Hawk and Dove for a rebooted Teen Titans series with Rob Liefeld as artist. Simone supported Liefeld in the face of public criticism of his art.

Simone's Villains United limited series spin-off Secret Six followed in 2005, which led to an ongoing series in September 2008, and multiple DC crossovers prior to the September 2011 New 52 relaunch.

Other works by Simone include Action Comics, The Legion, Rose and Thorn, WildStorm's Gen^{13}, and an Atom series based on ideas by Grant Morrison and penciled by John Byrne and Mike Norton. She wrote a creator-owned project about a retirement community of super-heroes, Welcome to Tranquility, for WildStorm, and contributed to Tori Amos's Comic Book Tattoo.

In 2007 Simone took over writing duties on Wonder Woman from issue #14. To date, Simone is Wonder Woman's longest-running female writer. In 2010, she became the writer of Birds of Prey.

She returned to Welcome to Tranquility for a second limited series in 2010. In 2011, Simone and Ethan Van Sciver wrote The Fury of Firestorm as part of The New 52. Later that year, Secret Six was canceled and Simone left Birds of Prey and Firestorm.

=== 2011–2020 ===
In 2011, Simone contributed to The Power Within, a Kickstarter-funded comic book that focuses on teen bullying.

As part of DC Comics' New 52 initiative, Simone wrote a new Batgirl title starring Barbara Gordon, which debuted in 2011. Simone introduced Alysia Yeoh, the first transgender character written in a contemporary context in a mainstream comic book.

In 2012, news outlets reported that her exclusivity deal with DC had terminated and she was leaving the Batgirl title as well as DC Comics. In 2012, Simone revealed that she was fired from Batgirl by the book's new editor Brian Cunningham. After fan protests, Simone returned to Batgirl as writer. Simone was replaced in 2014 as writer for Batgirl, with significant retcons made to the character's backstory following Simone's departure.

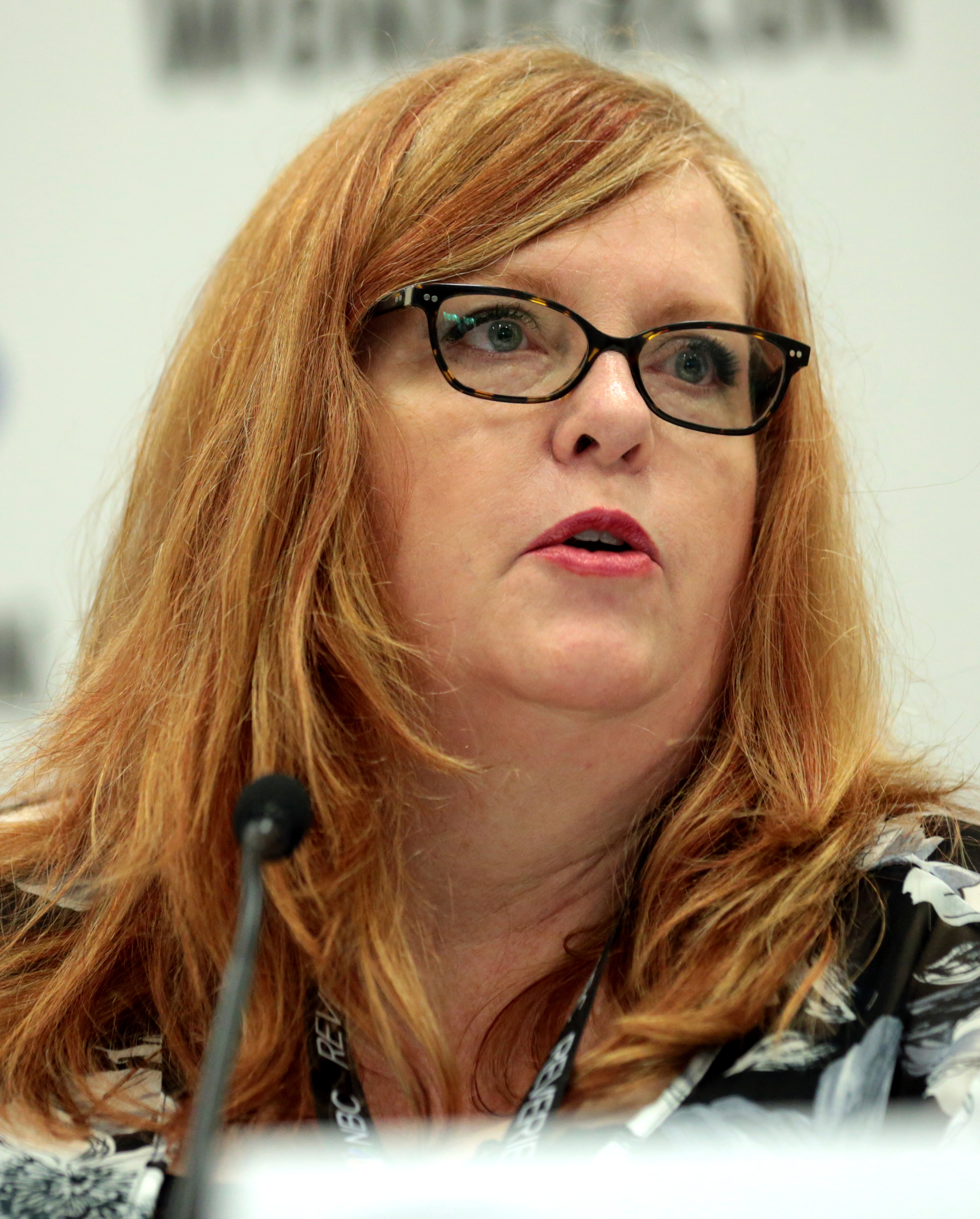
Simone at the 2018 WonderCon

In 2013, DC Comics published The Movement by Simone and artist Freddie Williams II, which Simone called "a book about power – who owns it, who uses it, who suffers from its abuse." Also in 2013 Simone wrote a Red Sonja series for Dynamite.

Also in 2013, Simone was listed first on IGN's list of the "Best Tweeters in Comics" for the "enthusiasm and thoughtfulness" of her Twitter posts.

In 2014–2015, Simone wrote the Lara Croft series Tomb Raider for Dark Horse Comics, set between the 2013 video game reboot and its sequel Rise of the Tomb Raider.

Oni Press published her graphic novel Seven Days with art by Jose Luis in 2020 as part of an initiative to launch a new Catalyst Prime superhero universe.

=== 2021–present ===
In Nightwing #110, Tom Taylor introduced a bear named in her honor, Gail the Slayer, as a tongue in cheek reference to their continued mock feud.

In March 2024, Simone was announced as the first solo female writer for Uncanny X-Men. In April 2025, it was announced that she will write a Rebel Moon prequel series for Titan Comics featuring the film's cyborg sword master Nemesis.

In July 2025, she was named a Special Ambassador for the Inkwell Awards.

In March 2026, the Marvel Comics character Gail Arakawa was named after Simone, and Hiromu Arakawa.

== Animation ==
In 2005, Simone wrote the Justice League Unlimited episode "Double Date", which featured Question, Huntress, Green Arrow and Black Canary. Originally, Simone intended the episode to feature Batgirl, but animation rights for the character were unavailable.

In 2007, Simone wrote an episode of GameTap's Revisioned: Tomb Raider, entitled "Pre-Teen Raider".

In 2010, Simone wrote the Batman: The Brave and the Bold episode "The Mask of Matches Malone!", which featured the Birds of Prey.

In 2019, Simone wrote the My Little Pony: Friendship Is Magic episode "Between Dark and Dawn".

== Novels ==
In 2023, Orbit Books announced that Simone would write an original Red Sonja novel, titled Red Sonja: Consumed, published in November 2024.

== Awards and honors ==
Simone is notable for being one of the most influential women in the comic book industry. Her blog "Women In Refrigerators" raised awareness of the representation of women in comics. Simone believes most female comic characters are targeted at male audiences through oversexualization, and advocates for the creation of female characters that are as powerful, appealing, and commercially viable as male characters, something she strives to achieve in her own work.

- Eisner Award Winner: Tori Amos Comic Book Tattoo (anthology) 2009, Best Anthology (Group Award)
- Harvey Award Winner: Tori Amos Comic Book Tattoo (anthology) 2009, Best Anthology (Group Award)
- Women Cartoonists Hall Of Fame, 2009, Friends of Lulu.
- Outstanding Comic Book Nominee: Secret Six, 2010, GLAAD Media Award
- Outstanding Comic Book Nominee: Secret Six, 2012, GLAAD Media Award
- True Believers Comic Award for Roll of Honor/Comic Excellence, 2014, London Film and Comic Con
- Inkpot Award, 2017, San Diego Comic-Con

== Notable works ==
=== Comics ===
==== Bongo Comics ====
- Simpson's Comics #50 "Li'l Goodfellas", Bongo Comics, August 2000
  - Simpsons Comics Royale reprinted, Bongo Comics, March 2001
    - Simpson's Comics #73, reprinted, Bongo Comics, Titan Magazines, October 2002
      - The Best of the Simpsons#29 reprinted, Bongo Comics, Titan Magazines, April 2006
- Simpson's Comics #83, "...So You Want To Work for Globex, Huh?", Bongo Comics, August 2003
  - Simpson's Comics Jam Packed Jamboree reprinted, Bongo/HarperCollins, April 2006
    - The Best of the Simpsons #37 reprinted, Bongo Comics, Titan Magazines April 2007

==== Dark Horse Comics ====
- Leaving Megalopolis (with Jim Calafiore, 2014, Dark Horse Comics, ISBN 978-1-61655-559-7.)

==== DC/Vertigo/Wildstorm ====
- Rose and Thorn #1–6 (with Adriana da Silva Melo, DC Comics, February – July 2004)
- Action Comics #827–831 & 833–835 (with John Byrne, DC Comics, July – November 2005 & January – March 2006) collected as:
  - Superman: Strange Attractors (192 pages, May 2006, ISBN 1-4012-0917-3)
- Villains United #1–6 (with Dale Eaglesham, DC Comics, July – December 2005) collected as:
  - Villains United (144 pages, January 2006, ISBN 1-4012-0838-X)
- Secret Six #1–6 (with Brad Walker, DC Comics, July 2006 – January 2007) collected as:
  - Six Degrees of Devastation (144 pages, March 2007, ISBN 1-4012-1231-X)
- Birds of Prey #56–90, 92–108 (DC Comics, August 2003 – July 2007) collected as:
  - Of Like Minds (with Ed Benes, collects Birds of Prey #56–61, 144 pages, March 2004, ISBN 1-4012-0192-X)
  - Sensei & Student (with Ed Benes, collects Birds of Prey #62–68, 168 pages, February 2005, ISBN 1-4012-0434-1)
  - Between Dark & Dawn (with Ed Benes, collects Birds of Prey #69–75, 176 pages, March 2006, ISBN 1-4012-0940-8)
  - The Battle Within (with Joe Bennett and Ed Benes, collects Birds of Prey #76–85, 240 pages, October 2006, ISBN 1-4012-1096-1)
  - Perfect Pitch (with Joe Bennett and Paulo Siqueira, collects Birds of Prey #86–90 and #92–95, 224 pages, February 2007, ISBN 1-4012-1191-7)
  - Blood and Circuits (with Nicola Scott, Paulo Siqueira and James Raiz, collects Birds of Prey #96–103, 208 pages, August 2007, ISBN 1-4012-1371-5)
  - Dead of Winter (with Nicola Scott, collects Birds of Prey #104–108, 128 pages, February 2008, ISBN 1-4012-1641-2)
- Welcome to Tranquility #1–12 (with Neil Googe, Wildstorm, February 2007 – January 2008) collected as:
  - Volume 1 (collects Welcome to Tranquility #1–6, 160 pages, December 2007, ISBN 1-4012-1516-5)
  - Volume 2 (collects Welcome to Tranquility #7–12, 144 pages, May 2008, ISBN 1-4012-1773-7)
- The All-New Atom #1–15, 17–18, 20 (DC Comics, September 2006 – April 2008) collected as:
  - My Life in Miniature (collects The All New Atom #1–6, 160 pages, ISBN 1-4012-1325-1)
  - Future/Past (collects The All New Atom #7–11, 128 pages, ISBN 1-4012-1568-8)
  - The Hunt For Ray Palmer (collects The All New Atom #12–16, 128 pages, ISBN 978-1-4012-1782-2)
  - Small Wonder (collects The All New Atom #17–18 and #20–25, 198 pages, ISBN 978-1-4012-1996-3)
- JLA: Classified 2004 (DC Comics, January 2008) collected as:
  - The Hypothetical Woman (with Jose Luis Garcia-Lopez, Klaus Janson, and Sean Phillips, collects JLA: Classified #16–21, January 2006 – May 2006, ≈134 pages, softcover, January 2008, ISBN 1401216293)
- Wonder Woman vol. 3 #14–44, vol. 1 #600, & vol 5 #750 (DC Comics, January 2008 – July 2010) collected as:
  - The Circle (with Terry Dodson, collects Wonder Woman #14–19, January – June 2008, 144 pages, hardcover, November 2008, ISBN 1-4012-1932-2; trade paperback, September 2009, ISBN 1-4012-2011-8)
  - Ends of the Earth (with Aaron Lopresti, collects Wonder Woman #20–25, July – December 2008, 144 pages, hardcover, March 2009, ISBN 1-4012-2136-X)
  - Rise of the Olympian (with Aaron Lopresti, collects Wonder Woman #26–33, January – August 2009, 208 pages, November 2009, ISBN 1-4012-2513-6)
  - Warkiller (with Aaron Lopresti, collects Wonder Woman #34–39, September 2009 – February 2010, 144 pages, May 2010, ISBN 1-4012-2779-1)
  - Contagion (with Aaron Lopresti, Chris Batista, and Nicola Scott, collects Wonder Woman #40–44, March 2010 – July 2010, 128 pages, October 2010, ISBN 1-4012-2920-4)
- Secret Six #1–14, 16–36, DC Comics, September 2008 – August 2011 collected as:
  - Unhinged (with Nicola Scott and Doug Hazlewood, collects Secret Six #1–7, 144 pages, August 2009, ISBN 1-4012-2327-3)
  - Depths (with Nicola Scott and Carlos Rodriguez, collects Secret Six #8–14, 168 pages, April 2010, ISBN 1-4012-2599-3)
  - Danse Macabre (with Jim Calafiore, Peter Nguyen and Doug Hazlewood, collects Secret Six #15–18 and Suicide Squad #67, written by John Ostrander, 128 pages, October 2010, ISBN 1-4012-2904-2)
  - Cat's in the Cradle (with Jim Calafiore, R.B. Silva and Alexandre Palamaro, collects Secret Six #19–24, 144 pages, January 2011, ISBN 1-4012-3021-0)
  - The Reptile Brain (with Jim Calafiore and Pete Woods, collects Secret Six #25–29 and Action Comics #896, written by Paul Cornell, 144 pages, May 2011, ISBN 1-4012-3166-7)
  - The Darkest House (with Jim Calafiore, Matthew Clark and Ron Randall, collects Secret Six #30–36 and Doom Patrol #19, written by Keith Giffen, 176 pages, January 2012, ISBN 1401233627)
- Birds of Prey vol. 2, #1–13 (DC Comics, July 2010 – August 2011) collected as:
  - End Run (with Ed Benes, Adriana Melo, and Alvin Lee, collects Birds of Prey #1–6, July 2010 – January 2011, 160 pages, hardcover, May 2011, ISBN 1-4012-3131-4;)
  - The Death of Oracle (with Ardian Syaf, Guillem March, Inaki Miranda, Pere Perez, Jesus Saiz, collects Birds of Prey #7–13, February – August 2011, 200 pages, hardcover, October 2011, ISBN 1-4012-3275-2)
- Welcome to Tranquility: One Foot in the Grave #1–6 (with Horacio Dominguez, Wildstorm, September 2010 – February 2011) collected as:
  - Welcome To Tranquility: One Foot in the Grave (collects Welcome to Tranquility: One Foot in the Grave #1–6, 144 pages, July 2011, ISBN 1-4012-3175-6)
- Batgirl 2011 volumes 1–5, #1–34 (DC Comics, July 2012 – December 2014) collected as:
  - The Darkest Reflection (with Ardian Syaf and Vicente Cifuentes, collects Batgirl (The New 52) #1–6, September 2011 – February 2012, 144 pages, hardcover, July 2012, ISBN 1401238149)
  - Knightfall Descends (with Ardian Syaf and Ed Benes, collects Batgirl (The New 52) #7–13 and 0, March 2012 – October 2012, 192 pages, hardcover, February 2013, ISBN 1401238165)
  - Death of the Family (with Admira Wijayadi, Vicente Cifuentes, Mark Irwin, Johnathan Glapion, Julius Gopez, Greg Capullo, Daniel Sampere, Ed Benes, Scott Snyder, and Ray Fawkes; collects Batgirl (The New 52) #14–19 and Annual #1, Batman #17, and Young Romance #1; November 2012 – Apr 2013, 224 pages, hardcover, October 2013, ISBN 1401242596)
  - Wanted (with Derlis Santacruz, Fernando Pasarin, and Daniel Sampere; collected as Batgirl (The New 52) #20–26 and Batman: The Dark Knight #23.1; May 2013 – December 2013, 192 pages, hardcover, May 2014, ISBN 140124629X)
  - Deadline (with Marguerite Bennet, Jonathan Glapion, Fernando Pasarin, and Robert Gill; collects Batgirl (The New 52) #27–34 and Annual #2, January 2014 – August 2014, 256 pages, hardcover, December 2014, ISBN 1401250416)
- Clean Room vol. 1, #1-18 (Vertigo Comics, December 2015 – June 2017)

==== Dynamite Entertainment ====
- Red Sonja Vol 2 #0–18 (Dynamite Entertainment, February 2014 – October 2014) collected as:
  - Queen of the Plagues (with Walter Geovani, Adriano Lucas, and Simon Bowland, collects Red Sonja Vol 2 #1–6, July 2013 – December 2013, 180 pages, softcover, February 2014, ISBN 1606904817)
  - Art of Blood and Fire (with Walter Geovani, collects Red Sonja Vol 2 #7–12 and 0, January 2014 – June 2014, 176 pages, softcover, October 2014, ISBN 978-1606905296)
  - The Forgiving of Monsters (with Walter Geovani, collects Red Sonja Vol 2 #13–18, July 2014 – May 2015, 160 pages, softcover, Unpublished, ISBN 1606906011)
- Legends of Red Sonja volume 1, #1–5 (Dynamite Entertainment, August 2014) collected as:
  - Legends of Red Sonja (anthology, collects Legends of Red Sonja #1–5, November 2013 – March 2014, 152 pages, softcover, August 2014, ISBN 978-1606905258)

==== Marvel Comics ====
- Deadpool #65–69 (Marvel Comics, May – September 2002)
- Agent X #1–7, 13–15 (Marvel Comics, September 2002 – March 2003 & November – December 2003)
- Marvelous Adventures of Gus Beezer (Marvel Comics)
  - Spider-Man (with Jason Lethcoe, May 2003)
  - Hulk (with Jason Lethcoe, May 2003)
  - X-Men (with Jason Lethcoe, May 2003)
  - Spider-Man (with Gurihiru, February 2004)
- Domino #1-10 (with David Baldeon, Marvel Comics, April 2018 - January 2019) collected as:
  - Domino Vol. 1: Killer Instinct (112 pages, collects Domino #1-6, November 2018, ISBN 978-1-302-91298-7)
  - Domino Vol. 2: Soldier of Fortune (128 pages, collects Domino #7-10 and Domino Annual, March 2019, ISBN 978-1302914844)
- Domino: Hotshots #1-5 (with David Baldeon, Marvel Comics, March - July 2019) collected as:
  - Domino: Hotshots (112 pages, September 2019, ISBN 978-1-302-91833-0)

=== Television ===
- Justice League Unlimited (2005)
  - "Double Date"
- Revisioned: Tomb Raider (2007)
  - "Pre-Teen Raider"
- Batman: The Brave and the Bold (2010)
  - "The Mask of Matches Malone!"
- My Little Pony: Friendship Is Magic (2019)
  - "Between Dark and Dawn"
- Strawberry Shortcake: Berry in the Big City (2024)
  - "Crushing the Cosplay"

=== Films ===
- Wonder Woman (2009)
- Red Sonja: Queen of Plagues (2016)

== Notes ==
Preceded by Frank Tieri	Deadpool writer 2002	Succeeded by Fabian Nicieza (Cable and Deadpool); Daniel Way (Deadpool vol. 2)
Preceded by Gilbert Hernandez	Birds of Prey writer 2003–2007	Succeeded by Tony Bedard
Preceded by Dan Abnett; Andy Lanning	The Legion writer 2004	Succeeded by Mark Waid (Legion of Super-Heroes vol. 5)
Preceded by Chuck Austen	Action Comics writer 2005–2006	Succeeded by Geoff Johns
Preceded by Chris Claremont	Gen^{13} writer 2006–2007	Succeeded by Simon Oliver
Preceded by Jodi Picoult	Wonder Woman writer 2008–2010	Succeeded by J. Michael Straczynski
Preceded by Tony Bedard	Birds of Prey writer 2010–2011	Succeeded by Duane Swierczynski
Preceded by Bryan Q. Miller	Batgirl writer 2011–2014	Succeeded by Cameron Stewart; Brenden Fletcher
Preceded by Dwayne McDuffie	Firestorm writer 2011–2012 (with Ethan Van Sciver)	Succeeded by Joe Harris; Ethan Van Sciver
Preceded by Brandon Jerwa	Red Sonja writer 2013–2015	Succeeded by Marguerite Bennett
