= Red Sonja =

Fictional character

- Textless cover of Red Sonja #16 (July 2015). Art by Ed Benes.

Publication information
- Publisher: Marvel Comics (1973–2007); Dynamite Entertainment (2005–present)
- First appearance: As The Red Sonja: Conan the Barbarian #23 (February 1973); As Mary Jane Watson: Marvel Team-Up #79 (March 1979)
- Created by: Roy Thomas; Barry Windsor-Smith

In-story information
- Partnerships: Conan; Spider-Man
- Notable aliases: Mary Jane Watson

The Red Sonja is a sword-and-sorcery character created by writer Roy Thomas and artist Barry Windsor-Smith for American comic books published by Marvel Comics in 1973, partially inspired by Robert E. Howard's character Red Sonya of Rogatino. A warrior from the Hyborian Age of Earth-616, she was often partnered with Conan the Barbarian.

Marvel Comics published stories featuring The Red Sonja until 1995. In 2005, Dynamite Entertainment began publishing stories of the heroine, during which the original Sonja was killed and replaced by a "reincarnation", who once met Spider-Man in 2007. The series was rebooted by writer Gail Simone in 2013, telling an altered version of Red Sonja's early life story via flashbacks. Subsequent writers of Red Sonja have included Amy Chu, Mark Russell, Luke Lieberman, Jimmy Palmiotti, and Amanda Conner, among others.

The Red Sonja has appeared in numerous titles, both as a solo protagonist and together with Conan, as well as in crossovers with characters from Marvel Comics and Dynamite Comics. A total of six Red Sonja novels were published from 1981 to 1983 by David C. Smith and Richard L. Tierney. A Red Sonja feature film, starring Brigitte Nielsen in the title role, was released in 1985, while a reboot film starring Matilda Lutz was released in 2025.

Sonja's signature clothing is her bikini armor, consisting typically of scale mail. In 2011, Red Sonja was ranked first in Comics Buyer's Guide's "100 Sexiest Women in Comics" list.

== History ==
=== Marvel Comics (1973–1995) ===
Red Sonja was created by writer Roy Thomas and artist Barry Windsor-Smith for Marvel Comics in 1973, partially based on Red Sonya, a female swashbuckler from "The Shadow of the Vulture".

Red Sonja debuted in Marvel's Conan the Barbarian #23 (1973). Thomas created a new origin story and transposed the timeline from the 16th century of Howard's original Red Sonya to the Hyborian Age, another Howard creation, to have Sonja interact with Conan the Barbarian. In 1975, Marvel Comics published the first issue of Marvel Feature vol. 2 that was headlined by Red Sonja. The seven issues featuring Red Sonja were written by Roy Thomas and Bruce Jones. From #2 on, Frank Thorne provided the art for the series. In 1977, the character received her own, self-titled series. The fifteen issues of Red Sonja were written by Clair Noto and Thomas, with art by Frank Thorne (#1–11), and later on, pencils by John Buscema (#12–13, 15) and Sal Buscema (#14), who were inked by Joe Rubinstein, Al Milgrom and Tony De Zuniga.

Red Sonja's origin story was told in the story "The Day of the Sword" in the Marvel magazine Kull and the Barbarians #3 (1975), written by Roy Thomas and Doug Moench and illustrated by Howard Chaykin. The same story was later redrawn by Dick Giordano and Terry Austin and published in the magazine The Savage Sword of Conan #78 (July 1982). In this version, Red Sonja lives with her family in the Western Hyrkanian steppes. When she is 21, a group of mercenaries kills her family and burns down their house. Sonja attempts to defend herself, but cannot lift her brother's sword. She is raped by the leader of the group. After managing to escape from the burning farm, the red goddess Scáthach appears to her and gives her incredible fighting skills, on the condition on never allow a man to love her, unless he defeats her in fair combat. In the story "Sword of the She-Devil" Marvel Team-Up #79 (December 1979), Red Sonja is reborn in the present-day of Earth-616 when her sword is found by her descendant/reincarnation Mary Jane "MJ" Watson (love interest of Peter Parker / Spider-Man).

In 1983, Marvel Comics published a second Red Sonja series, a two-issue story written by Christy Marx and Roy Thomas, with art by Tony DeZuniga and Ernie Colón. The story also featured an appearance by the Robert E. Howard heroine Valeria.

That same year, Marvel launched a third series, running for thirteen issues. Writers included Tom DeFalco, Bill Mantlo, and Louise Simonson, with art by Mary Wilshire, Pat Broderick, and Rudy Nebres, among others.

In 1985, Marvel published a two-issue adaptation of the Red Sonja film starring Brigitte Nielsen. The adaptation was written by Louise Simonson and Mary Wilshire, with art by Mary Wilshire and Vince Colletta.

In 1987, Fred Blosser, with contribution of Roy Thomas, ordered most of the produced Marvel material, plus additional planned work, into an unified chronology, providing to Red Sonja a consistent canon.

In 1995, Marvel published the one-shot issue Red Sonja: Scavenger Hunt, written by Glenn Herdling and illustrated by Ken Lashley.

In 2007, Marvel teamed with Dynamite Comics to publish Spider-Man/Red Sonja, a five-issue series written by Michael Avon Oeming with art by Mel Rubi, in which Mary Jane "MJ" Watson again awakens as Red Sonja. The story is a direct sequel to the Marvel Team-Up story, and the graphic novel release included the original story in addition to the five issue miniseries.

=== Dynamite Comics (2005–present) ===
In 2005, Dynamite Comics began publishing Red Sonja. The series debuted with an issue zero written by Michael Avon Oeming and Mike Carey and drawn by Mel Rubi. It depicts the original Sonja's death in issue #34. A new character of the same name, described as a reincarnation, takes her place from issue #35 through the series end at issue #80.

In 2013, Dynamite launched a second ongoing Red Sonja series, written by Gail Simone with art from Walter Geovani. Simone noted in interviews that her version was rebooted, showing the character's beginnings. Issue #1 of Simone's run was released in July 2013 to positive reviews. The series lasted 18 issues. After Simone's run, Dynamite launched a third Red Sonja series in January 2016. The book featured Marguerite Bennett as writer and a redesign of the character by artist Nicola Scott. That series lasted six issues.

In December 2017, a new Red Sonja comic series debuted with a zero issue priced at 25 cents by writer Amy Chu with art by Carlos Gomez. The series ran for 25 issues, ending in 2019.

In November 2019, a new series by writer Mark Russell and art by Mirko Colak debuted to positive critical reception, leading into a spinoff series called Killing Red Sonja. Russell left the series after issue 24 and was replaced with writer Luke Lieberman, with art by Drew Moss. The series ran 28 issues.

In mid-2021, Dynamite released the anthology Red Sonja: Black, White, Red. Each issue presents stories by different teams of artists and writers, including Kurt Busiek, Benjamin Dewey, Amanda Deibert, Cat Staggs, Mark Russell, and Bob Q. Also announced was a crossover with Project superpower. A sequel was released in November 2022 titled Vampirella vs. Red Sonja.

In February 2021, Dynamite released a series titled Sonjaversal, depicting Red Sonja meeting her multiversal counterparts. That same month, Amanda Conner and Jimmy Palmiotti co-wrote the series Invincible Red Sonja with artist Moritat.

In June 2021, the character appeared in Die!namite and Die!namite Lives. That same month, Dynamite Entertainment announced that a new series written by Mirka Andolfo and drawn by Giuseppe Cafaro would debut in September 2021. The first issue sold out its initial run of 32,000 copies, prompting a second printing.

In December 2021, it was announced that Red Sonja would appear in the sequel to Die!namite and Die!namite Lives called Die!namite Never Dies.

Hell Sonja, a spinoff from Sonjaversal, was released in January 2022. That same month, the Immortal Red Sonja series by writer Dan Abnett and artist Alessandro Miracolo was announced for April, which would depict Sonja in King Arthur's Camelot. In February 2022, Dynamite announced that it would debut Red Sitha in May, set ten years after Andolfo's storyline, following Red Sonja's adopted daughter, Sitha.

In March 2022, Dynamite announced another spinoff titled from Sonjaversal, Samurai Sonja, written by Jordan Clark with art by Pasquale Qualano. In August, a one-shot fairy tale reimagining Red Sonja as Jack from Jack and the Beanstalk was released. Unbreakable Red Sonja was released in October 2022, and the crossover series Hell Sonja/Red Sonja was released in December the same year.

In April 2023, Dynamite announced that it would debut the next ongoing Red Sonja series by writer Torunn Grønbekk and artist Walter Geovani in celebration of the character's 50th anniversary. The first issue, released in July, featured dozens of variant covers by artists including Jim Cheung, Bryan Hitch, Mike Mignola, Joseph Michael Linsner, Jenny Frison, Frank Cho, and Kevin Eastman.

Savage Red Sonja by Dan Panosian and Alessio Petillo was released in November 2023, followed by Red Sonja: Empire of the Damned by Steve Niles and Alessandro Amoruso in April 2024. The sequel to Red Sonja: Birth of the She-devil called Red Sonja: Death and the Devil was released in September 2024. An alternate reality version of the character will debut in Sonja Reborn, set for release in August 2025. The series, written by Christopher Priest, will follow British diplomatic clerk Maggie Sutherland, who is transported from the 21st century to the world of Hyboria.

In February 2026, Dynamite announced Red Sonja Volume 8, Red Sonja: She-Devil With a Sword, would launch in May 2026, written by Rory McConville and drawn by Pablo de Bonis.

== Depiction of sexuality ==
=== Bikini armor ===
Most artists depict Red Sonja wearing a very brief "chainmail bikini" costume of scale armor, usually with boots and gauntlets. As originally drawn by Barry Windsor-Smith for "The Shadow of the Vulture" and "The Song of Red Sonja" in Conan the Barbarian issues 23 and 24 (1972), she wore a long-sleeved mail shirt and short pants of red silk.

As told by Roy Thomas in the introduction of Red Sonja Adventures Volume 1 (Dynamite Entertainment), Spanish artist Esteban Maroto submitted an uncommissioned illustration to him while Thomas was editing the magazine Savage Sword of Conan. The illustration featured a redesigned silver "metal bikini", which resembled fantasy costumes that other Maroto heroines sported in the 1970s. This illustration was printed for the first time in Jim Steranko's magazine Comixscene #5 in black and white. It was reprinted in Savage Sword of Conan #1, then in Marvel Treasury Edition #15 in color, and later restored and colored by José Villarrubia as an alternative cover for the Dynamite Entertainment edition of Red Sonja #2. Maroto drew her in this costume for a double page spread illustration in Savage Tales #3 and then for her first solo adventure in Savage Sword of Conan #1. John Buscema drew her in this costume in the same magazine and in issues 43, 44, and 48 of Conan the Barbarian (1974). Dick Giordano portrayed Sonja in the bikini for the first issue of Marvel Feature vol. 2 (Nov. 1975) before Frank Thorne took over from issue #2 (Jan. 1976).

=== Sexuality ===
In her original Marvel Comics version, Red Sonja was featured as having heterosexual orientation and made a vow of celibacy after the vision of the Red Goddess Scáthach ("You must never allow yourself to be loved by another man ..."). Later Marvel stories reframed Red Sonja's choice as a rejection of attachment and as a means of preserving her independence.

Dynamite Comics stories did not follow the strict celibacy rule, and in 2016, the writer Gail Simone indicated that Sonja was bisexual during her run. In 2020, the series Red Sonja: The Price of Blood by writer Luke Lieberman and artist Walter Geovani depicted Sonja as having slept with a woman, and in 2024, the novel Red Sonja: Consumed (written by Simone) portrays the character as having both male and female lovers.

== Comics bibliography ==
=== Marvel Comics ===
Publication	Issue	Writer	Artist	Collected edition *=not collected
Marvel Comics Feature (1975)	1–7	Roy Thomas, Bruce Jones	Frank Thorne, Esteban Maroto, Neal Adams, Dick Giordano	Adventures of Red Sonja Volume 1
Red Sonja (Vol. 1) (1977)	1–15	Roy Thomas, Clair Noto	Frank Thorne, John Buscema, Sal Buscema	Adventures of Red Sonja Volume 2 Adventures of Red Sonja Volume 3
Red Sonja (Vol. 2) (1983)	1–2	Christy Marx, Roy Thomas	Tony DeZuniga, Ernie Colon, Alan Kupperberg	*
Red Sonja (Vol. 3) (1983)	1–8	Tom DeFalco, Bill Mantlo, Louise Simonson	Dave Simons, May Wilshire, Pat Broderick, Rudy Nebres	*
Red Sonja (Vol. 3) (1983)	9–13	Louise Simonson, Mary Wilshire	Mary Wilshire	*
Red Sonja: The Movie (1985)	1–2	Louise Simonson, Mary Wilshire	Mary Wilshire, Vince Colletta	*
Red Sonja: Scavenger Hunt	1	Glenn Herdling	Ken Lashley	*

=== Other publishers ===
Title	Publisher	ISSUE	WRITER	ARTIST	COLLECTED EDITION
Red Sonja 3-D (1998)	Blackthorne	1	David Cody Weiss, Bobbi JG Weiss	Aaron Lopresti	*
Red Sonja: Death in Scarlet (1999)	Cross Plains	1	Roy Thomas	Steve Lightle	*

=== Dynamite Entertainment ===
==== Ongoing series ====
Title	Issue	Writer	Artist	Collected edition
Red Sonja: She Devil With a Sword (2005)	0–80	Mike Carey, Michael Avon Oeming	Mel Rubi	Red Sonja: She-Devil With a Sword, Vol. 1 Red Sonja: She-Devil With a Sword, Vol. 2: Arrowsmith Red Sonja: She-Devil With a Sword, Vol. 3: The Rise of Kulan Gath Red Sonja: She-Devil With a Sword, Vol. 4: Animals & More Red Sonja: She-Devil With a Sword, Vol. 5: World on Fire Red Sonja: She-Devil With a Sword, Vol. 6: Death Red Sonja: She-Devil With a Sword, Vol. 7: Born Again Red Sonja: She-Devil With a Sword, Vol. 8: Blood Dynasty Red Sonja: She-Devil With a Sword, Vol. 9: War Season Red Sonja: She-Devil With a Sword, Vol. 10: Machines of Empire Red Sonja: She-Devil With a Sword, Vol. 11: Echoes of War Red Sonja: She-Devil With a Sword, Vol. 12: Swords Against the Jade Kingdom Red Sonja: She-Devil With a Sword, Vol. 13: The Long March Home Red Sonja: She-devil with a Sword Omnibus Volume 1 Red Sonja: She-devil with a Sword Omnibus Volume 2 Red Sonja: She-devil with a Sword Omnibus Volume 3 Red Sonja: She-devil with a Sword Omnibus Volume 4 Red Sonja: She-devil with a Sword Omnibus Volume 5
Queen Sonja (2009)	1–35	Joshua Ortega, Arvid Nelson, Luke Lieberman	Mel Rubi, Jackson Herbert, Edgar Salazar, Fritz Casas, Milton Estevam	Queen Sonja Volume 1 Queen Sonja Volume 2: The Red Queen Queen Sonja Volume 3: Coming of Age Queen Sonja Volume 4: Son of Set Queen Sonja Volume 5: Ascendency Queen Sonja Volume 6: Heavy is the Crown Queen Sonja Omnibus Volume 1
Red Sonja (Vol. 2) (2013)	0–18	Gail Simone	Walter Geovani	Red Sonja Volume 1: Queen of Plagues Red Sonja Volume 2: The Art of Blood and Fire Red Sonja Volume 3: The Forgiving of Monsters The Complete Gail Simone Red Sonja Omnibus
Red Sonja (Vol. 3) (2016)	1–6	Marguerite Bennett	Aneke	Red Sonja: The Falcon Throne
Red Sonja (Vol. 4) (2016)	0–25	Amy Chu	Carlos Gomez	Red Sonja: Worlds Away Volume 1 Red Sonja: Worlds Away Volume 2 Red Sonja: Worlds Away Volume 3 Red Sonja: Worlds Away Volume 4 Red Sonja: Worlds Away Volume 5
Red Sonja (Vol. 5) (2019–2022)	1–28	Mark Russell, Luke Lieberman	Bob Quinn, Alessandro Miracolo, Drew Moss	Red Sonja Vol. 1: Scorched Earth Red Sonja Vol. 2: The Queen's Gambit Red Sonja Vol. 3: Children's Crusade Red Sonja Vol. 4: Angel of Death
Red Sonja (Vol. 6) (2021)	1–12	Mirka Andolfo	Giuseppe Cafaro	Red Sonja Vol.1: Mother
Red Sonja (Vol. 7) (2023)	1–18	Torunn Gronbekk	Walter Geovani	Red Sonja Vol. 1: His Master's Voice Red Sonja Vol. 2: The Master's Return Red Sonja Vol. 3: The Master Falls
Red Sonja (Vol. 8) (2026)	1–	Rory McConville	Pablo De Bonis	*

==== Limited series ====
Title	Issue	Writer	Artist	Collected edition
Red Sonja vs. Thulsa Doom (2005)	1–4	Luke Lieberman, Peter David	Will Conrad	Red Sonja vs. Thulsa Doom
Red Sonja: She Devil With a Sword Annual (2005)	1–4	Michael Avon Oeming, Christos N. Gage, Daniel Brereton, Scott Beatty	Stephen Sadowski, Pablo Marcos, Adriano Batista, Daniel Brereton, Joseph Menna	Red Sonja Travels Volume 2
Red Sonja/Claw (2006)	1–4	John Layman	Andy Smith	Red Sonja/Claw: Devil's Hands
Savage Red Sonja: Queen of the Frozen Wastes (2006)	1–4	Frank Cho, Doug Murray	Homs	Savage Red Sonja: Queen of the Frozen Wastes
Sword of Red Sonja: Doom of the Gods (2007)	1–4	Luke Lieberman	Lui Antonio	Sword of Red Sonja: Doom of the Gods
Giant Size Red Sonja (2007)	1–2	Michael Avon Oeming, Roy Thomas	Ron Adrian, John Buscema, Howard Chaykin, Wendy Pini, Frank Thorne	Red Sonja Travels Volume 2 Savage Tales Of Red Sonja
Savage Tales (2007)	1–5 7–8,10	Ron Marz, Michael Avon Oemin, Christos Gage, Joshua Ortega, Vito Delsante, Mike Leib	Adriano Batista, Ron Adrian, Joyce Chin, Stephen Sadowski, Walter Geovani, Adriano Batista, Lui Antonio, Pablo Marcos, Diego Bernard	Savage Tales Of Red Sonja
Red Sonja: Wrath of the Gods (2010)	1–5	Luke Lieberman, Ethan Ryker	Walter Geovani	Red Sonja: Wrath of the Gods
Red Sonja: Revenge of the Gods (2011)	1–5	Luke Lieberman	Daniel Sampere	Red Sonja: Revenge of the Gods
Prophecy (2012)	1–7	Ron Marz	Walter Geovani	Prophecy
Red Sonja: Atlantis Rises (2012)	1–4	Luke Lieberman	Max Dunbar	Red Sonja: Atlantis Rises
Legends of Red Sonja (2013)	1–5	Gail Simone, various	Various	Legends of Red Sonja
Red Sonja: Unchained (2013)	1–4	Peter V. Brett	Jack Jadson	Red Sonja: Unchained
Red Sonja: Black Tower (2014)	1–4	Frank Tieri	Cezar Razek	Red Sonja: Black Tower
Red Sonja: Vulture's Circle (2014)	1–5	Nancy A. Collins, Luke Lieberman	Fritz Casas	Red Sonja: Vulture's Circle
Swords of Sorrow (2015)	1–5	Gail Simone	Sergio Davila	Swords of Sorrow
Legenderry: A Steampunk Adventure	1–7	Bill Willingham	Sergio Davila	Legenderry: A Steampunk Adventure
Legenderry Red Sonja (2015)	1–5	Marc Andreyko	Aneke	Legenderry Red Sonja: A Steampunk Adventure Vol. 1
Legenderry Red Sonja (Vol. 2) (2018)	1–5	Marc Andreyko	Igor Lima	Legenderry Red Sonja: A Steampunk Adventure Vol. 2
Red Sonja: Birth of the She-Devil (2019)	1–4	Luke Lieberman	Sergio Fernandez Davila	Red Sonja: Birth of the She-Devil
Killing Red Sonja (2020)	1–5	Mark Russell, Bryce Ingman	Craig Rousseau	Killing Red Sonja
Red Sonja: The Price of Blood (2020)	1–3	Luke Lieberman	Walter Geovani	Red Sonja: The Price of Blood
Sonjaversal (2021)	1–10	Christopher Hastings	Pasquale Qualano	Sonjaversal Vol.1Sonjaversal Vol.2
The Invincible Red Sonja (2021)	1–10	Jimmy Palmiotti, Amanda Conner	Moritat	Invincible Red Sonja
Red Sonja: Black, White, Red (2021)	1–8	Various	Various	Red Sonja: Black, White, Red Vol. 1Red Sonja: Black, White, Red Vol. 2
Immortal Red Sonja (2022)	1–10	Dan Abnett	Alessandro Miracolo, Alessandro Ranaldi	Immortal Red Sonja Vol. 1 Immortal Red Sonja Vol. 2
Unbreakable Red Sonja (2022)	1–5	Jim Zub	Giovanni Valletta	Unbreakable Red Sonja
Savage Red Sonja (2023)	1–5	Dan Panosian	Alessio Petillo	Savage Red Sonja: Devil in the Sand
Red Sonja: Death and the Devil (2024)	1–4	Luke Lieberman	Alberto Locatelli	Red Sonja: Death and the Devil
Sonja Reborn (2025)	1–6	Christopher Priest	Alessandro Miracolo	*

==== One Shots ====
Title	Issue	Writer	Artist	Collected edition
Red Sonja: One More Day (2006)		Jimmy Palmiotti, Justin Gray	Liam Sharp	Red Sonja Travels Volume 1
Red Sonja: Monster Isle (2006)		Roy Thomas	Pablo Marcos	Red Sonja Travels Volume 1
Red Sonja Goes East (2006)		Ron Marz	Joe Ng	Red Sonja Travels Volume 1
Red Sonja: Vacant Shell (2007)		Rick Remender	Paul Renaud	Red Sonja Travels Volume 1
Red Sonja: Deluge (2010)		Dan Brereton	Cris Bolson	Red Sonja Travels Volume 2
Red Sonja: Break the Skin (2011)		Jen Van Meter	Caesar Rodriguez	Red Sonja Travels Volume 2
Red Sonja: Blue (2011)		Peter Brett	Walter Geovani	Red Sonja: Unchained
Red Sonja: Raven (2012)		Marc Mason	Lui Antonio	Red Sonja Travels Volume 2
Red Sonja: Sanctuary (2014)		Marc Mason	Noah Solanga	Red Sonja Travels Volume 2
Red Sonja and Cub (2014)		Jim Zub	Jonathan Lau	Red Sonja Travels Volume 2
Red Sonja: Berserker (2014)		Nancy Collin	Fritz Casas	Red Sonja Travels Volume 2
Li'l Sonja (2014)		Jim Zub	Joel Carroll	*
Red Sonja #100 (2015)		Gail Simone, Roy Thomas, Luke Lieberman, Eric Trautmann, Michael Avon Oeming	Sergio Davila, Pablo Marcos, Dave Acosta, Taki Soma, Noah Salonga	*
Red Sonja: 1973 (2015)		Cullen Bunn, Eric Trautmann, Roy Thomas, Luke Lieberman, Gail Simone	Dave Acosta, Rich Buckler	*
Altered States: Red Sonja (2015)		Brandon Jerwa	Juanan Ramirez	*
Red Sonja: The Long Walk to Oblivion (2017)		Amy Chu, Erik Burnham	Carlos Gomez, Tom Mandrake	Red Sonja: Worlds Away Volume 2
Red Sonja: Holiday Special (2018)		Amy Chu, Roy Thomas	Ricardo Jamie, Frank Thorne	*
Red Sonja: Halloween Special (2018)		Various	Various	*
Red Sonja: The Ballad of the Red Goddess (2018)		Roy Thomas	Esteban Maroto, Santi Casas	*
Red Sonja: Lord of Fools (2019)		Mark Russell	Bob Q, Katie O'Meara	*
Savage Tales: Red Sonja Halloween Special (2019)		Mark Russell	Jacob Edgar	*
Red Sonja 1982 (2021)		Amy Chu	Eric Blake	*
Red Sonja: Valentine's Special (2021)		Bill Willingham	Giuseppe Cafaro	*
Red Sonja: 2021 Holiday Special		Mirka Andolfo, Luca Blengino	Zulema Lavina	*
Red Sonja: Valentine's Day Special (2022)		Chuck Brown	Lee Ferguson	*
Red Sonja Fairy Tales (2022)		Jordan Clark	Andres Labrada	*
Red Sonja: Noir (2025)		David Avallone	Edu Menna	*
Red Sonja New Year's Special 2025		Dan Panosian	Valeria Burzo	*
Red Sonja Noir: The Plunder & The Princess (2026)		David Avallone	Edson Novaes	*
Red Sonja: Solstice Special (2026)		Torunn Grønbekk	Edson Novaes	*
Vampirella vs. Red Sonja: Red City (2026)		Chuck Brown	Paulo H. Mel	*

==== Crossovers ====
Title	Issue	Writer	Artist	Collected edition
Crossovers
Witchblade/Red Sonja (2012)	1–5	Doug Wagner	Cezar Razek	Witchblade/Red Sonja
Conan/Red Sonja (2014)	1–4	Gail Simone, Jim Zub	Dan Panosian	Conan/Red Sonja
Red Sonja/Conan (2015)	1–4	Victor Gischler	Roberto Castro	Red Sonja/Conan
Swords of Sorrow: Red Sonja/Jungle Girl (2015)	1–3	Marguerite Bennett	Mirka Andolfo	Swords of Sorrow: Red Sonja/Jungle Girl
Pathfinder: Worldscape (2016)	1–6	Erik Mona	Jonathan Lau	Pathfinder: Worldscape Volume 1
Pathfinder: Worldscape: Red Sonja (2017)		Erik Mona	Tom Mandrake, Matt Gaudio	Pathfinder: Worldscape Volume 2
Red Sonja/Tarzan (2018)	1–6	Gail Simone	Walter Geovani	Red Sonja/Tarzan
Red Sonja and Vampirella meet Betty and Veronica (2019)	1–12	Amy Chu	Maria Sanapo	Red Sonja and Vampirella Meet Betty and Veronica Vol. 1 Red Sonja and Vampirella Meet Betty and Veronica Vol. 2
Vampirella/Red Sonja (2019)	1–12	Jordie Bellaire	Drew Moss	Vampirella/Red Sonja Vol.1: These Dark Synchronicities Vampirella/Red Sonja Vol.2
Red Sonja: Age of Chaos (2020)	1–6	Erik Burnham	Jonathan Lau	Red Sonja: Age of Chaos
Mars Attacks: Red Sonja (2020)	1–5	John Layman	Fran Strukan	Mars Attacks: Red Sonja
Red Sonja: The Super Powers (2021)	1–5	Dan Abnett	Jonathan Lau	Red Sonja: The Super Powers
Vampirella vs. Red Sonja (2022)	1–5	Dan Abnett	Alessandro Ranaldi	Vampirella vs. Red Sonja
Red Sonja Attacks Mars (2025)	1–4	Jay Stephens	Fran Strukan	*
Red Sonja vs. The Army of Darkness (2025)	1–5	Tim Seeley	Jim Terry	*
Red Sonja / Barbarella (2026)	1–5	Homero Rios	Diego Yapur	*

=== Spin-off bibliography ===
Publication	Publisher	Writer	Artist	Collected edition *=not collected
Hell Sonja (2022) 1–5	Dynamite Entertainment	Christopher Hastings	Pasquale Qualano	*
Red Sonja / Hell Sonja (2022) 1–4	Dynamite Entertainment	Jordan Clark	Miriana Puglia	*
Samurai Sonja (2022) 1–5	Dynamite Entertainment	Jordan Clark	Pasquale Qualano	*
Red Sitha (2022) 1–4	Dynamite Entertainment	Mirka Andolfo	Valentina Pinti	*

=== In solo stories in anthologies ===
- Conan the Barbarian, (Marvel Comics) (1970–1993).
  - Issue 48, "Episode!", Roy Thomas (w), John Buscema (p), Dick Giordano (i). (First solo story in color).
  - Issue 78, "Curse of the Undead-Man", Roy Thomas (w), John Buscema (a), Pablo Marcos (i). (Reprint from Savage Sword of Conan Issue 1).
- Savage Sword of Conan, (Marvel Comics) (1974–1995).
  - Issue 1, "Red Sonja" Roy Thomas (w), Esteban Maroto (p), Ernie Chan/Neal Adams (i). (First solo story in black and white. Also featured in the cover painted by Boris Vallejo).
  - Issue 1, "Curse of the Undead-Man", Roy Thomas (w), John Buscema (a), Pablo Marcos (i).
  - Issue 23, "Wizards of the Black Sun", Roy Thomas/Clair Noto (w), Frank Thorne (a). (Featured in the cover painted by Earl Norem)
  - Issue 29, "The Wizard and Red Sonja Show", Frank Thorne (w/a).
  - Issue 45, "Master of Shadows", Christy Marx (w), John Buscema (p), Tony DeZuniga (i).
  - Issue 78, "The Day of the Sword", Roy Thomas/Doug Moench (w), Howard Chaykin (layouts) Dick Giordano/Terry Austin (a). (Origin re-drawn). (Reprint from Kull and the Barbarians Issue 3)
  - Issue 83, "Red Sonja", Roy Thomas (w), Esteban Maroto (p), Ernie Chan/Neal Adams (i). (Reprint from Savage Sword of Conan Issue 1).
  - Issue 157, "Infant Terrible", Bruce Jones (w/a).
  - Issue 169, "The Endless Stair", Peter B. Gillis (w), Steven Carr (p), Armando Gil (i).
  - Issue 172, "The Waif and the Warrior", Jim Valentino (w), Steven Carr (p), Josef Rubinstein (i).
  - Issue 178, "Chains", Sue Flaxman (w), Gavin Curtis (p), Keith Williams (i).
  - Issue 187, "Red Sonja Quells the Song of the Siren", Marie Javins/Steve Buccellato (w), Alfredo Alcala (a).
  - Issue 192, "On the Road of Kings", Roy Thomas/Dann Thomas (w), Tony DeZuniga (a).
  - Issue 194, "The Road to Zamboula", Roy Thomas (w), Tony DeZuniga (a).
  - Issue 195, "Swordless in Zamboula", Roy Thomas (w), Tony DeZuniga (a).
  - Issues 207–10, "The Road to Zanadu", Roy Thomas/Dann Thomas (w), Del Barras/Reggie Jones/Kirk Etienne (a).
  - Issue 229, "A Lady for the Burning", Roy Thomas (w), Howard Simpson (p), Robert Quijano (i).
  - Issue 230–3, "The Ring of Ikribu" Roy Thomas (w), Esteban Maroto (a).
- Kull and the Barbarians (Marvel Comics) (1975).
  - Issue 2, "She-Devil with a Sword" Roy Thomas (w), Howard Chaykin (a).
  - Issue 3, "The Day of the Sword" Roy Thomas/Doug Moench (w), Howard Chaykin (a). (Origin story, first appearance of the Red Goddess. Also featured in the cover painted by Michael Whelan)
- A Marvel Super Special (Marvel Comics) (1978).
  - Issue 9, "Day of the Red Judgement", Roy Thomas/ Christy Marx (w), Howard Chaykin (a). (Second appearance of the Red Goddess from origin story. Also featured in the cover painted by John Buscema)

=== Team-ups ===
- With Spider-Man in Marvel Team-Up #79 (Marvel Comics) writer: Chris Claremont; artist: John Byrne
- With Spider-Man in Spider-Man/Red Sonja mini-series co-published by Dynamite Entertainment. The Spider-Man/Red Sonja TPB (ISBN 978-0-78-512744-4) collects Spider-Man/Red Sonja (2007) #1–5 (Oct. 2007 – Feb. 2008) and Marvel Team-Up (1972–1985 first series) #79 (March 1979).
- Wolverine in What if? Vol. 2, #16 (Marvel Comics) (Sonja is defeated by Wolverine and becomes his mate).
- Official Handbook of the Conan Universe #1 (Marvel Comics) (1986).
- Marvel Feature #4 was reprinted in the book The Superhero Women edited by Stan Lee. Red Sonja was featured among many of Marvel's female characters on the cover painted by John Romita, Sr.

==== Team-ups with Conan ====
- Conan the Barbarian, (Marvel Comics) (1970–1993).
  - Issue 23, "The Shadow of the Vulture", Roy Thomas (w), Barry Windsor-Smith (a), John Buscema/Akins/Stone (i). (First appearance in a Conan comic publication).
  - Issue 24, "Song of Red Sonja", Roy Thomas (w), Barry Windsor-Smith (a).
  - Issue 43, "Tower of Blood", Roy Thomas (w), John Buscema/Ernie Chua (i).
  - Issue 44, "The Fiend and the Flame", Roy Thomas (w), John Buscema/The Crusty Bunkers (a).
  - Issue 67, "Talons of the Man-Tiger", Roy Thomas (w), John Buscema (i).
  - Issue 68, "Of Once and Future Kings", Roy Thomas (w), John Buscema (i).
  - Issue 115, "A War of Wizards", Roy Thomas (w), John Buscema/Ernie Chan (i).
  - Issue 195, "Blood of Ages", James Owsley/Val Semeiks (w), Geof Isherwood (f).
  - Issue 196, "The Beast", James Owsley/Val Semeiks (w), Geof Isherwood (f).
  - Issue 197, "Stand", James Owsley/Val Semeiks (w), Geof Isherwood (f).
  - Issue 198, "The River", James Owsley/Val Semeiks (w), Geof Isherwood (f).
  - Issue 199, "Revelation in the Mists", James Owsley/Val Semeiks (w), Geof Isherwood (f).
  - Issue 200, "The Fall of Acheron", James Owsley/Val Semeiks (w), Geof Isherwood(f).
  - Issue 204, "Goblin", James Owsley/Val Semeiks (w), Vince Colletta (f).
  - Issue 205, "Necropolis", James Owsley/Val Semeiks (w), Alfredo Alcala (f).
  - Issue 241–3, "The Sorcerer and the She-Devil", Roy Thomas (w), Mike DeCarlo (i).
  - Issue 244, "Fiends of the Flaming Mountain", Roy Thomas (w), Mike DeCarlo (i).
  - Issue 245, "Empire of the Undead", Roy Thomas (w), Mike DeCarlo (i).
  - Issue 246, "Chaos in Khoraja", Roy Thomas (w), Mike DeCarlo (i).
  - Issue 247, "The Sword that Conquers All", Roy Thomas (w), Mike DeCarlo (i).
  - Issue 248, "The Peril and the Prophecy", Roy Thomas (w), Talaoc/Ernie Chan (i).
  - Issue 249, "Red Wind", Roy Thomas (w), Ernie Chan (i).
  - Issue 250, "Chaos Beneath Kuthchemes", Roy Thomas (w), Ernie Chan (i).
- Conan the Barbarian Annual (Marvel Comics) (1987).
  - Issue 12, "Legion of the Dead", James Owsley/Val Semeiks (w), Ernie Chan (a).
- Savage Sword of Conan, (Marvel Comics) (1974–1995).
  - Issue 82, "Song of Red Sonja", Roy Thomas (w), Barry Windsor-Smith (a). (Reprint from Conan the Barbarian Issue 24).
  - Issue 144, "The Waiting Doom", Charles Dixon (w), Ernie Chan (i).
  - Issue 145, "Feast of the Stag", Charles Dixon (w), Geof Isherwood (f).
  - Issue 153, "Phantasm", James Owsley (w), Luke McDonnell (p) Armando Gil (i).
  - Issue 170, "Emerald Lust", Charles Dixon (w), Gary Kwapisz (i).
  - Issue 179, "Fury of the Iron Damsels", Charles Dixon (w), Gary Kwapisz (i).
  - Issue 223, "The Many Mirrors of Tuzun Thune", Roy Thomas (W), Mike Docherty (p) (Sequel to Ravagers Out of Time graphic novel)
  - Issue 224, "Dragons of a World's Dawn", Roy Thomas (w), E.R. Cruz (i).
  - Issue 226, "Of Kings and Cataclysms", Roy Thomas (w), E.R. Cruz (i); "Days of the World Ending", Roy Thomas (w), E.R. Cruz (i); "Back from the Time Abyss", Roy Thomas (w), E.R. Cruz (i).
  - Issue 230, "Shall Python Fall?", Roy Thomas (w), E.R. Cruz (i).
  - Issue 231, "A Remembrance of Fires Past", Roy Thomas (w), E.R. Cruz (i).
  - Issue 232, "Reflections of Evil", Roy Thomas (w), E.R. Cruz (i).
  - Issue 233, "Here Be Monsters", Roy Thomas (w), Geof Isherwood (i).
- Marvel Graphic Novels (1992).
- Conan – The Ravagers Out of Time, Roy Thomas (w), Alfredo Alcala (i).
- Conan the King (Marvel Comics) (1985).
  - Issue 28, "Call of the Wild."
- Conan the Savage (Marvel Comics) (1996).
  - Issue 9, "City Under Siege", Chuck Dixon (w).
- Sonja and Conan team-up in the crossover Conan/Red Sonja and again in Red Sonja/Conan.

== In other media ==
=== Novels ===
Sonja has been featured in several novels by David C. Smith and Richard L. Tierney with covers by Boris Vallejo:

- #1 The Ring of Ikribu (Ace 1981) (Adapted to comics by Roy Thomas and Esteban Maroto in The Savage Sword of Conan issues 230–3). Smith has written an unproduced screenplay based on this novel.
- #2 Demon Night (Ace 1982)
- #3 When Hell Laughs (Ace 1982)
- #4 Endithor's Daughter (Ace 1982)
- #5 Against the Prince of Hell (Ace 1983)
- #6 Star of Doom (Ace 1983)

In April 2023, Red Sonja, LLC, announced that an original Red Sonja novel written by Gail Simone would be published by Orbit Books in mid-2024 titled Red Sonja: Consumed.

=== Television ===
Red Sonja appears in a self-titled episode of Conan the Adventurer in 1998, portrayed by Angelica Bridges. Additionally, pro wrestler Sable had announced plans to portray the character in a solo series which was never produced.

=== Animation ===
Red Sonja appears in the 2016 animated comic book adaptation Red Sonja: Queen of Plagues, voiced by Misty Lee.

=== Film ===
- Red Sonja appears in a self-titled film in 1985, portrayed by Brigitte Nielsen.
- Rose McGowan was intended to portray Sonja in a 2010 film, but these plans were abandoned after McGowan suffered injuries that permanently damaged her right arm. In a February 2011 interview, film producer Avi Lerner stated that Simon West was hired to direct the film and also mentioned Amber Heard as McGowan's replacement. On February 26, 2015, Christopher Cosmos was hired to write the film's script. Filmmaker Mike Lè Han has made a video for his pitch of him directing Red Sonja.
- A Red Sonja film was released in the US and UK in late 2025, directed by M.J. Bassett.

=== Role-playing games ===
Red Sonja is featured in the Dungeons & Dragons module Red Sonja Unconquered.

In 2018, Dynamite Entertainment released the Red Sonja: Hyrkania's Legacy board game, followed by an expansion module in 2020. The games allowed players to play as Red Sonja and various supporting characters in adventures set in Hyrkania.

== Awards ==
1973 Academy of Comic Book Arts Awards: Best Individual Story (Dramatic). The Song of Red Sonja. Written by Roy Thomas and pencilled, inked and colored by Barry Smith. The story first appeared in Conan the Barbarian issue 24 (March 1972), in which two panels were censored by John Romita, Sr. The uncensored story was reprinted in Marvel Treasury Edition, Volume 1, No. 15, 1977, where it was recolored by Glynis Wein and the artwork was slightly cropped to fit the page format.

== Legal issues ==
On June 6, 2006, the comic news site Newsarama reported that Red Sonja, LLC (which holds rights to the Roy Thomas version of the character, created in 1973) filed a lawsuit on four counts against Paradox Entertainment (which claims rights to Red Sonya as part of the Howard library) in US Federal Court in April 2006. The four counts were claims of copyright infringement, trademark infringement, trademark dilution, and unfair competition. The lawsuit was settled in January 2008, on the second day of the hearing, for a sum of $1 each. Red Sonja LLC paid $1 to Paradox for the rights to Howard's Red Sonya and permission for the Red Sonja stories to continue being set in Conan's Hyborian Age. Paradox simultaneously paid $1 to Red Sonja LLC for the exclusive print-publication rights for "The Shadow of the Vulture" now that one of the characters belongs to Red Sonja LLC.
