= The Circle (DC Comics) =

2008 comic book story arc

- Cover of Wonder Woman: The Circle (2008), hardcover collected edition, art by Terry Dodson.
- Publisher: DC Comics
- Publication date: January – April 2008
- Genre: Superhero; Mythology
- Title(s): Wonder Woman vol. 3, #14-17
- Main character(s): Wonder Woman, Nemesis, Captain Nazi, Queen Hippolyta

Creative team
- Writer: Gail Simone
- Artist(s): Ron Randall (issues #16 & 17)
- Penciller: Terry Dodson
- Inker: Rachel Dodson
- Letterer(s): Travis Lanham; John Hill; Rob Leigh
- Colorist(s): Lee Loughridge; Alex Sinclair; Pete Pantazis (issue 17)
- Editor(s): Nachie Castro; Matt Idelson
- The Circle: ISBN 1-4012-1932-2

"The Circle" is a four-issue comic book story arc written by Gail Simone with art by Terry Dodson and Rachel Dodson. Published in issues #14-17 of Wonder Woman (Vol. 3), it marked the first arc by Gail Simone on her run of the book.

== Publication history ==
Gail Simone, after much success with female characters such as from her run on Birds of Prey, was felt by fans to be the perfect writer for Wonder Woman as she would know how to handle such an iconic female role model. Diana had appeared in an issue of Birds of Prey during Simone's run, and in a two-issue story of The All-New Atom also by Simone. Simone had gone on record, expressing her admiration and affection for the character, and many readers felt she was needed for the book due to the relaunch having many problems that was costing the book readers (mostly from Amazons Attack!).

Following her debut issue, and the issues that followed on this arc, the story arc beginning Simone's arc was a resounding success. Many fans consider Simone's run to be a new "golden era" for Wonder Woman, not experienced since just a few years ago when Greg Rucka's run ended.

Simone's next major storyline on Wonder Woman would be "Ends of the Earth".

== Plot ==
=== Prologue (Past) ===
In a prologue backstory, told before the main story in each issue; some time before Wonder Woman's birth, Queen Hippolyta knights four Amazons as her personal guards: Myrto, Charis, Philomela, and Alkyone. One night, they all agree to guard their queen with their lives, but later on, they learn that Hippolyta had pleaded to the Gods for a child. Alkyone, the bald amazon, believes having a child would destroy them, and when they hear that one of their Amazon sisters has made a convincing baby doll, pretending it was real, she orders her dead.

Alkyone pleads with Hippolyta not to bring a child to their home, calling it evil. But Hippolyta leaves, saying that this event will be their salvation. Alkyone crushes the small baby doll and leads the other three to the city. At the same time, Hippolyta makes a baby girl out of clay. When it comes to life, she shows the baby to the rest of the Amazons, claiming she is their daughter, and names her Diana. Elsewhere, the four women watch from a distance, waiting.

Nightfall; the Circle head to where Hippolyta sleeps with her baby. Wounding Philippus the Captain of the Guard, they enter Hippolyta's chambers but the three women, except for Alkyone, start to admire the baby. When an eagle screams outside, Hippolyta is woken up and fights her traitor sisters as baby Diana watches. The fight is short as the other Amazons, with the wounded Philippus, surround the Circle.

=== Present ===
On Themyscira, Hippolyta is the only Amazon (as depicted in Amazons Attack!), but she isn't alone, for the four Amazon women are still imprisoned on the island. The same night every year, she asks all four of them in their prisons if they wish to repent, but all of them say no. But the last one, Alkyone, gives Hippolyta a crown and says that it is Hippolyta herself who had betrayed them by giving birth to the dragon (referring to Wonder Woman). Hippolyta says no and walks away when the woman tells her she must kill her daughter, or reveal the truth to her. Elsewhere, Wonder Woman is attacked by gorillas loyal to Gorilla Grodd. She does subdue them to talk to their leader named Tolifhar, who reveals they want to attack humans for what they do to their kind. She promises, under the word as an Amazon, that she will help it. Convinced, the gorillas and Diana are now allies, and she has them stay as houseguests to her apartment. Picking her up, Nemesis takes her (as Agent Diana Prince) to Department of Metahuman Affairs, where after they celebrate her birthday, Sarge Steel recruits her and Nemesis for a cooperative strike. Later, Sarge meets a Lieutenant Colonel Etta Candy, to whom he reveals his belief of Diana Prince being somehow connected to Wonder Woman; Etta agrees to help. During the mission, Diana and Nemesis arrive at their target: a site reported to house members of the Secret Society of Super Villains. Inside, they are attacked by Captain Nazi, who reveals he and many of his followers want a nation of their own. At the same time, those followers reach and plan to take over Themyscira.

Diana struggles against Captain Nazi. Because she has no powers in her secret identity, she uses other tactics and blind grenades to give her time to transform. Now as Wonder Woman, she wraps her lasso around Nazi to learn what is going on, and in process his sorrowful life to which she gives empathy. On Themyscira, as the Nazis land and prepare to take over the island, Hippolyta sees them, trims her hair, dons in her armor and fights them, all in hopes as forgiveness toward Athena. In various places, Wonder Woman asks for help to get to Themyscira: among them are Wōdanaz, Raijin, and Bast, who all decline to help. But it's Kāne Milohai who agrees to help, and back on Themyscira, Alkyone tells the Nazis that if they free her and the other three Amazons, they'll help them find and kill Hippolyta.

The Nazis destroy all pieces of statues, poetry, and art in favor of their new fatherland. The squad leader prepares to kill the four Amazon women, released from their prisons, until news about Hippolyta stops him. The survivor of the attack repeats what Hippolyta said to him "My daughter will come for me". Just then, the Squad Leader orders all that they have on the shores, just as Diana arrives. She orders all of them to surrender, but when they decline, she (saying to herself, the words of her faith), with help from the Gorillas, attack them all. Learning that she left due to a flu bug, Etta Candy heads to take a closer look from Diana Prince's apartment. Only to be confronted by another intruder. The tactics change as Diana goes to find her mother, just as a soldier informs the Squad Leader that they found Hippolyta's body. Diana hears the news and threatens one of the soldiers over where her mother is, as the four women attack the Nazis surrounding them. Diana finds her mother; she is hurt badly.

Two Nazi soldiers, along with others behind them, patrol when they hear something and come face to face with Diana, and Hippolyta behind her. Claiming that caution will not help them, Diana fights them all. When she gets to the last one, he screams to her that he surrenders and she stops, telling him to round up the others and tell them to drop their weapons. Moments later, Diana makes all the Nazis get back into their boats to leave the island and give them the coordinates to where they will be arrested. After the Nazis leave, hiding and armed with their bow and arrows, the Circle attacks Diana with god-made arrows. Seeing that it's an Amazon like her; Alkyone tells Diana that the Circle has Hippolyta, preparing for her funeral as she is dying. She tells her to go to the southern bridge, walking the statuary path, to get to her, and not alert the gorillas or cheat her way there, or the ceremony begins early. Diana tries to get there, but members of the Circle hit her with the arrows to stop her, knocking her unconscious. Waking up some time later, she realizes the Circle is using the old way of combat, so she takes her blood, uses it as war paint to make a "W" on her face, and heads out again. Moment now before the funeral begins; Diana uses the same old ways the Circle is using against them. Soon, Diana makes it to the Funeral pyre, and shows Alkyone the weapons the Circle were carrying, symbolizing that the other three women were defeated. Raising her sword, Alkyone prepares to strike, but Diana subdues her. Hippolyta tells her that because the Circle was imprisoned, they did not know that the Amazons became Diana's mothers, and Diana herself gave all of them hope and saved them. Alkyone refuses to believe her, but pleas with Diana to kill her. Diana refuses and forgives her for what she had done, but then Alkyone says that Diana could have been hers, revealing that she herself had the desire for a child like everyone else, but wanted to ignore it. Alkyone runs off and falls into the ocean, to her death. As she leaves, the rest of the Circle have returned to their prisons, and the gorillas tell Diana that they will watch over Hippolyta.

In an epilogue, the Justice League holds Diana's birthday. Etta Candy is there too, revealing that she knew Diana was Diana Prince. Talking outside, Diana talks about Alkyone, how she died for no reason. Etta cheers her up, saying that if she searches, she'll find. Before going back inside, Etta comments on the moon, and Diana says "it's a perfect circle".

== Reception ==
The four issues that make up "The Circle" were highly praised, which in turn garnered attention and praise for Gail Simone's future issues. IGN had bolded on its article that "the series finally gets going, and that it was the best Wonder Woman since Greg Rucka's name was still in the credits". They also came up with the idea that Gail Simone and artists Terry Dodson and his wife Rachel Dodson were DC's versions of Brian Michael Bendis and Frank Cho from Marvel Comics. Readers praised the retcon in Diana's origin, as well as the characters that made up The Circle, wondering why no other writer came up with it before. The Circle was also seen as a breather to Diana's rogues gallery, which needed fresh new additions.

The greatest acclaim, however, came from how Gail Simone handled and wrote Diana, in comparison to previous writers. Dan Philips of IGN wrote: "Far too many writers have wavered randomly between depicting Wonder Woman as a bloodthirsty warrior one minute, a peaceful and compassionate Ambassador the next, and an antiquated and naïve Goddess the next. Simone seems to have struck the perfect balance between the first two and finally put the third to bed, and most importantly, she's molded Diana into a very relatable and sympathetic character. And as any Wonder Woman fan knows all too well at this point, that's exactly what the character's been in dire need of for so long".

== Collected editions ==
The storyline has been collected into a single volume:

- The Circle (collects Wonder Woman #14-19, 144 pages, hardcover, November 2008, ISBN 1-4012-1932-2)

== See also ==
- List of Wonder Woman enemies
