= The Shadow of the Vulture =

Short story by Robert E. Howard

- Short story by Robert E. Howard
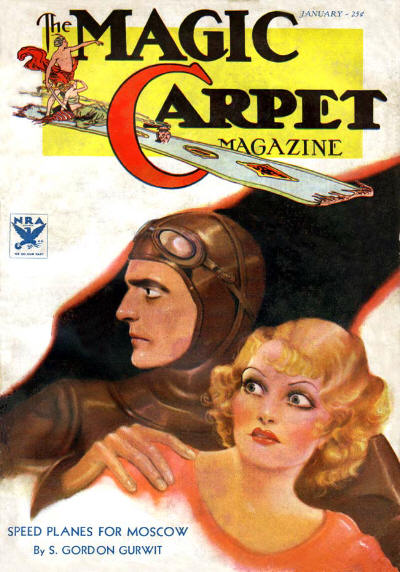
- Country: United States
- Language: English
- Genre: Historical fiction

Publication
- Published in: The Magic Carpet Magazine
- Media type: Pulp magazine
- Publication date: January 1934

"The Shadow of the Vulture" is a short story by American writer Robert E. Howard, first published in The Magic Carpet Magazine, January 1934. The story introduces the character of Red Sonya of Rogatino, who later became the inspiration for the Marvel Comics character Red Sonja, archetype of the chainmail-bikini clad female warrior.

Unlike Howard's better-known fantasy work, "The Shadow of the Vulture" is historical fiction, set in the 16th century. It uses the career of Ottoman sultan Suleiman the Magnificent (also known as Sultan Suleiman I), the aftermath of the Battle of Mohács (1526) and the later Siege of Vienna of 1529 as a backdrop for imaginary characters and events.

== Plot ==
In Istanbul, the Ottoman sultan Suleiman the Magnificent sends home members of a Holy Roman diplomatic envoy whom he has kept imprisoned for nine months. He recognizes one of the members, however; a knight by the name of Gottfried Von Kalmbach, who had seriously wounded him during the Battle of Mohács. The Ottoman Grand Vizier Pargalı Ibrahim Pasha entrusts the widely feared soldier, Mikhal Oglu, with hunting down Von Kalmbach and retrieving his head.

Mikhal Oglu and his warriors raid the countryside between the Ottoman Empire and Vienna in preparation for Suleiman's attack on the city. They attack a small Danubian village, in which Von Kalmbach had been sleeping off the previous night's drinking. He fights his way free, and rides for Vienna, where the townspeople are preparing for the arrival of Suleiman.

The full Ottoman army arrives, and the siege begins. Von Kalmbach fights the encroaching Turkish soldiers atop the walls. He meets a belligerent, red-haired woman who fights alongside the men – 'Red' Sonya of Rogatino, revealed to be the sister of Suleiman's favourite harem girl, Roxelana. When one fight against a number of Turks proves to be overwhelming, she comes to Von Kalmbach's aid.

Later, there is a lull in the siege and the defenders content themselves with drinking wine in the city square. Red Sonya insults Von Kalmbach, and an argument breaks out. Drunk and furious, Von Kalmbach spurs the men into an impromptu attack on the Ottoman encampment outside the city. Coincidentally, the drunken raid thwarts a surprise attack planned by the sultan, to have been assisted by traitors within the walls of Vienna.

The sultan eventually concedes defeat, and the Ottoman army prepares to leave. Von Kalmbach, however, is drugged and kidnapped by the traitors in Vienna – an Armenian merchant and his son, who had been in communication with the Sultan's vizier and hoped to claim the knight's head. Red Sonya comes to Von Kalmbach's aid yet again. She blackmails the Armenian into delivering a message to Mikhal Oglu, who was serving as vanguard for the capitulating Ottoman army. Oglu receives the message and, believing Von Kalmbach to be alone and not too far away from his position, leaves the column with a small contingent. He is met, however, by an Austrian ambush.

In Istanbul, Suleiman is holding celebrations in honour of his 'victory' in central Europe. Among the many gifts is a package that Ibrahim opens, thinking it to be the head of Von Kalmbach. It is in fact the head of Mikhal Oglu, and included is a belittling note from Red Sonya and Von Kalmbach.

== Setting ==
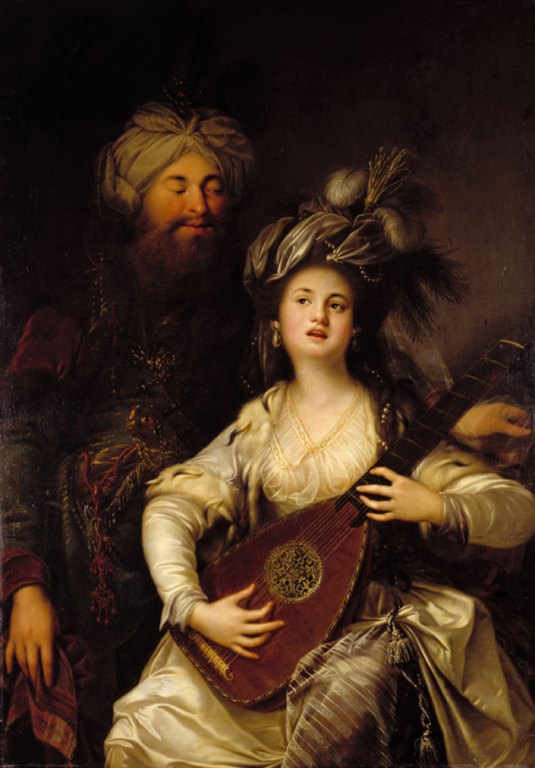
Roxelana and the Sultan Suleiman the Magnificent, the villains of the story. Painting by the German baroque painter Anton Hickel (1780)

The story is set around the Battle of Mohács and the later Siege of Vienna (1529), with Suleiman the Magnificent's attack into Europe.

== Red Sonya of Rogatino ==
In the story, Red Sonya of Rogatino is a warrior woman of Polish-Ukrainian origin with a grudge against the Ottoman sultan. She has the eponymous red hair and a fiery temper to match. It is revealed in the narrative that she is sister to the favourite of Suleiman himself, the Ruthenian harem girl Roxelana, who Suleiman would marry and make his sole legal wife.

Howard's Red Sonya has no connection to his Conan the Barbarian character. Roy Thomas and Barry Smith, in Marvel Comics' Conan the Barbarian title, created a new character from the Hyborian Age inspired by Red Sonya named Red Sonja, whose descendant Mary Jane Watson has on occasion taken on her form. "The Shadow of the Vulture" itself was adapted by Marvel as a Conan and Red Sonja story with the same title in Conan the Barbarian #23 (February 1973).

Additionally, the 1985 film Red Sonja, which took place in the Hyborian Age, states in the opening credits, "Based on the character created by Robert E. Howard", making this film another link between Red Sonja and the Hyborian Age.
