= List of Wonder Woman episodes =

This is a list of episodes for the 1970s American television series Wonder Woman featuring Lynda Carter.

== Series overview ==
All three seasons and the TV film pilot have been released on DVD by Warner Home Video, including a complete series DVD set titled Wonder Woman: The Complete Collection on November 6, 2007.

| Season | Episodes | Originally released | | |
| Season | Episodes | First released | Last released | Network |
|---|---|---|---|---|
| Television film pilot | | November 7, 1975 | | ABC |
| 1 | 13 | April 21, 1976 | February 16, 1977 | ABC |
| 2 | 22 | September 16, 1977 | April 21, 1978 | CBS |
| 3 | 24 | September 22, 1978 | September 11, 1979 | CBS |

== Episodes ==
=== TV film pilot (1975) ===
| Title | Directed by | Written by | Original release date |
|---|---|---|---|
| The New Original Wonder Woman | Leonard Horn | Stanley Ralph Ross | November 7, 1975 |
Princess Diana volunteers to return Steve Trevor to Washington, D.C., after he crashes his airplane on Paradise Island During World War II, placing him in a coma. Upon arriving in Washington, D.C., she establishes the secret identity of Diana Prince and begins working for Trevor. Cast: John Randolph as General Phil Blankenship, Red Buttons as Ashley Norman, Stella Stevens as Marcia, Eric Braeden as Captain Drangel, Severn Darden as Bad Guy, Fannie Flagg as Amazon Doctor, Henry Gibson as Nikolas, Kenneth Mars as Colonel Von Blasko, Cloris Leachman as Queen Hippolyta, Ian Wolfe as Bank Manager, and Anne Ramsey as Taxi Cab Driver. Notes: This 90-minute made-for-television movie together with the first two hour-long episodes constituted a "mini-season", but are generally referenced as part of Season 1.

=== Season 1 (1976–77) ===
| No. overall | No. in season | Title | Directed by | Written by | Original release date |
|---|---|---|---|---|---|
| 1 | 1 | "Wonder Woman Meets Baroness von Gunther" | Barry Crane | Margaret Armen | April 21, 1976 |
The Baroness Paula von Gunther, an imprisoned Nazi spy, and her crew are framing Steve Trevor, the war hero, for several incidents of sabotage to make him appear as a traitor, in an attempt to lower the Allies' morale. Trevor suspects the Baroness may be behind his framing. The prison warden's son Tommy, an avid fan of detective fiction, assists Wonder Woman. Having discovered the Baroness' hideout, Wonder Woman is surprised by the Baroness. She sprays Wonder Woman in the face with knock-out gas and Wonder Woman faints. Later, Wonder Woman recovers and after she and Steve Trevor have a fight against the Baroness and her crew, the Baroness is brought to justice. Guest stars: Christine Belford as Baroness Paula Von Gunther, Edmund Gilbert as Warden, Christian Juttner as Tommy, Bradford Dillman as Arthur Deal III, and John Brandon as Police Sergeant. Notes: This episode is based on the comic book story, "Wonder Woman Versus the Prison Spy Ring" originally published sans title in Wonder Woman #1, cover date Summer 1942. Written by William Moulton Marston and illustrated by H. G. Peter, the story was given a title in "Wonder Woman Archives Volume 1" published in 1998.
| 2 | 2 | "Fausta, the Nazi Wonder Woman" | Barry Crane | Bruce Shelley & David Ketchum | April 28, 1976 |
Fausta Grables lures Wonder Woman into a trap. Wonder Woman falls through a false floor where one of Fausta's gang overpowers her with chloroform causing Wonder Woman to faint. The unconscious Wonder Woman is then kidnapped and taken to Germany for study. Steve launches a mission to rescue her but is captured himself shortly after Wonder Woman orchestrates her own escape. Wonder Woman returns to Germany to rescue Steve and convince Fausta to abandon the Nazi cause. Guest stars: Lynda Day George as Fausta Grables, Bo Brundin as Colonel Kesselman, Jeff Cooper as Major Charlie Scott, Keene Curtis as Mueller, and Christopher George as Rojak. Notes: Fausta Grables first appeared in Comic Cavalcade #2 Spring 1943 issue in a story entitled "Wanted by Hitler, Dead or Alive". This episode marks the introduction of the red, white, and blue star-spangled cape — worn in this episode by Fausta disguised as Wonder Woman. The real Wonder Woman will adopt it throughout the series for formal occasions. Both Fausta (disguised as Wonder Woman) and the real Wonder Woman wear golden masks as they compete at the bond rally.
| 3 | 3 | "Beauty on Parade" | Richard Kinon | Ron Friedman | October 13, 1976 |
Diana enters a beauty contest to expose a sabotage ring of radar scanning equipment, which is led by the pageant's musical director Monty Burns. Guest stars: Anne Francis as Lola Flynn, Dick Van Patten as Jack Wood, William Lanteau as Colonel Flint, and Bobby Van as Monty Burns. Notes: This episode introduces the thunderclap / burst-of-light transformation as Diana Prince spins into Wonder Woman. The three previous entries employed a slow-motion dissolve transformation.
| 4 | 4 | "The Feminum Mystique" | Herb Wallerstein | S : Barbara Avedon & Barbara Corday; T : Jimmy Sangster | November 6, 1976 |
| 5 | 5 | "The Feminum Mystique" | Herb Wallerstein | S : Barbara Avedon & Barbara Corday; T : Jimmy Sangster | November 8, 1976 |
Part 1: The United States Army is about to unveil its first jet fighter the XPJ-1 and the Nazis are determined to steal the plane and study it to build a jet fighter of their own. Meanwhile, Diana's younger sister Drusilla arrives from Paradise Island for a visit and gets caught up in the Nazis' plot. Kriegsmarine Captain Radl also wants to find out the source of feminum, the metal used to make Wonder Woman's bracelets. He kidnaps General Blankenship, who is taking Drusilla for a drive in Washington. Drusilla discovers that she can spin into costume like her sister and turns into Wonder Girl. Wonder Girl tries to rescue the General but Captain Radl chloroforms her. Part 2: Peter Knight, an engineer secretly working for the Nazis, gains Drusilla's trust and tricks her into revealing the location of Paradise Island. The Kriegsmarine U-boat's crew stage an invasion and force the Amazons to mine feminum ore. Queen Hippolyta commissions Princess Diana (dressed in her Wonder Woman regalia, but addressed by her proper name and royal title) to command the Amazons' militia. Wonder Girl escapes and, as Drusilla, exposes Peter as a Nazi spy. Learning Diana has returned home, Wonder Girl also returns home to Paradise Island whereupon the two princesses engineer the capture of all of the invading Germans; the Amazons' memory-wiping technology deletes the sailors' knowledge of the island's existence before they are set adrift. Wonder Woman and Wonder Girl then return to America to prevent the theft of the XPJ-1 jet. Guest stars: John Saxon as Captain Radl, Carolyn Jones as Queen Hippolyta, Charles Frank as Peter Knight, Paul Shenar as Lieutenant Wertz, Kurt Kreuger as Major Hemmschler, and Debra Winger as Drusilla. Notes: This was one of Debra Winger's first acting roles. This was the only episode in the entire series that shows Wonder Woman changing back into Diana Prince, although the camera was on Drusilla's reaction rather than the transformation.
| 6 | 6 | "Wonder Woman vs. Gargantua!" | Charles R. Rondeau | David Ketchum & Tony DiMarco | December 18, 1976 |
Animal behavior specialist and Nazi agent Erica Belgard abducts a super-strong gorilla named Gargantua from his African jungle home in order to recapture a defecting Nazi agent Conrad Steigler who is in American custody. Erica decides to use the gorilla's strength to defeat and capture Wonder Woman. Guest stars: Robert Loggia as Hans Eichler, Gretchen Corbett as Erica Belgard, John Hillerman as Conrad Steigler, and Tom Reese as Carl. Notes: Wonder Woman's similarly-named adversary, Giganta, was originally a super-evolved gorilla, in Wonder Woman #9 (Summer 1944). The map of Africa used at the beginning of the episode showed the "Republic of the Congo", which was not established until 1960, 18 years after the events are supposed to have taken place; in 1942, the area shown was called the Belgian Congo, later renamed the Democratic Republic of the Congo.
| 7 | 7 | "The Pluto File" | Herb Wallerstein | Herbert Bermann | December 25, 1976 |
An infamous Irish terrorist known as "The Falcon" steals a formula designed to produce man-made earthquakes in order to level Washington, DC. Wonder Woman and the formula's inventor must work together to stop him. The Falcon is also carrying the bubonic plague and must be quarantined. Guest stars: Robert Reed as The Falcon, Hayden Rorke as Professor Otis Warren, and Kenneth Tigar as Dr. Barnes.
| 8 | 8 | "Last of the $2 Bills" | Stuart Margolin | Paul Dubov & Gwen Bagni | January 8, 1977 |
Diana and Steve investigate a Nazi plot to flood the American economy with counterfeit $2 bills in order to destabilize the American war effort. The Nazis hatch a long-range plot taking several months to implement, as plastic surgery and vocal training is used to transform two Nazi agents into the Bureau of Engraving and Printing, chief Hank Miller and his fiancée Maggie Robbins, a waitress and restaurant owner. Guest stars: James Olson as Wotan, Barbara Anderson as Maggie Robbins, John Howard as Dr. Diderich, and David Cryer as Hank Miller. Notes: Within the series' universe, production of the $2 ceased in 1942. Major Trevor handed YN1 Prince the last note to be archived; in the real world, production continued until halted in 1966-1976. Fans of Batman immediately recognized the prominently featured façade of the BEP (Building 61 on the Warner Brothers backlot's Embassy Courtyard), having not been re-dressed since its use as Gotham City Police headquarters.
| 9 | 9 | "Judgment from Outer Space" | Alan Crosland Jr. | Stephen Kandel | January 15, 1977 |
| 10 | 10 | "Judgment from Outer Space" | Alan Crosland Jr. | Stephen Kandel | January 17, 1977 |
Part 1: An alien named Andros arrives on Earth to study it and to convince the intergalactic council that the planet should not be destroyed because of World War II. The American government first suspects Andros of being a Nazi spy and the Nazis want to use Andros's powers for world domination. Wonder Woman and Andros must work together to prove America's intentions are peaceful as he at first is not sure if either side is right (mentioning the internment of "Americans of Japanese descent" in reply to Wonder Woman's charges against the Nazi racial policies). While Andros is exploring the Library of Congress he is stripped of his powers and captured by the Nazis, Wonder Woman tries to save him, but passes out after being hit by gas. The intergalactic council decrees that if Andros is killed the Earth will be destroyed. Part 2: Wonder Woman journeys to Germany to rescue Andros. After seeing that she is prepared to sacrifice her life to save him, and when Steve Trevor demonstrates that the Allied cause is just, the aliens relent on their threat to destroy the planet. Andros invites Wonder Woman to accompany him in space, but she replies that she is needed on Earth. Andros promises to return to see her in 50 years (in 1992). Guest stars: Tim O'Connor as Andros, Kurt Kaszner as S.S. General Von Dreiberg, Janet MacLachlan as Sakri, Scott Hylands as Paul Bjornsen, Archie Johnson as General Zachary Kane, Vic Perrin as Gorel, and Christopher Cary as Mallory. Note: Andros' son, also called Andros, is later revealed to have visited the following year, 1943, before returning in 1977.
| 11 | 11 | "Formula 407" | Herb Wallerstein | Elroy Schwartz | January 22, 1977 |
Diana and Steve head to Argentina to pick up a formula from scientist Professor Moreno. The formula can make rubber tires as strong as steel. The Nazis want to steal the formula to use it on their truck tires. Nazi agent Major Keller. who is secretly involved with the scientist's assistant Maria, directs his henchmen to kidnap both the scientist's daughter (to obtain the formula) and Steve (to take him back to Germany for interrogation). Diana, witnessing the abduction, spins into costume and tries to intervene, only to be chloroformed by the Nazis. She awakens tied up in a room with Steve. Wonder Woman and Steve break free to find the girl before the agent takes the formula back to Germany. Guest stars: Nehemiah Persoff as Professor Moreno, Marisa Pavan as Maria, Charles Macaulay as Ambassador McCauley, Armando Silvestre as Antonio Cruz, and Curt Lowens as S.S. General.
| 12 | 12 | "The Bushwhackers" | Stuart Margolin | Skip Webster | January 29, 1977 |
Wonder Woman journeys to Texas where Nazi agents are rustling cattle being raised for the American government. Cattle rancher J.P. Hadley and his several adopted war orphan kids try to assist Wonder Woman in her efforts to stop the Nazis. Wonder Woman's magic belt is stolen by the rustlers, who lock her in an abandoned jail cell, the war orphan kids retrieve her belt, then come to her rescue. Guest stars: Roy Rogers as J.P. Hadley, Henry Darrow as Walter Lampkin, Lance Kerwin as Jeff Hadley, and Christoff St. John as Linc. Notes: Wonder Woman adopts a modest new outfit for this episode only: a long-sleeved red shirt and white calf-length trousers, while retaining her boots, magic belt, golden lasso, tiara, and feminum bracelets. Hadley addresses BG Blankenship as "Phil", the same forename as his comic book counterpart, General Phil Darnell. The Flag of Texas is flown upside down at the ranch.
| 13 | 13 | "Wonder Woman in Hollywood" | Bruce Bilson | Jimmy Sangster | February 16, 1977 |
Wonder Woman and Wonder Girl work to stop a Nazi agent turned film producer, Mark Bremer, from taking Steve and several other soldiers back to Germany to put them in a propaganda film that will destroy America's image as a peace-loving country. Guest stars: Harris Yulin as Mark Bremer, Robert Hays as Cpl. Jim Ames, Christopher Norris as Gloria Beverly, Charles Cyphers as Kurt, Carolyn Jones as Queen Hippolyta, and Barry Van Dyke as Freddy. Final appearances of Debra Winger as Drusilla / Wonder Girl, Richard Eastham as General Phil Blankenship, and Beatrice Colen as Private Etta Candy.

=== Season 2 (1977–78) ===
| No. overall | No. in season | Title | Directed by | Written by | Original release date |
|---|---|---|---|---|---|
| 14 | 1 | "The Return of Wonder Woman" | Alan Crosland Jr. | Stephen Kandel | September 16, 1977 |
More than 30 years after her adventures during World War II, Princess Diana resumes the mantle of Wonder Woman when a plane carrying Steve Trevor Jr. (son of her former associate) lands on Paradise Island. Wonder Woman and Steve must prevent terrorist Dr. Solano from stealing a nuclear power plant and destabilizing all of Latin America. Guest stars: Fritz Weaver as Dr. Solano, Bettye Ackerman as Asclepia, Jessica Walter, as Gloria, and Beatrice Straight as Queen Hippolyta. First appearance of Norman Burton as Joe Atkinson, who had worked special operations during the Second World War. Notes: This episode was 90 minutes in its original form but is usually edited to 60 minutes for syndication. The series moved from ABC to CBS and is now set in the 1970s where Steve Jr. and Diana are government agents at the hi-tech Inter-Agency Defense Command (IADC).
| 15 | 2 | "Anschluss '77" | Alan Crosland Jr. | Dallas L. Barnes | September 23, 1977 |
Wonder Woman must stop Nazi war criminals in South America from establishing the Fourth Reich led by a clone of Adolf Hitler. Guest stars: Mel Ferrer as Fritz Gerlich, Barry Dennen as Hitler, and Kurt Kreuger as Koenig.
| 16 | 3 | "The Man Who Could Move the World" | Bob Kelljan | Judy Burns | September 30, 1977 |
A Japanese American man, Takeo Ishida, who had been in an internment camp during World War II blames Wonder Woman for the death of his brother. He has developed telekinetic powers and uses them to try to exact revenge on Wonder Woman. Guest stars: Yuki Shimoda as Takeo Ishida, Lew Ayres as Dr. Kenneth Wilson, James Hong as Oshima, J. Kenneth Campbell as Taft, and Peter Kwong as Masaaki Ishida, as a Boy. Notes: This is the only episode after the first season for which WWII-period scenes were filmed. In the WWII scenes, Wonder Woman is wearing her gold bracelets instead of her silver bracelets from season one.
| 17 | 4 | "The Bermuda Triangle Crisis" | Seymour Robbie | Calvin Clements, Jr. | October 7, 1977 |
Wonder Woman must decide between conflicting loyalties. If she does her duty as Diana Prince, she will put Paradise Island in danger of becoming a nuclear testing site. Guest stars: Charles Cioffi as Raymond Manta, and final series appearance of Queen Hyppolyta, portrayed by Beatrice Straight. Notes: Submarine footage of the USOS Seaview is from Voyage to the Bottom of the Sea. Wonder Woman displays the tiara's communications capability for the first time, communicating with Paradise Island via the star ruby and a mirror (similar to the mental radio of the comics); this capability was referred to by her mother, Queen Hippolyta, when re-issuing the costume to Princess Diana in the season première. She also spins up an alternate costume, a long blue wetsuit including a hood with a tiara design, for the first time in this episode. This is the first episode with no direct references to events of World War II except for Steve Trevor Sr.'s plane crash.
| 18 | 5 | "Knockout" | Seymour Robbie | Mark Rodgers | October 14, 1977 |
Steve gets abducted on his vacation to Los Angeles. After Diana frees him, they discover a vast terrorist plot against world leaders. Guest stars: Jayne Kennedy as Carolyn Hamilton, Burr DeBenning as Tom Baker, Arch Johnson as John Kelly, Frank Marth as Tall Man, Ted Shackelford as Pete Johnson, Abraham Alvarez as Radio Car Officer Fernandez, and K. C. Martel as Ted.
| 19 | 6 | "The Pied Piper" | Alan Crosland Jr. | T : Brian McKay; S/T : David Ketchum & Tony DiMarco | October 21, 1977 |
Rock star flutist Hamlin Rule hypnotizes his groupies into robbing the box offices of his concerts. When he hypnotizes Elena, the daughter of IADC's Joe Atkinson, Wonder Woman intervenes to free her. Guest stars: Martin Mull as Hamlin Rule, Denny Miller as Carl Schwartz, Eve Plumb as Elena, and Bob Hastings as Gatekeeper.
| 20 | 7 | "The Queen and the Thief" | Jack Arnold | Bruce Shelly | October 28, 1977 |
Diana goes undercover at the Malakan embassy to protect the crown jewels from a notorious international jewel thief Evan Robley. The loss of the jewels would spell the end of the reign of Queen Kathryn of Malakar. In a twist, the thief is not behind the theft of the jewels. Ambassador Orrick, consulate to the royal family, is actually behind the theft, intending to have the thief steal fakes in order to force the queen to abdicate. Guest stars: David Hedison as Evan Robley, Juliet Mills as Queen Kathryn, and John Colicos as Ambassador Orrick.
| 21 | 8 | "I Do, I Do" | Herb Wallerstein | Richard Carr | November 11, 1977 |
Diana goes undercover with agent Christian Harrison as a married couple at a spa to investigate leaks of classified information. She discovers that evil masseur David Allen is using his skills to hypnotize the wives of government officials into revealing secrets. Guest stars: Celeste Holm as Dolly Tucker, Simon Scott as Sam Tucker, John Getz as Christian Harrison, Henry Darrow as David Allen, Kent Smith as Chief Justice Brown, Thomas W. Babson as Smitty, and Steve Eastin as Johnny. Notes: This episode marks two major changes in the appearance of Wonder Woman's alter ego, Diana Prince: the first time she removes her glasses in public and the first time she lets down her hair — in a ponytail.
| 22 | 9 | "The Man Who Made Volcanoes" | Alan Crosland Jr. | S : Wilton Denmark; T : Brian McKay and Dan Ullman | November 18, 1977 |
Diana races against teams of Soviet and Chinese agents to stop Professor Arthur Chapman, an evil scientist who has the ability to cause volcanoes to erupt. Guest stars: Roger Davis as Jack Corbin, Irene Tsu as Mei Ling, Roddy McDowall as Professor Arthur Chapman, and Philip Ahn as Colonel Minh. Final appearance of Norman Burton as Joe Atkinson. Notes: With this re-launch episode, Bruce Lansbury becomes Supervising Producer; montage clips replace animated opening credits; Trevor is promoted to a desk job, and his role diminishes throughout the remainder of the series.
| 23 | 10 | "Mind Stealers from Outer Space" | Michael Caffey | Stephen Kandel | December 2, 1977 |
| 24 | 11 | "Mind Stealers from Outer Space" | Alan Crosland Jr. | Stephen Kandel | December 9, 1977 |
Part 1: An alien race called the Skrill come to Earth to steal the minds of humans to be sold into slavery. Andros, son of the alien visitor from the 1940s, arrives with orders to capture the Skrill. If he fails, his people will use insanity-inducement procedures upon the Earth to prevent their escape. The Skrill find out Diana Prince is also Wonder Woman. They attack Diana and weaken her until she faints. Andros then saves her. Part 2: Wonder Woman and Andros continue to battle the Skrill, who are even more dangerous now that they have deduced Wonder Woman's secret identity and have captured Andros' mind. IRAC also hints, implying its knowledge of Diana's secret identity. Guest stars: Dack Rambo as Andros, Vincent Van Patten as Johnny, Earl Boen as Chaka, Barry Cahill as General Miller, Barbara O. Jones as Sell, and Anne Ramsey as Connie.
| 25 | 12 | "The Deadly Toys" | Dick Moder | S : Carey Wilber; T : Anne Collins | December 30, 1977 |
An android double of Wonder Woman is built by toymaker Orlich Hoffman. When she investigates, Diana is injected by a toy butterfly and faints. Later she awakes, then transforms into Wonder Woman, but she is confronted by the android and is knocked unconscious. Meanwhile, IRAC all but admits its knowledge of Diana's secret identity to an oblivious Steve Trevor. Guest stars: Frank Gorshin as Orlich Hoffman and John Rubinstein as Major Dexter. Notes: Despite Princess Diana's pagan beliefs, but in accordance with Lynda Carter's Christian faith, Wonder Woman scrawls a public, "Merry Christmas -- W.W." in spray snow on a toy store window.
| 26 | 13 | "Light-fingered Lady" | Alan Crosland Jr. | Bruce Shelly | January 6, 1978 |
Diana Prince goes undercover as a burglar to infiltrate a burglary ring, and communicates with guard dogs to cover her escape. Guest stars: Chris Stone as Ryan, Bubba Smith as Rojak, Gary Crosby as Grease, Titos Vandis as Sutton, and Greg Morris as Caribe.
| 27 | 14 | "Screaming Javelin" | Michael Caffey | Brian McKay | January 20, 1978 |
Mariposa, ruler of a micronation, kidnaps top athletes and forces them to compete for his country at the Olympic Games. Wonder Woman uses her skill on the uneven bars to battle baddies. Meanwhile, IRAC hints to Diana that it is aware of her dual identity. Guest stars: Henry Gibson as Mariposa, Robert Sampson as Bo Taggart, Melanie Chartoff as Nadia, Rick Springfield as Tom, and E. J. Peaker as Lois.
| 28 | 15 | "Diana's Disappearing Act" | Michael Caffey | S.S. Schweitzer | February 3, 1978 |
Wonder Woman goes after alchemist-magician Cagliostro who has discovered a way to turn lead into gold. Guest stars: Dick Gautier as Cagliostro, Ed Begley, Jr. as Harold Farnum, J. A. Preston as Jazreel, Allen Williams as Hutchins, Aharon Ipalé as The Emir, and Brenda Benét as Morgana. Notes: The transformation sunburst and thunderclap are seen and heard without Diana / Wonder Woman herself, appearing outside of the crate in which she is trapped. Steve Trevor Jr. has a WWII-era picture of his identical father, Diana's former boss, on the window sill behind his desk.
| 29 | 16 | "Death in Disguise" | Alan Crosland Jr. | Tom Sawyer | February 10, 1978 |
Diana is assigned to protect industrialist Carlo Indrezzano from an assassination attempt. Guest stars: Joel Fabiani as Nightingale, Jennifer Darling as Violet Louise Tree, Lee Bergere as Marius, Charles Pierce as Starker / Finley, George Chakiris as Carlo Indrezzano, Art Batanides as Krug, Christopher Cary as Beamer, and Maurice Marsac as Maitre D'. Note: Wonder Woman displays superhuman hearing.
| 30 | 17 | "IRAC Is Missing" | Alexander Singer | Anne Collins | February 17, 1978 |
Wonder Woman takes on a man named Bernard Havitol who is looking to acquire the memories of the best computers in the world and is looking at IRAC for his next addition. IRAC witnesses Diana Prince transforming into Wonder Woman. Guest stars: Ross Martin as Bernard Havitol, Lee Paul as Dirk, and Tina Lenert as Cori. Note: First appearance of Rover.
| 31 | 18 | "Flight to Oblivion" | Alan Crosland Jr. | Patrick Mathews | March 3, 1978 |
Diana poses as an Air Force staff sergeant photographer to protect a test flight from sabotage by Dante, manager of the rock band The Hull City Howlers. Guest stars: Michael Shannon as Lt. Stonehouse, Corinne Michaels as Capt. Anne Colby, Alan Fudge as Major Cornell, Mitch Vogel as Mitch, and John van Dreelen as Dante. Note: Diana's rank is one grade lower than her assumed Naval rate of YN1 more than 30 years earlier. Among the ribbons that she wears on her disguise is the Air Force's version of Good Conduct Medal, the Naval version of which she earned during World War II.
| 32 | 19 | "Seance of Terror" | Dick Moder | Bruce Shelly | March 10, 1978 |
Matthew Koslo, a boy with astonishing psychic ability, is being exploited by his aunt Theodora and uncle Lawson who have been paid to trick world leaders into continuing a bloody war. Meanwhile, IRAC and Rover confirm to each other that they know Diana is Wonder Woman; when Diana's access is suspended, IRAC nevertheless provides her the information she requests, albeit with a wink and a nod, saying "I am not authorized to tell Diana Prince...", noting to Rover after her departure that no one pulled Wonder Woman's clearance. Guest stars: Rick Jason as Lawson Koslo, John Fujioka as Yamura, Hanna Hertelendy as Ms. Kell, and Tad Horino as Yamura, Sr..
| 33 | 20 | "The Man Who Wouldn't Tell" | Alan Crosland Jr. | Anne Collins | March 31, 1978 |
Alan, a janitor, accidentally mixes cleaning supplies creating a powerful explosive. Wonder Woman must protect him from evil-doers who are after the secret formula. Guest stars: Jane Actman as Meg, Philip M. Thomas as Furst, Michael Cole as Ted, Gary Burghoff as Alan, and Joseph Ruskin as Dr. Black (uncredited).
| 34 | 21 | "The Girl from Ilandia" | Dick Moder | Anne Collins | April 7, 1978 |
Newspaper magnate Simon Penrose rescues a mysterious girl, who inadvertently traveled from Ilandia in another dimension, and names her Tina after his deceased wife Christine. She soon escapes the hospital, displaying super powers to fend off a bully. Wonder Woman helps train and hone her powers, learning her real name is Amadonna. While trying find a way to get Amadonna home to "a world within this world", Wonder Woman must protect her from the evil genius Bleaker who lives at sea in a submarine, and who hopes to harness Tina's mystical energies for his own villainous purposes. Guest stars: Harry Guardino as Simon Penrose, Allan Arbus as Bleaker, and Julie Ann Haddock as Tina / Amadonna.
| 35 | 22 | "The Murderous Missile" | Dick Moder | Dick Nelson | April 21, 1978 |
Bad guys impersonate the entire populace of the small town of Burrogone as part of a plot to steal an experimental missile that can be guided by thought. When Wonder Woman finds the gang, she is gassed and faints, being taken prisoner. After using advanced gymnastics skills by jumping into the rafters to swing as if on uneven bars to distract and defeat her opponents, Wonder Woman spins up a motocross outfit, similar to her wetsuit, with the addition of a gold star-spangled crash helmet and large black goggles. She chases and captures their leader, "just George", who fled on a dirtbike. Guest stars: James Luisi as George, Mark Withers as Luther, Warren Stevens as Beal, Steve Inwood as Mac, Lucille Benson as Flo, Hal England as Hal Shaver, and Sam Edwards as Ernie.

=== Season 3 (1978–79) ===
| No. overall | No. in season | Title | Directed by | Written by | Original release date |
|---|---|---|---|---|---|
| 36 | 1 | "My Teenage Idol Is Missing" | Seymour Robbie | Anne Collins | September 22, 1978 |
Teenage pop star Lane is kidnapped and no one but Diana believes the only witness, a young fan Whitney. Lane's manager Ashton Ripley discovers and substitutes his long-lost identical twin brother Michael to perform a concert, while Wonder Woman rescues Lane. Guest stars: Michael Lerner as Ashton Ripley, Dawn Lyn as Whitney, Albert Paulsen as Crichton, and Leif Garrett as Lane / Michael. Notes: Features Leif Garrett's 1978 single "I Was Made for Dancin'". The Season 3 DVD includes Lynda Carter's audio commentary for this episode.
| 37 | 2 | "Hot Wheels" | Dick Moder | Dennis Landa | September 29, 1978 |
In order to recover top-secret plans on microfilm hidden in the hood ornament of a stolen car, Diana teams up with Inspector Tim Bolt from another law enforcement agency to hunt down car thief Otis Fiskle, but she is soon captured, gagged and bound. Guest stars: Lance LeGault as Otis Fiskle, Peter Brown as Inspector Tim Bolt, and Don Mitchell as Dr. Samson.
| 38 | 3 | "The Deadly Sting" | Alan Crosland Jr. | Dick Nelson | October 6, 1978 |
College football players are being manipulated into throwing their games and Wonder Woman must figure out who is behind the evil plot. Guest stars: Ron Ely as Bill Michaels, Scott Marlowe as Angie, Danny Dayton as Louis the Lithuanian, Marvin Miller as Beamer, Harvey Jason as Professor Brubaker, Gil Stratton as Broadcaster, Bob Minor as Nick, and Craig T. Nelson as Sam. Cameos include Roman Gabriel, Deacon Jones, Lawrence McCutcheon, and Eddie Bell as themselves. Notes: Features game footage of Notre Dame vs. Texas and Notre Dame vs. Southern California.
| 39 | 4 | "The Fine Art of Crime" | Dick Moder | Anne Collins | October 13, 1978 |
Wonder Woman investigates a series of robberies that lead her to faux artist Henry Roberts, who uses a device to turn people into living statues to help him commit his crimes. Wonder Woman falls into a trap, is turned into a statue and is exhibited at a museum. Guest stars: Ed Begley, Jr. as Harold Farnum, Joe E. Tata as Joe, Michael McGuire as Moreaux, Roddy McDowall as Henry Roberts, Gavin MacLeod as Mr. Ellsworth, and Joe Maross as Shubert.
| 40 | 5 | "Disco Devil" | Leslie H. Martinson | Alan Brennert | October 20, 1978 |
Nick, a telepathic disco dancer, is using his powers to steal information from government officials and scientists visiting a Washington, D.C., hot spot for its owner Angelique. Diana must enlist the aid of another telepath, Del Franklin, to foil the scheme. Guest stars: Paul Sand as Del Franklin, Ellen Weston as Angelique, Kerry Sherman as Kathy Munro, Victor Mohica as Lance, Robert Hoy as Norman, Michael DeLano as Nick Moreno, Russell Johnson as Colonel, Wolfman Jack as Infra Red, the disco's DJ, and Frank McRae as Foreman.
| 41 | 6 | "Formicida" | Alan Crosland Jr. | Katharyn Michaelian Powers | November 3, 1978 |
An environmentalist chemist turned eco-terrorist Formicida is determined to stop a pesticide manufacturer from marketing its latest formula. She creates a formula that gives her superhuman strength and the ability to control ants. Wonder Woman must stop her before she causes a disaster that will release clouds of toxic gas over the city. Guest stars: Robert Alda as Harcourt, Robert Shields as Doug, and Lorene Yarnell as Formicida. Notes: This is the only episode without any on-screen transformations from Diana to Wonder Woman.
| 42 | 7 | "Time Bomb" | Seymour Robbie | David Wise; Kathleen Barnes | November 10, 1978 |
Unethical scientist Cassandra Loren threatens to destroy history when she travels back in time from November 10, 2155 with plans to accumulate great wealth in the 20th century. Her fellow scientist Adam Clement teams with Wonder Woman to save the timeline, and reveals that Wonder Woman is still alive 200 years in the future. Guest stars: Joan Van Ark as Cassandra Loren, Allan Miller as Reynolds, and Ted Shackelford as Adam Clement. Notes: Includes special effects footage from the British science fiction series Space: 1999.
| 43 | 8 | "Skateboard Wiz" | Leslie H. Martinson | Alan Brennert | November 24, 1978 |
While Diana is on holiday visiting friends, teenage skateboarding prodigy Jamie is manipulated into helping hapless addict Duane Ron Masak win at illegal gambling. Ruthless casino owner and extortionist Donalsen goes after her when he catches Jamie eying his plans to take over the rest of the resort town by any means necessary. Wonder Woman spins up a skateboarding outfit, complete with knee and elbow pads and a helmet with a tiara design, in order to catch the bad guys and save Jamie from Donalsen's murderous henchmen. Guest stars: Eric Braeden as Donalsen, Ron Masak as Duane, Art Metrano as Friedman, and John Reilly as Skye.
| 44 | 9 | "The Deadly Dolphin" | Sigmund Neufeld Jr. | Jackson Gillis | December 1, 1978 |
Diana searches for a dolphin that has been kidnapped by greedy land developer Silas Lockhart in a scheme to contaminate the California coast with oil. In her wet suit and red swim fins, Wonder Woman emits energy bursts to scare off sharks. She tracks down Lockhart and his cronies but is captured, bound and gagged and tossed aboard the land developer's yacht. Diana escapes her bonds and thwarts the land developer's plans. Guest stars: Nicolas Coster as Silas Lockhart, Britt Leach as Billy, Albert Popwell as Gaffer, Michael Stroka as Henry, Brian Tochi as Darrell, and Penelope Windust as Dr. Sylvia Stubbs.
| 45 | 10 | "Stolen Faces" | Leslie H. Martinson | Richard Carr and Anne Collins | December 15, 1978 |
A woman named Nancy, dressed as Wonder Woman, ends up in the hospital after wearing her costume in public and saving a boy from being run over in traffic. After a failed attempt on the impostor's life, Diana beefs up security, which causes them to catch Nancy's unrequited admirer, Todd Daniels, who reveals that the fake Wonder Woman is a model. Her modeling agency is up to no good and hire yet another girl to be Wonder Woman. Diana must stop their plans to steal millions from the rich. Guest stars: Joseph Maher as Edgar Percy, Kenneth Tigar as John Austin, Bob Seagren as Roman, and Al White as Sergeant Cline.
| 46 | 11 | "Pot of Gold" | Gordon Hessler | Michael McGreevey | December 22, 1978 |
Diana travels to England to try to intercept counterfeit printing plates for $100 bills but fails. Meanwhile, small-time crook Bonelli schemes to steal gold bullion to buy the plates and hits upon an unlikely source – a pot of gold coins belonging to Pat O'Hanlon, who young Lisa believes is a leprechaun. Wonder Woman and O'Hanlon team up to track the plates and retrieve Pat's gold. Guest stars: Dick O'Neill as Pat O'Hanlon and Arthur Batanides as Maxwell.
| 47 | 12 | "Gault's Brain" | Gordon Hessler | S : John Gaynor; T : Arthur Weingarten | December 29, 1978 |
Aging billionaire Harlow Gault tries to regain his health and youth, keeping his brain alive after his death. Wonder Woman must prevent him from having his brain transplanted into the body of young Olympic hopeful, Morton Danzig. Guest stars: Floyd Levine as Stryker, Cathee Shirriff as Tara Landon, Peter Mark Richman as Dr. Crippin, and John Carradine as Harlow Gault.
| 48 | 13 | "Going, Going, Gone" | Alan Crosland Jr. | S : Patrick Mathews; T : Ann Collins and Patrick Mathews | January 12, 1979 |
Posing as Mrs. Fox, Diana infiltrates a criminal auction of a Russian nuclear warhead onboard an offshore submarine, putting her true identity at risk of discovery by the others in attendance. Guest stars: Bo Brundin as Vladimir Zukov, Charlie Brill as Mr. Smith, Kaz Garas as Lucas, Milton Selzer as Captain Louie, Marc Lawrence as Mr. Jones, Mako as Mr. Brown, and Hari Rhodes as Sheldon Como. Notes: Kaz Garas previously portrayed Steve Trevor in the 1974 television film.
| 49 | 14 | "Spaced Out" | Ivan Dixon | Bill Taylor | January 26, 1979 |
The race is on to find three laser crystals at a science fiction convention after cat burglar Kimball hides them in crates meant for the presenter, Sylvester Grogan. Guest stars: René Auberjonois as Kimball, George Cheung as Mr. Munn, Candy Brown as Janet, Paul Lawrence Smith as Simon Rohan, and Robby the Robot (uncredited).
| 50 | 15 | "The Starships Are Coming" | Alan Crosland Jr. | T : Anne Collins; S/T : Rod Baker and Glen Olson | February 2, 1979 |
Wonder Woman must find out the truth behind a supposed alien landing before serious consequences occur as a result. She finds the hideout of the people faking the alien invasion but is captured, bound and gagged. A time bomb is set to kill her, but she is saved by a young man searching for his camera. Diana exposes the fake alien invasion and saves the day. Guest stars: Tim O'Connor as Colonel Robert Elliot, Jeffrey Byron as Henry Wilson, David White as The General, and Andrew Duggan as Mason Steele.
| 51 | 16 | "Amazon Hot Wax" | Ray Austin | Alan Brennert | February 16, 1979 |
Going undercover to stop extortionists in the record industry has Diana showing off her singing abilities. Guest stars: Robert Hoy as Marty, Sarah Purcell as Barbi Gordon, Judge Reinhold as Jeff Gordon, Rick Springfield as Anton, Michael Botts as Kim, and Kate Woodville as Adele Kobler. Notes: Features Lynda Carter performing songs from her debut album Portrait.
| 52 | 17 | "The Richest Man in the World" | Don McDougall | Jackson Gillis and Anne Collins | February 19, 1979 |
Diana must find a reclusive millionaire Marshall Henshaw who's the only one who can help with a secret device that scrambles nuclear missile-guidance systems. Guest stars: Jeremy Slate as Marshall Henshaw, Roger Perry as Dunfield, Del Monroe as Thug, Carmen Zapata as The Prime Minister, Barry Miller as Barney, and Marlyn Mason as Lucy DeWitt.
| 53 | 18 | "A Date with Doomsday" | Curtis Harrington | Roland Starke and Dennis Landa | March 10, 1979 |
A computer-dating service is an unexpected place for a deadly virus vial that is stolen from a government lab. Diana goes undercover to infiltrate before it is released on the White House. Guest stars: Donnelly Rhodes as Ward Selkirk, Taaffe O'Connell as Val, Bob Hastings as George, Arthur Malet as Professor Zander, Hermione Baddeley as Mary Jane Thrip, and Patrick Cranshaw as Codger.
| 54 | 19 | "The Girl with a Gift for Disaster" | Alan Crosland Jr. | Alan Brennert | March 17, 1979 |
Bonnie Murphy's bizarre, jinx-like power to cause accidents around her is exploited by her boyfriend Mark Reuben to cover up his criminal activities. Guest stars: Jane Actman as Bonnie Murphy, Ina Balin as Dr. Koren, Dick Butkus as Neil, Charles Haid as Bob Baker, Raymond St. Jacques as William Mayfield, and James Sloyan as Mark Reuben.
| 55 | 20 | "The Boy Who Knew Her Secret" | Leslie H. Martinson | Anne Collins | May 28, 1979 |
| 56 | 21 | "The Boy Who Knew Her Secret" | Leslie H. Martinson | Anne Collins | May 29, 1979 |
Part 1: Diana travels to a small town where hundreds of people have begun acting strangely under the apparent influence of pyramids from outer space. Skip, a teenage boy trying to help Diana with her investigation, discovers that Diana Prince is Wonder Woman. Part 2: Skip, having discovered Wonder Woman's secret identity, investigates strange happenings in his town. Things, however, are not what they appear as the aliens taking over the local citizens are actually hunting down a galactic mass-murderer, which leads to a confrontation between Wonder Woman and alien shapeshifter Cameron, who had previously posed as her ally. Wonder Woman uses her magic lasso to make Skip forget her secret but he rediscovers the fact later when he listens to his tape-recorded journal. Guest stars: Michael Shannon as Cameron, John Milford as Mr. Keller, Tegan West as Pete Pearson, Bert Remsen as Dr. Jaffe, and Clark Brandon as Skip. Notes: Dialogue in this episode sets up Diana's move to Los Angeles. For the first time, Wonder Woman does not smile at the end of the story, due to realizing that her attempt to make Skip forget her true identity was compromised.
| 57 | 22 | "The Man Who Could Not Die" | John Newland | Anne Collins | August 28, 1979 |
On her first day after relocating to Los Angeles, Diana encounters an indestructible chimpanzee. This leads her to scientist Joseph Reichman, who through a combination of chemicals and radiation has also made a man, Bryce Candall, indestructible. Bryce and Wonder Woman join forces to foil the scientist's plan to create an army of indestructible men to take over the world. Guest stars: Robert Sampson as Dr. Akers, Bob Seagren as Bryce Candall, John Aprea as Dupris, and James Bond III as T. Burton Phipps III. Notes: This was the last episode to be produced for the series, but was shown out of sequence. Steve Trevor does not appear, and would have been permanently written-out if the show had continued for a 4th season.
| 58 | 23 | "Phantom of the Roller Coaster" | John Newland | Anne Collins | September 4, 1979 |
| 59 | 24 | "Phantom of the Roller Coaster" | John Newland | Anne Collins | September 11, 1979 |
Part 1: Orphan teenager Randy goes missing for days at a Washington amusement park where he encounters the severely disfigured Vietnam veteran David Gurney who lives under the roller coasters and "haunts" the park as its "phantom". Meanwhile, Harrison Fynch, leader of a foreign spy ring, schemes to wrest ownership of the park from David's older brother, Leon Gurney. Part 2: While searching for Fynch, Diana finds Randy with David, and foils Fynch's plot to sabotage a rollercoaster to buy the park cheaply. Guest stars: Jared Martin as David Gurney / Leon Gurney, Joseph Sirola as Harrison Fynch, Marc Alaimo as Pierce, and Ike Eisenmann as Randy. Notes: This two-part episode was aired out of sequence within the series and should have come before the preceding episode, "The Man Who Could Not Die", in which Diana had relocated to Los Angeles permanently. In this story, however, she is still working in Washington, D.C., with Steve Trevor.
