= Wonder Woman (2011 TV pilot) =

- Genre: Superhero
- Based on: Wonder Woman by: William Moulton Marston; H. G. Peter
- Written by: David E. Kelley
- Directed by: Jeffrey Reiner
- Starring: Adrianne Palicki; Elizabeth Hurley; Cary Elwes; Pedro Pascal; Edward Herrmann; Tracie Thoms; Justin Bruening
- Theme music composer: Chris Bacon
- Opening theme: "I Only Know How to Love" by Christina Aguilera
- Country of origin: United States
- Original language: English

Production
- Executive producers: Bill D'Elia; David E. Kelley
- Producer: Tommy Burns
- Cinematography: Colin Watkinson
- Camera setup: Single-camera setup
- Running time: 43 minutes
- Production companies: Warner Bros. Television; DC Entertainment

Wonder Woman is an unaired superhero television pilot produced by Warner Bros. Television and DC Entertainment for NBC, loosely based on the DC Comics character of the same name. David E. Kelley wrote the pilot, which was directed by Jeffrey Reiner. Adrianne Palicki starred as the main character and Elizabeth Hurley as the main villain. The Wonder Woman pilot was expected to debut in 2011, but NBC opted not to buy the series.

Pedro Pascal, who played Ed Indelicato in the pilot, was later cast in another Wonder Woman project, the 2020 film Wonder Woman 1984.

== Plot ==
In an inner city home, a teenager tells his family that he has been accepted into college, moments before he begins convulsing and bleeding from the eyes and ears. Meanwhile, Wonder Woman is on a foot chase with a super-strength criminal on Hollywood Blvd and, after knocking him out, takes a sample of his blood and leaves him to the police. Wonder Woman returns to the headquarters of Themyscira Industries, a large corporation which she runs as the CEO in her alter-ego of Diana Themyscira. Themyscira Industries owns and operates the concept of Wonder Woman as both a privately run crime-fighting operation and for marketing the image of Wonder Woman as a role model to the outside world. Diana has trouble balancing her life as both the CEO of the corporation and as Wonder Woman. Diana's frustration with having to maintain a perfect image to the outside world in both these capacities leads her to create a third identity for herself, "Diana Prince", so that she can have an element of normalcy in her life and sit at home with her cat watching romantic comedies and surfing the internet. At Themyscira Industries, Diana grows suspicious of evil businesswoman Veronica Cale for distributing an illegal performance-enhancing drug that gives users super-human strength and endurance, but can cause death through repeated use.

The blood sample she draws from the Hollywood Blvd fight and the story of the college-bound teen confirm Diana's suspicions. Without enough hard evidence to bring Cale to justice as Wonder Woman, Diana holds a press conference and airs her beliefs about Cale to the world. Cale, in turn, confronts Diana in person to intimidate her and threaten legal action. In a flashback, Diana ends up breaking it off with her boyfriend Steve Trevor because of her busy life. Back in the present day, the college-bound teenager dies from his drug sickness, and Diana is galvanized to confront Cale as Wonder Woman. She arrives at Cale's facilities, defeats all of her super-powered henchmen, and confronts Cale face-to-face. Cale threatens legal action and to release security footage of Wonder Woman killing the henchmen, but Wonder Woman responds by pulling Cale down with her lasso and throwing her against the wall. Later, Cale is put in jail, and a Justice Department representative comes to meet Diana. This turns out to be Steve Trevor, who says that he will be working with Diana in her capacity as Wonder Woman, but also reveals that he has married another woman.

== Cast and characters ==
- Adrianne Palicki as Diana Prince / Diana Themyscira / Princess Diana of Themyscira / Wonder Woman, the title role.
- Elizabeth Hurley as Veronica Cale, the villain.
- Tracie Thoms as Etta Candy, Diana's personal assistant.
- Pedro Pascal as Ed Indelicato, Wonder Woman's liaison to the police department.
- Cary Elwes as Henry Detmer, who runs the day-to-day operations of Diana's company.
- Justin Bruening as Steve Trevor, Diana's former boyfriend who works for the Justice Department.

Nancy Grace and Phil McGraw make cameo appearances as themselves.

== Design ==
Adrianne Palicki as Wonder Woman

In the pilot's first two acts, Wonder Woman wears a new version of her classic comic book uniform: the familiar red top with gold "W" insignia chestplate (formerly an eagle symbol chestplate) is still used, as are her golden belt and Lasso of Truth, but these are now worn with blue slacks that have gold stars running along the sides, rather than with shorts. Her boots are blue with gold trim (whereas the traditional boots were red and had white, vertical trim). Her bulletproof bracelets/gauntlets are more stylized, and her tiara is much thinner. During the final act of the pilot, when Wonder Woman flies to Cale's hidden laboratory for the final showdown with the villain, her clothing switches from the blue pants to the more recognizable shorts.

Though Wonder Woman's Magic Golden Lasso is referred to as the "Lasso of Truth" by a reporter in the episode, she never uses it to magically compel anyone to tell the truth. For instance, in the first act, she uses the Lasso to end a pursuit of a man down city streets at night. In a later scene, she breaks the arm of one of Cale's henchmen to "make him talk" instead of using the Lasso's magic. In this interpretation of Wonder Woman, the Lasso is only employed as an entangling weapon; Wonder Woman snaps it around a target (usually the neck), then jerks it roughly, throwing the target off-balance. Her bracelets can still stop bullets (as in the Lynda Carter-starring, 1975-79 TV series). For example, she uses them to protect herself from a security guard's gunfire during the episode's climax (and retaliates by hurling a steel pipe at the hapless guard, impaling him through the neck and killing him instantly). One of this interpretation's greatest departures from Wonder Woman canon might be its version of her invisible plane/"the Invisible Jet". Here, she gets around Los Angeles in a very small, one-seater aircraft that is reminiscent of a shuttlecraft in a sci-fi space TV show. While highly sophisticated, the plane is also highly visible (painted an opaque white).

== Production ==
Reports surfaced in October 2010 that Warner Bros. Television was teaming with writer-producer David E. Kelley to pitch a new Wonder Woman television series to networks. The major networks all turned down the series, but NBC, the final network to initially pass on the project, ordered a pilot in January 2011. Jeffrey Reiner was hired to direct the pilot the following month. The same month, Adrianne Palicki was selected to play the title role. Lynette Rice of Entertainment Weekly commented that compared to Lynda Carter's costume, Palicki's costume de-emphasized patriotism and played up the character's Greek mythological origin. Lynda Carter herself said Palicki looked gorgeous. Kyle Buchanan of New York said that the costume "looked less like a superhero outfit and more like a Project Runway challenge gone awry, the kind of thing Nina Garcia would dismiss by sniffing, 'Shiny, cheap, and tacky'". Borys Kit of The Hollywood Reporter pointed out that the costume was causing a divide, with many exclaiming it was "too trashy and too bad porn-y". After the first official images of Palicki in costume were revealed, Fox News republished a story criticizing the loss of Wonder Woman's American symbolism. Warner Bros. later changed the costume, replacing the blue boots and rubbery pants, due to fan criticism, but in the episode "Gorilla My Dreams" of Kelley's show Harry's Law, Erica Durance (best known as Lois Lane from the television series Smallville) as Annie Bilson, wears the original costume now with red boots.

Elizabeth Hurley and Tracie Thoms were cast as villain Veronica Cale and Diana's personal assistant Etta Candy, respectively in March 2011. Pedro Pascal was cast as Ed Indelicato, Wonder Woman's liaison to the police department, and Cary Elwes as Henry Detmer, who runs the day-to-day operations of Diana's company. Actor Justin Bruening was cast to play Steve Trevor. A few weeks later, while the pilot was still in production, a photograph of Palicki as Wonder Woman was featured on the cover of the April 11–17 edition of TV Guide as part of its "Fall Sneak Peek" feature.

The plot is described as "a reinvention of the iconic DC Comic in which Wonder Woman – aka Diana Prince – is a vigilante crime fighter in L.A., but also a successful corporate executive and a modern woman, trying to balance all of the elements of her extraordinary life". No clear reference is made to Diana or her superhero persona of Wonder Woman being a true Amazon or coming from the legendary island of Themyscira, except one vague line of dialog during a board room scene. Within the pilot's own self-contained narrative, Wonder Woman's origins appear to be without any of the mystical elements from her comic book origins.

NBC later decided not to pick up the project for a series in May of the same year. Though the pilot never officially aired, it was leaked on YouTube but later removed.

== Reception ==
After watching the pilot, television critic Alan Sepinwall described it as "embarrassing ... [I]t was all I had feared, and more". Writing about the show for Flickering Myth in 2017, Neil Calloway said "it has its moments ... but it was probably dated in 2011 ... We didn't really lose anything by it not being commissioned into a series".

In an interview with The Hollywood Reporter, creator David E. Kelley admitted his mistakes, but says he would do it again if he could:

We made mistakes with ours. My only regret is that we were never given a chance to correct them. We had a lot that was right about it and a great cast. In time, we could have fixed what we had done wrong, but we just didn't get that chance.

In 2020, Adrianne Palicki said: "It was devastating when it didn't go. It was so big. I feel like maybe if it had been made one or two more years later, it would've been a shoo-in". One year later, Pedro Pascal said he was "devastated" that the show was not picked up: "I love Adrianne Palicki. I love David E. Kelley and I thought it was a very, very risky and interesting take in terms of what they were trying to do".

== See also ==
- Wonder Woman - 1974 television film by Vincent McEveety
- Wonder Woman - television series
- Wonder Woman - superhero film by Patty Jenkins
