= Coach (1978 film) =

- Theatrical release poster
- Directed by: Bud Townsend
- Written by: Stephen Bruce Rose; Nancy Larson; Mark Tenser
- Produced by: Newton P. Jacobs; Mark Tenser; Will Zens
- Starring: Cathy Lee Crosby; Michael Biehn; Keenan Wynn; Channing Clarkson; Steve Nevil; Jack David Walker
- Cinematography: Michael D. Murphy
- Edited by: Robert Gordon
- Music by: Anthony Harris
- Production company: Marimark Productions
- Distributed by: Crown International Pictures
- Release date: March 17, 1978
- Running time: 100 minutes
- Country: United States
- Language: English
- Box office: $2.2 million (US/Canada rentals) or $3 million

Coach is a 1978 American sport comedy film directed by Bud Townsend and starring Cathy Lee Crosby, Michael Biehn, Keenan Wynn, Channing Clarkson, Steve Nevil, and Jack David Walker. The film was released by Crown International Pictures in March 1978.

== Plot ==
Randy Rawlings is an Olympic-caliber athlete who is mistakenly hired as the head coach of the Fillmore High School boys' basketball team after Harold Mitchell, the school's assistant coach, sent a telegram hiring Randy. The phone was out of order, so Mitchell took the initiative and wired the job offer to Randy via telegram without confirming details or board approval. Despite the initial shock and skepticism from the school board and the players when they become aware of her gender, Randy decides to take the job. Athletic director Fenton 'F.R.' Granger is required to hire her, as the telegram was a binding contract and the school doesn't want a sex discrimination lawsuit, but retains her under the condition she will be fired upon her first loss for incompetence.

The Fillmore team is a group of underachieving misfits who are more interested in chasing girls and partying than winning games. Randy implements a rigorous training regimen and uses her athletic expertise to transform the team. To assist in the basketball training and to win the team over, she prevails upon Sidney Wicks of the NBA to meet with the team and give them advice. A significant subplot involves the star player, Jack, who finds himself falling in love with his new coach. Randy must navigate the ethical boundaries of her position while motivating Jack to reach his full potential on the court. Randy and Jack ultimately have an affair.

The film follows the team's progression from a laughingstock to a championship contender. The climax features a high-stakes title game where the players must prove that Randy's unconventional coaching methods have paid off. In the end, the team wins the championship and Randy earns the respect of the school and the community.

== Cast ==
- Cathy Lee Crosby as Randy Rawlings
- Michael Biehn as Jack Ripley
- Keenan Wynn as Fenton 'F.R.' Granger
- Channing Clarkson as Bradley William David Granger
- Steve Nevil as Ralph
- Jack David Walker as Ned
- Meridith Baer as Janet
- Myron McGill as Danny
- Robyn Pohle as Candy
- Kristine Greco as Darlene
- Brent Huff as Keith
- Cindy Daly as Wanda
- Rosanne Katon as Sue
- Lenka Novak as Marilyn
- Otto Felix as Tom
- Milt Oberman as Coach Bresnehan
- Bill McLean as Harold Mitchell (as Bill McClean)
- Patricia Garrison as Mrs. Granger
- Ted Dawson as Marvin Chomsky
- Nate Roth as Sam
- Barbara Minkus as Miss Fishman
- Ron Wright as Coach Gorman
- Robert Webb as Stallion Player
- Derek Barton as Bull Player
- Tom Mahoney as Janitor
- Mark Spencer as Referee
- Tikki Goldberg as Secretary
- Sidney Wicks as himself
- Luther Fear as Asst. coach (uncredited)

== Production ==
Coach was produced during the late-1970s boom of sports-themed comedies. Directed by Bud Townsend, who previously helmed The Nightmare (1970), the film was distributed by Crown International Pictures. The production is notable for featuring early career appearances by future stars, including Michael Biehn (later of The Terminator) and Rhea Perlman (of Cheers fame).

The film was shot on location in Southern California, utilizing local high school facilities to maintain its low budget. It capitalized on the star power of Cathy Lee Crosby, who was a household name at the time due to her professional tennis background and her role in the 1974 Wonder Woman television pilot.

=== Retrospective views ===
In a 2017 interview for the film's high-definition release, Cathy Lee Crosby reflected on the production with nostalgia, noting that she appreciated the character's athletic competence. She characterized the experience as a positive one that helped establish her persona before her transition to television hosting. She has spoken warmly about her chemistry with a young Michael Biehn (in his film debut). While modern audiences often find the student-teacher romance subplot controversial or "taboo," Crosby recalls the production as a lighthearted, "innocent" time in filmmaking. She viewed the relationship in the script more as a romantic underdog story typical of the era's comedies rather than something predatory.

== Reception ==
In its first 60 days, the film grossed $2,735,822 from 74 theaters in the United States and Canada and went on to generate theatrical rentals of $2.2 million.

== Critical reception ==
Upon its release in 1978, Coach received mixed reviews. Some critics praised its lighthearted tone and Crosby's performance, while others criticized it as a derivative attempt to capitalize on the success of films like The Bad News Bears (1976).

An edited version of the film became a staple of late-night television throughout the 1980s. Modern retrospective reviews often highlight the film's "time capsule" quality, capturing the fashion, car culture, and slang of the late 1970s.

== Home media ==
- VHS: The film saw several releases on VHS during the 1980s via budget labels such as Media Home Entertainment.
- DVD: Coach was released on DVD by BCI Eclipse as part of their "Drive-In Movie Classics" series.
- Blu-ray: In 2017, the film was released on Blu-ray by Scorpion Releasing. This edition featured a new 2K restoration from the original film elements and included an interview with star Cathy Lee Crosby.
