= Patrick Cronin (actor) =

American actor (born 1941)

- Born: April 11, 1941 (age 85); Philadelphia, Pennsylvania, U.S.
- Occupation: Actor
- Years active: 1966–present
- Spouses: Beatrice Colen (m. 1977; died 1999) Amber Kinser (m. 2004)
- Children: 2
- Website: www.patrickjcronin.com/index.html

Patrick Cronin (born April 11, 1941) is an American stage, television, and film actor best known for his television appearances spanning five decades.

== Biography ==
Cronin is a son of Ann McGlynn and Patrick Cronin Sr. After graduating from La Salle College High School, Cronin attended La Salle University where he received a bachelor's degree. He went on to earn a master's degree in theater from Temple University.

As of at least 2005 and through 2019, he is a professor of theater at East Tennessee State University in Johnson City, Tennessee. He is the former holder of The Basler Chair and the first holder of the Permanent Artist in Residence position at East Tennessee State University.

== Family ==
Cronin married actress Beatrice Colen, granddaughter of playwright George S. Kaufman, on October 23, 1977. It lasted until her death on November 18, 1999. She succumbed to lung cancer at Cedars-Sinai Medical Center. The couple had two sons, James and Charles. Cronin has been married to his present wife, Dr. Amber Kinser, since 2004.

== Filmography ==
- All in the Family (1977, TV Series) .... Brian Schlemmer
- Wonderbug (1977, TV Series)
- Operation Petticoat (1978, TV Series)
- Carter Country (1978, TV Series) .... Dr. Grant
- Fantasy Island (1978, TV Series) .... Harry
- Just You and Me, Kid (1979) .... Doctor
- Alice (1979, TV Series) .... Jason Carp / Judd
- Brave New World (1980, TV Movie) .... Gamma Male
- Sanford (1980, TV Series) .... Man Robber
- One Day at a Time (1981, TV Series) .... Mr. Pierson
- The Brady Brides (1981, TV Series) .... Inspector Mann
- Archie Bunker's Place (1981, TV Series) .... Mr. Atchison
- Too Close for Comfort (1982, TV Series) .... Mr. Beckley / Clifford
- She's with Me (1982, TV Short) .... Chatfield
- Silver Spoons (1983, TV Series) .... Willard Doyle
- Foot in the Door (1983, TV Series) .... Calvin
- Splash (1984) .... Michaelson
- Boys in Blue (1984, TV Movie) .... Drunk
- The Cartier Affair (1984, TV Movie)
- Remington Steele (1984, TV Series) .... Jackson Grimm
- Hill Street Blues (1984–1985, TV Series) .... Albert Desjardin / Mr. Desjardins
- Diff'rent Strokes (1985, TV Series) .... Jenkins
- Cheers (1986, TV Series) .... Bert Simpson
- The Love Boat (1986, TV Series) .... Eddie Dumont
- L.A. Law (1986, TV Series) .... Lester Mestman
- Knots Landing (1986, TV Series) .... Marty Sweeney / Jules Posner
- Gimme a Break! (1987, TV Series) .... Mr. Gronimeyer
- J.J. Starbuck (1987, TV Series) .... Harold Smythe
- Rampage (1987) .... Harry Bellenger
- 21 Jump Street (1987, TV Series) .... Al Bernard
- The Facts of Life (1987, TV Series) .... Chris Morgan
- I Married Dora (1987, TV Series) .... Graves
- The Oldest Rookie (1987-1988, TV Series) .... Chief Black
- Shakedown on the Sunset Strip (1988, TV Movie) .... Adams (chairman)
- Night Court (1988, TV Series) .... Mr. Carney
- It's a Living (1989, TV Series) .... Lt. Mogul
- The Wonder Years (1989, TV Series) .... Marvin Lutz
- It's Garry Shandling's Show (1990, TV Series) .... Al Pine
- 227 (1990, TV Series) .... Robert Howard
- A Family for Joe (1990, TV Movie) .... Mr. Reed
- Dallas (1990, TV Series) .... Al Ludecello
- ABC Afterschool Specials (1990, TV Series)
- Sibling Rivalry (1990) .... Gary Diamond
- Rocky V (1990) .... Dr. Rimlan
- Ferris Bueller (1990, TV Series) .... Phil Weldon
- Lucy & Desi: Before the Laughter (1991, TV Movie) .... Doc Bender
- Star Trek: The Next Generation (1992, TV Series) .... Protocol Master Erko
- Dr. Giggles (1992) .... Sheriff Harper
- Doogie Howser, M.D. (1993, TV Series) .... Dr. Brian Horshlower
- The Powers That Be (1993, TV Series) .... Security Guard
- Full House (1993, TV Series) .... Phil
- Family Matters (1994, TV Series) .... Mr. Sweeney / Mr. Howard
- Saved by the Bell: The New Class (1994, TV Series) .... Woodbury
- Party of Five (1995, TV Series) .... Salesman
- Mad About You (1995, TV Series) .... Postal Worker
- Seinfeld (1995, TV Series) .... Sid Farkus
- Weird Science (1995, TV Series) .... Mr. Tate
- Sisters (1996, TV Series) .... Potter Bellencamp
- Diagnosis: Murder (1996, TV Series) .... Mr. Alfredson
- The Pretender (1997, TV Series) .... Herb Copeland
- Breast Men (1997, TV Movie) .... Committee Head
- Just Shoot Me! (1998, TV Series) .... Principal
- Style & Substance (1998, TV Series) .... Jack Webster
- Home Improvement (1996-1999, TV Series) George "Sparky" Henderson
- The Magnificent Seven (2000, TV Series) .... Preston Wingo
- Sabrina, the Teenage Witch (2001, TV Series) .... Wayne
- Forever for Now (2004) .... Mr. Farnsworth
- Army Wives (2012, TV Series) .... Ken Upton
- This World (2013) .... Rob
- Brontosaurus (2017) .... Dale
