= Steve Trevor =

DC Comics character

- Steve Trevor as depicted in Wonder Woman vol. 5 #14 (March 2017). Art by Nicola Scott and Romulo Fajardo Jr.

Publication information
- Publisher: DC Comics
- First appearance: All Star Comics #8 (October 21, 1941) (Note: All Star Comics #8 was cover-dated December–January 1941–1942, but published October 21, 1941.)
- Created by: William Moulton Marston; H. G. Peter

In-story information
- Full name: Steven Rockwell Trevor
- Team affiliations: United States Air Force; Central Intelligence Agency; Justice League; A.R.G.U.S. United States Army Air Forces; Office of Strategic Services; Justice League Dark; Justice Society of America; Team 7
- Supporting character of: Wonder Woman
- Notable aliases: Steve Howard

General Steven Rockwell Trevor is a fictional character appearing in American comic books published by DC Comics, commonly in association with the superhero Wonder Woman. The character was created by William Moulton Marston and first appeared in All Star Comics #8 (October 21, 1941). Steve Trevor is a trusted friend, love interest, and partner of Wonder Woman who introduced her to "Man's World", and has served as her United Nations liaison. He is the first foreigner to have ever set foot on Themyscira and the first ambassador to open diplomatic relations with the Amazons.

The character has appeared in various adaptations of the comics. He has been voiced by actors such as Tahmoh Penikett, Nathan Fillion, and George Newbern, among others in various Wonder Woman and Justice League productions. Lyle Waggoner portrayed the character in the 1970s Wonder Woman series, while Chris Pine portrayed him in the DC Extended Universe films Wonder Woman (2017) and Wonder Woman 1984 (2020).

== Publication history ==
Steve Trevor first appeared in All Star Comics #8 (December 1941).

=== Pre-Crisis ===
Steve Trevor was originally introduced as an intelligence operative and officer in the United States Army Air Corps who became stranded on Wonder Woman's homeland where he was a herald to the Amazons that World War II was occurring in "Man's World". He also developed a close relationship with the heroine. Though a military man with experience in the field, storylines involving post-Marston Steve and Wonder Woman also involved Wonder Woman coming to Steve's rescue, as well as vice versa.

The character was killed off in Wonder Woman #180 (January - February 1969), shot by the henchmen of Doctor Cyber. In a WW letter column in issue #195, artist Mike Sekowsky explained, "Steve Trevor was dull and boring and I didn't like him much, so I disposed of him." The character was later resurrected by another creative team.

Steve's visibility in comics varied through the 1970s to the 1990s, with his character either absent or sidelined in favour of fantasy and action-adventure Wonder Woman stories without romantic interests.

=== Post-Crisis ===
In more recent portrayals, and particularly since DC's 2011 reboot, Steve is portrayed as a senior government agent and super spy whose close connection to Wonder Woman makes him the United States' liaison to the Justice League. In 2013, in his capacity as a skilled government agent, Steve himself became the member of a new incarnation of the Justice League of America.

== Characterization ==
=== Personality ===
The character was designed to be a complement to Wonder Woman's character. Chris Pine described Trevor as a "rogue-ish, cynical realist who's seen the awful brutish nature of modern civilization" and added he is a "worldly guy, a charming guy". Steve Trevor gave Diana the nickname, "Angel", because having been delirious from his injuries, Themyscira seemed heaven-like with her being the "angel" that saved him. Throughout his comic book appearances Steve is often shown to have a strong moral compass and has been depicted as jaded and even insubordinate towards his superior officers if he deems their decisions to be unethical.

Steve Trevor is the first foreigner to have ever set foot on Themyscira, the first man Diana has ever seen, and the first ambassador to open diplomatic relations with the Amazons. Trevor, Superman, and Batman are the only men to be granted honorary citizenship by Queen Hippolyta; an extraordinary feat, given that Aphrodite's Law demands the death penalty for any man who sets foot on Themyscira. He was often Diana's primary love interest and their relationship was usually a flirtatious one, yet they always remained steadfast friends. On occasion, Marston would place Trevor in "gentleman-in-jeopardy" situations as an appropriate male version of the damsel in distress trope. His marriage proposals were often rejected, as Diana prioritized saving the world first before marriage, in accordance with Aphrodite's Law. In later stories, Steve and Diana's relationship has become more platonic, or at times either of their love is unrequited.

== Fictional character biography ==
=== 20th century ===
==== Golden Age ====
In the original version of Wonder Woman's origin story, Steve Trevor was an intelligence officer in the United States Army Air Forces during World War II whose plane crashed on Paradise Island, the isolated homeland of the Amazons. He was nursed back to health by the Amazon princess Diana, who fell in love with him and accompanied him when he returned to the outside world. There she became Wonder Woman (and also his coworker, Diana Prince).

Steve Trevor was portrayed as a blonde military hero who often fought battles both alone and alongside Wonder Woman. At the same time, he was also a traditional superhero's love interest and gentleman-in-jeopardy: getting kidnapped and being rescued from peril by Wonder Woman, as well as pining after the superheroine in the red-and-blue outfit while failing to notice her resemblance to his meek, bespectacled secretary Diana Prince. Although, at times, Steve has rescued Wonder Woman. The character was purposely made blond, which stemmed from William Moulton Marston’s belief that the best romantic combination is a blue-eyed brunette girl to a light-haired man, because blond males are more submissive to brunette females, according to him.

==== Silver and Bronze Age ====
After Marston's death, much of the original supporting cast paid less attention to him. Under writer-editor Robert Kanigher, both his and Diana's personalities were compromised considerably, with Steve beginning to seem threatened by his heroine's power, and Diana almost beginning to seem apologetic about it.

During the '50s and '60s, comic writers regularly made Wonder Woman lovesick over Steve Trevor, here a Major in the United States Army. Stories frequently featured Wonder Woman hoping or imagining what it would be like to marry Steve Trevor. As with Superman stories of the same period, the question of marriage was never far from the couple's minds. There was also considerable attention given to the threat of the Amazon's secret identity being revealed.

Wonder Woman often found herself agreeing to Steve's contests for her hand in marriage, which he typically cheated at using government tracking equipment. Afraid that she loved someone else; Steve once again misused government spying equipment to stalk Wonder Woman, finding her with her childhood boyfriend Mer-Man; whom he felt the need to prove himself better than.

In 1968, Diana chose to give up her powers and cut ties with her native Paradise Island to stay close to Steve. Trevor was killed off in the next issue. He was thus absent for the next few years of the comic. In the mid-1970s, following the return of the heroine's powers, Trevor was brought back to life by Aphrodite, and given a new identity as the brunette Steve Howard. In 1978, he was killed off again. He would be replaced in 1980 by a double from another, undisclosed dimension of the multiverse. For the next few years, the classic relationship of Wonder Woman and Steve Trevor would be essentially restored, and explored with some detail. In 1985 with issue #322, writer Dan Mishkin dealt with Trevor's three separate "lives", and after much explanation merged the "new" Steve with the old.

During this same period in early 1980s issues of Wonder Woman, the villainous Doctor Psycho fused Steve's image with Wonder Woman's abilities and became "Captain Wonder", sporting a costume similar to Wonder Woman's. In the final issue of the original Wonder Woman series, Steve and Diana get married.

==== Modern Age ====
Following the Crisis on Infinite Earths continuity reboot, Steve Trevor is the Deputy Secretary of Defense and married to Etta Candy. His mother Diana previously crash-landed on Themyscira and sacrificed herself to rescue the Amazons from a monster, with Hippolyta naming Diana after her.

=== 21st century ===
==== Infinite Crisis ====
Following Infinite Crisis, Wonder Woman's origin and supporting cast are revamped. Diana is no longer a recent arrival to man's world, but instead has lived in it for some time, having been involved in the creation of the Justice League of America. Although Steve Trevor still remains close friends with Diana and married to Etta, his history with Diana is not fully developed.

==== The New 52 ====
In The New 52 continuity reboot, Steve Trevor is a long-time advocate for the Amazons, having lobbied the U.S. government for peace with the Amazons, arguing that they are benevolent. Steve then becomes Wonder Woman's U.N. liaison during her stay in Washington, D.C., and later becomes the head of A.R.G.U.S. (Advanced Research Group for Uniting Super-Humans) and the UN's liaison to the Justice League. Promoted to the rank of Colonel, his assistant is Etta Candy and he has made his feelings for Wonder Woman clear to her, although his feelings were not reciprocated. The hero Black Orchid is revealed to be A.R.G.U.S. agent Alba Garcia, working covertly for Justice League Dark to monitor John Constantine.

Trevor is also a member of several team books, including Team 7, which launched in September 2012, and Justice League of America, launched in 2013.

The pre-Crisis version of Trevor appears in Convergence, where he is transformed into a vampire by vampires from Earth-43.

==== DC Rebirth ====
In the DC Rebirth relaunch, Wonder Woman's origin is retold in the "Year One" storyline. Steve crashes on Themyscira and is the sole survivor. He is saved and nursed back to health by the Amazons, and a competition is held to determine the one to take Steve and the bodies of his fallen comrades back to America, one that Diana wins. In the United States, Trevor relates to the authorities his experiences with the Amazons and Diana, and the two become allies in subsequent conflicts with terrorists, the Greek god of war Ares, a global virus, an African cult, a paramilitary group called Poison, and the supervillain group Godwatch.

In Wonder Woman (vol. 6), Trevor is killed by Sovereign. Trevor is later revealed to have survived and is held captive on Themyscira until Wonder Woman heads to rescue him.

== Other versions ==
- An alternate universe version of Steve Trevor appears in Wonder Woman: Amazonia. This version is a Royal Marine who is later killed by Wonder Woman after he massacres the Amazons.
- Trevor Castle, a fusion of Steve Trevor and Marvel Comics character the Punisher, appears in Amalgam Comics.
- An alternate universe version of Steve Trevor appears in Flashpoint. He attempts to rescue Lois Lane from imprisonment on Themyscira before being killed by Wonder Woman.
- An alternate universe version of Steve Trevor appears in Wonder Woman: Earth One. This version is African-American.
- An alternate universe version of Steve Trevor appears in The Legend of Wonder Woman.
- An alternate universe version of Steve Trevor appears in Absolute Wonder Woman. This version died and was sent to Hell before being rescued and returned to the living world with help from Diana and Circe.

== In other media ==
=== Television ===
==== Live-action ====
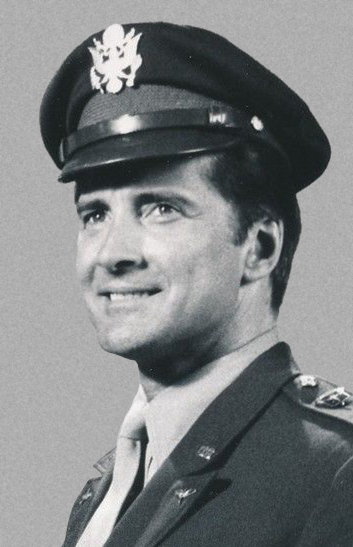
Lyle Waggoner as Steve Trevor in the Wonder Woman television series.

- Steve Trevor appears in Wonder Woman (1974), portrayed by Kaz Garas.
- Steve Trevor Sr. and Jr. appear in Wonder Woman (1975), both portrayed by Lyle Waggoner. Both are allies of Wonder Woman and U.S. Air Force officers and pilots, with Trevor Sr. having fought in WWII and Trevor Jr. in the 1970s.
- Steve Trevor appears in Wonder Woman (2011), portrayed by Justin Bruening. This version is a Justice Department lawyer.

==== Animation ====
- Steve Trevor makes a non-speaking cameo appearance in the Super Friends: The Legendary Super Powers Show episode "Mr. Mxyzptlk and the Magic Lamp".
- Steve Trevor appears in The Super Powers Team: Galactic Guardians episode "The Darkseid Deception", voiced by Darryl Hickman. This version is an astronaut.
- Steve Trevor appears in the Justice League three-part episode "The Savage Time", voiced by Patrick Duffy. This version is an Allied secret agent. After being rescued by Wonder Woman, who joined the Justice League in traveling back in time to stop Vandal Savage from helping Nazi Germany win WWII, she and Trevor develop a brief, flirtatious relationship before she returns to the present, where she briefly visits an elderly Trevor at the retirement home in the United States that Trevor currently resides in when Wonder Woman returns to the United States.
- Steve Trevor appears in Batman: The Brave and the Bold, voiced by Sean Donnellan.
- A young, contemporary Steve Trevor appears in DC Super Hero Girls (2019), voiced by Yuri Lowenthal. This version enrolls in Metropolis High School after being rejected from a military academy. In his most notable appearance in the two-part episode "#DCSuperHeroBoys", he becomes the leader of the "Invincibros" despite his lack of powers or combat training because the other members believe him to be wise.

=== Film ===
==== Live-action ====
Captain Steve Trevor appears in films set in the DC Extended Universe (DCEU), portrayed by Chris Pine.

- Introduced in Wonder Woman (2017), this version is a United States Army Air Service pilot with the 94th Aero Squadron and the American Expeditionary Forces and an Allied spy during World War I. After stealing information on a deadlier form of mustard gas being developed by Dr. Isabel Maru on General Erich Ludendorff's behalf, Trevor crashes his plane on Themyscira, where Diana Prince learns of the war he is involved in and leaves with him to end it. As Trevor guides her into the world outside of Themyscira and how mankind functions, they grow closer despite conflicts over how to stop the war, with him focusing on stopping Maru while she wants to kill Ares. Ultimately, Trevor tells Prince that he loves her and leaves her his father's watch as a keepsake before hijacking a German strategic bomber containing the gas and sacrificing himself to incinerate it at a safe distance. This act leads to Prince believing the world can only be saved through love, not hatred.
- In Wonder Woman 1984, Prince comes into contact with the Dreamstone and unknowingly wishes for Trevor to come back to life, causing his soul to manifest in the body of an unnamed man (portrayed by Kristoffer Polaha), with Prince recognizing him as the former while everyone else sees the latter. While guiding him through the 1980s, among other changes since WWI, they work together to find out more about the Dreamstone and stop Maxwell Lord, who acquired the Dreamstone's powers and is unknowingly causing global chaos, as well as Barbara Ann Minerva, Prince's friend who became more violent after making her own wish with the Dreamstone. Upon realizing Prince is losing her powers as a result of her wish, Trevor eventually persuades her to renounce it. Reluctantly, she lets him go and does so before stopping Lord and Minerva.

==== Animation ====
- Steve Trevor appears in Wonder Woman (2009), voiced by Nathan Fillion. This version is a U.S. Air Force Colonel who goes by the call sign "Zipper".
- The Flashpoint incarnation of Steve Trevor appears in Justice League: The Flashpoint Paradox, voiced by James Patrick Stuart.
- Steve Trevor appears in films set in the DC Animated Movie Universe (DCAMU), voiced initially by George Newbern in Justice League: War and Justice League: Throne of Atlantis and by Jeffrey Donovan in Wonder Woman: Bloodlines. Similarly to his New 52 counterpart, this version is a government liaison to Wonder Woman, and later the Justice League.
- An alternate universe version of Steve Trevor appears in Justice League: Gods and Monsters, voiced by Tahmoh Penikett. This version is an informant and lover of Bekka / Wonder Woman.
- An alternate universe version of Steve Trevor appears in Justice Society: World War II, voiced by Chris Diamantopoulos. This version is a colonel and member of the Justice Society of America (JSA) who hails from Earth-2. While helping the JSA and the Flash of Earth-1 foil the Advisor and Aquaman's plans, Trevor is killed by the former.

=== Miscellaneous ===
- Steve Trevor appears in Wonder Woman '77.
- Steve Trevor appears in Smallville Season 11.
- The Gods and Monsters incarnation of Steve Trevor appears in the Justice League: Gods and Monsters Chronicles episode "Big", voiced again by Tahmoh Penikett.
- Steve Trevor appears in DC Super Hero Girls (2015) and its tie-in films, voiced by Josh Keaton. This version is a waiter at his father's Capes and Cowls Cafe.
- Steve Trevor appears in Injustice 2 Annual #1. This version is a Nazi agent who, after crash-landing on Themyscira, secretly killed an Amazon named Calliope before tricking Wonder Woman into leaving with him under the pretense of stopping Nazi Germany. Despite his love for Wonder Woman, he is unable to love a woman more than his country, leading to her killing him and taking on more ruthless ethics.
- Steve Trevor appears in DC Heroes United, voiced by Jalen Askins.
