= The Legend of Wonder Woman =

2016 webcomic published by DC Comics

Publication information
- Publisher: DC Comics
- Genre: Superhero
- Publication date: (Volume 1: Origins); December 13, 2016
- Main character(s): Wonder Woman

Creative team
- Writer(s): Renae De Liz
- Artist(s): Renae De Liz
- Inker(s): Ray Dillon
- Letterer(s): Ray Dillon
- Colorist(s): Ray Dillon

The Legend of Wonder Woman is a comic series starring Wonder Woman, published by DC Comics. The series was created by Renae De Liz, with colors, inks, and letters by her husband, Ray Dillon. It functions as a modern retelling of Wonder Woman's Golden Age origin, with heavy influence from the original comics by William Moulton Marston. The series was nominated for the Eisner Award for Best Digital/Webcomic.

== Publication history ==
The digital-first series began in November 2015 and consisted of 27 chapters released weekly. It was collected in nine single issues throughout 2016, then published in hardcover December 13 the same year. A proposed second volume was in the works until it was cancelled by DC.

An earlier series, published by DC in 1986, was also titled The Legend of Wonder Woman. The last pre-Crisis on Infinite Earths Wonder Woman story, it was a tribute to the Golden Age Wonder Woman that was written and illustrated by Trina Robbins. The four-issue limited series was published during the time between the first and second volumes of Wonder Woman.

== Plot ==
=== Volume One ===
As a child, Diana senses danger looming towards her island, Themyscira. She coerces the Captain of the Guard, Alcippe into training her in the arts of battle. As she grows older, Diana becomes a fearsome fighter, though she longs to find the answer to her ominous feelings. One day, she finds Air Force pilot Steve Trevor crash on the island. She keeps him a secret from the other Amazons as she tends to his wounds, though they eventually discover his presence. Diana wins the competition to return Steve to the United States, where she meets Etta Candy and the Holliday Girls.

Meanwhile, Ares and Hades send their champion, Thomas Byde (calling himself the Duke of Deception) to aid the Nazis during World War II. Diana disguises herself as a nurse to get onto the front lines, but is easily defeated by the Duke of Deception. She later loses her powers completely by turning away her patron gods, deciding to live a peaceful life with Steve and Etta.

Quickly after, Diana is summoned by duty to return to the battle, despite the loss of magic in her equipment. She manages to defeat the Duke of Deception with the aid of Pegasus, then regains her powers in time to defeat the deadly Titan.

=== Volume Two ===
A second and third volumes were planned for The Legend of Wonder Woman but were cancelled by DC Comics. Writer Renae De Liz later posted on her Twitter account her plans for future volumes had included various villains from Wonder Woman's lore, such as Cheetah, Blue Snowman, Giganta, and Circe.

== Characters ==
- Princess Diana/Wonder Woman
  The princess of the Amazons. As in the main DC Universe, Diana won the right to become Wonder Woman and return injured air force pilot Steve Trevor back to "man's world".
- Etta Candy
  A boisterous student at Holliday College, Etta immediately befriended Diana when she arrived at the United States. Etta continued to play a large role in the series, joining Diana in her adventures as her sidekick.
- Steve Trevor
  A young pilot who crash landed on Paradise Island. After being brought back to the United States by Diana, he continued to play a prominent role in Diana's life, eventually becoming her romantic interest.
- Duke of Deception
  The primary antagonist of the story. Once a mortal man named Thomas Byde, the Duke of Deception served as Ares's champion.
- Queen Hippolyta
  Queen of the Amazons and Diana's mother.
- Alcippe
  General of the Amazons and presumably Hippolyta's lover. She trained Diana in the ways of battle, and eventually revealed her former name to be Philippus.
- Priscilla Rich
  A wealthy socialite who has allied with the Nazi party.
- Antiope and Melanippe
  Sisters of Queen Hippolyta. Antiope served Ares while Melanippe was a priestess of Hades. Both plot against Queen Hippolyta presumably under the orders of their respective Gods.
- Pegasus
  A mythical creature that aided Diana in her journey.
- Holliday Girls
  A group of college students that help Diana on her adventure. The group consists of Etta, Glamora Treat, Lita Little, and Millie and Tillie Heyday.
- Lt. Lawrence Stone
  Steve's commanding officer and Etta's romantic interest.
- Perry White
  A young reporter that Diana questions about the Duke of Deception.
- Alfred Pennyworth
  A young child who the Holliday Girls recruit to help in their performance in the United Kingdom.
- Troia
  An amazon that was in Diana's class as a child.
- Jumpa
  Diana's kanga which is briefly seen on Themyscira.
- Pamela Smuthers
  Etta Candy's arch-rival.

== Follow up ==
Despite the cancellation of the second volume of The Legend of Wonder Woman, DC Comics published a follow-up story written by Renae De Liz set in the same universe in the Wonder Woman: 75th Anniversary Special. In the story, Wonder Woman confronts Baroness von Gunther and her subordinates Red Panzer and Mavis. After using the lasso of truth on the Baroness, she discovers that the Baroness's daughter, Gerta, had been kidnapped by the Nazi forces in order to force Baroness von Gunther's compliance. Wonder Woman saves the young girl and returns her to her mother, who vows that she has been set free.
