= Cathy Lee Crosby =

American actress, tennis player (born 1944)

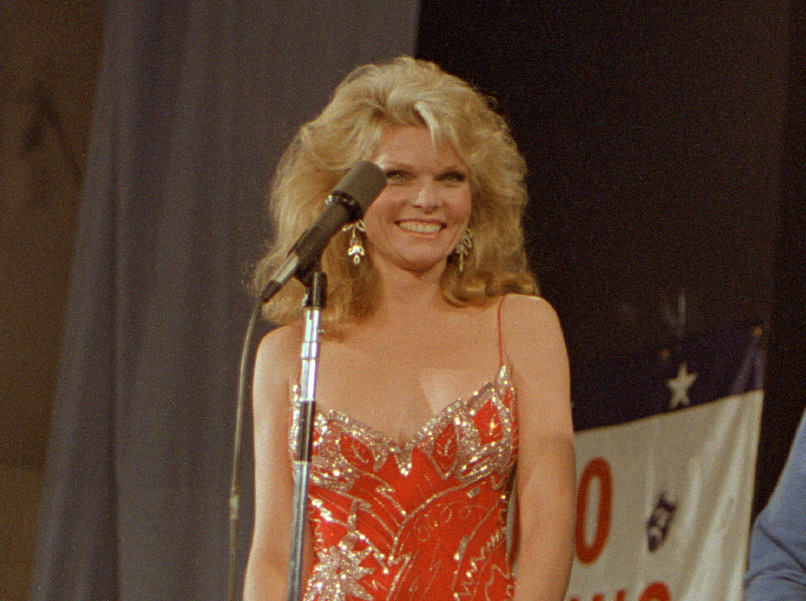
- Crosby in 1984
- Born: December 2, 1944 (age 81); Los Angeles, California, U.S.
- Education: University of Southern California
- Occupations: Tennis player; actress; entertainer
- Known for: That's Incredible!; Wonder Woman; The Dark
- Spouse: Alexander Ingle (m. 1966; div. 1968)
- Partner: Joe Theismann (~1981–1991)

Cathy Lee Crosby (born December 2, 1944) is an American actress and former professional tennis player. She achieved TV and film success in the 1980s and was a co-host of the television series That's Incredible!

== Early life ==
Born in Los Angeles on December 2, 1944, Crosby was the middle daughter of three. Her father, Louis Clayton Crosby, was a scriptwriter-songwriter (he was also the commercial spokesman for Dodge automobiles on The Lawrence Welk Show), and her mother, stage-named Linda Hayes (formerly Rachel Germano, aka Mrs. Dominic J. Germano, born Rachelle Fern Mendenhall), had, from 1940 through 1942, been a contract player for RKO. Her parents eventually separated, and her father relocated to Australia.

Crosby excelled at tennis as a youth, starting the game at age 12. She was ranked as high as #7 in singles in US junior tennis competition and #4 in doubles, which she often played with her elder sister, Linda Lou, as her partner.

Crosby graduated in 1968 from the University of Southern California with a degree in psychology, although she originally was pre-med.

== Career ==
Crosby was a professional tennis player who played at Wimbledon twice, quitting the sport professionally sometime between 1967 and 1970.

As an actress, Crosby's first TV appearance was as Susan in the episode "The Lay of the Land" in the first season of It Takes a Thief (1968). Her first movie role was a lead as Ann Chris in Michael Shurtleff's film version of his play Call Me by My Rightful Name (1972), opposite Don Murray and Otis Young. She played Jenny Hollister in the TV series Emergency! – Season 2, Episode 4 Virus (1972). The following year she played Kay Butler in the 20th Century Fox crime drama The Laughing Policeman (1973).

In 1970, Crosby was reportedly sued by Cathy Crosby, daughter of singer and bandleader Bob Crosby and niece to Bing Crosby, over the use of the name "Cathy Crosby".

In 1974, Crosby starred as the title character in the television film Wonder Woman, a year before Lynda Carter first portrayed the character that would lead to the Wonder Woman television series. In 1975, she guest starred as Helen of Troy in an episode of the scifi/horror series Kolchak: The Night Stalker. Crosby starred in the movie Trackdown (1976), the TV movie Keefer (1978), and in Coach (1978), in which she played the coach of a high school basketball team who falls for one of her players. Crosby also played Libby Hall in the seventeenth episode of the second season of the romantic comedy-drama television series The Love Boat (1979).

Crosby starred in the horror movie The Dark (1979), the 1982 TV miniseries World War III, and appeared in the TV movie Intimate Strangers (1986). She also played herself in cameo roles in The Last Horror Film (1982) and Robert Altman's 1992 film The Player.

From 1980 to 1984, Crosby co-hosted the ABC series, That's Incredible!, which remains in world-wide syndication. In 1986, alongside fellow celebrity "anchors" Joan Rivers, Tommy Lasorda, Ray Charles, Robert Conrad, and Ricky Schroder (all of whome—excepting Charles—are assigned similarly out-of-character tasks), Crosby and actress Susan Saint James provided color commentary for the nationally televised special of WWF's WrestleMania 2.

Crosby starred as Judith Main in the 1994 TV miniseries North and South: Book III. The same year she appeared in the Lifetime movie Untamed Love (1994), based on Torey Hayden's One Child, and later starred in the film Ablaze (2001).

== Personal life ==
Crosby was married at age 21 to Alexander Wilfred Ingle on July 30, 1966; they divorced in 1968. She dated actor Richard Roundtree during the mid 1970s and also Michael Biehn, who co-starred with her in the film Coach (1978).

She was in a relationship with football star Joe Theismann throughout the early 1980s. Their romantic relationship had ended by late 1990. He sued her in December, after which she countersued in January 1991 for $4.5 million because he "abandoned his promise to financially support her." They settled out of court in mid-year.

She was briefly a follower of Scientology.
