= Wonder Woman (TV series) =

1975 US superhero television series

- First season title card
- Genre: Superhero
- Based on: Wonder Woman by: William Moulton Marston and H. G. Peter
- Developed by: Stanley Ralph Ross
- Starring: Lynda Carter; Lyle Waggoner; Beatrice Colen; Richard Eastham; Debra Winger; Norman Burton; Saundra Sharp
- Theme music composer: Charles Fox (music); Norman Gimbel (lyrics)
- Country of origin: United States
- Original language: English
- No. of seasons: 3
- No. of episodes: 59 + movie pilot (list of episodes)

Production
- Executive producers: Douglas S. Cramer; Wilford Lloyd Baumes
- Producers: Charles B. Fitzsimons; Mark Rodgers
- Running time: 42–51 minutes
- Production companies: The Douglas S. Cramer Co.; Bruce Lansbury Productions, Ltd.; Warner Bros. Television; DC Comics

Original release
- Network: ABC
- Release: November 7, 1975 – February 16, 1977
- Network: CBS
- Release: September 22, 1977 – September 11, 1979

Wonder Woman, known for seasons 2 and 3 as The New Adventures of Wonder Woman, is an American superhero television series based on the DC Comics comic book superhero of the same name. It stars Lynda Carter as Wonder Woman / Diana Prince and Lyle Waggoner as Steve Trevor Sr. and Jr., and aired for three seasons, from 1975 to 1979. The show's first season aired on ABC and is set in the 1940s, during World War II. The second and third seasons aired on CBS and are set in the then-current day late 1970s, with the title changed to The New Adventures of Wonder Woman.

== Plot ==
In 1942, during World War II, American pilot Major Steve Trevor (Waggoner) bails out during an air battle over the Bermuda Triangle, location of Paradise Island. The island is home to the Amazons: beautiful, ageless women with great strength, agility, and intelligence. Amazon princess Diana (Carter) rescues the handsome unconscious Trevor and helps nurse him back to health.

Diana's mother, the Amazon queen (Cloris Leachman; succeeded by Carolyn Jones and Beatrice Straight in later episodes), decrees that Olympic-style games shall be held to select one Amazon to return Trevor back to America. But she forbids her own daughter Diana, the princess, to participate. Diana states that since she is not allowed to participate, she does not want to be present for the games and will take a retreat to the other side of the island. The games are held with participants wearing masks and numbers, shown as Roman numerals in triangles on white sleeveless short tunic-dresses.

Among the contestants is a masked blonde Amazon. During the events, the blonde Amazon shows exceptional skills and she ties for first with another Amazon. To break the deadlock, the "bullets and bracelets" event is decided as the tiebreaker, wherein each of the women takes turns shooting at the other; the one being shot at must deflect the bullets with her bulletproof bracelets. The blonde woman wins the event, superficially injuring her opponent's arm. When she is pronounced the winner, she removes her mask and wig and reveals that she is Diana. Her mother, though initially shocked, relents and allows her to go to America.

Diana's uniform as Wonder Woman, designed by Queen Hippolyta, features emblems of America, the land to which she will be returning Steve Trevor. A golden belt will be the source of her strength and power while away from Paradise Island. She has her bullet-deflecting bracelets and also receives a golden lasso which is unbreakable and forces people to obey and tell the truth when bound with it. As shown later in flashback, Hippolyta also teaches Diana how to magically transform her clothes into the uniform.

Diana, as Wonder Woman, flies to Washington, D.C. in an invisible plane. After dropping Trevor off at a hospital, the heroine stumbles upon a bank robbery, which she stops. A theatrical agent who sees her in action offers to help make her bullets and bracelets act a stage attraction. Diana is hesitant, but needing money in this new society, she agrees.

Meanwhile, Trevor's civilian secretary Marcia (Stella Stevens) is a double agent for the Nazi Fifth Columnists. She seeks to aid top spies in killing Trevor and opposing this new threat, Wonder Woman. Her first attempt is arranging for an accomplice to fire a machine gun at Wonder Woman during her stage act. Later, as spy activities increase, Trevor leaves the hospital but gets in a fight and is captured, prompting his "nurse" Diana to come to his rescue. Wonder Woman defeats Marcia in an extended fight sequence in the War Department. Having defeated Marcia, Wonder Woman thwarts a Nazi pilot who had plans to bomb the Brooklyn Navy Yard by using her invisible plane, and she rescues Trevor. With Marcia and the spy ring defeated, the film closes as Trevor and Brigadier General Blankenship talk about Trevor's new secretary whom Blankenship selected not only for her outstanding clerical test scores, but her decidedly plain appearance in contrast to Marcia: the bespectacled Yeoman First Class Diana Prince USNR(WR), Wonder Woman in disguise.

== Cast and characters ==
=== Main ===
- Lynda Carter as Diana Prince / Wonder Woman: This version of the character is exclusive to the continuity of the TV series Wonder Woman and is an adaptation of Diana Prince/Wonder Woman. The original character was created by William Moulton Marston and Harry G. Peter and first appeared in All-Star Comics #8.
- Lyle Waggoner as Steve Trevor and Steve Trevor Jr.: The original character was created by William Moulton Marston and Harry G. Peter and first appeared in All-Star Comics #8. The details surrounding the death of Steve Trevor Sr. remain largely unknown, but is known that Steve died some time prior to 1977. His son Steve Trevor Jr. would also work with Diana at the Inter-Agency Defense Command (IADC) center.
- Beatrice Colen as Etta Candy (season 1): General Phil Blankenship's secretary. She is there to provide comic relief. The original character was created by William Moulton Marston and Harry G. Peter and first appeared in Sensation Comics #2.
- Richard Eastham as General Philip Blankenship (season 1): He works for the War Department during the early years of World War II. In 1942, he worked with his subordinate Colonel Steve Trevor in an ongoing effort to prevent Nazi cells from infiltrating the United States and threatening the nation's security. Blankenship also kept in close contact with Steve's colleagues Diana Prince and Etta Candy. Blankenship never knew that Yeoman Prince was also Wonder Woman. John Randolph portrayed General Phil Blankenship in "The New Original Wonder Woman".
- Norman Burton as Joe Atkinson (season 2): Inter-Agency Defense Command's supervisor.
- Saundra Sharp as Eve Welch (season 2): An agent for the Inter-Agency Defense Command.

=== Recurring characters ===
- Debra Winger as Drusilla / Wonder Girl: Born as the second daughter of Hippolyta, Queen of the Amazons, Drusilla grew up on Paradise Island along with her older sister, Princess Diana. After her sister left the island, she quickly became the finest archer and rider of the Amazons. When Hippolyta felt it was time for her elder daughter to return to the island, Drusilla was sent to America to urge her return. Reluctant to leave, Diana decided to show her younger sister of the need for Wonder Woman in the outside world. As part of this she convinced Drusilla to pose as Diana Prince's teenage sister for a few days. During this time she accompanied General Blankenship on a car trip. They were attacked by Nazi spies who abducted the general and left her behind. Unable to contact her sister, she decided to go after the spies herself and transformed into Wonder Girl. Drusilla was actually based on a one-time character from the comics of the same name back in 1969.
- Cloris Leachman, Carolyn Jones and Beatrice Straight as Hippolyta, Queen of the Amazons and Diana and Drusilla's mother.

== Production ==
In March 1974, ABC aired the TV film Wonder Woman, produced by Warner Bros. It was directed by Vincent McEveety and starred Cathy Lee Crosby and was intended as a pilot for a potential series. The Wonder Woman of the film had little resemblance to the traditional character in either costume or abilities, although she did resemble the comic book character's 1968–73 "I Ching" period. The film's ratings were described as "respectable but not exactly wondrous" and ABC did not pick up the pilot.

Warner Bros. and ABC did not give up on the idea, and instead developed another TV pilot, The New Original Wonder Woman, which aired in November 1975. This film was directed by Leonard Horn and starred Lynda Carter, and its Wonder Woman more closely matched the original character created by William Moulton Marston, down to the World War II setting (Crosby would later claim that she was offered the chance to reprise the role in that film). This second film was more successful and immediately led to production of the series Wonder Woman.

The first two regular episodes of the new series aired in April 1976; both were directed by Barry Crane. After that, the series took a hiatus, and returned in October, with another 11 episodes that were aired on a more-or-less weekly basis.

=== Theme song ===
The theme song, written by composer Charles Fox and lyricist Norman Gimbel, was performed by John Bahler of The Ron Hicklin Singers. Marti McCall, Carolyn Willis of the R&B group Honey Cone, and Julia Waters of the R&B group The Waters, recorded background vocals.

=== Pilot ===
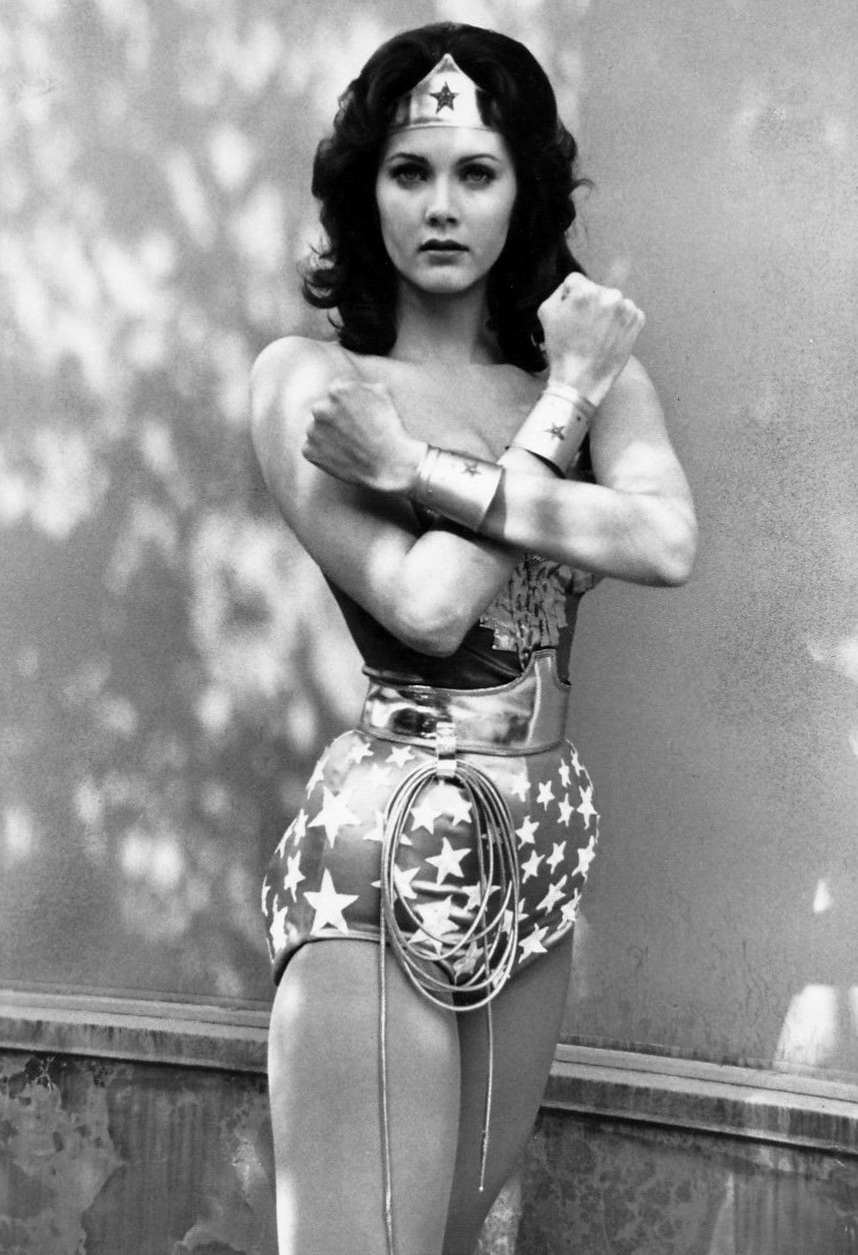
Lynda Carter as Wonder Woman

Despite the muted ratings of the earlier Cathy Lee Crosby television pilot, ABC still felt a Wonder Woman series had potential, and within a year another pilot was in production. Keen to make a distinction from the last pilot, producers gave the pilot the rather paradoxical title The New Original Wonder Woman. Scripting duties were given to Stanley Ralph Ross, who was instructed to be more faithful to the comic book and to create a subtle "high comedy". Ross set the pilot in World War II, the era in which the original comic book began.

After an intense talent search that included Joanna Cassidy and future Charlie's Angels star Jaclyn Smith, twenty-three-year-old Lynda Carter was chosen for the lead role. She had had a handful of minor acting roles and had been the 1972 Miss World USA and a Bob Hope USO cast member. For the role of Steve Trevor, the producers chose Lyle Waggoner, despite his dark brown, almost-black, hair not matching the comic's blond Trevor. Waggoner at the time was better known as a comedic actor after several years co-starring in The Carol Burnett Show. He was also known to Ross as having been one of the leading candidates to play Batman a decade earlier, eventually losing to Adam West. Waggoner was also considered a sex symbol, having done a semi-nude pictorial in the first issue of Playgirl.

Although the pilot followed the original comic book closely, in particular the aspect of Wonder Woman joining the military under the name Diana Prince, a number of elements were dropped. The comic book Diana obtains the credentials of a look-alike nurse. Although the pilot shows Diana briefly as a nurse at one point, Diana instead takes on the identity of a Navy Yeoman Petty Officer First Class (abbreviated YN1 in this article).

One change, which was later to become synonymous with the show, was the transformation of Diana Prince into Wonder Woman by spinning. During the filming of the pilot, producers were trying to figure out a way to show how Diana Prince became Wonder Woman, when Carter suggested that she do a spin.

Unlike the earlier pilot, the comic-book origins of the character were emphasized by the retention of the character's traditional uniform (the design of which was interpreted and executed by Donald Lee Feld, credited as "Donfeld") with the original setting and through the use of comic book elements. The series' title sequence was animated in the form of a series of comic book panels featuring Wonder Woman performing a variety of heroic feats. Within the show, location and exposition were handled through comic book-style text panels. Transitions between scenes and commercial breaks were marked by animated starburst sequences.

=== Season 1 ===
The pilot film aired on November 7, 1975, was a ratings success, and ABC quickly authorized the production of two one-hour specials which aired in April 1976. These three productions would later be considered part of the show's first season. The episodes scored strong ratings, and ABC ordered an additional 11 episodes for the new 1976–77 TV season. The network began airing the episodes every few weeks apart at the beginning of the TV season in September. After mid-December, episodes aired on a weekly basis until mid-February 1977. This season was a ratings success it ranked at number 45 in the ratings and received positive reviews.

A few cast changes were made between the specials and the series. Former Happy Days recurring actress Beatrice Colen joined the cast as Corporal Etta Candy WAAC, General Blankenship's secretary, thereby providing YN1 Prince with a subordinate. Three episodes featured Debra Winger as Diana's younger sister, Drusilla, a.k.a. Wonder Girl, in one of her earliest acting roles.

One of the most memorable aspects of the show that was developed during the first season was the transformation sequence that changed Diana Prince into her superheroine alter ego. The sequence in the original specials employed a slow fade between two synchronized shots, both filmed with an overcranked camera to create a slow motion effect. A twirling Diana Prince's hair would fall loose as the shot transitioned to a twirling Wonder Woman holding her Diana clothes, which she would stow nearby in a closet or locker. How she changes back to Diana is never shown. To ensure both segments transitioned smoothly the camera was locked off (secured in place) while Carter's clothing, make-up, and hair was altered between identities, a process Carter said on a DVD commentary typically took about 45 minutes. The spinning transformation was later incorporated into the comics and into animated appearances such as Justice League Unlimited. At the time of the series in which Carter starred, the transformation was depicted in the comics by way of Diana spinning her magic lasso around her body, with the lasso changing her clothes, a move that was incorporated in 1973. The original character changed much the same as Superman, by simply changing at super-human speed, her costume under her clothing, and her boots and tiara in her handbag or desk drawer.

An explosion overlay was introduced after the third episode to mask the cut point between the Diana and Wonder Woman clips, meaning they no longer needed to be perfectly aligned. This allowed them to be shot without a locked off camera at more convenient points in the production schedule, when Carter was already in the appropriate costume. The slow motion aspect of the sequence was dropped, and Wonder Woman was no longer left holding her Diana Prince clothes. A thunderclap sound effect accompanied the explosion effect; both the explosion flash and its sound are apparently non-diegetic (only heard by the audience, not within the narrative world), as demonstrated by Diana changing unnoticed in a dormitory of sleeping women, in adjoining office spaces, etc. Generally, the audience never sees Wonder Woman change back to Diana Prince, although there is one occasion when it is almost shown: Wonder Woman reveals her secret identity to her little sister Drusilla by slowly turning on the spot, but the actual moment of transformation is masked by a cut-away reaction shot of Drusilla (no thunderclap was heard).

During season one, Wonder Woman has the ability to impersonate anyone's voice, which came in handy over the telephone. She did not use this ability during seasons two and three.

The series began at a time when violence on television was under intense scrutiny. As a result, Wonder Woman was less frequently seen punching or kicking people the way she did in the early episodes. She would usually be shown pushing and throwing enemies or using creativity to get them to somehow knock themselves out (such as jumping high into the air to cause pursuers to collide). Despite the wartime setting, she almost never resorted to deadly force. The only exception occurs in the pilot episode when she sinks a German U-boat by crashing an airplane into it, presumably killing everyone aboard. Wonder Woman herself was occasionally overpowered by chloroform and poison gas, but she always came back in the second half of the show to save the day. In some episodes, her enemies learn the secret of her superhuman strength – her magic belt which gave her strength while she was away from Paradise Island – and temporarily steal it, leaving her with average human strength. Her indestructible lasso and bracelets were stolen or taken away in one episode (leaving her defenseless against gunfire), but Wonder Woman recovered them by the end of the episode. In the comics, Wonder Woman has her super strength even when away from Paradise Island and does not need a magic belt – she would lose her super strength only if her bracelets were fused or chained together by a man.

Season 2 establishes that Wonder Woman remained active from 1942 to 1945 and was honored by Franklin D. Roosevelt for her work against Axis attacks.

=== Season 2 ===
Despite good ratings for the series, ABC stalled on picking up the show for a second season. This was because Wonder Woman was a period piece, being set in the 1940s, which made the set, clothing, automobiles, etc. more expensive to produce. While ABC had not yet committed, the show's production company Warner Bros. listened to an offer from rival network CBS. While ABC continued to make up its mind, CBS agreed to pick up the series on condition that the setting be changed from World War II (the 1940s) to the modern day (the 1970s). Changing the title to The New Adventures of Wonder Woman, the series was moved away from international intrigue to a more conventional police/detective action-type show that was more common in the 1970s.

Princess Diana, aging slowly because of her Amazon nature, returns from Paradise Island after a 35-year absence (looking virtually the same) to become an agent with the Inter-Agency Defense Command (IADC), a CIA / FBI-type organization fighting crime, espionage, and the occasional alien invasion.

Lynda Carter was the only cast member whose character continued into the second and third seasons (aside from a brief cameo appearance of Major Trevor (Lyle Waggoner) in Diana's flashback when she first encountered his son and a framed photograph of him seen on the younger Trevor's office credenza in season 3). The original Steve Trevor was revealed to have risen to the rank of major general and died in the 35-year interim between the first and second seasons, although Lyle Waggoner remained with the series, portraying Trevor's son, Steve Jr.

As a child, Steve Jr. had heard his late father's stories of adventures with Wonder Woman during World War II. It is essentially confirmed in the second season première that his father never introduced him to Wonder Woman and that he had never even seen her photographed. It is similarly implied that he and YN1 Diana Prince were unaware of each other. Diana is taken aback by the younger Steve's existence, implying that his father had never spoken of the boy to either Wonder Woman or YN1 Prince. This was particularly striking when she spoke to Steve Jr. about knowing his father well, from the j-shaped burn scar on his right shoulder, to the 20mm shell casing that he used as a paperweight.

Despite (or perhaps because) Wonder Woman had fallen in love with the first Steve Trevor, the producers chose to drop any suggestion that Steve Jr. and Wonder Woman were anything more than good friends. Indeed, when an impostor posing as Steve Jr. attempted to seduce Diana, she made it quite clear that she had no sexual interest in him. Executive producer Douglas S. Cramer noted the difficulties in maintaining long-term romantic tension between leads, because the resolution of that romantic tension often results in the cancellation of the series.

Since Waggoner returned in a technically new role, Diana's mother Hippolyta was the only other first season character to be seen or mentioned, though she was played by a new actress, Beatrice Straight, succeeding Carolyn Jones and Cloris Leachman in the role. The post-war fates of General Phil Blankenship, Etta Candy, and Drusilla / Wonder Girl were never revealed.

Diana, Steve and Joe Atkinson (Norman Burton), a weathered IADC agent, received their orders from a "Charlie's Angels-like" character who is heard but never seen. Diana and Steve would go out and work the field while Joe assisted from the office. The Atkinson character was dropped after the ninth episode of this season, and Steve was given a promotion, becoming IADC Director, and Diana's boss, in the process. This promotion for Steve Trevor meant that Lyle Waggoner was seen less in subsequent episodes for the remainder of the series' run. In this season, the computer IRAC (Information Retrieval Associative Computer), more informally known as "Ira", was introduced: its first appearance is in season 2, episode 1, where Diana introduces her Diana Prince identity into its records, over IRAC's protests. Ira was the IADC's super-intelligent computer, who deduces that Diana Prince is really Wonder Woman, although he never shares this information with anyone, except Diana herself. Saundra Sharp joined the cast as Eve, Steve's assistant (the job held by Diana at the start of the season). Towards the end of the season, in the episode "IRAC is Missing", a small mobile robot called Rover was added for comic relief. An offshoot of IRAC who performs duties such as delivering coffee and sorting mail, Rover speaks with a high-pitched voice, occasionally makes "Beep Beep" sounds and, like IRAC, is aware that Wonder Woman's secret identity is Diana Prince.

A more subtle change concerned Wonder Woman's intonation. In the first season, a mild version of the Mid-Atlantic accent, synonymous with the Golden Age of Hollywood, was used. For the second (and third) season, Wonder Woman's intonation sounded Southwest American, reflecting the region where Lynda Carter herself was born and raised (Phoenix, Arizona). Whether this change was done for the purpose of modernizing the series is unknown.

The theme song was re-written to remove references to the Axis, reflecting the series' new present-day setting, and the action depicted in the opening's animated comic book panels was similarly updated. Beginning with the episode "The Man Who Made Volcanoes", the opening title sequence was changed again to an instrumental and more traditional "action scenes" opening. The animated stars used before and after commercial breaks were dropped.

The producers of Wonder Woman generally maintained her no-kill policy, although there were exceptions: in the episode "Anschluss '77", she is forced to reverse the cloning procedure of a clone of Adolf Hitler (Barry Dennen) that was created by Nazi war criminals led by Fritz Gerlich (Mel Ferrer) in South America. Another episode made reference to a villain who was believed drowned following a previous unseen encounter with Diana/Wonder Woman.

Unlike in the first season, Wonder Woman's sources of power (magic belt, bracelets, golden lasso) were never removed from her and stolen by villains during the two years the series was set in the 1970s.

Other changes in season two included a slight redesign (again by Donald Lee Feld, still credited as "Donfeld") of Wonder Woman's uniform. The bustier was more flexible, featured less gold metal in the eagle wings in favor of red cloth background, and was cut lower to highlight Carter's décolletage and cleavage. The star-spangled bottoms were cut higher in the thighs, with the number of stars reduced, stopping below her hips, and rearranged in a more symmetrical starburst pattern. The bracelets changed from dull silver-grey to bright gold and were noticeably smaller and thinner. Her tiara, appearing unchanged when on Wonder Woman's head, would flatten to become a boomerang, and its ruby star functioned as a communications link to Paradise Island and her mother the queen.

Feld also introduced new variants on Wonder Woman's uniform beginning in season two. She still wore the red-white-and-blue cape for special events or appearances from the first season, but without the skirt (this variant could be described as Wonder Woman's "full-dress uniform"). A diving uniform was introduced—this consisted of a navy-blue Lycra body suit with matching gloves, gold bracelets, flat boots, and a flexible tiara; this was featured whenever aquatic activity was required. The same uniform, with low-heeled boots and a gold helmet, was used to ride motorcycles. At first, Wonder Woman would switch to these newer uniforms by performing an extended spin in which she first changed from her Diana Prince clothes to Wonder Woman's standard uniform, then continued to spin until a second light explosion occurred and she would appear in one of the newer variants. This extended spin device was later dropped for expediency and Diana was then able to change into any of Wonder Woman's uniforms in a single change.

Wonder Woman's invisible plane appeared a couple of times in season two, and not at all in season three. The plane's shape was updated with the change in temporal setting, losing the rounded fuselage and modestly curved wings evocative of a World War II-era pursuit-fighter, in favor of a dart-like, delta winged jet.

The show ranked 71 in the ratings, and received positive reviews.

=== Season 3 ===
With the beginning of the third season, further changes were made to target the show at a teenage audience. The title theme was re-recorded again to give it a disco beat, the use of the robot 'Rover' was increased for comic effect, and episodes began to revolve around topical subjects like skateboarding, roller coasters and the environment (Feld also gave Wonder Woman a "skate-boarder's" uniform, which was also capable of use for training in any "extreme sport" in which she participated). Teenagers or young adults were commonly used as main characters in the plot lines. Eve disappeared from the cast although she is mentioned once or twice. Episodes during this season showed Diana on assignments by herself far more often (particularly outside of Washington DC), and Steve Trevor had become Diana's boss and was seen less.

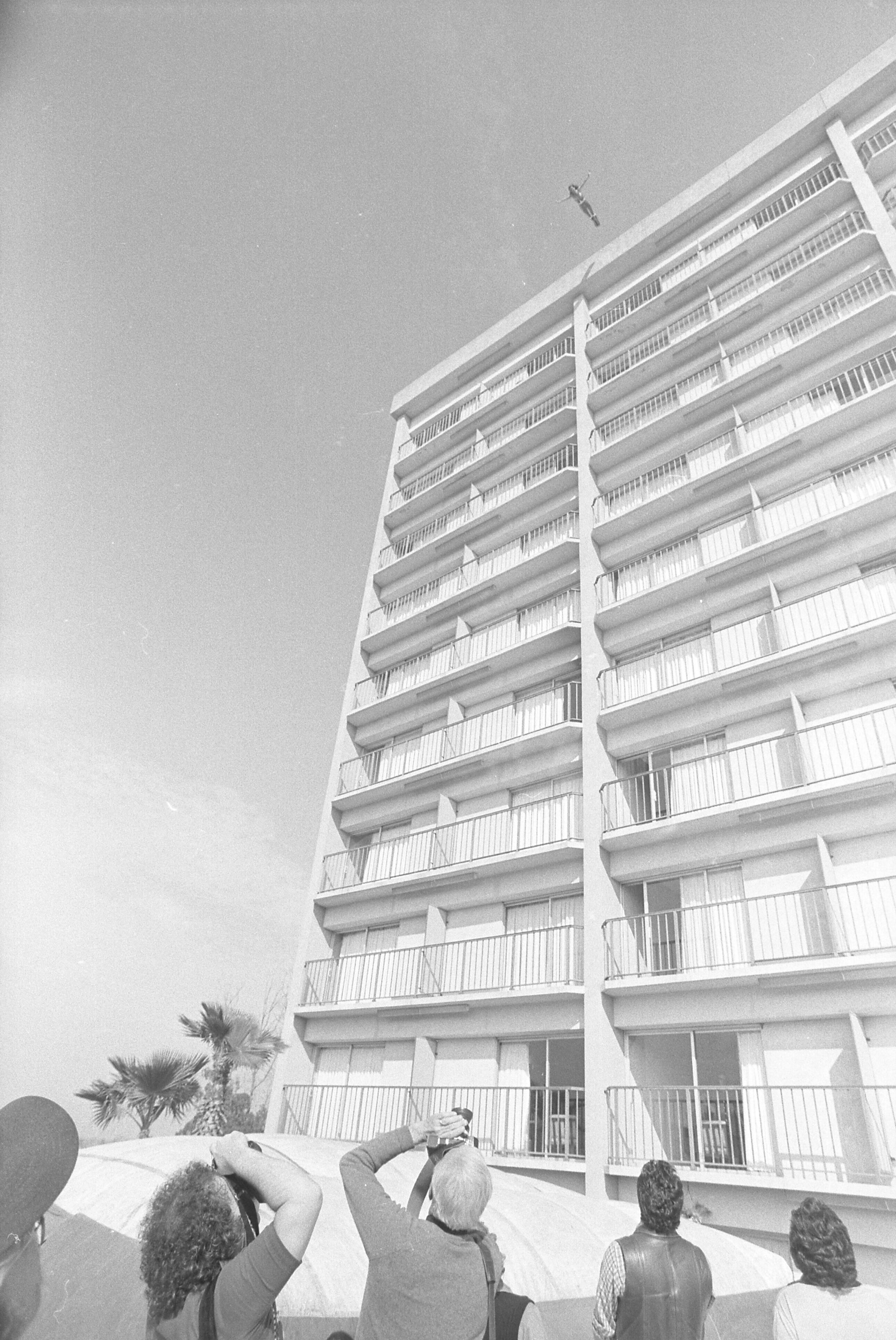
A stunt for the show being performed by Wonder Woman stunt-double, Kitty O'Neil.

Wonder Woman was also allowed to become a bit more physical in the third season and could now be seen throwing the occasional punch or kick. The writers also came up with several unusual ways for Diana to execute her spinning transformation, the most notable instances occurring in the episode "Stolen Faces" in which Diana makes the change while falling off a tall building, and the season two episode "The Pied Piper" in which she changes while strapped into a spinning chair.

Diana also exhibited other powers, particularly in the episode "The Deadly Dolphin", in which she is shown communicating telepathically with animals (reminiscent of the "mental radio" from the comics, which was never shown on the series) and generating bursts of an unknown form of energy to scare away a killer shark.

In the final episode produced, the writers attempted a soft reboot by having Diana reassigned to the Los Angeles bureau of IADC with a new supporting cast. Though done in anticipation of a fourth season, the revamp was seen only in one episode ("The Man Who Could Not Die"), which set up an assortment of new supporting characters. These included Dale Hawthorn, Diana's new IADC boss, Bret Cassiday (Bob Seagren), a genetically enhanced man who was indestructible (the titular character of the episode), as well as a streetwise youngster named T. Burton Phipps III who inexplicably is allowed to hang out at the IADC. Also added to the cast was a chimpanzee who, like Bret, is also indestructible. This episode was actually the last to be produced and would have ended the third season, but was shown out of sequence with the two-part episode "The Phantom of the Roller Coaster". These three episodes aired by themselves in August–September 1979, months after the broadcast of the rest of season three, creating a mini-season, though they remain grouped as part of season three.

CBS ultimately decided to move The Incredible Hulk up to the Friday 8:00-hour from 9:00 to introduce the new series The Dukes of Hazzard, but no further episodes of Wonder Woman were produced due to the lack of new cast members for a fourth season and low ratings. The show ranked at number 59 in the ratings this season, After her first musical television special, Carter gave up the role to focus more on her musical career.

== Release ==
=== Reruns ===
Reruns of Wonder Woman aired in syndication during the 1980s. It also aired on FX and Sci-Fi Channel in the 1990s and early 2000s.

The show aired Saturday evenings on the "classic TV" network MeTV from December 28, 2013, to February 1, 2020, as part of its "Super Sci-Fi" Saturday Night science fiction block. It ran as part of Heroes & Icons' "Action Sunday!" block from February 9 to June 28, 2020. Reruns of this series returned to H&I's weekend schedule on January 2, 2021.

WarnerMedia launched all 60 episodes on their HBO Max streaming platform on December 23, 2020, close to Carter's cameo appearance in the DC Extended Universe (DCEU) film Wonder Woman 1984, which was set for release two days later. It was removed in December 2024.

In the United Kingdom, the series was originally shown on BBC 1 (which started directly with Season Two) between 1978 and 1980, and the channel also screened reruns of the series in the mid-1980s. The series has since been rerun on other channels. In 2006, Sky Living broadcast the show every weekend as part of its "Hangover TV" strand. In 2015, the series was shown on The Horror Channel.

=== Nielsen ratings ===
Ratings table
Season	TV season	Rank	Rating	Households (in millions)
1	1976–77	45	18.0	12.8
2	1977–78	71	16.4	11.9
3	1978–79	59	16.5	12.3

=== Home media ===
Columbia House with Warner Home Video released the series on VHS videotapes through their Wonder Woman: The Collector's Edition series from the late 1990s to the early 2000s, which was only available through mail order subscriptions. Each volume contained two episodes. The Season Two episodes "The Pied Piper" and "Flight to Oblivion", however, were not included on the VHS releases.

Warner Home Video has released all three seasons of Wonder Woman on DVD in various regions, both separately and in a collected edition.

DVD name	Eps.	Release date	Details
The Complete 1st Season	13	June 29, 2004	All 13 episodes (including the pilot) with commentary by Lynda Carter and executive producer Douglas S. Cramer; new documentary retrospective
The Complete 2nd Season	22	March 1, 2005	22 episodes plus a feature-length season premiere; Bonus documentary: "Revolutionizing a Classic: From Comic Book to Television"
The Complete 3rd Season	24	June 7, 2005	Audio commentary by Carter on "My Teenage Idol is Missing"; featurette: "Wonder Woman: The Ultimate Feminist Icon"; The initial Region 1 release included a bonus DVD containing the first episode of the Captain Marvel television series Shazam!, "The Joy Riders"
The Complete Collection	60	November 6, 2007	Pilot with commentary by Lynda Carter and executive producer Douglas S. Cramer; new documentary retrospective; Bonus documentary: "Revolutionizing a Classic: From Comic Book to Television"; Audio commentary by Carter on "My Teenage Idol is Missing"; featurette: "Wonder Woman: The Ultimate Feminist Icon"

The pilot episode is included as a bonus feature on the Blu-ray release of Justice League: Crisis on Two Earths.

The complete series has been remastered in high definition and reframed for a 16:9 widescreen format. This version is available for purchase on iTunes and airs on Heroes & Icons.

Warner Bros. released the complete series on Blu-ray on July 28, 2020.

== Legacy ==
This portrayal of the character strongly influenced the Wonder Woman comics. Most notably, the ballerina-style spinning transformation, which was Carter's idea, was incorporated into the comics. The spin has also been used in the animated television programs Super Friends and Justice League Unlimited, etc.

The 2018 journal article "Casting a Wider Lasso: An Analysis of the Cultural Dismissal of Wonder Woman Through Her 1975–1979 Television Series" argued that the show strongly adapted Wonder Woman's ideals but "was suppressed, undone, and discredited" by American culture as part of a larger legacy suppressing the character.

Visiting the Wonder Woman universe and having Lynda Carter reprising her role again was discussed by showrunner Marc Guggenheim with Warner Bros. and DC Studios during development of the Arrowverse crossover event "Crisis on Infinite Earths" (2019–2020), but concluded that it would not happen. After the first screening of the DC Extended Universe (DCEU) film The Flash (2023) to the attendees of the Cinemacon 2023, director Andy Muschietti and producer Barbara Muschietti revealed that a cameo appearance of Carter's Wonder Woman was considered for the film, but was left in the "cutting floor room" due to not fitting in the story.

== Episodes ==
Season	Episodes	Originally released		
Season	Episodes	First released	Last released	Network
Television film pilot		November 7, 1975		ABC
1	13	April 21, 1976	February 16, 1977	ABC
2	22	September 16, 1977	April 21, 1978	CBS
3	24	September 22, 1978	September 11, 1979	CBS

== In other media ==
=== Merchandising ===
Mego Corporation released a line of dolls in 1977 to correspond with the TV series in the fall. The boxes originally featured Lynda Carter as Wonder Woman on the front flap, but in 1978, her image on the box was dropped and the line was revamped with only the Wonder Woman doll being featured and revised.

The Mego dolls included Wonder Woman, Diana Prince, Queen Hippolyta, Nubia, and Steve Trevor. The line also included separate fashion outfits for Diana Prince that were released in Canada. Various playsets were also created but were not released for sale.

DC Direct (which creates merchandise for DC Comics) released a Wonder Woman statue in 2007 which is based upon the image created by Lynda Carter.

In 2015, Hallmark released a Wonder Woman Christmas ornament bearing the likeness of Lynda Carter that also plays the intro to the television theme song.

Mattel produced a 6-inch action figure of Carter's Wonder Woman as part of their DC Multiverse Signature Collection.

=== Wonder Woman '77 comic ===
DC published ongoing comic book series set in the Lynda Carter TV series continuity. The comic was written by Marc Andreyko. It was first published as digital chapters on DC Comics' website. Wonder Woman '77 Special #1 was published in May 2015. A second Wonder Woman '77 Special collecting further digital first chapters was published in September. A third special was published in April 2016. Wonder Woman teams up with Jaime Sommers in the crossover title Wonder Woman '77 Meets the Bionic Woman. Wonder Woman teams up with Batman in the crossover team up Batman '66 Meets Wonder Woman '77 writing by both Andreyko and Jeff Parker.
