= Beatrice Colen =

American actress (1948–1999)

- Born: January 10, 1948; New York City, U.S.
- Died: November 18, 1999 (aged 51); Los Angeles, California, U.S.
- Occupation: Actress
- Years active: 1974–1997
- Spouse: Patrick Cronin (m. 1977)
- Children: 2
- Relatives: George S. Kaufman (grandfather)

Beatrice Colen (January 10, 1948 – November 18, 1999) was an American television and film actress. She may be best known for her television roles as roller-skating carhop Marsha Simms on Happy Days and as Etta Candy on the first season of Wonder Woman.

== Early life ==
Colen was born to Anne and Bruce D. Colen in New York City, New York. Both of her parents were of German Jewish descent. She was the granddaughter of playwright George S. Kaufman.

== Career ==
Starting in the 1970s, Colen landed roles early in her career in both film and television. On Happy Days, she starred as carhop Marsha Simms in seasons 1-3 and 5.

She was the first actress to portray Etta Candy in the live action adaptation of the DC comic book series Wonder Woman. After the pilot, she appeared only during the series' first season (1976–1977), which were set during World War II. When the series was retooled and reset in modern times, the character was dropped.

Colen acted in such television films as Schoolboy Father (1980), Brave New World, and in feature films such as Lifeguard, High Anxiety, American Pop, and Who's that Girl.

She guest-starred on a number of TV shows such as The Odd Couple, All in the Family, The Love Boat, Kolchak: The Night Stalker (1974, premiere episode: "The Ripper"), Barney Miller (1981, episode: "The Rainmaker" and the 1975 episode: “Grand Hotel”), The Wonder Years, Baywatch, and It's A Living.

Her final television appearance before retiring was in a 1997 episode of Nickelodeon's The Secret World of Alex Mack.

== Personal life and death ==
Colen was married to Patrick Cronin on October 23, 1977, and together they had two sons, James (born c. 1982) and Charlie (born c. 1983).

She died of lung cancer, which metastisized to a brain tumour years later, on November 18, 1999, in Los Angeles, California, at the Cedars-Sinai Medical Center. Colen died on the opening night of Brentwood High School's production of The Man Who Came to Dinner, which was written by her grandfather, Pulitzer Prize-winning playwright George S. Kaufman, and which starred her son, James, in the title role of Sheridan Whiteside; James honoured her wish that he perform that night. She was cremated at Neptune Society in Sherman Oaks, Los Angeles, California. Her memorial service was held at Saint James Episcopal Church in Los Angeles 10 days later.

== Filmography ==
Film and television
Year	Title	Role	Notes
1973	Road Movie		
1974	Kolchak: The Night Stalker	Jane Plumm	episode: "The Ripper"
1974-1975, 1978	Happy Days	Waitress / Marsha Simms / Marsha	21 episodes (+1 uncredited)
1975	Barney Miller	Miss Heartstone	episode: "Grand Hotel"
1975	Ellery Queen	Mary Lou Gumm	episode: "The Adventure of Miss Aggie's Farewell Performance"
1976	Lifeguard	Judy	
1976-1977	Wonder Woman	Etta Candy	Main cast (season 1)
1977	High Anxiety	Maid	
1977	Prime Time a.k.a. American Raspberry	Mother	
1981	American Pop	Prostitute	
1987	Who's That Girl	Secretary	
1988	Portrait of a White Marriage	Mrs. Peaco	

Preceded by No actress	Actresses to portray Etta Candy; 1976–1977	Succeeded by Lucy Davis
