= Etta Candy =

DC Comics character

- Etta Candy in Wonder Woman (vol. 5) #10 (2016). Art by Nicola Scott.

Publication information
- Publisher: DC Comics
- First appearance: Sensation Comics #2 (February 1942)
- Created by: William Moulton Marston; H. G. Peter

In-story information
- Full name: Etta Candy
- Team affiliations: A.R.G.U.S. United States Air Force; United States Army; United States Navy
- Supporting character of: Wonder Woman

Etta Candy is a fictional character appearing in DC Comics publications and related media, commonly as a close ally of the superhero Wonder Woman. Spirited and vivacious, with a devil-may-care attitude, Etta debuted as a young white woman with red hair in 1942's Sensation Comics #2, written by Wonder Woman's creator William Moulton Marston.

Enrolled in the fictional Holliday College for Women (and often accompanied by her fellow students, "the Holliday Girls"), Etta would become a constant feature of Wonder Woman's Golden Age adventures, effectively functioning as both the hero's plucky sidekick and her best friend. Unapologetically proud of her plus-sized figure (and vocal about her love of sweets), "Etta's appearance was a stark contrast to the svelte, wasp-waisted women depicted in most comic books, and Etta was a brave and heroic leader who was always in the thick of the fight beside her friend Wonder Woman." Though appearing less frequently in the Silver and Bronze Age, Etta was a recurring presence in Wonder Woman's supporting cast throughout both periods. She would be re-imagined in March 1987 by comics writer/artist George Pérez as part of his post-Crisis relaunch of the Wonder Woman mythos. This milder-mannered version, a former U.S. Air Force captain and intelligence officer, is not presented as Wonder Woman's best friend, but rather as a genial ally among a larger cast of supporting characters.

In 2011, Etta was again updated as part of DC Comics' company-wide New 52 continuity reboot. Still an American intelligence specialist, the rebooted Etta Candy is a Black woman, whose revised history with Wonder Woman restores several Golden Age elements, notably her wise-cracking joie de vivre and her status as the hero's ever-present best friend. Additionally, the New 52 Etta is queer, shown to have a romantic relationship with Barbara Ann Minerva, the British archeologist who would become Wonder Woman's arch-foe the Cheetah. Etta's brassy queerness brings to the surface a consistent lesbian subtext present in William Moulton Marston's original Golden Age characterization of a woman joyously defiant of sex-gender norms.

Beatrice Colen portrayed Etta in the 1970s Wonder Woman series. The character made her cinematic debut in the DC Extended Universe in the 2017 film Wonder Woman, played by Lucy Davis. She has been portrayed in animated film by voice actors Julianne Grossman and Adrienne C. Moore.

== Character history ==
=== Golden Age ===
The Golden Age Etta Candy in Wonder Woman #18, July 1946; art by Harry G. Peter.

In her 1940s introduction, Etta Candy is a sickly malnourished woman Wonder Woman discovers at a local hospital. (Note: This version is from the Wonder Woman comic strip, written after Etta's first appearance in the comic books in Sensation Comics #2 in 1942.) When next seen, Etta is transformed into a spirited, rotund young woman who has a great love of candy. When Wonder Woman asks about her new body type, Etta tells her that she was rejuvenated by eating many sweets. With her newfound confidence, Etta Candy soon after leads the fictional Beeta Lambda sorority at Holliday College and aids Wonder Woman in her adventures. First, with a hundred other Holliday girls, Etta helps Wonder Woman take over the Nazi base of Doctor Poison without endangering Steve Trevor. Throughout her adventures with Wonder Woman, Etta is known for her moxie, her love of candy, and for her trademark call "Woo! Woo!" (A catch-phrase derived, in part, from exclamations associated with comic actor Hugh Herbert and Curly Howard of The Three Stooges. Other versions of the character have been known to say "Woo! Woo!" and according to at least one version it is a sorority cry at Holliday College.) Other familiar characteristics included her jalopy car nicknamed Esmerelda, and a variety of sassy interjections, such as: "For the love of chocolate!"

Her father, Hard Candy, and mother, Sugar Candy, lived on the Bar-L Ranch in Brazos County, Texas, that provided the setting for cowboy-themed adventures. She was shown to have a brother named Mint Candy who served as a soldier in the US Army. Holliday College was the setting for science-driven stories and it was at nearby "Starvard" (portmanteau of Stanford and Harvard), that her boyfriend, the gangling but very loving "Oscar Sweetgulper," studied. She was shown to be brave and even stormed a Nazi concentration camp armed with nothing but a box of candy to rescue captured children. She was also welcomed by Wonder Woman's people, the Amazons of Paradise Island, and even invited to their festivals. She was aware of her weight but never let it bother her. She even joked about it when asked by the Amazons if she would like to join in one of their sporting events.

=== Silver and Bronze Age ===
When Robert Kanigher became writer and editor of the adventures of Wonder Woman, he made little use of Etta Candy and the Holiday girls. When he did, he portrayed Etta as an insecure, weight-conscious girl who followed but never led the girls in her sorority. This was in sharp contrast to Marston characterization of a bold, sassy, wisecracking leader. Despite a few appearances after Kanigher reintroduced her in 1960 (Wonder Woman #117) Candy was left in limbo for decades.

Etta Candy was revived twenty years later in 1980 (Wonder Woman #272), along with Steve Trevor and General Phil Darnell. In the years since her last appearance, Candy had not only graduated from Holiday College, but had become a Lieutenant and was on hand to welcome Wonder Woman back to her old job as Air Force officer Diana Prince something she hadn't done since 1968. Lieutenant Candy was featured as a secretary to Darnell and as Diana's roommate. Despite having been Wonder Woman's friend years previous, Candy had never met Diana Prince or learned her secret identity. Thus, from Candy's point of view, she and Prince met for the first time when Prince returned to the Air Force.

She was still portrayed as insecure and weight-conscious and, although she no longer said "for the love of chocolate", was known to swear by Betty Crocker. She also did most of the cooking between herself and her roommate. Her family was not expanded as much as was the family of her golden age incarnation though she did remark on being from a large family and had a niece named Suzie. Her love interest was now nerdy, hopelessly clumsy but nevertheless very loving Howard Huckaby.

In one adventure, Etta was kidnapped by Satanists influenced by Klarion the Witch Boy and sent to Hell, where Wonder Woman and Etrigan the demon had to travel to save her, although she remained narcotized and catatonic throughout the ordeal.

In the years leading up to Crisis on Infinite Earths (1986), writers Dan Mishkin and Mindy Newell took Etta in a different direction. She displayed more confidence, and even became Wonder Woman for one evening, battling Cheetah, Angle Man, Captain Wonder and Silver Swan. Huckaby, who by then had been convinced for several issues that his girlfriend was the comic book's titular heroine, used Doctor Psycho's machine that could turn his dreams into reality to let the world see Etta as he saw her. After the Amazonian "Wonder Etta" defeated the villains, she and others saw she was his Wonder Woman.

=== Post-Crisis ===
After the 1987 Greg Potter–George Pérez revamp of Wonder Woman, Etta was romantically linked with, and eventually married to, Steve Trevor, who was no longer Diana's love interest.

A career Air Force officer, Etta served as Steve Trevor's aide when he was framed for treason as part of Ares' scheme to spark a global war. Etta was fiercely dedicated to her friends, and her faith in Steve's innocence helped him clear his name, even though the two temporarily became fugitives while helping Wonder Woman overthrow Ares' plans. While on the run, Steve and Etta realized their love for one another. A happy couple, they remained friends with Wonder Woman.

Feeling insecure about her weight, Etta developed an eating disorder that was kept secret from her friends. She was able to lose 20 pounds, but at the expense of her health. When she finally collapsed due to a lack of food in front of Wonder Woman while trying on wedding gowns, Diana advised her to take better care of herself and maintain a sensible diet. Since that time, Etta has gained her original weight back.

Etta and Steve largely disappeared from the pages of Wonder Woman during the run of writer/artist John Byrne, and they appeared infrequently since then. She did appear once Diana lost her royal title during writer Phil Jimenez's run as her usual supportive friend, but was depicted as still insecure about her heavy weight and apprehensive about her marriage to Steve.

Writer Gail Simone later reintroduced Etta Candy as an intelligence officer requested by Sarge Steel to report on Diana Prince and her associations. This took place following the Infinite Crisis which altered Diana's origins and to an extent the origins of her supporting cast. Etta remained married to Steve Trevor and was a close friend of Diana and was also aware of Diana's dual identity. The full extent of her history with Diana following the new DCU continuity is not known.

Etta joined Wonder Woman on the Khund homeworld to convince an alien race called the 'Ichor' to cease their attacks. She was successful but returned to Earth only to be tortured by the villain Genocide, leaving her in a coma state. She eventually regained consciousness in the hospital some time during the next few issues, and after imploring Diana to not feel guilty over her torture at the hands of Genocide revealed that she was recruited as an operative by Mr. Terrific and Green Lantern as part of the U.N. Authority's observation of the D.M.A. three years earlier.

=== The New 52 ===
In September 2011, The New 52 rebooted DC's continuity. In this new timeline, Etta Candy appeared in the new Justice League title as Steve Trevor's secretary. She was now African American and depicted as young and ambitious, resembling the Etta played by Tracie Thoms in the unaired David E. Kelley Wonder Woman pilot. Trevor soon came to trust Etta, admitting to her secrets he kept close to himself, such as being in love with Wonder Woman.

During the Forever Evil storyline, Steve Trevor returned to the ruins of Washington DC's A.R.G.U.S. headquarters where Etta Candy told him that the destruction was caused by a massive spike in Doctor Light's body where the energies emitted from it exposed the A.R.G.U.S. agents. Etta Candy was later approached by an energy manifestation of Doctor Light.

=== Rebirth ===
After the events of Rebirth, Etta Candy continued working with Steve Trevor, but has been promoted to Commander Candy. Flashbacks throughout the story revealed Etta became friends with Dr. Barbara Minerva prior to becoming Cheetah and developed romantic feelings for her, which Barbara was implied to have returned. Etta is later referenced as working closely with A.R.G.U.S., a government group skilled in dealing with the super-human and super-natural.

== Other versions ==
=== Seven Soldiers ===
An aged Etta Candy appears in Seven Soldiers.

=== Earth-Two ===
An alternate universe variant of Etta Candy from Earth-Two, based on the Golden Age incarnation, appears in stories set in the eponymous universe. This version is a former college student who left to join the military and serve her country. Following the end of WWII, Etta resumed her studies and became a dietitian.

=== Superman & Batman: Generations ===
An alternate universe variant of Etta Candy appears in Superman & Batman: Generations. This version went on to marry Oscar Sweetgulper by 1953.

=== Wonder Woman: Amazonia ===
An alternate universe variant of Etta Candy appears in Wonder Woman: Amazonia. This version grew up as a homeless orphan on the streets of Victorian London alongside Diana. In her later years, Diana left to become a performer while Etta married a soldier, but was forced to become a prostitute after he eventually abandoned her. Upon reuniting with Diana years later, Etta becomes a governess to the former's children.

=== Wednesday Comics ===
An alternate universe variant of Etta Candy appears in Wednesday Comics. This version is a teenager who befriended a young Diana when the latter first came to the United States.

=== Convergence: Wonder Woman ===
An alternate universe variant of Etta Candy, based on the pre-Crisis incarnation, appears in Convergence: Wonder Woman. After alerting Wonder Woman to a doomsday cult that had risen amidst the events of Convergence, Etta is kidnapped and converted by a vampiric Joker before she is killed by Steve Trevor.

=== Sensation Comics Featuring Wonder Woman ===
An alternate universe variant of Etta Candy appears in Sensation Comics featuring Wonder Woman #8.

=== Wonder Woman: Earth One ===
An alternate universe variant of Etta Candy, based on the pre-Crisis Earth-Two incarnation and renamed Beth, appears in Wonder Woman: Earth One.

=== The Legend of Wonder Woman ===
Etta Candy in The Legend of Wonder Woman (vol. 2) #16 (2016); art by Renae de Liz and Ray Dillon.

An alternate universe variant of Etta Candy appears in The Legend of Wonder Woman.

== In other media ==
=== Television ===
Beatrice Colen as Corporal Etta Candy.

- Etta Candy appears in Wonder Woman (1975), portrayed by Beatrice Colen. This version is General Phil Blankenship's secretary.
- Etta Candy appears in Wonder Woman (2011), portrayed by Tracie Thoms.

=== Film ===
- Etta Candy appears in Wonder Woman (2009), voiced by Julianne Grossman. This version is Steve Trevor's secretary.
- Etta Candy appears in films set in the DC Extended Universe, portrayed by Lucy Davis.
  - Introduced in Wonder Woman (2017), this version is Steve Trevor's secretary who befriends Wonder Woman after she leaves Themyscira.
  - Candy appears in a photograph depicted in Wonder Woman 1984.
- Etta Candy, based on the New 52 incarnation, appears in Wonder Woman: Bloodlines, voiced by Adrienne C. Moore.

=== Video games ===
Etta Candy appears as a character summon in Scribblenauts Unmasked: A DC Comics Adventure.

=== Miscellaneous ===
- Etta Candy appears in All-New Batman: The Brave and the Bold.
- Etta Candy appears in Smallville Season 11 #19. This version is a lieutenant in the United States Air Force.

== See also ==
- List of Wonder Woman supporting characters
