= Wonder Woman (1974 film) =

1974 television film by Vincent McEveety

- DVD cover.
- Genre: Fantasy
- Based on: Wonder Woman by: William M. Marston; H. G. Peter
- Written by: John D. F. Black
- Directed by: Vincent McEveety
- Starring: Cathy Lee Crosby; Kaz Garas; Charlene Holt; Ricardo Montalbán; Richard X. Slattery; Andrew Prine; Anitra Ford
- Music by: Artie Butler
- Country of origin: United States
- Original language: English

Production
- Executive producer: John D. F. Black
- Producer: John G. Stephens
- Cinematography: Joseph Biroc
- Editor: Gene Ruggiero
- Running time: 75 minutes
- Production company: Warner Bros. Television

Original release
- Network: ABC
- Release: March 12, 1974

Wonder Woman is a 1974 American made-for-television superhero film based on the DC Comics character of the same name, directed by Vincent McEveety and starring Cathy Lee Crosby. The film was a pilot for an intended television series being considered by ABC. The film presented the character as a James Bond–style superspy, and did not contain many elements from the comic book series. Ratings were described as "respectable but not exactly wondrous," and ABC did not pick up the pilot.

Instead, Warner Brothers and ABC developed a different Wonder Woman television concept that fit the more traditional presentation of the character as created by William Moulton Marston, turning away from the 1968–1972 era that had influenced the pilot. The New Original Wonder Woman, which premiered in 1975, starred Lynda Carter and eventually led to the Wonder Woman TV series. Crosby would later claim that she was offered the chance to reprise the role in that series.

== Background ==
Cathy Lee Crosby in the first Wonder Woman film.

The film, Wonder Woman's first appearance in live-action television, was made in 1974 for ABC. Written by John D. F. Black, the TV movie resembles the Wonder Woman of the "I Ching" period. Wonder Woman (Cathy Lee Crosby) does not wear the comic book uniform, demonstrates no apparent superhuman powers, and is depicted as blonde (differing from the black hair established in the comic books).

The pilot aired originally on March 12, 1974. and was repeated on August 21 of that year. Ratings were described as "respectable but not exactly wondrous". ABC did not pick up the pilot, although Crosby would later claim she was offered the series that was eventually given to Lynda Carter. An ABC spokesperson would later acknowledge that the decision to update the character was a mistake. DC Comics, however, did make this version canonical in the limited run Infinite Crisis as Wonder Woman of Earth-462.

Warner Bros. released this pilot into syndication as a stand-alone 90-minute telefilm, where it played on independent TV stations throughout the 1970s and 1980s. In December 2012, Warner Brothers made the Cathy Lee Crosby pilot available as a Video On Demand purchase through their online store.

== Plot ==
Diana Prince is chosen to leave Paradise Island to become Wonder Woman and show the world the value of women. Later, Diana, as assistant to government agent Steve Trevor (Kaz Garas), pursues a villain named Abner Smith (Ricardo Montalbán), who has stolen a set of code books containing classified information about U.S. government field agents. Along the way, she has to outwit Smith's chief assistants: the handsome yet dangerous George (Andrew Prine) and a rogue Amazon, Ahnjayla (Anitra Ford), whom Smith has taken on as a bodyguard; a brief duel between Wonder Woman and Ahnjayla is the film's only significant action sequence, which occurs during the final third of the story.

== Cast ==
- Cathy Lee Crosby as Diana Prince (Wonder Woman)
- Kaz Garas as Steve Trevor
- Charlene Holt as Hippolyta
- Ricardo Montalbán as Abner Smith
- Richard X. Slattery as Colonel Henkins
- Andrew Prine as George Calvin
- Anitra Ford as Ahnjayla
- Beverly Gill as Dia
- Sandy Gaviola as Ting
- Robert Porter as Joe
- Jordan Rhodes as Bob
- Donna Garrett as Cass
- Roberta Brahm as Zoe
- Thom Carney as Fred
- Ed McCready as Wesley

== Home media ==
Warner Home Video released the TV film to DVD in 2012 through Amazon.com and their Warner Archive collection.
