= Aquaman in other media =

Adaptations of Aquaman in other media
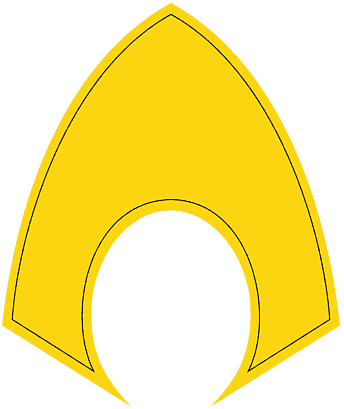
- Original source: Comics published by DC Comics
- First appearance: More Fun Comics #73 (September 1941)

Films and television
- Film(s): Batman v Superman: Dawn of Justice (2016); Suicide Squad (2016); Justice League (2017); Aquaman (2018); Zack Snyder's Justice League (2021); Aquaman and the Lost Kingdom (2023)
- Television show(s): The Superman/Aquaman Hour of Adventure (1967); Aquaman (1967); Super Friends (1973–86); Justice League (2001–2004); Smallville (2001); Aquaman (2006); Justice League Unlimited (2006–2008); Aquaman: King of Atlantis (2021)

Games
- Video game(s): Aquaman: Battle for Atlantis (2003); Injustice: Gods Among Us (2013); Injustice 2 (2017)

Aquaman has made several appearances in numerous adaptations since his comic book debut in 1941. The character has also been referenced beyond the scope of traditional comics entertainment.

== Television ==
=== Animated ===
Aquaman as he appears in The Superman/Aquaman Hour of Adventure. Concentric rings are shown coming from his forehead as a special effect related to his telepathic control of and communication with fish.

- Aquaman appears in The Superman/Aquaman Hour of Adventure, voiced by Marvin Miller. The series featured Mera, Aqualad, a pet walrus named Tusky, and Aquaman's seahorses Storm and Imp. In addition to his usual array of abilities, this version of Aquaman could generate concussive water blasts.
- Aquaman appears in the Super Friends franchise, voiced initially by Norman Alden and later by William Callaway. This version possesses an encyclopedic knowledge of oceanography and oceanology. Furthermore, the series has been blamed for making Aquaman unpopular, and even laughable, by making him appear to be weak.
- Aquaman appears in the parody miniseries The Aquaman & Friends Action Hour.
- Aquaman appears in series set in the DC Animated Universe (DCAU), voiced initially by Miguel Ferrer and later by Scott Rummell. This version holds a low view of humanity and is initially viewed as an urban legend. Following his introduction in Superman: The Animated Series, Aquaman appears in Justice League (2001) and Justice League Unlimited, where he joins the eponymous group and loses his hand while battling his evil brother Orm.
- Aquaman appears in Batman: The Brave and the Bold, voiced by John DiMaggio. This version is a friendly and bombastic adventurer. Additionally, Sea King, an alternate universe variant of Aquaman who is a member of the Crime Syndicate, appears in the episode "Deep Cover for Batman!".
- Aquaman appears in DC Super Friends, voiced by Mark Deakins.
- Aquaman appears in Young Justice, voiced by Phil LaMarr. This version is a member of the Justice League. In the third season, he begins sharing the Aquaman title with Kaldur'ahm.
- Aquaman appears in Mad, voiced again by John DiMaggio.
- Aquaman appears in Teen Titans Go!, voiced by Patrick Warburton.
- Aquaman appears in Aquaman: King of Atlantis, voiced by Cooper Andrews.
- Aquaman appears in Harley Quinn, voiced by Chris Diamantopoulos.
- Seaman, a parody of Aquaman, appears in South Park, voiced by Trey Parker.
- Arthur Curry appears in the DC Super Hero Girls episode "#TheAquamanCometh", voiced by Will Friedle. This version talks and acts like Matthew McConaughey.

=== Live-action ===
- Aquaman appears in Smallville, portrayed by Alan Ritchson.
- Aquaman appears in a self-titled television pilot, portrayed by Justin Hartley.
- The DC Extended Universe iteration of Aquaman (see below) makes a cameo appearance in the Peacemaker episode "It's Cow or Never", portrayed by an uncredited Jason Momoa.

== Film ==
=== Live-action ===
- Aquaman was intended to appear in Justice League: Mortal, portrayed by Santiago Cabrera, before it was cancelled. Years later, it was reported that an Aquaman film was in development at Leonardo DiCaprio's Appian Way Productions, though that film also was never created.
- Aquaman appears in films set in the DC Extended Universe (DCEU), portrayed by Jason Momoa. He appears in Batman v Superman: Dawn of Justice (2016), Suicide Squad (2016), Justice League (2017), a self-titled film (2018), Shazam! (2019), Zack Snyder's Justice League (2021), The Flash (2023), and Aquaman and the Lost Kingdom (2023).

=== Animated ===
==== Animated theatrical films ====
- Aquaman makes a non-speaking cameo appearance in The Lego Movie.
- Aquaman makes a non-speaking cameo appearance in The Lego Batman Movie.
- Aquaman appears in The Lego Movie 2: The Second Part, voiced by Jason Momoa.
- Aquaman appears in DC Super Heroes vs. Eagle Talon, voiced by Kazuya Nakai.
- Aquaman appears in Teen Titans Go! To the Movies, voiced by Eric Bauza.
- Aquaman makes a non-speaking cameo appearance in Space Jam: A New Legacy.
- Aquaman appears in DC League of Super-Pets, voiced by Jemaine Clement.

==== Direct-to-video films ====
- Filmmaker Adam Green was commissioned to write a screenplay for an animated Aquaman film, which went unproduced.
- An animated film based on Aquaman was first mentioned by Bruce Timm in 2010, but was cancelled due to marketing concerns.
- Aquaman appears in Justice League: The New Frontier, voiced by Lex Lang.
- Aquaman appears in Justice League: Crisis on Two Earths, voiced by Josh Keaton.
- Aquaman appears in Justice League: The Flashpoint Paradox, voiced by Cary Elwes.
- Aquaman appears in JLA Adventures: Trapped in Time, voiced by Liam O'Brien.
- Aquaman appears in Lego DC Comics: Batman Be-Leaguered, voiced again by Dee Bradley Baker.
- Aquaman appears in Justice League: Throne of Atlantis, voiced by Matt Lanter.
- Aquaman makes a non-speaking cameo appearance in Justice League Dark.
- Aquaman appears in Scooby-Doo! & Batman: The Brave and the Bold, voiced again by John DiMaggio.
- Aquaman appears in The Death of Superman, voiced again by Matt Lanter.
- Aquaman appears in Lego DC Comics Super Heroes: Aquaman – Rage of Atlantis, voiced by Dee Bradley Baker.
- Aquaman appears in DC Super Hero Girls: Legends of Atlantis, voiced by Max Mittelman.
- Aquaman appears in Lego DC Comics Super Heroes: The Flash, voiced again by Dee Bradley Baker.
- Aquaman makes a non-speaking cameo appearance in Justice League Dark: Apokolips War, where he is killed in battle with Darkseid.
- An alternate universe variant of Aquaman from Earth-Two appears in Justice Society: World War II, voiced by Liam McIntyre.
- Aquaman appears in Injustice, voiced by Derek Phillips.
- Aquaman appears in Teen Titans Go! & DC Super Hero Girls: Mayhem in the Multiverse, voiced again by Will Friedle.
- An alternate universe variant of Aquaman from Earth-146 appears in Justice League: Crisis on Infinite Earths, voiced by Liam McIntyre.

== Video games ==
Aquaman as seen in the Justice League Heroes game.

- Aquaman appears in Justice League Task Force.
- Aquaman appears in Aquaman: Battle for Atlantis.
- Aquaman appeared as an unlockable character in Justice League Heroes, voiced by Bryce Johnson.
- Aquaman appears in the prequel comic of Mortal Kombat vs. DC Universe.
- Aquaman appears in Batman: The Brave and the Bold – The Videogame, voiced again by John DiMaggio.
- Aquaman appears in DC Universe Online, voiced by Jens Anderson.
- Aquaman appears as a playable character in Infinite Crisis, voiced by Josh Keaton.
- Aquaman appears as a playable character in DC Unchained.
- Aquaman appears in Young Justice: Legacy, voiced again by Phil LaMarr.
- Aquaman appears in Justice League: Cosmic Chaos, voiced again by Cooper Andrews.
- Aquaman appears in MultiVersus, voiced again by Phil LaMarr.

=== Lego ===
- Aquaman appears as a playable character in Lego Batman 2: DC Super Heroes, voiced by Brian Bloom.
- Aquaman appears as a playable character in Lego Batman 3: Beyond Gotham, voiced by Scott Porter.
- Aquaman appears as a playable character in Lego Dimensions, with Brian Bloom reprising the role.
- Aquaman appears as a playable character in Lego DC Super-Villains, with Scott Porter reprising the role. His Crime Syndicate counterpart Sea King also appears, voiced by Dee Bradley Baker. The cinematic incarnation of Aquaman appears in DLC inspired by the film, voiced by Lex Lang.

=== Injustice ===
Aquaman appears as a playable character in the Injustice video games, voiced again by Phil LaMarr. In the first game, he has downloadable alternate costumes based on his appearances in Flashpoint and Blackest Night.

=== Fortnite ===
Aquaman appears as a cosmetic outfit in Fortnite.
