= Nuidis Vulko =

Fictional DC Comics character

Publication information
- Publisher: DC Comics
- First appearance: The Brave and the Bold #73 (September 1967)
- Created by: Bob Haney; Howard Purcell

In-story information
- Alter ego: Nuidis Vulko
- Species: Atlantean
- Team affiliations: Royal Family of Atlantis
- Partnerships: Aquaman; Mera; Aqualad (various); Aquagirl (various)
- Supporting character of: Aquaman
- Abilities: Atlantean physiology grants ability to breathe underwater, superhuman strength, superhuman speed, enhanced swimming capabilities, and durability to withstand the pressures of the ocean.; Extensive political influence, capable tactician, and is considered a scientific genius.

Nuidis Vulko, or simply Vulko, is a fictional character appearing in American comic books published by DC Comics. The character is a recurring supporting character of Aquaman within the realm of Atlantis's politics. In his original portrayal, he often served under Aquaman as Atlantis's Chief Science Advisory, considered known for his loyalty, leadership and brilliant mind that enabled him to later serve as Aquaman's regent. Following the 2011 New 52 continuity reboot, Vulko is reintroduced as the chief royal advisor under Queen Atlanna. After Atlanna's supposed death, Vulko falls from grace when he claims her son, Orm Marius, is responsible. Cast out in disgrace, Vulko seeks to avenge her death by helping Arthur Curry, Atlanna's half-human elder son, gain the throne over Orm. However, Vulko's actions betray Aquaman's trust, making him a criminal and a reluctant ally for a period of time.

In the DC Extended Universe, the character is portrayed by Willem Dafoe in Aquaman. Initially, the character was slated to make an appearance in Justice League, but all of Dafoe's scenes were ultimately cut from the film. Dafoe appeared as the character in Zack Snyder's Justice League.

== Publication history ==
Nuidis Vulko was created by Bob Haney and Howard Purcell where he first appeared in The Brave and the Bold #73 (cover-dated Sept. 1967). His look was redesigned by Nick Cardy for Aquaman #35.

== Fictional character biography ==
Nuidis Vulko is the chief scientific adviser of Atlantis and is probably its greatest political and academic figure. He has been involved in most of the political changes and revolution the city has gone through since he first appeared. Vulko has been called doctor, professor, commander, and he even became king of Atlantis in the Earth-2 continuity. He knew Aquaman's mother Atlanna and was an advisor to King Trevis. He was present at Aquaman's birth, and argued against leaving Aquaman to die, claiming the curse of Kordax was a silly superstition.

During the Infinite Crisis event, Vulko is killed when the Spectre destroys Atlantis. The Spectre, not in his right mind, believed that magic was the source of all evil and had been attacking Atlantean sorcerers. Vulko's ghost becomes a mentor to the second Aquaman, Arthur Joseph Curry.

=== The New 52 ===
Nuidis Vulko is resurrected following The New 52 continuity reboot, where he is depicted as a former adviser of Atlantis who fled to the surface world to escape from Ocean Master. While living in Norway, Vulko is confronted by Arthur Curry, who is searching for Atlantis. Vulko tells Aquaman that he is the rightful heir of Atlantis's throne and must overthrow Ocean Master, his brother.

During the "Throne of Atlantis" event, creatures known as the Trench attack Ocean Master and the Atlantean soldiers. Vulko assaults Stephen Shin, revealing that Vulko (who hired Black Manta to steal an Atlantean scepter) is responsible for the Atlantean war. Vulko is imprisoned for his actions and intended to be executed, but the prison warden prevents the Atlantean guards from attacking Vulko because he has not yet gone to court.

=== Rebirth ===
During Dan Abnett's run on Aquaman, Vulko is mysteriously released from jail during Corum Rath's uprising. He observes the Crown of Thorns capsuling the city of Atlantis and the fall of Aquaman. Teaming up with rebels, Vulko succeeds in alerting Mera when he learns that Arthur is alive. He reluctantly teams up with Arthur, despite Arthur no longer trusting him.

== Powers and abilities ==
As a Atlantean, Vulko possesses natural superhuman abilities that grant him enhanced strength, durability, sight, swimming, and speed, enabling him to thrive in the depths of the ocean and live underwater indefinitely. Vulko is a skilled political manipulator and possesses extensive knowledge of Atlantean history and mythology.

== In other media ==
=== Television ===
- Nuidis Vulko appears in the "Aquaman" segments of The Superman/Aquaman Hour of Adventure.
- Nuidis Vulko appears in Young Justice, voiced by Jeff Bennett.
- Nuidis Vulko appears in Aquaman: King of Atlantis, voiced by Thomas Lennon.

=== Film ===
- Nuidis Vulko appears in Justice League: The Flashpoint Paradox, voiced by Peter Jessop.
- Nuidis Vulko appears in the films set in the DC Extended Universe, portrayed by Willem Dafoe. This version is a general advisor to Arthur Curry who trained him in martial arts and taught him about his Atlantean heritage.
  - Vulko was intended to appear in Justice League (2017) before his scenes were cut. The scenes were restored in the director's cut, Zack Snyder's Justice League (2021).
  - Vulko appears in Aquaman (2018).
  - Vulko was intended to appear in Aquaman and the Lost Kingdom (2023), but was dropped due to Dafoe being unavailable. As such, the character was killed offscreen by ocean pollution.

=== Video games ===
- Nuidis Vulko appears as a character summon in Scribblenauts Unmasked: A DC Comics Adventure.
- Nuidis Vulko appears as a playable character in Lego DC Super-Villains.
