= Black Manta =

- Textless cover of Aquaman (vol. 7) #12 (October 2012). Art by Ivan Reis (pencils), Joe Prado (ink) and Rod Reis (colors).

Publication information
- Publisher: DC Comics
- First appearance: Aquaman #35 (September 1967)
- Created by: Bob Haney (writer); Nick Cardy (artist)

In-story information
- Alter ego: David Milton Hyde
- Species: Human
- Team affiliations: Injustice League; Secret Society of Super Villains; Legion of Doom; O.G.R.E.; N.E.M.O.; Suicide Squad; Mantamen
- Partnerships: Ocean Master; Gallous the Goat; Jesse Hyde
- Abilities: Genius-level intellect; Skilled swordsman, marksman, and hand-to-hand combatant; High-tech armor grants: Superhuman strength, speed, stamina, agility, durability, and reflexes; Optic blasts; Hidden weaponry; Artificial gills for underwater breathing

Black Manta (David Milton Hyde) is a supervillain appearing in American comic books published by DC Comics. Created by writer Bob Haney and artist Nick Cardy, the character first appeared in Aquaman #35 (September 1967). He has since endured as the archenemy of the superhero Aquaman.

Black Manta has had numerous origin stories throughout his comic book appearances, having been a young boy kidnapped and enslaved by pirates on their ship; an orphan subjected to cruel experiments in Arkham Asylum; and a high-seas treasure hunter caught in a mutual cycle of vengeance with Aquaman over the deaths of their fathers. Despite these different versions of his past, Black Manta is consistently depicted as a ruthless underwater mercenary who is obsessed with ruining Aquaman's life. As Aquaman's nemesis, Black Manta has been part of the superhero's defining stories, including the murder of Arthur Curry Jr.–Aquaman's infant son–and numerous attempts to destroy Aquaman's home kingdom of Atlantis. A black armored suit with a large, bug-eyed metal helmet serves as Black Manta's visual motif.

The character has been adapted in various media incarnations. Yahya Abdul-Mateen II portrayed Black Manta in the DC Extended Universe films Aquaman (2018) and Aquaman and the Lost Kingdom (2023), while Kevin Michael Richardson, Khary Payton, and others have provided his voice in animation and video games.

== Fictional character biography ==
=== Varying origins ===
Black Manta first revealed without his helmet in Adventure Comics #452. Art by Jim Aparo.

Black Manta had no definitive origin story until #6 of the 1993 Aquaman series. In this origin, the child who would become Black Manta grew up in Baltimore, Maryland, and loved to play by the Chesapeake Bay. In his youth, he was kidnapped and forced to work on a ship for an unspecified amount of time, where he was physically abused by his captors. At one point, he saw Aquaman with his dolphin friends and tried to signal him for help but was not seen. Finally, he was forced to defend himself, killing one of his tormentors on the ship with a knife. Hating the emotionless sea and Aquaman, whom he saw as its representative, he was determined to become its master.

An alternative version was given in #8 of the 2003 Aquaman series. In this origin, the boy who would become Black Manta was an autistic orphan placed in Gotham City's Arkham Asylum. He felt comfortable in freezing cold water but found cotton sheets excruciatingly painful. Because the attendants at Arkham did not know how to deal with autism, they would end up restraining him to the bed as he struggled and screamed whenever they tried putting him to bed. In this version, young Black Manta was also fascinated when he saw Aquaman on television. The boy would end up being subjected to experimental treatments. One treatment seemed to clear the boy's head, but left him violent as a result; he killed the scientist who had administered the treatment and escaped from Arkham.

=== Criminal career ===
As an adult, Black Manta designed a costume (primarily a black wetsuit with a bug-eyed helmet, that was able to shoot rays from its eyes) and fashioned a high-tech submersible inspired by manta rays. Taking the name Black Manta, he and his masked army became a formidable force, engaging in at least one unrecorded clash with Aquaman prior to his first appearance as a rival to the Ocean Master (and before joining the short-lived Injustice League in the retcon Silver Age third-week event).

Black Manta and Aquaman battled repeatedly over the next several years. During one of these clashes, it is revealed that Black Manta is actually black, whose stated objective at one point was for black people to dominate the ocean after having been oppressed for so long on dry land; though it was soon revealed by Cal Durham, one of his more idealistic henchmen, that Manta was more obsessed with his own personal desires. During most of his appearances, his main goals are defeating Aquaman and gaining power for himself through the conquest of Atlantis. Finally, Manta kills Arthur Curry, Jr., Aquaman's son, which leaves Aquaman obsessed with revenge.

During the "Underworld Unleashed" storyline, the demon Neron transforms Black Manta into a humanoid manta ray in exchange for his soul. After a while, he returns to wearing his original outfit which covers his new appearance. At one point he engages in drug smuggling from his new base in Star City, where he is opposed by a returning Green Arrow and Aquaman.

In a later confrontation, Aquaman, sporting the Lady of the Lake's Healing Hand, reverses Neron's alterations to Black Manta and rewires Manta's afflicted brain, rendering him non-autistic for the first time in his life. Unfortunately, Manta remains a violent criminal, lulling Aquaman into a false sense of partnership and almost killing the Sea King in the process.

In later events, Black Manta is used as a genetic manipulation test subject to make water breathers. This succeeds; since then, Black Manta has returned to the oceans to face Aquaman once again.

Black Manta causes a disturbance in Sub Diego in which Captain Marley is severely injured. Aquaman summons various predatory sea-life to attack Black Manta and leaves him for dead. It is later revealed that Black Manta was able to survive by generating an electric charge with his suit.

One Year Later, he overtakes Sub Diego but is forced to flee when King Shark bites off his face.

When Aquaman dies at the end of the 2003 series, Black Manta begins working for Libra as part of the Secret Society of Super Villains. However, after Libra betrays the group and helps Darkseid conquer the Earth, Black Manta quits.

In a 2011 Brightest Day storyline called "Aquawar", Black Manta has retired from his criminal ways. He has opened a fish market to earn an honest living. When he discovers that Aquaman has been resurrected following the end of the Blackest Night, Black Manta murders the customers in the store and burns down his shorefront house as he resumes his criminal career and vendetta against Aquaman.

The Death Squad battles Black Manta, but before the fight continues too long, Siren stops them. She informs Black Manta that they need to work together to find his son, showing him a hard water image of Jackson Hyde. It is also revealed during this time that Black Manta's real name is David. Black Manta and Siren locate Jackson and attempt to kill his foster father. Jackson fights back but is unable to stop Black Manta from shooting a trident-shaped dart at his foster father. At the last moment, Aquaman intervenes, blocking the fatal shot. Black Manta then faces his old nemesis again. During the battle, Aquaman pulls Jackson and his foster father to safety. In a flashback, it is revealed that Black Manta was once a treasure hunter who, along with his wife, was captured while exploring the Bermuda Triangle. Their captors were the other-dimensional residents of Xebel, and the two were tortured mercilessly. The captors experimented on Black Manta's pregnant wife which gave the unborn child powers similar to those of the residents of Xebel. Fearing the child (Jackson) would be used as a pawn in an invasion of Earth, Xebel princess Mera kidnapped the child and took him to Earth, where she arranged him to be adopted and raised far away from water to keep him from her people. Black Manta ultimately escaped from Xebel, though his wife ultimately died. After Jackson learns the truth behind his origin, Aquaman and Jackson (now calling himself Aqualad) are ambushed by Siren and the Xebel soldiers on a California beach, where innocent citizens become caught in the crossfire. As Aquaman is about to strike back at Siren, Black Manta springs from the water and severs Aquaman's right hand. Jackson attacks his father, berating him for siding with the people who killed his own wife, only for Black Manta to throw Jackson to the ground and coldly state that both he and his mother meant nothing to him. As Black Manta prepares to impale his son with one of his blades, Mera arrives with Aquagirl, who saves Jackson by striking Black Manta in the face. Jackson and Mera work together to seal Black Manta, Siren, and the rest of the invaders away in the Bermuda Triangle. Black Manta vows from within the prison to get his son, Jackson.

=== The New 52 ===
In 2011, "The New 52" rebooted the DC universe. In this continuity, Black Manta's real name is David. His family are descended from a tribe of Atlanteans called the Deserters. In David's early life, Aquaman killed Black Manta's father Jesse Hyde by accident in retaliation for attacking Aquaman's father Thomas Curry when Stephen Shin contracted David to obtain the DNA of Aquaman, who later mistook Jesse for David when exacting vengeance.

Black Manta kills a woman named Kahina the Seer, a former teammate of Aquaman, and steals her Atlantean relic. He then vows to kill her entire family before getting his revenge on Aquaman. A flashback shows that Aquaman created a team known as the Others (forged of six Atlantean relics from the Dead King's tomb) who are trying to catch Black Manta, but they fail and Black Manta escapes. Black Manta goes after Aquaman's former teammate Prisoner-of-War in Heidelberg.

Seeking revenge, Black Manta attempted to kill all of Aquaman's family and friends. When Black Manta chased Prisoner-of-War, he was confronted by Aquaman in a battle. During the attack, Black Manta stole one of Ya'Wara's Atlantean relics and teleported to Stephen Shin, Aquaman's former friend. Black Manta then tasered Mera and pulled Shin to him to teleport away.

Meanwhile, the Others were reunited and discovered that there was a seventh Atlantean relic in the Dead King's tomb. Manta took Shin captive in the Dead King's tomb to find the seventh relic and located in the Dead King's throne. Manta prepared to kill Shin but was thwarted when Aquaman and the Others attacked his henchmen. Black Manta killed Vostok-X and escaped with the relic scepter. After Vostok-X's death, Aquaman, through tears, swore that he would kill Manta in revenge. Black Manta delivered the relic scepter to a mysterious Atlantean, who was revealed to be his employer, but the Others ambushed them and attacked. The mysterious Atlantean managed to grab the relic scepter and escape while Black Manta was forced to battle the Others, resulting in Manta and his henchmen being taken away by the authorities. While in Belle Reve, Black Manta refused to join Amanda Waller's Suicide Squad.

During the Forever Evil storyline, Waller approached Black Manta again to join the Suicide Squad. Black Manta declined again at the same time as Deathstorm and Power Ring invade Belle Reve. After hearing Waller's offer to join the Suicide Squad, Black Manta retrieved his equipment during Belle Reve's prison break and accepted the Secret Society's coin. At the Justice League's Watchtower, after claiming Aquaman's trident, Black Manta tossed the coin in the ocean. Black Manta took the trident to his father's grave stating his quest to kill Aquaman was over. Looking up, he witnessed Ultraman moving the moon in front of the sun resulting in the creation of massive tidal waves. The waves washed the grave of Black Manta's father away which gave him a new purpose: to destroy the Crime Syndicate. After retrieving Black Adam's body from the ocean, Black Manta met up with Lex Luthor, Subject B-0, and Captain Cold, where he informed them of what Ultraman's actions did to his father's grave. Lex Luthor realizes that with the help of B-0, Adam, Black Manta, and Captain Cold, he might be able to stop the Crime Syndicate.

=== DC Rebirth ===
In 2016, DC Comics implemented another relaunch of its books called "DC Rebirth" which restored its continuity to a form much as it was prior to "The New 52".

==== The Drowning ====
Black Manta's first DC Rebirth appearance was in the one-shot Aquaman: Rebirth #1, acting as the narrator until he reveals himself at the very end. Manta later appeared in Aquaman vol. 8 #1, in which he attacks Spindrift Station, an Atlantean embassy built by Aquaman near his hometown of Amnesty Bay to promote relations between Atlantis and the surface. Black Manta fights with Aquaman, and even wounds him, but the fight is ended with words about how hollow and empty Black Manta's purpose in life truly is. He is eventually taken into custody by the U.S. military, but the vehicle transporting him is attacked by N.E.M.O. forces. A woman named Blackjack takes him to the organization's base in Antarctica, where he meets the Fisher King. N.E.M.O plans to discredit Aquaman in the eyes of the world by manipulating conflicts with the United States and other surface nations, and Black Manta decides to continue this mission after killing the Fisher King and claiming the title for himself. In Aquaman vol. 8 #7, Manta appears at a meeting of the N.E.M.O board in Venice, Italy, where he kills those who oppose his rule as the Fisher King and commands the Shaggy Man to attack Atlantis. Later, Manta oversees N.E.M.O's usage of Atlantean pretender forces against the U.S., which prompts the nation to declare war on Atlantis. After a team of American Aquamarines, super-soldiers who can take on the form of sharks and other aquatic creatures, fails to assassinate Aquaman, the Atlantean king attacks Black Manta on his ship in the Azores in issue #15. Rather than surrender, Black Manta blows up the ship and all aboard, but Aquaman and Blackjack escape.

==== Rise of Aqualad/Blood of Manta ====
It is revealed that Manta survived the explosion, perhaps with the help of Blackjack, and has become obsessed with finding his illegitimate son Jackson Hyde, who has joined the Teen Titans. Manta's desire to find him stems from his remembrance of a lost relic with power over the sea itself, The Black Pearl, a weapon which can bend the oceans to the user's whim, which once belonged to a notorious Atlantean pirate who died in Xebel. Knowing only a denizen of Xebel had the map to its keep and only Xebelian hands could unseal it, he nearly murdered Hyde's mother to get to him. With his son in tow, Manta and Jackson set out to find his prize, needing his son to unlock the trove that the pearl was sealed in. Eventually, a clash broke out between him and the Teen Titans after achieving his goal and with it, power to dominate the world. He was finally bested by Aqualad, who near fatally electrocuted him before taking the pearl ring from his hand.

==== Year of the Villain ====
During the "Year of the Villain" event, Lex Luthor's Apex Lex form visited Black Manta. He gave him a gift in the form of the Mecha Manta which was programmed with the farmed data and DNA of Jesse Hyde.

==== Gaining the Trident of Orichalcum ====
While at Doctor Mist's headquarters, Black Manta was approached by his former underling Devil Ray for aid in completing the Trident of Orichalcum that is made from the Orichalcum stone that he found as it can only be wielded properly by someone of Deserter heritage as it is revealed that Black Manta's heritage comes from Atlantis' Deserter branch. After fighting Devil Ray who was unable to go through with detonating the poison bombs around Atlantis, Black Manta confiscated the Trident of Orichalcum and allowed Devil Ray to leave while advising him not to go down the same path as him.

== Skills and abilities ==
Black Manta is regarded as one of Aquaman's most formidable adversaries, with Amanda Waller classifying him as a "Code Alpha" threat during her time as director of A.R.G.U.S. While Black Manta does not possess innate superpowers, he compensates with exceptional combat skills, excelling both on land and underwater. His expertise in underwater combat is particularly notable. Black Manta's combat abilities are formidable enough to engage in combat with characters such as Deathstroke. Black Manta is depicted as exceptionally intelligent, having designed his own distinctive battle-suit and arsenal of advanced weaponry built into it. He is also known for his abilities as a treasure hunter, having collected various ancient artifacts that sometimes contain magical power which he'll sometimes use as weapons. Black Manta commands N.E.M.O., his own organization of henchmen and has the capability to provide artificial gills, although he has not personally undergone the experimental process himself.

=== Equipment and resources ===
Black Manta dons an armored battle suit that serves multiple purposes, allowing him to rival Aquaman and other Atlanteans. The suit provides him with an unlimited air supply, communication capabilities, enhanced strength, and the ability to withstand the ocean's extreme pressures. The helmet lenses are equipped with advanced laser beams capable of cutting through carbon steel, as well as infrared vision. The suit is insulated and its dark coloration provides camouflage benefits, allowing him to even adopt other disguises.

Black Manta has obtained powerful artifacts, including the Black Pearl, which grants him control over the oceans briefly until Aqualad recovered it from him. He also briefly possessed the Bone Crown, allowing him to control the Death Kraken although its original sea god master could only control it. Moreover, he formerly wielded a fragment of Arion's Tear of Extinction, enabling him to kill divine beings. Black Manta later incorporated Orichalcum, a mystical mineral connected to several Atlantis tribes, into his technology. Notably, he collaborated with Devil Ray to create a magical trident with various mystical abilities.

== Other versions ==
=== Justice ===
Black Manta appeared as one of the major villains in the 2005-2006 Justice miniseries by Alex Ross and Jim Krueger as part of the Legion of Doom. This version appears to be based on the time period when Black Manta fought for African Americans as shown by all of his henchmen being black and his city being completely populated by African Americans. He is first seen luring Aquaman into an ambush and controlling Aquaman's sharks into attacking him before taking Aquaman to Brainiac. When Lex Luthor makes his speech to the world to join him in saving it, Black Manta is one of the villains alongside him.

As the Legion begins kidnapping the people close to the heroes, Black Manta takes control of Garth and forces him to assault Mera and kidnap Aquaman's son. During the Justice League's attack on the Hall of Doom, Black Manta faces off against Aquaman for the entire battle. Black Manta is one of the few villains to escape the Justice League and teleport to his city along with Aquaman's son, who follows behind him. Aquaman eventually finds Black Manta's hideout, but Black Manta's men savagely beat him in front of his son, comparing it to the treatment of his own people. Aquaman counters Black Manta is doing the same by using Doctor Sivana's technology to control his men, smashing the pack on Black Manta's suit to free his henchmen from Black Manta's control. Black Manta realizes that Aquaman was right, but makes one last effort to kill him in desperation. He is quickly struck down by Aquaman, saying that Black Manta never really had a chance to begin with.

=== JLA/Avengers ===
Black Manta appears in JLA/Avengers #4 where he is shown trapped by Plastic Man.

=== Flashpoint ===
In the alternate timeline of the Flashpoint event, Black Manta was an inmate at the military Doom prison before the prison break.

=== DC x Sonic the Hedgehog ===
Black Manta appears in DC x Sonic the Hedgehog, where he is a member of the Legion of Doom. Also appearing is Metal Manta, a robotic duplicate created by Doctor Eggman as a member of the Metal Legion.

== In other media ==
=== Television ===
Black Manta as depicted in Young Justice

- Black Manta appears in the "Aquaman" segment of The Superman/Aquaman Hour of Adventure, voiced by Ted Knight.
- Black Manta, referred to simply as Manta, appears in The All-New Super Friends Hour, voiced again by Ted Knight.
- Black Manta appears in Challenge of the Superfriends, voiced by Ted Cassidy. This version is a member of the Legion of Doom.
- Black Manta appears in the Family Guy episode "It Takes a Village Idiot, and I Married One" as a member of the Legion of Doom.
- Black Manta appears in the Harvey Birdman, Attorney at Law episode "Peanut Puberty".
- Black Manta, referred to simply as Manta, appears in the Smallville episode "Prophecy" as a member of Marionette Ventures.
- A parody of Black Manta called Black Eel appears in the Duck Dodgers episode "Till Doom Do Us Part", voiced by Jim Cummings.
- A character based on Black Manta named Devil Ray appears in Justice League Unlimited, voiced by Michael Beach. According to writer Dwayne McDuffie, Black Manta's name was changed because the rights to Aquaman characters were unavailable. Devil Ray appears as a primary member of Gorilla Grodd's Secret Society until he is killed by Deadman.
- Black Manta appears in Robot Chicken, voiced by Tom Kane in the episode "But Not In That Way", Neil Patrick Harris in the Robot Chicken DC Comics Special, and Seth Green in Robot Chicken DC Comics Special 2: Villains in Paradise. This version is a member of the Legion of Doom.
- Black Manta was set to appear in an Aquaman television series had the pilot episode been picked up.
- Black Manta appears in Batman: The Brave and the Bold, voiced by Kevin Michael Richardson. Additionally, an unnamed heroic version of Black Manta from an alternate universe makes a non-speaking appearance in the episode "Deep Cover for Batman!".
- Black Manta appears in Young Justice, voiced by Khary Payton. This version is initially an agent for the Light in the first season before becoming a leading member in the second season. After being defeated and captured by his son Kaldur'ahm, Black Manta joins Task Force X in the third season.
- Black Manta appears in the "Animal Man" segment of DC Nation Shorts.
- Black Manta appears in Teen Titans Go!, voiced by J. B. Smoove.
- Black Manta appears in Harley Quinn, voiced by Phil LaMarr. This version is a member of the Legion of Doom.
  - Black Manta appears in Kite Man: Hell Yeah!, voiced again by LaMarr.

=== Film ===
==== Live-action ====
A mannequin of the Black Manta costume worn by Yahya Abdul-Mateen II in Aquaman (2018)

Black Manta appears in films set in the DC Extended Universe (DCEU), portrayed by Yahya Abdul-Mateen II. This version is David Kane, a pirate whose grandfather served as a frogman in the U.S. Navy during World War II under the codename "Manta".

- The character first appears in Aquaman (2018). He and his father Jesse (portrayed by Michael Beach) are hired by King Orm Marius of Atlantis to hijack a Russian submarine. Arthur Curry intervenes and Jesse is killed in the confrontation, causing David to swear vengeance against Arthur. Using advanced Atlantean armor and weaponry provided by Orm, David rechristens himself as "Black Manta" and attacks Arthur in Sicily, Italy, but is ultimately defeated and thrown off a cliff. In a mid-credits scene, he is rescued by Dr. Stephen Shin and agrees to lead him to Atlantis in exchange for his help in seeking revenge on Arthur.
- A cancelled, horror-themed spin-off film with the working title "The Trench" was later revealed by Aquaman director James Wan to be a misdirect that was secretly a Black Manta film.
- Black Manta returns in Aquaman and the Lost Kingdom (2023). Upon finding the cursed Black Trident, David is promised the power to destroy Arthur by the spirit of its creator, Kordax, if he frees him from the lost kingdom of Necrus. David attacks Atlantis, steals its orichalcum reserves to power Necrus' machines, and kidnaps Arthur and Mera's son to perform a blood ritual to release Kordax. After being defeated, David refuses Arthur's help and allows himself to fall into a fissure.

==== Animation ====
- Black Manta makes a cameo appearance in Justice League: The New Frontier.
- Black Manta makes a non-speaking cameo appearance in Superman/Batman: Public Enemies.
- The Flashpoint incarnation of Black Manta makes a non-speaking appearance in Justice League: The Flashpoint Paradox as one of Aquaman's enforcers until he is killed by Batman and Grifter.
- Black Manta appears in JLA Adventures: Trapped in Time, voiced again by Kevin Michael Richardson. This version is a member of the Legion of Doom.
- Black Manta appears in Lego DC Comics Super Heroes: Batman Be-Leaguered, voiced again by Kevin Michael Richardson.
- Black Manta appears in Justice League: Throne of Atlantis, voiced by Harry Lennix.
- Black Manta appears in Lego DC Comics Super Heroes: Justice League – Attack of the Legion of Doom, voiced again by Kevin Michael Richardson. This version is a founding member of the Legion of Doom.
- Black Manta appears in Suicide Squad: Hell to Pay, voiced by Dave Fennoy. This version previously worked with the Suicide Squad.
- Black Manta makes a non-speaking appearance in Justice League Dark: Apokolips War as a member of the Suicide Squad.

=== Video games ===
- Black Manta appears as an unlockable character in Aquaman: Battle for Atlantis.
- Black Manta appears as a boss in Young Justice: Legacy, voiced again by Khary Payton.
- Black Manta appears as a boss in DC Universe Online.
- Black Manta appears as a character summon in Scribblenauts Unmasked: A DC Comics Adventure.
- Black Manta appears as a playable character in DC Unchained.
- Black Manta appears in Injustice 2, voiced by Kane Jungbluth-Murry. He was initially a non-player character (NPC) who appears in the Atlantis stage before becoming a playable character via downloadable content.
- Black Manta appears as a playable outfit in Fortnite Battle Royale.

==== Lego ====
- Black Manta appears as a playable character in Lego Batman 2: DC Super Heroes.
- Black Manta appears as a playable character in Lego Batman 3: Beyond Gotham, voiced by Fred Tatasciore.
- The mainstream and DCEU incarnations of Black Manta appears as a playable character in Lego DC Super-Villains, voiced again by Fred Tatasciore.

=== Miscellaneous ===
- Black Manta appears in Justice League Unlimited #26.
- Black Manta appears in The Aquaman & Friends Action Hour.
