= Justice League: War =

2014 Warner Bros. Animation film directed by Jay Oliva

- Home video release cover art
- Directed by: Jay Oliva
- Written by: Heath Corson
- Based on: "Justice League: Origin" by Geoff Johns; Jim Lee
- Produced by: James Tucker
- Starring: Christopher Gorham; Justin Kirk; Shemar Moore; Jason O'Mara
- Edited by: Christopher D. Lozinski
- Music by: Kevin Kliesch
- Production companies: Warner Bros. Animation; DC Entertainment; MOI Animation (animation services)
- Distributed by: Warner Home Video
- Release dates: January 21, 2014 (digital); February 4, 2014 (physical)
- Running time: 79 minutes
- Country: United States
- Language: English

Justice League: War is a 2014 American animated superhero film featuring the DC Comics superhero team the Justice League, and an adaptation of the story "Justice League: Origin" by Geoff Johns and Jim Lee, the first story in arc DC's 2011 DC Universe relaunch of its entirely monthly comics line. It is directed by Jay Oliva and scripted by Heath Corson. It is the 19th film of the DC Universe Animated Original Movies, and the second film in the DC Animated Movie Universe. The film depicts an invasion of Earth by the alien and demon "New God", Darkseid, and the formation of the titular superhero team that forms in order to counter it, which includes Superman, Batman, Wonder Woman, Flash, Green Lantern, Cyborg and Shazam.

The film was released for downloading on January 21, 2014 and was released on Blu-ray and DVD formats on February 4. It had its world premiere at the Paley Center for Media on the same day. Warner Home Video re-released the film on a combo pack in August 2015, which includes a DVD and Blu-Ray copy, a digital copy, and the graphic novel it is based on.

A stand-alone sequel, Justice League: Throne of Atlantis, was released in January 2015. The film also begins a story arc which is revisited in Reign of the Supermen and concludes in Justice League Dark: Apokolips War.

== Plot ==
A series of abductions have occurred in Gotham City; Batman is implicated due to video footage. Green Lantern stops a kidnapping before attacking the kidnapper, a Parademon, and is almost defeated when Batman appears. The Parademon attacks them both; Batman and Green Lantern chase it into the sewers, where it charges a Mother Box and explodes. They examine the box, deduce it is of extraterrestrial origin, and decide to ask Superman for an answer. Another Mother Box, supplied by Flash is being studied at S.T.A.R. Labs by Silas Stone, father of Victor Stone.

Superman, who fought with a Parademon previously and believes Batman and Green Lantern are working with it, fights the both of them; the two are hopelessly outmatched, with the battle only stopping when Batman calls him "Clark" and Superman discovers Batman is Bruce Wayne. The trio begin to work together against the Parademons. On the planet Apokolips, Darkseid orders DeSaad to begin an invasion of Earth in response to the superheroes' discovery of his plans. Victor and Silas argue over Silas' belief that metahumans are more important than football. Superman, Batman and Green Lantern realize an invasion has begun when the box activates and several Boom Tubes appear throughout the world.

The Box in S.T.A.R. Labs explodes and creates a Boom Tube when Victor is holding it. The explosion fuses the technology inside the Box to Victor's mutilated body. As several Parademons attack, Silas takes Victor to a technologically advanced medical bed and uses experimental technologies on him. Countless Parademons appear and attack around the world. The Box's technology spliced with Victor's body fuses with the various technologies around the room. Victor is transformed into Cyborg, with a body capable of transforming and adapting itself, including obtaining new features. Just as the Flash saves the scientists, Cyborg discovers details of Apokolips, Darkseid, and the invasion plan. He learns that the Parademons are inhabitants of worlds conquered by Darkseid, spliced with his technology, allowing him to mind-control them into serving as an army for conquering other planets. Billy Batson sees a Parademon outside and mystically turns into the superhero Shazam. Air Force One is attacked in the air, but is saved by Wonder Woman and Superman as he becomes smitten with her. After the heroes gather, Cyborg reveals that the invasion is a prelude to the xenoforming of Earth. Darkseid arrives and quickly outmatches the Justice League.

Darkseid uses his Omega Beams to fight Flash and Superman, who is incapacitated and captured by a Parademon. Batman prevents Green Lantern from going after them on his own with a broken arm. He tells Green Lantern to think about the lives at stake rather than his own image as a hero, and after unmasking himself, reveals that his parents' murders are what motivated him to fight evil. Bruce allows himself to be captured to save Superman. Green Lantern has the idea to strip Darkseid of his Omega Beams by destroying his eyes. Bruce goes through a portal to Apokolips, where he escapes the Parademon and stops DeSaad from turning Superman into a Parademon. Superman is left unstable and aggressive by the brainwashing process, resulting in him killing DeSaad and attacking Batman before being subdued. On Earth, after Darkseid's eyes are destroyed by the Justice League, Cyborg reopens the Boom Tubes to return Darkseid and his army to Apokolips. Darkseid fights back, and with Superman and Batman's assistance, the group force him through the portal. With the world saved, the superheroes gain the public's trust and are honored at the White House.

In a post-credits scene, an Atlantean ship emerges from the ocean and Ocean Master appears carrying the dead body of his king. He believes that the surface dwellers on Earth are responsible, calling it an act of war from the surface, for which he swears revenge. (Note: Marking continuity to the 2015 film Justice League: Throne of Atlantis.)

== Voice cast ==
Voice actor	Character
Alan Tudyk	Kal-El / Clark Kent / Superman
Jason O'Mara	Bruce Wayne / Batman
Michelle Monaghan	Diana Prince / Wonder Woman
Justin Kirk	Hal Jordan / Green Lantern
Christopher Gorham	Barry Allen / The Flash
Shemar Moore	Victor Stone / Cyborg
Sean Astin; Zach Callison	Billy Batson / Shazam
Steve Blum	Uxas / Darkseid
Dee Bradley Baker	Parademons
Ioan Gruffudd	Thomas Morrow
Richard McGonagle	President
George Newbern	Steve Trevor
Bruce Thomas	DeSaad
Rocky Carroll	Silas Stone
Kimberly Brooks	Darla
Georgie Kidder	Freddy Freeman
Hynden Walch	Hannah Grace
Melique Berger	Sarah Charles

== Music ==
Justice League: War - DC Universe Animated Original Movie (Original Motion Picture Soundtrack)

Film score by Kevin Kliesch
- Released: February 4th, 2014
- Length: 54:40
- Label: WaterTower Music

The soundtrack to Justice League: War was released on February 4, 2014. The music was composed by Kevin Kliesch.

=== Track list ===
Justice League: War – DC Universe animated original movie (original motion picture soundtrack)
No.	Title	Length
1.	"Justice League: War" (opening titles)	0:39
2.	"Green Lantern Meets The Parademon"	0:47
3.	"Rooftop Battle/Chase Through The City"	3:34
4.	"Underground Tunnels"	2:27
5.	"Silas Updates Barry"	0:41
6.	"Game Day"	1:19
7.	"Diana And The Angry Mob"	1:34
8.	"Billy Meers Victor/Superman Makes an Entrance"	2:30
9.	"Superfriend or Superfoe?/Enter Darkseid"	4:12
10.	"Parademons Break Through/Saving Victor"	3:19
11.	"Fighting The Parademons Horde"	2:04
12.	"Billy Becomes Shazam"	0:42
13.	"Darkseid's Arrival"	4:46
14.	"Batman Unmasked/Darkseid Homeworld"	2:02
15.	"The Heroes Join Forces"	1:47
16.	"Off To Rescue Superman/Darkseid Battle"	2:43
17.	"The Battle Continues"	7:10
18.	"Final Battle"	5:55
19.	"Saving The Day/Award Ceremony/End Titles"	6:29
Total length:		54:40

== Reception ==
=== Critical reception ===
The review aggregator Rotten Tomatoes reported an approval rating of 50%, with an average score of 5.8/10, based on 6 reviews. IGN gave a total score of 8.8/10, calling it a "great modern origin story that will win you over with its action and humor". CraveOnline gave it a rating of 9.0/10.

Conversely, Brian Lowry of Variety believes it did not reach the high standards of other DC Animated Movies; he wrote that "the interplay yields its share of moments but ultimately proves too frenzied and chaotic to deliver more than a few revisionist thrills". Additionally, Scott Mendelson of Forbes called the film a "dry run for Justice League" and criticized the plot, describing it as "monotonous".

=== Sales ===
Justice League: War earned $5,789,529 from domestic home video sales.

== Sequels ==
A follow-up, Justice League: Throne of Atlantis featuring Matt Lanter as Aquaman / Arthur Curry, was released in January 2015 with several of the first film's cast reprising their roles; notable changes include Alan Tudyk, Michelle Monaghan, and Justin Kirk, who were replaced by Jerry O'Connell, Rosario Dawson, and Nathan Fillion in the roles of Superman / Clark Kent, Wonder Woman / Diana Prince, and Green Lantern / Hal Jordan, respectively. Another sequel titled Justice League vs. Teen Titans was released in 2016 which introduced the Teen Titans into the DCAMU and featured them fighting the League, with the latter under control of the demon Trigon.
