= Throne of Atlantis =

Comic book narrative story arc created by DC Comics

- Cover for Aquaman #14, start of the "Throne of Atlantis" crossover. Art by Ivan Reis.
- Publisher: DC Comics
- Publication date: November 2012 – February 2013
- Genre: Superhero fiction Animation
Title(s)
- Justice League (vol. 3) #15–17
- Aquaman (vol. 7) #0 14–17

Creative team
- Writer: Geoff Johns
- Penciller(s): Ivan Reis, Paul Pelletier

"Throne of Atlantis" is a 2012–2013 comic book storyline created and published by DC Comics. The story arc consists of six issues from DC's Justice League and Aquaman publications, functioning in part as a larger buildup towards the "Trinity War" event. The plot was written by Geoff Johns, with art by Ivan Reis and Paul Pelletier.

In the story, believing Atlantis to be under attack, King Orm declares war on the surface world. Aquaman's allegiances are torn between his brother and the Justice League, while the latter group finds itself overwhelmed as the East Coast of the United States is swallowed by the ocean and the Atlantean royal troops march against humankind.

The storyline was loosely adapted into a 2015 animated film, Justice League: Throne of Atlantis.

== Summary ==
A Navy warship incites the wrath of the Atlanteans after its missiles malfunction during a test and end up attacking Atlantis. Ocean Master, the new king of Atlantis, declares war on the surface world. While they are in a café in Metropolis, Superman and Wonder Woman are forced to suit up and stop an aircraft carrier from flooding into the city and killing thousands of people. In the battle that follows the Justice League is captured, save Cyborg. He realizes they need help and calls in help from Green Arrow, Hawkman, Zatanna, Firestorm and more. The heroes stop Ocean Master and figure out that Aquaman's assistant Nuidis Vulko was behind the bombing so Arthur would take the throne once again.

== Reading order ==
- Aquaman (vol. 7) #0
- Aquaman (vol. 7) #14
- Justice League (vol. 2) #15
- Aquaman (vol. 7) #15
- Justice League (vol. 2) #16
- Aquaman (vol. 7) #16
- Justice League (vol. 2) #17
- Aquaman (vol. 7) #17

== In other media ==
- The 2015 animated film Justice League: Throne of Atlantis is a loose adaptation of the story.
- Elements of the story arc were incorporated in the 2018 film Aquaman.

== Reception ==
Comic Book Resources's Doug Zawisza rated Justice League #15 4.5/5 stars: "This is what Justice League should and can be: heroic adventures, world-threatening calamities and human interaction. Johns has found his stride on this book and it certainly helps that the art team of Reis, Prado and Reis have come along for the adventure".
