= Justice Society: World War II =

2021 film by Jeff Wamester

- 4K UHD cover
- Directed by: Jeff Wamester
- Written by: Meghan Fitzmartin; Jeremy Adams
- Based on: Justice Society of America by: Gardner Fox; Everett E. Hibbard; Sheldon Mayer
- Produced by: Jim Krieg; Kimberly S. Moreau
- Starring: Stana Katic; Matt Bomer
- Edited by: Bruce A. King
- Music by: Kevin Riepl
- Production companies: Warner Bros. Animation; DC Entertainment
- Distributed by: Warner Bros. Home Entertainment
- Release date: April 27, 2021
- Running time: 84 minutes
- Country: United States
- Language: English

Justice Society: World War II is a 2021 American animated superhero film produced by Warner Bros. Animation and DC Entertainment. It is the 44th film of the DC Universe Animated Original Movies, being the second installment in the DC Animated Movie Universe's second phase, and the seventeenth overall. The film is directed by Jeff Wamester and stars the voices of Stana Katic and Matt Bomer. It tells an original story of the Flash ending up back in time to World War II, where he meets the Justice Society of America and helps them thwart the threat of the Nazis and the Advisor.

== Plot ==
During World War II, President Roosevelt was asked by Colonel Steve Trevor to get the United States involved by creating a team of superhumans. Consisting of Trevor, Black Canary, Hawkman, Hourman, Jay Garrick / Flash, and led by Wonder Woman, the Justice Society of America is formed.

In the present, (Note: Set after Superman: Man of Tomorrow.) Barry Allen and Iris West picnic in Metropolis, hoping to get away from "work", but their plans are disrupted by Superman fighting Brainiac. Allen comes to Superman's aid as the Flash. When Brainiac fires a Kryptonite bullet, Flash tries to catch it, but runs fast enough to channel the Speed Force for the first time. Guided by a voice, Allen arrives in what he believes is the past during a battle between the JSA and the Nazis. Despite some initial confusion, the JSA realizes Allen is an ally and seemingly comes from the future.

After that battle is over, the JSA's next mission involves saving a codebreaker from a Nazi fortress. He can presumably decode a message Trevor stole. Despite the risk of causing a time paradox, the heroes realize they need Allen's help.

The heroes and "Shakespeare", the JSA's war correspondent, break into the fortress, defeat the guards, and discover prisoners in the dungeons. A young prisoner (Note: Implied to be Kamandi.) in shackles recognizes Shakespeare, gives him a parcel containing a costume, and says he must stop something terrible from happening. A guard attacks Shakespeare, only for the bullets to bounce off him. Shakespeare's actual name turns out to be Clark Kent, but he has a different background from the Kent that Allen knows. Because of this, Allen realizes that he is in a parallel reality. Meanwhile, the JSA finds the codebreaker, whom Hawkman recognizes as Kent Nelson / Doctor Fate. Allen recognizes Fate as the man who called out to him. According to Fate, Barry can return to his own reality, but there is a lesson he needs to learn first and a mission he has to accomplish. Breaking the code with his powers, Fate directs the team to the Bermuda Triangle before disappearing.

Arriving at the Triangle by sub, the team is detected by Nazi warships. After depth charges disable the engines, the Flashes jump-start the sub while Wonder Woman attacks the enemy ships. The heroes are saved by Atlantean soldiers, who direct them to a nearby outpost. There, the JSA meets Aquaman, who imprisons them. The code turns out to be a trap, and Aquaman is being controlled by the Advisor, (Note: Implied to be the Psycho-Pirate.) a telepathic mercenary who is influencing the Atlanteans to work with the Nazis. The Advisor hopes to destroy them later and take over the planet. The Flashes join forces to break out. The team splits up, with one heading for New York to stop the Nazis and Atlanteans while Allen and Wonder Woman try to stop Aquaman and the Advisor from releasing sea monsters from the Trench.

While attacking Manhattan, the Atlantean forces are confronted by the JSA. The heroes gain the upper hand until the monsters arrive, killing Hawkman and wounding Hourman. Garrick and Canary destroy the monsters while Wonder Woman and Allen fight Aquaman. With the help of Trevor, Wonder Woman breaks Aquaman's trident knocking sense into him which frees him from the Advisor's control since he needs to be in proximity. Realizing what he has done, Aquaman retreats in guilt, and his troops cease their attack and leave. The Advisor then reveals that a follow-up strike by Nazi jet bombers is imminent before fatally wounding Trevor. Barry knocks out the Advisor while Kent, wearing the costume he was given, returns to destroy the bombers. Before dying, Trevor proposes to Wonder Woman for the umpteenth time; she finally accepts. The Advisor regains consciousness and escapes, and the JSA vows to avenge Trevor.

Before returning to his Earth, Allen says goodbye to the JSA. Wonder Woman gives him the ring Trevor gave her, warning him against holding off for tomorrow. Allen and Garrick use their combined speed to send the former back to the moment he intercepted the bullet. After destroying Brainiac with it, Allen suggests forming a superhero team (Note: Implied to be the Justice League, which is not formed until Allen, Kent and Green Arrow meet with Batman, Vixen and Martian Manhunter in the Justice League: Crisis on Infinite Earths and later appears in Green Lantern: Beware My Power.) to combat future threats. He then proposes to Iris, who accepts.

== Voice cast ==
Voice actor	Character
Stana Katic	Diana / Wonder Woman
Matt Bomer	Barry Allen / The Flash
Omid Abtahi	Carter Hall / Hawkman
Geoffrey Arend	Charles Halstead / Advisor
Darren Criss	Clark Kent / Superman (Earth-1); Clark Kent / "Shakespeare" / Superman (Earth-2)
Darin De Paul	Brainiac (credited); Franklin D. Roosevelt (uncredited)
Chris Diamantopoulos	Steve Trevor
Keith Ferguson	Kent Nelson / Doctor Fate
Ashleigh LaThrop	Iris West
Matthew Mercer	Rex Tyler / Hourman
Liam McIntyre	Arthur / Aquaman
Elysia Rotaru	Dinah Drake / Black Canary
Armen Taylor	Jay Garrick / The Flash

== Production ==
Justice Society: World War II was officially announced in August 2020, during the Superman: Man of Tomorrow panel at DC FanDome. Some of the concepts for the story and setting originated from a Wonder Woman animated series developed by producer Butch Lukic, who would later incorporate them into the film.

== Release ==
Justice Society: World War II was released on digital platforms on April 27, 2021, and was released on Blu-ray and DVD on May 11.

== Reception ==
On Rotten Tomatoes, the film has an approval rating of 81% based on 16 reviews, with an average rating of 7.10/10.

Jesse Schedeen of IGN rated the film a 9 out of 10: "Justice Society: World War II easily ranks among the best of the long-running DC Universe Movies series. It draws just the right amount of inspiration from the source material while also pulling from adventure movies like Raiders of the Lost Ark to spin an entertaining superhero yarn. It deftly avoids the pacing issues that have plagued so many of these movies and manages to take full advantage of nearly every member of its ensemble cast. Clearly, Warner Bros. should be putting Barry Allen at the center of these animated films more often".

The film earned $732,012 from domestic DVD sales and $2,887,606 from domestic Blu-ray sales, bringing its total domestic home video earnings to $3,619,618.

== Future ==
The Flash makes a non-speaking cameo in Batman: The Long Halloween, Part Two's post-credits scene. Additionally, Criss and Bomer reprised their roles as Clark Kent / Superman and Barry Allen / The Flash in the film Legion of Super-Heroes, which is also set in the Tomorrowverse.
