= Injustice 2 =

2017 video game

- North American cover art, featuring Superman
- Developer: NetherRealm Studios (Note: Ported to Windows by QLOC.)
- Publisher: Warner Bros. Interactive Entertainment
- Director: Ed Boon
- Producer: Andrew Stein
- Designer: John Edwards
- Artist: Steve Beran
- Writers: Dominic Cianciolo; Shawn Kittelsen
- Composer: Christopher Drake (Note: Additional music composition by Richard Carle, Dan Forden and Dynamedion.)
- Series: Injustice
- Engine: Unreal Engine 3; Unreal Engine 4 (mobile)
- Platforms: Android; iOS; PlayStation 4; Xbox One; Windows
- Release: May 9, 2017: iOS; WW: May 9, 2017 Android; WW: May 11, 2017 PlayStation 4, Xbox One; NA: May 16, 2017; AU: May 17, 2017; EU: May 19, 2017 Windows; WW: November 14, 2017
- Genre: Fighting
- Modes: Single-player, multiplayer

Injustice 2 is a 2017 fighting game developed by NetherRealm Studios and published by Warner Bros. Interactive Entertainment. It is the sequel to 2013's Injustice: Gods Among Us and the second installment in the Injustice series, which is based on the DC Universe. The storyline centers around Batman and his Insurgency's attempt to rebuild society after the fall of Superman's Regime; however, the arrivals of the newly formed supervillain group "The Society" and the alien Brainiac force Batman to consider freeing the imprisoned Superman to help combat the threats.

The game was initially released in May 2017 for the PlayStation 4 and Xbox One; a Windows version was released later in November 2017. An expanded version of the game, titled Injustice 2: Legendary Edition, was released in March 2018 for the PlayStation 4, Windows, and Xbox One. Similar to the previous installment, a companion mobile app was released for Android and iOS devices. A prequel comic book series of the same name, written by Tom Taylor, was also released beginning in April 2017.

The core gameplay remains similar to its predecessor, albeit with minor adjustments to returning game mechanics. Injustice 2 introduces a new feature called the Gear System, a loot-dropping system that rewards players with costume pieces and equipment that can be used to customize characters' appearances and modify their abilities and stats. According to developers, the idea for implementing a role playing game (RPG)-style progression system into a fighting game had existed since before the collapse of Midway Games, the original developer and publisher for the Mortal Kombat series. Director Ed Boon also sought to incorporate gameplay mechanics used by multiplayer shooter games, such as personalization, character creation, loot, and leveling up, into the fighting game genre, which led to the development of the Gear System.

The game won numerous awards and received positive reviews from critics, who praised its story, presentation, improved gameplay mechanics, abundance of in-game content, and character customization options, while criticizing its random loot and microtransaction systems.

== Gameplay ==
A gameplay screenshot of the Flash and Deadshot on the Metropolis stage

Injustice 2 is a fighting game in which players compete in one-on-one combat using characters from the DC Universe and other third-party franchises. Using different combinations of directional inputs and button presses, players must perform basic attacks, special moves, and combos to try to damage and knock out the opposing fighter. Injustice 2 retains numerous gameplay mechanics from Injustice: Gods Among Us, including environment interaction, stage transitions, clashes, and character traits. The trait system, like before, provides a temporary buff or ability that complements each character's playstyle. The super meter, which allows players to execute enhanced special moves and unlock powerful "super moves" when fully charged, also returns. Players can expend meter to perform new techniques, such as an evasive forward roll, which provides a way to overcome enemy keep-away tactics, or an air recovery, which lets characters escape an opponent's combo early. Most environmental attacks, which were completely unavoidable in the first Injustice game, can now be blocked or dodged; however, certain environmental attacks with large amounts of startup, such as throwing a car, remain unblockable.

Injustice 2 introduces a loot-dropping system, known as the "Gear System", which offers character-specific costume pieces and equipment with status-altering effects. The Gear System uses RPG-like mechanics to reward players with experience and loot after every match. Every playable fighter is given four base stats: strength, defense, health, and ability, the latter of which impacts special attacks. As players collect experience points and level up, their characters' base stats will increase. Players can enhance their base stats even further by equipping gear obtained through loot drops, which also lets players customize the look of their characters. Rarer gear can include one or more bonus augmentations, which range from new visual effects for special moves to higher yields of in-game currency or experience points. Players can receive additional bonuses by equipping their characters with all five pieces of a single gear set. Gear comes in three varieties: equipment, shaders, and abilities. Besides the random loot earned at the end of a fight, all three types of gear are available to purchase in loot crates, known as "Mother Boxes", using in-game currency. Each character has five equipment slots for donning new costume pieces, which include their head, torso, arms, legs, and an accessory; two ability slots for equipping new or modified special attacks; and one shader slot for altering their color scheme. The game will also include five separate gear loadouts for each character, allowing players to switch between their setups at the beginning of each match.

The game also includes a microtransaction system. Players can buy "Source Crystals" using real-world money to purchase cosmetic adjustments for fighters, such as premier skins and shaders, instead of waiting to obtain them through normal play. Source Crystals can also be used to buy "Transform Gear". Transform Gear lets players apply the visuals of one piece of gear to another, allowing them to match their preferred stat modifiers with their preferred costume pieces. Lastly, once players have reached Level 20 with at least one character, Source Crystals can be used to level up other characters to their maximum levels. NetherRealm representatives clarified that purchases made with Source Crystals are strictly cosmetic and offer no gameplay advantages.

In addition to the campaign, online, and arcade modes, Injustice 2 introduces a new "Multiverse" mode. Similar to the "Living Towers" mode from NetherRealm's previous title, Mortal Kombat X, the Multiverse allows players to travel through series of parallel worlds within the DC Universe and battle against opponents with various handicaps, stipulations, and goals. Online multiplayer features the option to disable Gear System upgrades and modifications, reducing all base stats to their default levels, turning any equipped gear into purely cosmetic items, and providing more balanced gameplay for competitive matches. Players can also form online "guilds" with up to 50 other players. Guild members can collaborate to complete daily and weekly cooperative objectives to earn and share gear exclusive to guild gameplay and climb the worldwide leaderboards.

== Plot ==
The game begins with Kara Zor-El (Laura Bailey) and an infant Kal-El escaping from Krypton during the invasion of Brainiac (Jeffrey Combs) on the planet. Aided by Kara's mother, they manage to escape aboard pods headed to Earth, but Kara's ship is knocked off course. Years later, prior to the events of the first game, Batman (Kevin Conroy) and his son Robin (Scott Porter) attempt to stop Superman's Regime from executing Arkham Asylum inmates. Failing to dissuade Superman (George Newbern), Batman fights him but is attacked by Robin, who prefers Superman's methods. Batman defeats Robin, but the latter leaves with Superman to join the Regime after executing Victor Zsasz.

In the present, 2 years after the Regime's fall, Batman and his Insurgency are attempting to restore social order. They learn of a new faction, the Society, composed of villains spearheaded by Gorilla Grodd (Charles Halford), who seeks global domination. Black Canary (Vanessa Marshall), an alternate universe Green Arrow (Alan Tudyk), and a reformed Harley Quinn (Tara Strong) are tasked by Batman with stopping the Society and track them to Slaughter Swamp, where they encounter Swamp Thing (Fred Tatasciore). Following the villains to Gorilla City, the heroes are warned by Doctor Fate (David Sobolov) of an incoming threat. Black Canary and Green Arrow are abducted by Brainiac, the mastermind behind the Society, who intends to add Earth to his collection of shrunken planets. After Brainiac takes over Batman's communications hub, Brother Eye, Batman searches for allies to defeat him.

While Catwoman (Grey DeLisle), a double agent for Batman in the Society, rescues Harley, a reformed Flash (Taliesin Jaffe) and Green Lantern (Steve Blum) join Batman to take down Brainiac. Green Lantern is sent to recruit Aquaman (Phil LaMarr), who agrees to help after Brainiac attacks Atlantis. Meanwhile, Black Adam (Joey Naber ), Wonder Woman (Susan Eisenberg), and Kara (who was rescued by Adam years prior and adopted the Supergirl alias) break Nightwing and Cyborg (Khary Payton) out of prison in an attempt to re-establish the Regime and defeat Brainiac. They are stopped by Blue Beetle (Antony del Rio) and Firestorm (Ogie Banks) before Batman arrives. Batman frees Superman and reluctantly allies with the Regime members on the condition that no one is killed in the upcoming battles.

Cyborg, Catwoman, and Harley go to the Batcave to free Brother Eye from Brainiac's control, and defeat the Society members sent to stop them. Meanwhile, Wonder Woman and Supergirl fight the remaining Society members in New Metropolis; when the former almost kills Cheetah (Erica Luttrell), Harley interferes, causing Wonder Woman to attack her. Supergirl goes to the Fortress of Solitude to confront Superman over the incident, and learns of his tyranny. As Brainiac prepares to destroy Earth after collecting enough cities, the Insurgency and the Regime attack his ship, but fail to get through its shields and seemingly lose Superman. The group decides to weaken the shields by using Aquaman's trident as a conduit for the magic of the Rock of Eternity, which Black Adam and Aquaman proceed to retrieve. They are followed by Grodd, who has brainwashed Black Canary, Green Arrow, and Blue Beetle, but they defeat the brainwashed heroes, and Aquaman executes Grodd.

Black Adam and Aquaman weaken Brainiac's shields enough for Batman and Supergirl to board his ship. They are captured, but a still-living Superman rescues them and helps Batman defeat the brainwashed Firestorm and Swamp Thing. Doctor Fate, ordered by the Lords of Order to help Brainiac, fights them, but he is defeated and freed from the Lords' control before Brainiac kills him. After defeating Brainiac, Superman takes control of the ship to restore the stolen cities, but inadvertently destroys New Metropolis and Coast City. As the others join them, the group is left divided over Brainiac's fate: Batman, the Flash, Green Lantern, and Supergirl want to keep him alive so they can learn how to restore the cities, while Superman, Wonder Woman, Black Adam, and Aquaman want him executed for his crimes. The tensions escalate into a fight, prompting the player to choose whether to control Superman or Batman. Both sides proceed to fight each other until Batman and Superman are the last ones standing. The two briefly reminisce of their past friendship before engaging in a final fight.

The game features two endings depending on the outcome of the fight:

- If Superman wins, he kills Brainiac and reforms the Regime. He later visits an imprisoned Supergirl, telling her he has restored Earth's cities and asking her to lead his new army. When she refuses, Superman reveals that he has brainwashed Batman using Brainiac's technology, threatening to do the same to her if she does not comply.
- If Batman wins, he permanently depowers Superman with Gold Kryptonite and imprisons him in the Phantom Zone. He then offers Supergirl membership in the re-established Justice League, which she accepts.

== Characters ==
The base roster for Injustice 2 includes 28 playable fighters, consisting of both new and returning heroes and villains. The game also features 10 additional characters available as downloadable content (DLC). Red Hood, Starfire, and Sub-Zero made up Fighter Pack 1, while Fighter Pack 2 brought in Black Manta, Hellboy, and Raiden, and Fighter Pack 3 introduced Atom, Enchantress, and the TMNT. Darkseid was a pre-order bonus and later made available as standalone DLC from the Fighter Packs.

New playable characters are listed in bold, while guest characters are listed with an underscore.

- Aquaman
- **Atom**^{DLC}
- **Atrocitus**
- Bane
- Batman
- Black Adam
- **Black Canary**
- **Black Manta**^{DLC}
- **Blue Beetle**
- **Brainiac**
- **Captain Cold**
- Catwoman
- **Cheetah**
- Cyborg
- Darkseid^{DLC}
- **Deadshot**
- **Doctor Fate**
- **Enchantress**^{DLC}
- **Firestorm**
- Flash (Barry Allen)
- **Gorilla Grodd**
- Green Arrow
- Green Lantern (Hal Jordan)
- Harley Quinn
- **Hellboy**^{DLC}
- The Joker
- **Poison Ivy**
- Raiden^{DLC}
- **Red Hood**^{DLC}
- **Robin**/Nightwing
- **Scarecrow**
- **Starfire**^{DLC}
- Sub-Zero^{DLC}
- **Supergirl**
- Superman
- **Swamp Thing**
- **Teenage Mutant Ninja Turtles**^{DLC}
- Wonder Woman

Additionally, several characters are playable as "premier skins", which transform characters from the existing roster into other characters from mostly DC Comics Universe with unique voices, dialogue, and in certain cases, altered normal/special/super moves and character powers.

- **Batwoman**^{MOB}
- **Beast Boy**^{MOB}
- **Bizarro**
- **Black Lightning**^{DLC}
- **Bruce Wayne**
- Deathstroke^{MOB}
- **Grid**
- Flash (Jay Garrick)
- **Hawkman**^{MOB}
- **Hush**^{MOB}
- Green Lantern (John Stewart)
- **John Constantine**^{MOB}
- Killer Frost^{MOB}
- Lord Joker^{MOB}
- Martian Manhunter^{MOB}
- **Mr. Freeze**
- **Orm Marius**^{MOB}
- **Peacemaker**^{MOB}
- **Power Girl**
- Raven^{MOB}
- **Reverse-Flash**
- **Robin King**^{MOB}
- Shazam^{MOB}
- Scorpion^{MOB}
- **Silver Banshee**^{MOB}
- The Batman Who Laughs^{MOB}
- **Vixen**
- **White Canary**^{MOB}
- Zatanna^{MOB}

^DLC: Available as downloadable content.
^MOB: Mobile-exclusive character

== Development ==
Injustice 2 was announced by NetherRealm Studios and Warner Bros. Interactive Entertainment on June 8, 2016. Following the release of Injustice: Gods Among Us, NetherRealm Studios sought to do "something unexpected and long-term" for its sequel, as well as give players "a level of control that makes playing [their] games a truly personal experience." Ed Boon also wanted to infuse various gameplay mechanics used by recent multiplayer shooter games, such as personalization, character creation, loot, and leveling up, into the fighting game genre. According to producer Adam Urbano, the idea of creating a fighting game utilizing a role playing game-like progression system had been floating around the studio since before the closing of Midway Games, the original developer and publisher for the Mortal Kombat series. Due to the success of the original Injustice, which earned NetherRealm Studios the trust of Warner Bros. and DC Comics, the development team decided to pitch their progression concept for the sequel, which was approved, leading to the implementation of the Gear System.

The Gear System was designed to encourage players to develop unique personal playstyles, while consistently rewarding them for investing time into the game. According to senior marketing game manager Brian Goodman, the developers wanted the Gear System to cater to both the casual and hardcore audiences. They hoped that hardcore players would appreciate the different mechanics offered by the system and create new strategies and fighting styles for each character, while casual players would enjoy the variety of visual customization options. NetherRealm also foresaw the potential issue with newer players being dominated by veteran players who have obtained rarer gear sets. To address this, the developers attempted to implement various solutions, such as giving players the option to disable stat modifiers during matches and the ability to buy rarer gear through the assorted tiers of Mother Boxes. A "balance team" was also consulted during development to try to prevent players from clustering around a small number of optimal builds.

NetherRealm Studios collaborated with DC Comics throughout Injustice 2's entire development process, including conceptualizing characters and determining the direction of the story. As with Injustice: Gods Among Us, NetherRealm was afforded extensive freedom with DC Comics' properties when designing characters. Lead designer John Edwards stated that all of their design ideas had to pass through DC Comics' approval process; though, the company had rarely rejected them. This allowed the developers to create a large variety of costume variations and visually distinct items inspired by decades of source material. "It's a mutual respect," explained art director Steve Beran. "They respect what we do, and we respect all their characters. We are fans of their characters and, I think, art-wise and design-wise, we put a lot of detail that hardcore fans will like. We tried to really honor every character."

Injustice 2 continues the storyline established in Injustice: Gods Among Us. Unlike the previous game, which centered on a multi-universe conflict, the plot for Injustice 2 takes place entirely within the alternate, dystopian universe. According to Injustice: Gods Among Us cinematic director Dominic Cianciolo, the story from the first installment provided a solid foundation for adapting the canonical histories of the game's newer cast, allowing the writers to fit their stories within the Injustice universe. The biggest challenge presented to the writers was extending the series' narrative without repeating the core Batman versus Superman conflict. This led to the inclusion of Brainiac as the game's central antagonist, as there were few characters in the DC Universe that could top "Dictator Superman" as a foe for Batman.

According to Goodman, the playable characters were decided upon by NetherRealm Studios in collaboration with DC Comics, similar to the previous title. The developers considered the characters' lore, personalities, abilities, popularity, participation in the story, and relationships with other characters during the roster selection process. Creative Director Ed Boon stated that Injustice 2's roster would contain more relatively obscure characters, since Injustice: Gods Among Us had covered most of DC Comics' most notable figures. He teased the possibility of third-party DLC characters, which were well received in Mortal Kombat X, eventually resulting in the inclusions of Hellboy from Dark Horse Comics created by Mike Mignola and the Teenage Mutant Ninja Turtles from Nickelodeon, originally created by Kevin Eastman and Peter Laird. Due to the success of Scorpion in the previous installment, who was the most downloaded DLC fighter, Boon also entertained the likelihood of NetherRealm including other Mortal Kombat characters as downloadable content, leading to the inclusions of Sub-Zero and Raiden. As with Scorpion, Sub-Zero and Raiden were given new costume designs by comic book artist Jim Lee.

Characters' facial animations were created with a custom photogrammetry facial scanner, which utilized 44 DSLR cameras with 50 mm fixed lenses. Character Art Lead Brendan George stated that 16 facial expressions were captured to create a single character; the 16 scans then took two to three days to process through their workstations. The data from their new scanner allowed the artists to produce a more advanced facial rig. All motion capture was performed in-house at NetherRealm Studios in Chicago, Illinois. According to Senior Technical Artist for Cinematics Andy Senesac, the animation team used four head-mounted camera systems in its motion capture shoots, each equipped with a choice of three different 4 mm, 5 mm, or wide-angled lenses that were used depending on the actor's head shape. The motion capture was then modified with manual animations to obtain the final result.

The online infrastructure for Injustice 2 utilizes the same rollback-based netcode introduced to Mortal Kombat X in its XL update. An online multiplayer beta test for both the PlayStation 4 and Xbox One versions was announced on January 19, 2017, which began soon afterwards on January 24 and lasted until February 21. The game's original soundtrack was composed primarily by Christopher Drake, with additional compositions from Richard Carle, Dan Forden, and Dynamedion. Injustice 2 runs on the Mortal Kombat X engine (Unreal Engine 3), with the mobile version running on Unreal Engine 4.

== Release ==
Injustice 2 released in North America on May 16, 2017; Australia on May 17, 2017; and most European countries including the United Kingdom on May 19, 2017, for PlayStation 4 and Xbox One. Aside from the standard edition of the game, a Digital Deluxe Edition and an Ultimate Edition were available for purchase. The Digital Deluxe Edition included three downloadable content (DLC) characters, the Power Girl premier skin, and one exclusive gear shader pack; the Ultimate Edition included nine DLC characters, the Reverse-Flash, John Stewart, and Power Girl premier skins, and two exclusive gear shader packs. Pre-orders of the game featured Darkseid as a playable DLC fighter.

On May 8, 2017, Warner Bros. Interactive Entertainment announced the Injustice 2 Championship Series, a global eSports program. The series offered amateur and professional players throughout North America, Europe, and Latin America a chance to compete in different programs for a portion of a US$600,000 prize pool. These included the Injustice 2 Pro Series, an international tournament; the GameStop Hometown Heroes tournament, set in the United States; the Path to Pro tournament, set in Europe; and the Liga Latina, set in Argentina, Chile, Mexico, and Peru. The top players from each program qualified for the ELEAGUE Injustice 2 World Championship, which featured a US$250,000 prize pool. The event took place in Atlanta, Georgia, from October 21 through November 10, and was streamed worldwide through the ELEAGUE website, Twitch, and YouTube; matches were also broadcast live on TBS in the United States. On April 10, 2018, NetherRealm announced that the Pro Series would return for a second season.

On October 24, 2017, Warner Bros. announced that a Windows version developed by QLOC, who had previously taken over development for Mortal Kombat X's PC port from High Voltage Software, was due for release in Q4 2017, with an open beta stage beginning on October 25. However, the beta was postponed for unspecified reasons, ultimately running between November 6 and November 11. The Windows version was released on November 14, 2017. Creative director Ed Boon has also discussed the possibility of a Nintendo Switch version.

=== Mobile version ===
Like its predecessor, a free-to-play mobile app based on Injustice 2 was iOS and Android devices on May 9, 2017, and May 11, respectively. The app was soft launched in the Philippines App Store in February 2017. It maintains several gameplay features from the original, including the swipe-based fighting mechanics, card collection, and three-on-three battles, but introduces various changes to the game's overall formula. Players are given the ability to move around the stage freely during combat, as well as use jumping and crouching attacks. The stamina management system returns; however, instead of each character receiving their own allotment of stamina, the player is given a single pool of stamina which depletes after every match. Fights also require higher levels of stamina than the previous game. The app includes login bonuses; daily objectives, which offer experience and coins; and achievements, which are long-term goals that reward players with premium gems and "hero shards" used for unlocking and leveling up characters. It also features game mechanics similar to those found in the console versions, such as ability and gear upgrades. The app includes a story mode, which released chapter by chapter in subsequent updates. According to Google Play, the Android version of the app has been downloaded at least ten million times since its release.

=== Downloadable content ===
According to Boon, NetherRealm Studios planned to take a more "aggressive approach" for downloadable content in Injustice 2 compared to their previous games. "One of the things we’ve been doing, trying to do more and more with every game...is to support it for a longer period of time," Boon stated, "With DLC characters, we’ve had four with Mortal Kombat, six with Injustice, eight with Mortal Kombat X, and with Injustice 2 we plan on continuing that pattern." On May 5, 2017, NetherRealm Studios announced Fighter Pack 1, which includes three DLC characters: Red Hood, Starfire, and Mortal Kombat's Sub-Zero. Red Hood was released on June 13, 2017; Sub-Zero was released on July 11, 2017; and Starfire was released on August 8, 2017. Fighter Pack 2, consisting of Black Manta, Mortal Kombat's Raiden, and Dark Horse Comics' Hellboy, was revealed on August 23, 2017, at Gamescom. Black Manta was released on September 12, 2017; Raiden was released on October 3, 2017, alongside the Black Lightning premier skin; and Hellboy was released on November 14, 2017. On October 3, 2017, during the finale of The CW's documentary television series Chasing the Cup: Injustice 2, Atom was revealed as the next DLC addition. The third DLC pack, Fighter Pack 3, was unveiled during the finals of the ELEAGUE Injustice 2 World Championship on November 11, 2017, which includes Atom, Enchantress, and Teenage Mutant Ninja Turtles (TMNT) protagonists Leonardo, Donatello, Michelangelo, and Raphael. Atom was released on December 12, 2017; Enchantress was released on January 9, 2018; and lastly, the Teenage Mutant Ninja Turtles were released on February 13, 2018. Players can select which TMNT member to play as using the Gear System; equipping one of four weapons — katana, bō, nunchaku, or sai — swaps between Leonardo, Donatello, Michelangelo, and Raphael, each with their own unique move sets. In tournament and online modes, where Gear System loadouts cannot be used, players can choose each turtle individually through the character select screen. At one point, NetherRealm had considered developing a Fighter Pack 0, which would consist of returning characters from Injustice: Gods Among Us, including Ares, Batgirl, Doomsday, and Shazam; however, the idea did not come to fruition. In April 2019, two years after the game's release, Ed Boon revealed on Game Informer that he wanted to include Neo from The Matrix as a guest character, but plans fell through for his inclusion.

=== Related media ===
During NetherRealm Studios' Injustice 2 panel at San Diego Comic-Con on July 22, 2016, Boon announced a digital comic book series which will detail the backstory to the events of the game. The series is written by Tom Taylor, who had previously worked on the tie-in comic books for Injustice: Gods Among Us. Bruno Redondo is its lead artist, with contributing artwork from Juan Albarran, Daniel Sempere, and Mike S. Miller. Beginning on April 11, 2017, the series was released in weekly chapters through various digital retailers, including ComiXology, Google Play Books, the Kindle Store, and DC Comics' own mobile app. Print versions became available for purchase on May 3, 2017, each containing multiple digital chapters.

It was announced on April 26, 2018, that the game would cross over with Mattel's Masters of the Universe series as a comic sequel to the game's "Superman's side" ending. The comic received six issues, from July 18, 2018, until January 2, 2019.

=== Injustice 2: Legendary Edition ===
On February 28, 2018, Warner Bros. Interactive Entertainment announced Injustice 2: Legendary Edition. Similar to the Ultimate Edition for Injustice: Gods Among Us, the Legendary Edition includes all previously released downloadable content for Injustice 2. It also introduces new features, such as an expanded tutorial system called the "Learn Hub", new gear items, and an increased character level cap. In addition, those who pre-order the Day One Edition of the Legendary Edition received a collectible coin, a steelbook case, a "comic exclusive download steel card", and 11,000 Source Crystals to use in-game. The Legendary Edition was released on March 27, 2018, for PlayStation 4, Windows, and Xbox One.

== Reception ==
=== Critical response ===
Reception

Aggregate score
Aggregator	Score
Metacritic	iOS: 77/100; PS4: 87/100; XONE: 89/100; PC: 86/100; PS4 (Legendary Edition): 88/100

Review scores
Publication	Score
Destructoid	9/10
Eurogamer	Recommended
Game Informer	9/10
GameRevolution	3/5
GameSpot	9/10
IGN	9/10
Polygon	9/10
VideoGamer.com	9/10
The Games Machine	9/10
Gamezebo	4/5

Awards
Publication	Award
Game Critics Awards	Best of E3 2016: Best Fighting Game
IGN	Best of E3 2016 Awards: Best Fighting Game
Game Informer	Best Of E3 2016 Awards: Best Fighting Game
GamesRadar+	Best Games of E3 2016
The Game Awards 2017	Best Fighting Game
IGN	Best of 2017 Awards: Best Fighting Game
Game Informer	Best of 2017 Awards: Best Fighting Game
D.I.C.E. Awards	Fighting Game of the Year

Injustice 2 received generally favorable reviews, according to Metacritic. Reviewers lauded Injustice 2's story and presentation. Eurogamer's Wesley Yin-Poole praised the game's narrative and visuals, describing them as "impressive" and a "significant step up" from Injustice: Gods Among Us. Yin-Poole commended the story mode on a technical level, praising the motion capture, action choreography, voice acting, and facial animations. Destructoid's Nick Valdez shared similar views, stating that the visuals were "leagues above the first title". Valdez also complimented the game's improved writing and "more engaging narrative". In contrast, while Game Revolution's James Kozanitis said the visuals were "absolutely jaw-dropping" and "set a new high bar for the [fighting game] genre", he lambasted the story campaign, which he labeled as "poorly written" and "contrived".

Reviewers also praised Injustice 2's improved gameplay mechanics and abundance of in-game content. Game Informer's Andrew Reiner praised the game's faster walk speed, the additions of the evasive roll and air recovery maneuvers, and the ability to block environmental attacks, stating that the game "[felt] tighter as a whole" and "offers a higher level of strategy". The Games Machine's Danilo Dellafrana stated that "the subtle changes to the combat system made for deeper gameplay". These points of praise were mirrored by IGN's Darry Huskey, who remarked that Injustice 2 "[struck] a fine balance between retaining the strengths of Gods Among Us and making smart changes to improve mechanics." Huskey applauded the "incredible amount of content", declaring that "hour for hour, Injustice 2 may have more content for solo players than any fighting game ever released." Reiner also praised the amount of content, acknowledging its "lengthy story-based campaign...great fighting experience, and...nearly endless supply of notable loot." Yin-Poole wrote that NetherRealm Studios "once again [proved] it's the best in the business at that old chestnut: content."

While the customization options offered by the Gear System received praise, critics expressed frustration with receiving random, undesired gear through loot drops and the game's microtransaction system. GameSpot's Peter Brown found collecting gear and outfitting characters to be enjoyable, stating that "watching a character's traditional outfit transform into something fresh or unexpected, and seeing their stats grow through leveling up and equipping gear, grants a satisfying sense of ownership over your accomplishments and possessions." On the other hand, Brown criticized the Gear System's use of currency, particularly Source Crystals, saying that spending real money seemed to be a "necessary evil" for players to have complete control over their inventories. Kotaku's Mike Fahey described the ability to create custom versions of characters as "quite satisfying"; however, he found the Gear System to be "complicated" and criticized the randomness in receiving desired costume pieces and equipment, uttering "sometimes random chance really sucks." VideoGamer.com's Alice Bell also called the microtransaction and loot systems "needlessly complex", which require players to keep track of several different types of currency. In contrast, Polygon's Michael McWhertor called the interface "elegant", enjoying the simplicity of managing and selling of gear for each character.

PC Gamer listed it as one of their best games of the year.

=== Sales ===
Injustice 2 topped the United Kingdom's multi-platform physical sales chart during its first two weeks after launch, with the PlayStation 4 and Xbox One versions simultaneously taking the first and second spots, respectively. This marked the first time a fighting game had taken the top spot since Mortal Kombat X in April 2015. Launch sales for the game in the United Kingdom were also roughly one-third higher than the debut of Injustice: Gods Among Us. Likewise, Injustice 2 was the top-selling game across all platforms in Australia and New Zealand during its first two weeks, and the best-selling game in the United States for the month of May 2017. It reached number 2 in Switzerland. It became the PlayStation Store's most downloaded PlayStation 4 title for May 2017, with Darkseid being the third best-selling DLC of the month. The Ultimate Pack and Fighter Pack 1 were both in the Top 10 downloads in June 2017. Three months later, Fighter Pack 2 also made the Top 10. By the end of May, Injustice 2 was the ninth best-selling game of 2017. Time Warner declared the game as "the highest-grossing console game in the second quarter of 2017," selling approximately 1.5 million copies in the first three months of its release. According to Ed Boon, as of August 2026 the game has sold 9 million units.

=== Awards ===
In June 2016, Injustice 2 received "Best of E3 2016" awards for "Best Fighting Game" from the Game Critics Awards, IGN, Game Informer, and GamesRadar. The game won "Best Fighting Game of 2017" awards from The Game Awards 2017, IGN, and Game Informer. IGN also nominated the game for "Best Xbox One Game" and "Best Spectator Game". The game was nominated for "Best International Game" at the 2017 Ping Awards, for "Best Xbox One Game" in Destructoid's Game of the Year Awards 2017, and for "Best Multiplayer Game" and "Studio of the Year" (NetherRealm) at the Golden Joystick Awards. In Game Informer's Reader's Choice Best of 2017 Awards, the game came in first place for "Best Fighting Game", third place for "Best Competitive Multiplayer" and fifth place for "Game of the Year". EGMNow ranked it eleventh on their list of the 25 Best Games of 2017, while GamesRadar+ ranked it 23rd on their list of the 25 Best Games of 2017. The Academy of Interactive Arts & Sciences awarded Injustice 2 with "Fighting Game of the Year", while also receiving a nomination for "Outstanding Achievement in Sound Design", at the 21st Annual D.I.C.E. Awards. It was also nominated for "Game, Franchise Fighting" at the 17th Annual National Academy of Video Game Trade Reviewers Awards.
