= Ocean Master =

- Textless cover of Aquaman #14 (January 2013). Art by Ivan Reis, Joe Prado, and Rod Reis.

Publication information
- Publisher: DC Comics
- First appearance: Aquaman #29 (September 1966)
- Created by: Bob Haney; Nick Cardy

In-story information
- Alter ego: Orm Marius (current); Orm Curry Marius (original)
- Species: Atlantean (current); Homo magi hybrid (former); Human (originally)
- Place of origin: Atlantis (current); Alaska (original)
- Team affiliations: Anti-Justice League; Injustice Gang; Legion of Doom; The Trench
- Partnerships: Black Manta; Lernaea; Scavenger
- Notable aliases: Orm the First; Prince Orm; King Orm; King of the Seven Seas; King of Dagon
- Abilities: Current continuity: Atlantean physiology: superhuman strength and durability, ability to breathe underwater, withstand the extreme pressures of the ocean and swim at enhanced speeds. Base abilities surpasses ordinary Atlanteans due to royal heritage.; Genius level intellect; proficiency in engineering, military operation, politics, sciences, oceanology, possesses exceptional knowledge of the history of the kingdom of Atlantis.; Skilled martial artist and mastery of trident-related combat. Various magical artifacts grant him hydrokinesis (his crown), and weather manipulation (his trident).; Original continuity: Nautical genius and tactician with access to advanced technologies and magical artifacts for a variety of uses.; Various magical artifacts and technologies, such as his magical trident, armor, and helmet, bolsters his magical abilities, enabling him to breathe underwater and survive the depths of the oceans for long periods of time.; Skilled hand-to-hand combatant, proficient in magic, and knowledgeable in Atlantean arcane lore.

Ocean Master is a supervillain appearing in American comic books published by DC Comics. The character was created by Bob Haney and Nick Cardy and debuted in Aquaman #29 (September 1966). One of Aquaman's most recognized adversaries who is characterized to often plot to usurp his position as the ruling monarch of Atlantis, the character has been subjected to revisions over the years.

Originally, the character was Orm Curry Marius, Aquaman's wayward, human half-brother envious of his sibling's superhuman powers and status as a hero. Becoming an international marine criminal, he takes the name "Orm Marius" and "Ocean Master". Following Crisis on Infinite Earths, the character is retroactively depicted as half homo magi, of Inuit origin, and related to Aquaman through Atlan. This sorcerous and royal origin story heightens the dramatic stakes of his plots to usurp the throne of Atantis.

Following his revision in the New 52, he is definitively established as Orm Marius, a full-blooded Atlantean royal whose parents includes Queen Atlanna (also Aquaman's mother), King Orvax Marius (making him half-brother of Tula), and is a descendant of Atlan and Arion. This version holds xenophobic views towards humans and a desire to punish them for their role in marine pollution. Although he similarly conspires to win the throne of Atlantis from Arthur, Orm is cast as a more benevolent but traditionalist ruler who is exiled by Aquaman, believing him a tyrant following Orm's attack on the United States. While embittered by the ordeal and acting as an antagonist, he is also a reluctant ally and anti-hero.

Ocean Master has been adapted from the comics into various forms of media.The character appeared in the DC Extended Universe films Aquaman (2018) and Aquaman and the Lost Kingdom (2023), portrayed by Patrick Wilson. Richard Green, Wallace Langham, Dana Snyder, and Sam Witwer have provided the character's voice in animation.

== Publication history ==
Ocean Master first appeared in Aquaman #29 (September 1966), created by Bob Haney and Nick Cardy during the Silver Age of Comics Books. A seemingly one-off story, the issue establishes the brotherly relationship between the characters. Originally in the story, the character was first established as a human pirate similar to Black Manta whose relation to Aquaman was shared.

The character would later make a major reappearance in the second Aquaman series, written by Neil Ponzer in 1987, following the reboot of the DC Universe through Crisis on Infinite Earths. The new story changes the nature of the character's powers and ties them to a new history and world established by the previous Arion, Lord of Atlantis title. The limited series also established his original origin in line with the Silver Age's version as being the wayward and ignored son of Tom Curry and Mary O'Sullivan.

Later in 1996, the character's background and origins were altered in Peter David's Aquaman: Time and Tide. This version depicts him as an indigenous Iñupiat man from Alaska who is Aquaman's half-brother through their shared father, Atlan.

In 2011, DC Comics would relaunch all of its monthly titles and reboot the DC Universe continuity. Among the changes included Orm's new origin, cast as a full-blooded Atlantean, whose shared parentage with Aquaman is through Atlanna, and having similar physical powers to Aquaman and abilities derived from artifacts. The character's first major appearance after the reboot is in the Throne of Atlantis storyline, which depicted the beginning of the antagonistic relationship between Ocean Master and Aquaman. Later stories would define Ocean Master and Aquaman's heritage further: the 2013 Death of a King storyline indirectly establishes Atlan (previously the father of Ocean Master) as their ancestral relative, and the 2019 Drowned Earth storyline establishing Arion as their ancient ancestor.

== Fictional character biography ==
=== Pre-Crisis ===
Orm Curry was Aquaman's full-human half-brother, the son of Thomas Curry (Aquaman's father) and a woman named Mary O'Sullivan. He grew up under the shadow of his heroic half-brother and resented the fact that he had none of Aquaman's powers. He was already a petty criminal when he was stricken with amnesia, forgot his former life, and disappearing.

Several years later, the self-named Orm Marius reappeared as the Ocean Master, a high-tech pirate who initially attacked ships but quickly moved on to causing natural disasters to hold the world at ransom. Aquaman and Aqualad were captured by Ocean Master but managed to escape. Aquaman, having seen behind Ocean Master's mask and realizing that he was his half-brother Orm, was then unable to fight Ocean Master, although he did stop his plan.

=== Post-Crisis on Infinite Earths ===
After the events of the Crisis on Infinite Earths storyline, significant changes were introduced to the Ocean Master character. In this revised version, Ocean Master is portrayed as a hybrid of half homo magi (ancient Atlantean) and human descent with Inuit heritage. This unique ancestry bestows upon him inherent mystical potential, expanding upon previous portrayals of the character that showcased his magical abilities. Furthermore, this revised backstory establishes a biological connection between Ocean Master and Aquaman, as they are revealed to be half-brothers through their shared parent, Atlan.

==== Aquaman: Time and Tide ====
Ocean Master appears as the main antagonist in the storyline "Aquaman: Time and Tide", where Aquaman chronicles his life experiences. While writing the book and reflecting on the past, Aquaman discovers a connection between Ocean Master's background and his own, leading him to realize that Ocean Master is his secret half-brother, as foretold by an ancient prophecy involving his biological father.

In the earliest chronologically depicted story from Ocean Master's youth, Aquaman encounters a young Inupiat woman whom he rescues from a polar bear attack. Among her family members is Orm Marius, an Inupiat who is considered an outcast by his tradition-bound family due to his nonconformist beliefs and his perception of their primitiveness. Orm believes that his mother holds a deep-seated hatred towards him. Although she claims that he is the son of an "underwater wizard," Orm dismisses this notion. Orm encounters a young Arthur Curry (Aquaman), whom he dislikes because Arthur has gained favor with the same family that rejected him. In a fit of jealousy, Orm attacks Kako, the woman, after discovering her intimate encounter with Arthur. While Kako survives the attack, she cannot recall the identity of her assailant. Arthur is cast out from the family home when they discover his confrontation with Nuliajuk, a revered deity, believing that Arthur's actions would bring a curse upon them for taking him in.

In another story set some time after the encounter with the Inupiat tribe, Aquaman encounters Orm once again, this time as "Ocean Master." Orm attempts to challenge and assassinate Aquaman but is easily defeated and spared by Arthur, who feels both pity for Orm's methods and an inability to deliver a more severe punishment for unknown reasons. Later, Atlantis falls under attack from Ocean Master's forces, and Aquaman and Aqualad intercept the assault but fall into a trap. While Ocean Master expresses his deep-seated hatred for Aquaman, he also reveals himself as the assailant who attacked Kako. In a moment of rage, Aquaman frees himself but is then distracted by Mera's attack, causing Ocean Master, Mera, and Aqualad to escape during the ensuing chaos triggered by the ship's self-destruct sequence.

==== JLA: Our Worlds At War ====
Ocean Master clashes with the JLA again when he attempts to claim the remains of Atlantis following Aquaman's apparent death in the 2001 storyline "Our Worlds at War".

==== Aquaman: To Serve and Protect ====
Ocean Master would later appear as one of the antagonists in the "To Serve and Protect" storyline in the sixth Aquaman title, having used his mystical talents to alter reality so that he was Aquaman and Orin was Ocean Master, using a spell with the bones of Aquaman's lost hand as a focus. As Aquaman, Orm holds Sub Diego under his evil rule, restricting the city's growth by claiming that the surface world had been destroyed by the attack that sunk the city. However, Arthur is able to defeat his brother's plot, thanks to Doctor Geist, the scientist who had turned Sub Diego's population into water-breathers. Geist had studied Aquaman extensively and was unaffected by the spell as Orm did not know he even existed, Arthur having faked Geist's death so that he could work on reversing what he had done. Geist is able to provide Arthur with enough details of the real world to find the source of Orm's power and destroy it.

==== Infinite Crisis ====
In the 2005–2006 storyline "Infinite Crisis", Ocean Master becomes a member of the Secret Society of Super Villains.

==== Final Crisis ====
In the 2008–2009 storyline "Final Crisis", Ocean Master is placed on the new Society's inner circle by Libra.

==== Aquaman: Sword of Atlantis ====
In the series Aquaman: Sword of Atlantis, Ocean Master enslaves the Atlanteans who survived the Spectre's destruction of Atlantis, and is using them to mine industrial materials for the surface world.

=== The New 52 ===
In The New 52, DC Comics' relaunch of all of its monthly titles and the rebooting of the DC Universe continuity, Ocean Master's origins are once again revised. Unlike previous depictions of the character, Orm is cast as a full-blooded Atlantean and is initially characterized as having genuinely, brotherly love for Arthur and holds disdain towards "surface dwellers" for their acts that have polluted the oceans for thousands of years and prefers not sharing the Earth with them. Despite inclinations to attack the "surface dwellers" for perceived crimes towards the ocean, Orm instead rules for the benefit of his people and adheres to a code of conduct.

==== Origin ====
Orm was born as the second son of Queen Atlanna, making him the younger half-brother of Arthur Curry. After Atlanna has Arthur with a human male, Tom Curry, she gives up the child and allows him to raise their son. Atlanna is forced to return to Atlantis and to marry a member of her royal guard, with Orm the result of the union. As a child, Orm was told stories of terrors of humans ("surface dwellers") and how he had a half-brother on the surface. Saddened, he begged for the Atlantean guard to rescue him but was denied, inspiring him to take the throne to one day "rescue" his brother.

Twelve years later, Orm inherited the throne after mysterious circumstances after the deaths of his father and mother days apart, the former assumed to be killed by his enemies and the latter accused of being killed by Orm himself by royal advisor Nuidis Vulko. Failing to produce evidence, Vulko escapes and plots to overthrow Orm by placing Arthur on the throne. When Vulko is confronted by Arthur (who is searching for Atlantis), he explains his brother's origins and tells him that Arthur is the rightful heir of Atlantis's throne, and therefore, must overthrow Orm, whom he claims to be corrupt ruler.

When the brothers meet, Aquaman assumes the throne. However, he abdicates it to Orm once more to live out his life as Aquaman under the promise that Orm does not attack the surface.

==== Aquaman: The Others ====
Aquaman suspects Orm to be the Atlantean who hired Black Manta to steal Aquaman's scepter, which is an Atlantean relic of great power that was taken from the Dead King's tomb. When the Atlantean retrieves the relic, Aquaman believes Orm is in the Atlantean ship and demands that he reveal himself, but the Atlantean ship escapes. Later, Orm is visited by Aquaman to ask if he took the scepter, but Orm says that he did not, saying that if he wanted the relic scepter he would ask Aquaman for it.

==== Justice League: Throne of Atlantis ====
During the 2012 "Throne of Atlantis" storyline, someone sabotages an aircraft carrier and provokes it into attacking Atlantis. Believing to be under attack from the surface, Orm leads Atlantean soldiers to invade the carrier and then wage war on the surface. Orm arrives in Boston, attacking seafarers and asking for his brother, Aquaman. Aquaman confronts Orm and attempts to talk sense to him, but they are interrupted by the Justice League without warning. Aquaman defends his brother, refusing to have him face extradition. Attacked on multiple fronts, Orm electrocutes then imprisons the Justice League within water cocoons. He sends the Justice League to the abyssal plain, while he attempts to sink the city of Boston. While Orm and his Atlantean soldiers plant bombs in an attempt to sink the city and face off against the superheroes that Cyborg called in as reserves, they are attacked by a race of sea creatures known as the Trench. After the Justice League escape from the abyssal plain, Aquaman realizes Orm is not using the relic scepter to sink the city. Since the Trench can only be commanded with the relic scepter, someone else must be using it to manipulate the Atlantean war. The mastermind is revealed to be Vulko. The Justice League arrive to battle both the Atlanteans and the Trench, while Aquaman attacks his brother and tries to convince him that Vulko is responsible for the Atlantean war. However, Orm refuses to listen, believing that Aquaman has been corrupted by the surface world. The Justice League manage to dispose of all the bomb detonators in Boston, but Orm tries to use his control helmet to summon a tidal wave. Mera's power turns the wave to hard water to stop it. Orm is defeated by Aquaman, who reclaims the throne and takes command of the deceived Atlantean soldiers. The Trench are returned home and Vulko is taken in for an Atlantean trial. However, Orm is remanded to Belle Reve for his crimes after abdicating the throne and losing political immunity in the process. As he is taken away, Aquaman apologizes to his brother.

Murk, a renegade Atlantean, makes plans to break Orm - now known by the media as the "Ocean Master" (a name he despises) - out of Belle Reve. While in prison, Orm is advised by his lawyer that he must plead guilty to the criminal charges against him. Murk and other Atlanteans arrive to free Orm, but return home when they receive a message that Atlantis is under attack.

==== Forever Evil ====
During the 2013 "Forever Evil" storyline, Deathstorm and Power Ring invade Belle Reve, killing Orm's lawyer. During Belle Reve's prison break, Orm walks out to reclaim his Atlantean garb when a critically wounded prison officer begs for help; seeing that this officer was the only one who showed him any kindness, Orm kills him to end his suffering. He then runs into fellow escapees who are attacking a small-town diner, and whilst he is initially not bothered about confronting them, once they turn their attentions to him, he takes them out. A diner employee named Erin desperately pleads with Orm to save her young son Tommy, but he refuses, instead heading back to the ocean. However, he changes his mind, going back midway through his path to save him.

In the aftermath of the attack, Orm now lives with Erin and Tommy, entertaining the latter with stories of Atlantis. Suddenly, Orm is confronted by King Nereus from Xebel who has found the other four kingdoms. Nereus offers him the opportunity to join him to allow the kings of the Seven Seas to rule Earth once more.

==== Aquaman: Maelstrom ====
Although Ocean Master did not appear, it is revealed that Orm was not responsible for his mother death; after Atlanna slew her husband for claiming to kill Arthur, she faked her death and abandoned Orm, leaving him to the inherit the throne. When Arthur met her and gave her an artifact that will allow Atlantis to officially recognize him as the true sovereign of Atlantis, she urged her elder son not to reveal her true whereabouts to Orm, intending to confront him herself when she is ready.

=== DC Universe (2017-) ===
Eventually, Ocean Master re-emerges with a new status quo; now depicted as a reformed super-villain having given up his former life to live on dry land with Erin and Tommy, he is conflicted between the safety of Atlantis and his envious-driven yearning to overthrow his rival and brother, Aquaman.

==== Mera: Queen of Atlantis ====
Orm returns in the miniseries Mera: Queen of Atlantis. At the start of the series, he is shown to be engaged to Erin and views Tommy as his son, having decided to leave Arthur to rule Atlantis and settle down with his new family. However, when he learns that his brother has been deposed by the usurper Courm Rath and is now presumed dead, Orm silently leaves Erin and Tommy in the middle of the night, feeling duty bound to reassert his claim to the throne. This brings him into conflict with Mera, whom the power brokers of Atlantis have selected to replace Rath, and his sister Tula, who is now a close ally of Arthur and Mera. Mera defeats Orm and has him imprisoned.

==== Justice League/Aquaman: Drowned Earth ====
In the "Drowned Earth" crossover event, when all the inhabitants of Atlantis besides the two of them are transformed into monsters by tainted waters released by a trio of alien sea gods. He leads her to a hidden chamber where an ancient artifact called the Clarion which could repel the invasion is stored, but is himself transformed by the waters.

==== Ocean Master: Year of the Villain ====
Orm appears in a one-shot special as part of the Year of the Villain crossover event. Following Drowned Earth, Orm hid as a beggar on the streets of the Ninth Tride, Atlantis' poorest district and closest to the sea floor. Still considered a wanted criminal by Mera's regime and unable to escape the city due to impenetrable guard patrols which he himself designed, Orm wandered the streets, bitter from the feeling that despite sacrificing everything for Atlantis, it neither needed nor wanted him. Orm would learn of a surface king by the name of Dagon who controlled a powerful ocean elemental through an amulet. Later that night, a mad beggar heard the same elemental and would make his escape with Orm following him, learning of a security flaw in Atlantis. Once free, he witnessed someone take the beggar and followed them to a rig where he encountered one of Aquaman's foes, the Marine Maruder, and learned of her new abilities of manipulating the bodies of marine life courtesy of Lex Luthor. He escapes and saves the beggar, who then leads him to where he hears the call of the ocean elemental from the story of King Dagon. Orm manages to find the ocean elemental from the stories after venturing in the deep ocean to the point even an Atlantean body struggled from the pressure. Introducing herself as Lernaea, she frees Orm from the deeper depths of the ocean. Orm would go back to slay the Marine Maruder for her transgressions against the Atlantean she abducted and fed her body to his newfound followers, christening them citizens of the "City of Dagon". King once more, he is visited by Lex Luthor and is offered the chance to gain power through him. Orm rejects his offer and frees the Lernaea, who chooses to freely follow Orm, before threatening Luthor to stay out of his oceans. Orm then visits Erin and relays the whole story to her, explaining his whereabouts since he last seen them. Due to his choices in choosing his life as Ocean Master and Atlantis over them, Erin breaks up with Orm though he relents that despite all matters, he considered Tommy his son and will approach him when he is older and give him the option of being his heir before leaving her. Now backed by Atlantean outcasts from the homeless population of the Ninth Tride and the Lernaea from loyalty, Orm officially christens himself king of Dagon.

==== Aquaman: Manta vs Machine ====
As Atlantis is in a state of disarray due to Mera being in a coma from a battle with Black Manta and his new weapon and Vulko proving an unpopular impromptu ruler among Atlantean citizens, Orm visits the Atlantean house of healing where Mera is staying in and is present when Aquaman and Mera's daughter, Andrina (nicknamed Andy), is born.

==== Aquaman: Echoes of a Life Lived Well ====
Months after the birth of Andy, Orm began undermining Mera and her council's rule using his status as king of Dagon with the intent of establishing Dagon a new city-state capital by ushering in several tactical gambits; he manipulates the poorer populace of the Ninth Tride in his growing army, begins winning support from other kingdoms, and manipulates his brother by having Lernaea abduct Andy and hidden away to expose the more dangerous and terrifying side of his brother's personality to stow the question of having a possible ruler who can be considered easily provoked. He later attends the wedding between Mera and Vulko, the latter chosen as part of Mera's own contingency plans to ensure no one else besides someone she trusts can take reign and power, and denounces the idea of Vulko marrying a comatose woman in an attempt to gain power in front of other representatives of the other six kingdoms. When Mera reveals herself to be conscious and intends to bring an end of Atlantean monarchy, his Dagoian forces attack Atlantis with intent to bring down Mera and her rule. Eventually, Aquaman challenges Orm into battle in which either Orm conforms to Mera's act to end Atlantean monarchy or Orm assumes the throne once more. During the battle, Orm cheats and injures Aquaman with his trident. In return, Aquaman calls upon the Justice League, the Sea Gods of the World, and other allies. The battle is interrupted by Dolphin and Orm's second-in-command, Pilot, in which both exposes him as the mastermind behind Andy's kidnapping and his intent in using the Dagoian forces he cultivated in a bid for power. With Lernaea renouncing her loyalty to Orm and himself disgraced and defeated once again, he concedes to the dissolution of the Atlantean monarchy. Although he was seemingly captured, Ocean Master is later revealed to be free.

==== Aquamen and other titles ====
In Aquaman/Green Arrow: Deep Target, time-altering events instead cast him as an enemy of Oliver Queen in flashbacks, whose life was switched with Aquaman. Within the first upheavals of the timeline changes in an attempt to create the original timeline, Ocean Master is instead portrayed far more friendly to his brother Aquaman, the two agreeing to rule as brother-kings and sharing their birthright. When the original timeline is later restored, Ocean Master is once more Aquaman's enemy and their mother, Atlanna, is revealed to have died.

In the Aquamen series, Ocean Master appears as one of the chief antagonists in the book; he attacks a United Nations embassy and attempting to kidnap an Atlantean ambassador before being stopped by Aquaman and arrested by Atlantean authorities. As Jackson Hyde's patience with Arthur is tested due to the intervention of Black Manta on Arthur's behest, he calls a secret meeting of the Aquaman Family and requests an expert on Atlantean biology (revealed to be Stephen Shin). The Aquaman Family learn that a series of events unfolding on the surface references an oil spill that killed Atlanteans in the past. Jackson seeks out Orm, who is in an Atlantean maximum security prison, to learn more about the conspiracy. Orm relents, but leads Jackson into a trap with the Scavenger in Gotham, who has undergone upgrades and is revealed to be a co-conspirator alongside Orm, as he freed him from Atlantean prison and has him as an accomplice.

== Characterization ==
=== Personality and themes ===
"His character trait of how angry he is, that's something that's throughout the comics. He was an angry boy. He always was angry. He's angry at Arthur. He's angry for Arthur not being there. He's resentful of that. He's angry probably at his father and the relationship that he and his mother had. He's bottled up all of his family turmoil and it manifests itself out through violence like a lot of bad people will do, but I don't look at him as bad. I certainly look at him as troubled and I can look at some of his actions as irrational or reprehensible. But he's justifiably angry and I'd be hard pressed to find someone who doesn't think that we're ruining the oceans. We need to take better care of our world."

— Patrick Wilson

While having been depicted as both a super-villain and more akin to an anti-hero, Ocean Master is typically characterized as a ruthless and blood-thirsty and a contrast to Aquaman, being less noble and charitable as well as envious of his brother. However, various stories following the New 52 vary his leadership; some stories showcased him as a militant but fair and benevolent ruler whose outlook as a tyrant was shaped by Vulko's manipulation, whom believed a young Orm conspired to kill his mother for the throne despite lacking evidence. Subsequent storylines would reveal his innocence and a temporary alteration of the mainstream timeline of showcased a possibility of Orm opting for him and Aquaman ruling as brothers-kings. Other stories would instead characterize him as manipulative and tyrannical in a position of power.

According to Geoff Johns, Johns opined that he does not view Orm (prior to being known as Ocean Master) as a malicious super-villain, characterizing him as someone doing what he believes is best for the Atlantean people and does not quite hate his brother, Arthur. Like many of his fellow people, he shares a bizarre perspective on the "surface world" and has a pride and culture different from the "surface". John's intent for the character included exploring the character in a different manner compared to traditional super-villains such as Sinestro or Black Hand. In an interview regarding his role as Ocean Master in Aquaman, Patrick Wilson stated that he does not view the character as a villain; while considering him a villain in comic book lore as a foil and antagonist, Wilson opined that he is "rooted" in an understandable dilemma of being angry at the pollution and destruction of the ocean. He further speaks upon the character's trait of being angry consistent throughout the character's existence and believes the character's actions of being irrational or reprehensible while believing the character to being justifiable in his anger.

=== Reputation ===
A formidable super-villain, Ocean Master is cited as one of Earth's most dangerous individuals and rated "Alpha-class" by the Justice League. This particular classification is shared by numerous other superpowered metahumans in the DC Universe, including Black Adam, Guy Gardner, and Mary Marvel.

== Powers and abilities ==
=== Original version ===
As a non-metahuman pirate, he was an expert in tactics, nautical knowledge, and formidable hand-to-hand combat skills, allowing him to hold his own against most human opponents. Ocean Master frequently stolen utilized advanced technologies, such as his helmet and battle armor. The helmet featured gill functionality, enabling him to survive underwater for extended periods and endure the intense pressures of the ocean depths. He possessed other technologies such as harpoon guns, submarines, sonic weaponry, nets, and lasers. When retroactively revealed as a descendant of ancient Atlanteans, he possessed a hybrid nature that granted him mystical potential. Acquiring knowledge and capability with the mystic arts drawn from an era associated with one of the most influential mystics in Atlantean history, this granted him numerous magical abilities including superhuman strength, the capability to breathe underwater indefinitely, teleportation, illusion casting, and the power to summon magical creatures from the depths of the ocean to aid him.

His abilities were further augmented by his magical trident and allows him to discharge mystic energies. The full extent of its capabilities remains unknown. Additionally, the trident enables Ocean Master to breathe underwater indefinitely, similar to the function of his special helmet. Orm also once possessed the Zodiac Crystals, bolstering his magical abilities to a much higher degree.

=== Current version ===
As a royal-blooded Atlantean, he possess his race's shared attributes at a higher level: he is able to breathe underwater indefinitely, possesses superhuman strength that allows him to freely move underwater and withstand the pressures of the deep ocean, superhuman speed, superhuman durability, and enhanced senses that enable several abilities such as being able to see deep within the depths of the ocean. Although he hasn't explicitly exhibited magical powers, references to select storylines in current continuity implies he possess powers similar to past depictions. Ocean Master is also as a highly skilled warrior, having honed his abilities at a young age and is regarded as a superior fighter compared to the average human with similar training. He also has a genius-level intellect with knowledge in fields including politics, military operation, medicine, and leadership, able to establish his own nation, command military forces, and is comparable to medical specialists in Atlantis.

He can utilize several magical artifacts and typically carries his headgear (crown) that grants him the ability to manipulate water in similar to inherent hydrokinetic powers and a powerful trident of ancient Atlantean origin comparable to the Trident of Poseidon which grants control over weather patterns, the ocean, the magnetic field. He also has access to advanced technology.

=== Weaknesses ===
In his original version, Ocean Master experienced excruciating nerve pain when he separated himself from the magical trident given to him by Neron. The current version, due to his Atlantean biology, dehydrates at an accelerated rate compared to humans, gradually making him weaker when spending prolonged periods on the surface without regular hydration.

== Other versions ==
- An alternate universe version of Ocean Master appears in Flashpoint.
- An alternate universe version of Ocean Master appears in Batman and the Justice League Manga with a similar history to his New 52 version. This version can manipulate the mystical energy originating from the Ley lines, granting him immense magical powers and enhanced physical abilities. He later reforms after seeing Aquaman's past and helps him and Batman stop Ankorou from destroying Gotham City.

== In other media ==
=== Television ===
- Orm appears in the Justice League episode "The Enemy Below", voiced by Richard Green. This version is a lord of the Atlantean royal court who attempts to manipulate Aquaman into declaring war on the surface world. He leads a rebellious faction of the Atlantean army to dispose of Aquaman and attempts to flood Earth, only to be killed in a fight with Aquaman.
- Ocean Master appears in the Batman: The Brave and the Bold episode "Evil Under the Sea!", voiced by Wallace Langham.
- Ocean Master appears in Young Justice, voiced by Roger Craig Smith. This version is a leading member of the Light before being imprisoned, replaced by Black Manta, and killed by Lady Shiva. In the fourth season, the Light has Ocean Master's memory engrams implanted into two clones, one of Ocean Master and the other of Arion, in a plot to take over Atlantis. However, the Lords of Order kill Arion while Ocean Master's clone is made to realize his true nature and set free by Aquaman as he cannot be held responsible for the original's crimes.
- Ocean Master appears in Aquaman: King of Atlantis, voiced by Dana Snyder.
- Ocean Master appears in the Harley Quinn episode "Another Sharkley Adventure", voiced by Alan Tudyk.
  - Ocean Master appears again in Kite Man: Hell Yeah!, voiced again by Tudyk. At this point he was joined the Legion of Doom.

=== Film ===
Patrick Wilson as King Orm Marius / Ocean Master in Aquaman (2018).

- The Flashpoint incarnation of Ocean Master appears in Justice League: The Flashpoint Paradox, voiced by an uncredited James Patrick Stuart. This version loyally serves Aquaman until he is killed by the Amazons.
- Ocean Master appears in the post-credits scene of Justice League: War, voiced by an uncredited Steve Blum.
- Ocean Master appears in Justice League: Throne of Atlantis, voiced by Sam Witwer.
- Ocean Master appears in Lego DC Comics Super Heroes: Aquaman – Rage of Atlantis, voiced by Trevor Devall.
- Orm Marius / Ocean Master appears in the DC Extended Universe (DCEU) films Aquaman (2018) and Aquaman and the Lost Kingdom (2023), portrayed by Patrick Wilson.

=== Video games ===
- Ocean Master appears in Aquaman: Battle for Atlantis.
- Ocean Master appears as a boss in the Nintendo DS version of Batman: The Brave and the Bold – The Videogame.
- Ocean Master appears in DC Universe Online, voiced by Sandy McIlree.
- Ocean Master appears as a boss and character summon in Scribblenauts Unmasked: A DC Comics Adventure.
- Ocean Master appears as a playable character in DC Unchained.
- Ocean Master appears in DC Legends.
- Ocean Master appears as a playable character in Lego DC Super-Villains.

=== Miscellaneous ===
Ocean Master appears in the Young Justice animated series' tie-in comic, in which he is revealed further to be an Atlantean supremacist who believes Atlanteans with human-like appearances are superior to those biologically adapted to the sea.

=== Merchandise ===
- Several collectibles of the DCEU incarnation of Ocean Master were released, including a 6' DC Multiverse figure by Mattel and a Pop! Vinyl statue by Funko.
- Ocean Master, based on his DC Rebirth design, received a mini-figure in a 2019 Lego Batman set.
