= Stephen Shin =

Fictional DC character

Publication information
- Publisher: DC Comics
- First appearance: Aquaman (vol. 7) #2 (December 2011)
- Created by: Geoff Johns; Ivan Reis

In-story information
- Species: Human
- Abilities: Genius-level intellect

Stephen Shin is a fictional character appearing in comic books published by DC Comics. He is a supporting character of Aquaman who debuted during "The New 52" reboot. Stephen Shin first appeared in Aquaman (vol. 7) #2 (December 2011) and was created by Geoff Johns and Ivan Reis.

Shin appears in the DC Extended Universe films Aquaman and Aquaman and the Lost Kingdom, portrayed by Randall Park.

== Fictional character biography ==
Stephen Shin is a marine biologist who befriends lighthouse keeper Thomas Curry and his son with the sea-dwelling Atlanna, Arthur Curry, the future Aquaman. He has more knowledge of Atlantis than any other surface-dweller. Shin helps Arthur develop his powers, but turns on his protege when he refuses to reveal the location of Atlantis.

Some years later, Aquaman and Mera visit Shin, asking for his help to identify strange sea creatures. He does, but is angered when Aquaman refuses to let him keep one.

Aquaman and Mera visit Stephen Shin to see if he can help figure out the Atlantean artifact that they have and if he knows of the identity of the person who sank Atlantis. Shin states that it was possible for someone to sink Atlantis and mentions that it has enemies due to it being the most powerful civilization in the world. A woman named Ya'Wara breaks into Shin's house to kill him, only for Mera to take action. When Aquaman breaks up the fight, Ya'Wara tells him that Black Manta killed Kahina, took the gold seal that she had, and believed Shin told Black Manta about it.

As Ya'Wara believes that Shin is in league with Black Manta, Aquaman says that they need him to find the missing relics as Aquaman has Shin start looking. He warns Shin that if he is in any way connected to Kahina's death, he will allow Ya'Wara to feed him to her pet jaguar. Shin returns to work on the Atlantean black box as Mera asks him about Black Manta and what he knows about the Others.

Shin explains that he met Thomas Curry and his son Arthur years ago when Thomas saved his life during an expedition that went awry. Shin later encountered a treasure hunter who had been shipwrecked off the coast of Iceland and had fought off a group of pirates. Mera believes the treasure hunter to have been Black Manta, which Shin confirms. It is revealed that Aquaman inadvertently killed Black Manta's father Jesse while attacking his boat years prior.

When Black Manta arrives to abduct Stephen Shin, Mera fights him until Black Manta stuns Mera and teleports away with Shin. Black Manta tries to get Shin to help him access King Atlan's tomb. Shin declines, refusing to betray Aquaman again; he had previously revealed Aquaman's existence to the public.

Stephen Shin is later seen in the underwater Triton Base while Aquaman is fighting a sea monster called the Karaqan. When a diver named Coombs is attacked by sharks and saved by Aquaman, Shin brings him to the Triton Base for treatment. Coombs is experimented on by Dr. Edrid Orson and given shapeshifting abilities, which he primarily uses to assume the abilities of aquatic animals.

== Powers and abilities ==
Stephen Shin has genius-level intellect.

== In other media ==
- Stephen Shin appears in Justice League: Throne of Atlantis, voiced by Matthew Yang King.
- An alternate universe version of Stephen Shin appears in Justice League: Gods and Monsters. This version is a member of Project Fair Play, a contingency program developed to counter the Justice League if necessary, before being killed by the Metal Men.
- Stephen Shin appears in films set in the DC Extended Universe (DCEU), portrayed by Randall Park.
  - Introduced in Aquaman (2018), this version is a former United States Institute of Marine Science officer who was fired for making perceived conspiracy theories about Atlantis and claiming that they are plotting to attack the surface world. In a mid-credits scene, he rescues Black Manta. While nursing him back to health, Shin realizes Manta's suit is made from Atlantean technology. Manta agrees to tell him how he received it in exchange for Shin helping him find Aquaman.
  - Shin appears in Aquaman and the Lost Kingdom. He works with Manta to find Atlantean artifacts and the lost Atlantean kingdom of Necrus, where the latter finds the cursed Black Trident. Eventually, Shin realizes Manta's motives and helps Aquaman and Orm Marius stop him from destroying Atlantis and the world.
- Stephen Shin appears as a character summon in Scribblenauts Unmasked: A DC Comics Adventure.
