= Justice League: Throne of Atlantis =

2015 American film directed by Ethan Spaulding

- Home video release cover art
- Directed by: Ethan Spaulding
- Written by: Heath Corson
- Based on: Throne of Atlantis by Geoff Johns; Paul Pelletier; Ivan Reis
- Produced by: James Tucker
- Starring: Rosario Dawson; Nathan Fillion; Christopher Gorham; Matt Lanter; Jason O'Mara
- Edited by: Christopher D. Lozinski
- Music by: Frederik Wiedmann
- Production companies: Warner Bros. Animation; DC Entertainment; MOI Animation (animation services)
- Distributed by: Warner Home Video
- Release dates: January 13, 2015 (digital); January 27, 2015 (physical)
- Running time: 72 minutes
- Country: United States
- Language: English
- Budget: $3.5 million

Justice League: Throne of Atlantis is a 2015 American direct-to-video animated superhero film featuring the DC Comics superhero team the Justice League, which is the 22nd film of the DC Universe Animated Original Movies and the fourth film in the DC Animated Movie Universe. The film is loosely based on the "Throne of Atlantis" story arc from The New 52 written by Geoff Johns and serves as a standalone sequel to 2014's Justice League: War. In the film, Arthur Curry, a half-Atlantean prince, discovers his heritage and aids the Justice League in preventing a war between the surface dwellers and the Atlanteans orchestrated by his half-brother Ocean Master. The film was released for download on January 13, 2015 and was released on Blu-ray and DVD formats on January 27.

Jason O'Mara, Christopher Gorham, Sean Astin, Shemar Moore, Steven Blum, George Newbern, and Melique Berger reprise their respective roles from Justice League: War, while Nathan Fillion reprises his role as Green Lantern / Hal Jordan from Green Lantern: Emerald Knights, Justice League: Doom and Justice League: The Flashpoint Paradox.

== Plot ==
While on patrol in the Atlantic, the entire crew of the nuclear submarine USS California is killed by an unknown attacker. At S.T.A.R. Labs, the Justice League's headquarters, Cyborg is given the news by Colonel Steve Trevor. He teleports to the sub via a Boom Tube, finds hand prints on the hull and discovers that nuclear missiles are missing. Cyborg, Flash, Shazam, Superman, Wonder Woman, Green Lantern, and Batman inspect the recovered California. Diana identifies the enemy as warriors from Atlantis, beings turned into underwater creatures by their king's mystical trident. Batman and Superman decide to meet Atlantis-expert Stephen Shin.

In Atlantis, Prince Orm and Black Manta meet with Orm's mother Queen Atlanna, where they argue over declaring war on the humans. Orm blames the Justice League for his father's death while Queen Atlanna blames Darkseid. (Note: As depicted in Justice League: War (2014).) Orm wishes to attack first, but Atlanna silences him and asks Mera to bring Arthur Curry (her other son) to Atlantis. Black Manta uses a craft disguised as a Navy submarine to attack Atlantis using the stolen missiles to frame the humans. Batman and Superman locate Shin's home and his destroyed research. Superman finds a photograph of Curry and a letter revealing that Arthur is half-Atlantean. Shin meets Arthur, but he is killed by Atlantean soldiers sent by Black Manta. Arthur is blasted out of his collapsing house. Mera saves him and dispatches the soldiers using her hydrokinetic powers.

Citizens of Atlantis and Orm demand war following the attack on Atlantis, though Atlanna disagrees. Arthur wakes up underwater in Atlantean ruins. Mera explains that Atlanna is his mother, though as a royal, Atlanna could not be with his father or Arthur. Now, Atlanna believes Arthur can help bridge the gap between the two worlds. Mera dresses him in the king's royal garb, though Arthur leaves wearing only the orange and green Atlantean bodysuit. They are attacked by the Trench at the surface. The creatures overwhelm Arthur and the League helps defeat the Trenchers. Black Manta reports to Orm that the Trench failed to kill Arthur.

When Orm and Atlanna argue over starting a war, she reveals that she knows he attacked Atlantis. Orm stabs her to death from behind and takes over as the new king of Atlantis. Superman, Wonder Woman, Green Lantern, Cyborg, Arthur, and Mera learn of Atlanna's death once in Atlantis. Orm (now using the mantle "Ocean Master") uses the trident to restrain the team in pods. The group is sent to be consumed by the monstrous Dark Trench while Ocean Master leads Atlantis' army to the surface. Arthur taps into the power of the trident to destroy his pod. With Superman's help, they save the rest and defeat the monster. A massive tidal wave conceals the Atlantean army's arrival in Metropolis. Superman saves John Henry Irons and Wonder Woman saves Lois Lane and Jimmy Olsen. Black Manta attacks Arthur and reveals that he wants to overthrow Ocean Master to take Atlantis for himself. Arthur summons a shark to attack him.

The League and Mera battle Ocean Master, with little success. Shazam is transformed back into Billy Batson, Flash, Green Lantern, and Mera are knocked unconscious, and Cyborg is almost impaled, electrocuted and disabled. Wonder Woman is incapacitated by the trident's electric energy while Superman is wounded because of its mystical properties. Batman saves Cyborg from dying by electrocuting him with a taser device. Ocean Master is about to kill Arthur when Cyborg broadcasts the video of Ocean Master confessing to his mother's murder for Atlantis' soldiers to hear. Arthur uses the distraction to defeat Ocean Master and convinces the soldiers to stand down and accept him as their king.

Arthur is crowned king of Atlantis with the Justice League in the audience. Batman suggests that they need to solidify the team, given the new threats, and Cyborg reveals plans for a watchtower. Arthur joins the League as Aquaman despite his dislike toward the name, before leaving with Mera to confront the Trenchers.

In the post-credits, Orm is incarcerated at Belle Reve and approached by Lex Luthor who has a proposition for him to consider.

== Voice cast ==
Voice actor	Character
Matt Lanter	King Orin / Arthur Curry / Aquaman
Sumalee Montano	Mera
Sam Witwer	Orm / Ocean Master
Sirena Irwin	Atlanna
Jason O'Mara	Bruce Wayne / Batman
Jerry O'Connell	Kal-El / Clark Kent / Superman
Rosario Dawson	Diana Prince / Wonder Woman
Christopher Gorham	Barry Allen / Flash
Nathan Fillion	Hal Jordan / Green Lantern
Shemar Moore	Victor Stone / Cyborg
Juliet Landau	Lois Lane
Sean Astin	Billy Batson / Shazam
Harry Lennix	David Hyde / Black Manta
George Newbern	Steve Trevor
Melique Berger	Sarah Charles
Steve Blum	Lex Luthor
Patrick Cavanaugh	Jimmy Olsen
Larry Cedar	Thomas Curry
Jay K. Johnson	Sam Lane
Matthew Yang King	Stephen Shin
Khary Payton	John Henry Irons
Barry Dennen	Defense Advisor
Paul Eiding	Captain
DJ Price	Young Arthur
Andrea Romano	Elderly Atlantean woman
Michael Rosenbaum	Drift Leader
Cedric Yarbrough	Submarine Technician

== Crew ==
- Andrea Romano – Voice director
- Sam Register – Executive producer

== Reception ==
=== Critical reception ===
The review aggregator Rotten Tomatoes reported an approval rating of 57%, with an average rating of 5.3/10, based on 7 reviews.

Scott Mendelson of Forbes felt that the film retrod old ground with Aquaman's origin story and paled in comparison to the Justice League episode "The Enemy Below", which featured a similar plot. Although praising "the choice to center on Aquaman as opposed to yet-another Batman-centric story", he overall felt "that Aquaman [was] the least interesting character in his own movie". IGN gave the film a 6.5/10 rating and stated that the film "falters in its second half, delivering an only somewhat enjoyable Aquaman movie".

For ToonZone.net, reviewer Ed Liu segregated his review into two sections: one for the "good news" and one for the opposite. For the positive, Liu said that "the quality of the animation is a nice cut above nearly all TV animation and falls just short of feature film levels", and praised the voice cast. For the bad, Liu said that "it's mostly downhill from there", referring to the flimsy motivations of the villain, the inconsistencies with the characters and the plot and the unnecessary inclusion of the Justice League. Brian Lowry of Variety gave the film a relatively positive review, stating that DC Universe Animated Original Movies "remain an area where DC consistently outclasses Marvel" and that "entries like Throne of Atlantis reinforce a sense that in the game of animation, anyway, they're leading the wave, not behind it".

=== Sales ===
Justice League: Throne of Atlantis has earned $4,636,124 in domestic home video sales.

== See also ==
- List of underwater science fiction works
