= Aquaman: King of Atlantis =

American animated superhero miniseries

- Genre: Action-adventure; Comedy; Science fantasy; Superhero
- Based on: Aquaman by: Paul Norris; Mort Weisinger
- Developed by: Victor Courtright; Marly Halpern-Graser
- Directed by: Keith Pakiz
- Starring: Cooper Andrews; Gillian Jacobs; Thomas Lennon; Dana Snyder
- Composer: Matthew Janszen
- Country of origin: United States
- Original language: English
- No. of episodes: 3

Production
- Executive producers: James Wan; Michael Clear; Rob Hackett; Sam Register
- Running time: 45 minutes
- Production companies: Atomic Monster; DC Entertainment; Warner Bros. Animation

Original release
- Network: HBO Max; Cartoon Network
- Release: October 14 – October 28, 2021

Aquaman: King of Atlantis is an American animated superhero comedy television miniseries produced by James Wan for the streaming service HBO Max, based on the DC Comics character Aquaman. The series is produced by Atomic Monster, DC Entertainment and Warner Bros. Animation. It is set after the events of Wan's 2018 DC Extended Universe (DCEU) film Aquaman, but is not canonical to the DCEU.

The miniseries began on October 14, 2021, and subsequent episodes were released on a weekly basis. It also aired as a feature-length film on Cartoon Network on May 14, 2022; the movie version was later released on DVD on June 21. It was originally set to air as part of the ACME Night block.

The miniseries was removed from HBO Max in August 2022.

== Premise ==
Alongside trusted allies Mera and Nuidis Vulko, King Aquaman of Atlantis faces unscrupulous surface dwellers, ancient evils from beyond time, and his half-brother's attempts to overthrow him. Aquaman is trying to prove that he is the right man for the throne.

== Voice cast ==
=== Main ===
- Cooper Andrews as Aquaman
- Gillian Jacobs as Mera
- Thomas Lennon as Nuidis Vulko
- Dana Snyder as Ocean Master
  - Snyder also voices Robot Hands in Chapter 1
- Andrew Morgado as Petyr Mortikov

=== Recurring ===
- Chris Jai Alex as Toby (Chapter 1), Atlantean Guard (Chapter 2), Atlantean One (Chapter 3)
- Kevin Michael Richardson as Royal Announcer
  - Richardson also voices Orca in Chapter 1 & Chapter 3
- Flula Borg as Mantis (Chapter 1 & Chapter 3)
- Kimberly Brooks as Hammer (Chapter 1 & Chapter 3)
- Kaitlyn Robrock as Gillian, Merdussa (Chapter 1 & Chapter 3)
- Trevor Devall as Elderly Man (Chapter 2 & Chapter 3)
- Armen Taylor as Chef (Chapter 2 & Chapter 3)

=== Guest ===
- Robbie Daymond as Finhead (Chapter 1)
- Regi Davis as Fisherman, Primordeus (Chapter 2)
- Erica Ash as Wendy (Chapter 2)
- Laila Berzins as Boss Crab (Chapter 2)
- Erica Lindbeck as Peasant (Chapter 2)

== Episodes ==
No.	Title	Directed by	Written and storyboarded by	Original release date
1	"Chapter I: Dead Sea"	Keith Pakiz	Victor Courtright, Marly Halpern-Graser, Drew Applegate, Matt Bolinger, Roxann Cole, David Davis, Rose Feduk, Jack Kaiser McGee, Nora Meek and Marie Lum	October 14, 2021
On his first day as king of Atlantis, Aquaman must prove he's the right man for the job; luckily, Vulko is ready with just the right mission: investigating a distant outpost that no one has heard from in years.
2	"Chapter II: Primordeous"	Keith Pakiz	Victor Courtright, Marly Halpern-Graser, Bryan Condon, Drew Applegate, Matt Bolinger, Roxann Cole, David Davis, Rose Feduk, Jack Kaiser McGee, Nora Meek, Marie Lum	October 21, 2021
Aquaman's reputation is under attack, but no one in Atlantis is taking him seriously; to win his subjects over, he sets out on a journey that leads him straight into a horror-tinged mystery.
3	"Chapter III: Tidal Shift"	Keith Pakiz	Victor Courtright, Marly Halpern-Graser, Laura Streebny, Matt Bolinger, Roxann Cole, David Davis, Rose Feduk, Jack Kaiser McGee, Nora Meek, Marie Lum	October 28, 2021
Aquaman discovers the two crystals he acquired earlier warp the fabric of space and time, and could be used to destroy the world.

== Production ==
A three-part animated mini-series based on the DC Comics character Aquaman was announced in January 2020. James Wan, who directed the 2018 live-action film and its 2023 sequel, serves as executive producer. The miniseries premiered on HBO Max. The characters Mera, Nuidis Vulko, and Ocean Master also appear in the series. The series aired on Cartoon Network on May 14, 2022. It was originally going to air as part of the ACME Night block. Aquaman: King of Atlantis was released on October 14, 2021.
