= The Trench (comics) =

Fictional kingdom

Publication information
- Publisher: DC Comics
- First appearance: Aquaman (vol. 7) #1 (November 2011)
- Created by: Geoff Johns

The Trench is the name applied to both a fictional kingdom, and its inhabitants as a group, that escaped the destruction of Atlantis in DC Comics.

The Trench appears in the 2018 live-action DC Extended Universe film Aquaman.

== Publication history ==
The Trench first appeared in Aquaman (vol. 7) #1 (November 2011) and were created by Geoff Johns. In September 2011, The New 52 had rebooted DC's continuity. Johns introduced the Trench into this new timeline, making them antagonists in the Aquaman series.

== Fictional character biography ==
The Trench are cannibalistic, ocean-dwelling creatures who evolved in the depths of the ocean. After the Trench massacre a group of fishers, the police call in Aquaman and Mera to help investigate. Aquaman and Mera discover the Trench's base and uncover that they were only trying to gather food for the Trench queen's children. The Trench pursue Aquaman, who triggers a volcanic eruption that seals the entrance to the Trench's kingdom.

=== Dead King's Trident ===
Aquaman uses the Dead King's Trident to command the Trench and help him fight the Xebel and the Dead King. However, Aquaman loses control of the Trench when the Dead King's Scepter is destroyed. It is also revealed that the Trench are one of the three surviving kingdoms of Old Atlantis after Atlan plunged underwater.

=== Lazarus Planet ===
During the "Lazarus Planet" storyline, Lazarus Resin is spread around the world, mutating anybody exposed to it. A group of Trench are affected by the resin, restoring their intelligence and humanoid forms. Aquaman vows to reintegrate the Trench back into civilization.

== Powers and abilities ==
The Trench have adapted to underwater life like all the Atlantean kingdoms. They can generate bio-luminescent light from their bodies and spit a chemical from their mouth that causes paralysis. The Trench have powerful teeth and claws that can cut through most substances.

== Known Trench ==
- Trench King - The King of the Trench. Killed by Ocean Master.
- Trench Queen - The Queen of the Trench. She was killed when Aquaman threw his trident into the volcanic fissure under her.
- Trench King II - The second King of the Trench who succeeded the first after his death.
- Trench Queen II - The second Queen of the Trench.
- Shellestriah - The half-human daughter of the second Trench King.

== In other media ==
=== Film ===
- The Trench appear in Justice League: Throne of Atlantis.
- The Trench appear in DC Super Hero Girls: Legends of Atlantis.
- The Trench appear in Aquaman (2018). While on a quest to find the lost Trident of Atlan, Aquaman and Mera are attacked by a legion of Trench, though they fend them off before reaching the Hidden Sea. After acquiring Atlan's trident, Aquaman leads the Trench into battle against Orm Marius and his followers.
  - A "horror-tinged" spin-off film called The Trench was in development, with Aquaman director James Wan set to produce while Noah Gardner and Aidan Fitzgerald were asked to pen the script, but the project was cancelled by April 2021. Wan later admitted that there never had been a real plan to make a film about the Trench, and that this announcement was intended as a misdirect to cover up the real spin-off, a film focusing on Black Manta.
- An alternate universe incarnation of the Trench from Earth-Two appears in Justice Society: World War II.

=== Video games ===
- The Trench make a cameo appearance in Black Manta's ending in Injustice 2.
- A member of the Trench appears in Lego DC Super-Villains as part of the "Aquaman" DLC.
