= Atlantis (Aquaman) =

Fictitious place in DC Comics

- Atlantis in Suicide Squad (2016) #46, art by Jose Luis (penciler), Jordi Tarragona & Vicente Cifuentes (inkers), Adriano Lucas (color).
- First appearance: More Fun Comics #87 (January 1943)
- Created by: Joseph Greene; Louis Cazeneuve
- Based on: Atlantis
- Genre: Superhero

In-universe information
- Type: Continent
- Races: Various; most notably Atlanteans
- Characters: Aquaman; Mera; Tempest; Aqualad; Ocean Master; Arion; Lori Lemaris
- Publisher: DC Comics

Atlantis, sometimes also called the Kingdom of Atlantis or the Atlantean Empire, is a fictional civilization appearing in American comic books published by DC Comics, and based upon Plato's references to the island of Atlantis in Timaeus and Critias. First appearing in More Fun Comics #87 (January 1943), the setting is often associated with the hero Aquaman. Within the DC Universe, Atlantis houses various aquatic-based human lifeforms whose biological adaptations often originate from both environmental changes – after Atlantis sunk in a cataclysmic event – and influence from its magical origins. Considered a superpower, Atlantis is often stated to be among the oldest and most sophisticated civilizations in the fictional universe, and to possess significant technological and magical capabilities. Historically a hereditary monarchy, many stories involving Atlantis as a setting focuses on conflicts regarding its succession of leaders, diplomatic relations with the global world, and its fictional cultural heritage.

Atlantis made its cinematic debut in the 2017 film Justice League, set in the DC Extended Universe, and was later more prominently featured in the 2018 film Aquaman and the 2023 film Aquaman and the Lost Kingdom.

== Publication history ==
While a Golden Age of Comics version of Atlantis exists, the version in the Aquaman tales first appeared in Adventure Comics #260, in a story by writer Robert Bernstein and artist Ramona Fradon. The history of Atlantis was detailed in The Atlantis Chronicles, a 7-issue miniseries published by DC Comics from March to September 1990. It was written by Peter David and illustrated by Esteban Maroto. The series focused on a series of Atlantean historical manuscripts, also called The Atlantis Chronicles, and chronicled the rise and fall of Atlantis. Each issue dealt with a separate era or event in Atlantis' past, beginning with its sinking, as told through the royal historian's point of view.

== Fictional history ==
=== Original background ===
Map of Atlantis from Aquaman: Sword of Atlantis #42 (March 2007), art by Ricardo Villagran.

Atlantis's origins is traced to from a cosmic being that created deities from the magical dimension of Darkworld. These deities became the earliest known Lords of Chaos and Order. Among the deities includes siblings Gemini, Chaon, and Tynan, who represent order, chaos, and the balancing between them respectively. Chief among them is Calculha, a deity affiliated with light and goodness.

The benevolent Calculha and his queen, Earthborn goddess Dark Majistra, eventually ruled over a prosperous Atlantis after ending its early warring state; it came to be populated by the Homo Magi. The couple's union proved incompatible over the ages. Their children, Arion and Garn Daanuth, were separated at birth and trained in sorcery, with Calculha aligning Arion with the Lords of Order, and Majistra training Daanuth as a Lord of Chaos. This family conflict erupted when Majistra's attempt to use the Zodiac Crystals to empower herself to create a golden age using dark magic led to Majistra's displacement, Daanuth's mystical scarring, Calculha's entrapment, Arion's forced displacement of body and soul, and the tilting of Earth's axis, causing an Ice Age and a reliance on technology for Atlantis over the millennia. Arion was reborn a millennium later during the waning days of Atlantis. Teaming up with Chian and Wyynde, Arion becomes a mystical warrior of legend as he works to end the Ice Age and protect Atlantis from threats as magic continues to wane. Daanuth, over the millennia, becomes a powerful sorcerer and Lord of Chaos; his black magic allows him remain potent and inherit his mother's position as ruler of Mu. The brothers cross paths in conflict, learning of their brotherhood during their father's final moments. Daanuth is eventually sealed away. However, Atlantis eventually sinks during a decisive battle between Arion and Chaon, which disperses the survivors throughout the world.

An alternate account of Atlantis' early history also details an extraterrestrial race known as the "Hunter/Gatherers" or "Gatherers", who colonized early prehistoric Earth but were later opposed by the Annunake, a dragon-like marine species who formed a resistance formidable enough to drive the Gatherers away. Although conflicting historical information from both Atlanteans and the Hunter/Gatherers arises as the specific result of the conflict--with one account stating they were driven away, and another claiming the opposition ended mutually--the Gatherers and Annunuke were both ancestors of the modern Atlanteans, and Gatherers at least influenced Atlantean society, helping it to flourish over time alongside Homo erectus, the precursors of modern humans.

After the reign of Arion, King Orin constructed a defensive dome. However, a meteor destroyed much of the surface world, sinking the city. Orin's brother, Shalako, led a group through tunnels to reclaim the sunken city of Tritonis, whose inhabitants had not survived. Atlantean scientists later developed a serum that allowed them to breathe underwater, and the usage of magic in Tritonis further mutated the Tritonians to have fish-like tails. Some descendants of Shalako's son Dardanus inherited his telepathic abilities, marked by rare blonde hair. Dardanus's son Kordax could command sea creatures, and after leading a Tritonian revolution, was exiled, with children born with the "mark of Kordax" generally abandoned.

=== Revised background ===
After The New 52 reboot, Atlantis's history changed over time, incorporating much of the history from Arion, Lord of Atlantis comic book title and revising the backstory originally detailed in Aquaman and The Atlantis Chronicles. Within the new continuity, Atlantis's origin is once more connected to Darkworld but is revealed to be a piece of the Great Darkness and possess a variant of magical power considered uncontrollable and volatile to all but those who originate from the realm. The homo magi would come to inhabit Atlantis, with some originating from early pilgrimages from the Rock of Eternity.

Similar to earlier histories, Calculha and Majistra reigned, but also had a rivalry with the Greek god Poseidon. Their union produced twins Arion (Ahri'ahn) and Garn Daanuth, both of whom were Lords of Chaos and Order in human bodies. Coming to appreciate Atlantis, he eventually became a mentor to Arion. During Arion's reign as king, his progressive agenda led to a golden age of both magical and mystical advancement and held a benevolent alliance with the Amazons. This eventually fell apart when Arion sought to expand his nation influence into space and offer sea gods from other planets a cosmic energy known as the Life Force, originating from Poseidon's trident. Poseidon's envious nature, however, made him deceive Arion into thinking the alien ocean gods he invited were conquerors. Feeling responsible for putting Earth in danger, he used his magic and technology to invert the Life Force into the Death Force, enabling him to kill the ocean gods but at the cost of his sanity. Arion was believed killed, although the royal family of that time concealed events as he disappeared for a millennium. A legend was concocted around his death as a cautionary tale against exploration, ironically fueling isolationist tendencies he fought against in his lifetime and dissolved the alliance with the Amazons.

In another notable reign thousands of years later, Atlan's time saw another prosperous time during the waning days leading to Atlantis sinking. A unifier, Atlan fought magical threats to his kingdom but became more brutal after his rule was usurped by his brother, Orin, who disapproved of him accepting outside kingdoms into Atlantis, killed his family, and in a failed assassination attempted, oust him from rule. Using the knowledge he amassed from the last tribe to accepted into the kingdom, the Deserters, he forged the Trident of Neptune out of Nth Metal but at the expense of betraying them, with two factions within the Deserters returning to their homes traced back to Russia and Africa. In his grief, he sinks Atlantis but fails to kill the rest of Orin's family, who alongside other Atlanteans adapted for life underwater. Orin's family becomes the leading royal family members but over time, many believe themselves to be descendants of Atlan.

== Characterization ==
=== Tribes and groups in Atlantis ===
The most dominant race in Atlantis is the Atlanteans, consisting of two variants; the original variant is the homo magi race, who evolved in a parallel but separate line and were acclimated to possessing and controlling magical energies innately. The second variant, the modern Atlanteans, are descendants of the Homo magi who evolved after the Deluge, a cataclysm which sunk the continent and forced biological adaptations on its survivors. Like their ancestors, they share a natural inclination of magic and often combine it with technology but possess superhuman attributes necessary to survive in. The modern variant also has several off-shoots:

- The Xebellians are a subsect from the exiled penal colony Xebel. They are typically considered culturally martial, patriarchal, and are renown for select members having telepathic control of water (typically but not always including royalty).
- The Idyllist have been depicted as originally a pacifistic and superstitious offshoot but following the New 52, possess purple eyes, which denotes the power to have an innate encyclopedic knowledge of the history of Atlantis but are mistaken for dark magic potential and are often subjected to prejudice.

=== Leadership and military ===
Typically a hereditary monarchy, Atlantis is ultimately ruled by a ruling family; within the modern era, the ruling family is primarily those within the House of Atlan, supposed descendants of Atlan who were actually descendant of his usurper brother, Orin the First. At times a regent could be appointed. Second-in-hierarchy is the Royal Council of Atlantis, an advisory cabinet consisting members of various (usually known as Elders) handpicked and responsible for the day-to-day operations of Atlantis and appointment of a new monarch leader. While typically subservient of the royal family, various checks and balance can override the monarch's directives and establish new leadership via majority vote. Both are also supported by the Widowhood, a sacred religious order consisting primarily of women that manages spiritual affairs, traditions, officiates weddings, and advises in more interpersonal matters. The order also employs fixers with lethal capabilities.

The Atlantean military consisting of several special units and groups; The Men-of-War are the frontline army of the Atlantean military. The Drift operate as both covert operations and the secret police force under the direct command of the monarch. The Kingsguard (also known as the Royal Atlantean Guard) act as the elite bodyguards protecting the monarch.

In the ancient era within Arion's titles, the ruling family succeeding Calculha was eventually known as the Royal Court of D'Tilluh; second-in-command was his appointed royal advisor and other high-ranking position included his chief general and the Lord High Mage, overseeing magic and acting as a high-ranking official beside the king and equal to the chief general.

== Notable locations ==
Throughout the publication history, Atlantis is a hub to many city-states and locales. In Aquaman-related titles, taking place in a more modern era, the primary setting within Atlantis is Poseidonis, the capital of Atlantis named after the Greek deity Poseidon. It serves as Aquaman's main base of operations and is the administrative center of Atlantis. Atlantis also has notable districts such as the College of the Silent School, a prestigious Atlantean guild that teaches magic and its headmaster also acts as a government official overseeing the magical activities and protection. It is also one of the most secure locations on Earth. The Ninth Tride of Atlantis is the poorest district in Atlantis, consisting of outcasts, dissidents, gangs, and mutants. Due to its poverty, it is not inherently loyal to Atlantis's leadership. This district eventually turns into its own city-state known as Dagon, a rogue kingdom founded by Ocean Master composed of denizens from Ninth Tride dissatisfied with Aquaman and Mera's rule. However, Ocean Master's manipulated methods eventually costed him influence and power once more and Dagon is accepted into Atlantis officially.

=== City-states ===
Atlantis is primarily split into seven city-states (known as the "Seven Kingdoms" or "Seven Seas") with its own government hierarchy and contending history with Atlantis:

- Xebel: An extradimensional penal colony for an ancient group of separatist Atlanteans, locked behind a sealed portal in the Bermuda Triangle. In modern continuities, Xebel is typically under the leadership of Nereus and is the birthplace of Princess Mera. A patriarchal and warrior-heavy civilization, Xebel has fewer resources than Atlantis due to being sealed behind a portal, forcing the population to gather materials through shipwrecks in the Bermuda Triangle.
- Kingdom of the Trench: Located in a trench near the Mid-Atlantic Ridge, the kingdom is home to a race of the Trench, vicious cannibalistic, ocean-dwelling creatures with a piscine humanoid appearance. Initially, the Trench were characterized as being hostile to all other ocean-dwelling races, including Atlanteans. Later, it was revealed that the Trench was once a kingdom, a fact previously unknown. Over time, the Trench is later seen to be in more neutral terms with the other kingdoms. The Trench Kingdom is ruled by the Trench Queen.
- Kingdom of the Deserters: Historically the last kingdom accepted prior to Atlantis being sunk, it is known for its metallurgy and rare metals which include Nth Metal and orichalcum. It is the only kingdom that remained unchanged, having retreated from Atlantis when Atlan planned to sink the empire.
- Kingdom of the Brine: A kingdom composed of bulky, anthropomorphic crustaceans. Unlike other kingdoms, this was originally introduced in the DC Extended Universe prior to being introduced into comics.
- Kingdom of the Wrights: A kingdom consisting of humanoid sea otters with the ability to breathe underwater.
- Kingdom of the Sea Lights: A kingdom consisting of green-haired, bioluminescent humanoids with the ability to breathe underwater.

=== Arion, Lord of Atlantis ===
The series' setting differs from Aquaman's titles, taking place over at least 45 thousand years before the current era and residing on land. The capital is alternatively the City of the Golden Gate, serving as the primary setting and administrative center of ancient Atlantis known for its golden-like appearance and gate known for fending off invaders. Similar to its counterpart, Atlantis is also divided into twelve city-states with allusions to major civilizations in the real world: Mu is a city-state ruled by the title character's estranged family members, Garn Daanuth and Dark Majistra. With an appearance befitting ancient Egypt (including its inhabitants), the city-state fell into decay. Hoshan is a city-state with an appearance similar to Japan and is home to supporting character, Chian. Khe-Wannantu is a separate kingdom whose people and land resembles the Native Americans and North America respectively, ruled by a king (called a Dhonu), and is eventually destroyed in a flood.

== In other media ==
=== Television ===
- Atlantis appears in the TV shows that are part of the DC Animated Universe:
  - In Superman: The Animated Series, Atlantis was hidden for centuries until Aquaman confronts Lex Luthor about his underseas construction project.
  - Atlantis appears in the Justice League episode "The Enemy Below", where the League helped Aquaman deal with an attempted coup by Orm.
- Atlantis appears in The Flash. On Earth-1, it is a lost city. On Earth-2, Atlantis is above water.
- Atlantis appears in Young Justice with a history specific to the series. Atlantis began as a tribe led by Vandal Savage and consisting of his offspring. Following an assault by Klarion, the tribe and its inhabitants, save for Savage, were destroyed. Years later, Atlantis rose again, ruled by Savage's grandson Arion, who became the ancestor of the Homo magi. Klarion made an agreement with Savage to sink Atlantis, which killed thousands but activated the metagenes of the Homo magi, allowing them to survive underwater. Using this ability, the Homo magi reestablished Atlantis underwater.

=== Film ===
- Atlantis appears in Justice League: Throne of Atlantis.
- Atlantis appears in the films set in the DC Extended Universe:
  - Atlantis appears in Justice League and its director's cut. The Atlanteans assisted the tribes of men, the Amazons, the Olympian Gods, and the Green Lantern Corps in fighting Steppenwolf's army. After the battle, Zeus entrusted one of the Mother Boxes to the Atlanteans for safekeeping.
  - Atlantis appears in Aquaman, where there are seven kingdoms that formed after the original Atlantis sank into the ocean: Atlantis, Xebel, the Kingdom of the Trench, the Kingdom of the Brine, the Kingdom of the Fishermen, the Kingdom of the Deserters, and a missing kingdom. When Aquaman defeats Ocean Master, Atlantis, Xebel, the Fishermen, and the Brine swear allegiance to their new king.
  - Atlantis appears in Aquaman and the Lost Kingdom. Arthur and Mera are now the king and queen of Atlantis, with Arthur in conflict with the Council of Atlantis, who object to his plan to expose Atlantis to the surface due to natural disasters affecting them all. After defeating Kordax and Black Manta, Arthur reveals Atlantis' existence to the world and declares his intention to make the kingdom a member state at the United Nations.
