= The Deep =

The Deep may refer to:

== Arts and entertainment ==
=== Films ===
- The Deep (unfinished film), a 1970 unfinished film directed by Orson Welles
- The Deep (1977 film), based on the novel by Peter Benchley, starring Robert Shaw, Jacqueline Bisset and Nick Nolte
- The Deep (2012 film), an Icelandic film

=== TV series ===
- The Deep (2010 serial), a 2010 British television drama serial
- The Deep (TV series), a 2015 animated series from Australia and Canada
- Siren (TV series), a 2018–2020 American TV series, titled The Deep as a TV pilot, that aired on Freeform
- "The Deep" (CSI: NY episode), a 2007 episode of the television series CSI: NY
- "The Deep" (The War Between the Land and the Sea), an episode of The War Between the Land and the Sea

=== Literature ===
- The Deep (Crowley novel), a 1975 short novel by John Crowley
- The Deep (Dunmore novel), a 2007 children's novel by Helen Dunmore
- The Deep (Katsu novel), a 2020 horror novel by Alma Katsu
- "The Deep" (short story), a 1952 science fiction story by Isaac Asimov
- The Deep (novella), a 2019 fantasy story by Rivers Solomon with 3 others
- The Deep: Here Be Dragons, graphic novels which spawned an animated series
- The Deep, a 1976 novel by Peter Benchley
- The Deep, a 2015 horror novel by Craig Davidson writing as Nick Cutter
- The Deep, a 1961 detective novel by Mickey Spillane

=== Music ===
- The Deep (band), a short-lived band formed during the mid-1960s
- "The Deep", a song by Red Fang on Only Ghosts

=== Other uses in arts and entertainment ===
- The Deep (painting), a 1953 work by Jackson Pollock
- The Deep, an imaginary virtual reality universe in Sergei Lukyanenko's science fiction novels
- The Deep (The Boys), a character in The Boys media

== Other uses ==
- The Deep (aquarium), a large underwater aquarium in Hull, England

== See also ==
- Deep (disambiguation)
- Deep End (disambiguation)
