= The Shortening of the Way =

The Shortening of the Way may refer to:

- The Kwisatz Haderach, a fictional messiah from the Dune franchise
- "The Shortening of the Way" (song), a track from The Dune Sketchbook, the first soundtrack release for the 2021 film Dune
- The Shortening of the Way (Charlie Jade), an episode of the science fiction television series
