= DC Extended Universe =

2013–2023 superhero media franchise

- DC logo used from 2016 to 2024
- Original work: Man of Steel (2013)
- Owner: Warner Bros. Entertainment
- Years: 2013–2023
- Based on: DC Universe by DC Comics

The DC Extended Universe (DCEU) is an American media franchise and shared universe centered on a series of superhero films distributed by Warner Bros. Pictures that ran from 2013 until 2023. It is based on characters that appear in American comic books published by DC Comics. The DCEU also includes tie-in comic books, and novels. Like the original DC Universe in comic books, the DCEU is established by crossing over common plot elements, settings, cast, and characters.

Warner Bros. began trying to bring various DC Comics superheroes together in films in 2002, when Wolfgang Petersen was to direct a crossover of the Superman and Batman film franchises. A planned Justice League film was put on hold in 2008. Initial universe plans were scrapped after the 2011 film Green Lantern was a critical and commercial failure. Warner Bros. finally established its shared universe with the 2013 film Man of Steel and 2016's Batman v Superman: Dawn of Justice. This was followed by 13 films and the first season of Peacemaker, a television series for HBO Max. The DCEU's 15th and final film, Aquaman and the Lost Kingdom, was released in 2023.

The DCEU is the ninth-highest-grossing film franchise, the fifth-highest-grossing superhero film franchise, and one of the highest-grossing media franchises, having grossed more than $7 billion at the global box office. The highest-grossing DC Comics–based film is Aquaman (2018), which earned more than $1.15 billion worldwide, while several of the franchise's films failed to break even theatrically, being considered box-office bombs. Reception to the franchise was generally mixed among critics and fans.

A new rebooted franchise of films and television series, the DC Universe (DCU), was began in 2024 and was created by James Gunn and Peter Safran, who were appointed co-chairmen and co-CEOs of DC Studios in a late-2022 restructuring. Certain DCEU characters, such as Peacemaker, Amanda Waller, and Blue Beetle, are played by the same actors in the DCU, while the second season of Peacemaker takes place in the new universe.

== Etymology ==
Upon announcement of the film series, the universe was commonly called the "DC Cinematic Universe" (DCCU) by fans and the media, in keeping with the naming convention of the already established Marvel Cinematic Universe (MCU). Keith Staskiewicz, writing for Entertainment Weekly, jokingly coined the term "DC Extended Universe" (DCEU) in an article about Batman v Superman: Dawn of Justice on July 1, 2015. This term and the abbreviation DCEU quickly spread among the press and fans who took it as the official name of the franchise over the following years. According to Vulture writer Abraham Riesman, DC confirmed to him in September 2017 that the term was not used internally and they did not consider it official.

In 2016, as part of DC Films Presents: Dawn of the Justice League, both Geoff Johns and Kevin Smith referred to the franchise's name as being the "Justice League Universe". During the DC Films panel at San Diego Comic-Con 2018, a video banner displayed the words "Welcome to the Worlds of DC", after showcasing some upcoming films. As a result, some media outlets interpreted this as DC officially naming their shared film universe as the "Worlds of DC", but in March 2020, Jim Lee referred to the franchise as the DC Extended Universe at C2E2. The franchise was officially titled DC Extended Universe when the WarnerMedia streaming service HBO Max launched the following May.

Following the appointment of Peter Safran and James Gunn as heads of DC Studios, Warner Bros. Discovery (created from the merger between WarnerMedia and Discovery, Inc.) referred to DC's film and television series as part of the "DC Universe" (DCU), which some media outlets interpreted as a rebranding of the DCEU.

== Development and history ==
In 2002, Wolfgang Petersen was set to direct a Batman vs. Superman film from a script by Akiva Goldsman, but the project was shelved by Warner Bros. to focus on individual Superman and Batman projects. In 2008, a planned Justice League film directed by George Miller and titled Justice League: Mortal was placed on indefinite hold after it failed to secure tax breaks for filming in Australia. Man of Steel, a reboot of the Superman film series released in 2013, was intended to launch a shared universe if successful. Following the film's release, Warner Bros. announced a follow-up entitled Batman v Superman: Dawn of Justice (2016), establishing the DCEU. A slate of 11 DCEU films was then announced in 2014.

In 2016, Warner Bros. established DC Films after Batman v Superman did not meet Warner Bros.' box office expectations and received negative responses from fans and critics. The division, led by Geoff Johns and Jon Berg, was to oversee production and form a cohesive creative direction for the DCEU. After the failure of Justice League (2017), Johns and Berg were replaced by Walter Hamada in 2018. The DCEU expanded to television with the release of the first season of Peacemaker (2022) on HBO Max.

Discovery, Inc. completed its acquisition of DC and Warner Bros. parent company WarnerMedia in 2022, forming a new company named Warner Bros. Discovery (WBD) with David Zaslav as CEO. Zaslav sought to overhaul the DCEU, and began searching for a creative leader akin to Marvel Studios president Kevin Feige to lead DC's film and television projects. After the resignation of Hamada in 2022, James Gunn and Peter Safran were subsequently announced as the co-chairmen and CEOs of DC Studios, the successor to DC Films. In 2023, the duo unveiled their slate of ten DC projects which were to be part of the DC Universe (DCU), a soft reboot and spiritual successor to the DCEU. The pair's slate would see the final four films of the DCEU be released in 2023, with the Flash "resetting" the timeline, and their new slate, titled Gods and Monsters, officially beginning in 2024.

== Films ==
Films of the DC Extended Universe
Film	U.S. release date	Directed by	Screenplay by	Story by	Produced by
Man of Steel	June 14, 2013	Zack Snyder	David S. Goyer	David S. Goyer & Christopher Nolan	Charles Roven, Christopher Nolan, Emma Thomas, and Deborah Snyder
Batman v Superman: Dawn of Justice	March 25, 2016	Zack Snyder	Chris Terrio and David S. Goyer	Chris Terrio and David S. Goyer	Charles Roven and Deborah Snyder
Suicide Squad	August 5, 2016	David Ayer (Note: The footage shot during the film's principal photography was written by David Ayer but the footage shot during the film's reshoots/additional photography (described as being a higher amount than the average for a film) was written by Geoff Johns. Ayer retained sole writing credit for the finished film.)	David Ayer	David Ayer	Charles Roven and Richard Suckle
Wonder Woman	June 2, 2017	Patty Jenkins	Allan Heinberg	Zack Snyder & Allan Heinberg and Jason Fuchs	Charles Roven, Deborah Snyder, Zack Snyder, and Richard Suckle
Justice League	November 17, 2017	Zack Snyder (Note: Snyder was the director during principal photography, but was replaced by Joss Whedon during post-production. Snyder retained directorial credit for the finished film, though reports have indicated Whedon reshot a majority of the film. Consequently, Snyder released a director's cut in 2021.)	Chris Terrio and Joss Whedon	Chris Terrio & Zack Snyder	Charles Roven, Deborah Snyder, Jon Berg, and Geoff Johns
Aquaman	December 21, 2018	James Wan	David Leslie Johnson-McGoldrick and Will Beall	Geoff Johns & James Wan and Will Beall	Peter Safran and Rob Cowan
Shazam!	April 5, 2019	David F. Sandberg	Henry Gayden	Henry Gayden and Darren Lemke	Peter Safran
Birds of Prey	February 7, 2020	Cathy Yan	Christina Hodson	Christina Hodson	Margot Robbie, Bryan Unkeless, and Sue Kroll
Wonder Woman 1984 (Note: This release debuted concurrently in theaters and on HBO Max.)	December 25, 2020	Patty Jenkins	Patty Jenkins & Geoff Johns & Dave Callaham	Patty Jenkins & Geoff Johns	Charles Roven, Deborah Snyder, Zack Snyder, Patty Jenkins, Gal Gadot, and Stephen Jones
Zack Snyder's Justice League (Note: This is the extended director's cut of Justice League (2017) that was released exclusively on HBO Max.)	March 18, 2021	Zack Snyder	Chris Terrio	Chris Terrio & Zack Snyder and Will Beall	Charles Roven and Deborah Snyder
The Suicide Squad	August 5, 2021	James Gunn	James Gunn	James Gunn	Charles Roven and Peter Safran
Black Adam	October 21, 2022	Jaume Collet-Serra	Adam Sztykiel and Rory Haines & Sohrab Noshirvani	Adam Sztykiel and Rory Haines & Sohrab Noshirvani	Beau Flynn, Hiram Garcia, Dwayne Johnson, and Dany Garcia
Shazam! Fury of the Gods	March 17, 2023	David F. Sandberg	Henry Gayden and Chris Morgan	Henry Gayden and Chris Morgan	Peter Safran
The Flash	June 16, 2023	Andy Muschietti	Christina Hodson	John Francis Daley & Jonathan Goldstein and Joby Harold (Note: The Writers Guild of America West also credits individually: Rebecca Drysdale, Rick Famuyiwa, Seth Grahame-Smith, Geoff Johns, Phil Lord, Chris Miller, Ezra Miller, Grant Morrison, and Adam Sztykiel for writing additional literary materials although they are not accredited on-screen.)	Barbara Muschietti and Michael Disco
Blue Beetle	August 18, 2023	Ángel Manuel Soto	Gareth Dunnet-Alcocer	Gareth Dunnet-Alcocer	John Rickard and Zev Foreman
Aquaman and the Lost Kingdom	December 22, 2023	James Wan	David Leslie Johnson-McGoldrick	James Wan & David Leslie Johnson-McGoldrick and Jason Momoa & Thomas Pa'a Sibbett	Peter Safran, James Wan, and Rob Cowan

=== Man of Steel (2013) ===
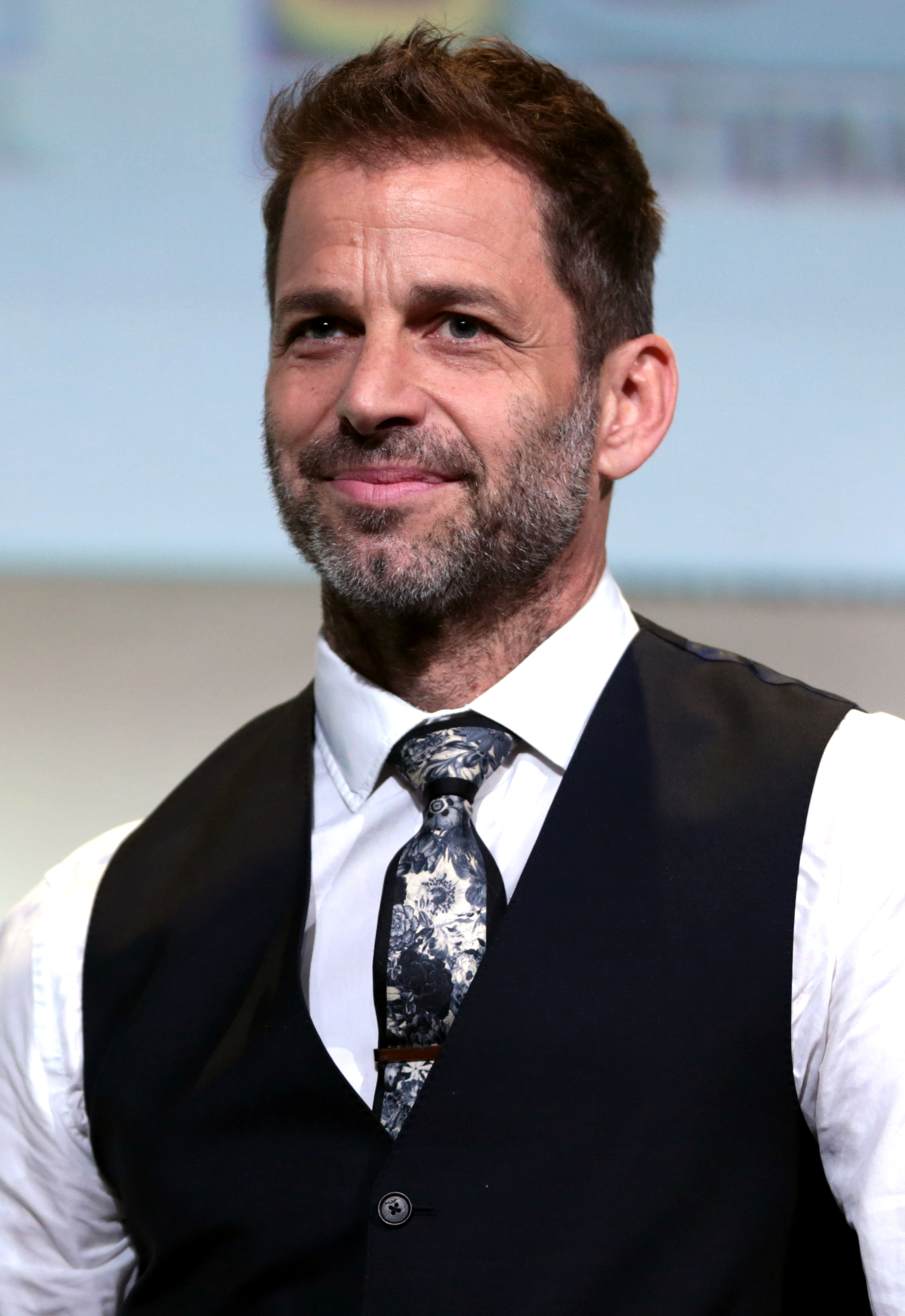
Zack Snyder, the director of Man of Steel, Batman v Superman: Dawn of Justice, and co-story writer/director of Justice League

Kal-El / Clark Kent, who arrived on Earth years ago as an infant from Krypton, struggles with why he was sent to Earth. Raised by his adoptive parents, Jonathan and Martha Kent, Clark adopts the persona "Superman", and learns if his abilities are meant to maintain peace or conquer the world.

During story discussions for The Dark Knight Rises (2012), David S. Goyer told Christopher Nolan his idea regarding how to present Superman in a modern context. Impressed with Goyer's concept, Nolan pitched the idea to the studio, who hired Nolan to produce and Goyer to write based on the financial and critical success of The Dark Knight (2008). In October 2010, Zack Snyder was hired to direct the film, and Henry Cavill was cast as Clark Kent / Superman in January 2011. Principal photography began in August 2011. Man of Steel was released in North America on June 14, 2013.

=== Batman v Superman: Dawn of Justice (2016) ===
Gotham City-based vigilante Batman travels to Metropolis to preemptively combat Superman, fearing what would happen if the latter is kept unchecked, while another threat endangers humankind.

By June 2013, Warner Bros. were fast-tracking a sequel to Man of Steel, with Snyder and Goyer returning as director and writer, respectively. Nolan was involved in an advisory role as executive producer. The sequel included Batman in a main role, and serves as a reboot of the Batman film series. Cavill, Amy Adams, Diane Lane, and Laurence Fishburne reprised their Man of Steel roles, while Ben Affleck was cast as Bruce Wayne / Batman. Chris Terrio was hired to rewrite Goyer's script. Originally scheduled to be released in July 2015, the release date was changed to May 6, 2016, to give the filmmakers "time to realize fully their vision, given the complex visual nature of the story". The film's title was revealed to be Batman v Superman: Dawn of Justice. Initial filming occurred on October 19, 2013, at East Los Angeles College, before full principal photography began in May 2014 and concluded that December. Production took place in Detroit, Illinois, New Mexico, Africa and the South Pacific. After another date change, the film was released in North America on March 25, 2016.

Batman v Superman: Dawn of Justice is set 18 months after the events of Man of Steel. The film introduces Gal Gadot as Diana Prince / Wonder Woman, Ezra Miller as Barry Allen / The Flash, Jason Momoa as Arthur Curry / Aquaman, Ray Fisher as Victor Stone / Cyborg, and Joe Morton as Dr. Silas Stone. Steppenwolf, who serves as the main antagonist in Justice League (2017), was introduced through a brief scene not included in the film's theatrical release but instead revealed online by Warner Bros. on March 28, before being included in the Ultimate Edition home video release.

=== Suicide Squad (2016) ===
After Superman's death, a secret government agency recruits imprisoned supervillains to execute dangerous black ops missions and rescue the world from a powerful threat, in exchange for clemency.

In February 2009, prior to the development of the DCEU, Warner Bros. was developing a Suicide Squad film, with Dan Lin producing and Justin Marks writing the script. Warner Bros. announced Suicide Squad in October 2014, with David Ayer as director, also serving as screenwriter. The main cast included Will Smith, Margot Robbie, Jared Leto, Jai Courtney, Jay Hernandez, Adewale Akinnuoye-Agbaje, Karen Fukuhara, Cara Delevingne, Viola Davis, and Joel Kinnaman. Principal photography took place from April to August 2015 in Toronto. Suicide Squad was released in North America on August 5, 2016.

Suicide Squad is set after the events of Batman v Superman: Dawn of Justice. Affleck and Miller reprise their roles as Bruce Wayne / Batman and Barry Allen / The Flash from that film. In a mid-credits scene, Amanda Waller (portrayed by Davis) meets Wayne in a restaurant and hands him a dossier containing information on future members of the Justice League.

=== Wonder Woman (2017) ===
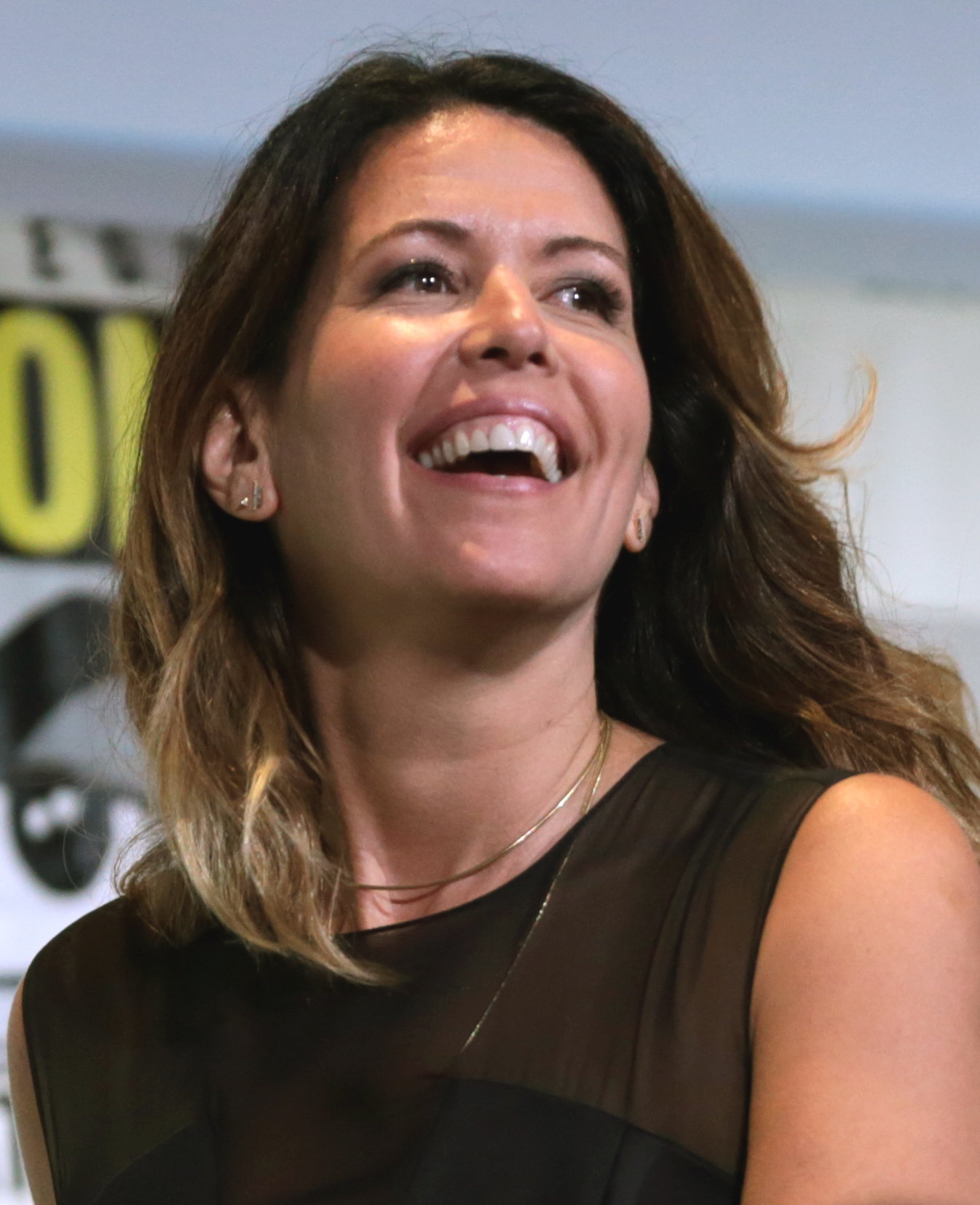
Patty Jenkins, the director of Wonder Woman and co-writer/director of Wonder Woman 1984

Diana of Themyscira, an Amazon warrior who is also the demigoddess daughter of the god Zeus, uses her talents and abilities to help humanity during World War I.

In December 2013, Gal Gadot was cast as Diana Prince / Wonder Woman and signed a three-picture deal which included a solo film. The film was announced in October 2014, and Michelle MacLaren was confirmed to direct from a screenplay by Jason Fuchs the next month. MacLaren left the project the following year in April due to creative differences, and Patty Jenkins was hired to replace her. Filming occurred from November 2015 to May 2016 and took place in the United Kingdom, France and Italy. Wonder Woman was released in North America on June 2, 2017.

=== Justice League (2017) ===
Motivated by Superman's death at the hands of Doomsday, Batman and Wonder Woman assemble a team of metahumans to stop the threat of Steppenwolf, who is in search of three Mother Boxes scattered across Earth.

By June 2013, Goyer was set to write Justice League as part of a three-film deal he signed for Man of Steel. Snyder was confirmed to return as director in April 2014, and the film was announced in October as Justice League Part One. In 2016, Chris Terrio was revealed to have written the script, and the title was changed to simply Justice League by June. Affleck, Cavill, Gadot, Momoa, Miller, and Fisher reprised their respective roles from previous films. Filming took place from April to October 2016 at Warner Bros. Studios, Leavesden in England, as well as locations around London and in Iceland. In May 2017, Snyder stepped down from his duties on the film due to his daughter's death; Joss Whedon filled his position on post-production, with additional scenes being written and directed by him. Though Whedon was not officially credited for his role as post-production director, he completed enough additional work for a screenwriting credit on the film. Justice League was released worldwide on November 17, 2017.

Reprising their roles from previous films are Jeremy Irons as Alfred Pennyworth, Diane Lane as Martha Kent, Amy Adams as Lois Lane, Jesse Eisenberg as Lex Luthor, Connie Nielsen as Hippolyta, Robin Wright as Antiope, and Joe Morton as Silas Stone. Justice League also introduces J. K. Simmons as James Gordon, Amber Heard as Mera, and Billy Crudup as Henry Allen, with Joe Manganiello appearing as Slade Wilson / Deathstroke in a post-credits scene.

==== Zack Snyder's Justice League (2021) ====
The divisive reaction to the theatrical cut of Justice League, with Snyder leaving directorial duties and the final cut of the film in the hands of Whedon, led to a fan-driven campaign for a "Snyder Cut" of the film. Arguments were made that Snyder's vision would be more cohesive to the previous films. In March 2019, Snyder confirmed his original cut did exist, and stated that it was up to Warner Bros. to release it. Warner Bros. remained silent regarding the matter, though Variety reported in November that Warner Bros. was unlikely to release Snyder's version of Justice League, with one studio insider describing it as "a pipe dream". Snyder announced in May 2020 that HBO Max would be releasing his cut of Justice League on their service on March 18, 2021. Initially conceived as a four-part miniseries, it was ultimately released as a four-hour film, twice the length of the theatrical version. Snyder stated this version is intended to not affect the future of the DCEU continuity, but that it takes place in a slightly alternate universe. The new cut cost an estimated $70 million to complete, primarily for visual effects and additional photography. Some actors returned to their roles for the additional photography. Work on the cut was completed in January 2021.

Characters in the film who did not appear in the theatrical version include the Joker (with Jared Leto reprising the role from Suicide Squad), General Swanwick / Martian Manhunter (with Harry Lennix reprising the role from Man of Steel and Batman v Superman: Dawn of Justice), Darkseid (portrayed by Ray Porter), DeSaad (portrayed by Peter Guinness), Nuidis Vulko (portrayed by Willem Dafoe), Iris West (portrayed by Kiersey Clemons), Ryan Choi (portrayed by Zheng Kai), a Green Lantern, as well as Granny Goodness.

=== Aquaman (2018) ===
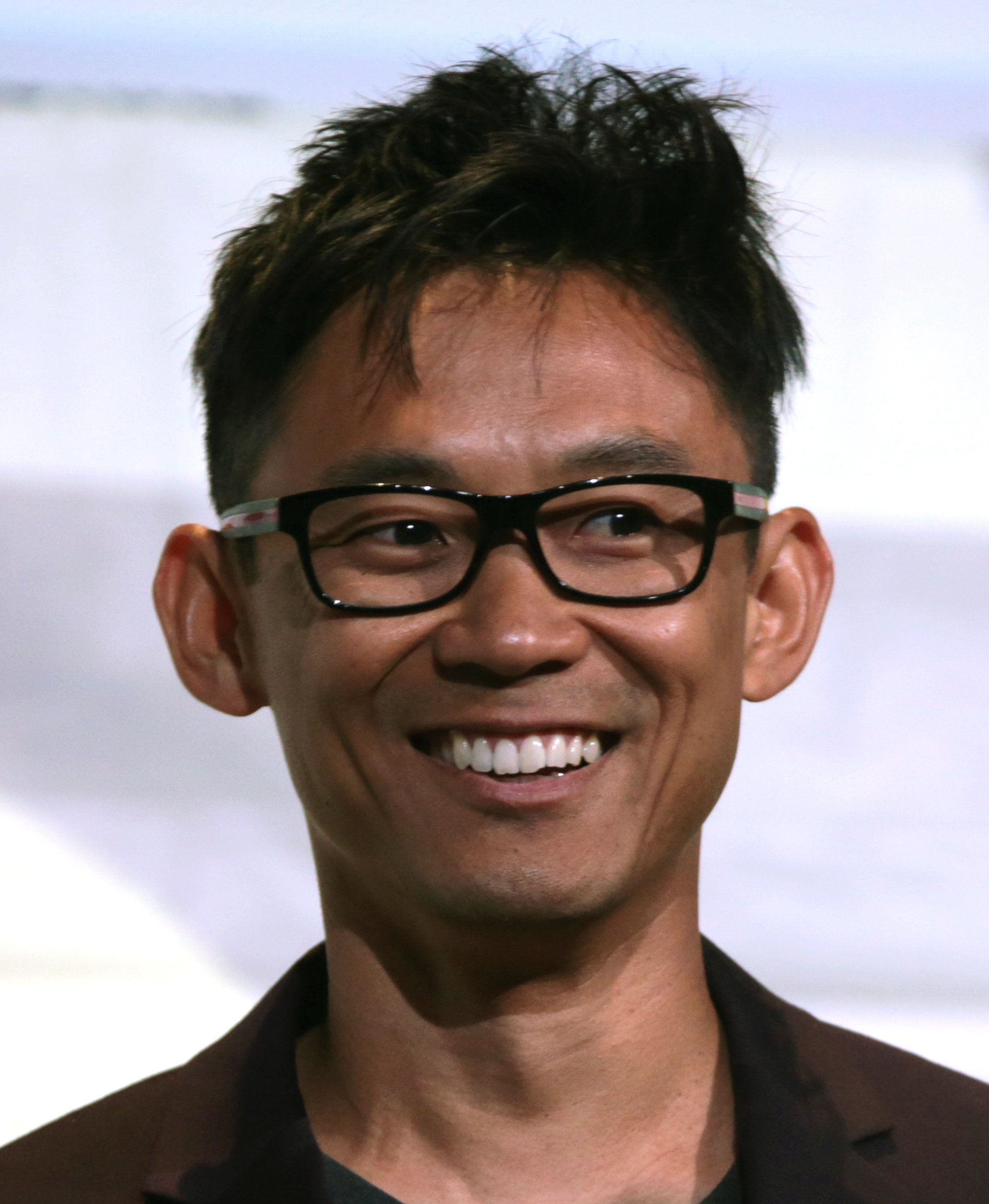
James Wan, the co-story writer/director of the Aquaman films

Arthur Curry, a half-Atlantean assistant lighthouse keeper, sets out to lead the underwater kingdom of Atlantis against his half-brother, King Orm, who seeks to unite the seven underwater kingdoms against the surface world.

Jason Momoa was cast as Arthur Curry / Aquaman in June 2014. By August, Will Beall and Kurt Johnstad were writing competing scripts for the character's solo film. Aquaman was announced in October. James Wan was hired as director the following year, as well as to oversee the screenplay by Johnstad. David Leslie Johnson was later brought to write a new script. Beall returned to write the script, based on a story treatment by Wan and Geoff Johns. Johnson worked on a rewrite of Beall's script with Wan and producer Peter Safran. Principal photography began in May 2017 in Queensland, Australia and wrapped that October. Aquaman was released in North America on December 21, 2018.

Aquaman is set after the events of Justice League, though critics have noticed numerous inconsistencies between the two theatrically released films. Furthermore, Momoa claimed that the film takes place after "Zack's cut", with the ending of that version of the film directly tying into the events of Aquaman. Heard reprises her role as Mera from Justice League, while Dafoe is introduced as Nuidis Vulko.

=== Shazam! (2019) ===
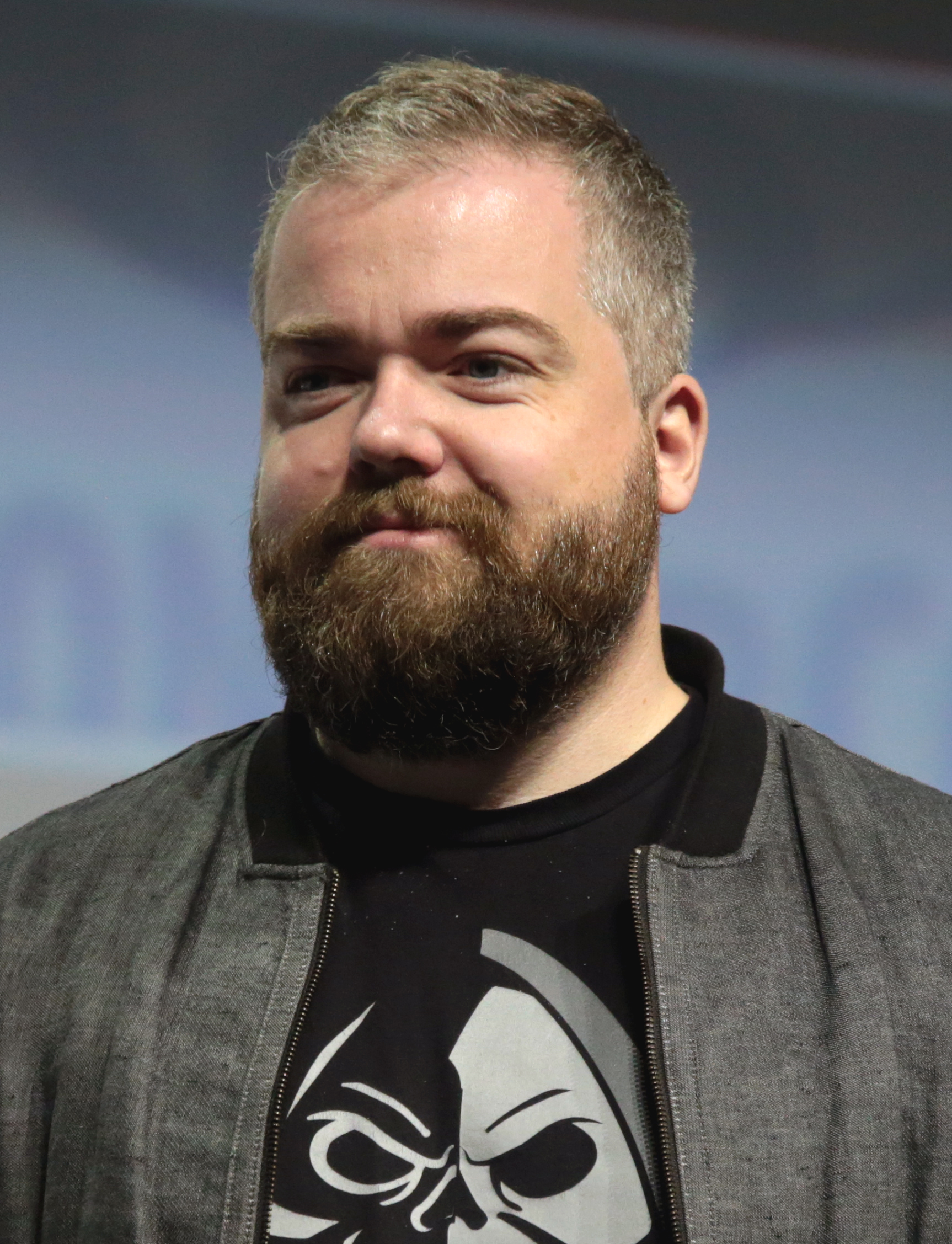
David F. Sandberg, the director of the Shazam! films

By speaking "Shazam", Billy Batson, a 14-year-old foster child, can turn into an adult superhero, courtesy of an ancient wizard. He attempts to master his powers and defeat the evil forces controlled by Dr. Thaddeus Sivana.

In August 2014, Dwayne Johnson announced his attachment to a project about the superhero Shazam, formerly known as Captain Marvel. Johnson was revealed to be portraying the antihero Black Adam, Shazam's nemesis in the film, with Darren Lemke set to write the script in September. In October, Warner Bros. announced Shazam as a film in its upcoming slate. By January 2017, Henry Gayden was working on the script. In July, David F. Sandberg was hired to direct Shazam!. Johnson was dropped from the project, instead starring in a Black Adam solo film. By October, Zachary Levi was cast as Shazam, and in November, Asher Angel was cast as Shazam's child-age alter ego, Billy Batson. Principal photography began in January 2018 and wrapped that May, with most of the filming taking place at Pinewood Toronto Studios, among other locations around Toronto. Shazam! was released in North America on April 5, 2019.

Shazam! is set after the events of Justice League. Superman makes a cameo appearance at the end of the film, but his face is not shown as Henry Cavill was unable to reprise the role due to scheduling conflicts. The villain Mister Mind is introduced in a mid-credits scene.

=== Birds of Prey (2020) ===
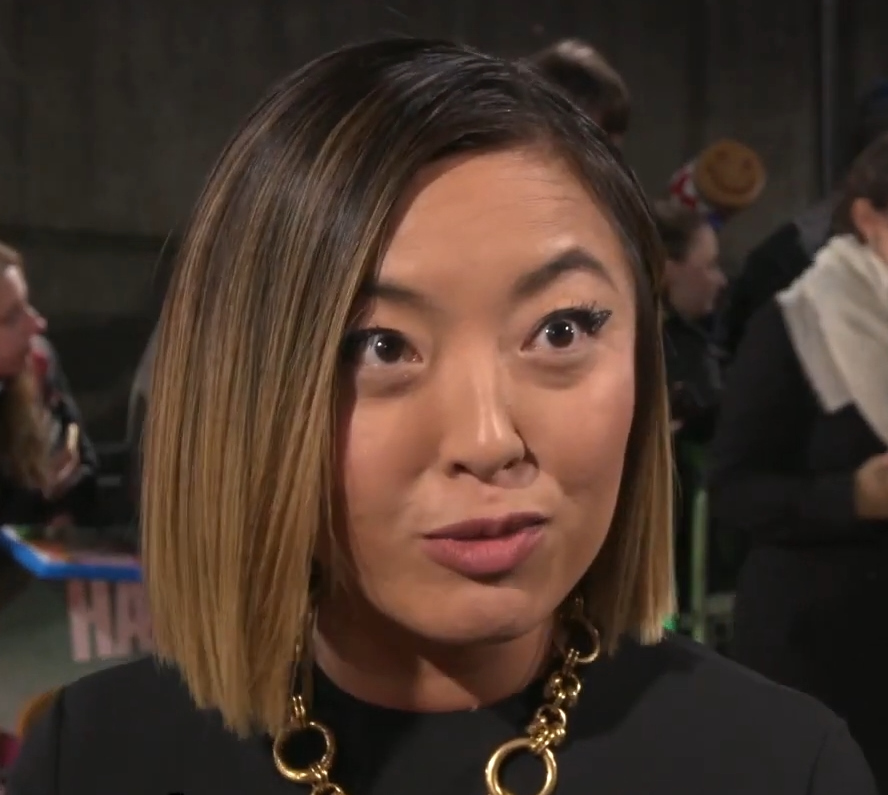
Cathy Yan, the director of Birds of Prey

When Cassandra Cain, a young girl, comes across a diamond belonging to crime lord Black Mask, Harley Quinn joins forces with Black Canary, Huntress, and Renee Montoya to help protect her.

By November 2016, a film based on the female superhero team Birds of Prey was in development, with Christina Hodson signed on as screenwriter. By April 2018, Warner Bros. selected Cathy Yan as director, with Margot Robbie reprising her role as Harley Quinn from Suicide Squad. Robbie also acted as producer alongside Sue Kroll and Bryan Unkeless. The film is the first theatrical R-rated installment in the DCEU and has a smaller budget than most of the other films. In addition to Robbie's starring role, the cast also includes Mary Elizabeth Winstead, Jurnee Smollett-Bell, Rosie Perez, and Ella Jay Basco. The full title of the film was revealed as Birds of Prey (and the Fantabulous Emancipation of One Harley Quinn) by Robbie. Principal photography commenced in January 2019 in Los Angeles and lasted until April. Birds of Prey held its world premiere in London on January 29, 2020, and was later released in North America on February 7.

Birds of Prey is set after the events of Suicide Squad.

=== Wonder Woman 1984 (2020) ===
Diana Prince comes into conflict with the Soviet Union during the Cold War in the 1980s and finds two formidable foes in the form of Maxwell Lord and Cheetah.

By June 2017, Geoff Johns and Patty Jenkins had begun work on the story treatment for a Wonder Woman sequel. In July, Johns was working on the script, and the sequel was officially announced at San Diego Comic-Con, with Gadot reprising the lead role. In September, Jenkins signed a deal to return as director, and brought on David Callaham to pen the script with her and Johns. Production began in June 2018 and concluded that December. Filming locations included the District of Columbia, Northern Virginia, Warner Bros. Studios, Leavesden in the United Kingdom and the islands of Tenerife and Fuerteventura in Spain. Wonder Woman 1984 was released in the United States on HBO Max and in theaters simultaneously on December 25, 2020.

In a mid-credits scene, Lynda Carter, who starred as Wonder Woman in a 1970s television series, is introduced as Asteria, a legendary Amazon warrior who possessed ancient golden armor that Gadot's Wonder Woman wears in the film.

=== The Suicide Squad (2021) ===
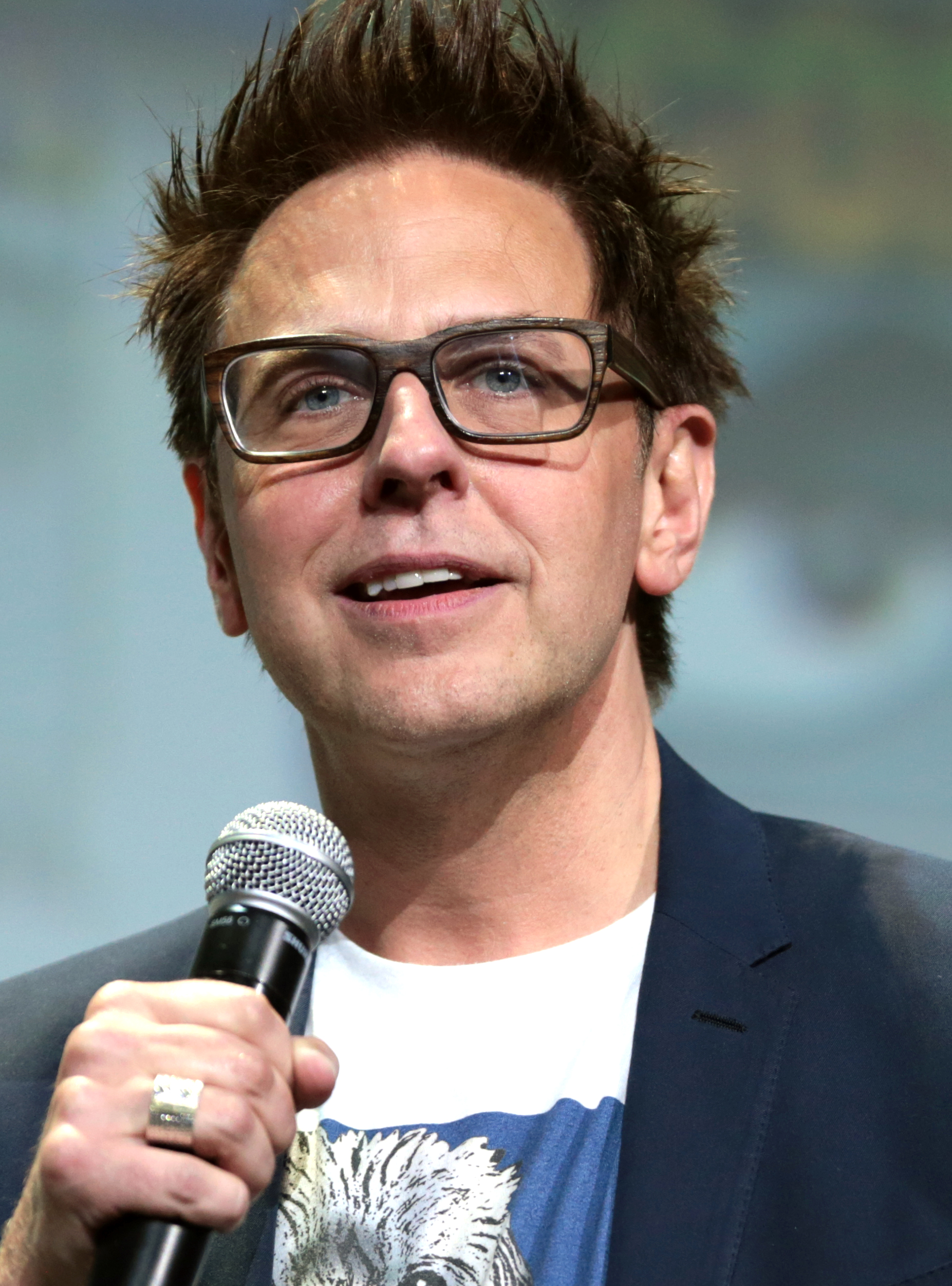
James Gunn, the writer/director of The Suicide Squad and showrunner of the spin-off series Peacemaker

Amanda Waller sends a new Task Force X, consisting of both old and new members, on a mission to destroy a Nazi-era laboratory containing experiments.

In March 2016, a Suicide Squad sequel was announced to be in development, with Ayer returning as director. Adam Cozad was hired to write the script by March 2017. By July, a new story treatment was written by Zak Penn. In September, Gavin O'Connor was hired as director and writer after Ayer dropped out. O'Connor completed the script with David Bar Katz and Todd Stashwick by September 2018. The next month, O'Connor left the project as Warner Bros. believed the script was too similar to Birds of Prey. In 2019, the film was re-titled The Suicide Squad, with James Gunn directing, from a new script he wrote. Gunn chose the project over various other films Warner Bros. had in development, including a Superman film. In March, Idris Elba joined the cast. He was initially hired to replace Smith as Deadshot, who dropped out due to scheduling conflicts, but was later decided that Elba would play a new character so Smith could return in the future. Robbie, Kinnaman, Courtney, and Davis reprise their roles from Suicide Squad. Production began in September 2019 at Pinewood Atlanta Studios in Atlanta, with additional filming following in Panama, and concluded in February 2020. The Suicide Squad began its international release on July 30, 2021, in the United Kingdom, and was released theatrically and on the streaming platform HBO Max in the United States on August 5.

=== Black Adam (2022) ===
Nearly 5,000 years after he was bestowed with the powers of the Egyptian gods and imprisoned, Black Adam is freed from his tomb, ready to unleash his form of justice on the modern world.

In September 2014, after being considered to play Shazam and Lobo, Dwayne Johnson was cast as Black Adam, a central villain of DC's Shazam franchise. The character was intended to be introduced in Shazam!, but Johnson convinced the film's production studios to divide the narrative to focus on Black Adam's origin, with Black Adam and Shazam instead set to cross paths in a future film. Adam Sztykiel was hired as screenwriter. Jaume Collet-Serra was hired as director in June 2019, with Johnson, Beau Flynn, Hiram Garcia, and Dany Garcia attached as producers. By September 2020, Rory Haines and Sohrab Noshirvani had written a new draft of the script. Filming began in April 2021 and wrapped that July. Black Adam was released in the United States on October 21, 2022.

The film features the Justice Society of America, consisting of Aldis Hodge as Hawkman, Noah Centineo as Atom Smasher, Quintessa Swindell as Cyclone, and Pierce Brosnan as Doctor Fate. Reprising their roles from previous DCEU media are Davis as Amanda Waller, Djimon Hounsou as the wizard Shazam, and Jennifer Holland as Emilia Harcourt, with Henry Cavill appearing as Kal-El / Clark Kent / Superman in a mid-credits scene.

=== Shazam! Fury of the Gods (2023) ===
Billy Batson and his foster siblings, who transform into superheroes by saying "Shazam!", are forced to get back into action and fight the Daughters of Atlas, who want to use a weapon that could destroy the world.

A sequel to Shazam! entered development in April 2019, with Henry Gayden returning as writer. David F. Sandberg and Peter Safran returned as director and producer, respectively, and Chris Morgan was hired as an additional screenwriter. Zachary Levi reprises his role as the titular superhero, as most of the adult and child cast in the Shazam Family. At DC FanDome in August 2020, the film's title was announced as Shazam! Fury of the Gods. Filming began in May 2021 in Atlanta and concluded that August. Shazam! Fury of the Gods was released in the United States on March 17, 2023.

In January 2023, co-CEOs of DC Studios James Gunn and Peter Safran stated that Shazam! Fury of the Gods will lead right into the events of The Flash.

=== The Flash (2023) ===
Barry Allen travels back in time to prevent his mother's murder, which brings unintended consequences.

By July 2013, Greg Berlanti was developing a film that centered around Barry Allen / The Flash, and drafted a script alongside Geoff Johns, Chris Brancato, Michael Green, and Marc Guggenheim. In October 2014, Warner Bros. announced The Flash with a scheduled 2018 release date, and that Ezra Miller was cast in the starring role. A new story treatment was being written by Phil Lord and Christopher Miller the following year in April. Over the next two years, Seth Grahame-Smith and Rick Famuyiwa had individually dropped out as director due to creative differences with the studio. Joby Harold was hired to do a page-one rewrite of the script in January 2017, which previously had drafts written by Grahame-Smith and Famuyiwa. In July, the title for the film was changed to Flashpoint, based on the comic book storyline of the same name. Dan Mazeau was brought on as co-writer. In March 2018, John Francis Daley and Jonathan Goldstein were hired to co-direct. In 2019, following creative differences with the co-directors' work on the script, Miller was hired to co-write a new draft in collaboration with Grant Morrison. By July, Daley and Goldstein had left the project, while Andy Muschietti and Christina Hodson were hired to replace them as director and screenwriter, respectively. Barbara Muschietti and Michael Disco serve as producers. Filming began in April 2021, at Warner Bros. Studios, Leavesden in Hertfordshire, England, and wrapped that October. The Flash was released on June 16, 2023.

The Flash explores the multiverse concept using the Speed Force and features multiple superheroes, including Michael Keaton as Bruce Wayne / Batman (reprising his role from the 1989 film Batman and its 1992 sequel Batman Returns) and Sasha Calle as Supergirl. Ben Affleck also reprises his role as the DCEU version of Bruce Wayne / Batman. The film also "restarts" the DCEU, according to Barbara Muschietti. Michael Shannon and Antje Traue reprise their roles as General Zod and Faora-Ul, respectively, from Man of Steel, with Ron Livingston replacing Billy Crudup in the role of Henry Allen, Barry's father, who appeared in Justice League and its director's cut, and Kiersey Clemons returning as Iris West from the latter cut.

In January 2023, co-CEOs of DC Studios James Gunn and Peter Safran stated that The Flash would "reset" the DCEU continuity and lead right into the events of Blue Beetle, Aquaman and the Lost Kingdom, and their future slate of films in the new DCU continuity, starting with "Chapter One: Gods and Monsters". Gunn later explained that The Flash changes some aspects and characters, but not every aspect of the franchise that came before.

=== Blue Beetle (2023) ===
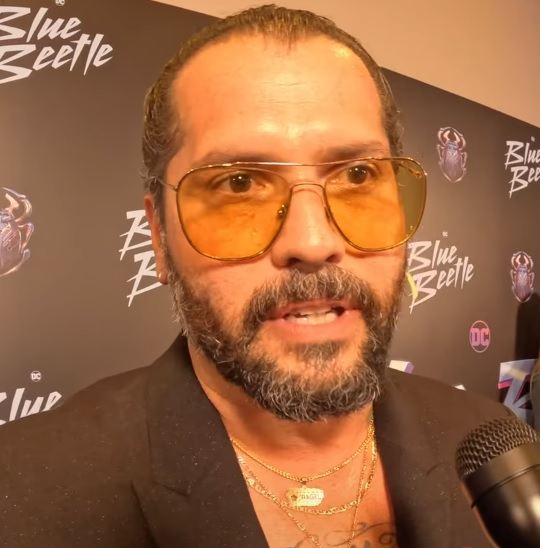
Ángel Manuel Soto, the director of Blue Beetle

After Jaime Reyes graduates from college and returns to his hometown Palmera City, he is chosen to become a symbiotic host to the Scarab, an ancient alien biotechnological relic that grants him a powerful exoskeleton armor, turning him into the superhero Blue Beetle.

In November 2018, a film centered on the Jaime Reyes incarnation of Blue Beetle was in development, with a script written by Gareth Dunnet-Alcocer. By February 2021, Ángel Manuel Soto signed on as director, and Xolo Maridueña was cast as the titular character in August. John Rickard and Zev Foreman serve as producers. Principal photography commenced in May in Atlanta, and wrapped on July 18, 2022, in Puerto Rico. Initially developed as an HBO Max exclusive film, Blue Beetle was later changed to a theatrical release, and was released on August 18, 2023.

In January 2023, co-CEOs of DC Studios James Gunn and Peter Safran stated that Blue Beetle directly follows the events of The Flash, where much of the franchise will be "reset" in such a way that Blue Beetle will be "totally disconnected (from everything that came before) and can be a part of the DCU".

=== Aquaman and the Lost Kingdom (2023) ===
Four years after the events of the first film, Arthur Curry / Aquaman is forced to protect Atlantis and his loved ones from devastation after an ancient power is unleashed by David Kane / Black Manta obtaining the cursed Black Trident. To achieve this, he seeks help from an unlikely ally, his brother Orm.

In January 2019, Warner Bros. confirmed development of an Aquaman sequel, with intentions for James Wan to return as director. In addition to starring, Momoa has a larger creative role in the sequel; together with his writing partner Thomas Pa'a Sibbett, he pitched their idea for the sequel to Warner Bros. and co-wrote the first story treatment. In February, David Leslie Johnson-McGoldrick signed on as screenwriter; he completed the script alongside Wan. Producer Peter Safran said that the film will explore the other Seven Kingdoms of Atlantis. The title was announced as Aquaman and the Lost Kingdom. Filming occurred from June 2021 to January 2022 in the United Kingdom, Hawaii and Los Angeles. Aquaman and the Lost Kingdom was released on December 22, 2023.

In January 2023, co-CEOs of DC Studios James Gunn and Peter Safran stated that Aquaman and the Lost Kingdom would take place following the "reset" of the timeline of the DC film by The Flash, and that it would be directly followed by the DCU's first slate of content, "Chapter One: Gods and Monsters", with that franchise's "true start" being the 2025 film Superman.

== Short film ==
=== Epilogue: Etta's Mission (2017) ===
Epilogue: Etta's Mission is a short film directed by Patty Jenkins and released on the Blu-ray edition of Wonder Woman (2017). It takes place sometime after the main events of the film and focuses on Etta recruiting the remainder of the "Wonder Men" for a new mission involving the Mother Box.

== Television series ==
Series	Season	Episodes	Originally released		Showrunner
Series	Season	Episodes	First released	Last released	Showrunner
Peacemaker	1	8	January 13, 2022	February 17, 2022	James Gunn

=== Peacemaker season 1 (2022) ===
Task Force X member Christopher Smith / Peacemaker is sent on a black-ops mission to target "butterflies", individuals possessed by parasitic, insect-like creatures invading the human race.

By September 2020, a television series spin-off of The Suicide Squad centered on Peacemaker was in development for HBO Max. James Gunn served as an executive producer alongside Peter Safran, wrote its eight episodes and directed several of them. John Cena reprises his role as Peacemaker from the film. Filming began in Vancouver, Canada in January 2021 and concluded that July. The first three episodes of Peacemaker were released on January 13, 2022, with subsequent episodes released weekly until February 17. Soon after the series ended, the series was renewed for a second season, with Gunn set to write and direct every episode.

The first season of Peacemaker is set five months after the events of The Suicide Squad, with Steve Agee and Jennifer Holland reprising their respective roles as John Economos and Emilia Harcourt from that film. Viola Davis, Jason Momoa, and Ezra Miller also make uncredited appearances as their respective DCEU roles of Amanda Waller, Arthur Curry / Aquaman, and Barry Allen / Flash, with Superman and Wonder Woman also appearing portrayed by stand-ins, with their faces obscured by the darkness. The series contains references to the wider DC universe, including confirmation that Bat-Mite, Doll Man, Matter-Eater Lad, Kite Man, and Green Arrow exist in the DCEU. Additionally, a newspaper headline detailing the Intergang can be briefly seen, ahead of their debut in Black Adam.

After the second season was ordered following the positive reactions garnered by the series, with the show's creator James Gunn confirmed to write and direct all planned episodes, and John Cena set to reprise the title role, Gunn stated that the new season would explore the greater ramifications from the aftermath of the first season's events. Following the surprise cancellation of the HBO Max film Batgirl in August 2022, Gunn reaffirmed that Peacemaker's second season was "safe" and would continue development. Later in the same month he stated that filming was scheduled to begin in 2023, but in January 2023 Gunn said that the second season was delayed as he was busy working on other projects.

== Canceled and reworked projects ==
Over the years, many projects that were at one point supposed to be part of the DCEU have either been moved into a different continuity, outright canceled, or unreleased. Following the end of the DCEU and reboot into the DCU, various projects that were in development have been shelved though they may be repurposed for the new continuity:

- The Amazons: In December 2019, Patty Jenkins announced a Wonder Woman spin-off film, focusing on the titular race of Themyscira. Jenkins was intended to serve as a producer, while it was later revealed that she and Geoff Johns had written the story, with a plot that was set chronologically between Wonder Woman 1984 and the planned third film. A similar television series for HBO Max was later announced in January 2023 as a part of the DC Universe, titled Paradise Lost.
- Batgirl: In March 2017, Joss Whedon was hired to write, direct and produce a film centered around Barbara Gordon / Batgirl. Production was scheduled to commence in 2018, but Whedon stepped down in February. In April, Christina Hodson was hired as the screenwriter for Batgirl, which she would begin writing after completing work on The Flash. In May 2021, Adil El Arbi and Bilall Fallah were hired as the film's co-directors, with Kristin Burr serving as producer. In July, Leslie Grace was cast in the titular role. Principal photography began in Glasgow in November 2021, and wrapped by the end of March 2022. Batgirl was scheduled to be released sometime in 2022 on HBO Max, though it was reportedly being reconsidered for theatrical release by Warner Bros. Discovery by April. That August, Warner Bros. Discovery canceled the plans to release the film on HBO Max or theatrically following poor test screenings. The film was deemed not "big" enough for the big screen yet too expensive to be released on HBO Max. Despite the project's cancellation, the studio still hoped to work with Arbi, Fallah and Grace on other DC projects. In January 2023, co-CEO of DC Studios Peter Safran commented that Zaslav had made the right decision with canceling the project, while providing positive statements regarding its creative team he stated that it was "not releasable". Safran elaborated that "it would not have been able to compete in the theatrical marketplace; it was built for the small screen". The studio however looks to reintroduce the character elsewhere in the franchise, while also intending to work with Arbi and Fallah in the future.
- Ben Affleck's The Batman: In July 2015, Ben Affleck was in negotiations to direct, produce, star in, and co-write (with Geoff Johns) a Batman film. Affleck was confirmed as the film's director at San Diego Comic-Con in 2016. Affleck stepped down as director in January 2017, and Matt Reeves was hired to direct and co-produce the film the next month. Under Reeves, the film shifted focus towards a younger and inexperienced iteration of the character, with the filmmaker focusing on noir and detective fiction aspects from the comics. Affleck eventually left the project altogether and was replaced by Robert Pattinson as Batman, allowing the film to drop its connections to the DCEU and establishing a separate universe. The film launched what Reeves referred to as "The Batman Epic Crime Saga," being set to comprise an eventual trilogy of films and spin-off series for television such as The Penguin. DC Studios co-CEO James Gunn confirmed in January 2023 that Reeves' franchise would continue production under the DC Elseworlds banner, separate from the new DC Universe (DCU) franchise that succeeded the DCEU and was planned to introduce its own iteration of Batman.
- Batman Beyond: In December 2022, it was reported that a Batman Beyond film starring Michael Keaton was in development, with a script by Christina Hodson. The plot would have involved an aged Bruce Wayne, continuing the plot threads from his appearance in The Flash, and would have included Catwoman. Development on the film was shelved after Gunn and Safran were appointed as co-heads of DC Studios. In January 2023, Gunn and Safran said that there is potential for a future multiverse project in which they may incorporate Keaton's incarnation of Batman.
- Untitled Black Adam sequel: In April 2017, Dwayne Johnson stated that DC Films planned on Black Adam and Shazam appearing in a future film together. In October 2022, Johnson confirmed future plans for Black Adam to fight Superman in the DCEU, and reaffirmed plans for the character to crossover with Shazam. That month, producers Hiram Garcia and Beau Flynn stated that the sequel was in development, with plans to fast-track production on the project. Johnson publicly revealed that December that the character would not be a part of the initial slate of projects lined up for the new DC film universe under Gunn and Safran. He added that both DC Studios and his production company Seven Bucks Productions would continue collaborating in the future, and that the studio intended to "continue exploring the most valuable ways Black Adam can be utilized in future DC multiverse chapters".
- Black Canary: By August 2021, an HBO Max-exclusive film centered around Dinah Lance / Black Canary entered development with Jurnee Smollett reprising her role from Birds of Prey, Misha Green writing the script, and Sue Kroll producing. In June 2022, the script was continuing to be written.
- Booster Gold: In September 2015, a buddy cop film centered around Mike Carter / Booster Gold and Ted Kord / Blue Beetle was announced to be in development with Greg Berlanti attached as producer. In May 2016, Zack Stentz was hired to write the script, while Berlanti expressed interest in directing the project. The script had been completed by March 2018. In November 2022, after co-CEO of DC Studios James Gunn had conducted a poll on his social media asking fans which characters they would like to see included in the franchise moving forward, the filmmaker confirmed that the most requested was Booster Gold, noting that DC Studios intends to follow what the audience is wanting. In January 2023, a similar project was revealed to be in development for the DC Universe franchise, in the form of a titular television series.
- Creature Commandos: In January 2021, Gunn revealed that he was developing ideas for more spin-off installments of The Suicide Squad, while Warner Bros. officially confirmed that there would be additional DC projects created by Gunn in August of the same year. In January 2022, Gunn confirmed he was developing another television series intended for HBO Max, while stating that the tone would be more serious than his previous work. By June of the same year, the filmmaker revealed that he will serve as writer and director for the show and confirmed that characters from Peacemaker will feature into the plot, while stating that the show is separate from the Amanda Waller project that was revealed to be in the works in May 2022. The project ultimately became an animated series, and was released as a part of the DC Universe franchise.
- Untitled Crisis on Infinite Earths film: In August 2022, when the Warner Bros. Discovery merger was completed and Walter Hamada began preparations to leave his role as President of DC Films, it was revealed that prior to these events Warner Bros. had been developing a project based on Crisis on Infinite Earths. The potential film was teased at DC FanDome in October 2021 with key art drawn by Jim Lee, depicting stitched together vignettes of characters both from the DCEU and other continuities such as Robert Pattinson's Batman. The plot would have similarly incorporated the multiverse and iterations of the main characters from alternate realities. Following Hamada's departure from the studios, the project's future realization is dependent on Gunn and Safran's plans for the franchise.
- Cyborg: In April 2014, Ray Fisher was cast as Victor Stone / Cyborg, and Warner Bros. announced a film centered around the character was in development the following October. Joe Morton was set to reprise his role as Dr. Silas Stone. Morton commented that there were discussions to include scenes involving Cyborg that were cut during post-production on the theatrical release of Justice League. Cyborg was scheduled to be released on April 3, 2020, before being delayed. In April 2020, developments continued; though by 2021, amidst a dispute between the actor and Warner Bros. Pictures regarding an investigation in the reshoot process on Justice League, Fisher stated that he would not play the role in any film that had Hamada's involvement. DC Films responded that they would recast the role. In March, Fisher said that though he is not opposed to reprising the role in future DCEU films, he would prefer Cyborg to be directed by either Snyder or Rick Famuyiwa. In February 2022, when discussing the Justice League's appearance in the final episode of Peacemaker, Gunn revealed that Cyborg did not feature in the scene due to the studio's "future" plans with the character. In October 2023, however, it was reported that no cast members from Justice League would reprise their roles in the DC Universe.
- Deadshot: By December 2016, a film centered around Floyd Lawton / Deadshot was in development, with Will Smith reprising his role from Suicide Squad. In February 2019, Smith left due to scheduling conflicts, and by April the character was written out of The Suicide Squad to allow Smith an opportunity to return in a future film. By April 2022, production on the film was delayed in favor of other projects due to the production payroll figures that Smith had requested.
- Deathstroke: In October 2017, a film centered around Slade Wilson / Deathstroke was announced to be in development with Gareth Evans attached as screenwriter and director from a story by Joe Manganiello, who was also set to reprise his role from Justice League. The project was greenlit after Evans impressed executives with his pitch. By April 2020, Evans was no longer in negotiations to work on the project, while the filmmaker described the story as a "dark" and "unforgiving" origin story, similar in style to Korean noir films. In March 2021 after numerous delays, Manganiello stated that Deathstroke had been canceled because Warner Bros. did not consider it a priority. The project was brought back into discussions with the possibility of a revival for Gunn and Safran's future plans of the DCEU in December 2022. In February 2024, Manganiello revealed that he had written a screenplay during this time, before Gunn later convinced him to let the project and role go due to the soft-reboot occurring with the DC Universe franchise. Despite this, Jim Lee approached Manganiello to create a graphic novel series based on his unproduced script.
- Untitled The Flash sequel: By October 2022, the script for a sequel to The Flash had already been completed by David Leslie Johnson-McGoldrick, with Warner Bros. anticipating a successful box office run for The Flash. The script was stated to included Keaton's iteration of Batman and Calle's Supergirl. The studio was not expected to retain Ezra Miller for future films because of the actor's various controversies and legal issues, although some Warner Bros. executives were open to continuing to work with Miller. Later that month, DC Studios co-CEOs James Gunn and Peter Safran said that until a decision was made there was potential for Miller to reprise the role in the upcoming DC Universe franchise. Gunn confirmed that The Flash would reset the continuity of the DCEU and alongside Aquaman and the Lost Kingdom, would lead into the DCU's first feature film titled Superman (2025). In June, Andy Muschietti expressed interest in featuring Eobard Thawne / Reverse-Flash, a character who was only hinted at in the first film, as an antagonist for a sequel. Though it was believed that a sequel could happen if the film could achieve financial success, financial underperformance and the announcement that no actors from the Snyder's Justice League would reprise their roles ended chances of a sequel being realized.
- Green Lantern: Originally, the 2011 Green Lantern film was planned to be the first film in a shared DC cinematic universe, but its planned sequels were canceled in September 2011 and the film was eventually left out of continuity due to its critical and financial disappointment. The film was later retroactively established to be set within the multiverse of DC media, designated as Earth-12 in the Arrowverse crossover event "Crisis on Infinite Earths".
- Green Lantern Corps: A film centered around the Green Lantern Corps was originally announced to be in development in October 2014. In January 2017, David S. Goyer and Justin Rhodes were hired to write the screenplay, based on a story written by Goyer and Geoff Johns, with Goyer intended to also serve as producer. The plot was stated to feature various members of the titular team, with Hal Jordan and John Stewart planned to be the lead characters, while Warner Bros. described the film as "Lethal Weapon in space". By June 2018, Geoff Johns was hired to do a rewrite on the script in addition to serving as producer, stating that the script at that time was influenced by his work on the New 52 Green Lantern comics. In July 2019, Christopher McQuarrie stated that he had worked on a pitch over a year prior, where the story would have connected to the Man of Steel sequel that was also in development, explaining that he had since moved on to other projects due to what he perceived as no further movement by Warner Bros. to proactively develop the film. By November 2019, Johns was expected to deliver his script to Warner Bros. before the end of the year. During the development of Zack Snyder's Justice League, John Stewart / Green Lantern was removed from the film due to the studio already having other plans for character. Green Lantern Corps was originally scheduled for a July 24, 2020, release, though it was later delayed and scheduled for a tentative release in Warner Bros. Pictures 2022–2023 schedule. A similar project was later announced as a part of the DC Universe franchise titled, Lanterns.
- Gotham City Sirens: A film based on the Gotham City Sirens (a team consisting of Harley Quinn, Catwoman, and Poison Ivy) was in development by December 2016, with David Ayer signed on as director and co-producer from a script by Geneva Robertson-Dworet. Margot Robbie and Jared Leto were set to reprise their roles of Quinn and the Joker from Suicide Squad, with Robbie also taking the role of an executive producer. The film's development was later postponed in favor of Birds of Prey. In January 2020, Ayer confirmed that the project was still in development, while Robbie stated that Birds of Prey took priority, as she chose to first to introduce audiences to other lesser-known characters. She also stated that she was still "pushing" forward with Gotham City Sirens, and expressed hope of exploring the dynamics of the characters on screen. In 2022, Robbie revealed that there were plans for the character to return in the franchise, and stated that she was continuing to advocate for a romantic relationship to be portrayed between Quinn and Ivy.
- Harley Quinn vs. The Joker: By July 2017, a film featuring Harley Quinn and the Joker was in development with the working title of Harley Quinn vs. the Joker, scheduled to begin production after the completion of The Suicide Squad. Glenn Ficarra and John Requa were hired as co-writers, co-directors, and co-producers. In September 2018, the script was completed and submitted to Warner Bros. with principal photography intended to commence after the release of Birds of Prey. The film was canceled in February 2019.
- Hourman: In March 2021, a film centered around the character of Hourman was announced as being in development, after a similar project had previously been considered in 2013 for a television series on The CW. Written by Gavin James and Neil Widener, the project was intended to continue plans of expanding the franchise with lesser-known characters.
- John Constantine: In February 2021, a television series focusing on John Constantine entered development at HBO Max. The series, featuring a young Constantine in contemporary London, was planned to be horror-oriented and would tie in with Justice League Dark. Guy Bolton was hired to write the pilot, while J. J. Abrams was attached as an executive producer. The creatives involved were determined to have a diverse cast pool, and looked to the non-white actors for the lead role. By August 2022, production was tentatively scheduled to commence in early-2023. In September of the same year after four episodes of the series were written, the show was no longer moving forward at HBO Max, in favor of the studio's intentions of developing a sequel film to Constantine (2005). In October, the series was confirmed to still be in development and was being shopped around to other streaming services.
- Untitled Joker film: In June 2018, a film featuring the Joker entered development with Jared Leto attached as an executive producer in addition to reprising his titular role as the Joker. Though Leto was also initially involved with hiring the film's production crew, the film was canceled by February of the following year; a film set within another universe was released in 2019, and was later designated a part of the DC Elseworlds franchise.
- Untitled Justice League sequel: In October 2014, Justice League Part Two was announced, with Zack Snyder returning as director. Deborah Snyder later revealed that Justice League would not be one film split into two parts. The film was scheduled to be released on June 14, 2019, but production was pushed back to accommodate The Batman. Joss Whedon, the director of Justice League's reshoots, would eventually rework one of the film's post-credit scenes to tease the Injustice League as villains of a possible sequel. In October 2017, J. K. Simmons stated that work on the script was in-progress, while in December, Variety reported that there were "no immediate plans" for Snyder to return as director. By 2019, Warner Bros. had prioritized standalone films over the project. WarnerMedia CEO Ann Sarnoff stated in March 2021 that Zack Snyder's Justice League was considered "a storytelling cul-de-sac" by the studio, with no sequels planned. In August, producer Charles Roven confirmed the studio's interest in a Justice League sequel, but added that it was still "a number of years away". A sequel was once again under consideration while Michael De Luca and Pamela Abdy were in charge of DC Films, before Gunn and Safran took over. The Wall Street Journal reported in July 2025 that DC Studios was planning to eventually develop a Justice League film set in the new DC Universe (DCU) franchise, while the DCU film Superman introduced a prototype team known as the "Justice Gang."
- Justice League Dark: In January 2013, Guillermo del Toro began developing a film centered on the Justice League Dark and submitted a script in November 2014, but was no longer attached by June 2015. In August 2016, Doug Liman joined to direct with the title Dark Universe, alongside Scott Rudin producing and Michael Gilio rewriting the script. Liman left the following May due to scheduling conflicts. In mid-2017, it was retitled Justice League Dark with Gerard Johnstone polishing the script. By April 2020, the project was redeveloped as a series for HBO Max, with J. J. Abrams serving as an executive producer. Justice League Dark was intended to premiere after the individual team members were introduced in their own series, with the studios involved inspired to a similar approach as Marvel Television's Netflix series individually premiering before crossing over in The Defenders (2017). By February 2023, the series was no longer moving forward.
- Krypton: In October 2014, Man of Steel writer David S. Goyer was attached to develop a television series focused on the planet Krypton. During the development, Goyer revealed that the series would use unused concepts for the planet that were created for Man of Steel. In early marketing materials for the series and the first teaser that debuted at the 2017 San Diego Comic-Con, the Superman logo designed for the DCEU films was used to represent the House of El, implying that the series would have been a direct prequel to Man of Steel. During the casting process, the production crew sought an actor who resembled a young Henry Cavill to portray Seg-El, Superman's grandfather, while Goyer stated that the series was planned to take place 200 years prior to the events of Man of Steel. Ultimately, all connections to Man of Steel were dropped by the series' release in March 2018. Executive producer Cameron Welsh later described the series as "adjacent" to both the DCEU and the Arrowverse.
- Lobo: In September 2009, a film centered around Lobo was in development. Guy Ritchie and Brad Peyton were attached to direct at different times, while Dwayne Johnson was originally intended to star. After various iterations, in 2016, Jason Fuchs was hired as screenwriter. By February 2018, Michael Bay was attached to direct. Fuchs rewrote the script at Bay's request so the budget could be considerably lowered. In November 2022, Jason Momoa revealed that under the direction of Gunn and Safran, a project that he categorized as a "dream come true" was in development, which included his favorite comic book character. The project was later reported to be Lobo. In January 2023, Gunn and Safran addressed Momoa's involvement with future adaptations of the character, while stating that the actor would not portray two characters in the franchise.
- Madame X: In June 2021, a series focusing on Madame Xanadu entered development at HBO Max. Angela Robinson was attached to write and executive produce the series along with J.J. Abrams. The series was planned to tie in with Justice League Dark. By September 2022, the project was dropped by HBO Max and was being shopped around to other streaming services.
- Untitled Man of Steel sequel: By October 2014, a sequel to Man of Steel was in development, with Henry Cavill set to reprise his role. Matthew Vaughn had discussions with the studio to direct the film in 2017, but after two years, the talks with Warner Bros. ended in March and Vaughn left the film. Shortly after in July, Christopher McQuarrie said that he and Cavill had pitched a sequel idea to Warner Bros. over a year prior, with the plot having ties to Green Lantern Corps, but he moved on to other projects due to what he perceived as no movement on the films. Later, Michael B. Jordan had pitched his own take on the character, but was not ready to commit due to an already busy schedule. By November, Warner Bros. had entered negotiations with J. J. Abrams about taking control of the project. The film was no longer in active development by May 2020, but Cavill entered negotiations to reprise the role in a different film. Snyder later stated that his plans for the plot had included Brainiac and the Kryptonians who were banished to the Phantom Zone at the end of Man of Steel. In 2022, after Cavill reprised his role in Black Adam, a film centered around his iteration of Superman was back in active development, intended to serve as the first film focusing solely on the character since Man of Steel. Charles Roven was hired as producer at that time, with a story pitch written by Steven Knight. The studio was actively searching for a director. Cavill confirmed in October that he would reprise the role in multiple future installments, but later in December, while De Luca and Abdy had worked closely with Cavill to announce his return as Superman, Gunn and Safran instead opted to develop a film with the character at a younger age. Cavill confirmed that he would no longer play Superman. Gunn and Safran optioned to move ahead with Superman as a part of the DC Universe franchise instead.
- The Metal Men: In April 2007, a film centered around the Metal Men entered development with Eric Champnella as screenwriter; Lauren Shuler Donner and Jack Leslie also joined as producers. In May 2012, Barry Sonnenfeld entered negotiations with Warner Bros. to direct the film and was hired the next month. DC Entertainment president Diane Nelson reiterated in 2013 the company's intentions to make the film. The development was in limbo for several years until October 2021, when Sonnenfeld revealed that the film's story was still being written. In November 2022, Gunn confirmed that he and Safran had plans for the team in the future of the franchise. The Metal Men's creator, Will Magnus, appeared in the HBO Max animated series Creature Commandos, the first installment of the new DC Universe (DCU) franchise, voiced by Alan Tudyk.
- New Gods: In March 2018, Ava DuVernay signed on to direct a film centered around the New Gods. Initially with a script written by Kario Salem, Tom King was later brought to co-write the film with DuVernay. Darkseid was planned to be the main antagonist of the film, and the Female Furies were set to appear. The fourth draft of the script was ongoing in 2020. In December, DuVernay said that the COVID-19 pandemic had given her and King time to dig into "the mind and musings of Jack Kirby". New Gods was canceled in April 2021, though Warner Bros. stated that it could be revived in the future. According to The Hollywood Reporter, the project faced difficulties due to Darkseid's role in Zack Snyder's Justice League, and Warner Bros. wanted time to pass before the character appeared again. Later, DuVernay revealed that Mister Miracle, Big Barda, Granny Goodness, and Highfather would have appeared in the film.
- Nightwing: By February 2017, a film centered around Dick Grayson / Nightwing was in development, with Chris McKay and Bill Dubuque signed on as director and screenwriter, respectively. Although the script was nearing its final draft, McKay said in June 2021 that the project was delayed due to DC having "other priorities", but also reaffirmed his intentions to still make the film. He also said that the film could possibly be reworked to remove its connections to the DCEU continuity. In August 2023, the project was canceled.
- Untitled Black Manta film: In February 2019, Warner Bros. announced a horror-themed spin-off from Aquaman focusing on the villainous Trench kingdom. Safran and James Wan were set to produce, with Noah Gardner and Aidan Fitzgerald writing the script. The film was planned to have a lower production budget than other DCEU films. The film was expected to be released before Aquaman and the Lost Kingdom. In April 2021, the project was canceled, though Warner Bros. said that it may be revived in the future. In October, Wan revealed that the initially announced name of The Trench was a working title, to misdirect the audience that the movie was secretly a Black Manta film.
- Plastic Man: By December 2018, a comedy-action adventure film based on Plastic Man was in development with Amanda Idoko hired to write the script. In December 2020, Cat Vasko was hired to do a rewrite of Idoko's screenplay, with the project reworked to be a female-centered film.
- Static Shock: At DC FanDome held in August 2020, a live-action film centered around Static was revealed to be in development, with Michael B. Jordan joining the production team as a producer alongside Reginald Hudlin in October. Walter Hamada described the film as a project that could be developed as an HBO Max-exclusive film. In March 2021, Randy McKinnon was hired as screenwriter.
- Supergirl: In August 2018, a film centered around Kara Zor-El / Supergirl, was announced to be in development with Oren Uziel penning the script. In February 2021, Sasha Calle was officially cast in the role, with the character debuting in The Flash. A similar project was later announced and released as a part of the DC Universe franchise titled Supergirl, starring Milly Alcock in the titular role, and written by Ana Nogueira.
- Untitled Val-Zod television series: By July 2021, a limited series centered around Val-Zod was in development for HBO Max. Michael B. Jordan was set to produce the series and also potentially star, while Darnell Metayer and Josh Peters were attached to write. Jordan previously pitched a feature film centered around an African-American Superman, only to place development on hold due to his busy production schedule.
- Waller: In January 2021, Gunn revealed that he was developing additional spin-off installments to The Suicide Squad alongside Warner Bros. Entertainment, and further clarified his intentions to develop the projects the following year in February. By May of the same year, it was revealed that a spin-off continuation television series of Peacemaker was in development, which will center around the character of Amanda Waller. Viola Davis was announced to be reprising her role from other DCEU media, in addition to serving as an executive producer on the show. Christal Henry will serve as writer, in addition to executive producing alongside James Gunn and Peter Safran. The project was later repositioned as a part of the DC Universe franchise.
- The Wonder Twins: In February 2022, a film centered around Zan and Jayne / the Wonder Twins entered development for HBO Max. Adam Sztykiel was slated to make his directorial debut and write the screenplay, with Marty Bowen and Wyck Godfrey serving as producers. By that April, KJ Apa and Isabel May were cast in the lead roles of Zan and Jayna, respectively. Principal photography was scheduled to commence in Atlanta, Georgia in July, but the project was canceled in May following WarnerMedia's merge with Discovery Inc. and the creation of Warner Bros. Discovery. The CEO of the newly formed conglomerate, David Zaslav, felt that the film's estimated $75 million-plus budget would not bolster enough of a return as a straight-to-streaming release. Additionally, Zaslav has a directive mandate that DC Films will first focus on theatrical releases, with internal criticism also stating that the project was conceived in a style deemed "too niche".
- Wonder Woman 1854: In April 2024, Zack Snyder revealed that initially there had been plans to have the character of Wonder Woman in a project with the title of Wonder Woman 1854. Snyder explained that the photograph which Bruce Wayne discovers during the events of Justice League was the story that was intended to be explored first, depicting the character's continued search for her villainous uncle Ares throughout various time periods of history, and the romantic relationships she had while living as an immortal who does not age. The filmmaker stated that the image was intended to give the audience of glimpse of her time fighting in the Crimean War, while crediting Stephen Berkman with arranging the behind-the-scenes layout of the image. Further elaborating, Snyder stated that Wonder Woman's story in the DCEU would have shown her traveling to anywhere in history where there was conflict with the intent of ending Ares' influence on mankind. After the success of the 2017 titular film however, the decision was made to create a sequel instead of another prequel.
- Untitled Wonder Woman 1984 sequel: After principal photography on Wonder Woman 1984 was completed, director and co-writer Patty Jenkins said that the plot for a third Wonder Woman film had been written. She revealed that the story arc for Wonder Woman was planned over three films, with the third taking place in the present. Jenkins and Gadot planned to work on other projects before proceeding with the sequel. In 2020, Jenkins said she had stories written for two more Wonder Woman films completed. Two days after 1984 was released, a third film was officially greenlit by Warner Bros. Pictures. Jenkins was set to return as director, with a script she wrote, while Gadot was planned to reprise her role as the titular heroine. In October 2021, Gal Gadot stated that Lynda Carter would reprise her role as Asteria from 1984. A year later, Jenkins revealed that the script for the film was completed, while also stating that she had tentative plans for further installments. Filming was expected to begin in mid-2023, but in December the third film was revealed to be no longer moving forward because the script conflicted with the current plans for the DCU formulated by Gunn and Safran.
- Zatanna: In November 2018, Warner Bros. was considering developing a film based on Zatanna. By March 2021, Zatanna project was in development as an HBO Max-exclusive film, and Emerald Fennell was hired as screenwriter later that month. The film was to be produced by J. J. Abrams. By October 2022, the film was initially scrapped at HBO Max, but later began being shopped around to other streaming services.

== Expanded setting ==
In October 2014, Geoff Johns explained that DC's approach to their films and television series would be different from Marvel Studios' cinematic universe, stating that their film universe and TV universes would be kept separate within a multiverse to allow "everyone to make the best possible product, to tell the best story, to do the best world". This divide lasted until January 2020, when the DCEU was retroactively established to have connections to The CW's Arrowverse continuity via an expansion of the multiverse concept, during Part 4 of the "Crisis on Infinite Earths" crossover. Ezra Miller reprised their role as Barry Allen in a cameo appearance alongside Grant Gustin's version of the character. During their conversation, Miller's Barry gets the idea to call himself "The Flash" from his alternate self and mentions "Victor" (Ray Fisher's Cyborg). Despite their cameo, the episode did not confirm the designated Earth for the DCEU characters.

Miller's cameo opened up more possibilities for crossovers between DC films and the Arrowverse. President of DC Films, Walter Hamada, revealed that prior to "Crisis on Infinite Earths", DC had been structured in a way that the television division had to clear the use of characters with the film division. Now, the company could "really lean into this idea of [the multiverse] and acknowledge the fact there can be a Flash on TV and one in the movies, and you don't have to pick one or the other, and they both exist in this multiverse". Arrowverse creator and executive producer Greg Berlanti agreed, feeling that "moving forward, there's more opportunity to do more things like this", and was open to more film characters appearing in the Arrowverse.

In August 2020, Hamada announced plans to develop a multiverse inspired by the comics. In doing so, the studio also stated that all past, present, and future projects are a part of the same unified multiverse. The Flash director Andy Muschietti further explained that all previous adaptations of DC Comics were a part of the multiverse: "...all the cinematic iterations that we've seen before are valid... all that you've seen exists, and everything that you will see exists, in the same unified multiverse". In 2023, the DCEU version of Shazam made a cameo appearance through archival footage in the Titans season 4 episode "Dude, Where's My Gar?".

== Timeline ==
In the DCEU, the events of the films rarely explicitly make their exact years known. Man of Steel takes place after the events of Wonder Woman and Wonder Woman 1984, which are set in 1918 and 1984, respectively. Wonder Woman also has bookend scenes set in the present after the events of Batman v Superman: Dawn of Justice. The events of Batman v Superman occur 18 months after the events of Man of Steel, which follows the consequences and the emergence of aliens and metahumans such as Superman. The film concludes with the death of Superman, which is emphasized in Suicide Squad and Justice League, taking place approximately one and two years later, respectively.

Jason Momoa confirmed that Aquaman takes place right after Zack Snyder's Justice League. Aquaman is followed by Shazam!, which occurs during the Christmas season of 2018. The events of Birds of Prey are set in 2020. Shazam! Fury of the Gods is set about two years after its predecessor, but at least in 2021, because Billy Batson was fourteen in Shazam! whereas in Shazam! Fury of the Gods he is seventeen years old. The Suicide Squad is confirmed to take place in 2021. Peacemaker is set five months after the events of The Suicide Squad. In an episode of Peacemaker a newspaper page can be seen talking about the upheavals happening in Kahndaq caused by the Intergang from which it can be inferred that the events of Black Adam happen shortly after Peacemaker. Aquaman and the Lost Kingdom is set four years after the first Aquaman. The Flash is set in 2023 and 2013 of an alternative timeline where Michael Keaton is Batman. Blue Beetle is the final film in the DCEU timeline, but Xolo Maridueña will reprise his role in the DCU.

== Recurring cast and characters ==
List indicators

This section includes characters who have appeared in three or more installments.

- An empty grey cell indicates the character was not in the film.
- ^{A} indicates an appearance through archival footage or audio.
- ^{C} indicates a cameo role.
- ^{E} indicates an appearance not included in the theatrical cut.
- ^{G} indicates a guest appearance in the season.
- ^{P} indicates an appearance in onscreen photographs.
- ^{S} indicates an appearance through use of special effects.
- ^{U} indicates an uncredited appearance.

Character	Film										Television
Character	Man of Steel	Batman v Superman: Dawn of Justice	Suicide Squad films	Wonder Woman films	Justice League films	Aquaman films	Shazam films	Birds of Prey	Black Adam	The Flash	Peacemaker
Barry Allen The Flash		Ezra Miller^{C}	Ezra Miller^{C}		Ezra Miller					Ezra Miller	Ezra Miller^{U}^{G}
Arthur Curry Aquaman		Jason Momoa^{C}	Jason Momoa^{P}		Jason Momoa	Jason Momoa				Jason Momoa^{C}	Jason Momoa^{U}^{G}
Thomas Curry						Temuera Morrison				Temuera Morrison^{C}	
John Economos			Steve Agee				Steve Agee^{U}				Steve Agee
Rick Flag			Joel Kinnaman								Joel Kinnaman^{A}
George "Digger" Harkness Captain Boomerang			Jai Courtney					Jai Courtney^{P}		Jai Courtney^{S}	
Kal-El / Clark Kent Superman	Henry Cavill	Henry Cavill			Henry Cavill		Ryan Hadley^{C} (Note: These actors serve as body doubles in non-speaking roles where their faces are not shown.)		Henry Cavill^{C}	Henry Cavill^{S}	Brad Abramenko^{C}
Emilia Harcourt			Jennifer Holland				Jennifer Holland^{U}		Jennifer Holland		Jennifer Holland
Hippolyta				Connie Nielsen	Connie Nielsen						
Joker			Jared Leto		Jared Leto^{E}			John Goth^{C} Jared Leto^{A}			
J'onn J'onzz / Calvin Swanwick Martian Manhunter	Harry Lennix	Harry Lennix			Harry Lennix^{E}						
Jonathan Kent	Kevin Costner	Kevin Costner^{C}			Kevin Costner^{P}						
Martha Kent	Diane Lane	Diane Lane			Diane Lane						
Lois Lane	Amy Adams	Amy Adams			Amy Adams						
Mera					Amber Heard	Amber Heard					
Alfred Pennyworth		Jeremy Irons			Jeremy Irons					Jeremy Irons	
Diana Prince Wonder Woman		Gal Gadot		Gal Gadot	Gal Gadot		Gal Gadot^{U}			Gal Gadot^{C}	Kimberley von Ilberg^{C}
Harleen Quinzel Harley Quinn			Margot Robbie					Margot Robbie			
Shazam The Wizard							Djimon Hounsou		Djimon Honsou^{C}		
Victor Stone Cyborg		Ray Fisher^{C}			Ray Fisher						
Steve Trevor		Chris Pine^{P}		Chris Pine							
Amanda Waller			Viola Davis						Viola Davis^{U}		Viola Davis^{C}
Bruce Wayne Batman		Ben Affleck	Ben Affleck^{U}		Ben Affleck					Ben Affleck^{U}	
General Zod	Michael Shannon	Michael Shannon^{S}								Michael Shannon	

== Reception ==
=== Box-office performance ===
Film	U.S. release date	Box office gross			Budget	Ref.
Film	U.S. release date	U.S. and Canada	Other territories	Worldwide	Budget	Ref.
Man of Steel	June 14, 2013	$291,045,518	$379,100,000	$670,145,518	$225 million	
Batman v Superman: Dawn of Justice	March 25, 2016	$330,360,194	$544,002,609	$874,362,803	$250 million	
Suicide Squad	August 5, 2016	$325,100,054	$424,100,000	$749,200,054	$175 million	
Wonder Woman	June 2, 2017	$412,845,172	$411,125,510	$823,970,682	$149 million	
Justice League	November 17, 2017	$229,024,295	$432,302,692	$661,326,987	$300 million	
Aquaman	December 21, 2018	$335,104,314	$816,924,079	$1,152,028,393	$160 million	
Shazam!	April 5, 2019	$140,480,049	$227,318,962	$367,799,011	$100 million	
Birds of Prey	February 7, 2020	$84,172,791	$121,200,000	$205,372,791	$82 million	
Wonder Woman 1984	December 25, 2020	$46,801,036	$122,800,000	$169,601,036	$200 million	
The Suicide Squad	August 6, 2021	$55,817,425	$112,900,000	$168,717,425	$185 million	
Black Adam	October 21, 2022	$168,152,111	$225,300,000	$393,452,111	$190 million	
Shazam! Fury of the Gods	March 17, 2023	$57,638,006	$76,500,000	$134,138,006	$125 million	
The Flash	June 16, 2023	$108,133,313	$163,300,000	$271,433,313	$200 million	
Blue Beetle	August 18, 2023	$72,488,072	$58,300,000	$130,788,072	$104 million	
Aquaman and the Lost Kingdom	December 22, 2023	$124,481,226	$315,700,000	$439,381,226	$205 million	
Total		$2,781,643,576	$4,430,873,852	$7,212,517,428	$2.650 billion	

=== Critical and public response ===
Critical and public response of DC Extended Universe films
Title	Critical		Public	
Title	Rotten Tomatoes	Metacritic	CinemaScore	PostTrak
Man of Steel	56% (343 reviews)	55 (47 reviews)	A−	—N/a
Batman v Superman: Dawn of Justice	28% (437 reviews)	44 (51 reviews)	B	73%
Suicide Squad	26% (393 reviews)	40 (53 reviews)	B+	73%
Wonder Woman	93% (476 reviews)	76 (50 reviews)	A	85%
Justice League	39% (411 reviews)	45 (52 reviews)	B+	85%
Aquaman	66% (411 reviews)	55 (50 reviews)	A–	—N/a
Shazam!	90% (418 reviews)	71 (53 reviews)	A	83%
Birds of Prey	79% (450 reviews)	60 (59 reviews)	B+	—N/a
Wonder Woman 1984	57% (455 reviews)	60 (58 reviews)	B+	78%
Zack Snyder's Justice League	71% (313 reviews)	54 (46 reviews)	—N/a	—N/a
The Suicide Squad	90% (384 reviews)	72 (55 reviews)	B+	83%
Black Adam	39% (306 reviews)	41 (52 reviews)	B+	—N/a
Shazam! Fury of the Gods	49% (264 reviews)	47 (50 reviews)	B+	78%
The Flash	63% (388 reviews)	55 (55 reviews)	B	77%
Blue Beetle	78% (277 reviews)	61 (52 reviews)	B+	82%
Aquaman and the Lost Kingdom	33% (212 reviews)	42 (43 reviews)	B	69%

Critical response of DC Extended Universe series
Title	Season	Rotten Tomatoes	Metacritic
Peacemaker	1	93% (91 reviews)	70 (26 reviews)

=== Accolades ===
Titles in the DCEU have won an Academy Award and been nominated for three Annie Awards, seven Critics' Choice Movie Awards (winning two), 13 Critics' Choice Super Awards (winning two), 12 Golden Raspberry (winning four), five Grammy Awards, two Hugo Awards (winning one), three Golden Reel Awards, 14 MTV Movie & TV Awards (winning two), one Primetime Creative Arts Emmy Award, 35 Saturn Awards (winning one), and eight Visual Effects Society Awards, among others.

== Music ==
=== Soundtracks ===
Title	U.S. release date	Performed by	Length	Label
Man of Steel: Original Motion Picture Soundtrack	June 11, 2013	Hans Zimmer	87:49; 118:18 (Deluxe Edition)	WaterTower Music
Batman v Superman: Dawn of Justice – Original Motion Picture Soundtrack	March 18, 2016	Hans Zimmer; Junkie XL	71:35; 90:27 (Deluxe Edition)	WaterTower Music
Suicide Squad: The Album	August 5, 2016	Various artists	50:57; 60:49 (Collector Edition)	Atlantic
Suicide Squad: Original Motion Picture Score	August 5, 2016	Steven Price	72:33; 93:38 (Digital Edition)	WaterTower Music
Wonder Woman: Original Motion Picture Soundtrack	June 2, 2017	Rupert Gregson-Williams	78:38	WaterTower Music
Justice League: Original Motion Picture Soundtrack	November 10, 2017	Danny Elfman	101:22	WaterTower Music
Aquaman: Original Motion Picture Soundtrack	December 14, 2018	Rupert Gregson-Williams	65:02	WaterTower Music
Shazam!: Original Motion Picture Soundtrack	April 5, 2019	Benjamin Wallfisch	73:13	WaterTower Music
Birds of Prey: The Album	February 7, 2020	Various artists	42:52	Atlantic
Birds of Prey (and the Fantabulous Emancipation of One Harley Quinn) – Original Motion Picture Score	February 14, 2020	Daniel Pemberton	62:52	WaterTower Music
Wonder Woman 1984: Original Motion Picture Soundtrack	December 16, 2020	Hans Zimmer	90:23	WaterTower Music
Wonder Woman 1984: Sketches from the Soundtrack	February 5, 2021	Hans Zimmer	72:27	WaterTower Music
Zack Snyder's Justice League: Original Motion Picture Soundtrack	March 18, 2021	Tom Holkenborg	234:09	WaterTower Music
The Suicide Squad: Original Motion Picture Soundtrack	August 6, 2021	Various artists	45:25	WaterTower Music
The Suicide Squad: Score from Original Motion Picture Soundtrack	August 6, 2021	John Murphy	50:58	WaterTower Music
Peacemaker: Soundtrack from the Series	February 18, 2022	Kevin Kiner; Clint Mansell	70:00	WaterTower Music
Black Adam: Original Motion Picture Soundtrack	October 21, 2022	Lorne Balfe	109:00	WaterTower Music
Shazam! Fury of the Gods (Original Motion Picture Soundtrack)	March 10, 2023	Christophe Beck	60:25	WaterTower Music
The Flash: Original Motion Picture Soundtrack	June 16, 2023	Benjamin Wallfisch	83:31	WaterTower Music
Blue Beetle: Original Motion Picture Soundtrack	August 18, 2023	Bobby Krlic	86:04	WaterTower Music
Aquaman and the Lost Kingdom: Original Motion Picture Soundtrack	December 22, 2023	Rupert Gregson-Williams	52:29	WaterTower Music

=== Singles ===
Singles for DC Extended Universe films
Title	U.S. release date	Length	Artist(s)	Label	Film
"Heathens"	June 16, 2016	3:15	Twenty One Pilots	Atlantic	Suicide Squad
"Sucker for Pain"	June 24, 2016	4:03	Lil Wayne, Wiz Khalifa, Imagine Dragons, Logic and Ty Dolla Sign featuring X Ambassadors	Atlantic	Suicide Squad
"Purple Lamborghini"	July 22, 2016	3:35	Skrillex and Rick Ross	Atlantic	Suicide Squad
"Gangsta"	August 1, 2016	2:57	Kehlani	Atlantic	Suicide Squad
"To Be Human"	May 25, 2017	4:01	Sia featuring Labrinth	WaterTower Music	Wonder Woman
"Come Together"	September 8, 2017	3:13	Gary Clark Jr. and Junkie XL	WaterTower Music	Justice League
"Everybody Knows"	November 10, 2017	4:26	Sigrid	WaterTower Music	Justice League
"Everything I Need"	December 14, 2018	3:16	Skylar Grey	WaterTower Music	Aquaman
"Ocean to Ocean"	December 14, 2018	2:25	Pitbull featuring Rhea	WaterTower Music	Aquaman
"Diamonds"	January 10, 2020	3:19	Megan Thee Stallion and Normani	Atlantic	Birds of Prey
"Joke's on You"	January 17, 2020	3:04	Charlotte Lawrence	Atlantic	Birds of Prey
"Boss Bitch"	January 24, 2020	2:14	Doja Cat	Atlantic	Birds of Prey
"Sway With Me"	January 31, 2020	2:48	Saweetie and GALXARA	Atlantic	Birds of Prey
"Experiment On Me"	February 7, 2020	3:35	Halsey	Atlantic	Birds of Prey
"Sway With Me" (GALXARA version)	May 1, 2020	2:33	GALXARA	Atlantic	Birds of Prey
"Rain"	June 22, 2021	3:56	Grandson and Jessie Reyez	Atlantic	The Suicide Squad
"Oh No!!!" (The Suicide Squad version)	July 2, 2021	3:33	Grandson, Vic Mensa and Masked Wolf	Atlantic	The Suicide Squad
"Deep End"	November 17, 2023	3:00	X Ambassadors	WaterTower Music	Aquaman and the Lost Kingdom

Singles for DC Extended Universe television series
Title	U.S. release date	Length	Artist(s)	Label	Television
"Pumped Up Kicks"	January 9, 2022	3:26	John Murphy featuring Ralph Saenz	WaterTower Music	Peacemaker
"Home Sweet Home" (piano version)	February 4, 2022	2:06	John Cena	WaterTower Music	Peacemaker

== Other media ==
=== Novels ===
Title	Publication date(s)	Writer(s)	Note
Man of Steel: The Early Years: Junior Novel	April 30, 2013	Frank Whitman	Tie-in children's book to Man of Steel.
Man of Steel: The Official Movie Novelization	June 18, 2013	Greg Cox	Novelization of the film.
Batman v Superman: Dawn of Justice – Cross Fire	February 16, 2016	Michael Kogge	Tie-in prequel novel to Batman v Superman: Dawn of Justice.
Suicide Squad: The Official Movie Novelization	August 5, 2016	Marv Wolfman	Novelization of the film.
Wonder Woman: The Junior Novel	May 30, 2017	Steve Korte	Novelization of the film.
Wonder Woman: The Official Movie Novelization	June 6, 2017	Nancy Holder	Novelization of the film.
Aquaman: The Junior Novel	November 6, 2018	Jim McCann	Novelization of the film.
Aquaman: Arthur's Guide to Atlantis	November 6, 2018	Alexandra West	Guide book
Aquaman: Undertow	November 6, 2018	Steve Behling	Tie-in prequel novel to Aquaman.
Shazam!: The Junior Novel	February 26, 2019	Calliope Glass	Novelization of the film.
Shazam!: Freddy's Guide to Super Hero-ing	February 26, 2019	Steve Behling	Guide book
Wonder Woman 1984: The Junior Novel	July 7, 2020	Calliope Glass	Novelization of the film.
Wonder Woman 1984: Truth, Love & Wonder	July 7, 2020	Alexandra West	Quotes book

=== Comics ===
Title	Issue(s)	Publication date(s)	Writer(s)	Artist(s)	Notes
Man of Steel – Prequel	1	May 18, 2013	Sterling Gates	Jerry Ordway	Promotional digital prequel comic from Walmart.
Batman v Superman: Dawn of Justice	5	January 28, 2016	Christos Gage	Joe Bennet	Promotional digital prequel comics from Dr Pepper.
Batman v Superman: Dawn of Justice	4	February 28, 2016	Jeff Parker, Christos Gage, Marguerite Bennett, and Joshua Williamson	R. B. Silva, Federico Dallochio, Marcus To, and Eduardo Pansica	Promotional prequel mini-comics that appeared in select General Mills cereal.
Batman v Superman: Dawn of Justice – Upstairs/Downstairs	1	February 29, 2016	Christos Gage	Joe Bennet	Promotional prequel digital comic from Doritos and Walmart.
Suicide Squad: Suicide Blonde	1	June 2, 2016	Tony Bedard	Tom Derenick, Juan Albarran, Hi-Fi, and Lori Jackson	Promotional prequel comic from Splat Hair Dye.
Mercedes-Benz Presents: Justice League	6	October 20, 2017 – November 15, 2017	Adam Schlagman	Jason Badower	Promotional digital comic from Mercedes-Benz.
Wonder Woman 1984: Museum Mayhem	1	September 29, 2020	Anna Obropta, Louise Simonson, and Steve Pugh	Bret Blevins and Marguerite Sauvage	One-shot comic featuring a prequel story and a second story unrelated to the DCEU.
Serving Up Justice	4	September 21, 2021 – January 27, 2022	Amanda Diebert	Cat Staggs	Promotional digital comic from DirecTV.
Black Adam – The Justice Society Files	4	July 5, 2022 – October 4, 2022	Cavan Scott and Bryan Q. Miller	Eaton, Sanapo, Mercer, Merino, Santucci, Prianto, Carey, Kalisz, Atiyeh and Arreola; covers by Kaare	Prelude comics to Black Adam feature film.
The Flash: The Fastest Man Alive	3	September 13, 2022 – November 8, 2022	Kenny Porter	Ricardo López Ortiz, Juan Ferreyra and Jason Howard	Prelude comics to The Flash feature film.
Shazam! Fury of the Gods Special: Shazamily Matters	1	February 28, 2023	Zachary Levi, D. J. Cotrona, Colleen Doran, Faithe Herman, Amanda Heibert, Tim Seeley, David F. Sandberg, Scott Kolins, Ross Butler, Josh Trujillo, Grace Caroline Currey, Adam Brody, Kenny Porter and Henry Gayden	Freddie Williams II, Erica Henderson, Jorge Corona, Scott Kolins, Andrew Drilon, Damian Fulton, Mike Norton and Scott Godlewski	Tie-in comic to Shazam! Fury of the Gods feature film.
Shazam! Thundercrack	1	March 1, 2023	Yehudi Mercado	Yehudi Mercado	A middle-grade graphic novel set in the continuity of the two Shazam films.
Aquaman and the Lost Kingdom Special	1	October 31, 2023	Tim Seeley, Joey Esposito, Ethan Sacks, Rafael López	Miguel Mendonça, Ray-Anthony Height, Scot Eaton, Norm Rapmund, Tony Avina, Andrew Dalhouse, Eren Angiolini	Tie-in comic consisting of three original stories set within the canon of the DCEU.

=== Video games ===
Title	Release date(s)	Publisher(s)	Notes
Man of Steel	June 14, 2013	Warner Bros. International Enterprises	
Kellogg's Man of Steel	April 19, 2013	Catapult Marketing	
Batman vs Superman – Who Will Win?	March 16, 2016	Warner Bros. International Enterprises	Endless runner
Suicide Squad: Special Ops	July 19, 2016	Warner Bros. International Enterprises	First-person shooter
Wonder Woman: Rise of the Warrior	May 23, 2017	Warner Bros. International Enterprises	Endless runner
Justice League VR: The Complete Experience	December 5, 2017	Warner Bros. International Enterprises	Virtual reality

=== Podcast ===
Title	Release date	Director
The Flash: Escape the Midnight Circus	July 10, 2023	Henry Loevner

== Reboot ==
In January 2023, Gunn and Safran announced the initial ten installments for the DCU, which make up a portion of the slate subtitled "Chapter One: Gods and Monsters". They included the films Superman (2025), The Authority, The Brave and the Bold, Supergirl, and Swamp Thing, as well as the television series Waller, Creature Commandos, Lanterns, Paradise Lost, and Booster Gold. The duo were open to DCEU actors such as Miller, Gadot, Momoa, and Levi reprising their respective roles, though Gunn clarified that Superman would serve as the start of the new continuity, with the DCU being able to change events from the DCEU, with the DCEU properties serving "like a rough memory of what happens in the DCU". The Flash film would be used to reset some aspects of the universe heading into the DCU. Peacemaker season 2 would be set in the new continuity. In October 2023, Variety reported that no actors from Snyder's DCEU films would reprise their roles in the DCU.

== See also ==
- List of films based on DC Comics publications
- List of television series based on DC Comics publications
- Development of the DC Extended Universe

=== Related franchises ===
- DC Animated Universe
- DC Universe Animated Original Movies
  - DC Animated Movie Universe
- Arrowverse
- DC Universe
