= Wonder Woman 1984 (soundtrack) =

Wonder Woman 1984 (Original Motion Picture Soundtrack)

Soundtrack album by Hans Zimmer
- Released: December 16, 2020
- Recorded: 2020
- Genre: Soundtrack
- Length: 90:23
- Label: WaterTower
- Producer: Hans Zimmer

Hans Zimmer chronology
Hillbilly Elegy (2020)	Wonder Woman 1984 (Original Motion Picture Soundtrack) (2020)	The SpongeBob Movie: Sponge on the Run (2021)

Wonder Woman 1984 (Original Motion Picture Soundtrack) is the soundtrack to the film of the same name. The music is composed and arranged by Hans Zimmer. It was released on December 16, 2020, by WaterTower Music.

== Background ==
Hans Zimmer was composer for Wonder Woman in 1984, replacing Rupert Gregson-Williams who scored the first film. Zimmer previously scored Man of Steel and Batman v Superman: Dawn of Justice, the first and second films in the DC Extended Universe, and the latter of which also featured Wonder Woman. David Fleming and Steve Mazzaro provided additional music.

As part of DC FanDome 2020, WaterTower Music released the first track from the score, titled "Themyscira". Another track, "Open Road", was released on December 10 as part of the "Week of Wonder" social media promotion leading up to the film's release.

A variation of the song "Beautiful Lie" from Batman v Superman, composed by Zimmer and Junkie XL, was also used towards the end of the film, but is not present on the film's official soundtrack.

WaterTower released the album Wonder Woman 1984: Sketches from the Soundtrack on February 5, 2021, a compilation of eleven suites and sketches written by Zimmer for the film.

In the aerial scene where Wonder Woman learn to fly on her own, the Song "Adagio in D Minor" from the Movie "Sunshine",composed by John Murphy, is used. This Song is not included in the Original Motion Picture Soundtrack.

== Track listing ==
All music is composed by Hans Zimmer, except where noted.

Wonder Woman 1984: Original Motion Picture Soundtrack
No.	Title	Length
1.	"Themyscira"	3:51
2.	"Games"	5:17
3.	"1984"	7:04
4.	"Black Gold"	4:55
5.	"Wish We Had More Time"	2:54
6.	"The Stone"	2:13
7.	"Cheetah"	3:13
8.	"Fireworks"	2:38
9.	"Anything You Want"	4:45
10.	"Open Road"	5:36
11.	"Without Armor"	3:46
12.	"The White House"	7:45
13.	"Already Gone"	5:04
14.	"Radio Waves"	8:02
15.	"Lord of Desire"	2:44
16.	"The Beauty in What Is"	3:48
17.	"Truth"	4:45
18.	"Lost and Found" (bonus track)	11:55
Total length:		90:23

Wonder Woman 1984: Sketches from the Soundtrack
No.	Title	Length
1.	"'84"	2:28
2.	"No Hero Is Born from Lies"	4:38
3.	"Apex Predator"	5:08
4.	"The Monkey Paw"	6:49
5.	"Barbara Minerva"	1:32
6.	"Dechalafrea Ero"	11:10
7.	"In Love"	10:48
8.	"Citrine"	3:04
9.	"In Harm's Way"	5:15
10.	"Life Is Good, But It Can Be Better"	11:51
11.	"The Amazon"	9:44
Total length:		72:27

== Charts ==
Chart (2020)	Peak position
US Billboard 200	100
