= The SpongeBob Movie: Sponge on the Run (soundtrack) =

2021 soundtrack albums

The SpongeBob Movie: Sponge On The Run (Original Motion Picture Soundtrack)

Soundtrack album by Various artists
- Released: March 5, 2021
- Genre: Film soundtrack
- Length: 25:14
- Label: Nickelodeon; Interscope; NEON16
- Producer: Suzy Shinn; Ali Dee Theodore; Doug Davis; Kenny G; Steve Mazzaro; Tainy; Albert Hype; The Flaming Lips; Scott Booker

Singles from The SpongeBob Movie: Sponge On The Run (Original Motion Picture Soundtrack)
- 1. "Agua" Released: July 9, 2020; 2. "Krabby Step" Released: November 5, 2020

The SpongeBob Movie: Sponge On The Run (Music from the Motion Picture)

Film score by Hans Zimmer and Steve Mazzaro
- Released: April 9, 2021
- Recorded: 2020
- Genre: Film score
- Length: 29:53
- Label: Paramount Music
- Producer: Hans Zimmer; Steve Mazzaro

Hans Zimmer chronology
| Wonder Woman 1984 (2020) | The SpongeBob Movie: Sponge On The Run (2021) | The Boss Baby: Family Business (2021) |

Steve Mazzaro chronology
| The Rhythm Section (2020) | The SpongeBob Movie: Sponge On The Run (2021) | The Boss Baby: Family Business (2021) |

The SpongeBob Movie: Sponge On The Run (Original Motion Picture Soundtrack) and The SpongeBob Movie: Sponge On The Run (Music from the Motion Picture) are the two soundtrack albums, released for the 2020 film of the same name. The first soundtrack released by Nickelodeon Records, Interscope Records and NEON16 on March 5, 2021, features selections of original tracks performed by artists such as Becky G, Swae Lee, J Balvin, Tyga, Lil Mosey, Tainy, Weezer, Snoop Dogg, The Flaming Lips, and Kenny G. The second soundtrack, consisting of the original score composed by Hans Zimmer and Steve Mazzaro, was released on April 9, 2021.

== Background ==
On July 9, 2020, Interscope Records in collaboration with NEON16 announced the release of the soundtrack. It was preceded by the single "Agua", a reggaeton track performed by Tainy and J Balvin released on the same date as the announcement. Regarding this track, J Balvin expressed that the track "has good vibes and a lot of happiness, which we need during these moments." A music video featuring the artists released on July 15. The second single "Krabby Step" was released on November 5, 2020, performed by Swae Lee, Tyga and Lil Mosey. The soundtrack was released on March 5, 2021, a day after the film's premiere.

Hans Zimmer signed on to compose the original score in October 2018, with his protégé Steve Mazzaro serving as co-composer. It marks as Zimmer's second score for a Nickelodeon film, following Rango (2011), and his second score for a film based on an animated series, after The Simpsons Movie (2007). The score album was released by Paramount Music on April 9, 2021, followed by a CD release on April 27, 2021, through La-La Land Records.

== Track listing ==
The SpongeBob Movie: Sponge On The Run (Original Motion Picture Soundtrack)
| No. | Title | Artist(s) | Length |
|---|---|---|---|
| 1. | "Agua" | Tainy and J Balvin | 2:39 |
| 2. | "Krabby Step" | Swae Lee, Tyga and Lil Mosey | 3:18 |
| 3. | "F is For Friends" | Trevor Daniel, Becky G and Tainy | 2:51 |
| 4. | "It's Always Summer in Bikini Bottom" | Weezer | 3:11 |
| 5. | "How We Do" | Snoop Dogg and Monsta X | 2:16 |
| 6. | "Gary's Song" | Kenny G | 3:20 |
| 7. | "Secret to the Formula" | Cast | 1:53 |
| 8. | "Snail: I'm Avail" | The Flaming Lips | 3:18 |
| 9. | "Agua (film version)" | Tainy and J Balvin | 2:28 |
| Total length: | | | 25:14 |

The SpongeBob Movie: Sponge On The Run (Original Motion Picture Score)
| No. | Title | Length |
|---|---|---|
| 1. | "Bikini Bottom" | 2:08 |
| 2. | "Opening Time" | 0:48 |
| 3. | "A Diabolical Plan" | 1:08 |
| 4. | "The Royal Poseidon" | 1:50 |
| 5. | "Roadtrip" | 0:36 |
| 6. | "Goner Gulch" | 1:32 |
| 7. | "El Diablo" | 2:25 |
| 8. | "The Secret Formula Is Mine" | 1:20 |
| 9. | "After Them!" | 2:44 |
| 10. | "Friends Like These" | 1:35 |
| 11. | "Gary's Missing" | 2:03 |
| 12. | "His Name Is Fred" | 0:43 |
| 13. | "You've Got One Now" | 1:40 |
| 14. | "The Campy Award" | 1:42 |
| 15. | "Sandy's Arrival" | 0:44 |
| 16. | "Where Is He?" | 1:05 |
| 17. | "Storming the Last City" | 0:39 |
| 18. | "The Secret to the Formula" | 1:29 |
| 19. | "To the Patty Mobile" | 1:16 |
| 20. | "The Defense" | 2:26 |
| Total length: | | 29:53 |

== Additional music ==
Previous material that are part of the film but not on the soundtrack album are "Slow Ride" by Foghat, "On The Road Again" by Willie Nelson, "Dream Weaver" by Gary Wright, Weezer's cover of the a-ha song "Take On Me", and Kenny G's cover of "My Heart Will Go On" from the film Titanic and "Livin' la Vida Loca" by Ricky Martin.

== Reception ==
Filmtracks.com wrote "The SpongeBob Movie: Sponge on the Run is, like its predecessor, easy listening but insubstantial. The pandemic recording process worked, but the ambience of the music is indeed shallow. This score is much shorter than Debney's, however, and does not offer the same cohesion in thematic development."
