= Deep End =

Deep End or The Deep End may refer to:

- The deeper part of a swimming pool

== Film, television and radio ==
- Deep End (film), a 1970 German-British romantic drama directed by Jerzy Skolimowski
- Deep End, a 2023 Taiwanese web drama series starring James Wen and Peter Yu
- The Deep End (film), a 2001 American thriller by David Siegel and Scott McGehee
- The Deep End (2010 TV series), an American legal drama
- The Deep End (2022 TV series), an American documentary miniseries
- The Deep End with Nick Michaels, an American radio music program

=== Television episodes ===
- "Deep End", Merseybeat series 1, episode 1 (2001)
- "Deep End", Tagged season 3, episode 7 (2018)
- "Deep End", The Bill series 14, episode 89 (1998)
- "The Deep End", Class of the Titans season 2, episode 26 (2008)
- "The Deep End", Dance Academy season 1, episode 25 (2010)
- "The Deep End", Dr. Finlay's Casebook series 2, episode 14 (1963)
- "The Deep End", Faking It season 2, episode 19 (2015)
- "The Deep End", Gravity Falls season 1, episode 15 (2013)
- "The Deep End", He-Man and the Masters of the Universe (2002) season 1, episode 6 (2002)
- "The Deep End", Holby City series 3, episode 1 (2000)
- "The Deep End", In the Dark (American) season 4, episode 11 (2022)
- "The Deep End", Island of Bryan season 1, episode 3 (2019)
- "The Deep End", Judd, for the Defense season 1, episode 2 (1967)
- "The Deep End", Kraft Suspense Theatre season 1, episode 11 (1964)
- "The Deep End", Major Crimes season 2, episode 8 (2013)
- "The Deep End", Peter Gunn season 3, episode 22 (1961)
- "The Deep End", Robot Chicken season 1, episode 8 (2005)
- "The Deep End", Shelley series 10, episode 1 (1992)
- "The Deep End", Silk Stalkings season 3, episode 20 (1994)
- "The Deep End", The Bold Type season 3, episode 4 (2019)
- "The Deep End", The Rubbish World of Dave Spud series 3, episode 9 (2024)
- "The Deep End", The Sleepover Club series 2, episode 16 (2008)

== Literature ==
- "Deep End" (short story), a 1961 short story by J. G. Ballard
- Diary of a Wimpy Kid: The Deep End, a 2020 novel by Jeff Kinney
- The Deep End, a 1952 mystery novel by Fredric Brown
- The Deep End, a 1992 novel by Chris Crutcher

== Music ==
- Deep End (band), a 1985 British rock supergroup

=== Albums ===
- Deep End (Tsunami album), 1993
- Deep End Live!, by Deep End, 1986
- Deep End, by Isotope, 1975
- The Deep End (Madrugada album), 2005
- The Deep End (Spyro Gyra album), 2004
- The Deep End (Susanna Hoffs album) or the title song, 2023
- The Deep End, Volume 1, by Gov't Mule, 2001
- The Deep End, Volume 2, by Gov't Mule, 2002
- The Deep End, by Rupert Hine, 1994

=== Songs ===
- "Deep End" (Fousheé song), sampled in "Deep End Freestyle" by Sleepy Hollow, 2020
- "Deep End" (Oliver Tree song), 2026
- "Deep End", by Birdy from Beautiful Lies, 2016
- "Deep End", by Daughtry from Cage to Rattle, 2018
- "Deep End", by Felix (of Stray Kids) from SKZ-Replay, 2022
- "Deep End", by Holly Humberstone from Falling Asleep at the Wheel, 2020
- "Deep End", by Great Gable from Tracing Faces, 2020
- "Deep End", by I Prevail from True Power, 2022
- "Deep End", by Lil Baby from Drip Harder, 2018
- "Deep End", by Lykke Li, from So Sad So Sexy, 2018
- "Deep End", by Newsboys, from Step Up to the Microphone, 1997
- "Deep End", by Spiritbox, from Tsunami Sea, 2025
- "Deep End", by X Ambassadors, from Aquaman and the Lost Kingdom, 2023
- "Deep End (Paul's in Pieces)", by the National from Laugh Track, 2023
- "The Deep End", by Crossfade from Crossfade, 2004
- "The Deep End", by Scary Kids Scaring Kids from Scary Kids Scaring Kids, 2007
