= Army of Thieves (soundtrack) =

Army of Thieves (Soundtrack from the Netflix Film)

Film score by Hans Zimmer and Steve Mazzaro
- Released: October 29, 2021
- Genre: Film score
- Length: 68:58
- Label: Maisie Music Publishing; Milan
- Producer: Hans Zimmer; Steve Mazzaro

Hans Zimmer chronology
| No Time to Die (2021) | Army of Thieves (2021) | The Unforgivable (2021) |

Steve Mazzaro chronology
| The Boss Baby: Family Business (2021) | Army of Thieves (2021) | The Volcano: Rescue from Whakaari (2022) |

Army of Thieves (Soundtrack from the Netflix Film) is the soundtrack to the 2021 film Army of Thieves directed by Matthias Schweighöfer. Featuring musical score composed and arranged by Hans Zimmer and Steve Mazzaro, the score was released by Milan Records and Maisie Music Publishing in conjunction with the film's streaming release, October 29, 2021.

== Development ==
In August 2021, Schweighöfer took to Twitter to announce that Hans Zimmer would score music for the film. He joined the film during post-production stage, and Schweighöfer and editor Alexander Berner suggested editing the film without music. The film's co-producer Deborah Snyder said that Zimmer himself phoned the crew to watch the film and contribute to the music as well. Due to the time constraints, one of Zimmer's protégés Steve Mazzaro co-scored the film. The duo produced a blend of classical and modern soundscapes consisting drums, synths and orchestral music.

== Track listing ==
| No. | Title | Artist(s) | Length |
|---|---|---|---|
| 1. | "Army of Thieves" | | 2:08 |
| 2. | "The Test" | | 5:25 |
| 3. | "Hans Wagner" | | 2:40 |
| 4. | "Good Samaritan" | | 1:17 |
| 5. | "A Life Less Ordinary" | | 3:11 |
| 6. | "Cathouse" | | 5:08 |
| 7. | "Here's the Plan" | | 2:09 |
| 8. | "Warming Up My Instruments" | | 2:18 |
| 9. | "It's Already Done" | | 1:26 |
| 10. | "Interpol" | | 2:41 |
| 11. | "Longing for More" | | 3:08 |
| 12. | "The Robbing of a Bank" | | 1:58 |
| 13. | "Creating a Diversion" | | 2:51 |
| 14. | "Safecracker Extraordinaire" | | 4:05 |
| 15. | "According to Plan" | | 1:56 |
| 16. | "That's My Bike" | | 4:37 |
| 17. | "Long Walk Home" | | 1:05 |
| 18. | "Transferring the Safe" | | 2:53 |
| 19. | "Gwendoline" | | 1:03 |
| 20. | "Escape in Switzerland" | | 4:34 |
| 21. | "Ludwig Dieter" | | 7:49 |
| 22. | "Firewall" | Stephanie Olmanni | 2:34 |
| 23. | "Goin' Crazy" | Olmanni | 2:02 |
| Total length: | | | 68:58 |

== Reception ==
Calling it as "a thoroughly enjoyable album", James Southall of Movie Wave assigned three-and-a-half of five stars, saying "The more heavy-duty, serious action material towards the end of the score [...] doesn't do as much for me, but otherwise – while clearly this is not a major work – it's all pulled together very well". Filmtracks.com gave three stars to the album, saying " a little patience may be required to appreciate the smart narrative of Army of Thieves, and it definitely requires a particular mood from the listener." David Rooney of The Hollywood Reporter described it as "a jaunty score by Hans Zimmer and Steve Mazzaro that turns suspenseful in appropriate moments", Benjamin Lee of The Guardian and Noel Murray of Los Angeles Times called it as "grand" and "powerhouse". Mimi Anthikkad Chibber of The Hindu wrote "The music of Army of Thieves reflects its Snyder pedigree [...] Hans Zimmer has created a peppy opera-infused score that has Wagner trending — Inspector Morse will surely be pleased."
