= The Boss Baby: Family Business (soundtrack) =

2021 soundtrack album

The Boss Baby: Family Business (Original Motion Picture Soundtrack)

Soundtrack album by Hans Zimmer and Steve Mazzaro
- Released: July 2, 2021
- Recorded: 2020–2021
- Studios: Air Studios, London; Remote Control Productions, Santa Monica, California; Soho Lofts, London
- Genres: Film soundtrack; film score
- Length: 69:40
- Label: Back Lot Music
- Producers: Hans Zimmer; Steve Mazzaro

Hans Zimmer chronology
The SpongeBob Movie: Sponge on the Run (2021)	The Boss Baby: Family Business (2021)	Dune (2021)

Steve Mazzaro chronology
The SpongeBob Movie: Sponge on the Run (2021)	The Boss Baby: Family Business (2021)	Army of Thieves (2021)

The Boss Baby: Family Business (Original Motion Picture Soundtrack) is the soundtrack album composed by Hans Zimmer and Steve Mazzaro for the film of the same name and released by Back Lot Music on July 2, 2021.

== Development ==
In August 2020, it was announced that Hans Zimmer and Steve Mazzaro, who had composed for the first film would return for the sequel. Mazzaro said that most of the themes for Tim and Ted had been utiliized, but with a grander orchestration for Ted as he was aged, but Tim did not really grew up, resulting in not having a grown up version. However, as the characters turn into babies, they took the orchestrations back to the way did for the first film. They had also created newer themes for Tabitha and Tina, as well as co-writing an original song "The Global Warming Song" (which was not included in the album). The score was recorded at the AIR Studios in London. Due to travel restrictions, as a result of the COVID-19 pandemic, Mazzaro had to supervise the orchestra through Skype call.

The film features a rendition of Cat Stevens' "If You Want to Sing Out, Sing Out" by James Marsden and Ariana Greenblatt featuring Jacob Collier. Initially, the song was included in a temp track, but Zimmer who liked the song, eventually leveraged his personal acquitance with Stevens for licensing the song. An original song "Together We Stand" written by Gary Barlow was performed by Greenblatt, who recorded at her home remotely due to the pandemic. The soundtrack album was released through Back Lot Music on July 2, 2021, alongside the film.

== Reception ==
Christopher Garner of Movie Music UK wrote "The score can veer from zany fun to heartfelt tenderness to full-blown schmaltz, or switch from funk to jazz to flamenco on a dime, and the composers do it so well that it's easy to enjoy. Animated films typically give composers the chance to write music that's unrestrained by modern notions that film music should go unnoticed or serve only to create a mood. Zimmer and Mazzaro really capitalized on that opportunity here." Filmtracks wrote "Enthusiasts of Zimmer and Mazzaro's work for the 2017 entry will appreciate the greater depth in this sequel, but most listeners won't really notice a difference."

== Track listing ==
No.	Title	Artist(s)	Length
1.	"To Baby Corp"		2:02
2.	"Ted Comes Home"		2:27
3.	"Bedtime"		0:58
4.	"The Attic"		3:55
5.	"Crisis at Baby Corp"		1:54
6.	"The Secret Formula"		0:58
7.	"The Chase"		3:46
8.	"Acorn School"		3:58
9.	"Meet The Templetons"		3:33
10.	"Armstrong"		2:40
11.	"Nightmare Court"		2:16
12.	"We Overslept"		1:02
13.	"They're Home!"		1:51
14.	"Family Dinner"		3:44
15.	"Latchkey Kid"		0:52
16.	"Marcos Comes Home"		2:26
17.	"Baby Pep Rally"		2:13
18.	"School Days"		2:54
19.	"She Can Talk"		1:01
20.	"Stop the Show"		1:49
21.	"It's Back On"		3:18
22.	"Mission Planning"		2:21
23.	"Shutdown the Server"		5:23
24.	"Yay Templetons!"		4:05
25.	"The Greatest Gift"		2:36
26.	"If You Want to Sing Out, Sing Out"	James Marsden and Ariana Greenblatt feat. Jacob Collier	2:23
27.	"Together We Stand"	Ariana Greenblatt	3:15
Total length:			69:40

== Accolades ==
Award	Date of ceremony	Category	Recipient(s)	Result	Ref.
Hollywood Music in Media Awards	November 17, 2021	Best Original Song – Animated Film	"Together We Stand" – (Gary Barlow and Ariana Greenblatt)	Nominated	
