= No Time to Die (soundtrack) =

No Time to Die (Original Motion Picture Soundtrack)

Soundtrack album by Hans Zimmer
- Released: 1 October 2021
- Recorded: January 2020
- Studios: Abbey Road, London
- Genre: Film score
- Length: 71:00
- Label: Decca
- Producer: Steve Mazzaro

Hans Zimmer chronology
Dune (2021)	No Time to Die (Original Motion Picture Soundtrack) (2021)	Army of Thieves (2021)

Professional ratings
Review scores
Source	Rating
The Times	4/5 stars
Filmtracks	3/5 stars

No Time to Die (Original Motion Picture Soundtrack) is the soundtrack album to the 25th James Bond film of the same name. Released by Decca Records on 1 October 2021 (a week before the film's North American release), the music was composed by Hans Zimmer, making him the sixth non-British composer after Marvin Hamlisch, Bill Conti, Michael Kamen, Éric Serra and Thomas Newman to score a film in the series. The film's theme song of the same name performed by Billie Eilish, was composed with her brother Finneas O'Connell. The 12" vinyl album version features an additional four short music cues listed only as Q1, Q2, Q3 and Q4.

== Development ==
In July 2019, Dan Romer was announced as composer for the film No Time to Die's score, having previously worked with Cary Joji Fukunaga on Beasts of No Nation (2015) and Maniac (2018). Romer left the film due to creative differences in November 2019. Hans Zimmer replaced Romer by January 2020. It is the first time in the James Bond series history that a composer has been replaced during post-production, and the second major personnel change for the film after Danny Boyle left as director. Steve Mazzaro produced the score, while Johnny Marr played guitar. London Voices provided the choral element to the soundtrack. The No Time to Die score album was set to be released through Decca Records in March 2020 but was delayed to 1 October 2021 to coincide with the release of the film.

In January 2020, Billie Eilish was announced as the performer of the film's theme song, with her brother, Finneas O'Connell, serving as co-writer as well as the track's producer. The song, which has the same title, was released on 13 February 2020. At the age of 18, Eilish is the youngest artist to record a James Bond theme song. Despite the film's delay due to the COVID-19 pandemic, the song was nominated for and won the Grammy Award for Best Song Written for Visual Media at the 63rd Annual Grammy Awards, on 14 March 2021, six months before the film's release date, because the song itself was released during the 2019–20 eligibility period, in anticipation of the film's original April 2020 release date. At the 65th Annual Grammy Awards, Zimmer's score was nominated for Best Score Soundtrack for Visual Media.

The soundtrack contains references to two tracks from On Her Majesty's Secret Service soundtrack:

- "We Have All the Time in the World" (featured in "Matera"); it appears twice in the film instrumentally, the latter rendition of the theme not being included on album. The full version of the song performed by Louis Armstrong also plays during the ending credits, but also does not appear on the soundtrack.
- "Over and Out" (featured in "Good to Have You Back").

== Reception ==
Will Hodgkinson of The Times stated, "The key to a great James Bond theme tune is to capture a sense of nagging emotional loss in a way that's glamorous. Step forward, Billie Eilish, the world's most melancholic teenage pop star, who wraps her intimate, whispered vocals over words that, in proper Bond style, seem on the surface to be profound but in fact don't mean much at all." Saeed Saeed of The National wrote, "While the pulsating score by German composer Hans Zimmer fulfils the brief in heightening the film's spectacular action sequences, the creation of the music featured a few dramas of its own... The solitary vocal tune in the soundtrack is the titular track performed by Billie Eilish. While the dramatic power ballad, with her trademark whispery vocals and sweeping strings, was acclaimed and won a Grammy Award in March, the recording process wasn't so smooth."

Filmtracks dubbed the score "a massively mixed bag", complementing the score's thematic development and the "smartly addressed" returning motifs, but criticizing the action material (which is unfavorably compared to David Arnold's prior work on the franchise) as well as dubbing Eilish's title song "dismal [and] incoherent".

== Track listing ==
All tracks are performed by Hans Zimmer, except for "No Time to Die". Writing credits are from the ASCAP repertory.

No.	Title	Writer(s)	Length
1.	"Gun Barrel"	Monty Norman	0:56
2.	"Matera"	John Barry; Steve Mazzaro; Hans Zimmer	1:59
3.	"Message from an Old Friend"	Mazzaro; Norman; Zimmer	6:35
4.	"Square Escape"	Mazzaro; Norman; Zimmer	2:06
5.	"Someone Was Here"	Mazzaro; Norman; Zimmer	2:56
6.	"Not What I Expected"	Mazzaro; Zimmer	1:24
7.	"What Have You Done?"	Mazzaro; Norman; Zimmer	2:14
8.	"Shouldn't We Get to Know Each Other First?"	Mazzaro; Norman; Zimmer	1:21
9.	"Cuba Chase"	Mazzaro; Norman; Zimmer	5:40
10.	"Back to MI6"	Steven Doar; Norman; Zimmer	1:30
11.	"Good to Have You Back"	Barry	1:17
12.	"Lovely to See You Again"	Mazzaro; Billie Eilish O'Connell; Finneas O'Connell; Zimmer	1:25
13.	"Home"	Mazzaro; B. O'Connell; F. O'Connell; Zimmer	3:45
14.	"Norway Chase"	Mazzaro; Norman; Zimmer	5:06
15.	"Gearing Up"	Doar; Norman; Zimmer	2:53
16.	"Poison Garden"	Mazzaro; Zimmer	3:58
17.	"The Factory"	Mazzaro; Norman; Zimmer	6:42
18.	"I'll Be Right Back"	Mazzaro; Norman; B. O'Connell; F. O'Connell; Zimmer	4:59
19.	"Opening the Doors"	Mazzaro; Norman; Zimmer	2:44
20.	"Final Ascent"	Mazzaro; B. O'Connell; F. O'Connell; Zimmer	7:25
21.	"No Time to Die" (performed by Billie Eilish)	B. O'Connell; F. O'Connell	4:04
Total length:			71:00

== Charts ==
Chart performance for No Time to Die: Original Motion Picture Soundtrack
Chart (2021)	Peak position
Austrian Albums (Ö3 Austria)	9
Belgian Albums (Ultratop Flanders)	10
Belgian Albums (Ultratop Wallonia)	4
Czech Albums (ČNS IFPI)	58
Dutch Albums (Album Top 100)	25
French Albums (SNEP)	28
German Albums (Offizielle Top 100)	12
Hungarian Albums (MAHASZ)	40
Irish Albums (Official Charts)	41
Japan Hot Albums (Billboard Japan)	46
Japanese Albums (Oricon)	38
Norwegian Albums (VG-lista)	39
Polish Albums (ZPAV)	22
Portuguese Albums (AFP)	9
Scottish Albums (Official Charts)	6
Spanish Albums (PROMUSICAE)	30
Swiss Albums (Schweizer Hitparade)	3
UK Albums (Official Charts)	7

== See also ==
- James Bond music
- Outline of James Bond
