= Aquaman and the Lost Kingdom (soundtrack) =

2023 soundtrack album by Rupert Gregson-Williams

Aquaman and the Lost Kingdom (Original Motion Picture Soundtrack)

Soundtrack album by Rupert Gregson-Williams
- Released: December 22, 2023
- Recorded: 2023
- Genre: Soundtrack
- Length: 52:29
- Label: WaterTower
- Producer: Rupert Gregson-Williams

Rupert Gregson-Williams chronology
The Out-Laws (2023)	Aquaman and the Lost Kingdom (2023)	The Union (2024)

Singles from Aquaman and the Lost Kingdom
- 1. "Deep End" Released: November 17, 2023

Aquaman and the Lost Kingdom (Original Motion Picture Soundtrack) is the soundtrack album to the DC Extended Universe (DCEU) film of the same name, composed and arranged by Rupert Gregson-Williams. The soundtrack was released by WaterTower Music on December 22, 2023, to coincide with the film's release.

== Background ==
Rupert Gregson-Williams revealed in August 2021 that he was returning from Aquaman (2018) to compose the score for the sequel, Aquaman and the Lost Kingdom, after also doing so for the DC Extended Universe (DCEU) film Wonder Woman (2017). The song "Deep End" was performed by X Ambassadors and released as a single on November 17, 2023. The soundtrack album for Gregson-Williams' score was released by WaterTower Music on December 22.

== Track listing ==
All music is composed by Rupert Gregson-Williams.

Aquaman and the Lost Kingdom (Original Motion Picture Soundtrack)
No.	Title	Length
1.	"Deep End (featuring X Ambassadors)"	3:01
2.	"Aquaman and the Lost Kingdom"	1:59
3.	"Manta on the Bridge"	3:39
4.	"Call from the Deep"	1:50
5.	"The Real Superheroes"	1:11
6.	"Not Normal"	1:37
7.	"Necrus Rises"	3:01
8.	"Only Child"	2:57
9.	"Grasshoppers"	2:44
10.	"Mera Joins the Chase"	1:54
11.	"Orichalcum"	3:45
12.	"Black Manta Lair"	2:04
13.	"Swamp Walk"	1:31
14.	"Promise Me"	1:21
15.	"You Wanted Your Revenge"	1:35
16.	"My Eternal Night Is Ending"	3:31
17.	"Go and Feast"	2:29
18.	"Necrus Arrival"	3:16
19.	"Your Blood Will Do"	1:37
20.	"Cave In"	2:13
21.	"A True King"	2:52
22.	"The Next Chapter"	2:22
Total length:		52:29

== Additional music ==
This films includes songs that are not part of the official soundtrack: "Born to be Wild" by Steppenwolf, "China Girl" by Iggy Pop and "Spirit In The Sky" by Norman Greenbaum.
