= Music of Dune (2021 film) =

2021 soundtrack albums

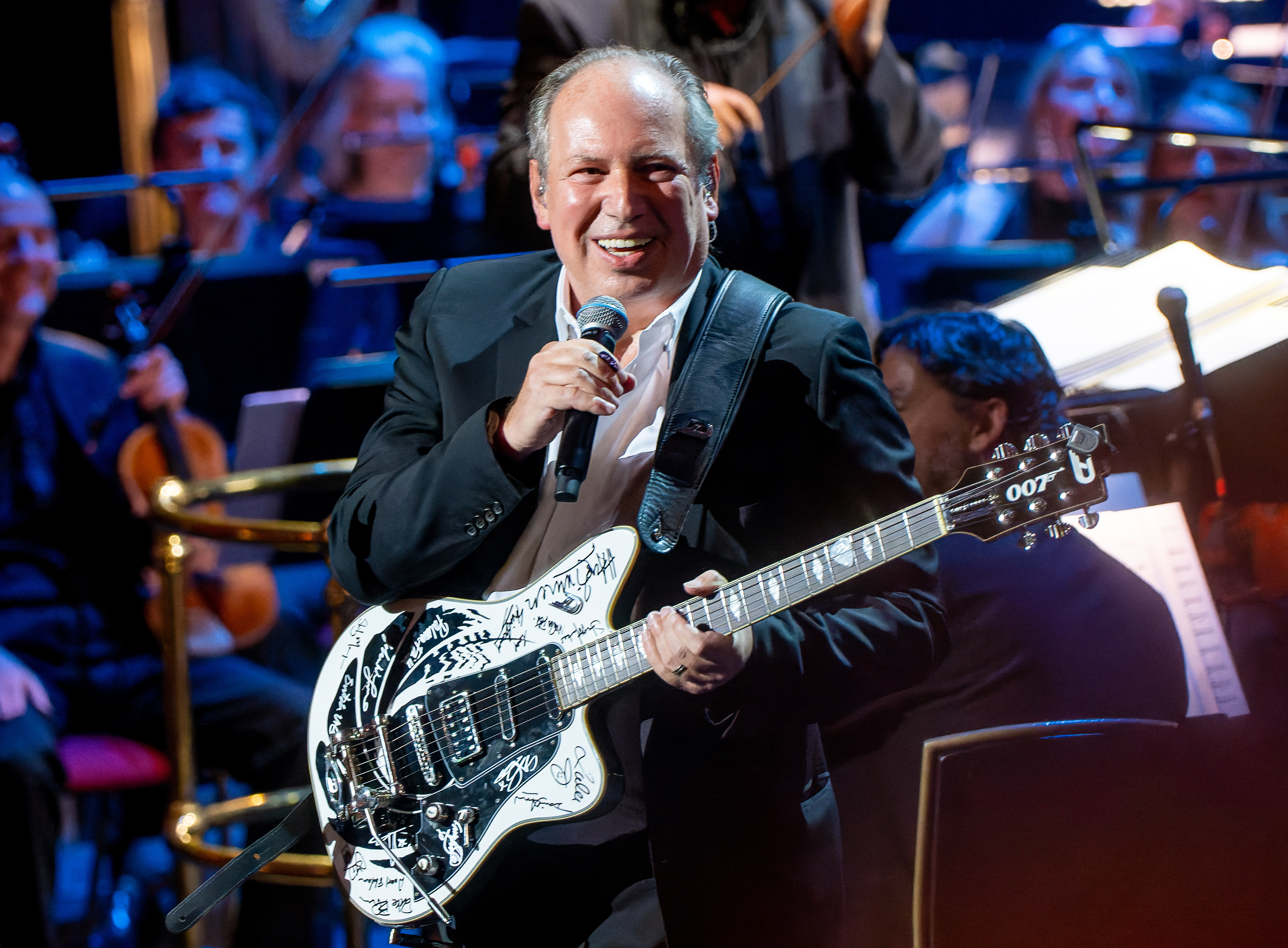
Hans Zimmer composed the music for Dune.

The music for the 2021 American film Dune was composed and arranged by Hans Zimmer. Zimmer wrote several soundtracks of music for the film, including for its sequel, and heavily utilized choir—specifically female voices—percussion, and strings in the score's instrumentation, as well as acoustic and wind instruments. New, hybrid instruments were fabricated to conceive the "otherworldly" tonal desert sounds heard in the film. The music has been described as the composer's most "unorthodox" and experimental yet. In addition, the score for the film earned Zimmer his second Academy Award for Best Original Score. When Dune: Part Two was announced for a 2023 theatrical release, it was revealed that Zimmer had begun work on the film's music and had over an hour of music to assist the filmmakers in planning the film.

== Overview ==
From the very beginning, film director Denis Villeneuve hoped to reunite with Zimmer for the project, based on their shared passion for the novel. Though initially approached by longtime collaborator Christopher Nolan to compose for Tenet, Zimmer ultimately chose to work on Dune, as the book was a "favorite" of his during his childhood and teen years. He last collaborated with Villeneuve, and editor Joe Walker, on Blade Runner 2049. In March 2019, Warner Bros. announced that the composer would be scoring the film. Dune also signalled the reunion of Hans Zimmer and sound designer/composer Theo Green who worked together on Blade Runner 2049. Zimmer worked very closely with Green on Dune with Green's composition "Tooth of Shai Hulud" providing the score for the "Shadout Mapes" crysknife scene, and Paul's first walk on Arrakis. It is one of the few key moments of the Dune soundtrack as yet unreleased.

Zimmer and Villeneuve both "agreed that the music would need to have a spirituality to it...a sanctified quality...that would elevate the soul and have the effect that only sacred music can". Zimmer approached the score's composition with a "fresh" perspective, "just from the book", having never seen the 1984 film adaptation by David Lynch. He built around the concept of Dune being a different civilization, and spent "months and months creating new instruments" to accompany that feeling, "defining, creating, and seeking new sounds, pushing the envelope". The composer augmented human voices "to sound eerie and other-worldly" for the score, and based it on mainly female voices due to the shared sentiment between himself and Villeneuve that the "power of the human voice" remains constant in any civilization, and that "the female characters in the film drive the story".

Three soundtrack albums for the film were released through WaterTower Music: The Dune Sketchbook (Music from the Soundtrack), Dune (Original Motion Picture Soundtrack), and The Art and Soul of Dune, on September 3, September 17, and October 22 respectively.

== "Eclipse" ==
Villeneuve chose British rock band Pink Floyd's "Eclipse", from their 1973 album The Dark Side of the Moon, as the "key musical element" in the first theatrical trailer released on September 9, 2020. Zimmer subsequently rearranged the track and recorded a cover version performed by a 32-piece ensemble of session singers from Los Angeles. Variety called the choice a "surprising" one, given that "trailers are not usually scored by the film's actual composer, much less a specially tailored cover of a classic rock song".

Following the onset of the COVID-19 pandemic, Zimmer told the publication in a June 2020 interview that "Working remotely is horrible, but I've done it. And if we have to do it like this, we'll do it like this." Recording sessions for the track were conducted in full compliance with COVID-19 protocols at the composer's Remote Control Productions studio in Santa Monica. Zimmer joined in remotely via FaceTime. Under the direction of Edie Lehmann Boddicker, the singers gathered four at a time, in "separate cubicles, divided by glass", over the course of eight sessions held earlier in the summer. Twelve performed the lyric lines, while the full group performed the choral parts. The entire song was recorded, but only thirteen lines were used in the three-minute long trailer. Boddicker commented that "[Zimmer] wanted to pay homage to the original, very back-phrased sound, a little spaced-out, so the vocals would not sound urgent. There's a kind of joy happening in the track, a lot of hopefulness. It's not despondent, just very peaceful and sounding not of this planet."

Zimmer's version—spanning a runtime of one minute and 36 seconds—was released as a digital single on October 9. It has not been included on any soundtrack album released so far and is not featured in the final film.

== Original soundtracks ==
=== The Dune Sketchbook ===
The Dune Sketchbook (Music from the Soundtrack)

Film score by Hans Zimmer
- Released: September 3, 2021
- Genre: Soundtrack
- Length: 101:45
- Label: WaterTower
- Producer: Hans Zimmer

Dune soundtrack chronology
The Dune Sketchbook (Music from the Soundtrack) (2021)	Dune (Original Motion Picture Soundtrack) (2021)

Singles from The Dune Sketchbook (Music from the Soundtrack)
- 1. "Paul's Dream" Released: July 22, 2021

The Dune Sketchbook (Music from the Soundtrack) is the first soundtrack album released for the film, on September 3, 2021, in physical and digital formats. It contains "extended, immersive musical explorations" of works from the film's score, and was released in Dolby Atmos and Standard sound, like its parent. The fifth track, "Paul's Dream", was one of two digital singles released on streaming platforms on July 22 prior to the album's drop. Zimmer announced their release via his Instagram account that same day. Originally heard in the film's theatrical trailer, the track, which features "a striking female voice singing", accompanies an "intense dream [sequence]" in the movie that Paul Atreides has "about his future and the future of Arrakis". According to The Nerdist, the track shares the "layers and intensity" of the scene and "culminat[es] in that beautiful roar from the singer". Classic FM described the seven-minute long piece as "begin[ning] with whisperings and soft vocals, before building to a spine-tingling, imposing climax".

A limited pressing of 3,000 copies of a special triple-vinyl edition of the sketchbook soundtrack, featuring artwork by Greg Ruth, was released on October 13. The colors of each vinyl—green, orange, and brown—are representative of the three key planets of Dune: Arrakis, Caladan, and Giedi Prime.

==== Track listing ====
Additional composition by Klaus Schulze on "Grains of Sand".

The Dune Sketchbook (Music from the Soundtrack)
No.	Title	Length
1.	"Song of the Sisters"	16:25
2.	"I See You in My Dreams"	18:25
3.	"House Atreides"	13:54
4.	"The Shortening of the Way"	11:14
5.	"Paul's Dream"	7:03
6.	"Moon Over Caladan"	8:34
7.	"Shai-hulud"	9:47
8.	"Mind Killer"	11:11
9.	"Grains of Sand"	5:12
Total length:		101:45

=== Dune (Original Motion Picture Soundtrack) ===
Dune (Original Motion Picture Soundtrack)

Film score by Hans Zimmer
- Released: September 17, 2021
- Genre: Soundtrack
- Length: 74:12
- Label: WaterTower
- Producer: Hans Zimmer

Hans Zimmer film score chronology
The Boss Baby: Family Business (Original Motion Picture Soundtrack) (2021)	Dune (Original Motion Picture Soundtrack) (2021)	No Time to Die: Original Motion Picture Soundtrack (2021)

Dune soundtrack chronology
The Dune Sketchbook (Music from the Soundtrack) (2021)	Dune (Original Motion Picture Soundtrack) (2021)	The Art and Soul of Dune (Companion Book Music) (2021)

Singles from Dune (Original Motion Picture Soundtrack)
- 1. "Ripples in the Sand" Released: July 22, 2021

Dune (Original Motion Picture Soundtrack) is the second soundtrack album for the film. Zimmer was inspired to look at the film's music "in a different way", "to take the audience on [a] journey beyond the movie", and felt it "must be available via an immersive technology that utilizes spatial audio" in order "to fully showcase" the "unique sounds" of the soundtrack. The album was his first to "wholeheartedly embrace" Dolby Atmos Music listening technology. According to the composer, the sound "wraps itself around you in a way that I haven't ever experienced before". The eighth track, "Ripples in the Sand", was the second of two digital singles—released to streaming platforms on July 22—that preceded the album's drop. ClassicFM described the track as having "a pacy, foreboding start" before reintroducing the "distinct vocals" heard previously on "Paul's Dream". The complete score was digitally released on September 17, 2021. Vocals were produced by Loire Cotler. The score was also nominated for Best Score Soundtrack for Visual Media at the 2022 Grammy Awards.

After a special IMAX previewing of the first ten minutes of Dune, Slashfilm's Vanessa Armstrong wrote that the score "brought home" the "alienness" of Arrakis as much as "the landscape and the costuming". Rafael Motamayor, in his film review for Inverse, commented that "Zimmer delivers yet another rousing score that mixes grandiose and operatic sounds with a surprising rock style, lending Dune a unique sonic palette to match its visuals". ClassicFM called the score an "otherworldly, Saharan-esque soundtrack, with stirring vocals and electrifying strings".

==== Track listing ====
Dune (Original Motion Picture Soundtrack)
No.	Title	Length
1.	"Dream of Arrakis"	3:08
2.	"Herald of the Change"	5:01
3.	"Bene Gesserit"	3:54
4.	"Gom Jabbar"	2:00
5.	"The One"	2:30
6.	"Leaving Caladan"	1:55
7.	"Arrakeen"	2:16
8.	"Ripples in the Sand"	5:14
9.	"Visions of Chani"	4:27
10.	"Night on Arrakis"	5:03
11.	"Armada"	5:09
12.	"Burning Palms"	4:04
13.	"Stranded"	0:58
14.	"Blood for Blood"	2:29
15.	"The Fall"	2:32
16.	"Holy War"	4:20
17.	"Sanctuary"	1:50
18.	"Premonition"	3:30
19.	"Ornithopter"	1:54
20.	"Sandstorm"	2:35
21.	"Stillsuits"	5:31
22.	"My Road Leads into the Desert"	3:52
Total length:		1:14:12

==== Charts ====
Chart performance for Dune
Chart (2021)	Peak position
Belgian Albums (Ultratop Flanders)	103
Belgian Albums (Ultratop Wallonia)	142
French Albums (SNEP)	187
Swiss Albums (Schweizer Hitparade)	45
UK Independent Albums (Official Charts)	24
UK Soundtrack Albums (Official Charts)	1

=== The Art and Soul of Dune ===
The Art and Soul of Dune (Companion Book Music)

Film score by Hans Zimmer
- Released: October 22, 2021
- Genre: Soundtrack
- Length: 103:29
- Label: WaterTower
- Producer: Hans Zimmer

Dune soundtrack chronology
Dune (Original Motion Picture Soundtrack) (2021)	The Art and Soul of Dune (Companion Book Music) (2021)

The Art and Soul of Dune is the third soundtrack album attached to the film. It contains "uniquely crafted versions of the film's main themes curated by Zimmer" to accompany a behind-the-scenes companion book written by executive producer Tanya Lapointe, titled Insight Editions' The Art and Soul of Dune. Zimmer was inspired to compose a second score after viewing the book's material—it was the first time he had ever written original music for a book. The album was made available for free streaming and digital download on October 22, 2021, in conjunction with the film's theatrical US release date.

==== Track listing ====
The Art and Soul of Dune
No.	Title	Length
1.	"Foreword"	4:30
2.	"This Is Only the Beginning"	14:25
3.	"Caladan"	7:20
4.	"Giedi Prime"	8:04
5.	"Salusa Secundus"	4:11
6.	"Arrakis"	13:27
7.	"The Attack"	9:30
8.	"Deep Desert"	15:13
9.	"Fremen"	26:49
Total length:		1:43:29

== See also ==
- Dune: Part Two (soundtrack)
- Dune (1984 soundtrack)
