= Jani Zhao =

Chinese-Portuguese actress

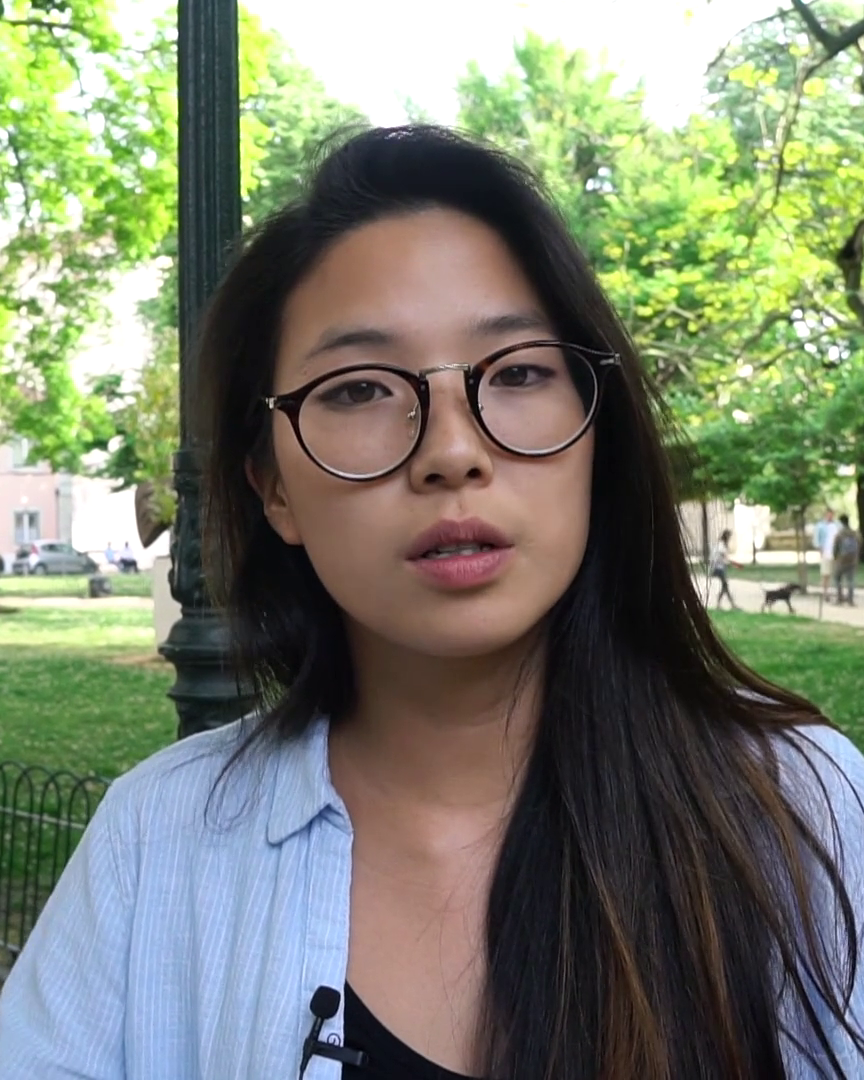
- Jani in 2016
- Born: Jani Cristina Dai Zhao; October 19, 1992 (age 33); Leiria, Portugal
- Citizenship: Portuguese; Chinese
- Occupation: Actress

Jani Cristina Dai Zhao (born October 19, 1992) is a Portuguese actress of Chinese descent. She is best known for playing Stingray in Aquaman and the Lost Kingdom

== Biography ==
Born in Portugal, she is the daughter of an American father of Chinese descent and a Macanese Chinese mother. She moved shortly afterwards to China, then to the United States and then back to Portugal when she was six years old. She began her modeling career at a young age in Portugal, turning to acting. She began her acting career in the children's soap opera Floribella in the role of the hippie Ashie in 2006. In 2008 she was part of the cast of Rebelde Way where she played the student Hoshi. Between 2009 and 2010 she participated in Sentimentos. Between 2010 and 2011 she was in Morangos com Açúcar where she played the role of Sandra and worked on the SIC K program, Pronto a Vestir. She resides in Lisbon.

In 2015, Jani Zhao participated in the Angolan telenovela Jikulumessu on Angolan Public Television (TPA 2), written by Coréon Dú.

In 2018, she participated in the TVI telenovela Jogo Duplo as one of the antagonists. She played the character Susana Wang, an assassin for a Macanese triad working under the orders of a Portuguese-Chinese criminal, Manuel Qiang. This role brought her recognition because, along with her colleague Anna Eremin, she performed homosexual romantic scenes, thus drawing attention to this theme and its importance.

In 2023, she played the fearless Stingray in the film Aquaman and the Lost Kingdom. In 2026, she starred as FP-25 member and theatre actress Rosa in the political thriller Projecto Global.
