= Ivo Ferreira =

Portuguese actor

- Born: September 1975 (age 50); Lisbon, Portugal
- Occupations: Director, screenwriter, actor
- Years active: 1997–present

Ivo Ferreira (born September 1975) is a Portuguese film director, screenwriter and actor. His 2016 film Letters from War was shown at the 66th Berlin International Film Festival.

== Selected filmography ==
- Letters from War (2016)
- Equinócio (2018)
- Empire Hotel (2018)
- Projecto Global (2026)
