= Arthur Curry (DC Extended Universe) =

DC Extended Universe character

Arthur Curry Aquaman
- DC Extended Universe character
- Promotional picture of Jason Momoa as Arthur Curry / Aquaman in Batman v Superman: Dawn of Justice (2016)
- First appearance: Batman v Superman: Dawn of Justice (2016)
- Last appearance: Aquaman and the Lost Kingdom (2023)
- Based on: Aquaman by: Mort Weisinger; Paul Norris
- Adapted by: Chris Terrio; Zack Snyder; James Wan; Will Beall; Geoff Johns
- Portrayed by: Jason Momoa; Kekoa Kekumano (16-year-old); Otis Dhanji (13-year-old); Kaan Guldur (9-year-old)
- Voiced by: Jason Momoa (The Lego Movie 2: The Second Part); Cooper Andrews (Aquaman: King of Atlantis)

In-universe information
- Aliases: The Aquaman; King Orin
- Species: Human-Atlantean hybrid
- Title: King of Atlantis
- Occupation: Lighthouse keeper Fisherman; Vigilante
- Affiliation: Justice League
- Family: Thomas Curry (father); Atlanna (mother); Orm Marius (half-brother); Atlan (ancestor)
- Spouse: Mera (wife)
- Children: Arthur Jr. (son)
- Origin: Maine, United States
- Nationality: American, Atlantean
- Abilities: Superhuman strength, speed, sight, hearing, and healing, swordcraft, hydrokinesis, marine telepathy, amphibious adaptation, gifted intelligence

Arthur Joseph Curry, also known by his superhero moniker Aquaman, is a fictional character in the DC Extended Universe based on the DC Comics superhero of the same name. He is portrayed by American actor Jason Momoa. Originally appearing as a cameo in Batman v Superman: Dawn of Justice, Curry had a prominent role in the film Justice League and its director's cut, and is later the subject of his own films Aquaman and Aquaman and the Lost Kingdom. Momoa also cameoed in the first season finale of the HBO Max series Peacemaker and the film The Flash. The DCEU marks Aquaman's first portrayal in cinema, with his character having been re-imagined as compared to his comics counterpart.

== Development and portrayal ==
=== Aquaman's portrayal in popular culture and early film attempts ===
First appearing in 1941 in DC Comics storylines, Aquaman was adapted to television with cartoons such as The Superman/Aquaman Hour of Adventure and Super Friends. He would also be adapted to films in the DC Animated Universe and was mentioned or briefly portrayed in live-action television such as Smallville, and a television pilot based on the character was produced by The CW with Justin Hartley playing Arthur "A.C." Curry/Aquaman. However, Aquaman has also been mentioned numerous times in the media as the butt of jokes due to his campy portrayal on certain media, with shows such as The Big Bang Theory, South Park, and Robot Chicken ridiculing or parodying his character.

Attempts to bring Aquaman to the big screen began in the 2000s. In 2004, FilmJerk.com reported that Sunrise Entertainment's Alan and Peter Riche planned to bring Aquaman to the big screen for Warner Bros., with Robert Ben Garant writing the screenplay. However, the attempt fell through. In 2007, Santiago Cabrera was cast as Aquaman in a Justice League film called Justice League: Mortal. That movie was also shelved later in the year. Years later, it was reported that an Aquaman film was in development at Leonardo DiCaprio's Appian Way Productions, though that film also was never created.

=== Casting ===
"It's nice not being the seventh Batman. It's nice to be the first one. And good luck being the next one."

— Jason Momoa on being the first actor to portray Aquaman in film.

Actor Jason Momoa was cast as Arthur Curry/Aquaman in the DC Extended Universe after the success of Man of Steel, with Geoff Johns telling Variety that Aquaman was a priority character for the studio once the DCEU was greenlit. Momoa says of his portrayal of the character, the first in cinema: "It's nice not being the seventh Batman. It's nice to be the first one. And good luck being the next one." Momoa also notes similarities between his character and himself, such as "feeling a connection to water" with his paternal Native Hawaiian ancestry, being raised by a single parent, and living in two drastically different locations in his youth, namely Hawaii and Iowa. He claims the role is "definitely the closest thing I’ve ever played to myself."

For the films, Momoa and other actors and stunt doubles had to learn to fight with a trident. They were also attached to harnesses during filming to simulate fighting under-water. Specifically for Aquaman, several special effects studios, such as Industrial Light & Magic (ILM), Method Studios, Scanline VFX, Digital Domain and others were employed to render Arthur's underwater and fighting scenes and hair movement in water, with the effects visible in scenes such as Orm and Arthur's first duel, Arthur and Mera's fight against Black Manta, and Arthur and Mera's visit to the Trench. A specially designed 700fps shot was used in the scene where the camera travels through Arthur's eyes.

In Aquaman, a younger Arthur Curry is portrayed by various actors, including an uncredited infant, Tainu and Tamor Kirkwood at age 3, Kaan Guldur at age 9, Otis Dhanji at age 13, and Kekoa Kekumano at age 16.

=== Characterization and themes ===
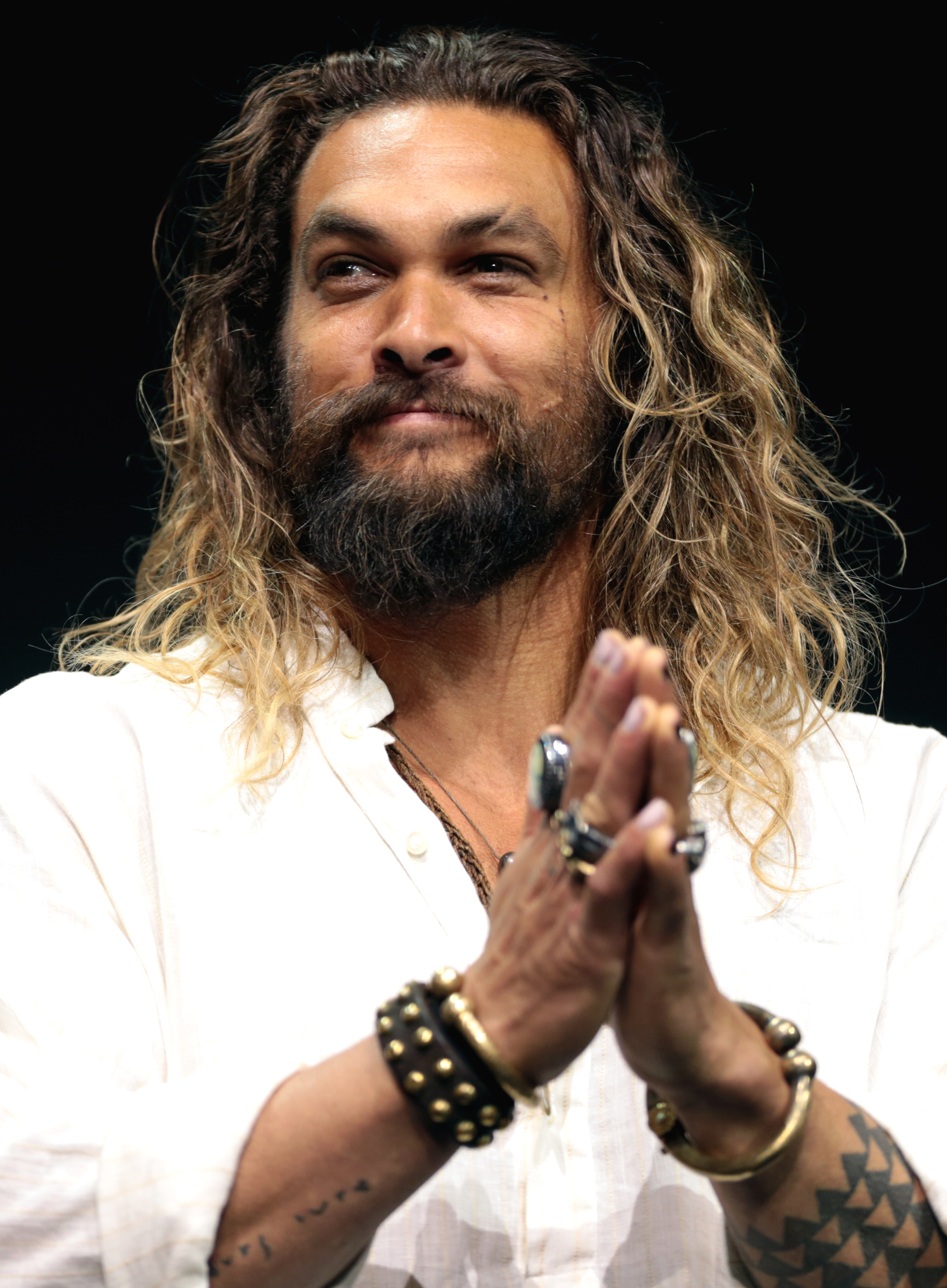
Critics have noted similarities between Jason Momoa and his character, which, as Momoa describes, "is the closest I've come to playing myself".

Unlike traditional comic book portrayals of Aquaman, the DCEU iteration of the character has a drastically different appearance, including being covered in tattoos and carrying a gruff demeanor. Miles Surrey of The Ringer describes Aquaman's portrayal in the films as a "natural extension of the larger-than-life man portraying him, Jason Momoa, who once auditioned for his role as Khal Drogo in Game of Thrones by doing the Haka." Clarisse Loughrey of The Independent notes that Aquaman, once the butt of many jokes due to his "garish orange and green attire, bleached blonde hair, and friendly relationship with the sea critters" in the comics and Super Friends, has been re-imagined as a muscled, trident-wielding hero. She says of Momoa: "The actor is the complete opposite of the Aquaman we know. This Aquaman is cool."

As portrayed in the films, Arthur Curry is described as arrogant but good-hearted and self-aware and has also been called an "outsider" and an "outlaw" by the films' creators. Like other superheroes in the DCEU such as Superman/Clark Kent and Batman/Bruce Wayne, Arthur faces self doubt, in part due to feeling alienated from both mankind and the Atlanteans for his half-Atlantean, half-human heritage, but does not suffer a tortured psyche like the other two. Arthur hides his insecurities and troubled past behind a tough and intimidating attitude, choosing to alienate himself from others and almost never showing sympathy towards anyone. He is notably reluctant to embrace his potential as a king and join in on heroics, initially declining requests for help from Bruce Wayne and Mera. However, he can be more relaxed and friendly around those he trusts and is close to, such as his father and Mera, and displays what Surrey calls a "bro-y charm". Despite his somewhat gloomy and fearsome exterior, Arthur is ultimately a selfless and compassionate person, indicated by him frequenting an Icelandic fishing village during the winter in order to feed its hungry inhabitants with fish and being careful not to inflict collateral damage on civilians during his battles. He also displays a dry sense of humor and is seen to be a thrill-seeker, and is also rather intelligent and fluent in several languages, similar to Wonder Woman/Diana Prince.

== Fictional character biography ==
=== Early life and training ===
Arthur Curry was born in 1986 to Thomas Curry, a lighthouse keeper of Māori descent living in Maine, and Atlanna, queen of Atlantis. Atlanna entrusts her son Arthur to her trusted advisor Nuidis Vulko for training, leaving him her trident, and voluntarily goes back to Atlantis, where she is sentenced to certain death by banishment to The Trench for Curry's illegitimate birth. While growing up, Curry is unable to control his abilities, such as communicating with sea creatures and breathing underwater, and later discovers them while fending off bullies. He is later trained by Vulko, though he rejects Atlantis upon learning of his mother's supposed execution. (Note: As established early on in Aquaman (2018))

=== Security footage ===
In 2015, through files Bruce Wayne takes from Lex Luthor, footage of Curry attacking an NSA drone that was following him in the Pacific Ocean is shown. Curry is one of several metahumans that Luthor had been researching in an attempt to blackmail them. Wayne sends this information to fellow metahuman Diana Prince.

=== Stopping Steppenwolf ===
==== Theatrical cut ====
In 2017, Wayne and Prince follow up on their plans to recruit the metahumans named in Luthor's files to form a team of superheroes in Superman's absence, especially after a global threat emerges when Steppenwolf arrives in an attempt to destroy all life on Earth. Wayne attempts to recruit Curry, whom he encounters in a remote Icelandic village. Despite Wayne revealing his secret identity as Batman, Curry angrily declines Bruce's offer until he notices Steppenwolf's Parademons invade Atlantis. He helps Princess Mera against the demon, though both are subdued as Steppenwolf takes a Mother Box under the Atlanteans' protection. Mera convinces Curry to go after Steppenwolf after mentioning his mother, who he believed had abandoned him.

Curry, who initially resents the Atlanteans, has a change of heart and comes to the aid of Wayne's team, which now includes Prince, Barry Allen, and Victor Stone, saving the team from a wall of water after they prevent Steppenwolf from taking a Mother Box guarded by humans under the bay between Metropolis and Gotham City.

Joining the team for good, Curry expresses skepticism as Batman decides to use the Mother Box to resurrect Superman. Though the team successfully revives him, Superman, having lost his memories, is provoked to briefly attack the group. In the skirmish, Steppenwolf takes the last Mother Box, as it was left unattended. As Superman leaves with Lois Lane to regain his memories, the five other heroes recuperate at the Batcave. As the team resolves to confront Steppenwolf once more without Superman, Curry gives an impassioned speech, expressing gratitude for meeting the other metahumans and being part of something bigger than himself in the event they die.

Curry takes a part in the battle, protecting Cyborg as he attempts to pull apart the Mother Boxes, though the team's plan is foiled by Steppenwolf. Superman arrives, however, allowing the team to defeat the demon, who, overcome with fear, retreats back to Apokolips when his own minions attack him.

==== Director's cut ====
Curry explains he wants to be "left alone" when Wayne invites him to join his team. Nuidis Vulko pleads for Curry's help in defending the Atlantean Mother Box when Arthur's half brother Orm Marius refuses to send help, giving Curry the armor and his mother's trident. Curry personally saves Mera by intercepting Steppenwolf's axe while attempting to guard the Mother Box. After rescuing the team under Gotham Harbor, Curry joins in the unanimous vote amongst the team members to resurrect Superman, though he later expresses doubt. He and Prince join Stone and Allen in digging up Clark Kent's body in Smallville, with Curry and Prince conversing about the historical rivalry between the Atlanteans and Amazons, which they both disagree with. Curry also expresses concern for Stone carrying out the final attack on the Mother Boxes mere hours after the death of his father, Silas.

After Stone and Superman separate the Mother Boxes in Russia, Aquaman impales Steppenwolf with his trident before Superman punches him into a boom tube and Wonder Woman decapitates him. Following the battle, Curry says goodbye to Vulko and Mera to see his father, Thomas.

=== King of Atlantis ===
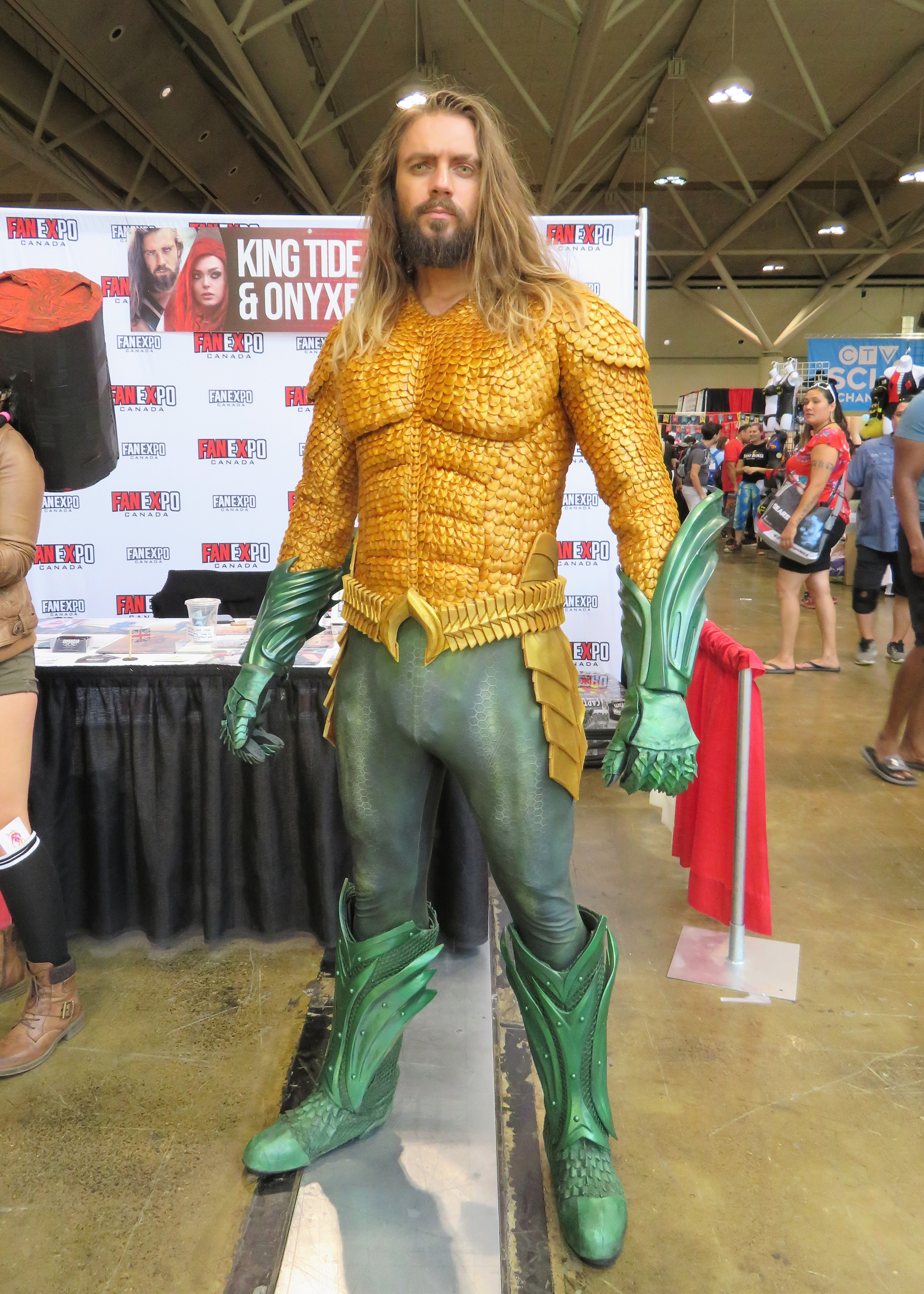
Cosplayer wearing Arthur Curry/Aquaman's royal armor as portrayed in Aquaman at the 2019 Fan Expo Canada.

One year after Steppenwolf's defeat, (Note: Jason Momoa and director James Wan clarified Aquaman takes place after Zack Snyder's Justice League rather than the theatrical release.) Curry begins to engage in more vigilantism, officially gaining the moniker Aquaman from the media much to his chagrin. He confronts pirates hijacking a Russian Akula-class submarine. Their leader, Jesse Kane, is killed in a failed attempt to kill Curry, and his son David vows revenge. Orm Marius, King of Atlantis and Curry's half-brother, convinces King Nereus of Xebel to help unite Atlantis and attack the surface world for polluting the oceans. Nereus notes that if Orm unites all four kingdoms, he will receive the title of Ocean Master, commander of the most powerful force on the planet.

Mera, who is betrothed to Orm, refuses to help them and tries to recruit Curry to stop the war. She gains his trust by saving Curry's father Thomas from a tsunami summoned by Orm. Curry reluctantly accompanies Mera to a rendezvous with Vulko, who urges Curry to find the Trident of Atlan, a magic artifact of Atlantis' first ruler, to reclaim his rightful place as king. They are ambushed by Orm's men, and Curry is captured. He is chained and presented to Orm, who blames him and the surface for Atlanna's death. Orm offers Curry an opportunity to leave forever, but Curry challenges him to a duel in a ring of underwater lava. Orm gains the upper hand and nearly kills Curry before Mera rescues him.

Curry and Mera journey to the fallen Kingdom of the Deserters hidden under the Sahara desert where the trident was forged and unlock a holographic message that leads them to Sicily, Italy. There they retrieve the trident's coordinates. The two are then attacked by David, who is now armed with Atlantean weapons and armor by Orm and calls himself Black Manta. Curry is caught off-guard and injured, but manages to defeat David and Mera destroys a tracking device from Orm disguised as a bracelet gifted to her. At their destination, Curry and Mera fend off amphibious monsters of the Trench and a wormhole transports them to an uncharted sea at the center of the Earth. They are reunited with Atlanna, who, 20 years earlier, survived her banishment to the Trench and escaped to the uncharted sea, alive and well.

Curry faces the Karathen, a mythical leviathan and keeper of the trident, and voices his determination to protect both Atlantis and the surface, proving his worth and reclaiming the trident, which grants him control over the seven seas. Curry and Mera, with the assistance of Karathen and the Trench, lead an army of marine creatures against Orm. Orm's followers embrace Curry as the true king upon learning he wields Atlan's trident. Curry defeats Orm in combat but spares his life, and Orm accepts his punishment after discovering that Curry has rescued their mother. Atlanna reunites with Thomas, while Curry ascends to the throne with Mera by his side.

=== Project Butterfly ===
Sometime later, Curry is summoned by Amanda Waller to assist the vigilante Christopher Smith / Peacemaker and a group of A.R.G.U.S. agents in their fight against an alien parasitic species, the Butterflies, alongside fellow Justice League members Diana Prince, Clark Kent, and Barry Allen. However, they arrive too late to help, as Smith and the agents had already killed nearly all of the Butterflies. There, Smith confronts the League about their untimeliness, and mocks Curry regarding rumors about him engaging in sexual intercourse with fish, much to his irritation.

=== Erased and Restored ===
After Barry Allen changes history by preventing his mother Nora's death, he finds himself in an alternate 2013 about to be invaded by General Zod's forces. He and his 2013 self attempt to assemble the Justice League and contact Thomas Curry to learn Arthur's whereabouts. However, in this timeline, Thomas never met Atlanna and so Arthur never existed. Later, when Barry restores the timeline, he meets a drunk Arthur and tells him about his adventures.

=== Life as King of Atlantis ===
Four years after becoming King of Atlantis, (Note: As established in Aquaman (2018)) and after his last meeting with the Flash, (Note: As depicted following the timeline reset in The Flash) Arthur has married Mera and had a baby son named Arthur Jr., who inherited his ability to communicate with marine life. He juggles his time raising his son in Thomas' home, being a superhero, and ruling Atlantis, but grows increasingly frustrated by the ruling council constantly vetoing his ideas. David Kane, still seeking revenge against him, acquires the Black Trident and becomes possessed by the ancient ruler Kordax. David's forces raid Atlantis for Orichalcum and burn it to drastically increase the Greenhouse effect, also unleashing a plague that kills several citizens including Vulko. Arthur suggests working with the surface world to reverse the environmental damage and cure the plague, but the council again vetoes him.

When Mera is hospitalized by a raid, Arthur decides to break Orm out of his prison in the desert and ask for his help. Orm agrees for the sake of the ocean and Atlantis. They interrogate an underwater mob boss called Kingfish and learn David hides in an island called the Devil's Deep. On the island, the brothers begin to bond while fending off monstrous plants and animals mutated by the orichalcum. They defeat several of David's men before David nearly overwhelms them. Reinforcements including a recovered Mera force David to flee. From Orm briefly touching the Black Trident, he learns of the history of the Lost Kingdom, Necrus, and how David needs a blood sacrifice from a descendant of Atlan to free Kordax from imprisonment. Realizing his son qualifies, everyone rushes to Thomas' home, but are too late to prevent David from injuring Thomas and abducting Arthur Jr.

David's repentant subordinate Stephen Shin releases a signal allowing them to track David's submarine to Necrus in Antarctica. While they fight off monsters in Necrus, Stephen delays David from sacrificing Arthur Jr. long enough for Arthur and Mera to arrive and defeat him. When Mera flees with her son, David hurls the Black Trident at her, but Orm catches it and is possessed by Kordax. The possessed Orm sheds Arthur's blood and revives Kordax. Arthur grabs the Black Trident and is nearly possessed, but resists and successfully urges Orm to resist. Arthur destroys the Black Trident with the Trident of Atlan, destroying Kordax as well. When Necrus begins collapsing, Arthur attempts to save David, but he spitefully allows himself to fall into a fissure.

Arthur and Mera thank Stephen and Orm for their parts in saving their son. Since Orm is still widely hated by the Fisherman Kingdom, they allow him to hide and lie that he died in the final battle. Later, Arthur reveals Atlantis' existence to the surface world and asks for membership into the United Nations, giving a heartfelt speech that only by working together can the world be safe.

== Alternate versions ==
=== Steppenwolf victorious ===
Zack Snyder's Justice League depicts a moment when the Mother Boxes converge, killing Curry and the Justice League. This version of events is erased when Barry Allen enters the speed force and reverses time.

=== Knightmare reality ===
In visions of the future that Stone and Wayne receive, Darkseid personally murdered Arthur at some point while enslaving the Earth and corrupting Superman into his minion, prompting Mera to join Batman's resistance force to seek revenge.

== Other appearances ==
=== The Lego Movie 2: The Second Part ===
Jason Momoa reprises his role as Aquaman in The Lego Movie 2: The Second Part. Despite the other DC Comics figurines maintaining their classic comics appearances in the film, Aquaman's figurine has taken on his DCEU appearance and characterization, with the "Classic Aquaman" figurine serving as a surfboard for Momoa's rendition of the character.

=== Shazam! ===
During the animated end credits sequence in the 2019 film Shazam!, Aquaman is seen having his picture taken with fans.

=== Aquaman: King of Atlantis ===
Though the HBO Max animated mini-series Aquaman: King of Atlantis is non-canon to the main DCEU, it references several events from the films and takes place shortly after Arthur becomes king in Aquaman. He is voiced by Cooper Andrews in the series.

=== Video games ===
The DC Extended Universe version of Aquaman was included in the 2018 video game Lego DC Super-Villains. Alongside appearing as a playable character, two levels were included based on the 2018 film. The character was also featured as an outfit in the online video game Fortnite. Two outfits were released, one being his King of Atlantis outfit and the other being his alter ego Arthur Curry.

== Reception ==
Aquaman's reinvention in the DCEU has received general praise throughout the character's appearances in the DCEU, resulting in renewed interest in the character. Miles Surrey described Jason Momoa's take on the character as "refreshing". In a three-star review of the character's eponymous film, Geoffrey Macnab writes that Momoa's "self-deprecating" performance helped balance the film's portentousness, and that the film was an overall improvement over previous installments in the film series such as Batman v Superman and Justice League. Matt Zoller Seitz of RobertEbert.com likewise notes that Aquaman, as portrayed in the film, is able to balance absurdness with serious matters. In addition, some analysts have noted similarities between Momoa's Aquaman and Chris Hemsworth's Thor in the Marvel Cinematic Universe.

== See also ==
- Characters of the DC Extended Universe
