= Projecto Global =

- Theatrical release poster
- Directed by: Ivo M. Ferreira
- Screenplay by: Ivo M. Ferreira; Hélder Beja
- Produced by: Luís Urbano; Sandro Aguilar; Donato Rotunno
- Starring: Jani Zhao; Rodrigo Tomás; José Pimentão
- Cinematography: Vasco Viana
- Edited by: Sandro Aguilar
- Music by: Nik Bohnenberger; Eva Aguilar
- Production companies: O Som e a Fúria; Tarantula
- Distributed by: NOS Audiovisuais
- Release dates: 1 February 2026 (IFFR); 23 April 2026 (Portugal)
- Countries: Portugal; Luxembourg
- Language: Portuguese

Projecto Global is a 2026 political thriller film directed by Ivo M. Ferreira. It stars Jani Zhao alongside Rodrigo Tomás and José Pimentão.

== Plot ==
Set in Lisbon against the backdrop of 1980s post-revolutionary Portugal, the plot follows the clandestine activities of Rosa and other members of FP-25, a far-left militant group.

== Cast ==
- Jani Zhao as Rosa
- Rodrigo Tomás as Jaime
- Isac Graça as Queiroz
- João Catarré as Balela
- Gonçalo Waddington as Amanuense
- Leo Zhao Ferreira
- José Pimentão as Marlow

== Production ==
The film is a Portuguese-Luxembourgish co-production by O Som e a Fúria and Tarantula. It had a budget north of €5 million.

== Release ==
Selected in the 'Big Screen Competition' of the 55th International Film Festival Rotterdam (IFFR), the film landed its world premiere on 1 February 2026. Distributed by NOS Audiovisuais, It was released theatrically in Portugal on 23 April 2026.

== Reception ==
Olivia Popp of Cineuropa assessed that "although the film is arguably too long, Projecto Global grows more compelling as it goes on".

Lee Marshall of ScreenDaily considered the "tasty, sexy headlong gallop" to be as "self-aware as One Battle After Another in the way it draws cinematic energy from the blend of romance, jeopardy, frustration, treachery and buffoonery that is inherent in the life of a clandestine operative".

== See also ==
- List of Portuguese films
