= Aquaman (film) =

2018 superhero film by James Wan

- Theatrical release poster
- Directed by: James Wan
- Screenplay by: David Leslie Johnson-McGoldrick; Will Beall
- Story by: Geoff Johns; James Wan; Will Beall
- Based on: Characters from DC
- Produced by: Peter Safran; Rob Cowan
- Starring: Jason Momoa; Amber Heard; Willem Dafoe; Patrick Wilson; Dolph Lundgren; Yahya Abdul-Mateen II; Nicole Kidman
- Cinematography: Don Burgess
- Edited by: Kirk Morri
- Music by: Rupert Gregson-Williams
- Production companies: Warner Bros. Pictures; DC Films; The Safran Company
- Distributed by: Warner Bros. Pictures
- Release dates: November 26, 2018 (Empire, Leicester Square); December 21, 2018 (United States)
- Running time: 143 minutes
- Country: United States
- Language: English
- Budget: $160–200 million
- Box office: $1.152 billion

Aquaman is a 2018 American superhero film based on the DC Comics character Arthur Curry / Aquaman. Produced by DC Films, Warner Bros. Pictures, and The Safran Company, it is the sixth film in the DC Extended Universe (DCEU). The film was directed by James Wan and written by David Leslie Johnson-McGoldrick and Will Beall. Jason Momoa stars as Aquaman, who sets out to lead the underwater kingdom of Atlantis and stop his evil half-brother, King Orm (Patrick Wilson) from uniting the seven underwater kingdoms to destroy the surface world. Amber Heard, Willem Dafoe, Dolph Lundgren, Yahya Abdul-Mateen II, and Nicole Kidman also star in supporting roles.

Development began in 2004 but did not gain traction until Man of Steel was released in 2013. In August 2014, Beall and Kurt Johnstad were hired to write competing scripts. Wan signed on as director in April 2015, and in July 2016, the film moved forward with Beall's screenplay. The main cast was confirmed through 2016 and early 2017. Principal photography began in Australia in May 2017, taking place at Village Roadshow Studios on the Gold Coast, Queensland, Australia, with additional production teams in Canada, Italy, and Morocco. Filming concluded the following October. Several vendors provided visual effects and animation, ranging from high-detail hair simulations to the creation of CGI animals and locations.

Aquaman premiered in London on November 26, 2018, and was released in the United States on December 21. The film received mixed to positive reviews from critics and grossed $1.152 billion worldwide, making it the highest-grossing DCEU film, the highest-grossing film based on a DC Comics character, the fifth-highest-grossing film of 2018, and (at the time of its release) the 20th highest-grossing film of all time. A sequel, Aquaman and the Lost Kingdom, was released on December 22, 2023, while a non-canonical animated miniseries, Aquaman: King of Atlantis, is set after the events of this film and was released in October 2021.

== Plot ==
In 1985 Maine, lighthouse keeper Thomas Curry rescues Atlanna, queen of the underwater kingdom of Atlantis, during a storm. They fall in love and have a son named Arthur, who has the power to communicate with sea creatures. When Atlantean soldiers sent by King Orvax (the ruler of Atlantis) arrive for Atlanna, who fled her arranged marriage, she is forced to leave her family to protect them from her people. She promises to return when it's safe and goes back to Atlantis, entrusting her advisor, Nuidis Vulko, to train Arthur. Becoming a skilled warrior, Arthur rejects Atlantis upon learning that Orvax executed Atlanna for loving a human and birthing an illegitimate son.

In the present, Arthur has become known as the metahuman dubbed as "Aquaman" by the public. One year after Steppenwolf's defeat, (Note: As depicted in Justice League (2017) and its 2021 director's cut.) Arthur confronts a gang of pirates hijacking the Russian Akula-class submarine K-461 "Volk" (named "Stalnoivolk" in the film). Their leader, Jesse Kane, is killed while trapped by a torpedo, leading his son David to vow revenge against Arthur after he refused to help save Jesse in retaliation for murdering innocent people.

Meanwhile, King Orm Marius, Orvax's son and Arthur's younger half-brother who is now the new ruler of Atlantis after his father passed away, persuades King Nereus of Xebel to join forces in uniting Atlantis and destroying the surface world for polluting the oceans. If Orm successfully unites all four kingdoms, he will become Ocean Master, commander of Earth's most powerful underwater force. They are ambushed by the Stalnoivolk submarine, now repaired and operated by David Kane, prompting Orm to feel compelled to unleash a tsunami. However, Orm is revealed to have orchestrated the attack after hiring David and Jesse to hijack the submarine and gain Nereus's support, with plans to kill Arthur. To that end, Orm provides David with an Atlantean battle suit for the mission.

Nereus' daughter Mera, betrothed to Orm, refuses to aid them and requests Arthur's help. Arthur accompanies her to Atlantis after Orm's tsunami nearly kills his father. Vulko urges him to find the Trident of Atlan, a powerful artifact of Atlantis' first ruler, to reclaim his rightful place as king. Mera and Arthur are ambushed by Orm's men, and he is captured. Orm blames him for Atlanna's death and nearly kills him in a duel before Mera rescues him. She and Arthur journey to the fallen Kingdom of the Deserters, hidden under the Sahara, where the Trident was forged, and unlock a holographic message that leads them to Sicily, where they retrieve the trident's coordinates. Meanwhile, Orm imprisons Vulko and coerces the Kingdom of the Fishermen to pledge their allegiance to him by killing their king.

Rechristening himself as "Black Manta", David battles Arthur, but is defeated. Traveling out to sea on a stolen boat, Arthur and Mera fend off amphibious monsters of the Trench, and a wormhole transports them to an uncharted sea at the center of the Earth. They are reunited with Atlanna, who survived and escaped into the uncharted sea but could not find her way back. Arthur faces the Karathen, a mythical sea monster and guardian of the Trident; after proving his worth, it allows him to claim the Trident, which grants him control over the seven seas. Orm leads his army against the Kingdom of the Brine to declare himself Ocean Master, while in turn, Arthur leads an army of marine creatures, including Karathen and the Trench, against him. Orm's followers embrace Arthur as the true king upon learning that he wields Atlan's trident. Arthur spares Orm's life after beating him in a duel, and Orm accepts his imprisonment after discovering that Arthur rescued their mother. Atlanna reunites with Thomas, while Arthur ascends to the throne.

In a mid-credits scene, Manta is saved by Dr. Stephen Shin, a marine scientist and conspiracy theorist obsessed with Atlantis, and agrees to lead Shin there in exchange for help in his revenge on Arthur.

== Cast ==
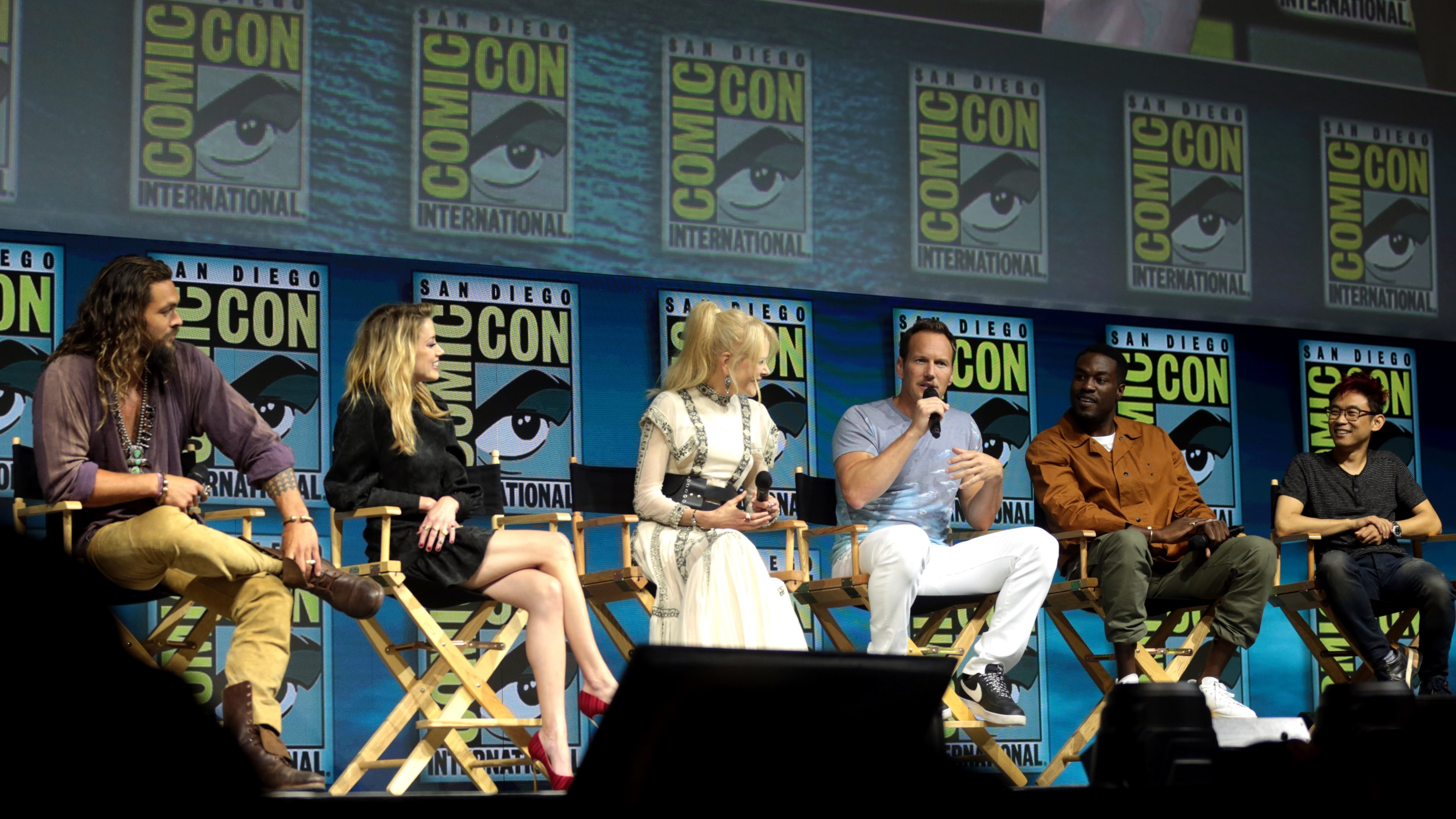
Cast and director of Aquaman at the 2018 San Diego Comic-Con. From left to right: Jason Momoa, Amber Heard, Nicole Kidman, Patrick Wilson, Yahya Abdul-Mateen II, and James Wan

- Jason Momoa as Arthur Curry / Aquaman:
  A half-Atlantean, half-human who is reluctant to be king of the underwater kingdom of Atlantis. He is a member of the Justice League. He possesses superhuman strength and durability, has hydrokinetic powers, can communicate with sea creatures, and can swim at supersonic speeds. A younger Arthur Curry is portrayed by various actors, including Kobi Booker as the infant, Tainu and Tamor Kirkwood at age 3, Kaan Guldur at age 9, Otis Dhanji at age 13 and Kekoa Kekumano at age 16.
- Amber Heard as Mera:
  The princess of Xebel, Arthur's love interest, a warrior and daughter of King Nereus. She was raised by Queen Atlanna and groomed to become queen. Mera possesses hydrokinetic and telepathic powers that allow her to control her aquatic environment and communicate with other Atlanteans.
- Willem Dafoe as Nuidis Vulko:
  Atlantis' vizier, who mentored the young Arthur and trains him to fight. Dafoe was digitally de-aged for the flashback scenes.
- Patrick Wilson as Orm Marius / Ocean Master:
  Arthur's younger Atlantean half-brother and king of Atlantis, who seeks to unite the seven underwater kingdoms and become the Ocean Master to declare war on the surface world for humanity's desecration of the seas. Wilson previously voiced the President of the United States of America in the DC Extended Universe film Batman v Superman: Dawn of Justice (2016).
- Dolph Lundgren as Nereus:
  Mera's father and the king of the Atlantean tribe of Xebel, whom Orm tricks into an alliance through false pretenses.
- Yahya Abdul-Mateen II as David Kane / Black Manta: (Note: Although identified onscreen as "Black Manta" in the film itself, Abdul-Mateen II is credited as simply "David Kane / Manta".)
  A ruthless pirate and a high-seas mercenary with a flair for creating deadly technological innovations. He is not referred to by his civilian name in the film and is credited simply as "Manta".
- Ludi Lin as Captain Murk: The commander of the Men-of-War, the frontline army of Atlantis.
- Temuera Morrison as Tom Curry: Arthur's father and a lighthouse keeper.
- Nicole Kidman as Atlanna: The Queen of Atlantis, mother of Arthur and Orm. Kidman previously played the role of Dr. Chase Meridian in Batman Forever.
- Ilya Melnikoff as Russian submarine captain
- Kyryl Koltsov as Russian submarine crew member

Randall Park portrays Doctor Stephen Shin, a marine biologist obsessed with finding the lost city of Atlantis. Graham McTavish appears as King Atlan, the first king of Atlantis and the ancestor of Atlanna, Arthur, and Orm. Michael Beach plays Jesse, Manta's father and the leader of their group of ocean pirates.

Leigh Whannell, director Wan's longtime film collaborator, appears in the film as a cargo pilot. Julie Andrews provides the voice of Karathen, a mythical sea monster and keeper of the Trident of Atlan who allies with Aquaman. John Rhys-Davies voices the Brine King and Djimon Hounsou voices King Ricou of the Fishermen, while both of these characters are portrayed on screen through motion capture performed by Andrew Crawford. Natalia Safran and Sophia Forrest provide the voice and motion capture of Fishermen Queen Rina and Fishermen Princess Scales, respectively.

== Production ==
=== Development ===
In 2004, FilmJerk.com reported that Sunrise Entertainment's Alan and Peter Riche planned to bring Aquaman to the big screen for Warner Bros., with Robert Ben Garant writing the screenplay. However, the attempt fell through. In 2007, Warner Bros. announced the development of a Justice League film with Michele and Kieran Mulroney writing the screenplay. The film, reportedly titled Justice League: Mortal, would have been Aquaman's cinematic debut. George Miller signed on to direct later that year. However, the film would be canceled following production delays stemming from the 2007–08 Writers Guild of America strike. Prior to the film's cancellation in 2008, actor Santiago Cabrera had been cast as Aquaman. In July 2009, it was reported that Aquaman was in development at Leonardo DiCaprio's Appian Way Productions. Warner chairman and CEO Barry Meyer said that an Aquaman film was in development. After Man of Steel's release in 2013, a source from Warner Bros. told The Wrap that they were discussing future films, with the mention of more Man of Steel movies as well as a Superman/Batman film, a Wonder Woman film and an Aquaman film. Geoff Johns told Variety that Aquaman was a priority character. On August 12, 2014, Warner Bros. announced that it had hired screenwriters Will Beall and Kurt Johnstad to pen separate scripts. The film was developed on dual tracks, although only the better version would move forward. Peter Jackson was twice approached to direct the film but he declined both times.

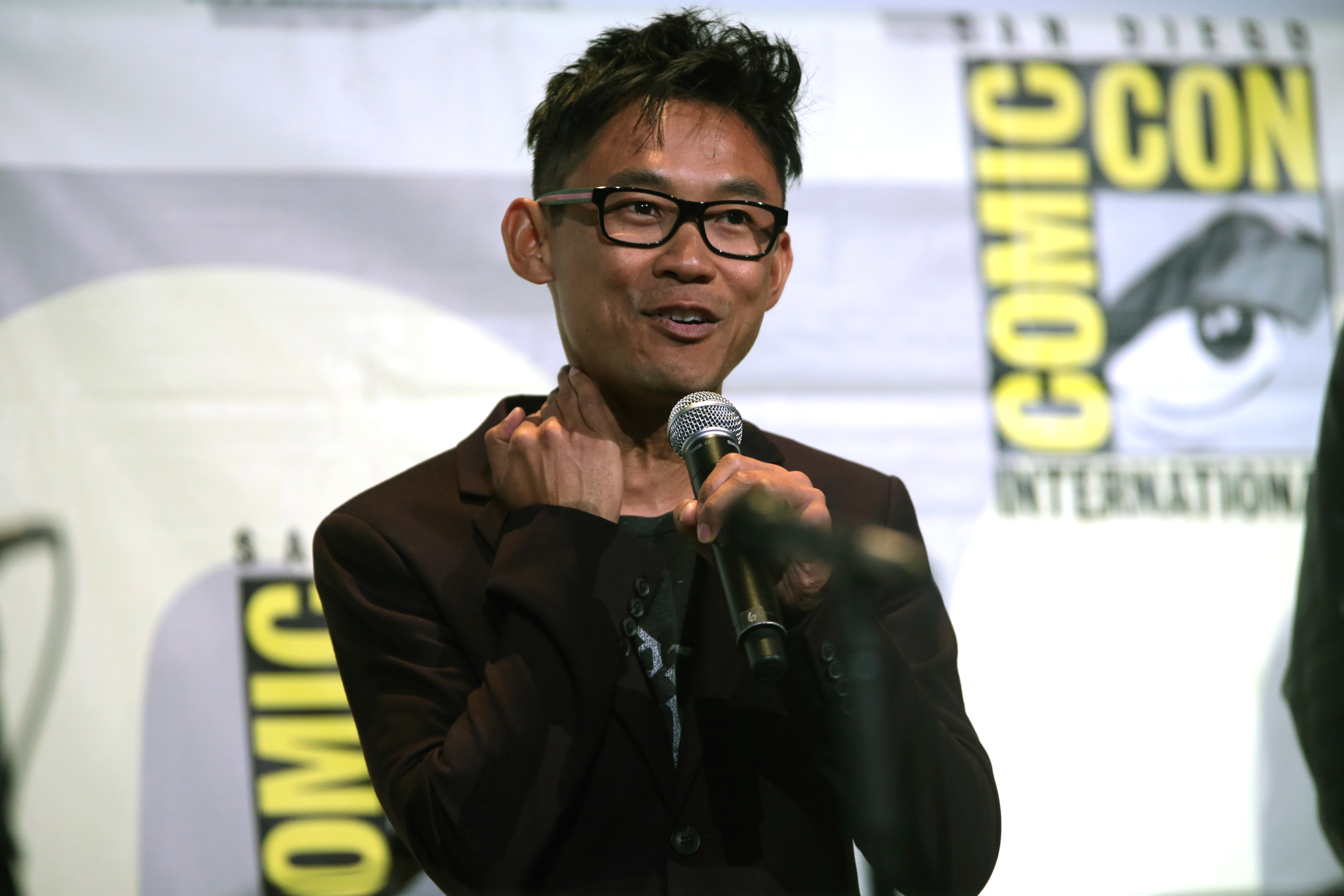
James Wan at the 2016 San Diego Comic-Con

In April 2015, The Hollywood Reporter reported that James Wan was the front-runner to direct. In June, Wan was confirmed to direct and overlook the screenplay by Johnstad. Wan was given the choice to direct The Flash or Aquaman, he chose the latter as he felt that Flash had already been done. In November, David Leslie Johnson-McGoldrick was hired to write the script; however, it was unclear whether his would be separate or work with Wan. Previous script plans had been scrapped and Wan and Johns planned to move forward with a new script written by Beall. Later, Johnson-McGoldrick was brought back to the project to rewrite Beall's script.

In March 2016, it was announced that the events of Aquaman would be set after Justice League (2017). Wan confirmed that cinematographer Don Burgess, who had previously collaborated with Wan on The Conjuring 2 (2016), would serve as cinematographer. Pre-production began in Australia in late November 2016.

=== Casting ===
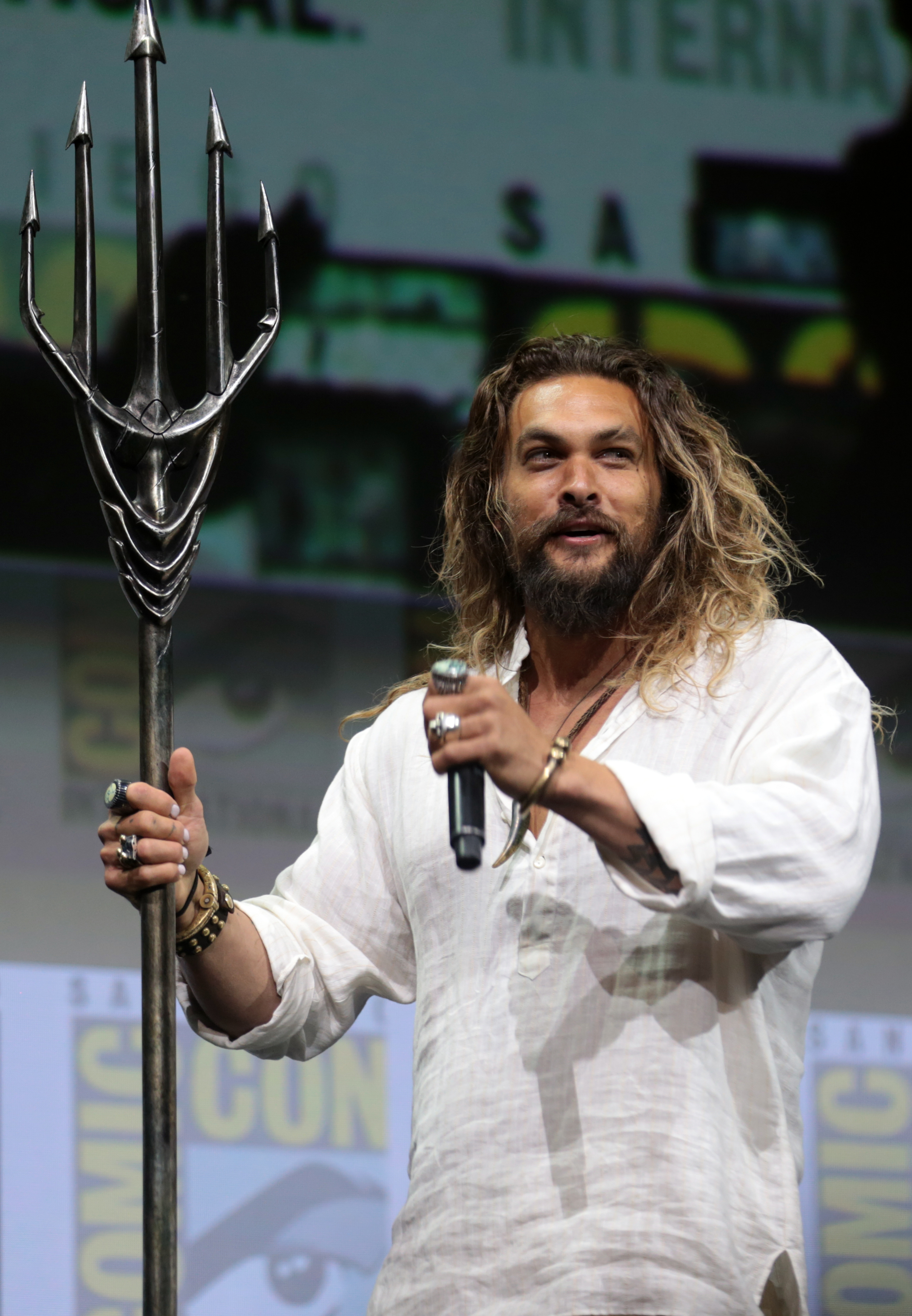
Jason Momoa at the 2017 San Diego Comic-Con

In October 2014, Warner Bros. announced Aquaman as a part of the DC Extended Universe (DCEU), with Jason Momoa starring. On October 20, 2014, Momoa revealed that he was preparing for Justice League and that he did not know whether a solo Aquaman film would come before or after. He thought it might be an origin story. In December 2014, it was revealed that Momoa had signed a four-picture deal with the studio and DC, and he wanted Zack Snyder to direct the film.

On January 13, 2016, The Hollywood Reporter announced that Amber Heard had entered negotiations to play Mera; her casting was confirmed two months later. In April 2016, Willem Dafoe was cast in an undisclosed role, later revealed to be Nuidis Vulko. On December 12, 2016, it was confirmed that Patrick Wilson would play Aquaman's half-brother. On January 31, 2017, Yahya Abdul-Mateen II was added to the cast as Black Manta, Aquaman's archenemy in the comics. Michael K. Williams was also considered for the role. That same day, press reports noted that Nicole Kidman had entered talks to play Queen Atlanna. Two months later, Kidman confirmed her participation.

By February 2017, New Zealand actor Temuera Morrison had entered talks to play Thomas Curry. On April 12, Dolph Lundgren was cast as Nereus. Ludi Lin was cast in the film on May 15, 2017. Almost two weeks later, Michael Beach, who voiced Devil Ray, a character loosely based on Black Manta in the series Justice League Unlimited, was cast as Black Manta's father. In October 2017, Graham McTavish revealed that he had a role. In April 2018, Randall Park was cast as Dr. Stephen Shin, and in July, Djimon Hounsou, Natalia Safran and Sophia Forrest were cast as the Fisherman King, Fisherman Queen, and Fisherman Princess, respectively. In November 2018, it was revealed that Julie Andrews had a voice role.

=== Filming ===
Principal photography began in Australia on May 2, 2017, under the working title Ahab. A majority of the film was shot at Village Roadshow Studios in Gold Coast, Queensland, with additional production in Newfoundland, Sicily and Morocco. Between May and August 2017, location shooting took place on the Australian Gold Coast, including Main Beach, Coomera, Southport and Amity Point in North Stradbroke Island, Queensland, as well as Hastings Point, in New South Wales. On filming underwater sequences, Wan stated that "the underwater world is super complicated" and "it's not an easy shoot".

Filming began on the Lighthouse set at Hastings Point in August 2017, and ended later that month. Filming took place in Newfoundland and Labrador. Dafoe finished up his part by late September. In October, Wan announced that Wilson had wrapped. Filming on location took place in Morocco by mid-October, which included the cities of Merzouga and Erfoud. Principal photography wrapped in October.

=== Post-production ===
James Wan's five-time collaborator Kirk Morri served as the editor for Aquaman. Two-time Academy Award winner Charles Gibson and Kelvin McIlwain served as visual effects supervisors. On November 3, 2018, Wan announced that post-production was complete.

Some additional detail of blood was removed from the UK version of the film to achieve a lower age rating.

=== Visual effects ===
Two thousand three hundred visual effects shots (VFX) appear in the movie, completed by Industrial Light & Magic (ILM), Base FX, Rodeo FX, Scanline VFX, DNEG, Luma Pictures, Weta Digital, Moving Picture Company (MPC), Method Studios, Digital Domain and Clear Angle Studios. The visual effects for the director's cut were created at the same time as the theatrical cut.

ILM was the main VFX company and worked on creating Atlantis and all its CGI animals, the Karathen, and the final battle. Jeff White served as the VFX supervisor for ILM. For the underwater sequences, the actors were shot dry-for-wet on special tuning fork rigs designed by the VFX team, and later the bodies of the actors were replaced with digital doubles in post-production. For creating Atlantis, the team relied on the designs provided by the art department. ILM's environment team created over 200 buildings, including the signature jellyfish buildings, and laid over 7,000 buildings in districts covering almost 600 square miles for the action to travel through. The underwater ships were modeled after organic creatures and designed to move that way. For the entrance to the Atlantis sequence, the team built over 150,000 ships to fill the traffic lanes leading into Atlantis. All the animals, including the Karathen, were built by ILM and animated using keyframe animation.

Approximately 700 shots in the film required high-detail hair simulations. ILM had to significantly improve its hair simulation software due to the unique aspects of hair flowing underwater. Normally, hair simulations use guide strands to define or influence the movement of groups of hair strands. This did not provide a satisfying look, so ultimately, ILM simulated strands individually, which required heavy computations. Additionally, Wan wanted to be able to direct the hair when the physically accurate simulation resulted in undesirable results. ILM delivered 670 shots.

Weta Digital handled most of the digital de-aging involved in the film. They digitally de-aged Kidman and Morrison for flashback sequences. DNEG digitally de-aged Dafoe for the scene where his character Nuidis Vulko trains the young Arthur.

Jay Barton served as the VFX supervisor for Digital Domain. They worked on creating the Dead King's Island environment. For the sequence, the actors were shot in a pool of water against blue screen backgrounds with Digital Domain adding CGI extensions, waterfalls, mountains, and dinosaurs in post-production. Most of the waterfalls in the scene were created using Houdini, while some were created using practical elements of things such as pouring salt and glass beads. They also built an extensive library of shot VFX elements. The dinosaurs were animated using keyframe animation. Digital Domain delivered 19–20 shots.

David Nelson and Craig Wentworth served as VFX supervisors for Method Studios. Method handled the Sicily fight sequence between Arthur, Mera, and Black Manta; Arthur's encounter with the Karathen in the Well of the Souls; and his acquisition of Atlan's trident. For the Sicily fight sequence, the team built the main square of the Italian village and terracotta-tiled roof set pieces that were backed with a blue screen. A completely CGI village was also created based on scans and documentation of the real village. For the Well of the Souls sequence, Momoa was filmed dry-for-wet and captured on set in rigs that simulated underwater movements, but they ultimately felt restrictive, so artists replaced the majority of his performance with a digital body double and added the CGI environment, Karathen and Arthur's free-flowing locks. A specially designed 700fps shot was used in the scene where the camera travels through Arthur's eyes.

Rodeo FX worked on two key sequences, with Sebastien Moreau as VFX Supervisor. For the aquarium that young Arthur visits near the beginning, Rodeo FX used simulations as well as algorithms for the fish behavior. They created hard and soft corals by developing a colonization growth system, along with procedural stem and tentacle generation tools. They also created the environments for the Atlantis ruins below the desert. Artists used a Lego-type approach to layer the environment with a large amount of sand, dust, and rocks, all of which would realistically give way to the characters' interactions. From there, they sculpted ruined buildings, bridges, towers, statues, and temples, which were textured and shaded to add depth to the ruined city.

Scanline VFX delivered 450 shots. Bryan Hirota served as VFX supervisor. The main sequences produced by them were the lighthouse and its surrounding environment; the "Aquaman" title card that follows the Boston aquarium; Aquaman pushing the submarine to the surface and rescuing the sailors inside; Orm's tidal wave that sweeps away Arthur and Tom, including the rescue and aftermath; Black Manta being paid by Orm for the submarine's delivery; and Arthur and Mera's visit to the Kingdom of the Trench. For the title card, the team relied on Rodeo's work on the aquarium sequence and simulated up to 60,000 fish. The tidal wave sequence was realized with a large-scale simulated wave, which was integrated with a combination of day-for-night footage, blue screenshots for the actors in truck interiors, a truck on a rotisserie rig, an interior cabin in a water tank, and VFX simulations for debris. For creating the lighthouse, a full-size house with the base of the lighthouse tower was constructed by the VFX team. Additional house and dock sets were built on sound stages. A digital build-out was done to complete the lighthouse tower and extend the dock fully out into the sea. For the sequence where the camera pushes into a toy snow globe with a tiny lighthouse inside, a CGI transition was created from the lighthouse's living room set to a fully CGI winter coastline. For creating the Trench creatures, motion capture was done on set by stunt performers.

=== Music ===
On March 7, 2018, Rupert Gregson-Williams was announced as the composer for Aquaman. Gregson-Williams previously composed the score for Wonder Woman, the fourth film in the DCEU. The soundtrack was released by WaterTower Music on December 14, 2018. The album features two original songs, the first by American musician Skylar Grey titled "Everything I Need", written by Grey and Elliott Taylor and the second by American rapper Pitbull featuring Rhea titled "Ocean to Ocean", written by Pitbull, George Bechara, Bianca Oechsle and Gabriel Dunn, this song samples Toto's "Africa" (1982), written by Jeff Porcaro and David Paich also being credited as songwriters. Joseph Bishara, Wan's frequent collaborator, composed a piece called "Trench Engaged" for the trench sequence.

== Marketing ==
In March 2017, before filming, a first look at Aquaman was shown during CinemaCon in Las Vegas, Nevada, with Momoa introducing a video of Wan displaying a concept art sizzle reel. Later, in July, the film's footage made its debut at San Diego Comic-Con with a teaser presented by Momoa during the Warner Bros. panel; Wan presented the footage, stating that "in a lot of ways, this is an origin story," In April 2018, another teaser, with new footage, was shown by Wan and Momoa at CinemaCon, joined by Amber Heard, Patrick Wilson and Yahya Abdul-Mateen II on stage. Wan teased the conflict between Arthur and Ocean Master, stating that "it's almost a very classic Shakespearean story about brother from another world vs. brother from another world. And it really is a classic story of sibling rivalry."

On June 11, 2018, the film's first trailer was previewed at CineEurope. In July 2018, the first trailer was released at SDCC 2018, considered the best received trailer; it was later attached to theatrical showings of Mission: Impossible – Fallout, The Meg, The Predator, Venom, and First Man. The cast appeared on Sunday, July 22, as guests on Conan with Conan O'Brien during SDCC. By late August the studio held early test screenings with mixed reactions shared on social media describing the film as good but not great. On October 5, 2018, a 5-minute Extended Video was released by Warner Bros. The first official TV spot for the film came on October 16, followed by a second on November 1. The same month, character posters were released for Aquaman, Mera, Black Manta, Ocean Master, King Nereus, Queen Atlanna and Nuidis Vulko.

On November 7, the studio announced the promotion tour schedule, which would take place during November and December with fan events, screenings and premieres, including Beijing, London, New York City, Manila, Los Angeles, Miami, Gold Coast, Sydney and Honolulu. Additionally, it was announced that the film would be screened on December 7, 2018, during Brazil Comic Con (CCXP) in São Paulo. The following week, an official behind the scenes featurette was released, which included footage not seen in the mainstream trailers. Two days later, the film's two main posters were released, depicting Aquaman and Mera in their costumes. On November 19 the final trailer was released, alongside the announcement of ticket sales. The same day, 30 minutes of footage was shown in China during the first stop of the film's promotion tour, generating rave reactions.

The film's financial success was attributed to the studio's marketing plan that attracted a broad demographic, particularly women, through advertising, social media and promotional partners.

== Release ==
=== Theatrical ===
Aquaman had its world premiere at the Empire, Leicester Square, in London on November 26, 2018. It was released in the United States by Warner Bros. Pictures on December 21. On November 19, Atom Tickets announced that Amazon Prime members in the United States would have early access to tickets for a December 15 screening of the film at select AMC, Regal, National Amusements, and ArcLight Cinemas.

It was previously set for July 27, 2018, and then moved to October 5, 2018, before settling on its release date.

=== Home media ===
Aquaman was released for digital download on March 5, 2019, and on Blu-ray, 4K Blu-ray Ultra HD, 3D Blu-ray and DVD on March 19. It has an estimated total of $27.4 million in US DVD sales, as well as an estimated total of $42.2 million in Blu-ray sales, bringing in a total of $69.7 million in domestic video sales. Wan stated there would not be a director's cut.

== Reception ==
=== Box office ===
Aquaman grossed $335.1 million in the United States and Canada and $816.9 million in other territories, for a total worldwide gross of $1.152 billion. It became the highest-grossing installment in the DCEU and the highest-grossing film based on any DC character as well as Warner Bros.' third-highest-grossing film worldwide behind Barbie ($1.446 billion) and Harry Potter and the Deathly Hallows – Part 2 ($1.342 billion). Deadline Hollywood calculated the net profit of the film to be $260.5 million when factoring together all expenses and revenues, making it the fifth-most-profitable release of 2018.

==== United States and Canada ====
The day after announcing the early Amazon screenings, Aquaman's first 24-hour pre-sale totals became the highest in the history of Atom Tickets, beating out Avengers: Infinity War as well as outpacing Jumanji: Welcome to the Jungle, another film Amazon Prime had offered early to subscribers the previous December. The film made $2.9 million from the Amazon preview screenings at 1,225 theaters, higher than the $1.86 million made by Jumanji: Welcome to the Jungle. In the United States and Canada, Aquaman was released alongside Bumblebee, Second Act and Welcome to Marwen and was projected to gross $65–70 million in its opening weekend and $120 million over its first five days (with some tracking figures going as high as $150 million). The film made $27.7 million on its first day, including $9 million from Thursday night previews (a total of $13.7 million including the Amazon screenings and a Wednesday preview). It went on to debut at $67.9 million ($72.6 million including all early showings), topping the box office but marking the lowest opening of the DCEU. It then made $10.9 million on Monday and $22 million on Christmas Day, one of six films to ever gross over $20 million on the holiday; its five-day total opening was $105.4 million. The film made $52.1 million in its second weekend, a drop of 23%, as well as $10.1 million on New Year's Eve and $16.8 million on New Year's Day. The film then remained in first place for a third consecutive weekend, grossing $31 million. The film made $17.4 million in its fourth weekend of release but was dethroned by The Upside, which exceeded expectations to become STX Films' first number one box office opening with $20.4 million. Aquaman also crossed the $1 billion mark that same weekend after earning $758.3 million and $940 million worldwide in both its second and third weekends.

Domestically, Aquaman's opening weekend audience was 60 percent male before falling to 56 percent on its second weekend. During the second holiday weekend, women over 25 rated the film the highest at 84%, with Deadline reporting, "Moms are out-numbering dads in attendance, 52% to 48%, and they're smitten with this DC superhero by a wide gap, 82% to 60%."

==== Other territories ====
In China, where the film was released two weeks prior to its US debut, the film made $24.6 million (¥169.5 million) on its first day, representing 86% of the market share and setting a Warner Bros. opening-day record in the country. It went on to debut at $93.6 million (¥644.8 million), marking the best-ever opening for the DCEU, Warner Bros,. and a December release in the country. It overtook the entire lifetime gross of Wonder Woman there in just three days. The film grossed $12.99 million on Monday, thus crossing $100 million ($107.7 million). By Thursday, its fifth day, the film had made $135.3 million, surpassing the lifetime totals of every solo Marvel Cinematic Universe film. As of April 4, 2019, the film had grossed $298.33 million in China. In the Philippines, Aquaman is the biggest Warner Bros. and DC film of all time, with a cumulative gross of PhP 536.4 million, surpassing Justice League and becoming the 6th-most-successful film of all time in the country. The film became the highest-grossing film of the decade in Romania. South Korea was the second-biggest market with $39.1 million.

=== Critical response ===
Review aggregator website Rotten Tomatoes reports that 66% of 412 critics gave the film a positive review, with an average rating of 6/10. The website's critical consensus reads: "Aquaman swims with its entertainingly ludicrous tide, offering up CGI superhero spectacle that delivers energetic action with an emphasis on good old-fashioned fun." Metacritic surveyed 50 critics and assigned a weighted average score of 55 out of 100, indicating "mixed or average" reviews. Audiences surveyed by CinemaScore gave the film an average grade of "A−" on an A+ to F scale, while those polled by PostTrak gave it four out of five stars.

Peter Debruge of Variety criticized the dialogue but praised the production design, action scenes and the final act, writing, "The biggest surprise here is how, after the running time of a standard-length film has elapsed, Aquaman suddenly kicks the movie up a level for the finale. At just the moment this critic's eyes tend to glaze over in superhero movies—typically, as the villain goes nuclear and a portal to another dimension opens, threatening to destroy the planet—Wan unleashes a massive deep-sea battle on par with The Lord of the Rings." Germain Lussier of io9 wrote "Aquaman is all about spectacle. It's filled with ambition. It's always about trying to put the coolest, most imaginative sequence on-screen at every single turn of the story, no matter what the cost." Writing for TheWrap, William Bibbiani called the film "a weird and wonderful superhero adventure that strives—and almost succeeds—to be the most epic superhero movie ever made."

The A.V. Club's Ignatiy Vishnevetsky gave the movie a B− grade: "Unfortunately for Arthur (and for us, the landlubbers), his half-brother King Orm (Patrick Wilson) has set out to wage war against the surface in a bid to take over all of the undersea kingdoms and have himself declared "Ocean Master." The first utterance of these words, "Ocean Master," is accompanied by an honest-to-goodness dum-dum-dum. But then again, Aquaman is the sort of the movie that casts Dolph Lundgren as an undersea monarch who rides a giant seahorse. It is also the sort of movie that ends with a freeze frame, and includes dialogue along the lines of, "You have our mother’s trident—powerful, but flawed, like her." It owns up to its cheese."

Writing for Rolling Stone, Peter Travers gave the film two-and-a-half stars out of five, praising Wan's ambition and Momoa's performance but criticizing the plot and dialogue, writing: "Aquaman is a mess of clashing tones and shameless silliness, but a relief after all the franchise's recent superhero gloom." Chris Nashawaty of Entertainment Weekly graded the film a C−, writing, "It can't decide if it wants to be silly or serious—a superhero movie or a parody of one...Unfortunately, the bloated, waterlogged film is loaded with crummy CGI, cheesy costumes, and groaner dialogue delivered by actors who are too good to traffic in such nonsense". For the Chicago Tribune, Michael Phillips gave the film 1.5 stars out of four, criticizing the film's script and Wan's direction, saying, "Watching this movie is like spending two hours and 27 minutes staring at a gigantic aquarium full of digital sea creatures and actors on wires, pretending to swim."

Matt Zoller Seitz of RogerEbert.com gave Aquaman three-and-a-half out of four stars, positively comparing the film to SpongeBob SquarePants in its lack of concern for scientific accuracy, along with praising the treatment of characters crying as "a normal byproduct of pain or joy" instead of "a shameful loss of dignity". Seitz stated "It takes skill to be as ridiculous as this movie.... [Aquaman]... feels simultaneously like a spoof and an operatic melodrama. Any film that can combine those modes is a force to be reckoned with."

=== Accolades ===
Award	Date of ceremony	Category	Recipients	Result	Ref.
Alliance of Women Film Journalists	January 10, 2019	Outstanding Achievement by A Woman in The Film Industry	Nicole Kidman for a banner year of performances in Destroyer, Boy Erased and Aquaman, and for opening opportunity for women in production.	Nominated	
Dorian Awards	January 12, 2019	Campy Film of the Year	Aquaman	Nominated	
Gold Derby Awards	January 30, 2019	Best Visual Effects	Kelvin McIlwain, Jeff White, Bryan Hirota, Kimberly Nelson LoCascio	Nominated	
Visual Effects Society Awards	February 5, 2019	Outstanding Created Environment in a Photoreal Feature	Quentin Marmier, Aaron Barr, Jeffrey De Guzman, Ziad Shureih for "Atlantis"	Nominated	
Visual Effects Society Awards	February 5, 2019	Outstanding Virtual Cinematography in a Photoreal Project	Claus Pedersen, Mohammad Rastkar, Cedric Lo, Ryan McCoy for "Third Act Battle"	Nominated	
Make-Up Artists and Hair Stylists Guild Awards	February 16, 2019	Best Special Make-Up Effects	Justin Raleigh, Ozzy Alvarez, Sean Genders	Nominated	
Golden Reel Awards	February 17, 2019	Feature Film – Music Underscore	J.J. George & Paul Rabjohns (music editors)	Nominated	
Costume Designers Guild Awards	February 19, 2019	Excellence in Sci-Fi/Fantasy Film	Kym Barrett	Nominated	
SXSW Film Design Award	March 12, 2019	Excellence in Title Design	Aaron Becker, Simon Clowes	Nominated	
Kids' Choice Awards	March 23, 2019	Favorite Movie	Aquaman	Nominated	
Kids' Choice Awards	March 23, 2019	Favorite Movie Actor	Jason Momoa	Nominated	
Kids' Choice Awards	March 23, 2019	Favorite Superhero	Jason Momoa	Nominated	
Golden Trailer Awards	May 29, 2019	Best Home Ent Fantasy Adventure	Aquaman, Target Wall "I Am", Warner Bros., Aspect	Nominated	
MTV Movie & TV Awards	June 17, 2019	Best Kiss	Jason Momoa and Amber Heard	Nominated	
Saturn Awards	September 13, 2019	Best Comic-to-Film Motion Picture	Aquaman	Nominated	
Saturn Awards	September 13, 2019	Best Director	James Wan	Nominated	
Saturn Awards	September 13, 2019	Best Supporting Actress	Amber Heard	Nominated	
Saturn Awards	September 13, 2019	Best Editing	Kirk Morri	Nominated	
Saturn Awards	September 13, 2019	Best Production Design	Bill Brzeski	Nominated	
Saturn Awards	September 13, 2019	Best Costume Design	Kym Barrett	Nominated	
Teen Choice Awards	August 11, 2019	Choice Sci-Fi/Fantasy Movie	Aquaman	Nominated	
Teen Choice Awards	August 11, 2019	Choice Sci-Fi/Fantasy Movie Actor	Jason Momoa	Nominated	
Teen Choice Awards	August 11, 2019	Choice Sci-Fi/Fantasy Movie Actress	Amber Heard	Nominated	
Teen Choice Awards	August 11, 2019	Choice Movie Villain	Patrick Wilson	Nominated	
Chinese American Film Festival	November 3, 2019	Most Popular U.S. Film in China	Aquaman	Won	
AACTA Award	December 4, 2019	Best Visual Effects or Animation	Kelvin McIlwain, Kimberly Nelson LoCascio, Josh Simmonds, David Nelson	Nominated	

== Future ==
=== Sequel ===
A sequel, Aquaman and the Lost Kingdom, was released on December 22, 2023, with Wan returning as director along with Johnson-McGoldrick as the screenwriter. Momoa, Wilson, Heard, Abdul-Mateen II, Park, Lundgren, Morrison, and Kidman reprised their roles.

=== Animated miniseries ===
In January 2020, a three-part animated mini-series based on Aquaman was announced, with Wan set to serve as executive producer, and to premiere on HBO Max. Although non-canonical to the wider DCEU, Aquaman: King of Atlantis would be set after the events of Aquaman, explicitly referencing its events throughout, and feature the voices of Cooper Andrews, Gillian Jacobs, Thomas Lennon, and Dana Snyder respectively replacing Momoa, Heard, Wilson, and Dafoe in their roles. On February 17, 2021, the Television Critics Association had a press junket with HBO Max, in which a promotional image was released. On September 1, 2021, it was announced the series will air on Cartoon Network as part of the ACME Night block. The series premiered on October 14, 2021 but was removed from HBO Max in August 2022.

=== Unproduced spin-off ===
In early February 2019, Warner Bros. hired Noah Gardner and Aidan Fitzgerald to write the script for a "horror-tinged" Aquaman spin-off film titled The Trench, based on one of the kingdoms introduced in the first film. It was expected to have a smaller budget and not feature the main cast of Aquaman, with Wan and Safran producing. Safran said he and Wan were approaching the Aquaman franchise similarly to the Conjuring Universe, with spin-offs like The Trench exploring stories about the underwater kingdoms alongside the "mothership" films starring Arthur Curry. In April 2021, Warner Bros. and DC announced that development on The Trench was no longer moving forward, with the studios not having room for the spin-off on their slate of films and believing Aquaman 2 to be enough of an expansion of the franchise for the time being; Wan later revealed that The Trench had been the working title and a misdirect for a planned Black Manta film.

== See also ==
- List of underwater science fiction works
- List of films featuring dinosaurs
