= Aquaman and the Lost Kingdom =

2023 superhero film by James Wan

- Theatrical release poster
- Directed by: James Wan
- Screenplay by: David Leslie Johnson-McGoldrick
- Story by: James Wan; David Leslie Johnson-McGoldrick; Jason Momoa; Thomas Pa'a Sibbett
- Based on: Characters from DC
- Produced by: Peter Safran; James Wan; Rob Cowan
- Starring: Jason Momoa; Patrick Wilson; Amber Heard; Yahya Abdul-Mateen II; Randall Park; Dolph Lundgren; Temuera Morrison; Martin Short; Nicole Kidman
- Cinematography: Don Burgess
- Edited by: Kirk Morri
- Music by: Rupert Gregson-Williams
- Production companies: Warner Bros. Pictures; DC Entertainment; Atomic Monster; The Safran Company
- Distributed by: Warner Bros. Pictures
- Release dates: December 19, 2023 (The Grove); December 22, 2023 (United States)
- Running time: 124 minutes
- Country: United States
- Language: English
- Budget: $205–215 million
- Box office: $440.18 million

Aquaman and the Lost Kingdom is a 2023 American superhero film based on the DC Comics character Aquaman. Directed by James Wan from a screenplay by David Leslie Johnson-McGoldrick, it is the sequel to Aquaman (2018) and the 15th and final film in the DC Extended Universe (DCEU). Jason Momoa stars as Arthur Curry / Aquaman, who must work with his half-brother Orm (Patrick Wilson) to prevent Black Manta (Yahya Abdul-Mateen II) from killing his family and using the cursed Black Trident to overheat the world while searching for the lost seventh kingdom of the seas. Amber Heard, Randall Park, Dolph Lundgren, Temuera Morrison, Martin Short, and Nicole Kidman also star in supporting roles. Wan also produced the film with Peter Safran and Rob Cowan for Warner Bros. Pictures.

Momoa pitched a story for an Aquaman sequel during the first film's production. Wan did not want to rush a sequel after the first film's commercial success but agreed in January 2019 to oversee development. Johnson-McGoldrick signed on to return as screenwriter a month later, and Wan was confirmed to be returning as director in August 2020. He said the film would expand on Aquaman's worldbuilding, have a more serious tone, and feature themes such as climate change. Contrarily, the final product is presented as a buddy comedy between Aquaman and Orm, and was inspired by the Silver Age of Comic Books with a retro science fiction vibe similar to the works of animator Ray Harryhausen and horror films of the 1960s, specifically Planet of the Vampires (1965). Wan announced the sequel's title in June 2021, and principal photography began later that month and concluded in January 2022. Filming took place in the United Kingdom, Hawaii, Los Angeles, and New Jersey, with additional filming in New Zealand. Several reshoots took place between July 2022 and June 2023 to alter the storyline while some actors' roles were reduced, including Heard's, whose involvement was the subject of controversy during production.

Aquaman and the Lost Kingdom premiered at a fan event at the Grove, Los Angeles on December 19, 2023, and was released in the United States on December 22. The film received negative reviews from critics and grossed $440.18 million worldwide against a production budget of $205–215 million.

== Plot ==
Four years after becoming king of Atlantis, (Note: As depicted in Aquaman (2018)) Arthur Curry has married Mera and has a son, Arthur Jr., while splitting his life between land and sea. Meanwhile, David Kane / Black Manta continues to seek revenge against Arthur for his father's death, working with marine biologist Stephen Shin to find Atlantean artifacts. When Shin accidentally discovers a cavern in Antarctica, Manta finds a Black Trident that possesses him, its creator promising to give him the power to destroy Arthur and Atlantis. Five months later, Manta breaks into an Orichalcum reserve on Atlantis to steal it and power his Atlantean machines, which are of ancient origin but of unknown design to modern Atlanteans. Caught midway, they are chased by Atlantean forces, with Mera injured in the ensuing battle. Arthur learns that this usage of Orichalcum, which emits high quantities of greenhouse gases, has not only raised planetary temperatures and caused extreme weather and ocean acidification, but also nearly caused a planetary extinction in the past, when used by an ancient Atlantean kingdom.

To learn where Manta is hiding, Arthur breaks his half-brother Orm out of prison. Together, they visit a pirate haven called the Sunken Citadel, where they meet Kingfish to learn of Manta's whereabouts. The information they obtain leads them to a volcanic island in the South Pacific, where they battle Manta's forces after navigating flora and fauna mutated by the Orichalcum. There, when Orm touches the Black Trident, it shows him visions of its provenance. Orm learns the trident was created by Kordax, the brother of King Atlan and ruler of the lost kingdom of Necrus. He was imprisoned with blood magic following a failed attempt to usurp the throne. Realizing the blood of any of Atlan's descendants could release Kordax, the pair deduce Manta has kidnapped Arthur Jr. With Shin's help, the Atlanteans determine that Kordax's prison and the lost kingdom of Necrus are located in Antarctica.

In Necrus, Arthur fights Manta and is almost killed before Mera arrives and saves him. Manta throws the Black Trident at her as she is taking her son to safety, but Orm catches it before it strikes her. The spirit of Kordax leaves Manta for Orm, who proceeds to fight Arthur and uses Arthur's blood to free Kordax. Arthur convinces Orm to give up his hatred for him, allowing him to destroy both Kordax and the Black Trident. With Kordax's magic vanishing, Necrus starts to collapse. Manta refuses Arthur's help, allowing himself to fall into a fissure. The Atlanteans and Shin safely escape and determine that Orm has redeemed himself. Arthur and Mera plan to inform Atlantis that he died, on the condition that he remain hidden and vacate Atlantis to the surface world. Believing the unification of the underwater kingdoms and the surface world is necessary to prevent further damage to the oceans and planet, Arthur reveals Atlantis' existence through an announcement at the United Nations, declaring his intentions of making the kingdom a member state.

== Cast ==
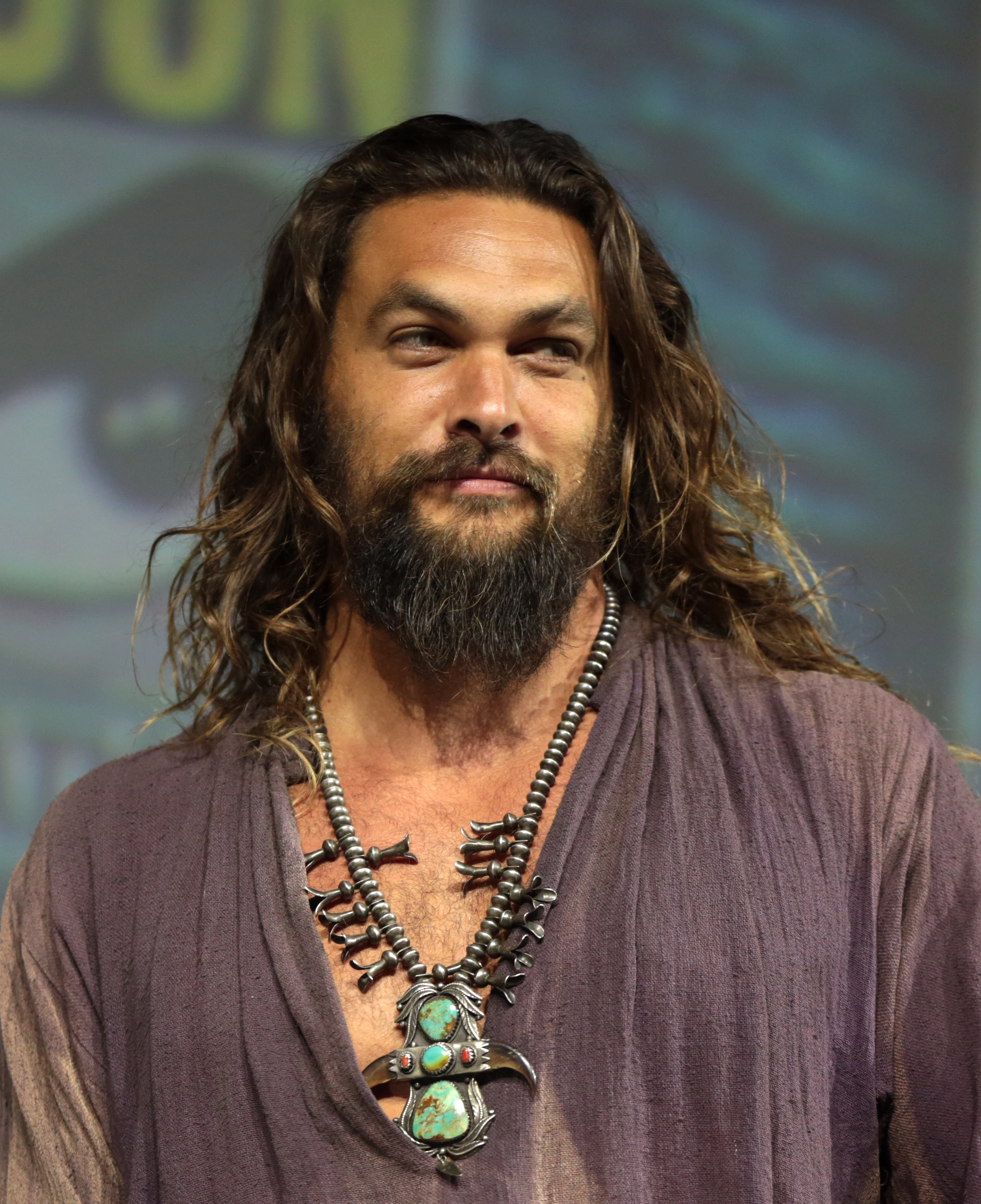
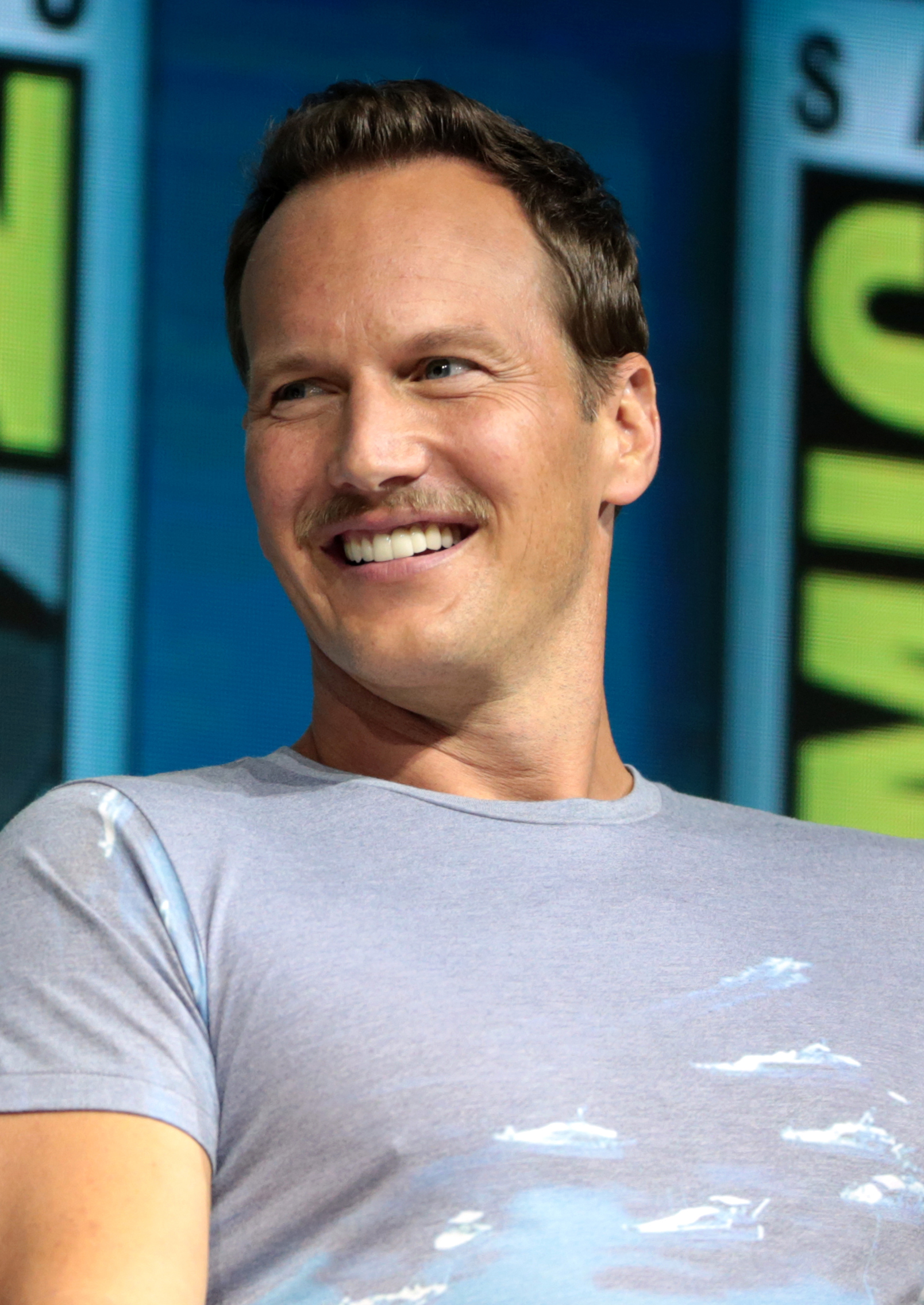
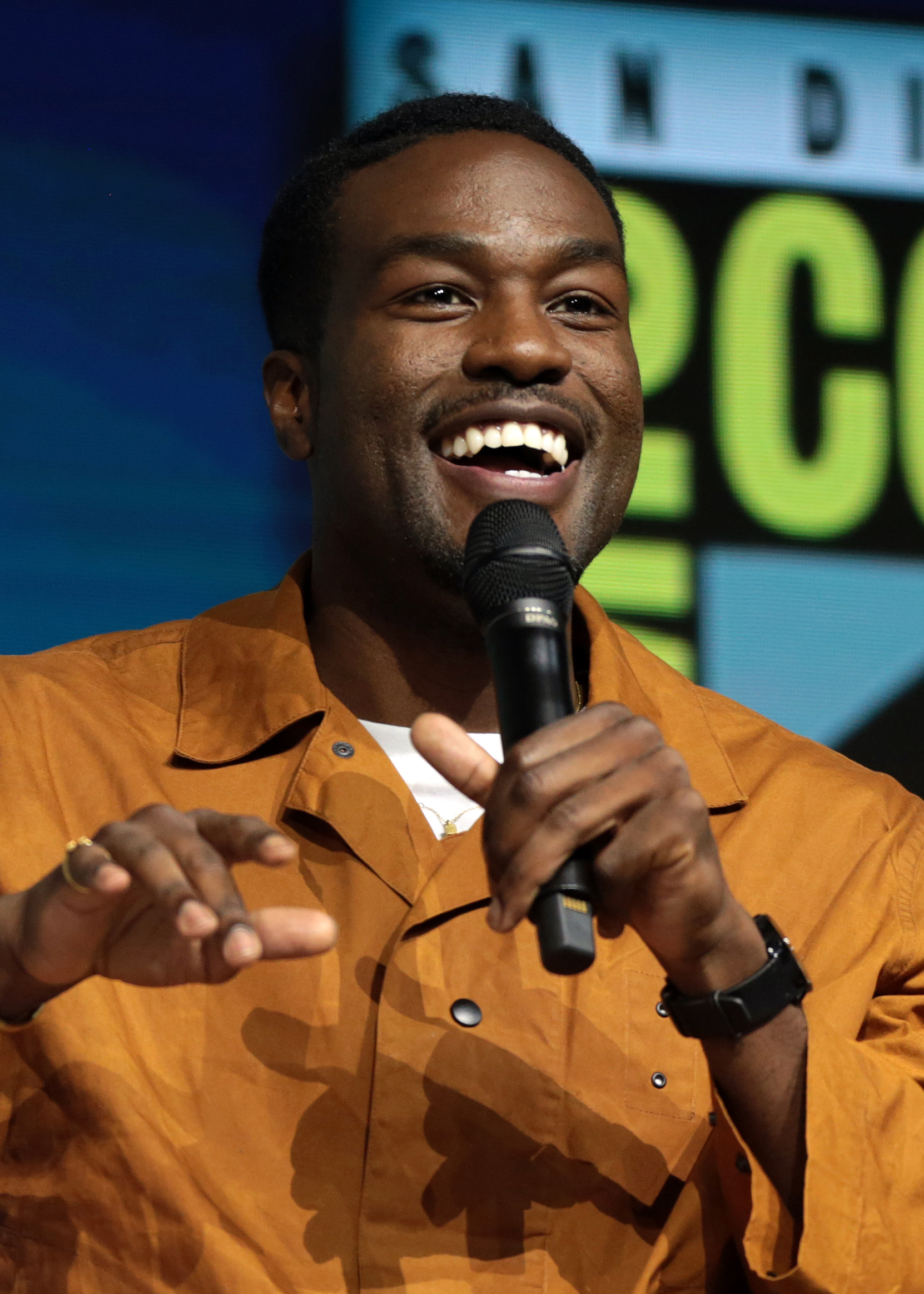
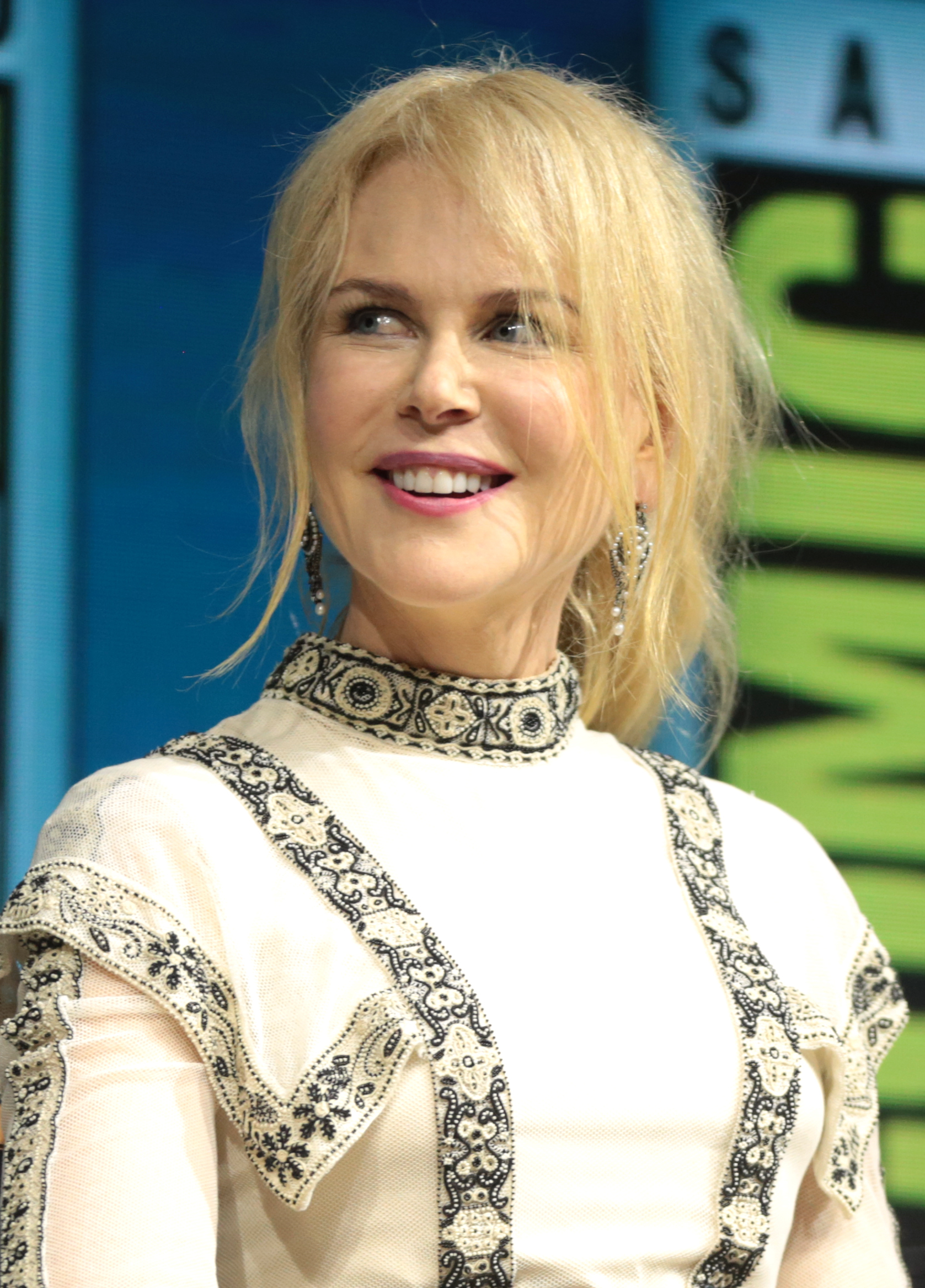
Jason Momoa and Patrick Wilson star in the film, which is a buddy comedy focused on the bromance relationship between their characters Aquaman and Orm, while Yahya Abdul-Mateen II and Nicole Kidman were given larger roles than in the first film, respectively, as the main antagonist and Aquaman's advisor.
- Jason Momoa as Arthur Curry / Aquaman:
  The half-Atlantean, half-human king of Atlantis who can swim at supersonic speeds and summon and command aquatic life, and is the father of Arthur Jr. with Mera. Producer Peter Safran called Arthur the "ultimate outsider", explaining he "doesn't believe he's part of the surface world or Atlantis" and he never felt he belonged in either world. Director James Wan said the film was a true continuation of the character's story from the first film Aquaman (2018), explaining that Arthur is forced to juggle his duties as the king of Atlantis with his role as a father while protecting both his family and kingdom. Safran said the heart of the story is that Arthur is a superhero who is both human and superhuman, involved in an epic battle with high stakes. Wan felt that including Arthur Jr. in the film was a natural extension of the first film and contrasted Arthur's role as king with the juxtaposition of his domestic responsibilities as a father.
- Patrick Wilson as Orm Marius:
  Arthur's Atlantean half-brother and the former king of Atlantis who is stripped of his title as the Ocean Master. He is imprisoned in the Sahara desert by the Deserter tribe for assassinating the Fisherman King, with a limited water supply to dampen his powers, causing him to bear a gaunt and scraggly appearance. Orm is freed from prison and recruited by Arthur to help find and defeat Black Manta.
- Amber Heard as Mera:
  Arthur's wife and the mother of Arthur Jr., who can control water. She is the queen of Atlantis and the former princess of Xebel, as well as King Nereus' daughter. The character is injured early in the film and recovers for much of its events, before joining Aquaman, Orm, and Atlanna in their journey to defeat Black Manta. Several of Heard's scenes were cut during reshoots.
- Yahya Abdul-Mateen II as David Kane / Black Manta:
  A ruthless pirate and high-seas mercenary who uses an Atlantean armored suit and wields the powerful Black Trident, seeking to kill Arthur and his family as revenge for the death of his father. Wan said Black Manta's love for his father and need to avenge his death take a darker turn in the film, with the character becoming more powerful. The director had planned while working on the first film to have Black Manta, who he described as having been a "glorified side character", return as the main antagonist in its sequel, opting to establish his conflictive relationship with Arthur to give him a bigger role in this film. Black Manta seeks to obtain blood from a descendant of the Atlantean king Atlan to free the Black Trident's creator Kordax from his imprisonment in the lost kingdom of Necrus, and commands an army of undead warriors from Necrus using the Black Trident which possesses him. Wan said Black Manta's suit, which forgoes the all-black power suit from the first film for a design that was remade in all-silver and more accurate to the comics' version, as well as his ship and technology, were inspired by the aesthetic of the Silver Age Aquaman comics and Ivan Reis's The New 52 comics.
- Randall Park as Dr. Stephen Shin: A marine biologist obsessed with finding Atlantis who works for Black Manta after rescuing him in the first film
- Dolph Lundgren as Nereus: The king of Xebel and Mera's father. Lundgren had a larger role in the original version of the film, which he said was reduced during reshoots.
- Temuera Morrison as Thomas Curry: Arthur's father who works as a lighthouse keeper at Amnesty Bay
- Martin Short as the voice of Kingfish:
  A gigantic piscine humanoid of indeterminate species and the confident ruler of the Sunken Citadel, an underwater pirate haven, whom Arthur and Orm visit to locate Black Manta. He has a smarmy and cocky voice, behaves like a classical Roman emperor with an extravagant lifestyle and lady servants, and is guarded by humanoid hammerhead shark bodyguards.
- Nicole Kidman as Atlanna:
  Arthur and Orm's mother and the former queen of Atlantis. Atlanna's role as Arthur's advisor on how the underwater world works was able to be expanded upon given the absence of Nuidis Vulko, who served in that role in the first film and is revealed to have been killed off-screen due to a plague indirectly caused by Black Manta's actions in this film and humanity's pollution from the land affecting the oceans.

New additions to the cast are Vincent Regan as Atlan, the first king of Atlantis, replacing Graham McTavish from the first film; Jani Zhao as Stingray, a loyal member of Black Manta's crew; Indya Moore as Karshon, an Atlantean and the leader of the High Council of the Seven Kingdoms who serves as a political barrier for Arthur by opposing his desire to reveal Atlantis to the human world; and Pilou Asbæk as Kordax, the undead king of the lost kingdom of Necrus, the Black City, who was Atlan's brother and the creator of the cursed Black Trident, through which Kordax's evil spirit possesses Black Manta. Karshon is not a humanoid shark character as depicted in the comics, while this version of Kordax is a composite character of the original comics' version and Orin, which was the name of Atlan's brother and Aquaman in some comic iterations.

Underwater creatures of the Seven Kingdoms returning from the first film are the Brine King, voiced by John Rhys-Davies and physically portrayed on-set by Andrew Crawford; Storm, a giant seahorse and Arthur's steed; and the octopus T.O.P.O., which stands for "Tactical Observation and Pursuit Operative", who is a tactical covert operative for Atlantis that aids Arthur in freeing Orm and on their quest, in addition to playing several instruments, such as the drums. Wan said T.O.P.O., who was created through visual effects, was a "real character" in the film after briefly appearing in the first film, with an undisclosed actor occasionally standing in for T.O.P.O. with a stick puppet for Momoa to act against. The director described the character and Arthur as having a fun, slightly antagonistic relationship, while Momoa said T.O.P.O. added a lot of comedy which complemented Arthur being "very salty". Various infants portray Arthur and Mera's son Arthur Jr., who has similar water-based abilities as his parents. Safran's wife Natalia makes a cameo appearance as a member of the High Council, while Michael Beach appears uncredited as Black Manta's father Jesse Kane through archive footage from the first film. Beach was approached to film some flashback scenes, but was unavailable due to scheduling issues.

== Production ==
=== Development ===
==== Interest and early work ====
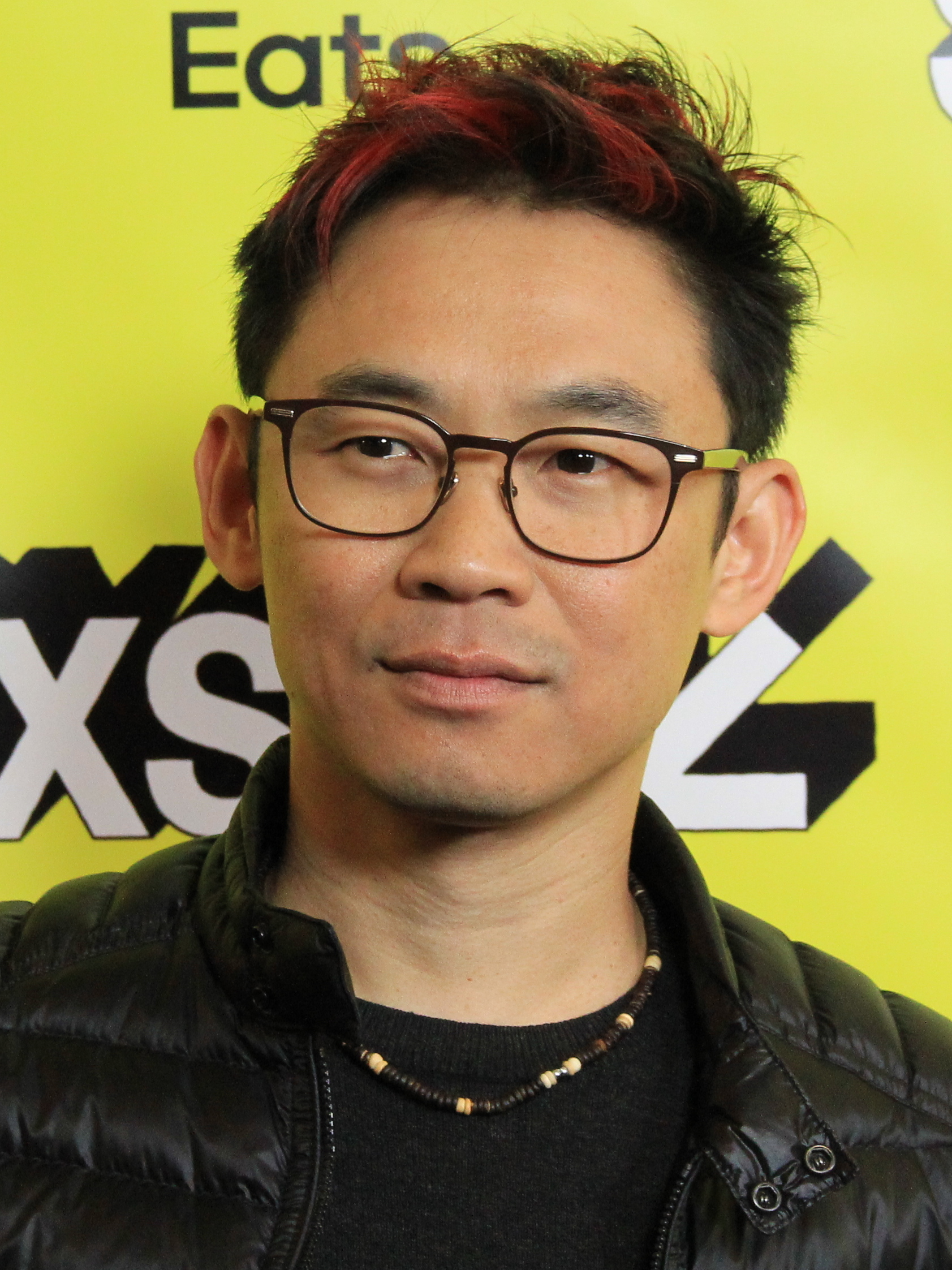
James Wan returned as director from the first film after choosing not to rush a sequel

During the production of Aquaman (2018), star Jason Momoa developed a story pitch for a sequel that he gave to Warner Bros. Pictures Group chairman Toby Emmerich and producer Peter Safran. In October 2018, before the film's release, Momoa said he would be more involved in the development of a potential sequel and expected filming to begin in 2019. Director James Wan said several storylines could spin out from Aquaman, with that film introducing seven underwater kingdoms that had yet to be fully explored. Momoa and his producing partner Brian Mendoza wrote a 50-page treatment for the sequel, which Warner Bros. bought but did not entirely follow, and the actor was paid $15 million for his involvement. Emmerich had enough confidence in box office projections for the film by early December to begin discussing a sequel. By the end of January 2019, when Aquaman was set to become the highest-grossing film based on a single DC Comics character, Warner Bros. was in negotiations with Wan to oversee the development and writing of a sequel with the potential to return as director. Geoff Boucher of Deadline Hollywood noted that Wan had been very protective of sequels to his previous films Insidious (2010) and The Conjuring (2013), and was "deeply invested" in the worldbuilding of Aquaman. Wan had previously compared the world of Aquaman to other fictional worlds such as Middle-earth, the Star Wars galaxy, and the Wizarding World.

In early February 2019, Warner Bros. hired Noah Gardner and Aidan Fitzgerald to write the script for a "horror-tinged" Aquaman spin-off film titled The Trench, based on one of the kingdoms introduced in the first film. It was expected to have a smaller budget and not feature the main cast of Aquaman, with Wan and Safran producing. Borys Kit of The Hollywood Reporter reported then that there had not yet been serious discussions about a direct sequel to Aquaman between the studio, Wan, and Momoa, due to them wanting to have a "breather" first, but several days later he reported that active development on a sequel was getting underway with the first film's co-writer, and frequent Wan collaborator, David Leslie Johnson-McGoldrick signing on to write the screenplay. Wan and Safran were producing the sequel; however, it was still unclear if Wan would direct it. At the end of February, Warner Bros. scheduled Aquaman 2 for release on December 16, 2022. The next month, Safran explained that he and Wan did not want to rush a sequel, and Warner Bros. had been supportive of that, which is why the film's release was scheduled for four years after the first film. He added that they were approaching the Aquaman franchise similarly to The Conjuring Universe, with spin-offs like The Trench exploring stories about the underwater kingdoms alongside the "mothership" films featuring Aquaman. Safran said Wan knew "the architecture, the armory, the military, the look, the feel, [and] the general vibe" of each of the seven kingdoms and wanted to explore them all in future projects.

In July 2019, Wan was set to direct the film Malignant (2021) before beginning work on Aquaman 2. Patrick Wilson said in November that he had discussed plans for the sequel with Wan and indicated that he would be reprising his role as Orm Marius / Ocean Master from the first film. A month later, Yahya Abdul-Mateen II confirmed that he was returning as David Kane / Black Manta, and was looking to flesh out the character. Johnson-McGoldrick stated in March 2020 that the sequel would not be based on a specific comic book, but was taking inspiration from the Aquaman stories of the Silver Age of Comic Books that featured Black Manta as the villain. According to Joe Manganiello, there were early plans for him to reprise his role as Slade Wilson / Deathstroke from the DCEU film Justice League (2017) as the antagonist before his character was chosen to next appear in other DCEU films. Wan was confirmed to be directing the sequel at the virtual DC FanDome event in August, when Wilson was also confirmed to return. Wan said it would be more serious than the first film and feature themes that were more relevant to the real world, such as climate change. He said the creatives were not afraid to address this on a big scale through the film, noting that the Aquaman character is environmentally conscious in the comics and fights to keep the ocean clean. He also affirmed that the film would remain a "fun action-fantasy movie". Momoa said a scene was featured in the film in which Aquaman addresses the United Nations on climate change, with the actor having previously done so at the UN's Ocean Conference. Wan added that the film would include more worldbuilding and exploration of the underwater kingdoms, and would feature some horror elements similar to the Trench sequence in the first film. Being able to expand on the worldbuilding of the first film was one of the key reasons that Wan chose to direct the sequel, along with Johnson-McGoldrick's script, which Wan felt had a "really cool story to bring all these characters back, and then growing them in a big way". Safran felt embracing the mythic nature of the Aquaman character and pairing that with the film's worldbuilding and visual storytelling made the film compelling. He and Momoa both believed the film's humor exceeded that of the first film, while Wan said Aquaman was at the center of the film with his charm and humor.

==== Amber Heard casting controversy ====
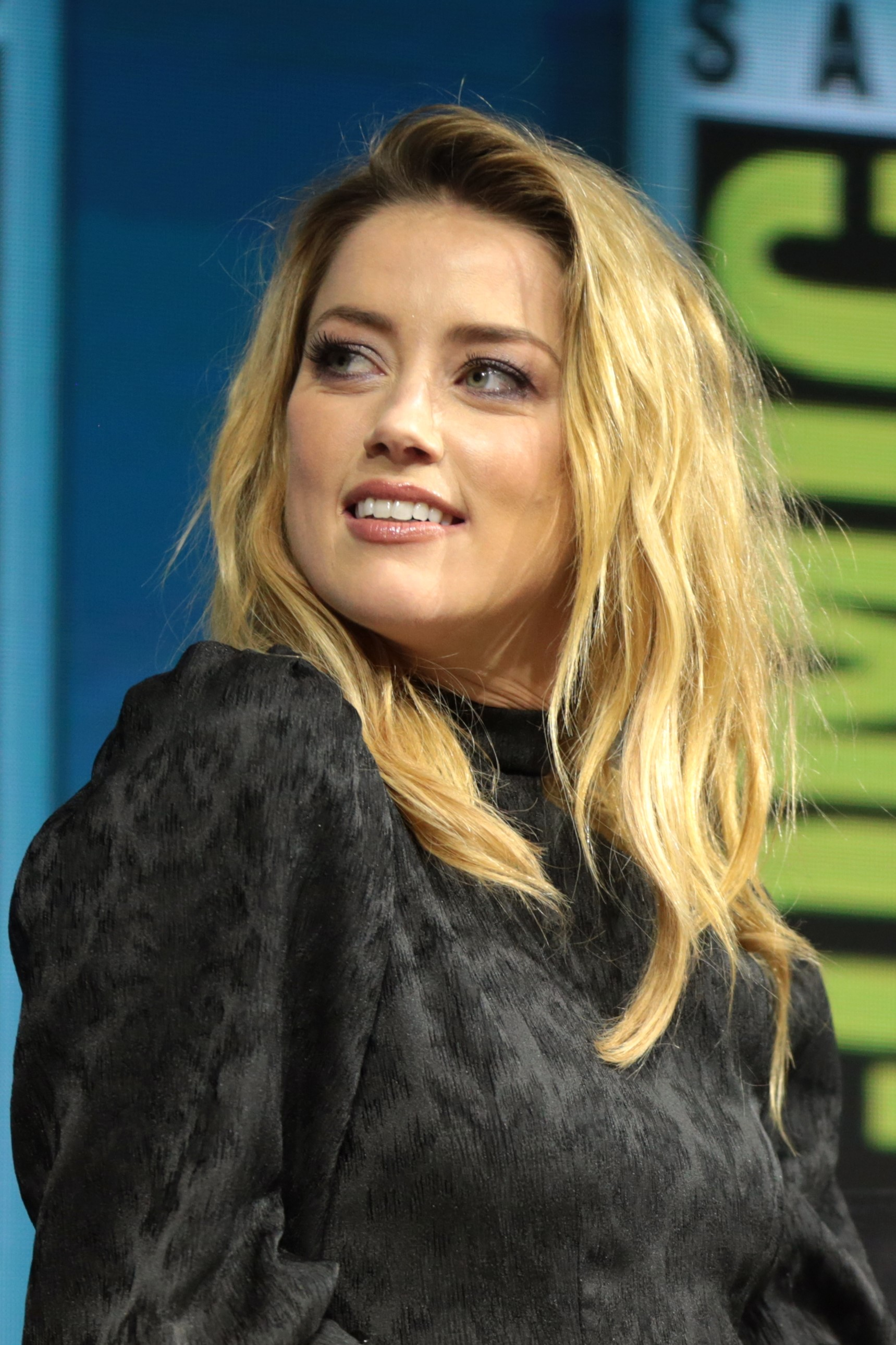
Amber Heard's casting in the film was the subject of controversy and various reports regarding the extent of her role, in part due to her off-screen legal issues.

Amber Heard debunked rumors in November 2020 that she would not be reprising her role as Mera from the first film following allegations of domestic abuse made against her by her ex-husband Johnny Depp. That month, a petition to have Heard fired from the franchise received more than 1.5 million signatures, and came after Warner Bros. removed Depp from Fantastic Beasts: The Secrets of Dumbledore (2022) when allegations made by The Sun that Depp abused Heard were ruled to be "substantially true" in the defamation lawsuit Depp v News Group Newspapers Ltd, filed against The Sun's owner. Safran said they never considered making the film without Heard and would not react to the "pure fan pressure" of the petition and other social media conversations. However, Heard later stated, during a second defamation trial in Depp v. Heard that was brought against her by Depp over a column in The Washington Post, that "they didn't want to include" her in the film, and that she had to fight to keep her part. She claimed that revisions were made to the script that reduced her role to a "very pared down version", including removing action sequences for her character, and she was unable to renegotiate her option contract that stipulated she would earn $2 million for the sequel, which was double what she made for the first film. By that point, in May 2022, the petition to have Heard removed from the film had received more than four million signatures.

DC Films president Walter Hamada testified during Depp and Heard's defamation trial that the studio considered recasting Mera, but only because of concerns about Heard's lack of chemistry with Momoa, not the abuse allegations. He added that it was the studio's philosophy to "hold people to their options" and not to renegotiate contracts, and said the size of Heard's role had not changed during the sequel's development. Hamada explained that the film was always intended to be a buddy comedy that focused on the relationship between Aquaman and Orm. Safran compared this relationship to that of Nick Nolte and Eddie Murphy's characters in the film 48 Hrs. (1982), while Wan said the film was written as a "bromance action-adventure" story focused on that relationship with the two brothers "overcoming their differences to save the world", compared to the first film which focused on Aquaman's relationship with Mera.

Tatiana Siegel at Variety reported that Heard had been "nearly fired" from the sequel after the first film's release due to the chemistry concerns, but these plans were abandoned after her ex-boyfriend Elon Musk intervened. Siegel also reported that the "lack-of-chemistry narrative" had been disputed, citing that Heard had performed a chemistry test with Momoa on the first film and had been cast over two other actresses, including Abbey Lee. Heard described her experience with Momoa and Wan on the film's set as hostile, which was refuted by a DC spokesperson who called the production positive and collaborative. Depp v. Heard's jury ultimately found that both Heard and Depp defamed each other, with Heard having defamed Depp on three counts and Depp having defamed her on one count. Social media responses to the trial heavily favored Depp over Heard, with several memes and videos "mocking her testimony". In June 2022, reports emerged that Heard had been fired from the film following the trial; however, these claims were subsequently debunked. Heard ultimately appeared for around 20 minutes in the film, with two of her scenes—a fight sequence with Black Manta and a love scene with Momoa—reportedly cut during production. Several commentators noted upon the film's release that many of Heard's scenes had been removed and that the remaining scenes appeared to be "clunky" and "awkward". Actor Dolph Lundgren, who portrays Mera's father Nereus, later said that he and Heard had larger roles in the original cut and script before they were reduced during reshoots.

=== Pre-production ===
In February 2021, Lundgren revealed that he would be reprising his role as Nereus in the sequel, with filming expected to begin later that year in London. A month later, the planned start date for filming was revealed to be in June. However, there was potential for this to be impacted by the COVID-19 pandemic. Richard Sale was also revealed to be serving as the costume designer, after previously serving as an assistant costume designer on DC's Wonder Woman 1984 (2020). IWC Schaffhausen created red and blue glowing Super-LumiNova prop watches for the film, which were worn by Abdul-Mateen II and Randall Park. In April, Warner Bros. and DC announced that development on The Trench was no longer moving forward, with the studios not having room for the spin-off on their slate of films and believing Aquaman 2 to be enough of an expansion of the franchise for the time being; Wan later revealed that The Trench had been the working title and a misdirect for a planned Black Manta film. Later that month, Pilou Asbæk entered talks to join the film's cast. Momoa said in May that he would begin filming in July, and Wan announced a month later that the sequel was titled Aquaman and the Lost Kingdom, while Temuera Morrison confirmed his return as Aquaman's father Thomas Curry. Willem Dafoe was also reported to be reprising his role as Nuidis Vulko from the first film, but he ultimately did not appear, which Wan attributed to scheduling conflicts. The director felt that Vulko's absence allowed for Atlanna's role to be expanded as her son's advisor on how the underwater world works.

=== Filming ===
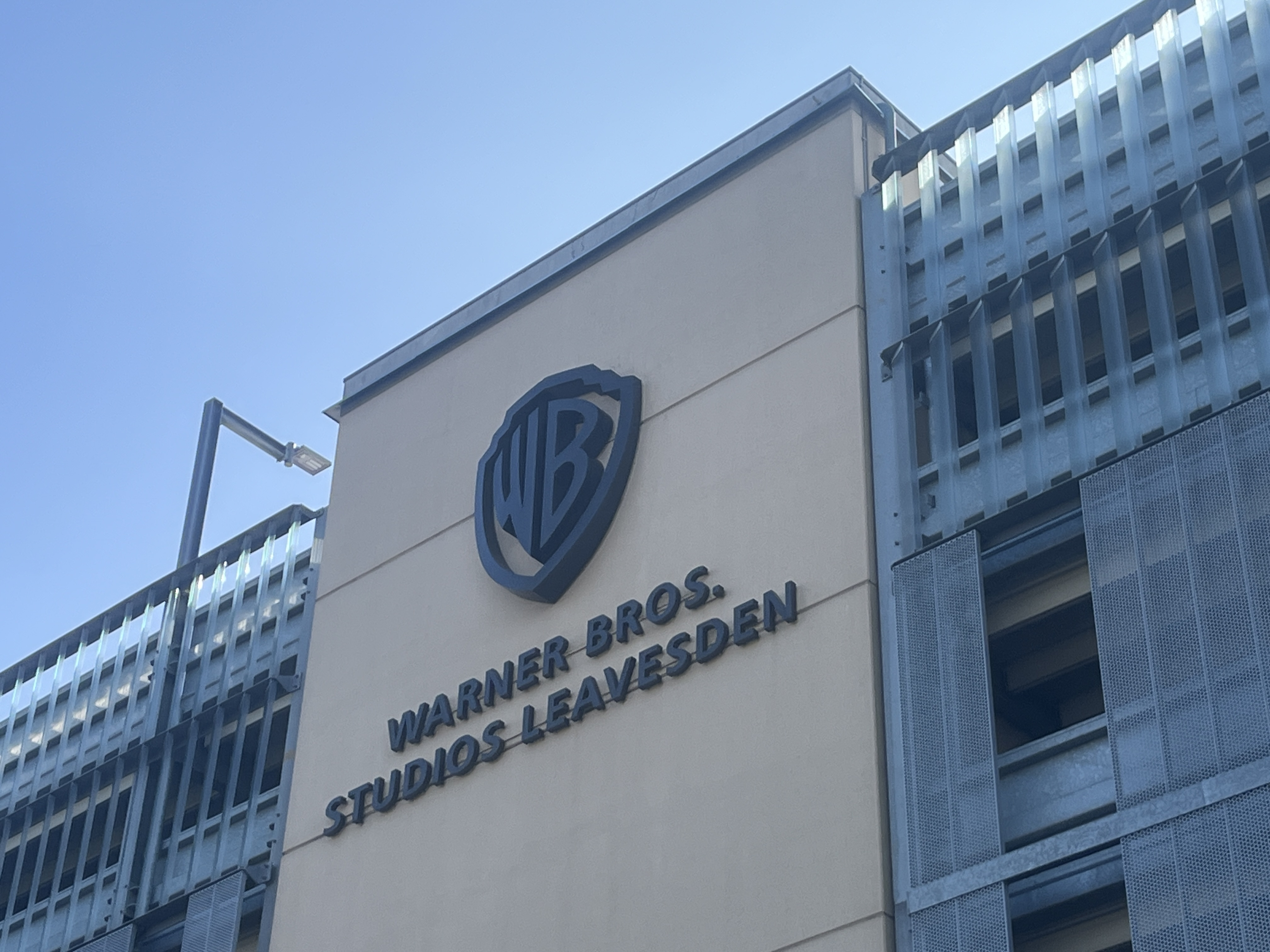
The Warner Bros. Studios Leavesden film studio served as the primary base of the film's production

Principal photography began on June 28, 2021, using five stages and the backlot at Warner Bros. Studios Leavesden in Watford, England, alongside an external water tank. Filming used the working title Necrus, referring to the lost underwater kingdom of Necrus, which is featured in the film. Necrus, also known as "the Black City", debuted in Aquaman #30 (1966) as an unstable underwater city rivaling Atlantis that cannot be in the same location twice and originated from an alien satellite. Wan said it was fun designing the lost kingdom of Necrus, detailing it as a society with various vehicles and weapons, such as the individually operated machines called the Octobots that move in-and-out of water which Orm encounters. The kingdom's retrofuturistic design was inspired by the art depictions in the Silver Age Aquaman comics from the 1950s and '60s, but with a modern spin. Wan felt that Antarctica and its landscape were familiar, yet largely unvisited by much of the world, which allowed him to explore a heightened version of it in the lost kingdom. For the lost kingdom, the creatives incorporated ancient Atlantean technology—more advanced than typical human technology—into Black Manta's crew's uniforms and weapons, his colossal submarine, and the Octobots.

Many of the crew members returned from the first film, including Don Burgess as the cinematographer and Bill Brzeski as production designer, with the latter serving alongside Sahby Mehalla. The special effects and visual effects crew invented new technology and VFX rigs for the underwater scenes in the film so it would be easier for the actors to shoot their scenes, with 100 cameras capturing the performances and action scenes, which was then applied to 3D versions of the actors. This new setup was devised after Wan found the rigging system used for the first film to be complex, and because its equipment caused physical pain for the actors. Wan believed the new setup was more versatile and safe. Wan said the creatives wanted the sequel to provide a more immersive and exciting experience for audiences while expanding the story and characters, and explained that the depiction of Atlantis in the film was expanded upon from the first film by providing the city depths, residential areas, and an area inspired by Times Square, while also exploring some of its politics. Atlantis was also given more color and vibrancy. Safran felt the different look and feel of Atlantis was still anchored in what audiences liked from the first film, while still feeling fresh and new, highlighting Wan's ability to capture the fantasy and colors of the new worlds being explored. To create the various underwater worlds and creatures, Wan and the creatives transitioned away from the blue screen method used on the first film, and instead used the new Eyeline Studio technology, which saw the actors in circular booths surrounded by 136 cameras, which producer Rob Cowan said changed the creative and practical methods of shooting the film.

In August 2021, Wan said the sequel was strongly influenced by the film Planet of the Vampires (1965), as well as "old-school Euro-horror" and the stop motion monsters created by animator Ray Harryhausen. He said the film had a "very retro" look similar to the horror films of the 1960s, and featured unsettling mechanical creatures with an "old-school sci-fi and horror" feel, which was tied to Black Manta's role in the film. Brzeski compared the film to Harryhausen's work on the films The 7th Voyage of Sinbad (1958) and Jason and the Argonauts (1963) for being a fantastical adventure with a "great quest and monsters", such as the Deserter tribe which are located in the Sahara desert and evolved into vampiric creatures by relying on blood for moisture, while incorporating issues modern audiences could relate to. Wilson said they pushed the fight scenes and stunts further than the first film in addition to exploring the characters' relationships. He also revealed that the character T.O.P.O., an octopus playing drums, appears in the film. Wan said that following the positive reception to T.O.P.O.'s brief appearance in the first film, he and Johnson-McGoldrick decided to give the character a significant role in the sequel, and believed the inclusion of T.O.P.O. and other creatures from the Aquaman comics allowed audiences to know they were embracing the character's fictional world.

Location shooting took place in early September 2021 at the Saunton Sands beach in Devon, as well as at Piccadilly in the City of Westminster, London, and in Jersey City, New Jersey that year. Later that month, Asbæk's casting was confirmed, portraying Kordax, the undead king of Necrus. At this time, Randall Park was revealed to be returning from the first film as Dr. Stephen Shin, while the following actors joined the cast: Vincent Regan as the ancient king Atlan, replacing Graham McTavish who briefly portrayed the character in the first film; Jani Zhao as Stingray, an original character for the film, in her first English-language feature role; and Indya Moore as Karshon. After shooting 95 percent of the film in the United Kingdom, production moved to Hawaii for on-location shooting until December 9. Nicole Kidman was confirmed to have reprised her role as Aquaman's mother Atlanna shortly after that. Filming then moved to Los Angeles, and officially wrapped on January 12, 2022, in Malibu. Filming was completed on time and under budget, and reportedly needed around a week of reshoots.

=== Post-production ===
Warner Bros. adjusted its release schedule in March 2022 due to the COVID-19 pandemic's impact on visual effects vendors' workloads. Aquaman and the Lost Kingdom was moved to March 17, 2023, and The Flash was also moved from 2022 to 2023 to allow time for their visual effects work to be completed, while Shazam! Fury of the Gods was moved up to this film's previous release date because it would be ready for release earlier. Wan said that while he preferred the Christmas release timeframe for the film, he was thankful for this delay because it allowed for more time to work on the visual effects and its new technology, which he called groundbreaking, and said the film would not have made its prior release date. He had also been working on his director's cut at this time. Wilson also said that new VFX techniques were used for The Lost Kingdom and The Flash. In April 2022, Discovery, Inc. and WarnerMedia merged to become Warner Bros. Discovery (WBD), led by president and CEO David Zaslav. The new company was expected to restructure DC Entertainment, and Zaslav began searching for an equivalent to Marvel Studios president Kevin Feige to lead the new subsidiary. That June, the final writing credits for the film were revealed: Johnson-McGoldrick received screenplay credit, while the duos of Wan and Johnson-McGoldrick, and Momoa and his producing partner Thomas Pa'a Sibbett received story credit.

The film received several test screenings in the middle of 2022, which yielded mixed results, prompting a new cut. Two rounds of reshoots then took place between that point and the start of 2023, with Warner Bros. film chairs Michael De Luca and Pamela Abdy involved in editing the film. Momoa revealed in July 2022 that Ben Affleck was reprising his DC Extended Universe (DCEU) role of Bruce Wayne / Batman for reshoots on the Warner Bros. Studios backlot in Burbank, California. Aaron Couch of The Hollywood Reporter reported soon after that Michael Keaton had filmed a scene as his version of Bruce Wayne / Batman from director Tim Burton's Batman (1989) and Batman Returns (1992). Keaton's version was set to be introduced to the DCEU in The Flash before that film's release was pushed to after Aquaman and the Lost Kingdom's. The scene reportedly confused audiences during test screenings, and Couch felt this was why Affleck joined the reshoots. In August, Warner Bros. delayed the film to December 25, 2023, to help spread out the marketing and distribution costs for its feature films. This pushed the film's release to after the planned release of The Flash, which meant there was potential for Keaton's version of Batman to appear in the film instead of Affleck's. Keaton's cameo had reportedly been cut from the film by October. Around that time, De Luca and Abdy told Wan to reduce the budget for the reshoots because the film's budget had reached $205 million during production.

Safran and writer/director James Gunn were hired as the co-chairmen and co-CEOs of the newly formed DC Studios at the end of October. A week after starting their new roles, the pair had begun developing an eight-to-ten-year plan for a new franchise called the DC Universe (DCU) that would be a soft reboot of the DCEU. By the middle of November, Safran had been "fixing" The Lost Kingdom, while Gunn had provided notes on it by the following month. Momoa said in January 2023 that he had shot scenes with a couple of actors as Batman, but was unsure which would be included in the final cut. After further test screenings in early 2023, Gunn consulted on the film. In April, the film's release date was moved forward five days to December 20, 2023. The reshoots had concluded just before the 2023 Writers Guild of America strike began early the following month, and the studios approached a third set of reshoots – which increased the film's budget – to occur in New Zealand over five days in the middle of June with Momoa and Wilson. Those reshoots were completed in four days. By then, both Affleck and Keaton were excluded from the latest cut of the film due to Gunn and Safran's plans for the DCU; neither actor appeared in the final version of the film. Following the reshoots, the film's budget ultimately reached $215 million.

External videos
- Aquaman and the Lost Kingdom / Main on End Title Sequence / Filmograph presents the film's main-on-end title sequence, Vimeo video from Filmograph's channel

Explaining the reshoots, Wan said he had to make some adjustments during production as it had been challenging to keep track of the different versions of the DCEU while remaining mindful of other plans for the franchise, but was fortunate that the Aquaman films were "far removed" from the rest of the DCEU films and characters. In September, the director said the film would not be connected to any previous DCEU films as he was uncertain if it was going to be released before or after The Flash, which was intended to reboot the DCEU. He explained that he had directed a relatively small amount of additional photography, which he described as a routine part of the production process, due to some actors being unavailable during some parts of principal photography. Lundgren later said that the studio decided to reshoot much of the footage to rebuild it with a slightly different storyline, reducing his and Heard's roles. In October 2023, the film's release was delayed by two days to December 22, 2023. The following month, Warner Bros. signed a new multi-year co-financing deal with Domain Capital for their theatrical films, including The Lost Kingdom, through that company's $700 million fund for media and entertainment, Domain Entertainment. Kirk Morri returned as the editor from the first film, and Nick Davis served as the visual effects supervisor, having previously worked on The Dark Knight (2008). Nearly each frame in the film featured visual effects, which were provided by Cinesite, DNEG, Industrial Light & Magic (ILM), Moving Picture Company (MPC), Scanline VFX, and Rodeo FX.

== Music ==
Rupert Gregson-Williams revealed in August 2021 that he was returning to compose the score for the sequel after doing so for the first film and DC's Wonder Woman (2017). The song "Deep End" was performed by X Ambassadors and released as a single on November 17, 2023. The soundtrack album for Gregson-Williams' score was released by WaterTower Music on December 22.

== Marketing ==
Promotional video with Momoa and Wilson released in February 2024, via Max's YouTube channel

Wan and Wilson teased plans for the film in a panel at the virtual DC FanDome event in August 2020. Concept art and behind-the-scenes footage from filming were revealed at DC FanDome the following year. In February 2022, the first footage from the film was released as part of a teaser for Warner Bros.'s 2022 slate of DC films, which also included The Batman, Black Adam, and The Flash (before Aquaman and the Lost Kingdom and The Flash were delayed to 2023 the following month). Wan promoted the film at Warner Bros.'s CinemaCon panel in April 2022, showing a recorded message of Momoa as well as some brief footage from the film. He revealed more concept art for the film when its release date was delayed in August.

The first trailer was showcased during Warner Bros.'s CinemaCon panel in April 2023, showing the "bromance" between Arthur and Orm among other footage. Steve Weintraub at Collider said the footage looked "absolutely massive in scale" and featured several action sequences. The first theatrical trailer was released on September 14, 2023. The cast was not able to participate in marketing during the 2023 SAG-AFTRA strike, until the strike ended in November. IWC Schaffhausen, in collaboration with Warner Bros. Pictures, released an Aquatimer Perpetual Calendar Digital Date-Month diving watch, inspired by the watches worn by Abdul-Mateen II and Park in the film.

== Release ==
=== Theatrical ===
Aquaman and the Lost Kingdom premiered on December 19, 2023, at a fan event screening at the Grove at Farmers Market in Los Angeles. This was noted by Borys Kit of The Hollywood Reporter for not having a red carpet event and after-party, with Wan and Momoa attending after a series of blue carpet photo calls and small-scale fan events in London, Beijing, and Los Angeles. The film was released in China on December 20, and in the United States on December 22, in IMAX, 3D, 4DX, and ScreenX, among other premium large formats (PLFs). It was originally set for release on December 16, 2022, but was moved to March 17, 2023, when Warner Bros. adjusted its release schedule due to the COVID-19 pandemic's impact on the workload of visual effects vendors. It was then moved to December 25, 2023, when Warner Bros. Discovery was trying to spread out marketing and distribution costs, before moving forward to December 20, and ultimately being pushed back by two days to December 22.

=== Home media ===
Aquaman and the Lost Kingdom was released by Warner Bros. Home Entertainment on digital download on January 23, 2024, on the Warner Bros. streaming service Max on February 27, and on Ultra HD Blu-ray, Blu-ray, and DVD on March 12. It includes behind-the-scenes featurettes, as well as the special feature "Atlantean Blood is Thicker Than Water", which explores Aquaman and Orm's dynamic on both Blu-ray versions and the original motion comic Aquaman: Through Fire and Water on premium digital versions. According to Nielsen Media Research, which measures the viewership of media on streaming services, The Lost Kingdom was the most-watched film on streaming upon its debut for the week of February 26 – March 3, 2024, with a total of 685 million minutes watched.

== Reception ==
=== Box office ===
Aquaman and the Lost Kingdom grossed $124.5 million in the United States and Canada, and $315.7 million in other territories, for a worldwide total of $440.18 million. It became the highest-grossing DCEU film since the first Aquaman film, but it grossed less than half of that film's box office revenue. Some commentators deemed that the film "floundered" at the box office, with Aidan Kelly of Collider estimating that it needed to earn $305–355 million worldwide to reach its break-even point, while /Film's Hannah Shaw-Williams thought it was unlikely that the film would break even during its theatrical run, even after surpassing a worldwide gross of $400 million. Jill Goldsmith at Deadline Hollywood noted that the revenue of Warner Bros.'s theatrical films released in the fourth quarter were higher on most releases, including The Lost Kingdom, although this was lower than box office analysts had predicted despite lowered projections.

In the United States and Canada, Aquaman and the Lost Kingdom was released alongside Migration, Anyone but You, and The Iron Claw, and was projected to gross around $40 million in its four-day opening weekend. The film earned $13.7 million on its first day, including $4.5 million from Thursday night previews. It went on to have a traditional opening weekend of $27.7 million, the fourth-lowest of the DCEU, and the second-lowest among those films unaffected by the COVID-19 pandemic. It then made $10.6 million on Christmas Day, for a four-day total of $38.3 million. In its second weekend, the film made $19.5 million, a drop of 30%, finishing in third behind Wonka and Migration. In its third weekend, the film made $10.6 million, a drop of 42%, remaining in third. In its fourth weekend, the film made $5.3 million, a drop of 50%, finishing in sixth.

=== Critical response ===
The film received negative reviews from critics. The review aggregator website Rotten Tomatoes calculated that 33% of 212 critic reviews were positive and the average rating was 4.9/10. The website's critical consensus reads, "Jason Momoa remains a capable and committed leading man, but even DC diehards may feel that Aquaman and the Lost Kingdom sticks to familiar waters." Metacritic assigned the film a weighted average score of 42 out of 100 based on 43 critics, indicating "mixed or average" reviews. Audiences polled by CinemaScore gave the film an average grade of "B" on an A+ to F scale, tied with Batman v Superman: Dawn of Justice and The Flash for the lowest of the DCEU, while PostTrak reported 69% of filmgoers gave it a positive score, with 50% saying they would definitely recommend the film.

The chemistry between Momoa and Wilson was noted by critics as one of the film's high marks. Matt Zoller Seitz of RogerEbert.com noted Jason Momoa as the high mark of the film: "Momoa is the best reason to see the movie. He's as alpha-cool, even jerk-ish, as a "maverick" action star can be while also making you believe his character is fundamentally decent and knows when he's gone too far and sincerely feels bad about it. And he's got range". Seitz gave the movie three out of four stars. Both Peter Bradshaw of The Guardian and The Independent's Clarisse Loughrey provided a one-star rating for the film. Bradshaw compared the humor to Taika Waititi's Marvel films Thor: Ragnarok (2017) and Thor: Love and Thunder (2022) and felt Aquaman's role as a father was a derivative trope "used as a tired relatability short-cut by Hollywood". He also lamented Randall Park's role in the film, feeling it was "entirely wasted", and expressed ambivalent feelings about the cast performances. Meanwhile, Loughrey labeled the film as an "entry in the rogues' gallery of brainless franchise films", opining that Wan might have incorporated elements from his planned project The Trench into the project. She was surprised the film's theme was about climate change and thought Mera's role was "faux-feminist" and narratively contrived, noting Amber Heard's legal controversies. Furthermore, she also called the set pieces "derivative" and thought the humor negatively impacted the film's emotional moments.

Giving a two-star review, writer Nicholas Barber of the BBC began by expressing his view that Aquaman's box office revenue was the primary reason for this film's existence. However, he praised the performances of Wilson and Abdul-Mateen II while noting that Momoa seems to have been miscast as "[h]e's too earthy to be the king of the sea." Barber also called the relationship between Arthur and Orm "clichéd," lamented at the complete waste of Kidman's talent, and opined that while most of Heard's scenes had been edited out, the film's "unrelated plot" was such that her absence did not matter much. Ultimately, he concluded that the film never "attempts anything original or honest" and criticized its "brutal" editing for "rush[ing] through every potentially major event in a blur of montages and voiceovers". David Fear of Rolling Stone felt it functioned as a standalone film and was separate from the DCEU, but disliked the tone and visual effects. Fear also called the storytelling "curiously thin" and was mixed on its commentary regarding climate change, but appreciated Momoa's performance and thought the film adequately concluded the DCEU. CNN Entertainment's Brian Lowry negatively compared it to Wonder Woman 1984 (2020) and felt the lack of a new antagonist was to its detriment, calling David Kane a "one-note villain". He enjoyed Momoa's performance and thought it contributed to the film's "fun", but also was not interested in Arthur and Orm's relationship as it "wades through too many clunky moments to reach the few good ones". Writing for the Associated Press, Mark Kennedy thought the film's plot to be derivative from other films—such as The Matrix (1999), Pirates of the Caribbean, and Star Wars—and disliked references to other films. Nevertheless, Kennedy considered Momoa's performance to be "holding it all together," and summed up the film as attempting to raise the stakes by increasing the production budget.

Wan's direction was commended by Alissa Wilkinson at The New York Times and Phil Owen of GameSpot, with Wilkinson crediting him with creating a film "beyond the paint-by-numbers superhero movies we've been watching for decades now". Wilkinson also enjoyed the political commentary, as she felt certain elements were metaphors for authoritarianism and fascism. She primarily enjoyed Wilson's performance and Orm's character development compared to Aquaman, but felt certain plot elements and the humor became repetitive and boring. Owen commended the production values but felt it lacked "substance" and was "empty-headed", giving the film an 8 out of 10. The A.V. Club's Matthew Jackson gave it a B grade, enthusiastically enjoying the film's depiction of Orm and Arthur's relationship, calling that "formula ... absolute gold, both on a set piece and a character level". Jackson opined that the narrative contained too much and disliked the plotting, but he still felt it could effectively tell a cohesive narrative and enjoyed his overall viewing experience. Jackson concluded: "And above all else, Aquaman And The Lost Kingdom is fun. It does not dwell on its status as a finale for a certain comic book movie era, nor does it worry over the possibility that we'll never see Momoa's Arthur Curry again. Instead, this is a film that takes big swing after big swing, and leaves us filled up with spectacle, warmth, and a sense that the wait was probably worth it."

Michael Ordoña of the Los Angeles Times felt it highlighted climate change in an "earnest if clumsy fashion" and expressed minor complaints with the absence of physics during CGI-based action sequences underwater. Ordoña enjoyed the film's "buddy cop movie" tone and noted how it focused on portraying Arthur interacting with his family rather than Mera. He commended the characterization of Arthur and Orm, complimenting the former as the "most alive character in the DCEU", and enjoyed the short runtime. Meanwhile, Bob Strauss from the San Francisco Chronicle considered it to be a decent conclusion for the DCEU, and added that the story and runtime had been concise and efficient, agreeing with Ordoña's sentiments. He mostly enjoyed the film's design and visual effects, but felt it was similar to Zack Snyder's then-released film Rebel Moon (2023). He found the acting effective at conveying the sensation of being underwater and at highlighting Arthur and Orm's relationship, but disliked the exposition delivery.

=== Accolades ===
At the 49th People's Choice Awards, Momoa was nominated for the Action Movie Star of the Year. The film was nominated for Outstanding Animated Character in a Photoreal Feature at the 22nd Visual Effects Society Awards for the character T.O.P.O. the Octopus. At the 2024 Kids' Choice Awards, the film was nominated for Favorite Movie and Momoa was nominated for Favorite Movie Actor.

== Future ==
By December 2022, Warner Bros. was considering ending the Aquaman film series and recasting Momoa as the character Lobo following Aquaman and the Lost Kingdom; Momoa had long been a fan of Lobo. In January 2023, Momoa said that while he would "always be Aquaman", he felt he could also portray other characters. Gunn and Safran said Momoa could play Aquaman in the DCU, but a decision on the role had not been made. Because no actor would play multiple characters, Momoa would not portray Aquaman in the DCU if he was instead cast as Lobo. Safran wanted to continue working with Momoa as Aquaman or in another role, and explained that they set a high bar for casting, while feeling Momoa was perfect as Aquaman. In September 2023, Wan said The Lost Kingdom set up a sequel, which he expressed interest in directing after a long break. Gunn had said The Lost Kingdom and The Flash would lead into the first DCU film Superman (2025), but later clarified that no DC media released before the DCU began in 2024 would be canon to that franchise, leading some commentators to question the possibility of a potential continuation moving forward.

By October 2023, no actors from director Zack Snyder's DCEU films were expected to reprise their roles in the DCU, including Momoa as Aquaman. However, Momoa had been in talks to portray Lobo in either Superman or a standalone film. Ahead of The Lost Kingdom's release in December 2023, Momoa cast doubt on reprising his role as Aquaman because a sequel depended on the film's reception. He had several ideas for continuing the role, such as having a younger character like Aquaman's son Arthur Jr. be featured in a sequel, but said that he would not be replaced with a different actor as Aquaman. Safran said Momoa would "always have a home at DC" and they would figure out his continued involvement following The Lost Kingdom, and a year later, Momoa was confirmed to be portraying Lobo in the DCU, starting with the film Supergirl (2026).

== See also ==
- List of underwater science fiction works
