= Nyrðra-Vatnalautavatn =

Lake in Iceland

- Location within Iceland
- Location: Ófeigsfjarðarheiði
- Coordinates: 66.0295°N 21.8906°W
- Basin countries: Iceland

Nyrðra-Vatnalautavatn (Icelandic pronunciation: [ˈnɪrðra-ˈvahtnaˌlœyːtaˌvahtn̥]) is the largest body of water on Ófeigsfjarðarheiði in Iceland. It is located in the Árneshreppur district in the Westfjords.

The lake is mostly famous for its idiosyncratic name.
