= Sukkertoppen =

Sukkertoppen means "the Sugar Loaf" in Danish and Norwegian. It may refer to:

- Maniitsoq, formerly Sukkertoppen or Nye-Sukkertoppen, a town in mid-western Greenland.
- Kangaamiut, Greenland, the original site of Sukkertoppen before it was moved to the location of present-day Maniitsoq in 1782
- Kirkjufell, a mountain west of Grundarfjörður in Iceland.
- Sukkertoppen, a mountain in Ålesund Municipality, Norway.
