= M. Davidsen (ship) =

M. Davidsen was the name of a passenger ship in Iceland which began operations in 1891. It was assessed at 217 gross register tonnage and measured 35.25 m (115.6 ft) long by 6.21 m (20.4 ft) wide by 4.86 m (16.0 ft) deep. It had room for 14 passengers. The ship was purchased from Denmark for 225,000 Icelandic króna in 1919 and used to move people and goods between Reykjavík and locations in Faxa Bay and Breiðafjörður. After its purchase it was renamed to Suðurland in 1919.

Suðurland is now a derelict hulk near the abandoned herring factory at Djúpavík, Iceland. It was docked there in 1935 to serve as living quarters for men who worked in the factory.

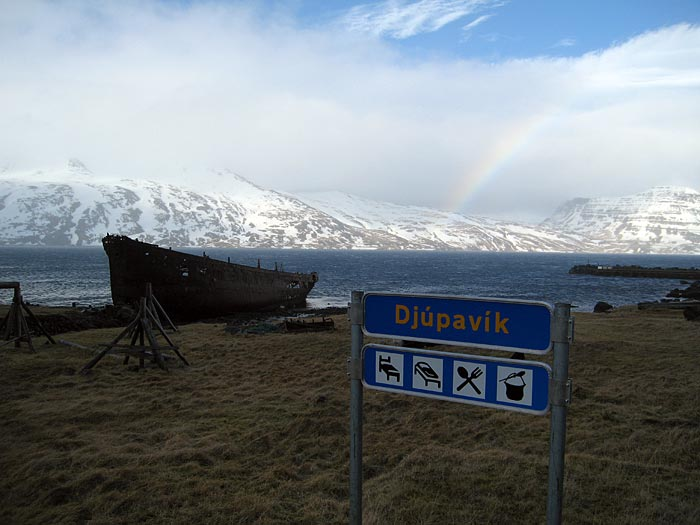
Djúpavík village sign, wreck of the Suðurland freight ship
