= Breiðafjörður =

Large shallow bay in Iceland

Coordinates: 65°15′N 23°15′W

Main bays and fjords of Iceland. Breiðafjörður and Faxaflói are the largest bays.

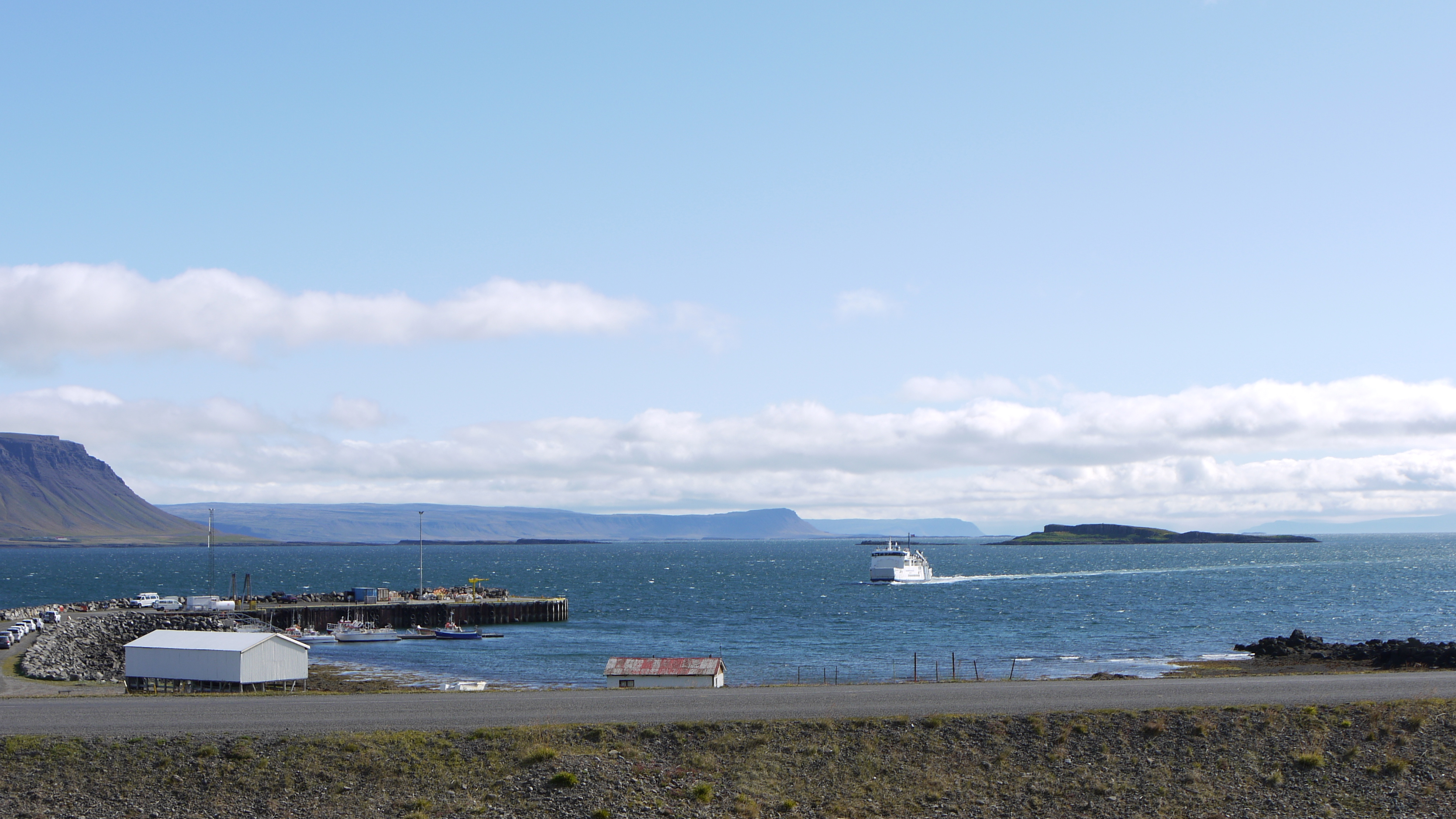
Breiðafjörður from Brjánslækur as the ferry Baldur arrives.

Breiðafjörður (Icelandic: [ˈpreiːðaˌfjœrðʏr̥], lit. wide fjord) is a large shallow bay of the Irminger Sea, about 50 km (31 mi) wide and 125 km (78 mi) long, to the west of Iceland. It separates the region of the Westfjords (Vestfirðir) from the Snæfellsnes peninsula to the south. Breiðafjörður is encircled by mountains, including Kirkjufell and the glacier Snæfellsjökull on the Snæfellsnes peninsula, and the Látrabjarg bird cliffs at the tip of the Westfjords. Numerous smaller fjords extend inland from Breiðafjörður, the largest being Hvammsfjörður at its southeastern corner. An interesting feature of the bay is that the land to the north was formed about 15 million years ago, whereas the land to the south was formed less than half that time ago.. Breiðafjörður therefore was formed by tectonic movements, and all the islands and skerries were made by volcanic eruptions to form ridges and craters that mostly line up in an east-west position.

== Nature ==
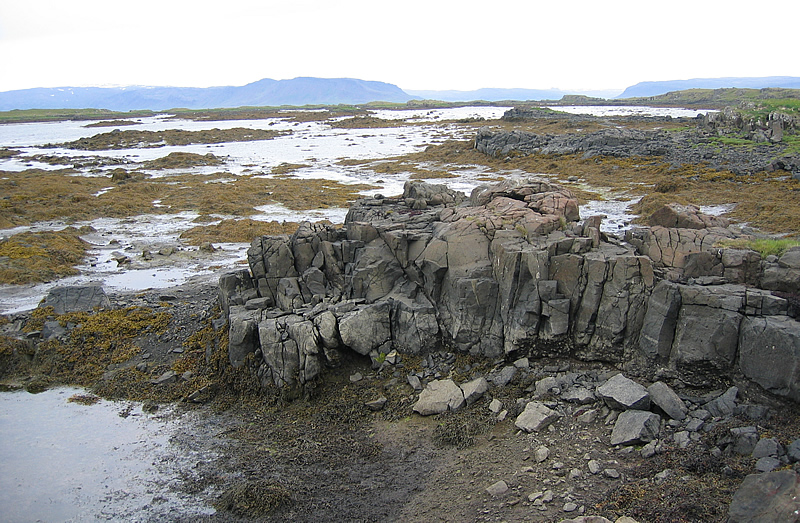
Intertidal zone in Skáleyjar islands at Breiðafjörður

Breiðafjörður has a land and seascape consisting of shallow seas, small fjords and bays, and intertidal areas, dotted with about 3,000 islands, islets and skerries. The area contains about half of Iceland's intertidal area and tides can be 6 m (20 ft). The bedrock was formed during rift volcanism in the late Tertiary period. The area consists mainly of basaltic lava that was deeply eroded by glaciers during the quaternary age, creating a diverse landscape. There are several geothermal sites, some visible only at low tide.

== Plants and Animals ==
The large intertidal zone is high in biodiversity and productivity and has extensive algal forests and other important habitats for fish and invertebrates. By far the most dominant species is Ascophyllum nodosum seaweed. The land-area supports 230 species of vascular plants and around 50 breeding bird species including the common shag, glaucous gull, white-tailed eagle, common eider, black guillemot and grey phalarope. The area is important staging area for brent goose and red knot. The common seal and the grey seal have their main haul-out on the islands and skerries.

Several species of cetaceans are commonly found including the common porpoise, white-beaked dolphin, killer whale and minke whale, but also sharks.

== Islands ==
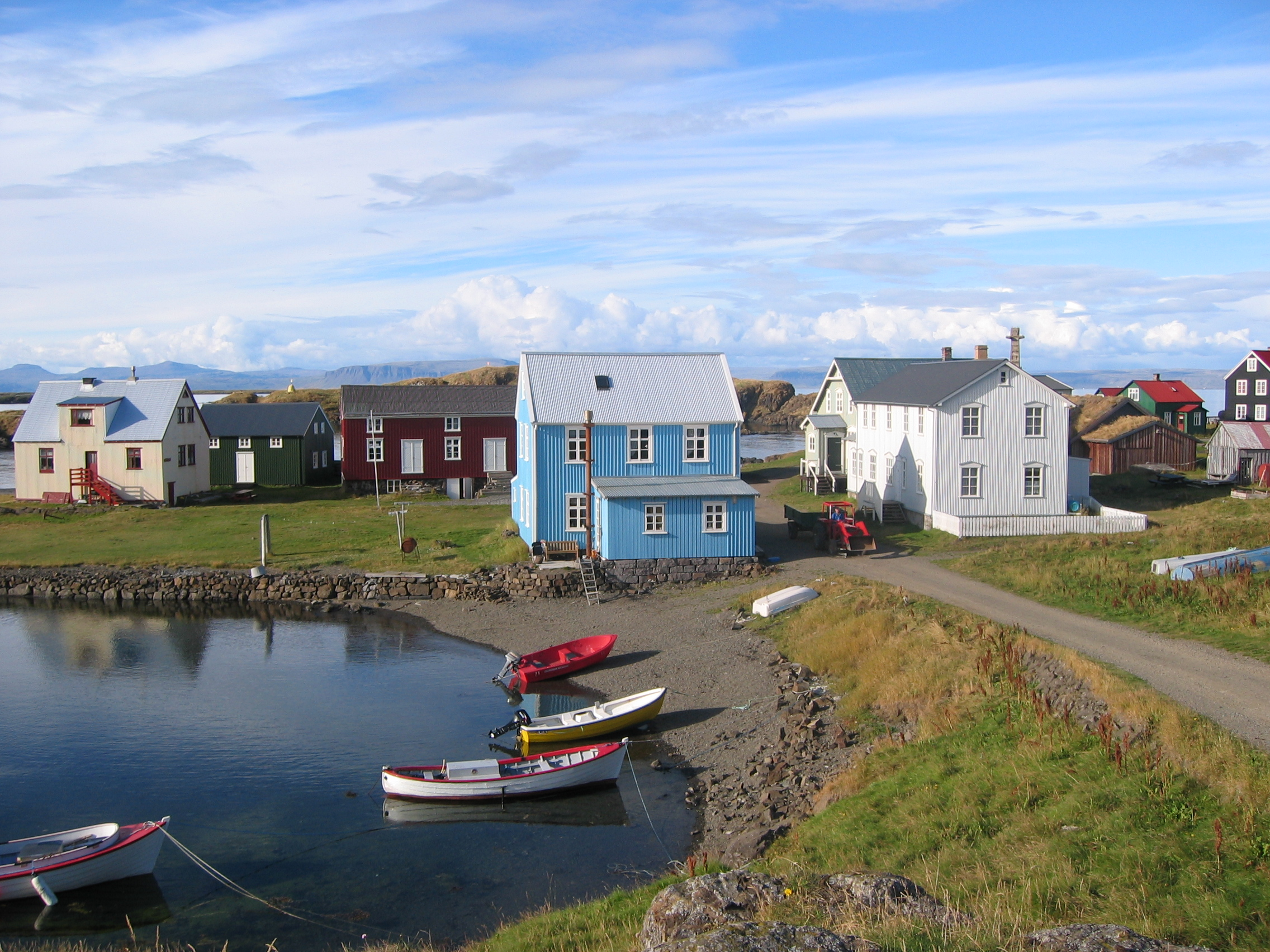
Flatey in Breiðafjörður

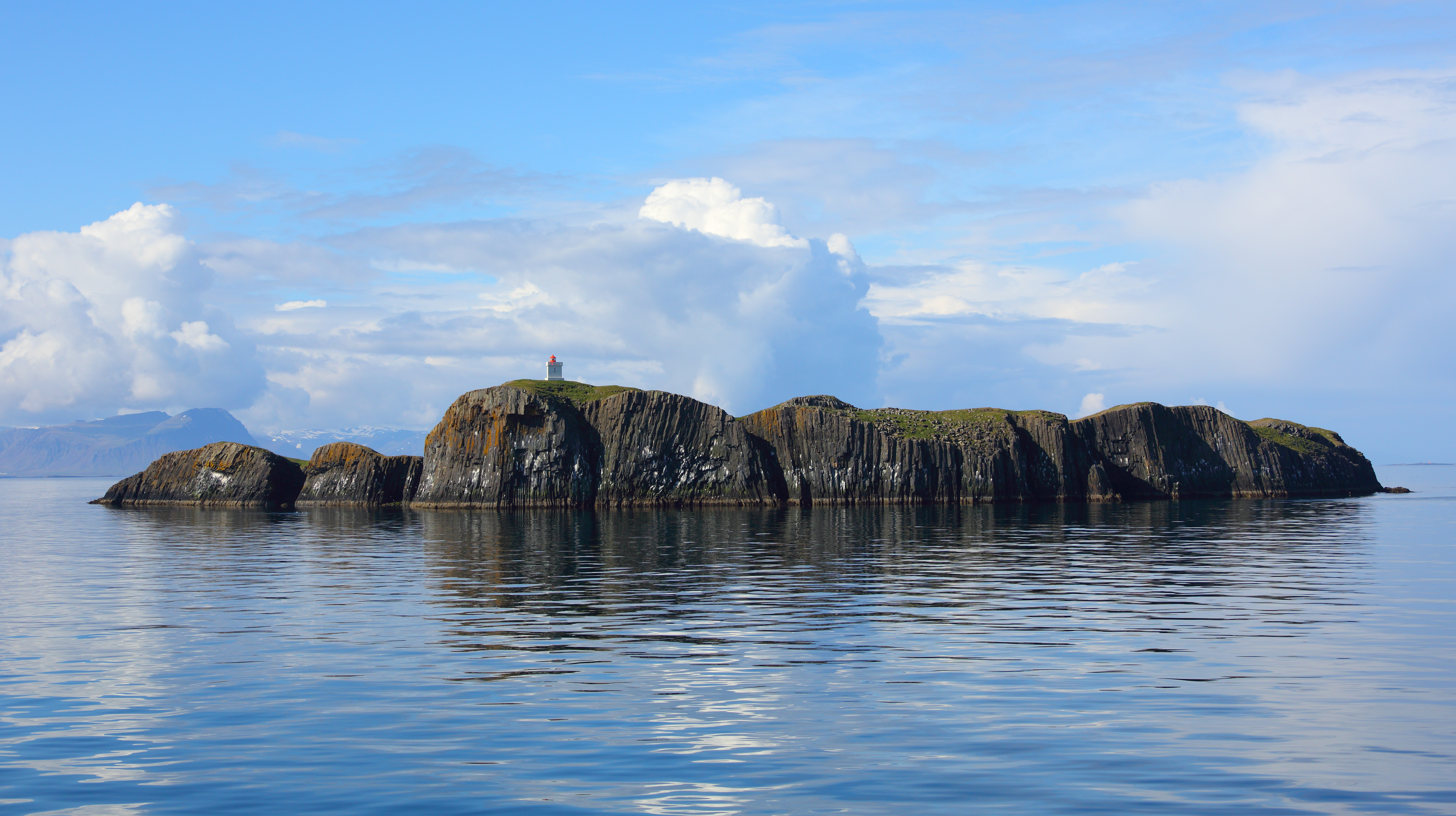
The island Elliðaey in Breiðafjörður

The islands in Breiðafjörður have an unbroken history of human use, but now only Flatey is inhabited year-round. Many islands are used for summer residences and for harvesting of natural resources such as eiderdown. Landowners decide whether to allow the harvest of Ascophyllum at their shores. Some of the islands include:

- Brokey
- Elliðaey
- Flatey
- Hergilsey
- Hvallátur
- Skáleyjar
- Svefneyjar
- Sviðnur

== Economy and ecology ==
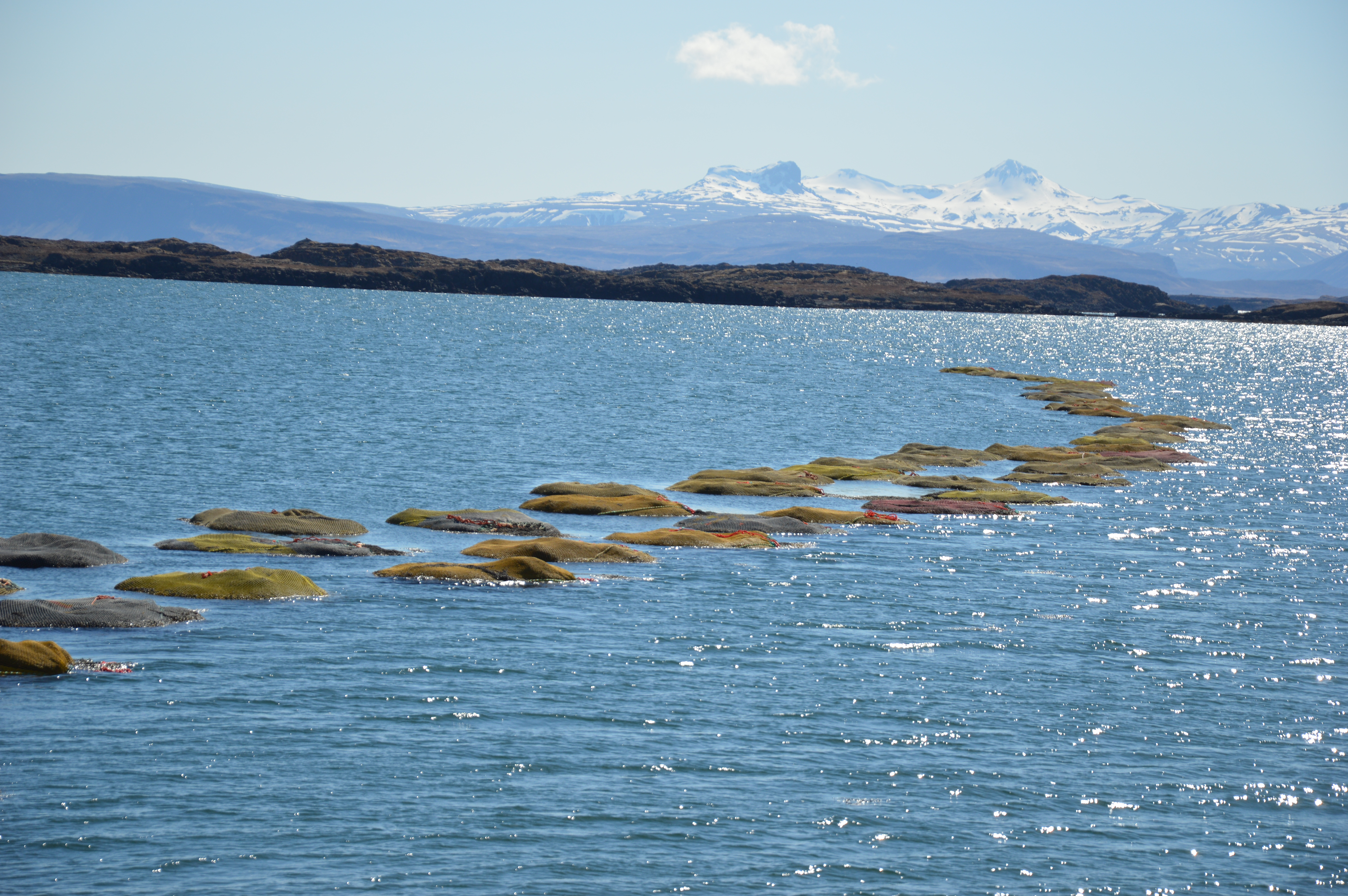
Thorverk dries seaweed with geothermal heat

Seaweed harvest, fisheries, tourism and algal harvesting are other major uses of the area. The largest seaweed harvester in Iceland, with a history of sustainable harvesting for about 50 years, is Thorverk. Thorverk was first established in 1976 by the local farmers and the Icelandic state. During its history Ascophyllum has only been harvested at the same spot every 4 or 5 years. The Icelandic Marine Research Institute monitors the resource and allows a catch quota. All harvest is registered at the Fisheries directory. Just South of Reykhólar, on a small island offshore, is also Norður & Co. manufactures sea salt obtained by evaporation of seawater, using geothermal energy. The process was first used in this region in 1753 and was chosen by Soren Røsenkilde when he established Norður in 2012.

Breiðafjörður is the spawning ground for some of Iceland's most important economic fish species and a variety of invertebrates.

== Transport ==
From the small port of Stykkishólmur on the Snæfellsnes peninsula, a ferry crosses Breiðafjörður to Brjánslækur in the Westfjords, stopping at the island of Flatey on the way. It is also possible to circle around Breiðafjörður overland, by car. If the weather is fine, it is possible to see the coastline of the Westfjords from the Snæfellsnes peninsula, at a distance of up to 40 km (25 mi).

== Culture and history ==
Among the earliest known settlers of Breiðafjörður was Aud the Deep-Minded, who brought many of her followers to the area in the 9th Century following the death of her husband, Olaf the White, King of Dublin, and her son, Thorstein the Red. Aud took over leadership of Thorstein's dependents, not unusual in Viking Age Norse society, but she could not lead military campaigns, which may have influenced her decision to resettle her followers to Iceland. Upon arrival, Aud reportedly threw her high-seat pillars (Öndvegissúlur) into the sea and they came ashore at Hvamm, and she claimed several hundred square kilometers around Breiðafjörður.

Geirmund Hjørson Heljarskinn held a kingdom in these lands in the 10th Century AD.

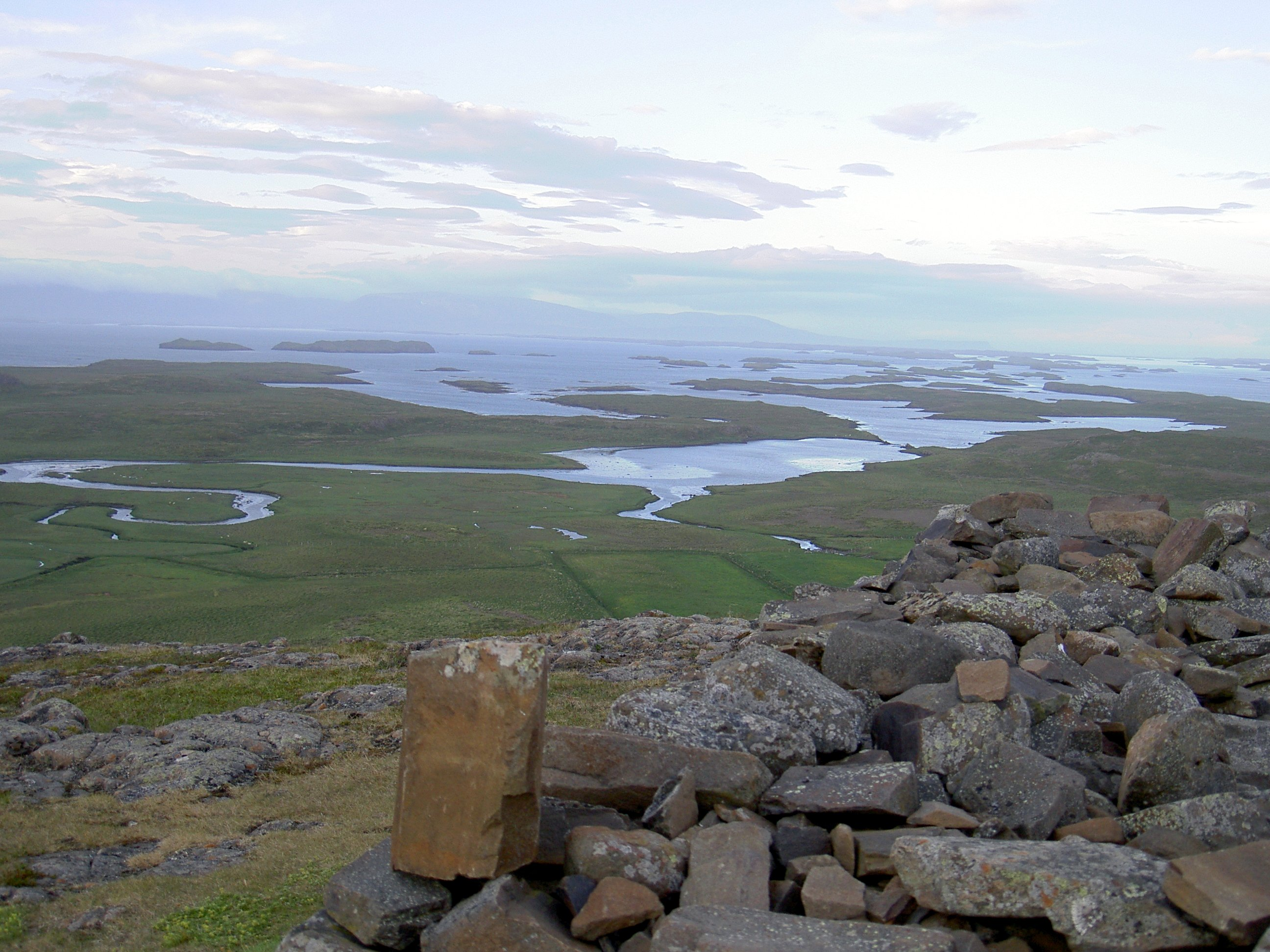
Hvammsfjörður, an arm or foot! of Breiðafjörður

During the Middle Ages, especially in the 12th century, there was a monastery of Augustine monks on the island of Flatey, which formed an important centre of Icelandic culture. The most extensive local medieval manuscript, the Flateyjarbók was written there. Afterwards, the island was an important trading post and also home to a printing press.
