= María Guðmundsdóttir (filmmaker) =

Icelandic model (born 1942)

- Born: 12 February 1942 (age 83); Reykjavík, Iceland
- Occupation(s): Filmmaker, photographer, model
- Years active: 1961–present

María Guðmundsdóttir (born 12 February 1942) is an Icelandic filmmaker, photographer and model. She is a former supermodel and Miss Iceland in 1961.

== Biography ==
María was born in Reykjavík and grew up in Djúpavík until the age of 11. She was crowned Miss Iceland in 1961. By 1967, she was modeling for Eileen Ford in New York.

In 2015 she produced and directed the documentary Ferðin heim - smásögur úr Árneshreppi á Ströndum, about the people of Árneshreppur, the municipality where she grew up.
