= Steinunn Thorarinsdottir =

Icelandic sculptor

- Steinunn Þórarinsdóttir
- Born: April 20, 1955 (age 71)
- Education: University of Portsmouth, England (1974–79); Accademia di Belle Arti di Bologna, Italy (1979–80)
- Awards: Order of the Falcon; 2009
- Website: steinunnth.com

Steinunn Þórarinsdóttir (transliterated as Thorarinsdottir; born April 20, 1955) is an Icelandic sculptor. Her work uses androgynous human figures such as those in her most notable exhibits Borders and Horizons.

== Biography ==
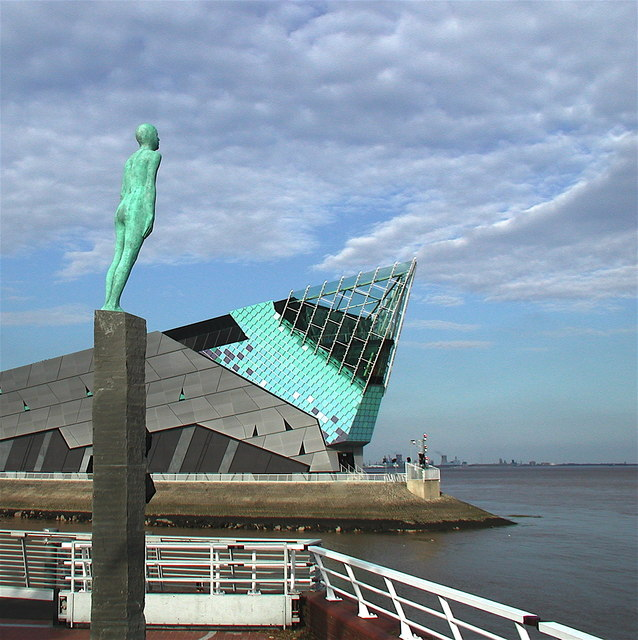
"Voyage", by Steinunn Thorarinsdottir, in Kingston upon Hull.

Steinunn lives and works in Reykjavik, Iceland. She married Jon Arsæll and has two sons. Steinunn studied art in England at the University of Portsmouth Fine Art Department and in Bologna, Italy at the Accademia di Belle Arte. Her teachers included British sculptor Darrell Viner.

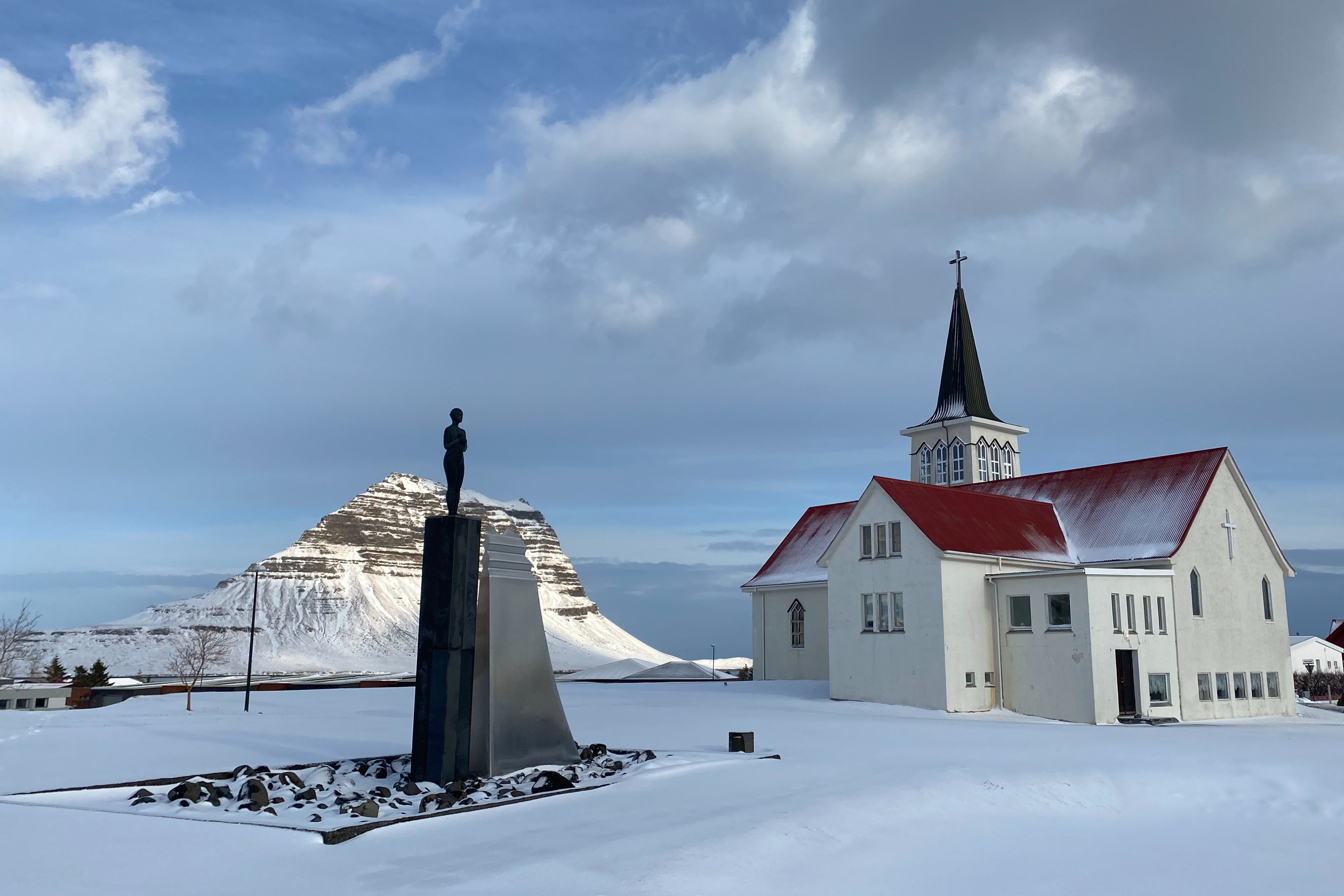
"Sýn", by Steinunn Thorarinsdóttir, in Grundarfjörður, Iceland

Steinunn is a member of the Reykjavik Association of Sculptors where she served as president from 1985 to 1987. In 2009 she was awarded the Order of the Falcon by the President of Iceland for her contribution to the Icelandic and international art communities.

== Exhibits ==
=== Horizons ===
This exhibit of 12 life-size androgynous figures has made appearances at the Georgia Museum of Art, Knoxville Museum of Art as well as locations in Alabama, New York, Tennessee, Texas, and Illinois beginning in 2007. The figures, each in a unique pose, are made of cast iron and are cohesive as a collection by the band of polished glass around their chests.

Steinunn explained the significance of her choice in materials: “The color of the iron signifies their primal quality—as if they are emerging from the earth” while “Glass as a material has a lot of different connotations. It can be fragile, yet dangerous. It can be translucent, or solid. . . It's like water, but also like air.”

The exhibit was showcased in the documentary Horizons: The Art of Steinunn Þórarinsdóttir directed by Frank Cantor and featuring music by Björk. The film, exploring the human condition through Steinunn's work, was awarded a Cine Golden Eagle, Special Jury and Masters Award from the International Cine Festival in Washington, D.C. in 2009.

=== Borders ===
This 26 piece exhibit was originally sculpted for exhibition in Dag Hammarskjöld Plaza outside the United Nations Headquarters in New York City in 2011. The androgynous figures are divided into 13 pairs which mirror each other. Each pair includes a cast iron and an aluminum figure. After their time in NYC, Borders traveled to Dallas, Seattle, Chicago, and was on display at Valparaiso University in Northwest Indiana from 2014-2016. Borders is currently displayed at Pyramid Hill Sculpture Park in Hamilton, Ohio.

Steinunn posed her kneeling, standing, and sitting pairs in politically and socially charged areas purposefully The exhibit also calls back to Steinunn's family since she used her eighteen-year-old son as a model.

Brauer Museum of Art Director/Curator, Gregg Hertzlieb described the exhibit's social commentary on unity and diversity: "The figures observe invisible borders that keep them forever separated, and yet the similarities between the pairs, and among all the figures, acknowledge a shared nature that attracts and transfixes them. Viewers experiencing the silent dialogue between the paired iron and aluminum figures realize that, while difference may initially gain attention, what sustains this symbolic and eternal exchange is empathy and respect."

=== Encounters with Iceland ===
After a trip to Iceland in 2013, Mission Hill Family Estate winery proprietor Anthony von Mandl decided to bring an exhibit of Steinunn's work to the estate in Okanagan Valley, Canada. The exhibit includes more than 40 of Steinunn's life-size sculptures in cast iron and aluminum. Some are in mirrored pairs like those of Borders while others are single figures. The exhibit stayed at the winery June–December 2014.

== Commissions ==
=== 'Waves' ===
In 2010, Steinunn unveiled her sculpture 'Waves' commissioned by The University of Aberdeen, Scotland. The sculpture consists of two cast aluminum curved towers with one human figure at the base of one and another human figure on top of the other. The nine meter tall sculpture sits outside the Aberdeen Sports Village. Steinunn said, "The sculpture ‘Waves’ is inspired by the special character of Aberdeen with its open seas and unique colour as well as the shape of the Aberdeen Sports Village building. The work expresses dynamic movement, progress and a journey of discovery.”

=== 'Voyages' ===
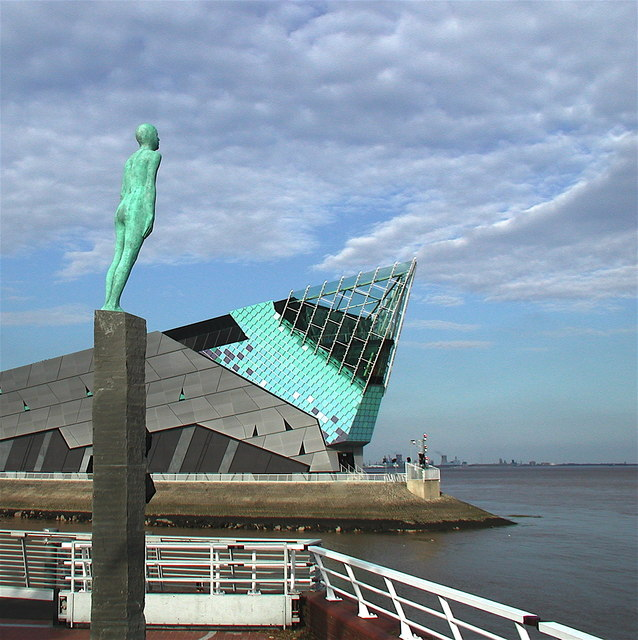
'Voyages' in the City of Hull, England.

'Voyages' is Steinunn's two part sculpture that was commissioned by the British and Icelandic governments. The sister statues gaze out over the waters between Hull, England and Vik, Iceland. The two fishing towns have a long history of trade relations spanning over 1000 years which was colored by the Cod War in the 1950s and 1970s. The statues symbolize the reestablishment of friendship between the two towns. Poets Angela Leighton, Carol Rumens, Cliff Forshaw, and David Wheatley composed poems in honor of the unveiling of the sculptures.

The statue in Hull was stolen in July 2011 presumably by scrap metal thieves. Insurance money was able to cover the cost of replacing the statue

== Sculptures ==
Title	Material	Size	Date Completed	Current Location
Balance	Cast Iron	28 x 43 inches (71 x 109 cm)		
Being There	Cast Iron	53 x 0 inches (135 x 0 cm)		
Connection	Anodized Aluminum	39 x 158 inches (99 x 401 cm)		
Crusaders	Cast Iron and Glass	64.06 in (163 cm)	1999	Osborne Samuel Gallery
Dawn	Cast Iron and Glass	70 x 0 inches (178 x 0 cm)		
Days (Installation of 5 figures)	Cast iron and glass		2008	Kathryn Hall Wineyards, California, USA.
Earth	Cast Iron	43.23 x 39.30 inches	2001	Osborne Samuel Gallery
Flux	Cast Iron and Glass	72 x 0 inches (183 x 0 cm)		
Illumination	Cast Iron and Glass	69 inches (176 cm)	2003	Private Collection
Islands	Aluminium & Cast iron		2003	Osborne Samuel Gallery
Loosening	Aluminum	Size	2000	
Mirror II	Aluminum	28 x 11 x 6 inches (73 x 28 x 16 cm)	2017	Private Collection, Denmark
Moment	Anodized Aluminum	51 x 19 inches (130 x 48 cm)		Odon Wagner Contemporary Gallery
Momentum	Aluminum	14 x 20 inches (36 x 51 cm)		
Morning I	Bronze	11 x 0 inches (28 x 0 cm)		
Morning II	Bronze	15 x 0 inches (38 x 0 cm)		
Place	Aluminum	53 x 16 inches (135 x 41 cm)		Odon Wagner Contemporary Gallery 1/7
Poem	Cast Iron and Glass	14 x 39 inches (36 x 99 cm)		
Position I	Aluminum	16 x 12 inches (41 x 30 cm)		Odon Wagner Contemporary Gallery 2/7
Position II	Aluminum and Mirrored Steel	30 x 18 inches (76 x 46 cm)		Odon Wagner Contemporary Gallery
Situation II	Aluminum and Mirrored Steel	16 x 0 inches (41 x 0 cm)		
Sýn	Stainless Steel	576 x 60 cm	1989	Grundarfjörður, Iceland
Tide II	Anodized Aluminum	71 x 0 inches (180 x 0 cm)		
Tabula	Aluminum and stainless steel	225 x 200 x 300 cm	2010	Liechtenstein.
Vision I	Aluminium And Mirror Steel	16 x 11 inches (41 x 28 cm)		Odon Wagner Contemporary Gallery, Ed. 3
Vision II	Cast Iron and Glass	16 x 16 inches (41 x 41 cm)		
