= Grundarfjörður =

Grundarfjarðarbær
- Municipality
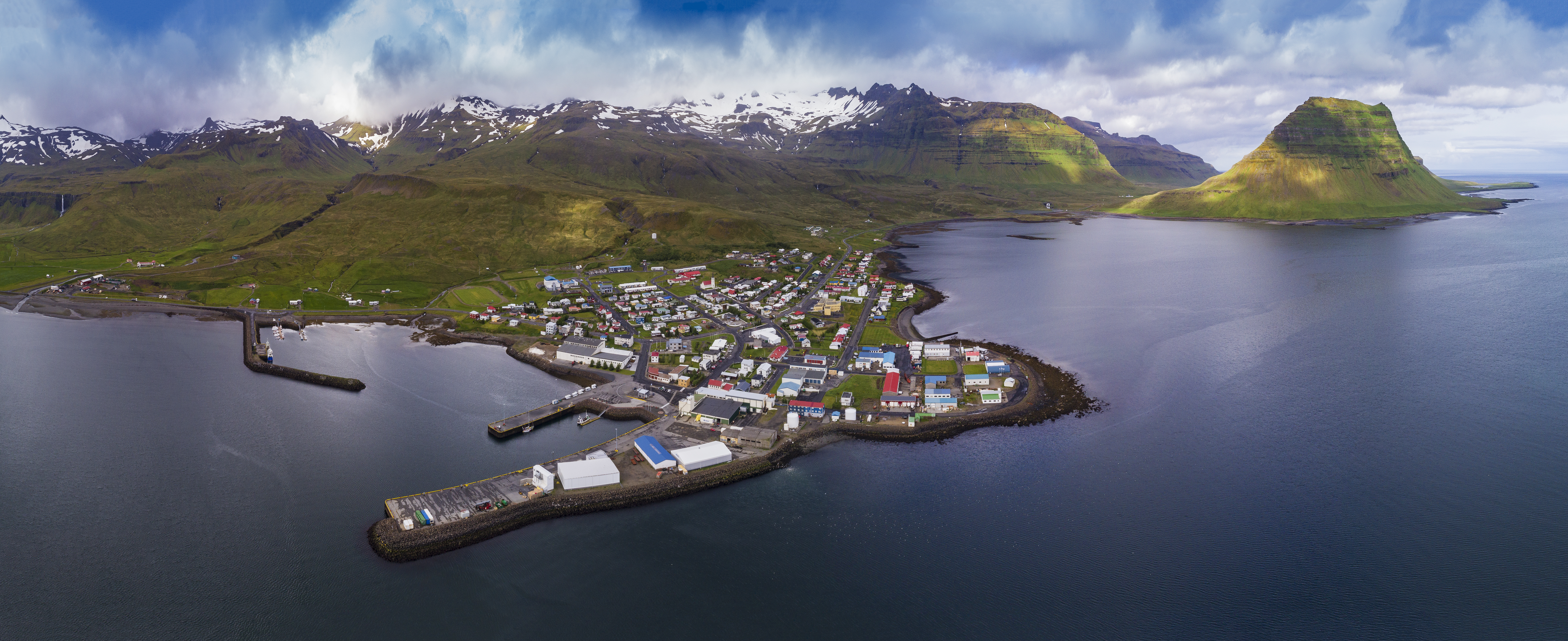
- Skyline of Grundarfjarðarbær

- Location of Grundarfjarðarbær

- Location within Iceland
- Coordinates: 64°56′N 23°16′W
- Country: Iceland
- Region: Western Region
- Constituency: Northwest Constituency

Government
  - Mayor: Björg Ágústdóttir

Area
  - Total: 148 km^{2} (57 sq mi)

Population
  - Total: 872
  - Density: 5.89/km^{2} (15.3/sq mi)
- Postal code(s): 350
- Municipal number: 3709
- Website: grundarfjordur.is

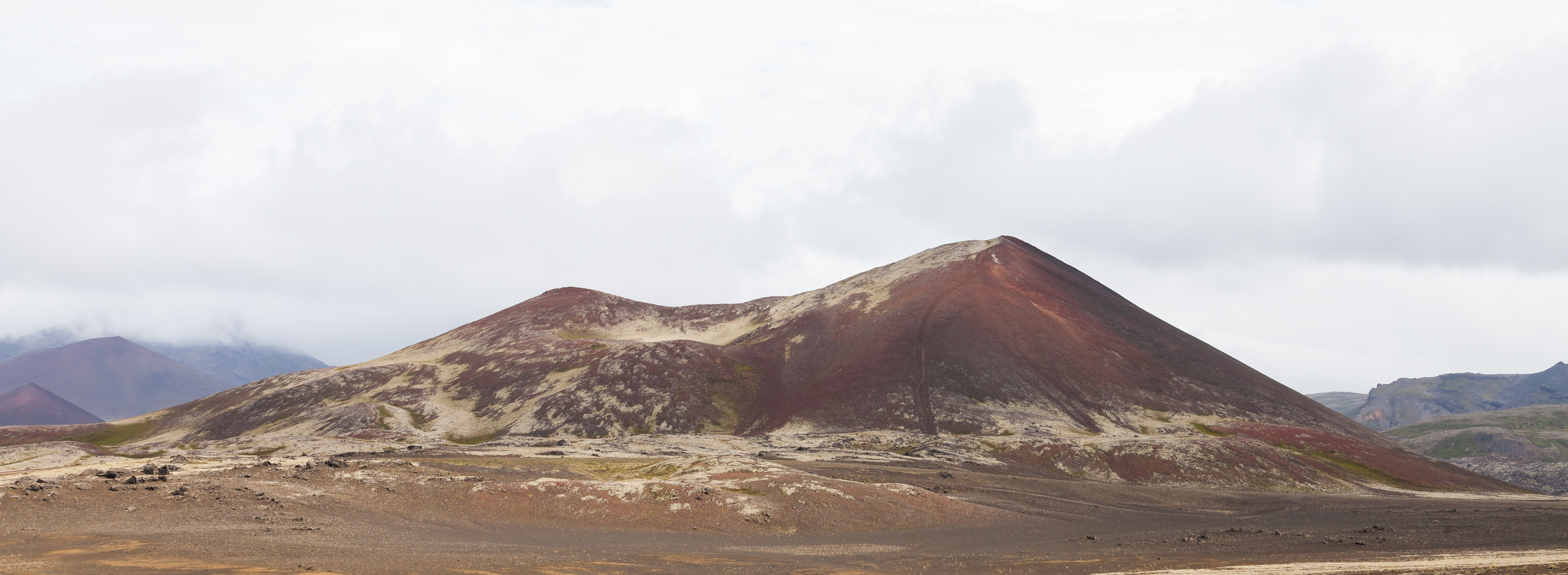
Landscape not far from Grundarfjörður, craters of the Ljósufjöll volcanic system

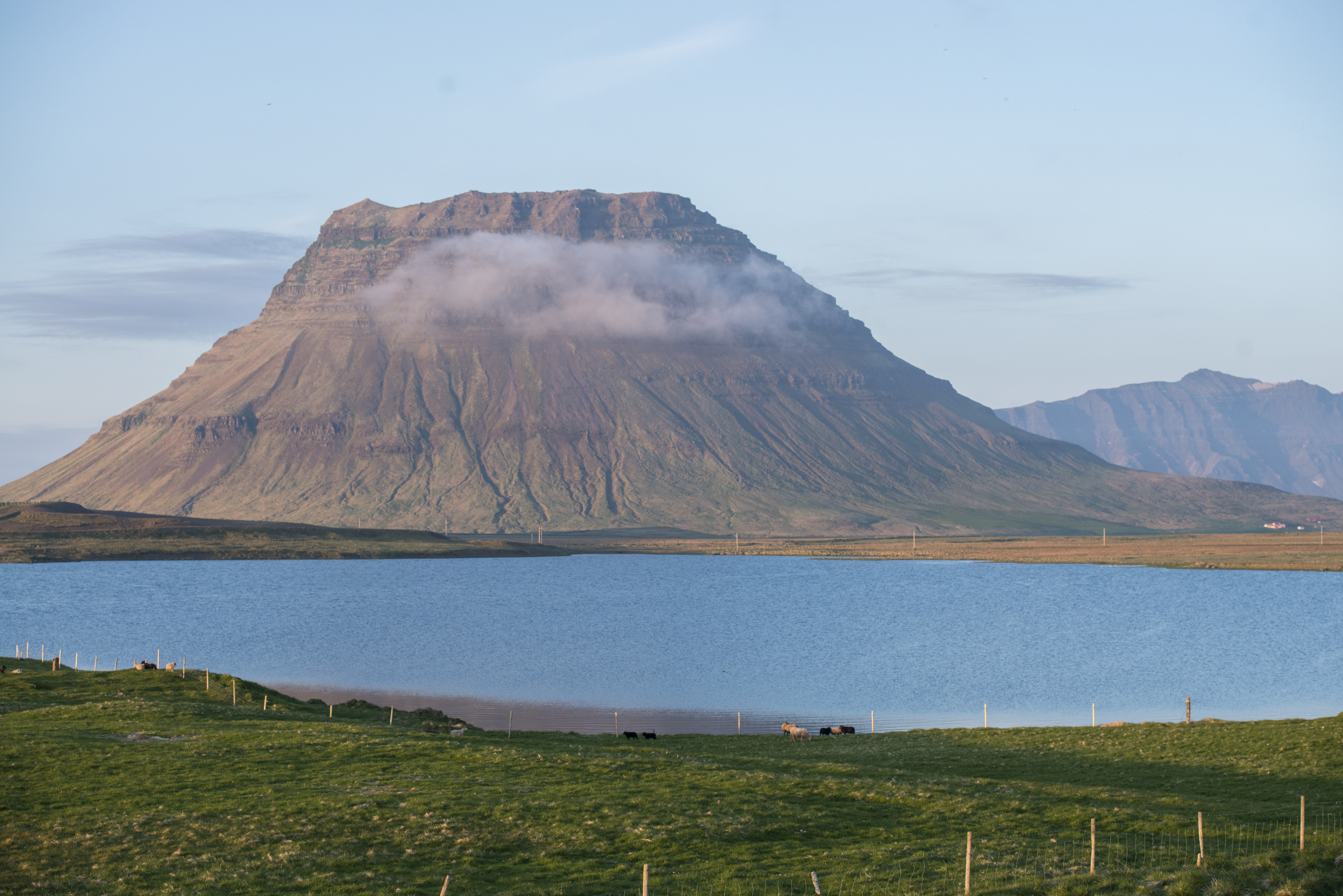
Kirkjufell Mountain in Snæfellsnes in Iceland

Grundarfjörður (Icelandic pronunciation: [ˈkrʏntarˌfjœrðʏr̥]) is a town in the north of the Snæfellsnes peninsula in the west of Iceland. It is situated between a mountain range and the sea. The nearby mountain Kirkjufell forms a small peninsula.

== Overview ==
The town received the right to do commerce in 1786. Around 1800, French merchants came to Iceland and lived in Grundarfjörður, where they constructed a church and a hospital of their own. The town became wealthy through the fishing industry, and this wealth shows in the style of the original, luxurious houses being built.

The road to nearby Stykkishólmur crosses a lava field called Berserkjahraun [ˈpɛrˌsɛr̥caˌr̥œyːn]. The name of the lava field comes from the Eyrbyggja saga, according to which two Berserkers were slain here by their master, because one of them fell in love with his master's daughter.

== Twin town ==
- Paimpol, Brittany. Grundarfjörður and Paimpol in Brittany in northwest France have strong historical connections. Between 1852 and 1935, Breton sailors from Paimpol and the surrounding region sailed to Iceland to catch cod. The connection between the two towns was sealed in a formal friendship and Grundarfjörður has been twinned with the Breton town Paimpol since 2004.

== Port and fisheries ==
Grundarfjörður's harbor is one of the 10 largest quota-fishery harbors in the country with the biggest demersal catch in West Iceland being landed here.

Grundarfjörður, Iceland from the area of Kirkjufell.

== Tourism ==
Mount Kirkjufell lies to the west of the town. Other natural features include the Kirkjufellsfoss and Grundarfoss waterfalls.

The Saga Center Grundarfjörður hosts exhibits documenting the history of the town, including a display of photographs by photographer Bæring Cecilsson. To the south is the Grundarfjörður Church. Built in 1966, it hosts one of the 500 original lithographs of the Guðbrandsbiblía, the first book to be printed in Iceland.

== Arts & Culture ==
Several outdoor art exhibits exist throughout the town. They include:

- Lúðvík Karlsson: A local folk artist whose stone sculptures number around 25, and can be found across the landscape. An art gallery and workshop at Sólvellir 6 displays more of his work.
- Sýn: A statue by Steinunn Thorarinsdottir located next to the Grundarfjörður Church, dedicated to fishermen in the community.
- Orca Statue: The large herring population in the region means that the Snæfellsnes peninsula is the only location in the country where orcas are regularly seen. The Orca Statue pays an homage to this.
- Paimpol Cross: Historically, merchants from Paimpol traded in Grundarkampur, to the west of the town. The Paimpol Cross is erected here, commemorating Breton sailors who drowned.
- Umkringja: An exhibition of 5 photographs by Nina Zurier on a fish factory by the harbor.Grundarfjörður is home to an annual festival, known as

Annually, the town entertains "Á Góðri Stund í Grundarfirði" (Eng.: Good Times in Grundarfjörður), a festival which hosts exhibitions of art and music. Traditionally, locals will decorate their streets with a certain color, and dress up in clothes of the same color for the duration of the festival.

== See also ==
- Volcanism of Iceland
- List of settlements in Iceland
