= Djúpavík =

- Village
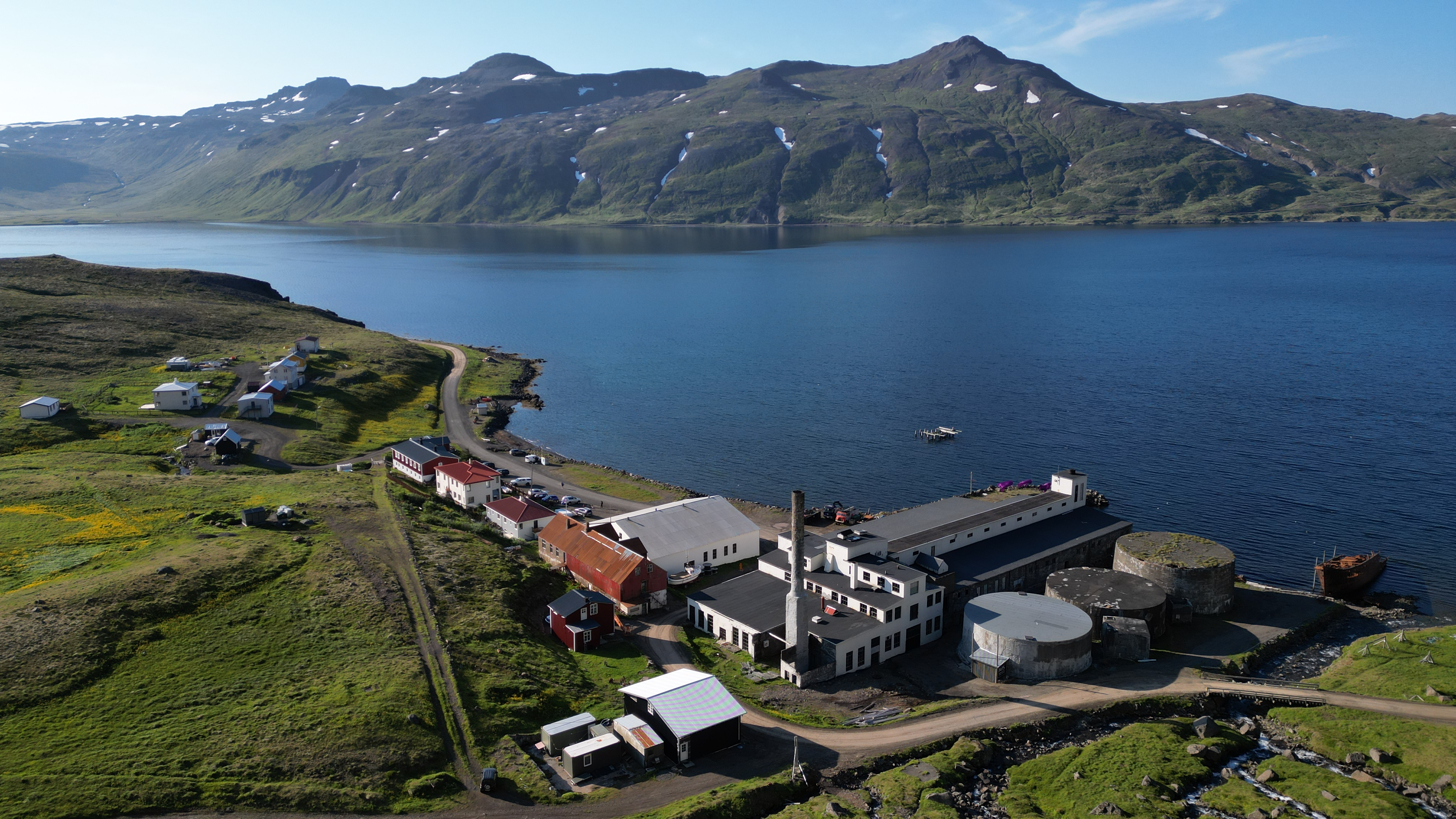
- The village of Djúpavík

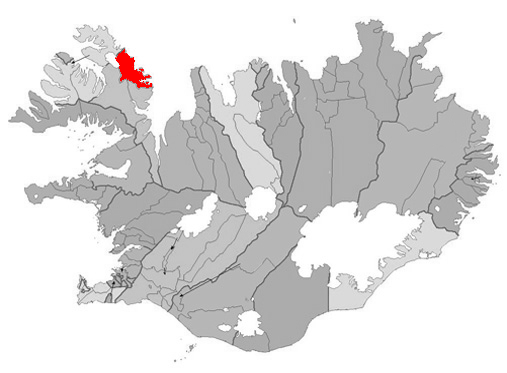
- Location of the Municipality of Árneshreppur

- Location within Iceland
- Coordinates: 65°57′N 21°34′W
- Country: Iceland
- Constituency: Northwest Constituency
- Region: Westfjords
- County: Strandasýsla
- Municipality: Árneshreppur
- Time zone: UTC+0 (GMT)
- Postal code: 524

Djúpavík (Icelandic pronunciation: [ˈtjuːpaˌviːk]) is a small village in the North-West of Iceland. It is located at the head of Reykjarfjörður on the Strandir coast in the Westfjords region (Vestfirðir), in the municipality of Árneshreppur.

It is approximately 70 km away from Hólmavík (the nearest settlement of any account), 280 km from Ísafjörður and 340 km from the country's capital Reykjavík. At present it only consists of seven houses, a hotel and the ruins of a herring factory. It can be reached by car via road 643 or by plane via the nearby Gjögur Airport.

== History of settlement ==
=== Before 1917 ===
Prior to 1917, the area around Djúpavík hosted farmsteads for hundreds of years. Around 1916 only one family lived there.

=== 1917–1934 ===
The village of Djúpavík was first settled in 1917 when Elías Stefánsson built a herring salting factory there. Guðjón Jónsson moved to Djúpavík in 1917 with his wife Krístín Guðmundsdóttir and three children to serve as the factory's supervisor. They were the village's first residents. That year brought many challenges to the herring industry in Iceland. There were shortages of fuel oil and salt, and the import price of coal and other supplies rose sharply. Both cod and herring catches were small. In the following year, the Armistice of 11 November 1918 led to reduced demand for exports from Iceland. The enterprise went bankrupt in 1919. Although the business was briefly taken over by others, the site was abandoned during the 1920s. Guðjón stayed on at the factory until 1921.

=== 1934–1983 ===
In 1934, a decline in demand for salted fish led to new investments in factories that could produce valuable herring oil. This year saw the resettlement of Djúpavík. The decision to establish Djúpavík Ltd. was made at Hótel Borg in Reykjavík on September 22, 1934. Because financing was difficult to obtain in Iceland, Djúpavík Ltd. sent representatives to Sweden to negotiate a loan to build a new herring factory. Solberg Bank in Stockholm loaned the company 400,000 Swedish krona.

Guðmundur Guðjónsson, an engineer, designed the factory and oversaw its construction. The new factory was built, and at 90 meters (300 ft) in length it was the largest concrete building in Iceland and one of the largest in Europe. There were no roads to Djúpavík so all supplies arrived by ship. Despite the harsh conditions, the construction was completed within the span of just one year and the factory was operational by July 1935. It was one of 12 new herring oil and meal factories in Iceland. However, the Djúpavík factory was unique. It was the first fully automated fish factory in Europe, with conveyor belts running from dock to basement storage rooms, then to coal-fired steam cookers, oil-extraction presses, coal-fired dryers, and meal grinders. Powerful electric fans then blew the hot fish meal through ducts that passed outside the factory for cooling and finally to chutes in the upper level where 100 kg (220 lb) meal bags were filled for transport. Electricity was generated by four German-built diesel engines salvaged from submarines and an Icelandic guard ship. The 60-tonne boiler used to generate steam for cooking was also salvaged from a ship. Initial worries that the catches would not meet requirements proved unfounded and during its early years the enterprise boomed, bringing improved financial status and living standards to the whole region.

Guðmundur Guðjónsson was the factory director from 1936, until the factory ceased operations in 1954. His wife was Ragnheiður Jörensdóttir Hansen. Their adopted daughter María Guðmundsdóttir (filmmaker) became Miss Iceland.

Herring catches started to decline after 1944, with a sharp drop in 1948 (when there were almost no catches for two years) and, despite attempts to keep the enterprise running by processing other fish besides herring, the factory closed in 1954 while Djúpavík Ltd. was officially dissolved in 1968. Some residents remained until about 1980.

=== 1984–present ===
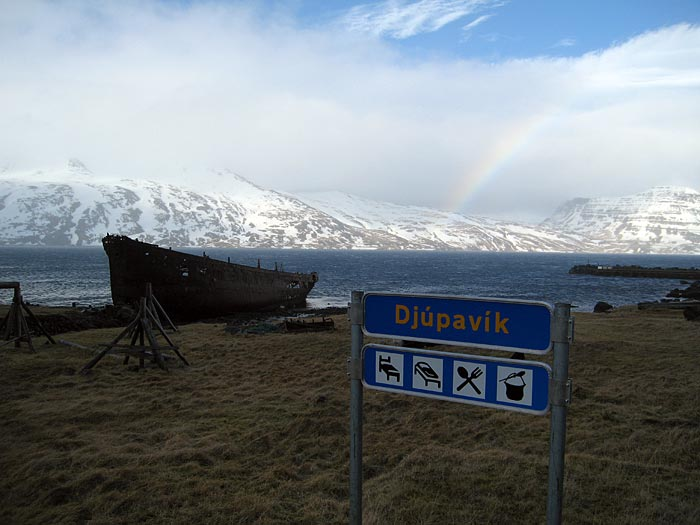
Djúpavík village sign, wreck of the Suðurland freight ship

In 1984 Ásbjörn Þorgilsson, the grandson of a former Djúpavík resident, and his wife Eva Sigurbjörnsdóttir bought the herring factory, intending to repair it and start a fish breeding program. They chose instead to renovate the women's dormitory for use as a hotel to support increasing tourism in the area. Over the years, business increased, with significant growth after 2010. Ásbjörn and Eva have taken care to preserve the cultural heritage of the site and the environment. As of 2016, Hotel Djúpavík was "the only eco-friendly tourism service in Strandir...." During this time, they also made repairs to prevent further deterioration of the factory and other buildings.

Hotel business is confined mostly to the summer months. The nearest major route (road 61) is located 60 km (37 mi) to the south, and the nearest airport is at Gjögur, 14 km (9 mi) to the north. Road 643 is the only connection between Djúpavík and these locations. This road is classified as a secondary road and is in snow clearance group G. Snow on group G roads is not cleared during the winter months causing Djúpavík to be cut off from road transportation. However, in recent years the hotel has hosted snowmobile adventurers who follow snowmobile guides from Hólmavík to Djúpavík.

== Life in Djúpavík ==
=== 1935–1954 ===
Djúpavík was unlike other villages in the region. The streets were not named, and were no police, churches, liquor stores or bars, although it had a shop and bakery owned by Djúpavík Ltd.

The population of Djúpavík was approximately 260 during much of this period. While most of the population was seasonal, the manager and his family lived there year-round.

Men and women sought work at the factory during the summer fishing season. Men worked inside the factory loading coal into ovens, operating machinery, and loading meal bags onto transport vehicles. Women worked long hours outdoors near the dock, often in adverse weather conditions. They removed the heads and bones, packed the herring in salt, and placed them in large wooden barrels. While men were paid for the time they worked, women were paid for each barrel they filled. Although they earned significantly less than the men in the factory, many women sought this work because they earned more than they could doing clerical and domestic work in Reykjavik.

One of Elías Stefánsson's timber houses was refurbished and served as a women's dormitory. Men slept in the former freight and passenger ship Suðurland (ship) - known as M. Davidsen (ship) prior to 1919 - which was purchased by Djúpavík Ltd. in 1935 and docked next to the factory for that purpose. The upper cabins were comfortable. However, the lower cabins had no portholes and poor ventilation. Other men slept in the upper floor of the canteen. Married couples who wanted to be together were required to sleep in tents away from the other living quarters. Men were served meals in a cafeteria located behind the factory. Women prepared their own meals in the dormitory kitchen. For entertainment, dances were held on the first floor of the women's dormitory. There was no access from the dance hall to the dormitory kitchen or the stairs leading to the second floor. To avoid unwanted pregnancies, much care was taken to keep men away from the women's quarters.

=== 1985–present ===
When Ásbjörn, Eva and their three children moved to Djúpavík in 1985, they were its only residents. Finances were difficult while renovating the hotel and during the early years of operation. To repair the factory, they bought supplies as they could afford them and did much of the work themselves. The two younger children attended school in Trékyllisvík, about 20 km (12 mi) by road to the north. When snow made the road impassible, Ásbjörn transported his children to and from Gjögur in a small boat. Windy conditions sometimes made docking impossible, causing the children to either stay home from school or remain at school for weeks. After a particularly harrowing incident when his daughter nearly fell from the jetty at Gjögur, Ásbjörn bought a snowmobile for winter transportation to and from school. From 10th grade until graduation the children attended school in Hólmavík and stayed there during the winter.

As of 2010 Djúpavík had two year-round residents and three summer residents.

== Restoration of buildings ==
In 1984, there was significant damage and decay in the factory due to decades of neglect and vandalism. The original intent was to repair the factory and establish a fish farm. After considering the economics of fish farming and the increase in tourism, Ásbjörn and Eva decided to preserve the factory as a museum. One of the first tasks was to replace the windows. Over many years masonry has been patched and roofs repaired. As of November 2017 roof repairs continue. The work is done primarily by family members and a few hired workers. The core of the factory contains the original machinery as it was found in 1984 and educational displays which preserve the history of Djúpavík. The large storage areas of the factory are used for art exhibitions, concerts, and special events such as weddings. Events like these help finance the preservation of the site without interfering with its cultural heritage.

In the hotel, necessary structural repairs were made, plumbing was added, and the dining room, kitchen, and bedrooms were updated to make them suitable for hosting overnight guests. Beyond that, the historic features of the building remain, including the original floorboards and staircase. Two other buildings have been updated similarly to provide additional hotel rooms. Other buildings on the site are owned by summer residents.

== Notable visitors ==
- In 2006, Sigur Rós performed a concert in the factory as part of their Heima tour. They chose to record their song Gitardjamm inside one of the large, empty herring oil tanks to make use of the unusual acoustics.
- In 2016, Ben Affleck, Gal Gadot, Willem Dafoe, and Jason Momoa were on site to film portions of Justice League (film).
- In 2017, Of Monsters and Men band spent time at Djúpavík to write songs.
- Artist Erró is a friend of the owners and has artwork on display at the hotel.
- Musician Svavar Knútur has visited and performed regularly.
- María Guðmundsdóttir (filmmaker), filmmaker, photographer, actor, supermodel, and Miss Iceland 1961, returned several times to visit her hometown of Djúpavík.

== In popular media ==
In the 2017 movie Justice League, Bruce Wayne goes to Djúpavík to look for Aquaman.
