= Hergilsey =

Uninhabited Icelandic island

Coordinates: 65°26′02″N 23°01′14″W

Hergilsey (pronounced [ˈhɛrcɪlsˌeiː]) is a small, uninhabited Icelandic island in Breiðafjörður. The island is most noted for having been home to Ingjald, his wife, Thorgerda and their disabled son Helgi Ingjaldsson. Ingjald sheltered Gisli while he was an outlaw.
