= Brokey =

Island in Iceland

Coordinates: 65.079°N 22.473°W

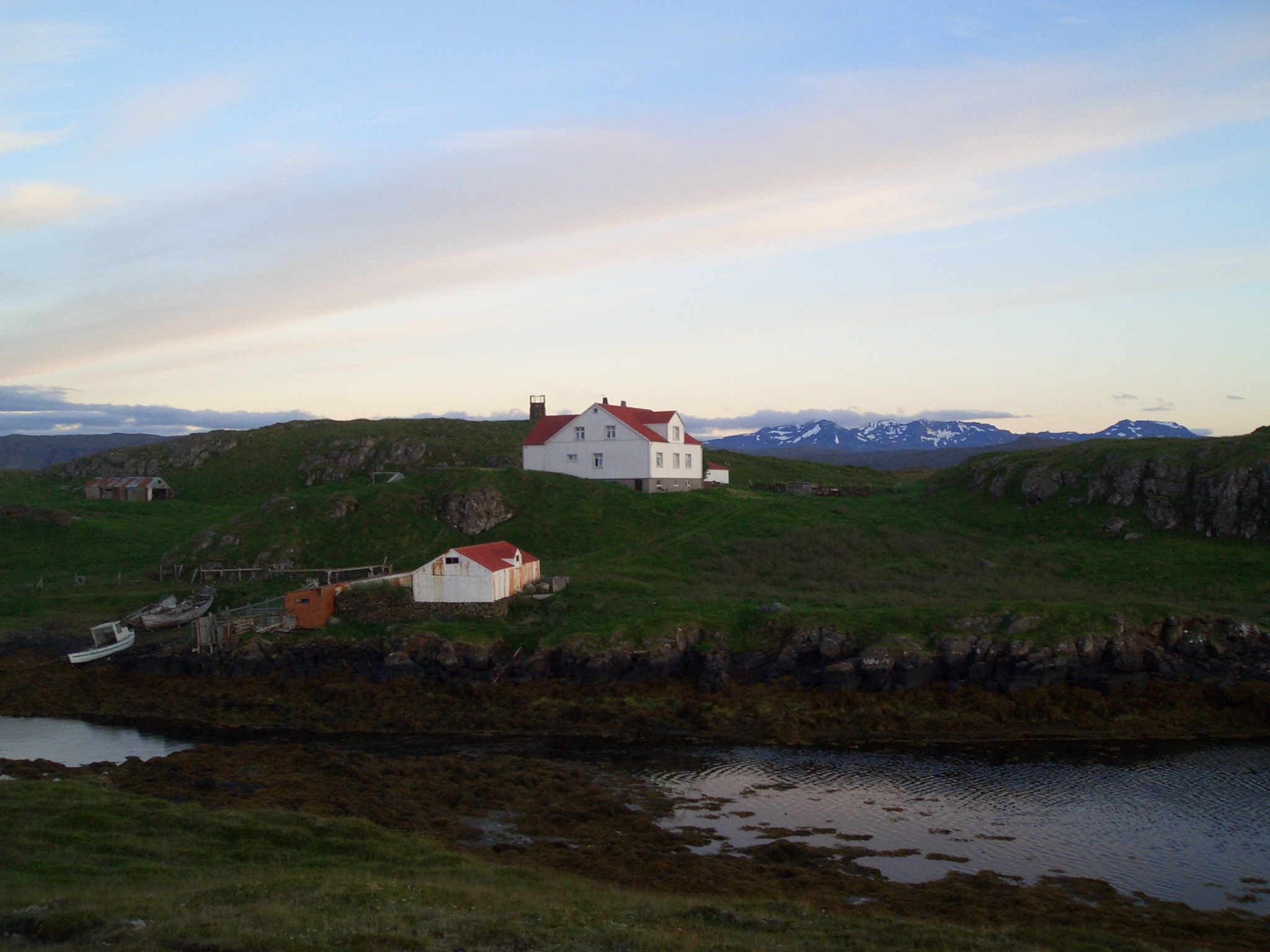

Brokey (Icelandic pronunciation: [ˈprɔːkˌeiː]) is the largest island of Breiðafjörður, Iceland. Brokey has an area 3.7 km² with its highest point 34 m above sea level. Brokey is about 1 km wide and 3.5 to 4.0 km in length.

== Notable people ==
- Jón Pétursson (1584–1667), a noted falcon hunter and pioneer in raising eider ducks and exploiting them for export.
- Hans Becker (?–1746), a Dane who was a lawyer. He wrote an essay on the restoration of Iceland.
