= Justice League (film) =

2017 superhero film directed by Zack Snyder

- Theatrical release poster
- Directed by: Zack Snyder (Note: Snyder was the director during principal photography, but was replaced by Joss Whedon during post-production. Snyder retained directorial credit for the finished film, though reports have indicated Whedon reshot a majority of the film.)
- Screenplay by: Chris Terrio; Joss Whedon
- Story by: Chris Terrio; Zack Snyder
- Based on: Justice League by Gardner Fox
- Produced by: Charles Roven; Deborah Snyder; Jon Berg; Geoff Johns
- Starring: Ben Affleck; Henry Cavill; Gal Gadot; Ezra Miller; Jason Momoa; Ray Fisher; Amy Adams; Jeremy Irons; Diane Lane; Ciarán Hinds; Connie Nielsen; J. K. Simmons
- Cinematography: Fabian Wagner
- Edited by: David Brenner; Richard Pearson; Martin Walsh
- Music by: Danny Elfman
- Production companies: Warner Bros. Pictures; Atlas Entertainment; DC Films; RatPac Entertainment (Note: On home media releases, the RatPac Entertainment logo was replaced with the Access Entertainment logo (RatPac's current owner), following the rape and sexual harassment allegations against RatPac's CEO, Brett Ratner.); Cruel and Unusual Films
- Distributed by: Warner Bros. Pictures
- Release dates: November 13, 2017 (Dolby Theatre); November 17, 2017 (United States)
- Running time: 120 minutes
- Country: United States
- Language: English
- Budget: $300 million
- Box office: $661.3 million

Justice League is a 2017 American superhero film based on the DC Comics superhero team. Produced by Warner Bros. Pictures, DC Films, RatPac-Dune Entertainment, Atlas Entertainment, and Cruel and Unusual Films, and distributed by Warner Bros., it is the fifth installment in the DC Extended Universe (DCEU). Directed by Zack Snyder, and written by Chris Terrio and Joss Whedon, the film features an ensemble cast including Ben Affleck, Henry Cavill, Gal Gadot, Ezra Miller, Jason Momoa, Ray Fisher, Amy Adams, Jeremy Irons, Diane Lane, Connie Nielsen, and J. K. Simmons. In the film, following the events of Batman v Superman: Dawn of Justice (2016), Batman and Wonder Woman recruit the Flash, Aquaman, and Cyborg after the death of Superman to save the world from the catastrophic threat of Steppenwolf and his army of Parademons.

Warner Bros. began to develop a live-action Justice League film in 2007 with George Miller set to direct, but the project was canceled due to production delays and budgetary concerns. Principal photography took place from April to October 2016. After Snyder stepped down from the film following the death of his daughter, Whedon was hired to oversee the remainder of post-production, including writing and directing additional scenes, as well as reshooting a large portion of the film, which changed many aspects of it; Snyder ultimately retained sole credit as director. With an estimated production budget of $300 million, Justice League is one of the most expensive films ever made.

Justice League premiered at the Dolby Theatre in Hollywood, Los Angeles on November 13, 2017, and was released in the United States four days later. The film received mixed to negative reviews from critics, and grossed $661.3 million worldwide against an assumed break-even point of $750 million, becoming a box-office bomb. A director's cut, titled Zack Snyder's Justice League, was released on HBO Max in 2021, following a fan campaign that advocated for Snyder's vision for the film.

== Plot ==
Steppenwolf and his legions of Parademons attempt to take over the Earth using the combined energies of the three Mother Boxes. The attempt is foiled by a unified alliance including the Olympian Gods, Amazons, Atlanteans, humanity, and extraterrestrial beings. (Note: Identified offscreen as the Green Lantern Yalan Gur) The Mother Boxes are separated and hidden in different locations. Thousands of years later, Superman's death following the battle with Doomsday reactivates the Boxes, attracting Steppenwolf again to Earth. He aims to gather the Boxes to form "The Unity", which would instantly devastate Earth and terraform it into a copy of his homeworld.

Steppenwolf retrieves one Mother Box from Themyscira, prompting Queen Hippolyta to warn her daughter Diana. Diana joins Bruce Wayne in an attempt to unite other metahumans to their cause: Wayne goes after Arthur Curry and Barry Allen, while Diana locates Victor Stone. Bruce fails to persuade Arthur but finds Barry enthusiastic. Victor joins after his father Silas and other S.T.A.R. Labs employees are kidnapped by Steppenwolf, who is seeking the Mother Box protected by humanity.

Steppenwolf attacks an Atlantean outpost to retrieve the next Mother Box, forcing Arthur into action. Victor retrieves the last Mother Box for the group, revealing that his father used it to rebuild Victor's body after an accident almost killed him. Knowing this information, Bruce decides to use the Mother Box to resurrect Superman, not only to help them fight off Steppenwolf's invasion but also to restore hope to humanity.

Clark Kent's body is exhumed and placed in the amniotic fluid of the genesis chamber in the Kryptonian scout ship, along with the Mother Box, successfully resurrecting him. However, his memories have not returned, and he attacks the group. Batman enacts his contingency plan: Lois Lane. Superman calms down and leaves with her to his family home in Smallville, where his memories come back. In the turmoil, the last Mother Box is left unguarded, allowing Steppenwolf to retrieve it. Without Superman to aid them, the five heroes travel to a village in Russia, where Steppenwolf's lair is located. They fight their way through the Parademons; just when all hope seems lost, Superman arrives and assists Victor in separating the Mother Boxes. The team defeats Steppenwolf, who is attacked by his own Parademons when they smell his fear.

After the battle, Bruce and Diana set up a base of operations for the team. Diana and Arthur resume their heroic duties; Barry acquires a job in Central City's police department; Victor continues to enhance his abilities with his father in S.T.A.R. Labs; Superman resumes his life as reporter Clark Kent and protector of Earth. In a post-credits scene, Lex Luthor has escaped from Arkham Asylum and recruits Slade Wilson to form a league of their own.

== Cast ==
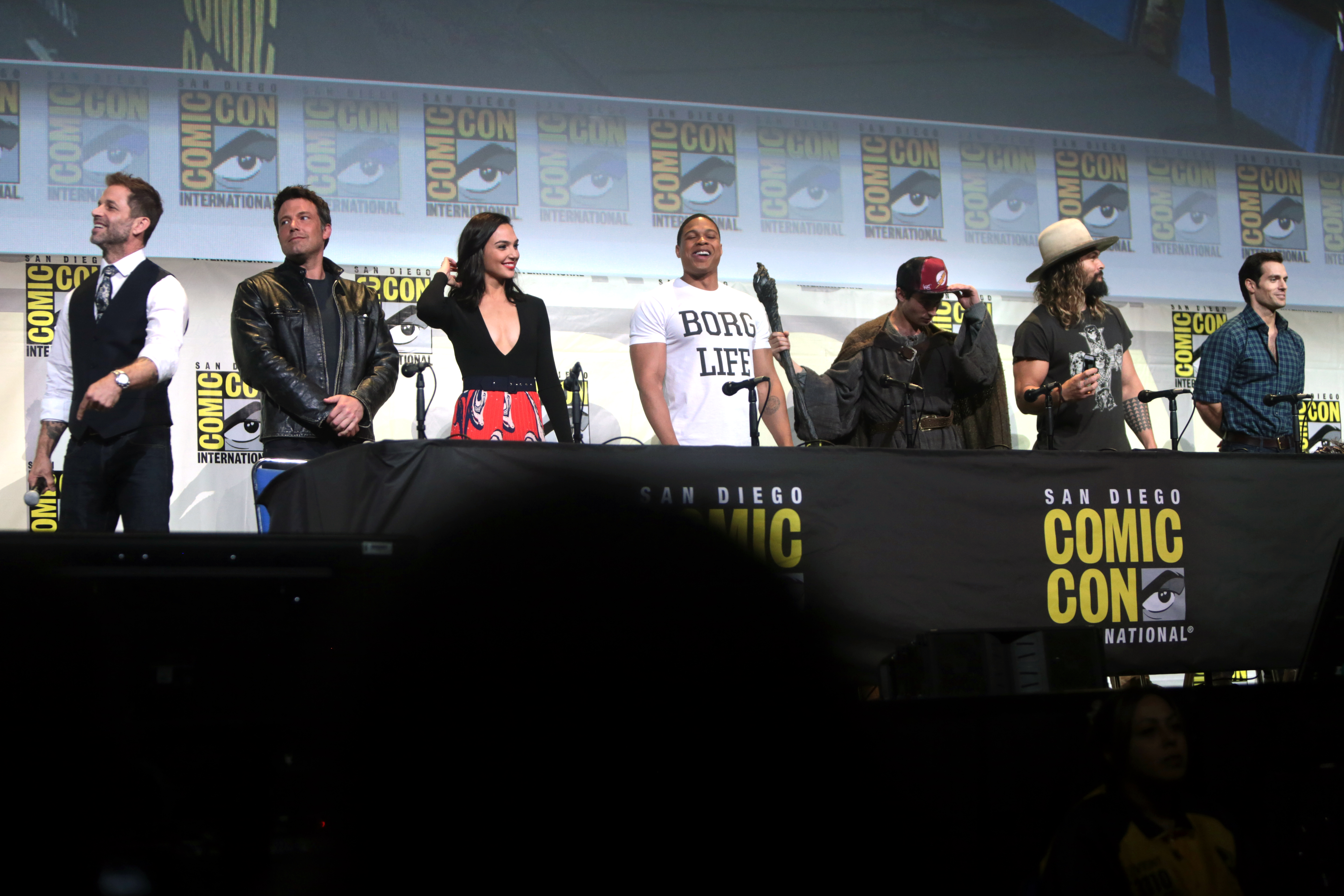
Cast of Justice League at the 2016 San Diego Comic-Con with Zack Snyder

- Ben Affleck as Bruce Wayne / Batman:
  A wealthy socialite, and the owner of Wayne Enterprises. He dedicates himself to protecting Gotham City from its criminal underworld as a highly trained, masked vigilante equipped with various tools and weapons. Affleck noted on how the film gave him an opportunity to reinvent Batman and portray a more classic take on the character. He described that in the film, audiences will see Batman as more heroic, and more of a leader. "Batman is by nature, [while] not necessarily anti-social, pretty private, pretty a loner," Affleck says. "And then in this movie he's thrust into the role of having to not only work with people, but bring them together and convince them to come in and try to ... somehow with Wonder Woman hold all that community effort together. That was a really interesting thing to play for me, and it also does take us to a more traditional role for Batman in the Justice League comics, and his role with the Justice League versus the sort of less typical version we saw in Batman v Superman, where he was blinded by rage and wanted to take on Superman."
- Henry Cavill as Clark Kent / Superman:
  A member of, and inspiration for, the Justice League. He is a Kryptonian survivor and a journalist for the Daily Planet based in Metropolis. In Justice League, Superman was portrayed as more optimistic and hopeful. The character was intentionally excluded from all Justice League marketing materials to emphasize his death as depicted on Batman v Superman: Dawn of Justice.
- Gal Gadot as Diana Prince / Wonder Woman:
  An antiquities dealer, acquaintance of Wayne, and an immortal Amazonian warrior who is the crown princess of Themyscira and daughter of Hippolyta and Zeus. She is endowed with metahuman attributes and abilities inherited from her parents.
- Ezra Miller as Barry Allen / the Flash:
  A Central City University student who can move at superhuman speeds with his ability to tap into the Speed Force.
- Jason Momoa as Arthur Curry / Aquaman:
  Half-human and half Atlantean metahuman with superhuman strength and aquatic abilities. Momoa was cast as Aquaman in June 2014, and made a cameo appearance in Batman v. Superman: Dawn of Justice.
- Ray Fisher as Victor Stone / Cyborg:
  A former college athlete who, after being cybernetically reconstructed after a nearly fatal car accident, is turned into a techno-organic being enhanced by reactive, adaptive biomimetic alien technology. His enhancements include the abilities of flight, variable weaponry and technopathy. Fisher portrays the character through the use of motion capture for the cybernetic portion of his body. Fisher was cast as Cyborg in April 2014, and made a cameo in Batman v Superman: Dawn of Justice.
- Amy Adams as Lois Lane:
  An undaunted and compassionate award-winning journalist for the Daily Planet and the love interest for Kent.
- Jeremy Irons as Alfred Pennyworth:
  Wayne's butler, chief of security, and trusted confidant.
- Diane Lane as Martha Kent:
  Kent's adoptive mother.
- Connie Nielsen as Queen Hippolyta:
  Diana's mother and the Amazonian Queen of Themyscira.
- J. K. Simmons as Commissioner James Gordon:
  The Gotham City Police Department Commissioner, and close ally of Batman.
- Ciarán Hinds as Steppenwolf:
  An alien military officer from Apokolips who leads an army of Parademons and is searching for the three Mother Boxes held on Earth. The character is described as "old, tired" and trying to find a way to escape his role of servitude under Darkseid. Hinds portrayed the villain through use of motion capture and received some advice in the process from Liam Neeson, who had recently done similar work in A Monster Calls. After the release of the film, Hinds was reportedly unhappy with the final cut of the film, which trimmed down the backstory and characterization of Steppenwolf.
- Amber Heard as Mera:
  A princess of Xebel who approaches Curry to discuss the nature of the Mother Boxes.
- Joe Morton as Silas Stone:
  Victor Stone's father and head of S.T.A.R. Labs.

During a scene a half-hour into the film, depicting Steppenwolf's first invasion thousands of years earlier, Olympian Old Gods Zeus, Ares, and Artemis are portrayed by fitness model Sergi Constance, stuntman Nick McKinless, and MMA fighter Aurore Lauzeral, respectively. All three were required to reach a specific degree of physicality, with Snyder instructing McKinless to sport "veins like worms and paper thin skin". In the finished film, McKinless' face was replaced with that of David Thewlis using special effects; Thewlis received the credit as Ares. The scene also shows a Green Lantern, named Yalan Gur, created through motion-capture CGI and embodied by an uncredited actor. Two ancient leaders of Earth appear during the scene, including King Atlan of Atlantis and King Arthur Pendragon of ancient England; portrayed by Julian Lewis Jones and Francis Magee, respectively. Billy Crudup appears, uncredited, as Henry Allen, Barry Allen's father. Joe Manganiello and Jesse Eisenberg appear uncredited in a post-credits scene as Slade Wilson / Deathstroke and Lex Luthor, respectively. Michael McElhatton appears as the leader of a group of terrorists who clash with Wonder Woman early in the film, while Holt McCallany makes an uncredited appearance as a burglar. Marc McClure, who portrayed Jimmy Olsen in the Christopher Reeve Superman film series, has a brief cameo as a police officer.

Willem Dafoe and Kiersey Clemons filmed scenes as Nuidis Vulko and Iris West, although their roles were cut from the final film. A scene depicting Green Lanterns Kilowog and Tomar-Re visiting Batman was filmed as an additional post-credits scene, further teasing the upcoming Green Lantern Corps, but the scene was later scrapped. Other scenes that were filmed, but cut from the theatrical film, include: Ryan Zheng as Ryan Choi, setting up the character's future as The Atom; a fight between Ares and Darkseid, with the villain portrayed by Ray Porter; Harry Lennix reprising his role from Man of Steel and Batman v Superman as Calvin Swanwick, in a scene where it would have been revealed that his character is actually J'onn J'onzz / Martian Manhunter; and scenes featuring Darkseid's servant DeSaad, with the character voiced by Peter Guinness. These characters were included in Zack Snyder's Justice League.

== Production ==
=== Background ===
We're going to make a Justice League movie, whether it's now or 10 years from now. But we're not going to do it and Warners is not going to do it until we know it's right.

— Producer Gregory Noveck, on whether Warner Bros. is going to do a Justice League film, 2008.

In February 2007, it was announced that Warner Bros. Pictures had hired husband-and-wife duo Michele and Kieran Mulroney to write a script for a Justice League film. The news came around the same time that Joss Whedon's long-developed Wonder Woman film was canceled, as well as The Flash, written and directed by David S. Goyer. Reportedly titled Justice League: Mortal, the script by Michele and Kieran Mulroney was submitted to Warner Bros. in June 2007, receiving positive feedback, which prompted the studio to immediately fast track production in the hope of beginning filming before the 2007–08 Writers Guild of America strike. Warner Bros. was less willing to proceed with development of a sequel to Superman Returns (2006), having been disappointed with its box office. Brandon Routh was not approached to reprise the role of Superman in Justice League: Mortal, nor was Christian Bale from Batman Begins (2005). Warner Bros. intended for Justice League: Mortal to be the start of a new film franchise, and to branch out into separate sequels and spin-offs. Shortly after filming The Dark Knight (2008), Bale stated in an interview that "It'd be better if it doesn't tread on the toes of what our Batman series is doing," and felt it would make more sense for Warner Bros. to release the film after The Dark Knight Rises (2012). Jason Reitman was the original choice to direct Justice League, but he turned it down, as he considers himself an independent filmmaker and prefers to stay out of big budget superhero films. George Miller signed to direct in September 2007, with Barrie Osbourne producing on a projected $220 million budget.

The following month, roughly 40 actors and actresses auditioned for the ensemble superhero roles, among them Joseph Cross, Michael Angarano, Max Thieriot, Minka Kelly, Adrianne Palicki, and Scott Porter. Miller had intended to cast younger actors, as he wanted them to "grow" into their roles over the course of several films. D. J. Cotrona was cast as Superman, along with Armie Hammer as Batman. Jessica Biel reportedly declined to play Wonder Woman role after negotiations. The character was also linked to actresses Teresa Palmer and Shannyn Sossamon, along with Mary Elizabeth Winstead, who confirmed that she had auditioned. Ultimately, Megan Gale was cast as Wonder Woman, while Palmer was cast as Talia al Ghul, whom Miller had in mind to act with a Russian accent. The script for Justice League: Mortal would have featured John Stewart as Green Lantern, a role originally offered to Columbus Short. Hip hop recording artist and rapper Common was cast, with Adam Brody as Barry Allen / Flash, and Jay Baruchel as the lead villain, Maxwell Lord. Longtime Miller collaborator Hugh Keays-Byrne had been cast in an unnamed role, rumored to be Martian Manhunter. Santiago Cabrera was eventually revealed to be Aquaman after the film was cancelled. Marit Allen was hired as the original costume designer before her untimely death in November 2007, and the responsibilities were assumed by Weta Workshop.

However, the writers strike began that same month and placed the film on hold. Warner Bros. had to let the options lapse for the cast, but development was fast tracked once more in February 2008 when the strike ended. Warner Bros. and Miller wanted to start filming immediately, but production was pushed back three months. Originally, the majority of Justice League: Mortal was to be shot at Fox Studios Australia in Sydney, with other locations scouted nearby at local colleges, and Sydney Heads doubling for Happy Harbor. The Australian Film Commission had a say with casting choices, giving way for George Miller to cast Gale, Palmer and Keays-Bryne, all Australian natives. The production crew was composed entirely of Australians, but the Australian government denied Warner Bros. a 40 percent tax rebate as they felt they had not hired enough Australian actors. Miller was frustrated, stating that "A once-in-a-lifetime opportunity for the Australian film industry is being frittered away because of very lazy thinking. They're throwing away hundreds of millions of dollars of investment that the rest of the world is competing for and, much more significantly, highly skilled creative jobs." Production offices were then moved to Vancouver Film Studios in Canada. Filming was pushed back to July 2008, while Warner Bros. was still confident they could produce the film for a summer 2009 release.

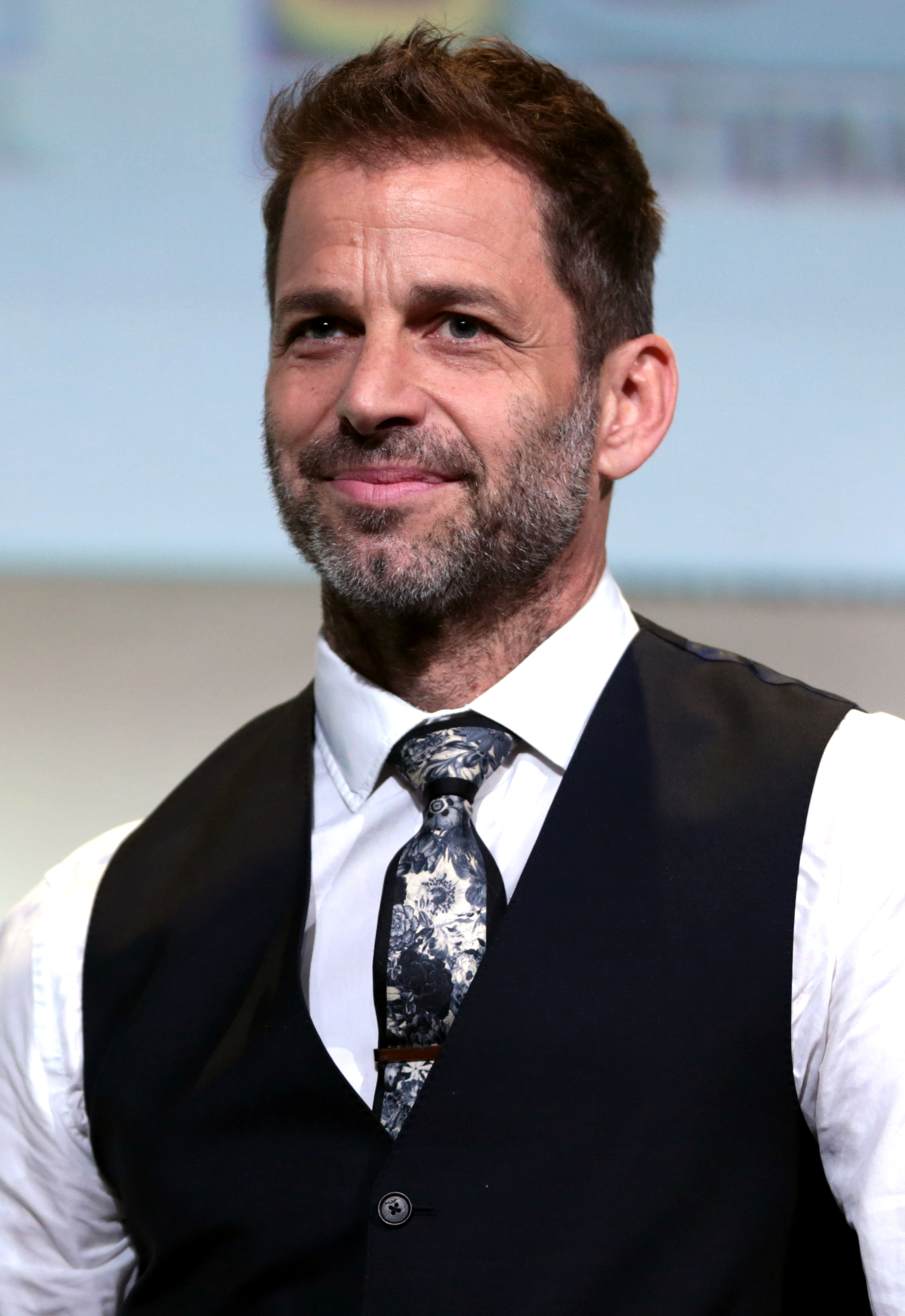
Zack Snyder, the director of Man of Steel, Batman v Superman: Dawn of Justice, and Justice League.

With production delays continuing, and the success of The Dark Knight in July 2008, Warner Bros. decided to focus on the development of individual films featuring the main heroes, allowing director Christopher Nolan to separately complete his The Dark Knight trilogy with The Dark Knight Rises in 2012. Warner Bros. relaunched development for a solo Green Lantern film, released in 2011 as a critical and financial disappointment. Meanwhile, film adaptations for The Flash and Wonder Woman continued to languish in development, while filming for a Superman reboot commenced in 2011 with Man of Steel (2013), produced by Nolan and written by Batman screenwriter David S. Goyer. In October 2012, following its legal victory over Joe Shuster's estate for the rights to Superman, Warner Bros. announced that it planned to move ahead with the Justice League film. Shortly after filming on Man of Steel was complete, Warner Bros. hired Will Beall to write the script for a new Justice League film. Warner Bros. president Jeff Robinov explained that Man of Steel would be "setting the tone for what the movies are going to be like going forward. In that, it's definitely a first step." The film included references to the existence of other superheroes in the DC Universe, and set the tone for a shared fictional universe of DC Comics characters on film. Goyer stated that should Green Lantern appear in a future installment, it would be a rebooted version of the character, unconnected to the 2011 film.

With the release of Man of Steel in June 2013, Goyer was hired to write a sequel, as well as a new Justice League, with the Beall draft being scrapped. The sequel, Batman v Superman: Dawn of Justice (2016), not only had a new Batman sharing the same universe as Superman but helped set up the Justice League film by introducing other superpowered DC heroes through in-universe footage cameos and teasing an impending doom through cryptic and ominous dreams and warnings. Though the universe of Man of Steel was separate from that of Nolan's The Dark Knight trilogy, he was still involved as an executive producer on both Batman v Superman and the Justice League film. In April 2014, it was announced that Man of Steel and Batman v Superman director Zack Snyder would also direct Goyer's Justice League script. Warner Bros. was reportedly courting Chris Terrio to rewrite Justice League the following July, after having been impressed with his rewrite of Batman v Superman: Dawn of Justice. On October 15, 2014, Warner Bros. announced the film would be released in two parts, with Part One being released on November 17, 2017, and Part Two on June 14, 2019. Snyder was set to direct both films. In early July 2015, EW revealed that the script for Justice League Part One had been completed by Terrio. Zack Snyder stated that the film would be inspired by the New Gods comic series by Jack Kirby. Although Justice League was initially announced as a two-part film, with the second part set for release two years after the first, Snyder stated in June 2016 that they would be two distinct, separate films and not one film split into two parts, both being stand-alone stories.

=== Filming ===
Principal photography began on April 11, 2016, with shooting taking place at Warner Bros. Studios, Leavesden, as well as various locations around London and Scotland. Additional filming took place in Chicago, Illinois; Los Angeles; and Djúpavík, in the Westfjords of Iceland. Snyder's longtime cinematographer Larry Fong was replaced by Fabian Wagner due to scheduling conflicts. Ben Affleck served as executive producer. In May 2016, it was revealed that Geoff Johns and Jon Berg would produce the Justice League films, and would also be in charge of the DC Extended Universe (DCEU), after the largely negative critical reception of Batman v Superman: Dawn of Justice. The same month, Irons stated that the Justice League storyline would be more linear and simple, compared to the theatrical version of Batman v Superman: Dawn of Justice. Johns confirmed on June 3, 2016, that the title of the film is Justice League, and later stated that the film would be "hopeful and optimistic" in comparison to previous DCEU films.

Justice League had a troubled production. During filming, it was reported that the rewrites by Geoff Johns caused issues with Chris Terrio and Warner Bros. executives. Warner Bros. was unsatisfied with how the film was shaping up under Snyder due to the negative feedback that the theatrical version of Batman v Superman received. It was reported that Warner Bros. held a footage summit for writers that include Whedon, Wonder Woman screenwriter Allan Heinberg, Seth Grahame-Smith, and Andrea Berloff. This caused numerous rewrites as Justice League was filming. Filming wrapped in October 2016.

=== Post-production ===
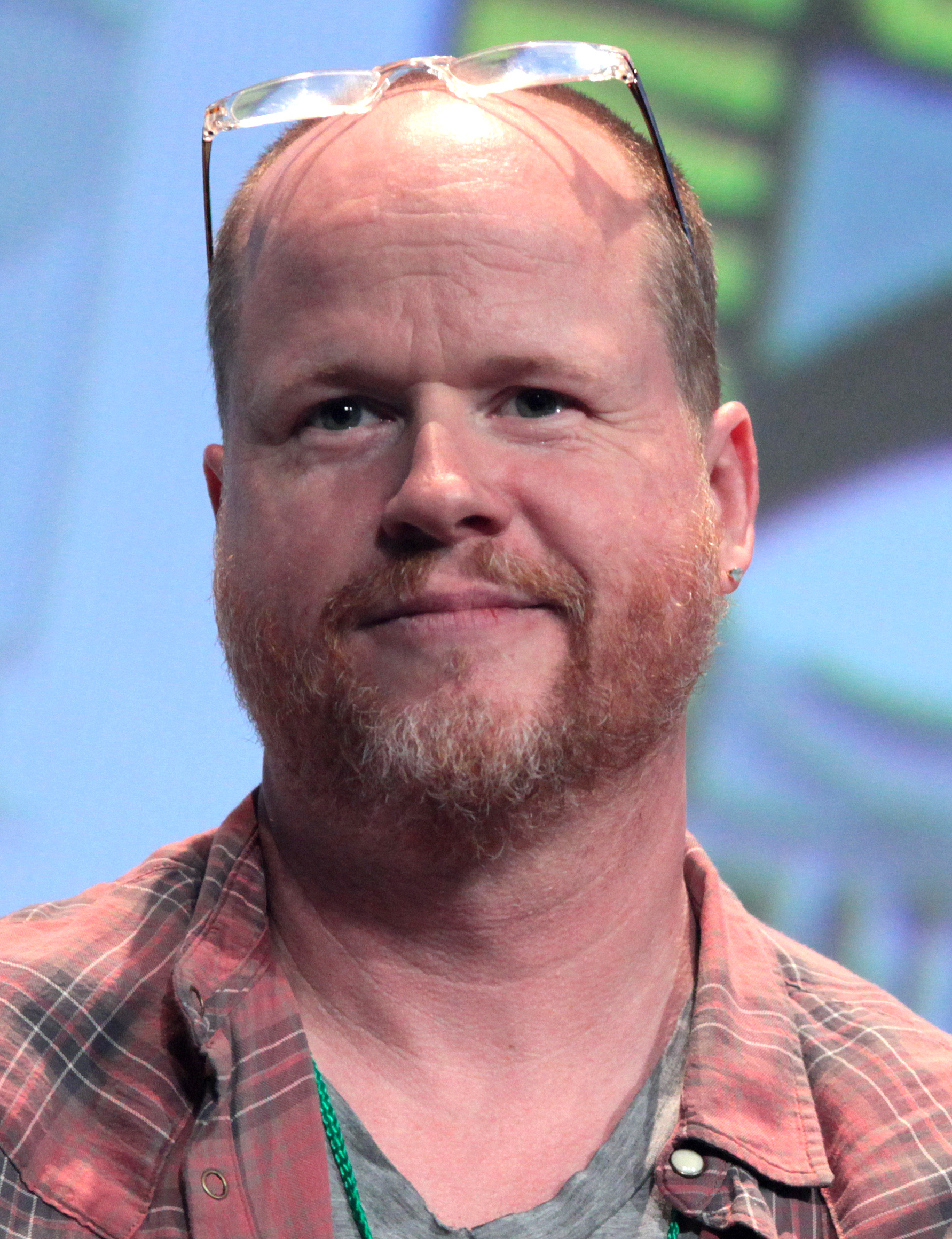
Joss Whedon took over the post-production of Justice League after Snyder stepped down.

In May 2017, Snyder stepped down from directorial duties on Justice League to cope with his daughter Autumn's suicide, and Whedon assumed his position to oversee post-production and complete the film. That July, it was announced the film was undergoing two months of reshoots in London and Los Angeles, with Warner Bros. putting about $25 million into them, more than the typical $6–10 million additional filming costs, which brought the budget of the film up to $300 million. The reshoots coincided with Cavill's schedule for Paramount Pictures' Mission: Impossible – Fallout (2018), for which he had grown a mustache which became a source of conflict for Justice League. Director Christopher McQuarrie, unwilling to let Cavill shave unless compensated, requested $3 million from the Justice League production to cover the costs of digitally re-adding Cavill's facial hair back for Fallout until it regrew. Paramount executives eventually intervened and refused permission altogether, necessitating the mustache to be digitally removed for Justice League.

Whedon received a screenwriting credit on the film alongside Chris Terrio, while Snyder received sole director's credit. Producer Charles Roven said in an interview that the film was shot originally by eighty to eighty-five percent. Conversely, Snyder estimates that only a fourth of his material was used in the theatrical version based on what he has been told of the theatrical cut, as he has not watched it. Cinematographer Fabian Wagner estimates that only 10% of the original footage shot by him and Snyder was used in the final cut. Whedon's rewrites were around 80 pages, further confirming that the theatrical cut was mostly his work.

Warner Bros. CEO Kevin Tsujihara mandated the film to be under two hours. In consequence, the final cut runs for that exact time. The company also did not opt to delay the film's release despite the fact that there had been numerous problems in post-production, so that the executives would receive their cash bonuses before the company's merger with AT&T. In February 2018, it was reported that Snyder was fired from directorial duties from Justice League, after his cut was deemed "unwatchable" according to Collider's Matt Goldberg. "I'd heard similar things from separate sources over the last year as well, I also heard that Snyder's rough-cut of the movie was 'unwatchable' (a word that jumped out at me because it's rare you hear two separate sources use exactly the same adjective). Of course, even if that's true, there's obviously more to the story since rough cuts can be fixed up with reshoots, rewrites, etc.," Goldberg wrote. According to DC Comics publisher, comic book artist Jim Lee, Snyder was not fired. Speaking at the Calgary Comic and Entertainment Expo, Lee stated "that [Snyder] was not fired at all and that he stepped down from the production due to a family matter", as far as he knew. In July 2020, Ray Fisher claimed that Whedon's on-set treatment of the film's cast and crew was "gross, abusive, unprofessional, and completely unacceptable". Following Fisher's statements, Whedon's conduct on earlier productions came under renewed scrutiny. Several actors associated with Buffy the Vampire Slayer and Angel, most notably Charisma Carpenter, publicly alleged comparable behaviour. In May 2021, Gadot claimed that Whedon threatened to harm her career for refusing to record lines that she didn't want to say in the film. Whedon, however, denied the allegations by Gadot, stating that it was miscommunication as she is not a native English speaker. Justice League and Batman v Superman writer Chris Terrio called the theatrical cut an act of vandalism, and attempted unsuccessfully to get his name removed from the film.

== Music ==
In March 2016, Hans Zimmer, who co-composed the score for Man of Steel and Batman v Superman: Dawn of Justice, stated that he had officially retired from the "superhero business", though he would later score Dark Phoenix (2019) and Wonder Woman 1984 (2020). Junkie XL, who wrote and composed the soundtrack of Batman v Superman: Dawn of Justice with Zimmer, was originally scoring the film, but was replaced by Danny Elfman the following year in June. Elfman had previously composed scores for the films Batman (1989) and Batman Returns (1992), and the theme music for Batman: The Animated Series and the 1990 TV series, The Flash. Elfman used the Batman theme music from the 1989 film. John Williams's "Superman March" was used during "a dark, twisted moment" in the film where a resurrected Superman fights the Justice League and later during the climax where Superman arrives to defeat Steppenwolf. The film features a cover of Leonard Cohen's "Everybody Knows" performed by Sigrid, "Icky Thump" performed by the White Stripes, and a cover of the Beatles' "Come Together" performed by Gary Clark Jr. and Junkie XL. In interviews promoting the film, Elfman defended incorporating classic superhero themes by comparing the strategy to "the single-most surviving and loved theme in the world" Star Wars, and argued that reboots shouldn't needlessly throw away iconic musical heritage. WaterTower Music released the soundtrack album digitally on November 10 the same year, with a release of the physical format on December 8.

== Marketing ==
Superman was intentionally left out on all early Justice League marketing materials, including trailers, clips, and posters, which actor Cavill commented as "ridiculous". Despite his character being hidden from promotional materials, Cavill still joined the rest of the cast on the film's press tour. Clark Kent was revealed in a final trailer before the release of the film, but edited in a way that writers felt Lois Lane was dreaming about Clark. Sponsorship and marketing partners of the film included AT&T, Gillette, Mercedes-Benz, and TCL.

== Release ==
=== Theatrical ===
Justice League had its world premiere at the Dolby Theatre in Hollywood, Los Angeles, on November 13, 2017, and was released in the United States on November 17, 2017.

=== Home media ===
The film was released on digital download on February 13, 2018, and was released on Blu-ray Disc, Blu-ray 3D, 4K Ultra-HD Blu-ray, and DVD on March 13, 2018, in various international markets. The Blu-ray features two deleted scenes titled Return of Superman. It is also notable for having no director commentary from either Snyder or Whedon. As of August 20, 2021, it has made $30.4 million in DVD sales and $41.5 million in Blu-ray sales, totaling an estimated $71.9 million in domestic video sales according to The Numbers.

== Reception ==
=== Box office ===
Justice League grossed $229 million in the United States and Canada and $432.3 million in other territories for a worldwide total of $661.3 million. It had a worldwide opening of $278.8 million. Up against an estimated break-even point of as much as $750 million, Deadline Hollywood reported that the film lost the studio around $60 million. Due to the film losing the studio money, the movie was deemed a "box office bomb" or "flop".

In the United States and Canada, industry tracking initially forecast the film debuting to $110–120 million from 4,051 theaters (including 400 IMAX screens). It made $13 million from Thursday night previews, up from the $11 million made by Wonder Woman the previous June. However, after making $38.5 million on its first day (including Thursday previews), weekend projections were lowered to $95 million. It ended up debuting to $93.8 million, down 45% from Batman v Superman's opening of $166 million, and being the first film of the DCEU to open under $100 million. Deadline attributed the low figure to lukewarm audience reaction to the film and most of its predecessors, as well as poor critical reception, and film review aggregation website Rotten Tomatoes not posting their aggregated score until the day before release, causing speculation and doubt from filmgoers. In its second weekend, the film dropped 56% to $41.1 million, finishing second at the box office, behind newcomer Coco. It was the second-best second weekend hold of the DCEU, behind Wonder Woman's 43%, but the lowest overall gross. In its third week it again finished second behind Coco, grossing $16.7 million. It made $9.7 million in its fourth week and $4.3 million in its fifth, finishing a respective second and fifth at the box office. In 2018, Forbes compared the drastic incohesive shift from Snyder's darker films Man of Steel and Batman v Superman: Dawn of Justice to the lighter Justice League (co-written by Whedon), to the similarly drastic and incohesive change in tone experienced from the older 1989 and 1992 Tim Burton's Batman films to the direct light-hearted sequels directed by Schumacher, although noting the former shift in tone was better received than the one in Justice League, affecting box office, due to going against the expectations of Snyder fans in its attempt to reach a higher demographic, while alienating its own established core audience.

In other territories, the film was projected to debut to $215–235 million for a worldwide opening of $325–355 million. It made $8.5 million on its first day from nine countries, including South Korea, France, and Brazil. It ended up having a $185 million international debut from 65 countries, including $57.1 million from China, $9.8 million from the United Kingdom, $9.6 million from Mexico, and $8.8 million from South Korea. The film broke a record in the Philippines with a debut of $1.12M (PHP 57.3M), making it the biggest industry opening day for a film in 2017 and eventually becoming the 7th-most successful film of all time. In Brazil, the film opened to $14.2 million, the biggest opening in the country's history. Outside North America, the film's largest markets were China ($106 million), Brazil ($41 million), Mexico ($24.8 million), and United Kingdom ($24 million).

=== Critical response ===
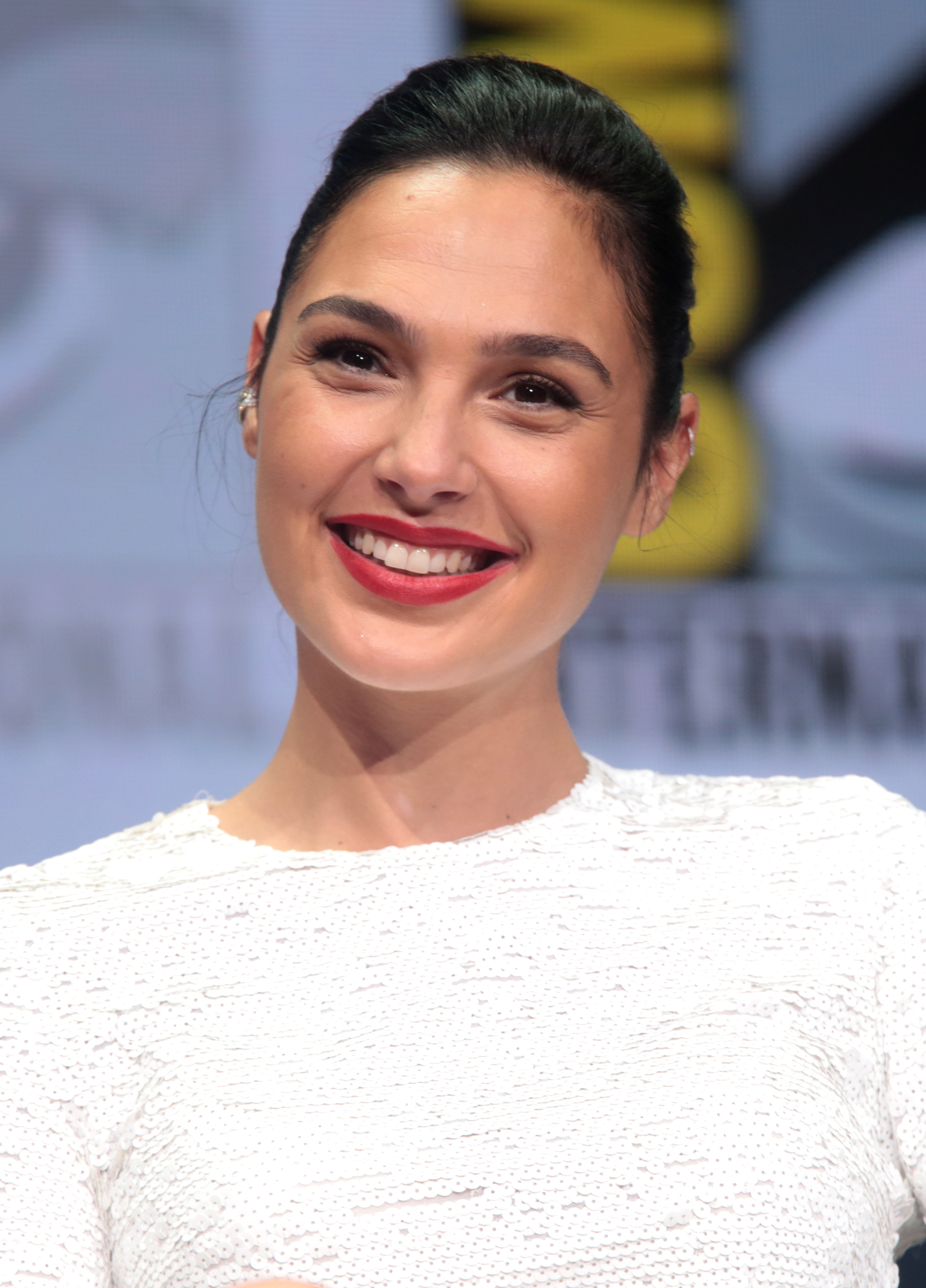
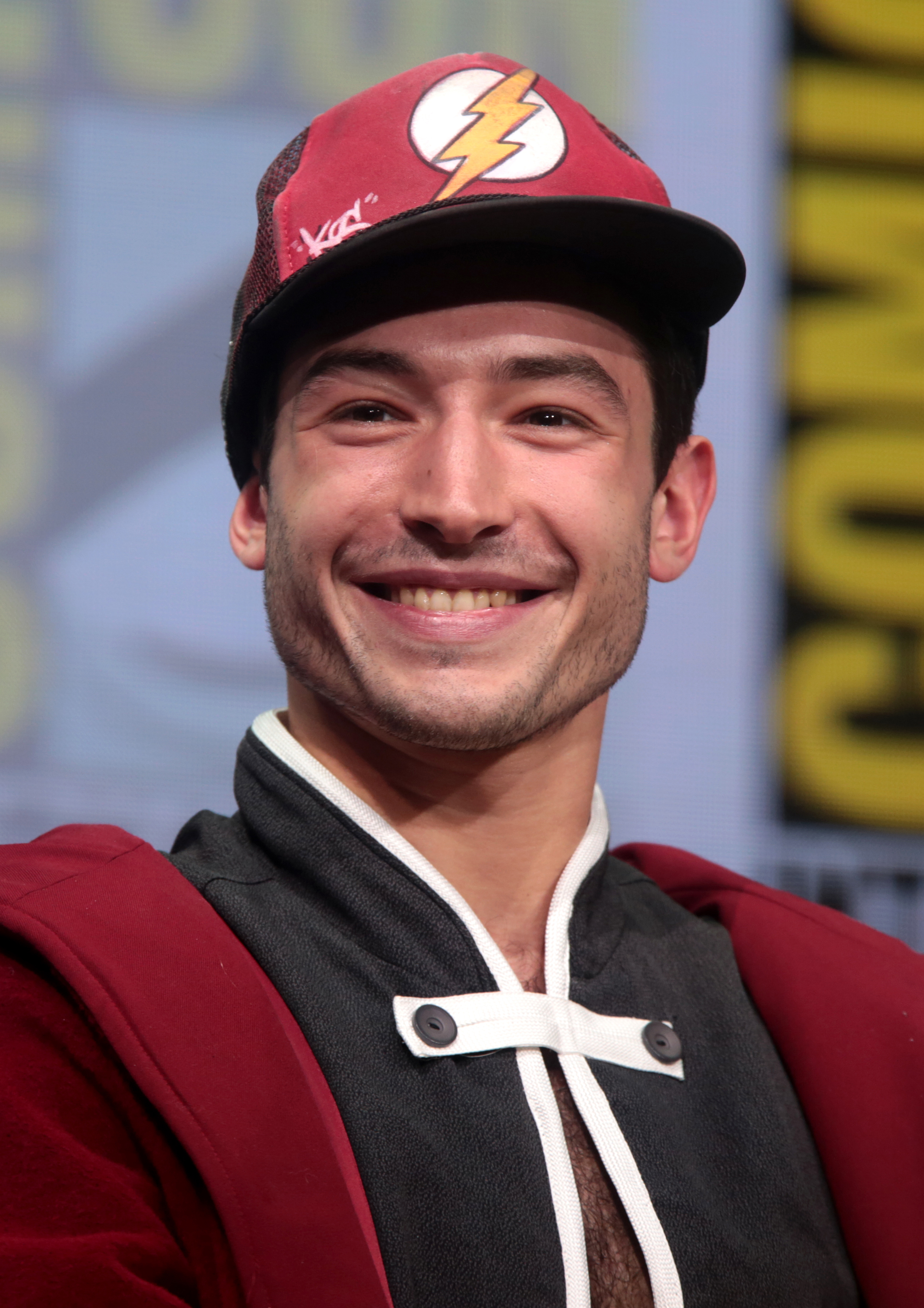
The performances of Gal Gadot (left) and Ezra Miller (right) were praised.

Justice League received mixed to negative reviews, with praise for the cast and action sequences, but it was compared unfavorably to Marvel and received criticism for the incoherent plot, direction and the character of Steppenwolf. On the review aggregator website Rotten Tomatoes, 39% of 411 critics' reviews are positive, with an average rating of 5.3/10. The website's consensus reads: "Justice League leaps over a number of DC movies, but its single bound isn't enough to shed the murky aesthetic, thin characters, and chaotic action that continue to dog the franchise." Metacritic, which uses a weighted average, assigned the film a score of 45 out of 100, based on 52 critics, indicating "mixed or average" reviews. Audiences polled by CinemaScore gave the film an average grade of "B+" on an A+ to F scale, and those by PostTrak gave the film an 85% overall positive score (average 4 out of 5 stars) and a 69% "definite recommend".

Richard Roeper of the Chicago Sun-Times gave the film 3.5 out of 4 stars, praising the cast, especially Gadot, and saying "It's a putting-the-band-together origins movie, executed with great fun and energy." Owen Gleiberman of Variety gave the film a positive review, which conceived the film and described it was not "messy or bombastic", and light, clean, and simple. Bilge Ebiri of the Village Voice similarly gave it a positive review, and said the action scenes of the film went "start and stop and then start again, [and] then go in different directions." Ebiri also describes the film had a "few moments into the Big Climactic Face-Off," but the "rhythms actually lend the film a pleasant unpredictability." Writing for Rolling Stone, Peter Travers gave the film 2.5 out of 4 stars, praising the cast but criticizing the action sequences and writing, saying: "The scenes of the League members together, bickering and bonding, spike the film with humor and genuine feeling, creating a rooting interest in the audience. Without it, the film would crumble." Conversely, Todd McCarthy of The Hollywood Reporter, while praising Gadot and Miller, called the film visually ugly and boring, saying, "Fatigue, repetition and a laborious approach to exposition are the keynotes of this affair, which is also notable for how Ben Affleck, donning the bat suit for the second time, looks like he'd rather be almost anywhere else but here."

Writing for The Washington Post, Alyssa Rosenberg also returned with a negative review, and described the film was a "symbol of just how entrenched superhero movies have become in the Hollywood ecosystem, it's also a potent illustration that success hasn't necessarily artistically elevated the genre." Rosenberg felt the film was nearly identical to lots of superhero films that "have come before", and featured some of "the ugliest, most pointless special effects." James Berardinelli gave it 2 out of 4 stars, said that the film and DC Films "came late to the party", as Marvel Studios planned their Cinematic Universe, which they were "sometimes criticized for overthinking and overplanning," and compared to The Avengers (2012), which has its "formula worked", and The Avengers was "a popcorn bliss [and] a superhero nirvana". Writing for the Film Ireland Magazine, Ellen Murray found the characters interesting, but their setting unworthy, said that "there is something undeniably thrilling in seeing these iconic characters work together on the big screen."

Wonder Woman (2017) director Patty Jenkins particularly disliked Justice League because the film itself seemed to contradict her film, as both she and Zack Snyder worked together to keep continuity between their films, in details like not changing Wonder Woman's costume, but Joss Whedon reshot the film to the point the characters were not being portrayed as previously shown in past films.

=== Accolades ===
Justice League received each nomination at two Golden Trailer Awards ceremonies: Best Action Poster (2017) and Best Wildposts (Teaser Campaign) (2018). Ezra Miller was nominated for Best Comedic Performance at the San Diego Film Critics Society Awards 2017. At the 2018 Kids' Choice Awards, the film was nominated for Favorite Movie Actor (Affleck) and Favorite Movie Actress (Gadot). Justice League garnered nominations for Choice Action Movie, Choice Action Movie Actor (Cavill), and Choice Action Movie Actress (Adams and Gadot) at the 2018 Teen Choice Awards.

== Director's cut ==
The divisive reaction towards the theatrical cut of the film, with Zack Snyder leaving directorial duties and the final cut of the film in the hands of Joss Whedon, has led to an argument comparing the situation to the one experienced by the film Superman II (1980). Both Justice League and Superman II feature a director who was replaced, for different reasons, before completion of a film, which led to a second director coming in and making substantial changes to the tone of each film. Although the reasoning behind each director's departure differs, Richard Donner was able to complete his Superman II cut in 2006. In the belief that Snyder had shot enough material for a finished film, a campaign for a "Snyder Cut" was started to allow Snyder to receive a similar treatment to that given to Donner. Arguments were made that Snyder's vision would be more cohesive to the previous films than the actual theatrical cut, which Snyder has refused to see. Warner Bros. initially remained silent regarding any intention of making a "Snyder Cut".

In March 2019, Snyder confirmed his original cut existed, and stated that it was up to Warner Bros. to release it. In November, an insider claimed that Warner Bros. was unlikely to release Snyder's version of Justice League in theaters, calling it a "pipe dream". In December, Snyder posted a photo in his Vero account, which showed boxes with tapes labeled "Z.S. J.L Director's cut", and with the caption "Is it real? Does it exist? Of course it does." Snyder officially confirmed in May 2020 that his cut of Justice League will be released for HBO Max service in 2021. The cut cost $70+ million to complete the special effects, musical score, and editing. Some of the film's original cast, including Affleck, Fisher, and Miller (remotely), returned to help complete the project, which also included limited additional filming. Jared Leto, Amy Adams, and J. K. Simmons appeared in the cut as the Joker, Lois Lane, and James Gordon, respectively. As a result of the new cut, the original theatrical cut is referred to by fans as the "Whedon Cut" or "Josstice League", referring to the film's replacement director Joss Whedon. Despite being far better received than the theatrical version, Snyder stated that his cut would not be made canon to the DCEU, with Warner Bros. still considering the 2017 cut to be the official version.

== Future ==
A sequel was originally scheduled to be released in June 2019 but was subsequently delayed to accommodate the release for The Batman (2022). By March 2017, producer Charles Roven said that Zack Snyder would direct the film and in October J. K. Simmons stated that the studio was working on the script of the sequel, alongside The Batman. Shortly after the release of Justice League, Henry Cavill said that he was under contract with Warner Bros. to play Superman for one more film. In December, it was revealed that there were "no immediate plans" for Zack Snyder to direct any future DC films, being relegated to an executive producer position instead. This came after a reshuffling of film production staff at Warner Bros. due to the film's mixed critical reception and disappointing financial performance. By 2019, Warner Bros. had prioritized solo films over the project.

In 2019, after previously declining an offer to direct the first film, Wonder Woman director Patty Jenkins noted she was open to directing a Justice League sequel.

Though Snyder's cut of Justice League has been described by DC Films executives as "a storytelling cul-de-sac" with no sequels planned, Snyder stated that he would be willing to return to direct the sequels if the studio offered him the chance. In January 2021, Ray Fisher (who had a fallout with Joss Whedon, Geoff Johns, Jon Berg and former DC Films president Walter Hamada) stated that he would only be willing to reprise his role as Cyborg in a future DCEU film if Justice League Part Two were to be made by Snyder. However, shortly after the "Snyder Cut" was released, Warner Bros. CEO Ann Sarnoff said in March that there were no current plans in place for Snyder to return as a director/writer for future DCEU films suggesting a direct sequel to his version of Justice League remained unlikely. Later in August, DC Films producer Charles Roven stated that a Justice League sequel was still possible, though it would be several years away. A sequel was once again under consideration while De Luca and Abdy were in charge of DC Films (later renamed DC Studios), before James Gunn and Peter Safran took over in 2022. In October 2023, Variety reported that no actors from Zack Snyder's DCEU films would reprise their roles in the DC Universe (DCU).

In a July 2025 Wall Street Journal article, it was reported that Gunn and Safran eventually planned to make a new Justice League film set in the DCU.
