= Sviðnur =

Island in Iceland

Native name: Sviðnur
- Location within Iceland

Geography
- Location: Atlantic Ocean
- Coordinates: 65.4115°N 22.6111°W
- Adjacent to: Atlantic ocean

Administration
- Iceland
- Constituency: Norðvesturkjördæmi
- Region: Vestfirðir
- Capital and largest city: Reykjavík (pop. 123 246)
- President: Guðni Th. Jóhannesson
- Area covered: 102,775 km^{2} (39,682 sq mi)

Demographics
- Population: 0
- Pop. density: 0/km^{2} (0/sq mi)
- Languages: Icelandic

Additional information
- Time zone: WET (UTC+0)

Sviðnur (Icelandic pronunciation: [ˈsvɪðnʏr̥]) is an uninhabited island in the Skáleyjar region of Westfjords, Iceland. The part of Vestureyjum archipelago.

The island has about one kilometer in length.
