= Skáleyjar =

Island group in Iceland

Coordinates: 65.2510°N 22.4311°W

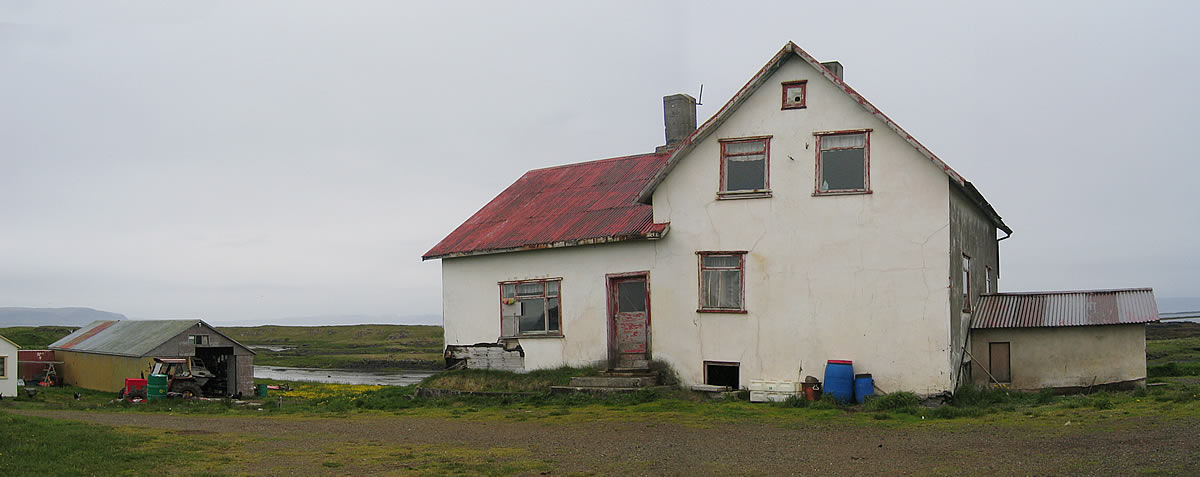
Skáleyjar farmhouse on the main island, pictured in June 2006

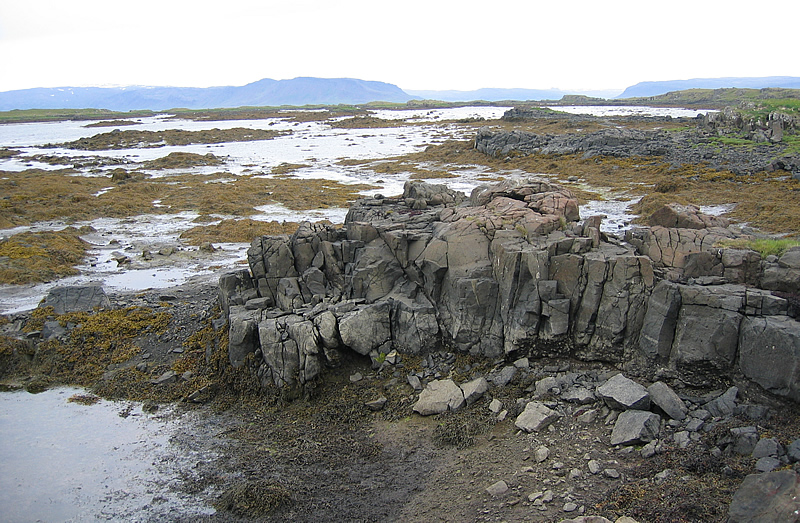
Skáleyjar coastline, pictured in June 2006

Skáleyjar (Icelandic pronunciation: [ˈskauːlˌeiːjar̥]) is a group of islands of the Breiðafjörður fjord in Westfjords, Iceland. In total, Skáleyjar consists of around 140 to 160 islands, and is an estimated 13 kilometres in length.
