= Kirkjufell =

Mountain in Iceland

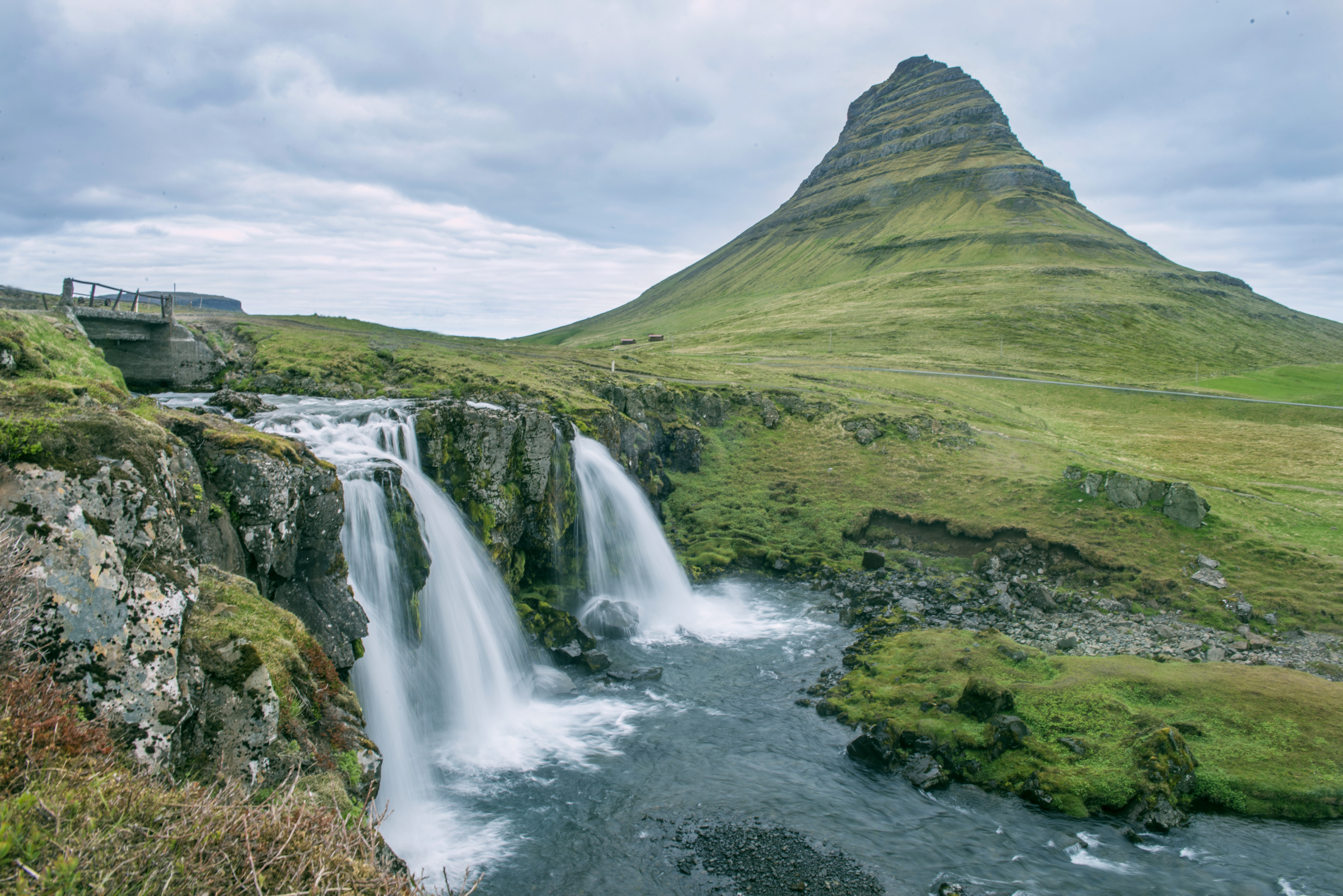

Highest point
- Elevation: 463 m (1,519 ft)
- Coordinates: 64°56′28″N 23°18′20″W

Geography
- Location: Snæfellsnes, Iceland

Geology
- Mountain type: Nunatak

Kirkjufell (Icelandic: [ˈcʰɪr̥cʏˌfɛtl̥], "Church Mountain") is a 463 m high hill on the north coast of Iceland's Snæfellsnes peninsula, near the town of Grundarfjörður. It is claimed to be the most photographed mountain in the country. Kirkjufell was one of the filming locations for Game of Thrones season 6 and 7, featuring as the "arrowhead mountain" that the Hound and the company north of the Wall see when capturing a wight.

== Geography ==
Kirkjufell contains volcanic rock but is not itself a volcano. It is a nunatak, a mountain that protruded above the glaciers surrounding it during the Ice Age, and before that was part of what was once the area's strata. This stratum is composed of alternating layers of Pleistocene lava and sandstone, with tuff at its summit.

== Mountaineering ==
Climbing Kirkjufell is possible during the summer and fall, generally taking around three hours; however, the steep sections of the climb become dangerous when wet or in bad weather. The mountain has been the scene of a number of incidents, with recorded fatalities due to falls in 1945, 2017, 2018, and 2020.
