= Árneshreppur =

- Municipality
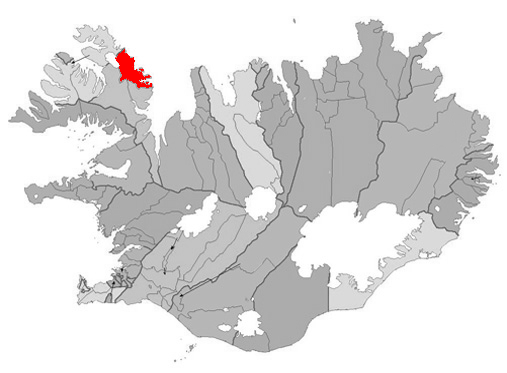
- Location of Árneshreppur

- Location within Iceland
- Coordinates: 65.980°N 21.453°W
- Country: Iceland
- Region: Westfjords
- Constituency: Northwest Constituency

Area
  - Total: 707 km^{2} (273 sq mi)

Population
  - Total: 53
  - Density: 0.07/km^{2} (0.18/sq mi)
- Postal code(s): 524
- Municipal number: 4901

Árneshreppur (Icelandic pronunciation: [ˈaurˌnɛsˌr̥ɛhpʏr̥]) is an Icelandic municipality, located in the Westfjords peninsula of northwestern Iceland. It is Iceland's lowest-populated municipality with a population of 53 based on the 2024 estimate.

The village Djúpavík at the Reykjarfjörður [ˈreiːcarˌfjœrðʏr̥] is situated in the municipality. Other villages are Gjögur [ˈcœːɣʏr̥] and Norðurfjörður [ˈnɔrðʏrˌfjœrðʏr̥]. The area is served by Gjögur Airport.

Árneshreppur is known for its natural environment with hiking paths, the exhibitions in Djúpavík and the museum Kört in Trékyllisvík. One of the main tourist attractions is Krossneslaug, a swimming pool by the seaside near the farm Krossnes [ˈkʰrɔsːˌnɛːs]. Since 2021, there is a strict nature reserve in Drangar.

In March 2026, residents voted to unify with Kaldrananeshreppur, but the referendum was declared invalid in May.
