= Ilya Salkind =

Mexican film and television producer (b. 1947)

- Born: Ilya Juan Salkind Domínguez; July 27, 1947 (age 79); Mexico City, Mexico
- Occupations: Film director; producer
- Spouses: Skye Aubrey (m. 1976; div. 1979) Patricia Bonnet (m. 1980; div. 1984) Jane Cecil Chaplin (m. 1985; div. 1999)
- Children: 5
- Parent(s): Alexander Salkind; Berta Domínguez

Ilya Juan Salkind Domínguez (/ˈsælkaɪnd/; born July 27, 1947), usually known as Ilya Salkind, is a Mexican film and television producer, known for his contributions to three of the four live-action Superman films of the 1970s and 1980s alongside his father, Alexander Salkind.

== Early life and career ==
Ilya Juan Salkind Dominguez was born July 27, 1947, in Mexico City, Mexico, the son of Berta Domínguez, a Mexican novelist, and French producer Alexander Salkind. At the age of one, Salkind was photographed sitting on the lap of Zsa Zsa Gabor. His grandfather, Mikhail Salkind, was a pioneer of silent films and produced Joyless Street (1925), featuring then-relatively-unknown Greta Garbo in her first major role. Afterwards, Mikhail, along with Ilya's own father, Alexander, joined their forces to supervise many successful films, from Abel Gance's Austerlitz (1960) to Orson Welles' The Trial (1962). Beginning in 1969, Ilya Salkind became the third generation of his film-making family. He and Alexander made numerous films, starting with the international box office hits The Three Musketeers (1973) and its 1974 follow-up, The Four Musketeers films, the first instance of which a major motion picture and its immediate sequel were shot simultaneously. Salkind was of Russian-Jewish descent.

== Superman film series ==
Ilya and Alexander, along with producing partner Pierre Spengler, purchased the film rights to the Superman property in August 1974. It was agreed that the Salkinds would produce and supervise filming on Superman and Superman II simultaneously, as had been the case with The Three Musketeers and The Four Musketeers. Securing the film rights from DC Comics (a subsidiary of Warner Bros.) was an unbearable experience for the producers, as Spengler was forced to spend two weeks in meetings with DC executives for the specific purpose of establishing an "Integrity of the character" clause. However, the producers did make sure DC approved of every aspect of the film (including dialogue). At this point in time Muhammad Ali, Dustin Hoffman, Al Pacino, James Caan, Clint Eastwood and Steve McQueen were being considered for the leading role of Superman.

William Goldman was approached to write the script, but chose not to do so, as Ilya Salkind had personally cited certain creative differences with Goldman. Eventually, Ilya would hire Godfather author Mario Puzo. The desperate search for a director then took place. Steven Spielberg expressed interest and Salkind felt comfortable in hiring him upon being impressed with his work on Duel and The Sugarland Express, though his father was skeptical, feeling that Spielberg was not famous enough and claimed they needed to wait until "that fish movie of his" was released. Jaws was released with unanimous success, though by this time it was too late as Spielberg opted to do Close Encounters of the Third Kind instead.

Peter Yates was interested in directing, and was briefly involved in negotiations, though the deal collapsed. Both William Friedkin and Sam Peckinpah were also offered the chance to direct. Friedkin turned down the offer outright, while Peckinpah dropped out of the running when he produced a gun during a meeting with Salkind. Richard Lester, Guy Hamilton, George Lucas, John Guillermin and Ronald Neame were then considered, though Lucas was dropped as Salkind found out he was too committed on Star Wars (1977). It was decided to go with Hamilton, in light of the fact that Salkind was impressed with Hamilton's work as director of, among other projects, Goldfinger and Battle of Britain.

Salkind originally recommended Mario Puzo to write the script as a serious science fiction epic. Although Puzo did impress him with certain aspects, Salkind felt the script remained intact with being overall campy, as did Guy Hamilton. In addition they cited too much "Greek tragedy and Shakespearean" elements. A fourth villain sentenced to the Phantom Zone named Zak-Ur appeared as a comedic henchman. By this time, Puzo felt he "could do all he could," turning in two drafts, and David Newman and Robert Benton were hired for rewrite work, as a means to delete objectionable material concerning an excessive number of comedic scenes. Leslie Newman was brought in once Benton left to direct The Late Show.

Casting started to take place, and Alexander Salkind wanted a famous actor in the role of Superman. Dustin Hoffman was once again highly considered though the idea was dropped. Robert Redford was offered the part, but he felt he was too famous and was not right for the role, as did Burt Reynolds. After the success of Rocky, Sylvester Stallone lobbied hard for the role but was ignored. Paul Newman was offered all three roles of Superman, Jor-El and Lex Luthor to his choosing though he did not accept any of them, for a salary of $4 million. Nick Nolte and Rex Harrison would both turn it down. It was decided to focus on casting Jor-El and Lex Luthor and save Superman for later. Hoffman was then offered the role of Luthor, and although he was interested, he turned it down. Marlon Brando would eventually be cast as Jor-El, causing Gene Hackman to be cast as Luthor as he wanted desperately to work with Brando. Impressed by the producers' ability to cast famous actors in respective roles, Warner Bros. decided to distribute the film internationally, rather than simply domestically.

Sets were then being initiated in Rome, Italy, as well as having flying tests experimented. Brando however, could not go to Rome as there was still a warrant out for his arrest due to the sexual obscenity of his role in Last Tango in Paris. It was decided to move the production to England but Hamilton himself was a tax exile from his native country, which only allowed him to spend 60 days or less a year. The director was forced to drop out because of Brando's actions and by this time six million dollars had already been spent on the production. Mark Robson was then in negotiations to direct after Salkind was impressed with his work on Earthquake. However, after viewing Richard Donner's The Omen, Donner was chosen.

== Post-Superman career ==
The Salkinds' last journey into film fantasy was 1985's Santa Claus: The Movie. That same year, DC Comics named Salkind as one of the honorees in the company's 50th anniversary publication Fifty Who Made DC Great for his work on the Superman film franchise.

The Salkinds returned to the Superman mythology again in 1988, this time as a TV series, with Superboy, starring John Haymes Newton in the title role during its first year, Gerard Christopher as the Boy of Steel for the remainder of the show's existence, and Stacy Haiduk as Lana Lang, lasted four seasons, running for 100 episodes. Following the team's last film, Christopher Columbus: The Discovery (1992), Ilya and his then-wife, Jane Chaplin (daughter of Charlie Chaplin) settled in Orlando, Florida, where much of the Superboy series had been filmed. There, Ilya and Jane took a sabbatical and devoted their time to raising their two sons. In 1999, the couple amicably separated.

=== Ilya Salkind Company ===
Returning to Los Angeles in 2003, the producer launched the Ilya Salkind Company in the late summer of that year. The company's first project, Young Alexander the Great, was shot on location in Greece and Egypt, and was released direct-to-DVD in 2010 under the title Born to be Great. The company had several major motion pictures slated for the coming years.

=== Superman retrospectives ===
On the DVD release of Superboy: The Complete First Season in 2006, Salkind appeared in the documentary featurette "Superboy: Getting Off the Ground" and provided audio commentary with series star John Haymes Newton on two episodes. He also appeared in the 2006 television documentary Look, Up in the Sky: The Amazing Story of Superman talking about his time producing the Superman films. He also provided audio commentary along with producer Pierre Spengler for the 2006 DVD releases of Superman: The Movie (Four-Disc Collector's Edition), Superman II (Two-Disc Special Edition), and Superman III (Deluxe Edition).

=== Reported missing ===
Salkind, who was born in Mexico City, traveled south of the border to handle a family property owned by his mother, who died a few years earlier. The 63-year-old was staying at his family's home in Tepoztlán. On February 2, 2011, Salkind's long-time companion Deborah Moore filed a missing persons report with Mexican authorities, Salkind having left his cell phone at his Mexico City estate on January 30, telling his staff that he was going to run errands, and not having been seen since. Family and friends became alarmed when he failed to show up for a dentist's appointment the following day. Investigators on February 3 located Salkind in a local hospital, where he was reported to be under sedation due to being assaulted.

== Personal life ==
Salkind was married in 1976 to Skye Aubrey, with whom he has two children Anastasia and Sebastian. The couple divorced in 1979. He married Patricia Bonnet in 1980. The couple has one child. He later married Jane Chaplin. They have two sons together, and divorced in 1999. For the past twenty years he has lived with Deborah Moore. They have no children and are not married.

== Filmography ==
=== Producer ===
Year	Title	Director
1971	The Light at the Edge of the World	Kevin Billington
1971	Kill! Kill! Kill! Kill!	Romain Gary
1972	Bluebeard	Edward Dmytryk
1973	The Three Musketeers	Richard Lester
1974	The Four Musketeers	Richard Lester
1976	The Twist	Claude Chabrol
1977	The Prince and the Pauper	Richard Fleischer
1978	Superman	Richard Donner
1980	Superman II	Richard Lester
1983	Superman III	Richard Lester
1984	Supergirl	Jeannot Szwarc
1985	Santa Claus: The Movie	Jeannot Szwarc
1988–1992	Superboy	Various
1992	Christopher Columbus: The Discovery	John Glen
2015	Dancing for My Havana	Claudio Del Punta
