= Santa Claus: The Movie =

1985 film by Jeannot Szwarc

- US theatrical release poster by Bob Peak
- Directed by: Jeannot Szwarc
- Screenplay by: David Newman
- Story by: David Newman; Leslie Newman
- Produced by: Pierre Spengler; Ilya Salkind
- Starring: David Huddleston; Dudley Moore; John Lithgow; Judy Cornwell; Burgess Meredith
- Cinematography: Arthur Ibbetson
- Edited by: Peter Hollywood
- Music by: Henry Mancini (score); Leslie Bricusse (lyrics)
- Production companies: Santa Claus Productions Ltd. Calash Corporation N.V.
- Distributed by: Rank Film Distributors (UK); Tri-Star Pictures (US)
- Release date: November 27, 1985
- Running time: 108 minutes
- Countries: United Kingdom; United States
- Language: English
- Budget: $30–50 million
- Box office: $23.7 million

Santa Claus: The Movie (titled onscreen simply as Santa Claus) is a 1985 Christmas fantasy film directed by Jeannot Szwarc and starring David Huddleston, Dudley Moore, John Lithgow, Judy Cornwell and Burgess Meredith. It depicts the origin of Santa Claus (played by Huddleston), and his modern-day adventure to save Patch, one of his elves (Moore) who has been manipulated by B.Z., an unscrupulous toy company executive (Lithgow).

Santa Claus: The Movie was the last major fantasy film produced by the Paris-based father-and-son production team of Alexander and Ilya Salkind, better known as the producers of the 1970s-80s Superman films. It was written by the husband-and-wife duo of David and Leslie Newman, who had also written the Superman films.

Santa Claus: The Movie was released in the United Kingdom by Rank Film Distributors, and in the United States by Tri-Star Pictures on November 27, 1985. The film underperformed at the box-office, grossing $23.7 million on a $30-50 million budget, and received mixed reviews from critics. It has, over time, become a cult classic, especially in the British Isles.

== Plot ==
In the Middle Ages somewhere in northern Europe, a woodcutter named Claus delivers hand-carved toys to the children of his village each Christmas, accompanied by his wife Anya and their reindeer Donner and Blitzen. Upon attempting to cross a forest, they all succumb to the cold when their sleigh is caught in a blizzard and awaken in the North Pole, whose every inhabitant becomes immortal. They are greeted by resident elves, whose leader Dooley tells their coming was prophesied, and that Claus's destiny is to deliver elven-made gifts to all the children of the world.

The following Christmas Eve, Claus is given the title of "Santa Claus" by the ancient elf, who explains the night will last as long as necessary for him to deliver gifts to every child on Earth. He makes the voyage in his sleigh, pulled by Donner, Blitzen and six other reindeer, who are fed hay sprinkled with magical dust which grants them the power of flight. As the centuries pass, the mythology and traditions deepen surrounding the mysterious Christmas benefactor, Santa Claus. He also created the Naughty or Nice list due to a child writing a letter to Santa that her brother was cruel to her and her cat and Mrs. Claus believes naughty kids don't deserve any presents.

By the late 20th century, Santa is exhausted by his ever-increasing workload and Anya suggests he enlist an assistant. Santa selects Patch, an industrious inventor with ideas for modernization, who creates a machine which increases productivity of toys through automation. While delivering toys in New York City, Santa befriends a homeless orphan boy named Joe, whom he lets ride with him in the sleigh. After attempting and failing a maneuver dubbed the "Super Duper Looper", Santa returns Joe and meets a wealthy orphan girl named Cornelia, who befriends Joe.

When Patch's mass-produced toys all malfunction, he resigns as Santa's assistant and leaves the North Pole in shame. He ends up in New York, where Cornelia's unscrupulous step-uncle B.Z. (He has been on Santa's naughty list ever since he was a child). is facing federally mandated shutdown of his toy company for intentionally producing unsafe toys. Seeking to redeem himself, Patch approaches B.Z. with his idea for lollipops laced with the magic flight dust, which will enable consumers to fly temporarily. Realizing the potential, B.Z. has Patch strengthen the formula and distribute them from a flying car on Christmas Eve. The lollipops prove more popular than Santa's toys, leaving Santa feeling disheartened.

After the success of Patch's lollipops, B.Z. begins planning "Christmas II" on March 25, where Patch will this time distribute candy canes laced with magic flight dust. However, Cornelia and Joe overhear the discovery that candy canes will explode when exposed to heat, and that instead of rectifying the issue, B.Z. intends to flee to Brazil, leaving Patch to take the fall for the product liability. B.Z. discovers the two eavesdropping and captures Joe; in desperation, Cornelia writes a letter to Santa, who breaks his history of December-only flights and travels to New York in January to help. Cornelia alerts the police to B.Z., who escapes arrest by eating several magic candy canes at once and leaping from a window in an attempt to fly. However, he is instead propelled upwards into the sky, before vanishing into space forever.

Patch discovers Joe tied up and frees him. Seeing a wood carving resembling Patch that Santa made for Joe, Patch realizes Santa misses him and he and Joe head for the North Pole in the flying car, with the candy canes on board. Realizing Patch and Joe are in danger, Santa and Cornelia pursue them in the sleigh. Santa sees the candy canes are reaching critical levels, but they cannot catch up in time to rescue them. Santa realizes the only way to save them in time is to successfully perform the "Super Duper Looper"; the reindeer are initially scared, but determined to save Patch and Joe, perform the dive and catch them as they fall from the exploding car. Patch returns to the North Pole, where Santa lets Joe and Cornelia live with him in the workshop.

== Cast ==
- David Huddleston as Santa Claus
- Dudley Moore as Patch
- John Lithgow as B.Z.
- Burgess Meredith as the Ancient Elf
- Judy Cornwell as Anya
- Jeffrey Kramer as Towzer
- Christian L. Fitzpatrick as Joe
- Carrie Kei Heim as Cornelia
- John Barrard as Dooley
- Anthony O'Donnell as Puffy
- Aimée Delamain as A Storyteller in Claus' village
- Dorothea Phillips as Miss Tucker, Cornelia's nanny
- John Hallam as Grizzard, B.Z.'s chauffeur
- Judith Morse as Miss Abruzzi, who works for B.Z.
- Jerry Harte as a Senate Chairman
- Ian Wise as Salvation Army Bandsman in Central Park snow globe scene

Additional elves were played by Melvyn Hayes, Don Estelle, Tim Stern, Peter O'Farrell and Christopher Ryan, as Goober, Groot, Boog, Honka, Vout and Goobler respectively. Other minor roles were played by Paul Aspland, Sally Granfield and Michael Drew as reporters; Walter Goodman as a street corner Santa; John Cassady as a wino; and Ronald Fernee and Michael Ross as policemen.

== Production ==
=== Development ===
Conceived by Ilya Salkind in the wake of the apparently waning critical and U.S. box office success of 1983's Superman III and its immediate follow-up, 1984's Supergirl, Santa Claus: The Movie was directed by Supergirl director Jeannot Szwarc, from a story by David and Leslie Newman (though David Newman took sole screenplay credit). Pierre Spengler, Salkin's longtime partner and a longtime collaborator of both Ilya and Alexander Salkind, joined as the project's producer.

John Carpenter was originally offered the chance to direct, but also wanted a say in the writing, musical score, and final cut of the film. Carpenter's original choice for the role of Santa Claus was Brian Dennehy. Szwarc, however, felt that he needed an actor with more warmth than Dennehy and Carpenter's demands were too much. Lewis Gilbert was another early choice for director but, despite initial interest, he could not agree with the Salkinds over certain aspects of the script. Robert Wise was also offered the chance to direct, but had a different approach to the story. Guy Hamilton, who'd had to withdraw from directing Superman: The Movie in 1976, lobbied hard for the chance to direct the film, but only on the condition that it be shot either in Los Angeles, Vancouver, or Rome. Ultimately, the Salkinds chose Szwarc because of their excellent working relationship on Supergirl.

=== Casting ===
Dudley Moore was the Salkinds' top choice to play the lead elf in the film, Ilya Salkind having remembered a scene in Arthur in which Linda Marolla (Liza Minnelli) asks Arthur Bach (Moore) if he is Santa's Little Helper. Moore was attached to the project early on, and had a say in both scripting and choice of director. David Newman's first script draft named Moore's character Ollie, but Moore decided that the name should be changed to Patch, which was the nickname of his young son, Patrick. Moore had briefly been considered to play the role of Mister Mxyzptlk in the Salkinds' aborted original script for Superman III, and for the role of Nigel in Supergirl. He turned down that role, but suggested his longtime friend and comic partner Peter Cook for the part.

Ilya Salkind wanted an American actor to portray Santa Claus because he felt that the film focused on a primary piece of Americana in much the same way that Superman: The Movie had. Szwarc screen-tested such actors as David White (who, being in his late 60s, was considered too old for the role) and Moore's Arthur co-star Barney Martin. For a while, Ilya Salkind actively pursued Carroll O'Connor for the role before Szwarc showed him David Huddleston's screen-test, which won Salkind over.

For the role of B.Z., the producers wanted a star with a similar stature to Gene Hackman when he had played Lex Luthor in Superman: The Movie. To this end, they offered the role to Harrison Ford who turned them down. They made offers to Dustin Hoffman, Burt Reynolds and Johnny Carson, each of whom also turned the part down. Eventually, John Lithgow was settled on after Ilya Salkind watched Terms of Endearment and realized that he had a Grinch-type look to him.

The role of the Ancient Elf was written with James Cagney in mind. Though he liked the film's overall idea, Cagney, at 84, turned the role down due to being too weakened by age to perform it. Fred Astaire was considered, but when this eventually came to nothing, Dudley Moore suggested his friend Burgess Meredith for the role, which he in the end won. At the time of the film's announcement in mid-1983, the British Press carried reports that diminutive actors such as David Jason, Patrick Troughton and Norman Wisdom would be cast alongside Moore as fellow elves, but none of them were.

=== Filming ===
Santa Claus: The Movie was filmed in Buckinghamshire, England at Pinewood Studios, between August and November 1984. The film was photographed by Arthur Ibbetson, whose credits included Willy Wonka & the Chocolate Factory (1971). Santa Claus: The Movie was his final feature film. Serving as film editor was Peter Hollywood. The production was designed by Anthony Pratt, with costume design concepts by Bob Ringwood. The visual effects unit, as well as several of the production staff, were Salkind stalwarts from the Superman films: Derek Meddings, director of visual and miniature effects; Roy Field, optical visual effects supervisor; and David Lane, flying and second unit director.

== Reception ==
=== Box office ===
Box Office Mojo lists the film's total United States box office gross as $23,717,291, less than its $30–50 million production budget. The film was however highly popular in the UK, grossing £5,073,000. The film also would go on to become the most repeated Christmas film ever shown on British television.

=== Critical response ===
Santa Claus: The Movie received mostly negative reviews upon release, with a rating of 22% on Rotten Tomatoes, from the 23 reviews counted.

Chicago Sun-Times critic Roger Ebert offered a mixed review of 2.5 stars out of 4. He noted some positive points to the film, writing how it "does an interesting job of visualizing Santa's workshop" and Santa's elves. He also praised the film's special effects, particularly the New York City fly-over sequence involving Santa. Ebert also had some praise for Lithgow's character but also said "the villain is not drawn big enough". He said young children would probably like most of the film, but older children and adults are "likely to find a lot of it a little thin".

Vincent Canby of The New York Times was less positive than Ebert, calling the production "elaborate and tacky". He described the film as having "the manner of a listless musical without any production numbers". Unlike Ebert, he offered little praise for the film's production design. Canby quipped that "Santa's workshop must be the world's largest purchaser of low-grade plywood" and that the flyover sequences with Santa "aren't great". The only praise he had for the film's acting was for John Lithgow, who Canby wrote "(gave) the film's only remotely stylish performance". A more recent review by William Mager for the BBC echoed Canby and Ebert's comments.

In his book Have Yourself a Movie Little Christmas, critic Alonso Duralde lists Santa Claus: The Movie in his chapter of worst Christmas films ever. His reasons include weak plot, garish production design, blatant product placement (particularly for McDonald's, though Coke and Pabst Blue Ribbon are also prominent), and scenery-chewing overacting on the part of Lithgow. Duralde ultimately concludes that the film is "a train-wreck of a Christmas film that's so very wrong that you won't be able to tear yourself away from it".

John Lithgow, in a 2019 interview, said that Santa Claus was "one of the tackiest movies I've ever been in. It seemed cheesy and it certainly never stuck...except in England. It is huge over there. I wish I had a nickel for every Englishman who's told me [it's their favorite film]. In England, that's half of what I'm known for".

== Soundtrack ==
The soundtrack score was composed and conducted by Henry Mancini, composer of the themes from The Pink Panther and Peter Gunn, with veteran lyricist and screenwriter Leslie Bricusse contributing five original songs. The song "It's Christmas (All Over the World)" was written by Bill House and John Hobbs with Freddie Mercury in mind. While it is known that Mercury recorded a demo for the House/Hobbs song at Pinewood Studios, he was never to make a full commitment to the project, as he and his Queen bandmates had already committed themselves to the Highlander soundtrack. In the end, Mercury turned down the project, stating that he felt that Queen had become overcrowded with requests to work on film soundtracks; as a result, Sheena Easton was ultimately chosen to record the tune. As mentioned on the DVD commentary of the film by Jeannot Szwarc, Paul McCartney was asked to compose songs for the film. It is unknown why he did not do so in the end.

Track listing

1. "Main Title: Every Christmas Eve^{1} and Santa's Theme (Giving)" (Henry Mancini/Leslie Bricusse)
2. "Arrival of the Elves" (Mancini)
3. "Making Toys" (Mancini/Bricusse)^{2}
4. "Christmas Rhapsody: Deck the Halls/Joy to the World/Hark! The Herald Angels Sing/12 Days of Christmas/O Tannenbaum/The First Noel/Silent Night"
5. "It's Christmas Again" (Mancini/Bricusse)^{2}
6. "March of the Elves" (Mancini)
7. "Patch, Natch!" (Mancini/Bricusse)^{3}
8. "It's Christmas (All Over The World)" (Bill House, John Hobbs)^{5}
9. "Shouldn't Do That" (Nick Beggs, Stuart Croxford, Neal Askew, Steve Askew)^{4}
10. "Sleigh Ride over Manhattan" (Mancini)
11. "Sad Patch" (Mancini)
12. "Patch Versus Santa" (Mancini)
13. "Thank You, Santa" (Mancini/Bricusse)^{2}

^{1}Sung by Aled Jones.
^{2}Performed by the Ambrosian Children's Choir.
^{3}Performed by the Ambrosian Singers.
^{4}Produced by Ken Scott and performed by Kaja.
^{5}Produced by Keith Olsen for Pogologo Corporation, and performed by Sheena Easton.

The soundtrack was originally released on record and cassette by EMI America Records in 1985. Soon after, it went out of print and remained unavailable until 2009 when it was released on CD as a limited run of 1000 copies which sold out immediately upon release. This production suffered from several issues, most notably a master which had been subjected to heavy noise reduction resulting in a loss of sound quality. Additionally, the left & right channels had been erroneously flipped, a superficial re-edit had been performed on "It's Christmas (All Over the World)", and the song "Shouldn't Do That" by Kaja (Kajagoogoo) had been omitted due to licensing issues. In 2012 a deluxe three-disc set, including remastered tracks, outtakes and alternate versions and a 32-page booklet, was released.

== Comic book adaptation ==
Marvel Comics published a comic book adaptation of the film by writer Sid Jacobson and artist Frank Springer in Marvel Super Special #39.

== See also ==
- Santa Claus in film
- List of Christmas films
