= Alexander Salkind =

Polish born-French film producer (1921–97)

- Born: 2 June 1921; Free City of Danzig (Note: Nowadays Gdańsk, Poland)
- Died: 8 March 1997 (aged 75); Neuilly-sur-Seine, France
- Occupation: Film producer
- Years active: 1941–1993
- Spouse: Berta Domínguez (m. 1946)
- Children: Ilya Salkind

Alexander Salkind (/ˈsælkaɪnd/; 2 June 1921 – 8 March 1997) was a French film producer, the second of three generations of successful international producers.

== Life and career ==
Salkind was born in the Free City of Danzig to Russian Jewish parents, Maria and Mikhail Salkind (later Miguel Salkind). His family moved to France, where his father worked as a film producer. Following in his father's footsteps, he produced French films and others in Europe and Hollywood: Austerlitz (1960) directed by Abel Gance, Kafka's The Trial (1962) directed by Orson Welles, and 1978's Superman starring Christopher Reeve and Margot Kidder. Salkind's double production, The Three Musketeers (1973), closely followed by The Four Musketeers (1974), led the Screen Actors Guild to issue what became known as the "Salkind Clause", which is intended to guarantee that an acting contract for one film cannot be extended into two films without the consent of the actor. In 1985, DC Comics named Salkind as one of the honorees in the company's 50th anniversary publication Fifty Who Made DC Great for his work on the Superman film franchise.

Alexander Salkind died in Neuilly-sur-Seine in 1997 and was buried in the Cimetière de Bagneux in the Parisian suburb of Montrouge.

Salkind's son, Ilya Salkind (b. 1947), is also a film producer.

== Filmography ==
- Marina (1945 – producer)
- Soltera y con Gemelos (1945 – producer)
- Sinfonia de una vida (1946 – producer; also known as The Symphony of Life)
- Il moderno Barba Azul (A Modern Bluebeard) (1946 – producer; released in the U.S. as Boom to the Moon)
- Black Jack (1950 – co-producer; also known as Captain Black Jack)
- The Daughter of the Regiment (1953 – producer; released in Italy as La figlia del Reggimento, and in the U.S. as The Daughter of the Regiment)
- Mon coquin de père (1958 – producer; released in Italy as A Parigi in vacanza, and worldwide as My Darned Father)
- Austerlitz (1960 – producer; released in the U.S. as The Battle of Austerlitz, and in Italy as Napoleone ad Austerlitz or La Battaglia di Austerlitz)
- Romulus and the Sabines (1961 – producer; released in France as L'Enlevement des Sabines, and in Latin America as El Rapto de las Sabinas)
- The Trial (Le Procès) (1962 – producer, uncredited; released in West Germany as Der Prozess, and in Italy as Il Processo)
- Ballad in Blue (1965 – producer; also known as Blues for Lovers)
- Cervantes (1967 – producer; released in the U.S. as The Life of Cervantes or Young Rebel, in France as Les Aventures Extraordinaires de Cervantes, and in Italy as Le Avventure e Gli Amori di Cervantes)
- Hot Line (1967 – producer; released in France as Le Rouble à deux faces)
- The Light at the Edge of the World (1971 – presenter, executive producer)
- Kill! (1971 – producer/presenter; released in the U.S. as Kill, Kill, Kill!, in Spain as Kill: Matar, and in France as Police Magnum)
- Bluebeard (1972 – producer/presenter; released in Italy as Barbablu, in West Germany as Blaubart, and in France as Barbe-bleue)
- The Three Musketeers (1973 – producer/presenter; also known as The Queen's Diamonds)
- The Four Musketeers (1974 – producer/presenter; also known as Milady's Revenge or The Revenge of Milady)
- Folies bourgeoises (1976 – producer/presenter; released in the U.S. as The Twist, in West Germany as Die Verruckten Reichen, and in Italy as Pazzi Borghesi)
- Crossed Swords (1978 – presenter; also known as The Prince and the Pauper)
- Superman: The Movie (1978 – presenter)
- Superman II (1980 – presenter; released in the U.S. in 1981)
- Superman III (1983 – presenter)
- Where Is Parsifal? (1983 – presenter, uncredited)
- Supergirl (1984 – presenter)
- Santa Claus: The Movie (1985 – presenter)
- The Rainbow Thief (1990 – executive producer, uncredited)
- Christopher Columbus: The Discovery (1992 – presenter)
- Superman II: The Richard Donner Cut (2006 – presenter)
