= Music of Superman =

Music in works featuring the character Superman

The various film and theatre appearances of the Superman character have been accompanied by musical scores.

== Superman ==
The score for the 1978 film Superman, composed and conducted by John Williams, was performed by the London Symphony Orchestra, with John Georgiadis as concertmaster. Recording took place on July 6, 7, 10, 11, 13, 14; September 9–11; October 6 (Irvine Arditti, concertmaster), 15, 24, 31 (Richard Studt, concertmaster), and November 4, 1978, at the Anvil Studios in Denham, Bucks, England. Source music was recorded on July 17. The recording engineer was Eric Tomlinson, assisted by Alan Snelling. The score was orchestrated by Williams, Herbert W. Spencer, Alexander Courage, Angela Morley and Arthur Morton. The music editor was Bob Hathaway, assisted by Ken Ross.

Williams's "Superman Theme", which is first heard during the opening credits to the film Superman, has been reused (with varying arrangements) as the opening music for every Superman film except for Superman III, in which Ken Thorne employed a lighthearted, somewhat comical cue to represent "the streets of Metropolis". It is also referenced in Jerry Goldsmith's score to the 1984 film Supergirl during a scene in which the title character sees a poster of Superman.

In the 2017 film Justice League, Danny Elfman reused Williams's Superman theme, as well as his themes from Tim Burton's Batman and Batman Returns for the new incarnation of the character. Blake Neely, the composer for the Arrowverse crossover "Crisis on Infinite Earths", incorporated the march theme and "Can You Read My Mind?" with Brandon Routh reprising his role as the Superman of Earth-96.

In the 2019 film Shazam!, a rendition of Williams's Superman theme (composed by Benjamin Wallfisch) was played during Superman's appearance at the end of the film.

In the 2022 film Black Adam, a rendition of Williams's Superman theme (composed by Lorne Balfe) was heard in a mid-credit scene featuring actor Henry Cavill as Superman, rather than Hans Zimmer's Man of Steel theme. Cavill noted that Williams's theme is immediately recognizable to audiences around the world.

A reimagined version of Williams's theme was used to promote James Gunn's 2025 film Superman, the first film of the DC Universe. Gunn later confirmed that the theme would also be included in John Murphy and David Fleming's score of the film itself, as a tribute to when he first heard it as a child.

=== Leitmotifs ===
- "Superman Fanfare" is a short harmonic-based motif, played just before the "Main Theme", or as a standalone when Superman appears in a quick-cut on-screen. It is also restated many times in the "Superman March".
- "Superman March" or "Superman Main Theme" is used over opening and closing credits. It consists of two sections, an "A" theme which is the main part of the melody and a "B" theme which is a bit lighter in mood and which often connects the "March" to the "Fanfare".
- "Can You Read My Mind" or the soaring "Love Theme" is typically used when Lois and Superman (or sometimes Clark) find themselves alone together. A portion of this theme is introduced as an interlude in the midst of the "Superman March". Lyrics for the melody were written by longtime John Williams collaborator Leslie Bricusse, for the purpose of having a song during the film's extended "flying sequence". Margot Kidder, who plays Lois Lane, speaks the lyrics in the film, but cover versions of the song have been recorded by Maureen McGovern, Shirley Bassey and others.
- "Krypton fanfare" is used as the viewer zooms in on Krypton, and again with the self-construction of the Fortress of Solitude.
- "Krypton crystal" motif or the "Secondary Krypton" motif is a mysterious-sounding theme associated with the physicality of the planet Krypton, both the crystals sent by Jor-El to Earth with his son and the radioactive kryptonite which is deadly to Superman.
- "Personal" motif is a melody related to the duality of Superman and Clark Kent which musically connects the "Fanfare" to the "Love Theme".
- "Smallville" or "Leaving Home Theme" is an Coplandesque, Americana melody used during the Smallville sequences which in some ways is a simpler or undeveloped version of the March's "A" theme. It bears a similarity to a theme written by John Williams for the 1972 John Wayne western film The Cowboys.
- "The March of the Villains" or "Lex Luthor theme" is a comedic Prokofiev-inspired march associated with the villain Lex Luthor and his henchman Otis.

=== Source music ===
A selection of existing songs were featured in the 1978 film Superman, not included on any version of the soundtrack albums, but readily available elsewhere:

- "Rock Around the Clock", by Bill Haley & His Comets, was playing on the radio of the "Woodie" being driven by some of Clark Kent's high school classmates. The song seems out of context, as it was presumably 1964 at that point in the narrative, yet this song debuted in 1955. It is later established that Kal-El's ship crashed in 1951, and in Superman III it is established that Clark graduates high school in 1965. However, coincidentally (or not) the song introduces Glenn Ford's final scene in the film. Ford starred in the 1955 film Blackboard Jungle, in which that song was prominently featured. Incidentally, this song was not used in the television versions of the film, which instead used an original John Williams source cue composed and recorded for the film, called "Kansas Kids".
- "Only You", by The Platters, is playing on the teenage Clark's bedside radio when he is awakened by the sound that leads him to the discovery of his spacecraft beneath the barn. This song was also not heard in the television cuts, which instead used only radio static.
- Ten seconds of Supertramp's 1977 song, "Give a Little Bit" from the album Even in the Quietest Moments, were heard on Lois Lane's car radio just prior to the climactic earthquake scene. The song was a then-recent hit. Its appearance in the film seems to be for no obvious thematic reason, though there could be a subtle message or two: The group having "Super" in its name; and the words heard on-screen, "Give a little bit... [I'll] give a little bit of my life for you".

Source music written for the film: A Hawaiian-themed cue called "Luthor's Luau", heard in the background in Lex Luthor's secret hideaway the day after Superman's debut around the city was composed by John Williams, who also wrote additional pieces of source music that were not used in the film. In some cases these were replaced by the existing songs listed above. Some of Williams' versions were used in the extended television broadcast versions of the film in place of these.

=== Concert suites ===
These are regularly performed in symphony and pops concerts, including those by composer John Williams, and have also been featured in re-recordings for various CD compilations.

- "The March of the Villains" (Superman).
- "Love Theme from Superman" (Superman).
- "Theme from Superman" (Superman). This suite includes "Superman Fanfare", "Superman March" and the "Love Theme".

=== Soundtrack releases ===
==== Warner Bros. Records ====
December 20, 1978: 2-LP set from Warner Bros. Records.

This album was released on CD in 1987 and is still in print, but it is missing the tracks "Growing Up" and "Lex Luthor's Lair". The Japanese issue, which was released in 1990, presents the full program, but is out of print and rare.

Side 1
| No. | Title | Length |
|---|---|---|
| 1. | "Theme from Superman (Main Title)" | 4:24 |
| 2. | "The Planet Krypton" | 4:45 |
| 3. | "Destruction of Krypton" | 5:58 |
| 4. | "The Trip to Earth" | 2:23 |
| 5. | "Growing Up" | 2:34 |

Side 2
| No. | Title | Length |
|---|---|---|
| 1. | "Love Theme from Superman" | 5:00 |
| 2. | "Leaving Home" | 4:48 |
| 3. | "The Fortress of Solitude" | 8:29 |

Side 3
| No. | Title | Length |
|---|---|---|
| 1. | "The Flying Sequence / Can You Read My Mind (vocal by Margot Kidder)" | 8:10 |
| 2. | "Super Rescues" | 3:24 |
| 3. | "Lex Luthor's Lair" | 2:52 |
| 4. | "Superfeats" | 5:00 |

Side 4
| No. | Title | Length |
|---|---|---|
| 1. | "The March of the Villains" | 3:33 |
| 2. | "Chasing Rockets" | 7:33 |
| 3. | "Turning Back The World" | 2:01 |
| 4. | "End Title" | 6:24 |

==== Varèse Sarabande re-recording ====
1998: 2-CD set from Varèse Sarabande Records.

This release is a re-recording of Williams' score, conducted by John Debney and performed by the Royal Scottish National Orchestra, including the first release of additional music from the film in any form. As detailed in the liner notes, the project was hampered when it was discovered that the existing scores and parts for the Superman: The Movie score had been lost. When extensive efforts to locate them failed, a team of orchestrators reconstructed the music from John Williams' 8-12 stave composer sketches; thus there are subtle differences which may be noted in a number of the cues when compared to their original counterparts.

The tempo of the cues in this re-recording are generally rather slower than in the original recording, possibly because the recording was made in the highly resonant acoustic of Glasgow City Hall.

Disc 1
| No. | Title | Length |
|---|---|---|
| 1. | "Prologue & Main Title" | 5:31 |
| 2. | "The Planet Krypton" | 4:35 |
| 3. | "Destruction of Krypton" | 5:27 |
| 4. | "The Trip to Earth" | 2:38 |
| 5. | "Growing Up" | 2:05 |
| 6. | "Jonathan's Death" | 4:09 |
| 7. | "Leaving Home" | 4:46 |
| 8. | "The Fortress of Solitude" | 8:22 |

Disc 2
| No. | Title | Length |
|---|---|---|
| 1. | "Helicopter Rescue" | 6:16 |
| 2. | "The Penthouse" | 1:50 |
| 3. | "The Flying Sequence" | 4:16 |
| 4. | "The Truck Convoy" | 1:54 |
| 5. | "To The Lair" | 2:18 |
| 6. | "March of the Villains" | 3:56 |
| 7. | "Chasing Rockets" | 5:12 |
| 8. | "Pushing Boulders" | 2:24 |
| 9. | "Flying to Lois" | 2:58 |
| 10. | "Turning Back The World" | 2:01 |
| 11. | "The Prison Yard and End Title" | 6:27 |
| 12. | "Love Theme from Superman" | 5:01 |

==== Rhino Records ====
February 15, 2000: 2-CD set from Rhino Records.

This release combines the master for the original album with what were believed at the time to be the only surviving elements to reconstruct the full length of the original Williams recording. This release went out of print in 2005, but may still be available online through many internet music services.

Disc 1
| No. | Title | Length |
|---|---|---|
| 1. | "Prologue and Main Title" | 5:29 |
| 2. | "The Planet Krypton" | 6:39 |
| 3. | "Destruction of Krypton" | 7:52 |
| 4. | "Star Ship Escapes" | 2:21 |
| 5. | "The Trip to Earth" | 2:28 |
| 6. | "Growing Up" | 2:34 |
| 7. | "Death of Jonathan Kent" | 3:27 |
| 8. | "Leaving Home" | 4:49 |
| 9. | "The Fortress of Solitude" | 9:17 |
| 10. | "Welcome to Metropolis" | 2:11 |
| 11. | "Lex Luthor's Lair" | 2:33 |
| 12. | "The Big Rescue" | 5:55 |
| 13. | "Super Crime Fighter" | 3:20 |
| 14. | "Super Rescues" | 2:14 |
| 15. | "Luthor's Luau" (source music) | 2:48 |
| 16. | "The Planet Krypton" (alternate) | 4:24 |
| 17. | "Main Title March" (alternate) | 4:38 |

Disc 2
| No. | Title | Length |
|---|---|---|
| 1. | "Superman March" (alternate) | 3:48 |
| 2. | "The March of the Villains" | 3:36 |
| 3. | "The Terrace" | 1:36 |
| 4. | "The Flying Sequence" | 8:12 |
| 5. | "Lois and Clark" | 0:50 |
| 6. | "Crime of the Century" | 3:24 |
| 7. | "Sonic Greeting" | 2:21 |
| 8. | "Misguided Missiles and Kryptonite" | 3:26 |
| 9. | "Chasing Rockets" | 4:56 |
| 10. | "Super Feats" | 4:53 |
| 11. | "Super Dam and Finding Lois" | 5:11 |
| 12. | "Turning Back the World" | 2:06 |
| 13. | "Finale and End Title March" | 5:42 |
| 14. | "Love Theme from Superman" | 5:06 |
| 15. | "Can You Read My Mind" (alternate) (performed by Margot Kidder) | 2:56 |
| 16. | "The Flying Sequence / Can You Read My Mind" (album version) (performed by Margot Kidder) | 8:12 |
| 17. | "Can You Read My Mind" (alternate) (instrumental) | 2:56 |
| 18. | "Theme from Superman" (concert version) | 4:24 |

==== Film Score Monthly ====
February 29, 2008: part of Superman: The Music (1978-1988) 8-CD set from Film Score Monthly.

This release restores the complete score from newly discovered high quality original masters and includes previously unreleased material. Discs 1 and 2 of this 8 disc set present music from the film. Additional material is presented on disc 8.

Disc 1
| No. | Title | Length |
|---|---|---|
| 1. | "Theme From Superman" | 4:23 |
| 2. | "Prelude and Main Title" | 5:02 |
| 3. | "The Planet Krypton" | 6:36 |
| 4. | "Destruction of Krypton" | 7:53 |
| 5. | "The Kryptonquake" | 2:24 |
| 6. | "The Trip to Earth" | 2:30 |
| 7. | "Growing Up" | 2:32 |
| 8. | "Jonathan's Death" | 3:23 |
| 9. | "Leaving Home" | 4:48 |
| 10. | "The Fortress of Solitude" | 9:18 |
| 11. | "The Mugger" | 2:07 |
| 12. | "Lex Luthor's Lair" | 4:48 |
| 13. | "Helicopter Sequence" | 5:55 |
| 14. | "The Burglar Sequence / Chasing Crooks" | 3:18 |
| 15. | "Super Rescues" | 2:16 |
| 16. | "The Penthouse" | 1:31 |
| 17. | "The Flying Sequence" | 8:10 |
| 18. | "Clark Loses His Nerve" | 0:46 |

Disc 2
| No. | Title | Length |
|---|---|---|
| 1. | "The March of the Villains" | 3:35 |
| 2. | "The Truck Convoy / Miss Teschmacher Helps" | 3:24 |
| 3. | "To the Lair" | 2:18 |
| 4. | "Trajectory Malfunction / Luthor's Lethal Weapon" | 3:24 |
| 5. | "Chasing Rockets" | 4:57 |
| 6. | "Superfeats" | 4:54 |
| 7. | "Pushing Boulders / Flying to Lois" | 5:21 |
| 8. | "Turning Back the World" | 2:03 |
| 9. | "The Prison Yard / End Title" | 6:37 |
| 10. | "Love Theme from Superman" | 4:58 |
| 11. | "Prelude and Main Title (original version)" | 3:46 |
| 12. | "The Planet Krypton (alternate)" | 3:16 |
| 13. | "The Dome Opens (alternate)" | 2:30 |
| 14. | "The Mugger (alternate)" | 1:24 |
| 15. | "I Can Fly (Flying sequence segment)" | 2:01 |
| 16. | "Can You Read My Mind (film version)" | 3:02 |
| 17. | "Trajectory Malfunction (alternate)" | 1:01 |
| 18. | "Turning Back the World (alternate)" | 2:16 |
| 19. | "The Prison Yard / End Title (film version)" | 5:44 |

Disc 8
| No. | Title | Length |
|---|---|---|
| 1. | "Prelude and Main Title (film version)" | 5:19 |
| 2. | "The Flying Sequence (album version)" | 8:11 |
| 3. | "Can You Read My Mind (original version)" | 2:51 |
| 4. | "Can You Read My Mind (non-vocal version)" | 3:02 |
| 5. | "Kansas High School (source)" | 1:56 |
| 6. | "Kansas Kids (source)" | 1:49 |
| 7. | "Lois Car Radio (source)" | 2:02 |
| 8. | "Luthor's Luau (source)" | 2:43 |

==== La-La Land ====
February 22, 2019: 3-CD set from La-La Land Records.

For the 40th anniversary of the film's release, La-La Land Records released this 3-CD version of the complete score. In the intervening years between the release of the Film Score Monthly 8-CD set and this release, the original 24-track tapes from the recording sessions had been found, with La-La Land Records using these tapes as the source of the remaster. The result is increased dynamic range compared to previous releases. In addition, a new alternate version of "The Fortress of Solitude" was included on Disc 2 and a reconstructed and remastered version of the original album on Disc 3.

Unlike the prior Rhino Records release, this version of the soundtrack did not include any of the source music cues. Those cues were made available in La-La Land Records' 2018 combined release of Superman II and III, on Disc 2.

Disc 1
| No. | Title | Length |
|---|---|---|
| 1. | "Prelude and Main Title" | 5:06 |
| 2. | "The Planet Krypton and the Dome Opens" | 6:39 |
| 3. | "Destruction of Krypton (Extended Version)" | 7:57 |
| 4. | "The Kryptonquake" | 2:27 |
| 5. | "The Trip to Earth" | 2:33 |
| 6. | "The Crash Site" | 0:39 |
| 7. | "Growing Up" | 2:01 |
| 8. | "Jonathan's Death" | 3:27 |
| 9. | "Leaving Home" | 4:52 |
| 10. | "The Fortress of Solitude (Extended Version)" | 9:22 |
| 11. | "The Mugger" | 2:11 |
| 12. | "Lex Luthor's Lair (Extended Version)" | 4:54 |
| 13. | "The Helicopter Sequence" | 5:59 |
| 14. | "The Burglar Sequence and Chasing Crooks" | 3:21 |
| 15. | "Cat Rescue and Air Force One" | 2:17 |
| 16. | "The Penthouse" | 1:35 |
| 17. | "The Flying Sequence" | 8:12 |
| 18. | "Clark Loses His Nerve" | 0:51 |

Disc 2
| No. | Title | Length |
|---|---|---|
| 1. | "The March of the Villains" | 3:37 |
| 2. | "The Truck Convoy Sequence" | 3:27 |
| 3. | "To the Lair" | 2:21 |
| 4. | "Trajectory Malfunction" | 1:21 |
| 5. | "Luthor's Lethal Weapon" | 2:13 |
| 6. | "Superman Rescued and Chasing Rockets" | 5:01 |
| 7. | "Golden Gate Bridge and the Rescue of Jimmy" | 4:56 |
| 8. | "Pushing Boulders and Flying to Lois" | 5:26 |
| 9. | "Turning Back the World" | 2:08 |
| 10. | "The Prison Yard and End Title" | 6:41 |
| 11. | "Love Theme from Superman" | 5:03 |
| 12. | "Prelude and Main Title (Alternate)" | 3:49 |
| 13. | "The Planet Krypton (Alternate Segment)" | 3:18 |
| 14. | "The Dome Opens (Alternate)" | 2:31 |
| 15. | "The Fortress of Solitude (Alternate Segment)" | 4:12 |
| 16. | "The Mugger (Alternate)" | 1:29 |
| 17. | "Prelude and Main Title (Film Version)" | 5:23 |
| 18. | "I Can Fly (Flying Sequence Alternate Segment)" | 2:15 |
| 19. | "Can You Read My Mind (Film Version)" | 3:04 |
| 20. | "Trajectory Malfunction (Alternate)" | 1:04 |
| 21. | "Turning Back the World (Extended Version)" | 2:20 |
| 22. | "The Prison Yard and End Title (Film Version)" | 5:48 |

Disc 3
| No. | Title | Length |
|---|---|---|
| 1. | "Theme from Superman (Main Title)" | 4:29 |
| 2. | "The Planet Krypton" | 4:49 |
| 3. | "Destruction of Krypton" | 6:03 |
| 4. | "The Trip to Earth" | 2:28 |
| 5. | "Growing Up" | 1:56 |
| 6. | "Love Theme from Superman" | 5:02 |
| 7. | "Leaving Home" | 4:52 |
| 8. | "The Fortress of Solitude" | 8:32 |
| 9. | "The Flying Sequence / Can You Read My Mind" | 8:14 |
| 10. | "Super Rescues" | 3:27 |
| 11. | "Lex Luthor's Lair" | 2:37 |
| 12. | "Superfeats" | 5:04 |
| 13. | "The March of the Villains" | 3:37 |
| 14. | "Chasing Rockets" | 7:37 |
| 15. | "Turning Back The World" | 2:06 |
| 16. | "End Title" | 6:36 |

Disc 2 (Superman II/III)
| No. | Title | Length |
|---|---|---|
| 6. | "Can You Read My Mind (Instrumental No. 1)" | 3:11 |
| 7. | "Sunday Meeting" | 1:30 |
| 8. | "Kansas High School" | 1:47 |
| 9. | "Kansas Kids" | 1:30 |
| 10. | "Late Night Country Music" | 0:53 |
| 11. | "Luthor's Luau" | 2:50 |
| 12. | "Lois' Pad" | 1:17 |
| 13. | "Desert Riff" | 0:23 |
| 14. | "Lois Car Radio" | 1:56 |
| 15. | "Kids on the Bus" | 1:31 |
| 16. | "Can You Read My Mind (Instrumental No. 2)" | 2:55 |

== Superman II ==
The score was composed, orchestrated and conducted by Ken Thorne (from original material composed by John Williams). Because of budget restrictions, the score was recorded by an orchestra of contract players rather than the London Symphony Orchestra. Recording took place on March 25–27, 29; April 17, 18, 25; and May 2, 1980, at CTS Studios (The Music Centre) in Wembley, Middlesex, England. The recording engineer was John Richards, assisted by Tim Pennington and James Abramson, and the music editor was Bob Hathaway.

=== Leitmotifs ===
Composer/arranger Ken Thorne was mandated to reuse the first film's themes for Superman II. He based the music for the Kryptonian villains on the Williams material associated with Krypton and the Fortress of Solitude. He also added a descending three-note motif for the villains and a briefly heard ominous melody associated with General Zod.

=== Source music ===
- "Pick up the Pieces", by Average White Band, can be heard in the East Houston sequence. This replaced a piece called "East Houston Café" composed by Ken Thorne, which was not used. Thorne had been asked by director Richard Lester to write a "sound-alike" version of "Pick Up the Pieces", but this was used for the scene in Don's Diner at the end of the film. Thorne wrote a few other pieces for various radios as well as "Honeymoon Hotel", a piece played as Clark Kent and Lois Lane are shown around a tacky hotel suite at Niagara Falls.

=== Soundtrack releases ===
==== Warner Bros. Records ====
1980: Single LP from Warner Bros. Records.

This album and the original album for Superman III were combined for an out-of-print Japanese CD release.

Side 1
| No. | Title | Length |
|---|---|---|
| 1. | "Preface" | 1:04 |
| 2. | "Main Title March" | 5:32 |
| 3. | "Lift Into Space / Release of the Villains" | 1:38 |
| 4. | "Lex Escapes" | 2:09 |
| 5. | "Honeymoon Hotel" | 3:16 |
| 6. | "Lex & Miss Teschmacher to Fortress" | 2:07 |
| 7. | "Clark Exposed as Superman" | 3:17 |
| 8. | "Lover Fly North" | 0:52 |

Side 2
| No. | Title | Length |
|---|---|---|
| 1. | "Mother's Advice" | 1:56 |
| 2. | "TV. President Resigns / Clark to Fortress" | 2:48 |
| 3. | "Aerial Battle / Superman Save Spire" | 2:51 |
| 4. | "Sad Return" | 1:43 |
| 5. | "Ursa Flies Over the Moon" | 2:28 |
| 6. | "Clark Fumbles Rescue" | 2:11 |
| 7. | "End Title March" | 4:16 |

==== Film Score Monthly ====
February 29, 2008: part of Superman: The Music (1978-1988) 8-CD set from Film Score Monthly.

This release restores the complete score, which is presented on disc 3 of the 8 disc set, with additional music presented on disc 8.

Disc 3
| No. | Title | Length |
|---|---|---|
| 1. | "Preface / Villains in Zone / Main Title March" | 8:18 |
| 2. | "Superman to Paris / Lois Climbs Tower" | 2:47 |
| 3. | "Walkie-Talkies / Gelignite Bangs / Superman Saves Lift" | 2:08 |
| 4. | "Lift Into Space / Releasing the Villains" | 1:32 |
| 5. | "Orange Juice / Prison Intro / My Little Black Box" | 1:48 |
| 6. | "Ursa Flies Over Moon / Spacecraft Wrecked / Moon to Earth" | 4:04 |
| 7. | "Lex Escapes" | 2:03 |
| 8. | "Sleeping Arrangements / Relaxing at Niagara / Looks Familiar / Superman Saves Boy" | 3:31 |
| 9. | "Lex and Miss Teschmacher to Fortress / Lex Plans Partnership" | 2:35 |
| 10. | "Suspecting Lois Takes the Plunge / Clark Fumbles Rescue / Villains Land by Lake" | 3:33 |
| 11. | "Clark Exposed as Superman" | 3:11 |
| 12. | "Sheriff and Duane Meet Villains / Lovers Fly North" | 2:21 |
| 13. | "Daddy's Rise and Fall / Flight for Flowers / East Houston Battle" | 3:03 |
| 14. | "Lovers at Dinner Table / Zod Meets General" | 1:35 |
| 15. | "Mother's Advice" | 1:49 |
| 16. | "To Bed / Mount Rushmore / Sweet Dreams" | 1:32 |
| 17. | "President Kneels Before Zod" | 1:53 |
| 18. | "Fight in Diner" | 1:04 |
| 19. | "TV President Resigns / Clark to Fortress" | 2:42 |
| 20. | "Return of the Green Crystal / Bored Zod" | 2:16 |
| 21. | "Non Wrecks Office" | 1:27 |
| 22. | "Aerial Battle / Zod Throws Slab / Superman Saves Spire" | 4:49 |
| 23. | "Superman Saves Petrol Tanker / Superman Fights Zod / Superman Flies Off" | 4:29 |
| 24. | "Villains Take Lex and Lois to Fortress / School Games" | 3:11 |
| 25. | "Superman Pulls Big Switch / Superman Triumphs Over Villains" | 1:56 |
| 26. | "Sad Return" | 1:38 |
| 27. | "Lois Forgets" | 1:46 |
| 28. | "Happy Lois Back to Normal / Superman Replaces Stars and Stripes / End Title March" | 5:34 |

Disc 8
| No. | Title | Length |
|---|---|---|
| 9. | "Honeymoon Hotel" | 3:11 |
| 10. | "Country & Western" | 2:07 |
| 11. | "East Houston Café" | 2:13 |
| 12. | "Car Radio for Ride Back" | 0:56 |
| 13. | "Diner Jukebox #1" | 2:14 |
| 14. | "Diner Jukebox #2" | 2:16 |

==== La-La Land Records ====
October 30, 2018: 3-CD set from La-La Land Records.

This release is presented on discs 1 and 2 of this 3-disc set, with source music from Superman, Superman II and Superman III filling the rest of disc 2, and the score for Superman III on disc 3.

Disc 1
| No. | Title | Length |
|---|---|---|
| 1. | "Preface / Villains in the Zone / Main Title March" | 8:23 |
| 2. | "Superman to Paris / Lois Climbs Tower" | 2:49 |
| 3. | "Walkie Talkies / Gelignite Bangs / Superman Saves Lift" | 2:10 |
| 4. | "Lift Into Space - Releasing the Villains" | 1:36 |
| 5. | "Orange Juice / Prison Intro / My Little Black Box" | 1:51 |
| 6. | "Ursa Flies Over Moon / Spacecraft Wrecked / Moon to Earth" | 4:05 |
| 7. | "Lex Escapes" | 2:07 |
| 8. | "Sleeping Arrangements /Relaxing at Niagara/ Looks Familiar/ Superman Saves Boy" | 3:33 |
| 9. | "Lex and Miss Teschmacher to Fortress / Lex Plans Partnership" | 2:39 |
| 10. | "Suspecting Lois Takes the Plunge / Clark Fumbles Rescue / Villains Land by Lake" | 3:37 |
| 11. | "Clark Exposed as Superman" | 3:13 |
| 12. | "Sheriff and Duane Meet Villains / Lovers Fly North" | 2:24 |
| 13. | "Daddy's Rise and Fall / Flight for Flowers / East Houston Battle" | 3:06 |
| 14. | "Lovers at Dinner Table / Zod Meets General" | 1:38 |
| 15. | "Mother's Advice" | 1:52 |
| 16. | "To Bed - Mt. Rushmore - Sweet Dreams" | 1:35 |
| 17. | "President Kneels Before Zod" | 1:55 |
| 18. | "Fight in Diner" | 1:06 |
| 19. | "TV President Resigns - Clark to Fortress" | 2:44 |
| 20. | "Return of the Green Crystal / Bored Zod" | 2:19 |
| 21. | "Non Wrecks Office" | 1:30 |
| 22. | "Aerial Battle / Zod Throws Slab / Superman Saves Spire" | 4:52 |
| 23. | "Superman Saves Petrol Tanker / Superman Battles Zod / Superman Flies Off" | 4:31 |

Disc 2
| No. | Title | Length |
|---|---|---|
| 1. | "Villains Take Lex and Lois to Fortress / School Games" | 3:14 |
| 2. | "Superman Pulls Big Switch / Superman Triumphs Over Villains" | 1:59 |
| 3. | "Sad Return" | 1:41 |
| 4. | "Lois Forgets" | 1:49 |
| 5. | "Happy Lois Back to Normal/Superman Replaces Stars and Stripes/ End Title March" | 5:38 |

Disc 2 (Source Music)
| No. | Title | Length |
|---|---|---|
| 17. | "Honeymoon Hotel" | 3:17 |
| 18. | "Country & Western" | 2:12 |
| 19. | "East Houston Café" | 2:16 |
| 20. | "Car Radio for Ride Back" | 1:00 |
| 21. | "Diner Jukebox No. 1" | 2:19 |
| 22. | "Diner Jukebox No. 2" | 2:20 |

== Superman III ==
The score was composed, orchestrated and conducted by Ken Thorne (with original Superman themes by John Williams). Recording took place on February 14–16; March 7–9 and 18, 1983 at CTS Studios (The Music Centre) in Wembley, Middlesex, England. The recording engineer was John Richards and the music editor was Bob Hathaway.

=== Leitmotifs ===
Ken Thorne was given a freer hand in the scoring of Superman III in accordance with the series' change in direction and more comedic tone. His new thematic material consisted of related themes for Gus Gorman and a general theme for computers, plus an ominous "Supercomputer" theme heard in the latter part of the score. Thorne also supplied a love theme for Lana Lang and Clark Kent, based on a melody written for the film by Giorgio Moroder. Lois Lane's theme is not present in the score because she only appears in the film briefly.

=== Source music ===
- "Roll Over Beethoven", the Chuck Berry hit as performed by The Beatles, and "Earth Angel" by The Penguins can be heard at Clark Kent's high school reunion. The use of a Beatles song was something of an in-joke referencing the films A Hard Day's Night and Help, both helmed by Superman III director Richard Lester. Giorgio Moroder was also commissioned to write several original songs for Superman III, some of which can be heard as source music in various scenes.

=== Soundtrack releases ===
==== Warner Bros. Records ====
1983: LP from Warner Bros. Records.

Superman III was the first of the films to have a score and song soundtrack combined on the same release, a common trend in the mid-1980s. Side A presented 19 minutes of Ken Thorne's score, while Side B contained music composed and produced by pop mogul Giorgio Moroder. These included three sung versions (with lyrics by Keith Forsey) of songs heard as source music in the film, plus Moroder's love theme for Clark Kent and Lana Lang (used by Thorne as the basis for his own theme), and ending with a completely synthesized version of the Superman II main title march.

This album and the original album for Superman II were combined for an out-of-print Japanese CD release.

Side 1
| No. | Title | Length |
|---|---|---|
| 1. | "Main Title" | 5:23 |
| 2. | "Saving the Factory / The Acid Test" | 6:09 |
| 3. | "Gus Finds a Way" | 0:59 |
| 4. | "The Two Faces of Superman" | 2:50 |
| 5. | "The Struggle Within / Finale" | 4:16 |

Side 2
| No. | Title | Producer | Length |
|---|---|---|---|
| 1. | "Rock On - Marshall Crenshaw" | Giorgio Moroder | 3:35 |
| 2. | "No See, No Cry - Chaka Khan" | Giorgio Moroder | 3:18 |
| 3. | "They Won't Get Me - Roger Miller" | Giorgio Moroder | 3:20 |
| 4. | "Love Theme - Helen St. John" | Giorgio Moroder | 3:14 |
| 5. | "Main Title March" | Giorgio Moroder | 4:20 |

==== Film Score Monthly ====
February 29, 2008: part of Superman: The Music (1978-1988) 8-CD set from Film Score Monthly.

This release restores the complete score, which is presented on disc 4 of the 8 disc set, with additional music presented on disc 8.

Disc 4
| No. | Title | Length |
|---|---|---|
| 1. | "Main Title (The Streets of Metropolis)" | 5:27 |
| 2. | "Gus on Computer After the Cents" | 1:06 |
| 3. | "Saving the Factory / The Acid Test" | 6:11 |
| 4. | "Pay day for Gus / School Gym - Earth Angel / Vulcan" | 1:37 |
| 5. | "Lana and Clark in Cornfield / Clark Rescues Ricky" | 2:27 |
| 6. | "Gus Shows the Booze / Gus Finds a Way" | 1:20 |
| 7. | "Montage" | 3:10 |
| 8. | "Colombian Storm" | 1:30 |
| 9. | "Kryptonite / Gus Down Building / Searching for Kryptonite" | 2:16 |
| 10. | "Lana and Clark on Telephone / Kryptonite Sting / Superman Affected by Kryptonite / Superman Too Late" | 1:48 |
| 11. | "Tower of Pisa / What Will It Do for Me" | 1:58 |
| 12. | "Superman and Lorelei on Statue / Superman Ruins Tanker" | 2:19 |
| 13. | "Boxes in Canyon / Drunken Superman" | 3:22 |
| 14. | "The Two Faces of Superman" | 2:52 |
| 15. | "The Struggle Within" | 2:27 |
| 16. | "The Final Victory" | 2:15 |
| 17. | "Preparing Balloons / Superman Coming / Computer" | 3:02 |
| 18. | "Rockets / Video Games / Big Missile" | 3:11 |
| 19. | "Superman Confronts Ross / Computer Takes Over / Gus Fights Ross" | 2:13 |
| 20. | "The Computer Comes Alive / Superman Leaves Computer Cave" | 2:32 |
| 21. | "Metal Vera / Computer Blows Up" | 2:55 |
| 22. | "Gus Flying With Superman" | 1:19 |
| 23. | "Diamond Sting / Thank You Superman / Superman Gus / Clark Gives Lana Diamond Ring" | 1:40 |
| 24. | "End Credits" | 4:28 |

Disc 8
| No. | Title | Producer | Length |
|---|---|---|---|
| 15. | "Main Title (The Streets of Metropolis) (alternate)" | | 5:26 |
| 16. | "Pay Day For Gus (alternate)" | | 0:40 |
| 17. | "Colombian Storm Part 1" | | 1:05 |
| 18. | "Olympic Parade" | | 0:25 |
| 19. | "Après Ski" | | 1:04 |
| 20. | "Rock On - Marshall Crenshaw" | Giorgio Moroder | 3:35 |
| 21. | "No See, No Cry - Chaka Khan" | Giorgio Moroder | 3:18 |
| 22. | "They Won't Get Me - Roger Miller" | Giorgio Moroder | 3:20 |
| 23. | "Love Theme - Helen St. John" | Giorgio Moroder | 3:14 |
| 24. | "Main Title March" | Giorgio Moroder | 4:20 |

==== La-La Land Records ====
October 30, 2018: 3-CD set from La-La Land Records.

This release is presented on disc 3 of this 3-disc set, with the score for Superman II on discs 1 and 2 and source music from Superman, Superman II and Superman III filling the rest of disc 2.

Disc 2 (Source Music)
| No. | Title | Producer | Length |
|---|---|---|---|
| 23. | "Colombian Storm Intro" | | 1:10 |
| 24. | "Olympic Parade" | | 0:28 |
| 25. | "Après Ski" | | 1:06 |
| 26. | "Rock On - Marshall Crenshaw" | Giorgio Moroder | 3:45 |
| 27. | "No See, No Cry - Chaka Khan" | Giorgio Moroder | 3:20 |
| 28. | "They Won't Get Me - Roger Miller" | Giorgio Moroder | 3:22 |
| 29. | "Love Theme - Helen St. John" | Giorgio Moroder | 3:18 |
| 30. | "Main Title March" | Giorgio Moroder | 4:17 |

Disc 3
| No. | Title | Length |
|---|---|---|
| 1. | "Main Title (The Streets of Metropolis)" | 5:31 |
| 2. | "Gus on Computer After the Cents" | 1:08 |
| 3. | "Saving the Factory - The Acid Test" | 6:15 |
| 4. | "Payday for Gus / School Gym - Earth Angel / Vulcan" | 1:39 |
| 5. | "Lana and Clark in Cornfield / Clark Rescues Ricky" | 2:29 |
| 6. | "Gus Shows the Booze / Gus Finds a Way" | 1:21 |
| 7. | "Montage" | 3:12 |
| 8. | "Colombian Storm" | 1:32 |
| 9. | "Kryptonite / Gus Down Building / Searching for Kryptonite" | 2:18 |
| 10. | "Lana and Clark on Telephone / Kryptonite Sting / Superman Affected by Kryptonite / Superman Too Late" | 1:50 |
| 11. | "Tower of Pisa / What Will It Do for Me" | 2:00 |
| 12. | "Superman and Lorelei on Statue / Superman Ruins Tanker" | 2:22 |
| 13. | "Boxes in Canyon / Drunken Superman" | 3:24 |
| 14. | "The Two Faces of Superman" | 2:54 |
| 15. | "The Struggle Within" | 2:29 |
| 16. | "The Final Victory" | 2:19 |
| 17. | "Preparing Balloons / Superman Coming / Computer" | 3:04 |
| 18. | "Rockets / Video Games / Big Missile" | 3:15 |
| 19. | "Superman Confronts Ross / Computer Takes Over / Gus Fights Ross" | 2:16 |
| 20. | "The Computer Comes Alive / Superman Leaves Computer Cave" | 2:35 |
| 21. | "Metal Vera / Computer Blows Up" | 2:57 |
| 22. | "Gus Flying With Superman" | 1:22 |
| 23. | "Diamond Sting / Thank You Superman / Superman Gus / Clark Gives Lana Diamond Ring" | 1:43 |
| 24. | "End Credits" | 4:29 |
| 25. | "Pay Day for Gus [Alternate]" | 0:49 |
| 26. | "Main Title (The Streets of Metropolis) [Alternate]" | 5:29 |

== Superman IV: The Quest for Peace ==
The score was adapted and conducted by Alexander Courage (from music by John Williams). Recording took place from May 11–18, 1987 at the Bavaria Studios in Munich, Germany, performed by Symphony-Orchestra Graunke. Recording engineer was Peter Kramper. Additional recording took place May 23 – June 2, 1987, at CTS Studios (The Music Centre) in Wembley, Middlesex, England, performed by the National Philharmonic Orchestra. Recording engineer was Dick Lewzey, assisted by Steve Price and Jonathan Ruttley. The score was orchestrated by Frank Barber and Harry Roberts, and the music editor was Bob Hathaway. Jack Fishman was musical advisor. Songs by Paul Fishman were recorded in September 1986 in Hampstead, London, England.

=== Leitmotifs ===
John Williams composed three new themes for Superman IV: The Quest for Peace, attaching to three new characters.

- "Lacy's Theme", also known as "Someone Like You", is a sultry, sexy melody for the daughter of the new owner of the Daily Planet, who has eyes for Clark Kent.
- "Jeremy's Theme" is a light, lyrical melody for the young boy who appeals to Superman to rid the world of nuclear weapons.
- "Nuclear Man Theme" is a driving action theme used for Superman's battle with the villain created when Lex Luthor places Superman's genetic material on a nuclear warhead detonated by the sun.

Alexander Courage adapted Williams' themes for the film, integrating the three new ones with all of the existing themes from Superman. He also supplied two new themes of his own: a "missile" motif for when nuclear arms are shown or discussed, and a "Russian" motif, a minor mode march used when Soviets and their weapons appear.

=== Source music ===
- "Whole Lotta Shakin' Goin' On" by Jerry Lee Lewis can be heard in Lenny Luthor's car when he's about to release his uncle, Lex Luthor, from prison. Paul Fishman, head of the 80s rock group Re-Flex, was commissioned to write original songs for the film, but only one of these, "Workout", was used in the released version of the film, when Clark and Lacy are seen at the Metropolis Fitness Center. Some of Fishman's other songs were intended for a deleted Metro Club discothèque sequence. "Whole Lotta Shakin' Goin' On", Fishman's "Workout", "Headphone Heaven" and "Revolution Now" (the latter two were for the deleted scene) would have all appeared on the cancelled soundtrack album. All songs except for Lewis' are included on Superman: The Music (1978-1988) box set.

=== Soundtrack releases ===
==== Film Score Monthly ====
February 29, 2008: part of Superman: The Music (1978-1988) 8-CD set from Film Score Monthly.

Alexander Courage completed a 100-minute score for a version of Superman IV: The Quest for Peace that ran over two hours. As a result of negative audience response to the preview, the picture was cut down to a length of 89 minutes for U.S. release. At the urging of visual effects supervisor Harrison Ellenshaw, two action scenes were reinstated for the international version, which ran 92 minutes and was later shown on U.S. television. As a result of this cutting of running time, much of the music was not heard and "Jeremy's Theme" in particular was virtually undetectable in the final version.

Although an album release for Superman IV: The Quest for Peace was produced in 1987, it was aborted when the film was shortened. As with Superman III, it was to contain several songs (by Paul Fishman of Re-Flex) and a small sampling of the score by Alexander Courage (adapting John Williams' themes). In 2008, the 8-CD box set Superman: The Music (1978-1988) premiered the entire score for Superman IV: The Quest for Peace as composed for the long version of the film. Also included were all of Paul Fishman's songs created for the deleted Metro Club disco and other scenes in the film. Tracks in italics were intended to be released on the cancelled soundtrack album (Jerry Lee Lewis's "Whole Lotta Shakin' Going On", heard in the film, would also have been included).

La-La Land Records re-released the complete soundtrack, with identical track listing, in 2018 as a stand-alone 2-CD set.

Disc 5
| No. | Title | Length |
|---|---|---|
| 1. | "Fanfare / Space Saver" | 1:48 |
| 2. | "Main Title / Back in Time" | 5:40 |
| 3. | "Pow! / Good Morning" | 2:45 |
| 4. | "Smoke the Yokes / Nefarious" | 1:04 |
| 5. | "To Work / Train Stopper" | 2:06 |
| 6. | "Someone Like You (Lacy's Theme)" | 3:17 |
| 7. | "Jeremy's Theme" | 2:13 |
| 8. | "For Real / The Class" | 1:43 |
| 9. | "Hair Raisers" | 0:59 |
| 10. | "Lacy / The Visit" | 2:27 |
| 11. | "First Nuclear Man" | 5:24 |
| 12. | "Nuke 1 Fight / Ashes" | 3:45 |
| 13. | "Headline" | 2:48 |
| 14. | "Fresh Air" | 4:33 |
| 15. | "United Nations / Net Man" | 4:42 |
| 16. | "Sunstroke / Enter Nuclear Man 2" | 5:25 |
| 17. | "Flight To Earth / Introducing Nuclear Man 2" | 3:27 |
| 18. | "Lacy (disco version)" | 2:13 |
| 19. | "Lacy's Place" | 5:23 |
| 20. | "Ear Ache / Confrontation / Tornado" | 8:09 |
| 21. | "Volcano" | 2:18 |
| 22. | "Statue of Liberty Fight" | 3:44 |

Disc 6
| No. | Title | Producer | Length |
|---|---|---|---|
| 1. | "Nuclear Man Theme" | | 2:48 |
| 2. | "Down With Flu" | | 3:12 |
| 3. | "Two-Faced Lex / Missile Buildup" | | 1:39 |
| 4. | "Persuader / Awakened" | | 3:13 |
| 5. | "Abducted / Mutual Distrust" | | 4:43 |
| 6. | "Metropolis Fight / Lift to the Moon" | | 3:36 |
| 7. | "Moon Fight / Goodbye Nuke" | | 5:06 |
| 8. | "Come Uppance / Lifted / Quarried / Flying With Jeremy / End Credits" | | 9:34 |
| 9. | "Fresh Air (album version)" | | 4:35 |
| 10. | "Someone Like You (Lacy's Theme) (slow version)" | | 3:33 |
| 11. | "Red Square Band" | | 0:52 |
| 12. | "Superfly Guy" | Phil Fishman | 4:11 |
| 13. | "Headphone Heaven" | Phil Fishman | 3:23 |
| 14. | "Revolution Now" | Phil Fishman | 4:26 |
| 15. | "Saxy Sadie" | Phil Fishman | 4:47 |
| 16. | "Krypton Nights" | Phil Fishman | 4:44 |
| 17. | "Life's Too Dangerous" | Phil Fishman | 3:14 |
| 18. | "Workout" | Phil Fishman | 2:27 |
| 19. | "Lois Love" | Phil Fishman | 4:56 |

== Superman Returns ==
The score was composed by John Ottman, conducted by Damon Intrabartolo, with orchestrations provided by Ottman, Intrabartolo, Rick Giovinazzo, Kevin Kliesch, Frank Macchia, Lior Rosner, Jeffrey Schindler and John Ashton Thomas and was performed by the Hollywood Studio Symphony. Director Bryan Singer originally wanted John Williams to score the film, but Williams declined due to working on Star Wars: Episode III – Revenge of the Sith at the time; he had also turned down an offer to score Richard Donner's version of Superman II for the same reason.

=== Soundtrack releases ===
==== Standard edition ====
The tracks appear out of order compared to how they appear in the movie. This was done by Ottman for listening purposes.

Disc 1
| No. | Title | Length |
|---|---|---|
| 1. | "Main Titles" | 3:49 |
| 2. | "Memories" | 3:07 |
| 3. | "Rough Flight" | 5:13 |
| 4. | "Little Secrets/Power of the Sun" | 2:49 |
| 5. | "Bank Job" | 2:21 |
| 6. | "How Could You Leave Us?" | 5:49 |
| 7. | "Tell Me Everything" | 3:13 |
| 8. | "You're Not One of Them" | 2:22 |
| 9. | "Not Like The Train Set" | 5:12 |
| 10. | "So Long Superman" | 5:31 |
| 11. | "The People Care For" | 3:27 |
| 12. | "I Wanted You to Know" | 2:56 |
| 13. | "Saving The World" | 3:12 |
| 14. | "In The Hands of Mortals" | 2:11 |
| 15. | "Reprise/Fly Away" | 4:15 |

== Man of Steel ==
Director Zack Snyder's 2013 reboot of the series, Man of Steel, is scored by Hans Zimmer, and is the first Superman film not to use any of Williams' themes.

=== Soundtrack releases ===
==== Standard edition ====
June 11, 2013: on CD from WaterTower Music.

Disc 1
| No. | Title | Length |
|---|---|---|
| 1. | "Look to the Stars" | 2:58 |
| 2. | "Oil Rig" | 1:45 |
| 3. | "Sent Here for a Reason" | 3:46 |
| 4. | "DNA" | 3:34 |
| 5. | "Goodbye My Son" | 2:01 |
| 6. | "If You Love These People" | 3:22 |
| 7. | "Krypton's Last" | 1:58 |
| 8. | "Terraforming" | 9:49 |
| 9. | "Tornado" | 2:53 |
| 10. | "You Die or I Do" | 3:13 |
| 11. | "Launch" | 2:36 |
| 12. | "Ignition" | 1:19 |
| 13. | "I Will Find Him" | 2:57 |
| 14. | "This Is Clark Kent" | 3:47 |
| 15. | "I Have So Many Questions" | 3:47 |
| 16. | "Flight" | 4:18 |
| 17. | "What Are You Going to Do When You Are Not Saving the World?" | 5:27 |

==== Deluxe edition ====
The deluxe edition includes all the tracks in the standard edition, as well as the tracks shown here. The digital version of the deluxe edition lists the track "What Are You Going to Do When You Are Not Saving the World?" as the first track of the second disc rather than the last track of the first disc.

Disc 2
| No. | Title | Length |
|---|---|---|
| 1. | "Man of Steel (Hans' Original Sketchbook)" | 28:16 |
| 2. | "Are You Listening, Clark?" | 2:48 |
| 3. | "General Zod" | 7:21 |
| 4. | "You Led Us Here" | 2:59 |
| 5. | "This Is Madness!" | 3:48 |
| 6. | "Earth" | 6:11 |
| 7. | "Arcade" | 7:25 |

Music appearing in the film and not included on the soundtrack

| # | Title | Performer(s) |
|---|---|---|
| 1 | "Ring of Fire" | Allison Crowe |
| 2 | "Seasons" | Chris Cornell |
| 3 | "The Long Walk" | Marco Beltrami, Buck Sanders |

== Batman v Superman: Dawn of Justice ==
=== Soundtrack releases ===
==== Standard edition ====
March 18, 2016: on CD from WaterTower Music.

Disc 1
| No. | Title | Length |
|---|---|---|
| 1. | "Beautiful Lie" | 3:47 |
| 2. | "Their War Here" | 4:34 |
| 3. | "The Red Capes Are Coming" | 3:32 |
| 4. | "Day of the Dead" | 4:01 |
| 5. | "Must There Be a Superman?" | 3:58 |
| 6. | "New Rules" | 4:02 |
| 7. | "Do You Bleed?" | 4:36 |
| 8. | "Problems Up Here" | 4:25 |
| 9. | "Black and Blue" | 8:30 |
| 10. | "Tuesday" | 4:00 |
| 11. | "Is She with You?" | 5:46 |
| 12. | "This Is My World" | 6:23 |
| 13. | "Men Are Still Good (The Batman Suite)" | 14:03 |

==== Deluxe edition ====
The deluxe edition includes all the tracks in the standard edition, as well as the tracks shown here. Many tracks featured in the film were not released with the official soundtrack in March 2016. These tracks were later released in the film's complete score nearly two years later, on March 6, 2018.

Disc 2
| No. | Title | Length |
|---|---|---|
| 1. | "Blood of My Blood" | 4:25 |
| 2. | "Vigilante" | 3:53 |
| 3. | "May I Help You, Mr. Wayne?" | 3:27 |
| 4. | "They Were Hunters" | 2:45 |
| 5. | "Fight Night" | 4:20 |

==== Source music not included on the soundtrack ====
| # | Title | Performer(s) |
|---|---|---|
| 1 | "Night and Day" | Richard Cheese & Lounge Against The Machine |
| 2 | "Ev'ry Time We Say Goodbye" | Richard Cheese & Lounge Against The Machine |
| 3 | "Shostakovich: Waltz II" | Royal Concertgebouw Orchestra, Riccardo Chailly |

== Superman (2025) ==
=== Soundtrack releases ===
May 14, 2025: on CD from WaterTower Music.

Superman
| No. | Title | Length |
|---|---|---|
| 1. | "Theme from Superman (Official Trailer Version)" | 3:01 |

On the soundtrack, Peter Safran's daughter Lou Lou performs a song with the American rock band Foxy Shazam, with Lou Lou and the band's member Eric Nally on vocals, and written by James Gunn and Nally.

== Superman: The Ultimate Collection ==
- The radio shows of the early 1940s already had the famous phrases, "Faster than a speeding bullet... It's a bird... it's a plane... it's Superman!" uttered by studio announcer Jackson Beck. Initially, the radio series had no theme tune under its introductory lines.
- The Superman cartoon series produced by the Fleischer Studios during the 1940s included a triad-based theme composed by Fleischer musical director Sammy Timberg. The cartoons were clearly intended to extend the characters from radio, as Jackson Beck again provided the introduction voiceover of the famous phrases, and Bud Collyer reprised his radio role as the Man of Steel.
- The two Superman Columbia Pictures serials of the late 1940s, starring Kirk Alyn, featured a theme that began with a triad, repeated once. The rest of the theme was a standard orchestral march, in a minor key, that did not refer back to the original triad. This theme was composed by Mischa Bakaleinikoff, who scored a number of the Columbia serials' themes.
- The 1951 film Superman and the Mole Men initially had an orchestral score by Darrel Calker featuring standard "sci fi" film overtones. That film was eventually edited down into the two-part episode which closed the TV series' first season, with the standard TV theme wrapped around it.
- The 1966 Broadway musical It's a Bird...It's a Plane...It's Superman, starring Bob Holiday, featured music by Charles Strouse and lyrics by Lee Adams. The script was written by David Newman and Robert Benton, who would go on to write the second draft of the screenplay for the first Superman film, released in 1978.

All of the above (as well as some TV and film themes) were recorded by a modern orchestra and released on a 1999 CD called Superman: The Ultimate Collection, released by Varèse Sarabande Records.

Disc 1
| No. | Title | Composer | Length |
|---|---|---|---|
| 1. | "The Adventures of Superman (from Adventures of Superman)" | Leon Klatzkin | 1:23 |
| 2. | "Main Title (from Superman: The Movie)" | John Williams | 4:33 |
| 3. | "The Trip To Earth (from Superman: The Movie)" | John Williams | 2:45 |
| 4. | "Leaving Home (from Superman: The Movie)" | John Williams | 3:56 |
| 5. | "Superfeats (from Superman: The Movie)" | John Williams | 3:21 |
| 6. | "Love Theme (from Superman: The Movie)" | John Williams | 5:37 |
| 7. | "The Columbia Serial (from Superman: The Columbia Serial)" | Mischa Bakaleinakoff | 1:01 |
| 8. | "It's Superman (from It's A Bird, It's A Plane, It's Superman)" | Charles Strouse and Lee Adams | 3:03 |
| 9. | "Fanfare and Clark Kent Screws Up (from Superman II)" | John Williams & Ken Thorne | 3:36 |
| 10. | "Love Theme and Flying (from Superman II)" | John Williams & Ken Thorne | 3:27 |
| 11. | "Phantasmagoria (from "On Themes From It's A Bird, It's A Plane, It's Superman")" | Charles Strouse and Lee Adams | 5:38 |
| 12. | "Honeymoon Hotel (from Superman II)" | Ken Thorne | 3:30 |
| 13. | "March of the Villains (from Superman: The Movie)" | John Williams | 3:41 |
| 14. | "Main Title (from Supergirl)" | Jerry Goldsmith | 2:46 |
| 15. | "Main Title (The Streets of Metropolis) (from Superman III)" | Ken Thorne & John Williams | 5:22 |
| 16. | "The Max Fleischer Cartoon (from Superman)" | Sammy Timberg | 1:36 |

== Adventures of Superman: The Original 1950s TV Series ==
The TV theme for the 1950s series Adventures of Superman, starring George Reeves, had the unusual lead-in of a harp playing a kind of stringed "drumroll" as the camera moved through space, segueing into a dramatic brass triad accompanied by cymbals, drums, etc., at the moment when a shooting star explodes on the screen and the title card appears. A variation on the classic "Faster than a speeding bullet..." was rendered by deep-voiced actor Bill Kennedy. Three of the main characters from the show utter the famous lines "Look, up in the sky!", "It's a bird!", "It's a plane!". They are actors Robert Shayne, who played Inspector Henderson, George Reeves himself and Phyllis Coates who played the first Lois Lane. The actors just happened to be in the studio when the recording was being made.

The opening and closing theme, as well as a number of recurring underscore themes from the first season (the "Phyllis Coates episodes"), were released in 2000 on the CD Adventures of Superman: The Original 1950s TV Series from Varèse Sarabande Records. The liner notes make the point that although series musical arranger Leon Klatzkin is conventionally credited with composing the theme, that credit is in some doubt. The use of the Superman theme in the show became ingrained in viewers' minds because the same section of music was played nearly every time the scene cut to Superman flying. The episodes themselves were tracked with existing "library music". One particularly notable instance was a cue called "Tumult and Commotion", extracted from Miklos Rozsa's "Theme, Variations, and Finale", Op. 13, from 1933. Rozsa was one of Hollywood's leading composers during the 1950s, but he had no involvement in this repurposing of his music.

Disc 1
| No. | Title | Length |
|---|---|---|
| 1. | "Superman Main Title" | 0:58 |
| 2. | "The Slap" | 1:50 |
| 3. | "Violin Scream" | 1:17 |
| 4. | "Brawl" | 4:23 |
| 5. | "Tympani Beat Tension" | 2:14 |
| 6. | "Delirium" | 1:30 |
| 7. | "Build To Sting" | 0:28 |
| 8. | "The Skeleton" | 2:33 |
| 9. | "Last Reel Fight" | 2:57 |
| 10. | "Creeping Misterioso" | 1:27 |
| 11. | "Murder Will Out" | 2:18 |
| 12. | "Spectral Thumps" | 1:59 |
| 13. | "Mounting Drama" | 0:55 |
| 14. | "The Fight" | 1:38 |
| 15. | "Hit And Run!" | 1:17 |
| 16. | "A Nightmare" | 1:33 |
| 17. | "Quiet Tension" | 1:32 |
| 18. | "Spreading Misterioso" | 4:18 |
| 19. | "Blood and Thunder / Just In Time" | 2:29 |
| 20. | "Beating Heart" | 4:20 |
| 21. | "The Battle" | 2:26 |
| 22. | "The Monkey Mystery Suite: Brutal Regiment" | 0:46 |
| 23. | "The Monkey Mystery Suite: Moleska's Plight" | 2:11 |
| 24. | "The Monkey Mystery Suite: Tender Secret" | 1:41 |
| 25. | "The Monkey Mystery Suite: Cue For String Orchestra" | 1:42 |
| 26. | "The Monkey Mystery Suite: Tragic Tension" | 1:41 |
| 27. | "The Monkey Mystery Suite: June Waltz" | 1:41 |
| 28. | "The Monkey Mystery Suite: La Tango" | 2:02 |
| 29. | "Superman On Earth Suite: Smallville Pastorale" | 1:40 |
| 30. | "Superman On Earth Suite: Years Go By" | 1:51 |
| 31. | "Superman On Earth Suite: He Was A Good Father" | 2:24 |
| 32. | "Superman On Earth Suite: A Mother's Farewell" | 0:39 |
| 33. | "Superman On Earth Suite: Shadows on the Wall" | 2:45 |
| 34. | "Superman On Earth Suite: Revenge!" | 2:23 |
| 35. | "Superman On Earth Suite: Superman End (long version)" | 1:07 |

== Superman (1988 animated series) ==
The 1988 animated series from Ruby-Spears was scored by Ron Jones. Its main titles opened with the John Williams theme from the Christopher Reeve films, then segueing into a similarly-styled original theme by Jones which was used as the primary Superman leitmotif in the episodes' underscores. This short-lived series (13 episodes) was distinctive for its "Superman's Family Album" vignettes, which each presented an event from some point during Clark Kent's Smallville upbringing. For these mini episodes, Jones continued to follow Williams' lead by employing a Coplandesque Americana sound.

Jones' music for this series was released in its entirety on its own CD as part of the 8-disc collection Superman: The Music (1978-1988), issued by Film Score Monthly in 2008.

Disc 7
| No. | Title | Length |
|---|---|---|
| 1. | "Main Title" | 1:10 |
| 2. | "Destroy The Defendroids: Drone / Blown Drone" | 2:13 |
| 3. | "Destroy The Defendroids: Talk With Lex" | 2:31 |
| 4. | "Destroy The Defendroids: Trouble in the Park / Fire Rescues" | 3:23 |
| 5. | "Destroy The Defendroids: Supe Quits / Fake Quake" | 2:22 |
| 6. | "Destroy The Defendroids: Saved From Lava / Plans" | 2:19 |
| 7. | "Destroy The Defendroids: Super Defendroid / Operation Nugget" | 2:42 |
| 8. | "Destroy The Defendroids: Droid Wars / Warning" | 3:28 |
| 9. | "Destroy The Defendroids: Superman's Family Album - The Adoption" | 4:27 |
| 10. | "Main Title Alternate" | 1:09 |
| 11. | "Fugitive From Space: Alien Discovery" | 2:02 |
| 12. | "Fugitive From Space: The Suit" | 1:37 |
| 13. | "Fugitive From Space: Daily Planet Mystery Play-On / Jimmy And Chief" | 1:15 |
| 14. | "Fugitive From Space: Kyroni Encounter" | 2:23 |
| 15. | "Fugitive From Space: The Planting / Ship's Log" | 2:17 |
| 16. | "Fugitive From Space: Something's Up #2 / Bad Guy Dialogue #1" | 1:29 |
| 17. | "Fugitive From Space: Trouble In Metropolis" | 0:51 |
| 18. | "Fugitive From Space: Aliens Take Over The World" | 2:10 |
| 19. | "Fugitive From Space: Superman's Family Album - The Supermarket" | 3:58 |
| 20. | "Superman Theme" | 1:05 |
| 21. | "By The Skin of the Dragon's Teeth: China Play-On / Nukua's Theme" | 1:27 |
| 22. | "By The Skin of the Dragon's Teeth: Saboteur" | 1:37 |
| 23. | "By The Skin of the Dragon's Teeth: Transition #3 / Bad Guy Dialogue #6 / Dragon's Treasure" | 1:24 |
| 24. | "Triple Play: Prankster's Theme / Game Montage / No Baseball" | 3:49 |
| 25. | "Cybron Strikes: Superman's Family Album - The First Day of School" | 4:38 |
| 26. | "Library Suite #1" | 4:55 |
| 27. | "Library Suite #2" | 3:22 |
| 28. | "Aliens Take Over The World (Alternate #1 - Orchestra Only)" | 2:08 |
| 29. | "Library Suite #3" | 2:44 |
| 30. | "Library Suite #4" | 2:03 |
| 31. | "Library Suite #5" | 1:53 |
| 32. | "Aliens Take Over The World (Alternate #2 - Strings / Synth Only)" | 1:28 |
| 33. | "Library Suite #6" | 1:34 |
| 34. | "Library Suite #7" | 0:36 |
| 35. | "End Title" | 0:27 |

== Other music ==
- The theme for the 1990s series Lois & Clark, starring Dean Cain and Teri Hatcher, was composed by Jay Gruska, the son in-law of John Williams, composer of the score for the 1978 film Superman. This was another dramatic orchestral rendition, with a triad again in evidence, but not so prominently placed in the theme's score.
- Smallville, starring Tom Welling, has a vocal, rock-oriented main theme rather than a traditional "heroic" one. Written by band Remy Zero, the song takes the name "Save Me", from its chorus. Composer Mark Snow employs traditional orchestral underscore regularly. In several episodes, he has also musically alluded to themes from John Williams' score for the 1978 film Superman. The Williams theme also featured prominently during the series finale's closing moments.
- The 1966 series The New Adventures of Superman, produced by Lou Scheimer's and Norm Prescott's Filmation Associates, was scored by John Gart, under the name John Marion. Its main theme was based on a rising four-note motif evocative of previous Superman themes, but jazzier in style. No commercially available recordings of Gart's music were known to exist as of early April 2016.
- Shirley Walker's theme for the 1996 Superman: The Animated Series is yet another brassy orchestral piece with a triad-based melody. It was occasionally used as Superman's leitmotif in episodes of Justice League.
- When the later Batman: The Animated Series and Superman: The Animated Series were combined to form a "new" series, The New Batman/Superman Adventures, another new theme was composed by Shirley Walker. Her theme was later used in a Kraft Mac n Cheese commercial in the 2000s.
- Brandon Routh reprised his role as Superman for the 2019-20 Arrowverse crossover "Crisis on Infinite Earths". In the first scene where Clark changes into his Kingdom Come inspired costume, the John Williams theme can be heard. Small clips are also played during his fight with Tyler Hoechlin's Superman.
- "HERO" was songwriter Christopher Santangelo's tribute to Christopher Reeve's portrayal of Superman. Christopher Reeve died October 10, 2004. Surge of Power: The Stuff of Heroes was released on August 14, 2004, making 'HERO" the official last song about Superman to appear in a movie before the passing of Christopher Reeve, who statistically is considered the best Superman of all time.
- In the 2022 animated film DC League of Super-Pets, Williams’ Superman score is heard throughout the film, from the opening sequence of the infant Kal-El and puppy Krypto playing together and “Planet Krypton Fanfare” played during the destruction of the planet as they escape for Earth; Krypto (voiced by Dwayne Johnson) briefly singing his praises about his relationship with Superman to the tune of the “Superman Theme;” when Krypto breaks out of Stryker's Island prison after getting back his powers and in several confrontations with the hairless guinea pig, Lulu, the film’s main antagonist.
