= Boom in the Moon =

- DVD cover
- Directed by: Jaime Salvador
- Written by: Jaime Salvador/Victor Trivas
- Produced by: Alexander Salkind
- Starring: Buster Keaton; Ángel Garasa; Virginia Seret; Luis G. Barreiro
- Cinematography: Agustín Jiménez
- Edited by: Rafael Ceballos
- Music by: Leo Cardona/Georges Tzipine
- Distributed by: Alsa Film
- Release dates: 2 August 1946 (Mexico); October 1983 (U.S.)
- Running time: 90 minutes
- Country: Mexico
- Language: Spanish

Boom in the Moon (Spanish: El Moderno Barba Azul, transl. The Modern-Day Bluebeard) is a 1946 Mexican comedy science fiction film directed by Jaime Salvador and starring Buster Keaton. The film is notable both as Keaton's only Mexican production and as the last time Keaton had star billing in a feature film.

== Plot ==
Keaton plays an American soldier during World War II who escapes from an airplane crash over the Pacific Ocean. He is adrift for a long period and his face becomes covered in a scraggly beard. He arrives on a beach, believing he has landed in Japan, but he is actually in Mexico. He wanders into a fishing village and is promptly arrested after being mistaken for a wanted serial killer who marries and murders women (also known as a "bluebeard"). Keaton and another prisoner (Angel Garasa) are put in the custody of an aeronautics scientist who is planning to launch a crewed rocket into outer space. The two prisoners, along with the scientist's assistant (Virginia Seret) are blasted into space, but their craft lands in an isolated portion of Mexico instead. They mistake a beekeeper wearing protective headgear as an alien, while the beekeeper believes the trio (who are wearing wizard robes) are aliens. The prisoners and the scientist's assistant are apprehended by the local police, and the matter is quickly settled. Keaton and his cellmate receive pardons and are free to go on their way.

== Production ==
Boom in the Moon marked the first time since the 1935 production The Invader (a.k.a. An Old Spanish Custom) that Buster Keaton was given a starring role in a feature film. During the first part of the 1940s, Keaton's screen work was limited to small supporting parts in feature films and headlining a series of short films made by Columbia Pictures.

Boom in the Moon marked the first solo producer credit enjoyed by Alexander Salkind (1921–1997). Born in the Free City of Danzig, the son of film producer Michael Salkind, he fled Europe with his family prior to World War II, settling in Mexico City. Salkind would later produce the notable films Austerlitz (1960), the Orson Welles-directed version of The Trial (1962) and the epic Superman (1978) and its sequels.

As a Mexican film, the production was shot in Spanish. Keaton did not speak Spanish, but spoke a broken version for his relatively limited dialogue. Although he was not credited with contributions to the screenplay, Keaton incorporated several gags from his classic silent films in this offering, including a horseback riding stunt that was used in Hard Luck (1921) and Go West (1925).

== Release ==
The film, under its Spanish title El Moderno Barba Azul, was theatrically released in Mexico in 1946. However, the film was not commercially released in the U.S. until 1983, when it was distributed on home video by Cantharus Productions on the U.S.A. Home Video label under the new title Boom in the Moon. The U.S. video version was cut-down to 69 minutes, dubbed into English and not presented with the original Spanish-language soundtrack.

The film has received mixed notices from critics and film scholars. Charles Tatum, in a review published by eFilmCritic.com, stated the "video company that released this must have won the rights to this in a fifty cent poker game. They should have saved the late Keaton some embarrassment and left it on the shelf...this is my pick for the worst, most inept film of the 1940s." Dave Sindelar, reviewing the film for the online magazine Fantastic Movie Musings and Ramblings, stated the film "represents the nadir for one of the greatest screen comedians of all time" and that "all it does is remind you of how low he'd fallen to this point." British film historian Kevin Brownlow was even more harsh, declaring Boom in the Moon to be the worst film ever made.

However, Keaton historian Jim Kline, in his book The Complete Films of Buster Keaton, offered praise for Boom in the Moon by stating the film's "pacing is lively and the restagings of old gags work well within the kooky plot."
