= Superman II =

1980 superhero film by Richard Lester

- 1981 US theatrical release poster
- Directed by: Richard Lester (Note: Richard Donner, the film's original director, was fired from the film in March 1979 after 75 percent of it had already been filmed. Lester took over directing duties and, as he could not be credited according to the Directors Guild of America unless he shot 40 percent of the film, re-shot most of the film.)
- Screenplay by: Mario Puzo; David Newman; Leslie Newman
- Story by: Mario Puzo
- Based on: Superman by: Jerry Siegel; Joe Shuster
- Produced by: Pierre Spengler
- Starring: Gene Hackman; Christopher Reeve; Ned Beatty; Jackie Cooper; Sarah Douglas; Margot Kidder; Jack O'Halloran; Valerie Perrine; Susannah York; Clifton James; E. G. Marshall; Marc McClure; Terence Stamp
- Cinematography: Geoffrey Unsworth; Robert Paynter
- Edited by: John Victor-Smith
- Music by: Ken Thorne (Note: From Original Material composed by John Williams)
- Production companies: Dovemead Ltd.; International Film Production
- Distributed by: Warner Bros.
- Release dates: December 4, 1980 (Australia); April 9, 1981 (UK); June 19, 1981 (US)
- Running time: 127 minutes
- Countries: United Kingdom; United States
- Language: English
- Budget: $54 million
- Box office: $216.3 million

Superman II is a 1980 superhero film based on the DC Comics character Superman, portrayed by Christopher Reeve. It is the second installment in the Superman film series and a sequel to the 1978 film. It was directed by Richard Lester and written by Mario Puzo and David and Leslie Newman from a story by Puzo. The returning cast also includes Gene Hackman, Terence Stamp, Ned Beatty, Sarah Douglas, Margot Kidder, Marc McClure, Jackie Cooper, and Jack O'Halloran. The film's plot features the arrival of General Zod and his comrades on Earth, following their release from the Phantom Zone (a prison that had been made by the people of Krypton). Zod seeks revenge for imprisonment by pursuing the planet's last son, Kal-El, alias "Superman". As a result, Kal-El, who had unknowingly freed them, must now face threats from his long-dead home planet. Zod also allies with Lex Luthor, who still aspires to world domination. The hero also faces an internal conflict, torn between his duties as Earth's hero and his desire to live amongst them solely as Clark Kent, and especially with his love interest, Lois Lane.

In 1977, producers Alexander and Ilya Salkind decided that they would film Superman and its sequel simultaneously; principal photography began in March 1977 and ended in October 1978. Tensions rose between original director Richard Donner and the producers, as a result of which a decision was made to stop filming the sequel, 75 percent of which had already been completed, and simply finish the first film. After the release of Superman in December 1978, Donner was fired as director and replaced by Lester. Several members of the cast and crew declined to return to complete the sequel in the wake of Donner's firing. In order to be officially credited as the director, Lester re-shot most of the film: principal photography resumed in September 1979 and ended in March 1980.

Superman II was released in Australia and most of Europe on December 4, 1980, and in other countries in 1981. It received positive reviews from film critics, who praised the performances of Hackman, Kidder, Stamp, and Reeve, as well as the visual effects and the humor. It grossed $216 million worldwide against a production budget of $54 million, which meant it was a box office success, albeit less so than its predecessor. A sequel, Superman III, was released in June 1983, for which Lester returned as director. A director's cut of Superman II, restoring the original vision for the film under Donner's supervision, titled Superman II: The Richard Donner Cut, was released on November 28, 2006, in various home media formats.

== Plot ==
Before the destruction of Krypton, (Note: As depicted in the 1978 film Superman.) the criminals General Zod, Ursa and Non are sentenced to banishment into the Phantom Zone. Years later, the Phantom Zone is shattered near Earth by the shockwave of a hydrogen bomb, thrown from Earth by Superman. The three criminals are freed and find themselves with superpowers granted by the yellow light of the Sun. After landing on the Moon and effortlessly killing a team of astronauts exploring there, they continue toward Earth with plans to conquer the planet.

The Daily Planet sends journalist Clark Kent—whose secret identity is Superman—and his colleague Lois Lane to Niagara Falls. Lois suspects Clark and Superman are the same person after Clark is absent when Superman saves a child. Lois intentionally jumps into the river, but Clark saves her without exposing himself. That night, Clark trips, and his hand lands in a lit fireplace. When Lois sees that his hand is unscathed, Clark reveals that he is indeed Superman. He takes her to his Fortress of Solitude in the Arctic, showing her the traces of his past stored within energy crystals. Superman declares his love for Lois and his wish to spend his life with her. After conferring with the hologram of his mother, Lara, Superman removes his superpowers by exposing himself to red Kryptonian sunlight in a crystal chamber, becoming a mortal. Clark and Lois spend the night together, then leave the Fortress and return from the Arctic.

Meanwhile, Zod and his cohorts travel to the White House and force the President of the United States to surrender. Clark and Lois arrive at a diner in Alaska, where a trucker named Rocky sexually harasses Lois and beats Clark to a bloody pulp. While Lois tries to help Clark with his wounds, the President makes a televised speech, which is interrupted by Zod. Clark looks up at the TV and realizes that Zod, Ursa, and Non have taken over the planet. The President then asks for Superman's help, and Zod challenges Superman. Clark realizes that he made a terrible mistake and returns to the Fortress to restore his powers.

Lex Luthor escapes from prison with Eve Teschmacher's help. They infiltrate the Fortress of Solitude, and Luthor learns of Superman's connection to Jor-El and General Zod. He finds Zod at the White House and tells him Superman is the son of Jor-El, their jailer, and offers to lead him to Superman in exchange for control of Australia. The three Kryptonians ally with Luthor and go to the Daily Planet. Superman arrives and battles the three. Zod realizes that Superman cares for the humans and takes advantage by threatening bystanders. Superman realizes the only way to stop Zod and the others is to lure them to the Fortress, so he flies off with Zod, Ursa, and Non in pursuit, kidnapping Lois and taking along Luthor. Superman tries to get Luthor to lure the three into the crystal chamber to depower them. However, Luthor reveals the chamber's secret to the villains. Zod forces Superman into the chamber and activates it. Afterwards, assuming him deprived of his powers, Zod tells Superman to kneel, take his hand, and swear eternal loyalty to him; instead, Superman crushes Zod's hand and tosses him into a crevice. Luthor deduces that Superman reconfigured the chamber to expose the trio to red sunlight while Superman was protected from it. Non falls into another crevice when trying to fly over it, and Lois knocks Ursa into a third. Superman flies back to civilization, returning Lois home and leaving Lex stranded in the Fortress.

At the Daily Planet the following day, Clark kisses Lois, using his abilities to wipe her mind of the knowledge of her past few days. Later, he returns to the diner, gets revenge on Rocky, and humiliates him. Superman restores the damage done by Zod, replacing the American flag atop the White House, and tells the President he will not abandon his duty again.

== Cast ==
- Gene Hackman as Lex Luthor: Criminal genius and Superman's archnemesis. Armed with vast resources and scientific brilliance, Luthor's contempt for mankind is only surpassed by his hatred for Superman. Luthor strikes a bargain with the three Kryptonian criminals in an effort to destroy Superman.
- Christopher Reeve as Clark Kent / Superman: Born on Krypton and raised on Earth, Superman is a being of immense strength, speed, and power. Morally upstanding and instilled with a strong sense of duty, Superman tirelessly uses his formidable powers, which he gets from the Earth's yellow Sun, to protect the people of his adoptive homeworld. His alter ego is mild-mannered Daily Planet reporter Clark Kent. Superman's abilities include: X-ray and heat vision, vast strength, speed, and invulnerability, super-intelligence, and flight.
- Ned Beatty as Otis: Luthor's incompetent henchman.
- Jackie Cooper as Perry White: Mercurial editor-in-chief of the Daily Planet newspaper and Lois and Clark's boss.
- Sarah Douglas as Ursa: Zod's second-in-command and consort. Ursa's evil will and power lust are equal to and sometimes surpass those of General Zod. Her contempt and utter disregard for humans, men in particular, make her a very deadly adversary. She has an inclination to collect insignia and heraldry from people she defeats or dominates, such as the NASA patch from the EVA suit of an astronaut she kills.
- Margot Kidder as Lois Lane: The ace reporter for the Daily Planet and Superman's love interest. Lois is a driven career journalist who lets nothing stand in the way of breaking the next big story and scooping rival reporters while ignoring the potential consequences that sometimes put her in peril. She finds out that Clark is Superman, but her memory is erased when Clark kisses her.
- Jack O'Halloran as Non: The third of the Kryptonian criminals, Non is "as without thought as he is without voice." At 7 ft (2.1 m) tall, Non is a formidable hulking mute who easily matches Superman's strength, but has the intelligence and sometimes curiosity of a child, and communicates only with guttural grunts and growls. Though he lacks the mental ability to use his powers effectively, he does, however, possess the same taste for destruction as his Kryptonian companions, and his physical strength is even greater than Zod and Ursa's.
- Valerie Perrine as Eve Teschmacher: Lex Luthor's beautiful assistant and girlfriend who helps him escape from prison.
- Susannah York as Lara: Jor-El's wife and Superman's biological mother.
- Clifton James as Sheriff.
- E.G. Marshall as the President of the United States.
- Marc McClure as Jimmy Olsen: Young photographer at the Daily Planet.
- Terence Stamp as General Zod: The ruthless, arrogant and megalomaniacal leader of three Kryptonian criminals banished to the Phantom Zone and unwittingly set free by Superman. Zod, upon landing on Earth and gaining the same superpowers as Superman, immediately views humans as a weak and insignificant subspecies and imposes his evil will for world dominance. However, his arrogance causes him to quickly become bored with his powers, and he is almost disappointed at how little of a challenge humans are. His insatiable lust for power is replaced, however, by revenge when he learns that the son of Jor-El stands in the way of his absolute rule of the planet.

According to the 2006 documentary You Will Believe: The Cinematic Saga of Superman, Sarah Douglas was the only cast member to do extensive around-the-world press tours in support of the film and was one of the few actors who held a neutral point of view in the Donner–Lester controversy.

Richard Donner briefly appears in a "walking cameo" in the film. In the sequence where the de-powered Clark and Lois are seen approaching the truck-stop diner by car, Donner appears walking "camera left" past the driver's side. He is wearing a light tan jacket and appears to be smoking a pipe. In his commentary for Superman II, Ilya Salkind states that the inclusion of his cameo in that scene is proof that the Salkinds held no animosity towards Donner, because if there were, then surely they would have cut it out. Conversely, Donner used his cameo to debunk praise heaped on Lester around the release of the film, where Lester took credit for the intense nature of the "bully" scene in the diner, pointing out that he (Donner) filmed the scene and not Lester.

== Production history ==
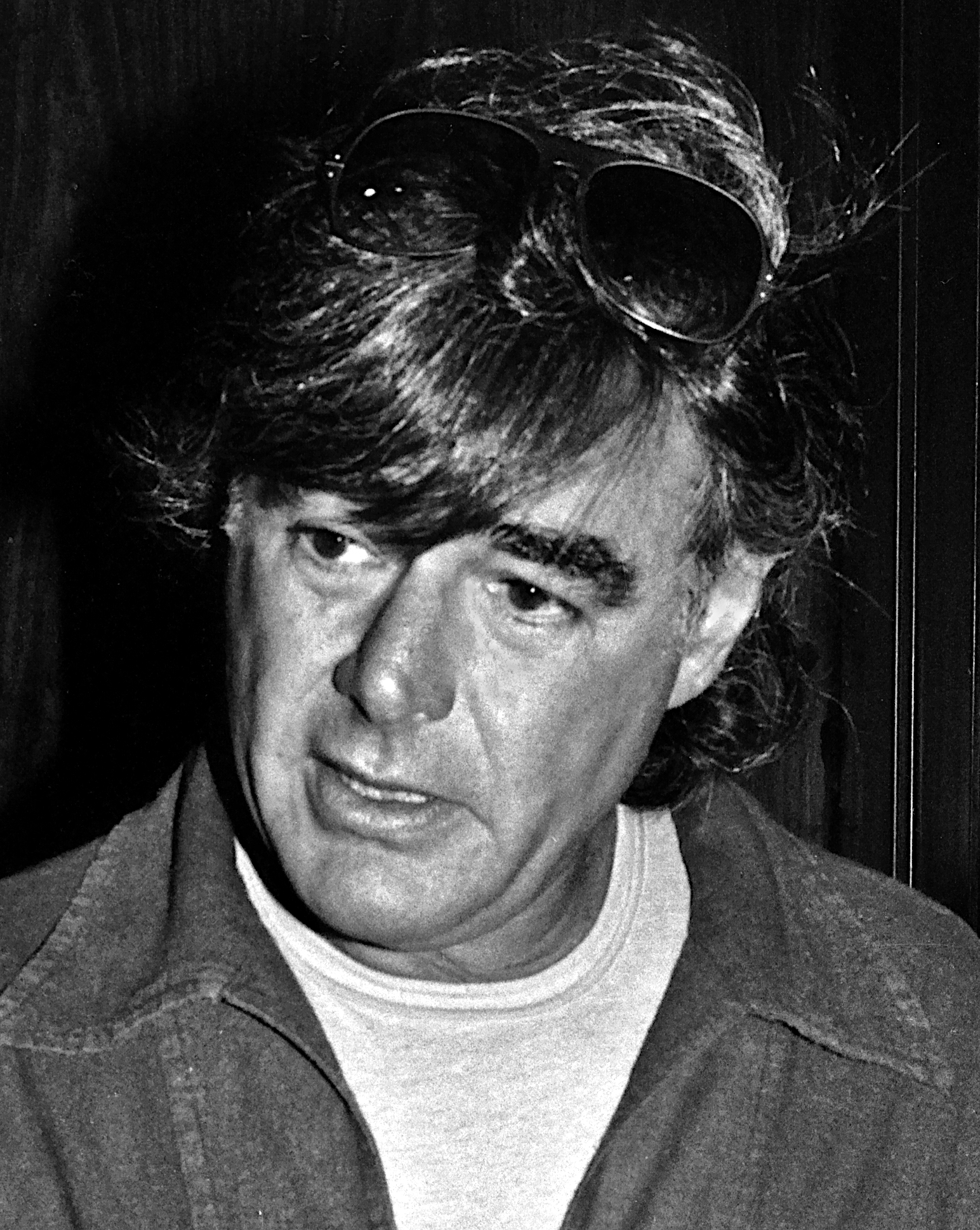
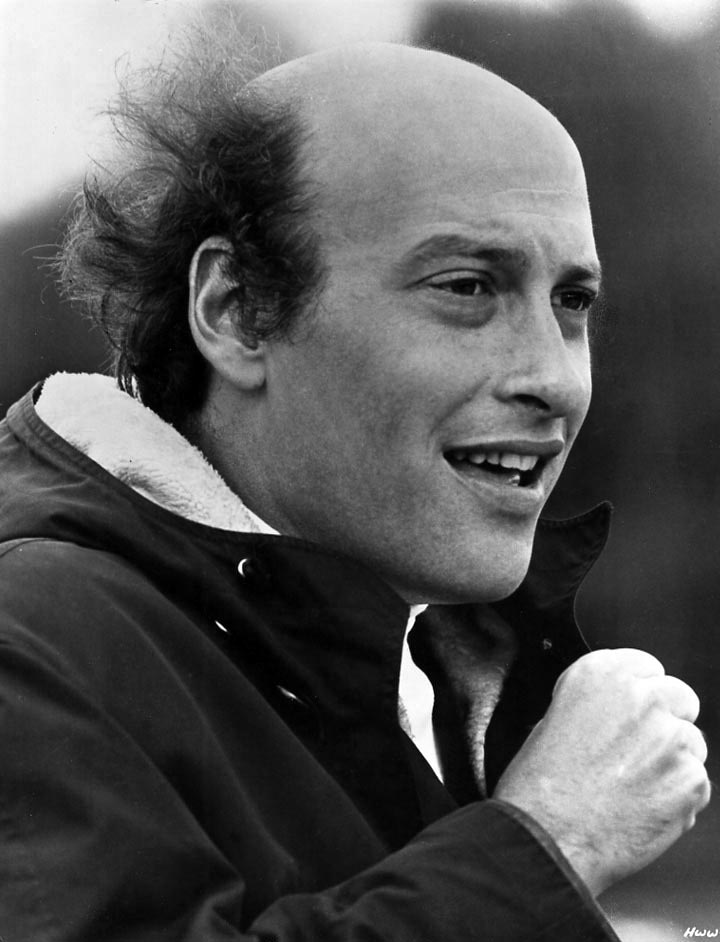
The film's original director, Richard Donner (left, pictured in 1979), was fired during production in 1979 and was replaced by Richard Lester (right, pictured in 1967).

=== Original production ===
Principal photography for both Superman films began on March 28, 1977, at Pinewood Studios for the Krypton scenes, but by May 1977, production had run two weeks behind schedule. It was reported that Donner had developed tensions with Alexander and Ilya Salkind and Pierre Spengler concerning the escalating production budget and production schedule. Donner responded by claiming he was never given a budget.

In July 1977, Richard Lester—who had previously directed The Three Musketeers (1973) and The Four Musketeers (1974) for the Salkinds—came on board the project as an uncredited associate producer and intermediary on Superman to mediate the relationship between Donner and the Salkinds, who were no longer on speaking terms. Before this, Lester had won a lawsuit against the Salkinds for money still owed to him from making the films, but the assets were held in legal entanglements in the Bahamas. The Salkinds then offered to compensate him if he would help on the Superman films, in which Lester became a second unit director, where he and Donner formed an effective partnership.

By October 1977, Gene Hackman, Ned Beatty, and Valerie Perrine had completed their scenes. They were all under contract to finish both pictures. Nevertheless, with months left of filming, the Salkinds had halted filming Superman II, of which Donner had shot 75 percent, to focus on finishing Superman. During the pause in filming, the Salkinds agreed to a negative pickup deal with Warner Bros. Pictures, granting the studio rights to foreign distribution and television airings in exchange for more financing.

Mario Puzo, David and Leslie Newman were again credited as screenwriters. Robert Benton was the only one of the first film's screenwriters not to be credited for the sequel.

=== Replacing Richard Donner ===
When Superman was released in December 1978, Spengler encountered Variety columnist Army Archerd at a Christmas party at which he confirmed that while there had been tension between him and Donner, he was proud of the film and looked forward to working with him on the sequel. Archerd then contacted Donner, who responded, "If he's on it—I'm not." Two days after the first film's general release, Marlon Brando had sued the Salkinds for $50 million claiming he had never received his percentage of the film's gross and filed a restraining order to prevent the use of his likeness. While his restraining order request was thrown out, Brando received $15 million from the settlement.

Afterwards, the Salkinds announced that Brando's completed scenes for Superman II would be excised from the movie to avoid having to pay the actor the reported 11.75% of gross U.S. box-office takings he was now demanding for his performance in the sequel. In addition to this, Ilya Salkind had also claimed Brando was removed due to creative differences, in which he suggested to his father: "What if it's the mother [instead]? She talks about love to her son. And it kind of made sense creatively....Jor-El had done his thing if you want." Donner publicly lambasted this decision, in which he told Variety, "That means no games... They have to want me to do it. It has to be on my terms, and I don't mean financially. I mean control."

As Donner had become unavailable while promoting Superman in Europe, the Salkinds approached Guy Hamilton to take over as director for Superman II since Lester was filming Cuba (1979) at the time. Hamilton was unavailable, but by the time Superman II was ready to resume filming, Lester had completed Cuba and was available to direct. Eventually, on March 15, 1979, the Salkinds decided to replace Donner with Richard Lester. Donner recalled, "One day, I got a telegram from them saying my services are no longer needed and that my dear friend Richard Lester would take over. To this day, I have not heard from them." Ilya Salkind countered, "Dick Donner said, 'I will do the second movie on my terms and without [Pierre] Spengler' ... Spengler was my friend since childhood, and my father and I were very loyal guys. We said no, and it really boiled down to that."

The decision to replace Donner was controversial amongst the cast and crew. Creative consultant Tom Mankiewicz was approached by Terry Semel, then a Warner Bros. vice president, to return for the sequel, but he declined out of loyalty to Donner. Mankiewicz recounted, "I have a lot of respect for [Lester]. Friendship is more important than anything. And Dick [Donner] brought me on the picture, and my loyalty was with Dick, and I couldn't believe that they fired him." Editor Stuart Baird also declined to return for the sequel. Gene Hackman declined to return for re-shoots, which necessitated the use of a body double and a voice impersonator for several scenes.

=== Production under Richard Lester ===
To replace Mankiewicz, David and Leslie Newman were then brought back to retool the script, constructing a new opening and ending. The new script featured newly conceived scenes such as a new opening involving Superman thwarting the nuclear terrorists at the Eiffel Tower, Clark rescuing Lois at Niagara Falls, and a new ending in which Clark causes Lois to forget his secret identity through a hypnotic kiss.

Furthermore, cinematographer Geoffrey Unsworth had died before the release of Superman. Now, director Lester was not sympathetic to Donner's filmmaking style: "Donner was emphasizing a kind of grandiose myth. There was a kind of David Lean-ish attempt in several sequences, and an enormous scale. There was a type of epic quality which isn't in my nature, so my work really didn't embrace that...That's not me. That's his vision of it. I'm more quirky, and I play around with slightly more unexpected silliness." Lester then hired cinematographer Robert Paynter to have the film evoke the garish color scheme of the comics. In their review, Variety noted that Superman II retained the light-suffused photography by Unsworth. In the final credits, Unsworth received the prime lensing credit, "photographed by", with Paynter credited afterwards as the director of photography.

Another replacement happened when production designer John Barry suddenly collapsed on the nearby set of The Empire Strikes Back (1980) and died from meningitis. Peter Murton was then hired in Barry's place.

Before filming was to begin, Christopher Reeve was initially unavailable as he had agreed to star in the film Somewhere in Time (1980). Five months into the production shutdown, his contract to shoot both Superman films back-to-back expired. Reeve told the Los Angeles Times in the twelve hours after his casting was announced, he received a letter from the Salkinds to be available for Superman II on July 16, 1979, which was only five days after he was to finish filming Somewhere in Time. In March 1979, the Salkinds filed suit against Reeve, alleging he had breached his contract by walking off the sequel. Furthermore, Reeve had reservations with Lester and the Newmans' script following Donner's removal. While his contract was renegotiated, Reeve agreed to the financial terms but demanded more artistic control.

Filming for Superman II resumed in September 1979 at Pinewood Studios. The remaining sequences left to be shot included the scenes of the super-villains in Midwest America and the battle in Metropolis. With Brando cut from the film, the decision was made to re-shoot the scene in which Clark confesses his love for Lois and surrenders his powers. Another scene, as written in the film's original shooting script and shot, was to have Jor-El restore his superpowers by reaching out to him in a tableau reminiscent of the painting The Creation of Adam, but the younger Salkind felt it was over the top. The first scene was re-shot with actress Susannah York taking Brando's place while the restoration of Superman's powers would take place off-screen.

Location shooting took place in Canada, Paris, Norway, and Saint Lucia. The Metropolis scenes—in contrast to the first film, where they were filmed on location in New York—were filmed entirely on the back lot at Pinewood. The East Houston, Idaho scenes were shot on Chobham Common in Surrey, 30 miles from London. Throughout filming, Lester opted to retain his directorial technique for the three-camera setup while shooting scenes, which frustrated the actors as they did not know from where they were being filmed for their close-ups. However, Reeve noted that it made the production move at a faster pace. Filming was completed on March 10, 1980.

Due to budgetary reasons and actors being unavailable, key scenes filmed by Donner were added to the final film. Since the Lester footage was shot two years later, continuity errors are present in the physique and styling of stars Margot Kidder and Christopher Reeve. In Donner's footage, Reeve appears less bulked as he was still gaining muscle for the part. Kidder also has dramatic changes throughout; in the montage of Lester–Donner material, shot inside the Daily Planet and the Fortress of Solitude near the movie's conclusion, her hairstyle, hair color, and even make-up are all inconsistent. Kidder's physical appearance in the Lester footage is noticeably different; during the scenes shot for Donner, she appears slender, whereas in the Lester footage, she looks thinner.

Before Superman II was released, Warner Bros. had appealed to the Directors Guild of America (DGA) to arbitrate the proper co-director credit. The DGA argued Lester could not be credited unless he shot 40 percent of the film. Although Lester had initially thought he would not be credited, he nevertheless approached Donner and asked if he wanted to be credited as co-director. Donner replied, "I don't share credit".

== Music ==
Composer John Williams was originally slated to score Superman II, whereby he was given a screening with Ilya Salkind and Richard Lester. When Salkind left the projection room, Williams and Lester fell into an argument; when Salkind returned, Williams told him that he "could not get along with this man." To take his place, Richard Lester's frequent composer Ken Thorne was selected to score the sequel. Thorne wrote minimal original material and adapted source music, such as Average White Band's "Pick Up the Pieces," which appears both in the restaurant in Idaho and during Clark's second encounter with Rocky in the Alaska diner. The music was performed at the CTS Studios, Wembley, London, in the Spring of 1980 by a studio session orchestra (rather than the London Symphony Orchestra, which had played for the first film). The soundtrack was released on Warner Bros. Records, with one edition featuring laser-etched "S" designs repeated five times on each side.

A complete score was released in 2008, as part of Superman: The Music--1978-1988, an 8-CD box set released by Film Score Monthly, with a limited edition of 6,000 units.

As part of Superman's 80th anniversary, La-La Land Records released Thorne's expanded orchestral scores for the second and third film into the expanded archival collection in October 2018.

== Release ==
During a preview of the finished film, Warner Bros. executives had hoped to maximize its box office returns by releasing the film in every part of the world during their peak movie-going period. The film premiered in Australia on Thursday, December 4, 1980, and opened at the weekend in South Africa, followed by France on December 10 with Christmastime releases in Italy and Spain. The film opened in the United Kingdom and West Germany in Easter 1981. On June 1, 1981, the film premiered at the National Theater in New York City, and received its general release in 1,354 theaters in the United States and Canada on June 19—six months after its release in other parts of the world.

=== Marketing ===
To promote the film, The New York Times reported that Warner Bros. had licensees for 34 products, including posters, Pepsi-Cola, pajamas, and T-shirts with Superman carrying the American flag. They had also enlisted their publishing division to produce calendars, pop-up books, a film novelization, a behind-the-scenes book, and a children's dictionary.

Before production on Superman II resumed in 1979, the Philip Morris Company had paid $40,000 (£30,570) for their Marlboro cigarette to appear in the film. Lois Lane was shown as a chain smoker in the film, although she never smoked in the comic book. During the Metropolis battle, General Zod throws Superman into a Marlboro delivery truck, although actual vehicles for tobacco distribution are unmarked for security reasons. This led to a congressional investigation.

== Reception ==
=== Critical response ===
On the review aggregator website Rotten Tomatoes, Superman II has an approval rating of 89% based on 114 reviews, with an average rating of 7.6/10. The site's critics consensus reads, "The humor occasionally stumbles into slapstick territory, and the special effects are dated, but Superman II meets, if not exceeds, the standard set by its predecessor." On Metacritic, the film has a weighted average score of 83 out of 100, based on 16 critics, indicating "universal acclaim". Audiences polled by CinemaScore during its opening weekend gave the film a rare average grade of "A+" on an A+ to F scale.

Variety noted that despite its production issues, it had "finally emerged as a solid, classy, cannily constructed piece of entertainment". They felt that there was "little in the way of any director's personal stamp on the sequel, though Lester has done a bravura job of melding grandiose action with a core of heart-tickling romance and an ample overlay of tongue-in-cheek humor. Whether he or the script bears primary blame for some of the campier low-comedy excesses that the original managed to avoid is an open question". Roger Ebert of the Chicago Sun-Times, who gave the original film very high acclaim, also praised Superman II, giving it four out of four stars. He wrote in his review, "This movie's most intriguing insight is that Superman's disguise as Clark Kent isn't a matter of looks as much as of mental attitude: Clark is disguised not by his glasses but by his ordinariness. Beneath his meek exterior, of course, is concealed a superhero. And, the movie subtly hints, isn't that the case with us all?" Gene Siskel of the Chicago Tribune awarded three-and-a-half out of four stars and declared it "better than the original." Sheila Benson of the Los Angeles Times called it "the most interesting 'Superman' yet," adding, "This film's fun comes from character, dialogue and performance, not effects. There are, of course, enough effects to fill a dozen Saturday matinee serials, but they aren't necessarily the film's deliciousness."

Janet Maslin, reviewing for The New York Times, wrote that "Superman II is a marvelous toy. It's funny, it's full of tricks, and it manages to be royally entertaining, which is really all it aims for." She also praised the performances of Reeve and Hackman and found the directing style of Donner and Lester to be indistinguishable. Similarly, David Denby, reviewing for the New York magazine, praised the film's light approach and Hackman's performance. Christopher John, reviewing the film in Ares Magazine, commented that "Superman II falls into the category of sequels containing such films as Jaws 2 - highly absorbing and entertaining, yet better films only if you never saw the original."

C. J. Henderson reviewed Superman II for Pegasus magazine and stated that "Superman II was a booming box office smash but only with the kids. The adults who were pleased to see their childhood hero so well-treated in the first movie were sorely disappointed by the second."

Dave Kehr said in the Chicago Reader that the film is a "big, generous, beautifully crafted entertainment" that succeeded in "never degenerating into the facile camp of Richard Donner's part one", and "our emotional involvement with the characters is kept at a high level"

British cinema magazine Total Film named Terence Stamp's version of General Zod No. 32 on their 'Top 50 Greatest Villains of All Time' list (beating out the No. 38 place of Lex Luthor) in 2007. Pop culture website IGN placed General Zod at No. 30 on their list of the 'Top 50 Comic Book Villains' while commenting "Stamp is Zod" (emphasis in original).

=== Box office ===
The film opened on 19 screens in Australia and grossed A$287,072 in its first four days. On its opening weekend in the United States and Canada, Superman II broke box office records with a first day gross of $4.3 million. The next day, it grossed $5.5 million, which at the time was the highest single-day box office day, surpassing the record previously set by Star Wars (1977) with $4.5 million. It also recorded the highest-grossing weekend up to that time with $14.1 million, surpassing the record $11.9 million set by Star Trek: The Motion Picture (1979) and the $13.1 million 4-day weekend set by Superman in its third weekend.

The film remained number one for the next three weekends, outpacing Raiders of the Lost Ark, but Raiders eventually overtook it and returned to number one in its sixth week of release. In its first month of release, Superman II had grossed $75 million, and went on to gross $108.2 million in the United States and Canada (with the gross rental coming to $65 million), the third highest-grossing film of 1981. Internationally, it grossed $108.2 million for a worldwide total of $216.3 million.

== Awards and nominations ==
Year	Award	Category	Recipient	Result
1982	Saturn Awards	Best Science Fiction Film	Superman II	Won
1982	Saturn Awards	Best Actor	Christopher Reeve	Nominated
1982	Saturn Awards	Best Actress	Margot Kidder	Nominated
1982	Saturn Awards	Best Music	Ken Thorne	Nominated

== Broadcast television versions ==
As with the first film, Alexander and Ilya Salkind prepared a version for worldwide television release that re-inserted unused footage (in this case, 24 minutes) into the film. It was through this extended version that viewers first caught a glimpse into the Superman II that might have happened had Richard Donner remained as director. In fact, a majority of the added footage was shot by Donner before Richard Lester became director.

17 of the 24 added minutes were used by ABC for its 1984 network premiere. Subsequent ABC airings of the longer version were cut further for more advertising time. The full 151-minute extended cut was shown internationally, including parts of Canada.

=== Additional footage ===
The added footage offers an alternative ending to the film. In the theatrical cut, it is implied that Superman has killed the three Kryptonian villains (going against the strict code that Superman does not kill). In the extended ending, a U.S. "polar patrol" is shown picking up the three Kryptonians and Lex Luthor, after which Superman, with Lois standing beside him, destroys the Fortress of Solitude.

Among the other "lost" scenes:

- Superman passes a Concorde jet on his way to Paris. This is not in the video release and was actually an outtake from Superman: The Movie as a bridge between Superman saving Air Force One and his conversation with Jor-El after his first night.
- At the end of the film, Clark Kent bumps into a large bald man, which reminds him to go to the diner to face the obnoxious trucker who beat him up earlier.
- The Phantom Zone villains land outside the Fortress of Solitude with Lex Luthor and Lois Lane, trying to figure out how to get in.
- Extended scenes of the three Kryptonians' invasion of the White House, with Zod using a gun and Non frightening a dog.
- Superman cooks a soufflé using his heat vision, during dinner with Lois at the Fortress of Solitude.
- Extended discussion between Zod and Ursa on the Moon.
- In East Houston, a boy tries to escape on horseback, only to be killed by Non, who throws a police siren at him.

Some telecast versions remove the following content:

- Much violence in the opening White House scene was left out, including Zod murdering several Secret Service agents and Capitol Police officers with an AR-10 assault rifle.
- The bully's line in the bar ("I don't like your meat anyway!" was re-edited to "I don't like you anyway.").
- About 35 seconds of the "Battle of Metropolis" (Superman flying over Metropolis River) were deleted.
- Some language and profanity were re-dubbed.

Among the footage seen in the international/Canadian telecasts:

- A girl in Japan watches the destruction of East Houston on TV to the disapproval of her father, who believes it's a violent TV show.
- Longer conversation between Lois and Superman after he destroys the Fortress of Solitude.
- Lex Luthor taking Perry White's coffee during the Times Square battle.
- Lex and Miss Teschmacher are admiring the Fortress of Solitude.
- Lex's negotiating with Superman after they leave the fortress is longer.
- Zod and his cronies are being arrested by Arctic Patrol officers.

In 2004, the fan-restored DVD known as Superman II: Restored International Cut was released through many Superman fan sites. It featured extended scenes pulled from international television broadcasts over the years. Warner Bros. threatened legal action over the bootleg release.

== The Richard Donner Cut ==
During the production of Superman Returns, Warner Bros. acquired the rights from Marlon Brando's estate to use the late actor's footage from Superman in the film. Shortly after, Ilya Salkind confirmed that Donner was involved in the project to re-cut Superman II using Brando's unused footage. Editor Michael Thau worked on the project alongside Donner and Tom Mankiewicz, who supervised the Superman II reconstruction. Despite some initial confusion, Thau confirmed that all the footage shot by Donner in 1977 was recovered and transferred from a vault in England.

The new edition, titled Superman II: The Richard Donner Cut, was released on DVD, HD DVD, and Blu-ray on November 28, 2006. In order to make Donner's vision of Superman II feel less incomplete, finished scenes by Lester that Donner was unable to shoot were incorporated into the film, as well as the screen tests by Reeve and Kidder for one pivotal scene. The film also restores several cut scenes, including Marlon Brando as Jor-El, an alternate prologue and opening sequence at the Daily Planet that omits the Eiffel Tower opening from the original, as well as the original scripted and filmed ending for Superman II featuring Superman reversing time before it was cut and placed at the end of the first film.

== In other media ==
=== Comics ===
- Superman's publisher DC Comics published a commemorative magazine of Superman II in 1981. Published as DC Special Series #25, it was produced in "Treasury format" and included photos and background photos, actor profiles, panel-to-scene comparisons, and pin-ups.
- In 2006, the Superman comics themselves adapted elements from the Superman movies, specifically the ice-like look of Krypton, and Jor-El banishing the criminals to the Phantom Zone. Ursa and Non made their first appearances in the comic book continuity. (This was facilitated in the "Last Son" story arc, co-written by Richard Donner.)
- In 2021, a Superman comic entitled Superman '78 was released. Written by Robert Venditti and illustrated by Wilfredo Torres, the comic is set in Donnerverse continuity, acting as a continuation.

=== Television ===
- In the television series Smallville, much of the imagery and concepts of the first two Salkind/Donner/Lester Superman films have been revived as a conscious homage to the film series by the show's creators. These include the ice-crystal Fortress of Solitude, the spinning square in space to represent the Phantom Zone, and the continued presence of the deceased Jor-El as a disembodied counselor and teacher to young Clark/Kal-El. Terence Stamp, who played General Zod in the first two films, provided the voice of Jor-El for the series. Christopher Reeve made two appearances on the show as Dr. Virgil Swann, a disabled scientist who had acquired knowledge of Krypton to pass on to Clark, before Reeve died in 2004. A section of John Williams' Superman theme was included when Reeve made his first appearance, and was later used in the series finale. Margot Kidder, Marc McClure (Jimmy Olsen), and Helen Slater (Supergirl) have also made appearances on the show. Annette O'Toole (Lana Lang in Superman III) played Martha Kent.

== Bibliography ==
- Andersen, Christopher (2008). Somewhere in Heaven: The Remarkable Love Story of Dana and Christopher Reeve. Hyperion. ISBN 978-0-7868-9130-6.
- Mankiewicz, Tom; Crane, Robert (2012). My Life as a Mankiewicz: An Insider's Journey through Hollywood. University Press of Kentucky. ISBN 978-0-8131-6123-5.
- Rossen, Jake (2008). Superman vs. Hollywood: How Fiendish Producers, Devious Directors, and Warring Writers Grounded an American Icon. Chicago Review Press. ISBN 978-1-55652-731-9.
- Scivally, Bruce (2008). Superman On Film: Film, Television, Radio And Broadway. McFarland & Company. ISBN 978-0-7864-3166-3.
- Tye, Larry (2013). Superman: The High-Flying History of America's Most Enduring Hero. Random House Trade Paperbacks. ISBN 978-0-8129-8077-6.
- Weldon, Glen (2013). Superman: The Unauthorized Biography. Wiley. ISBN 978-1-118-34184-1.
