= Superman III =

1983 film by Richard Lester

- Theatrical release poster
- Directed by: Richard Lester
- Screenplay by: David Newman; Leslie Newman
- Based on: Superman by Jerry Siegel and Joe Shuster
- Produced by: Pierre Spengler
- Starring: Christopher Reeve; Richard Pryor; Jackie Cooper; Marc McClure; Annette O'Toole; Annie Ross; Pamela Stephenson; Robert Vaughn; Margot Kidder
- Cinematography: Robert Paynter
- Edited by: John Victor-Smith
- Music by: Ken Thorne (Note: Original Superman themes by John Williams)
- Production company: Dovemead Ltd.
- Distributed by: Warner Bros.
- Release dates: June 17, 1983 (United States); July 19, 1983 (United Kingdom)
- Running time: 125 minutes
- Countries: United Kingdom; United States
- Language: English
- Budget: $39 million
- Box office: $80.2 million

Superman III is a 1983 superhero film based on the DC Comics character Superman, portrayed by Christopher Reeve. It is the third installment in the Superman film series and the sequel to Superman II (1980). Directed by Richard Lester and written by David and Leslie Newman, the film stars Reeve, Richard Pryor, Jackie Cooper, Marc McClure, Annette O'Toole, Annie Ross, Pamela Stephenson, Robert Vaughn, and Margot Kidder. In the film, Superman battles Ross Webster, a corrupt businessman who has constructed a powerful supercomputer to kill him.

Superman III was released in the United States on June 17, 1983. The film proved less successful than its predecessors, both critically and financially, grossing $80.2 million worldwide. A sequel, Superman IV: The Quest for Peace, was released in 1987.

== Plot ==
The conglomerate Webscoe Industries hires computer programmer Gus Gorman, who secretly embezzles $85,000 from the company payroll. He comes to the attention of Webscoe's CEO, Ross Webster. A cunning billionaire fixated on using technology for financial domination, Webster sees Gus's skills as a valuable asset. With the help of his stern sister, Vera, and his mistress Lorelei Ambrosia, he blackmails Gus into aiding his schemes.

Clark Kent, accompanied by Jimmy Olsen, returns to Smallville for his high school reunion. Along the way Clark—as Superman—extinguishes a fire in a chemical plant. Jimmy is injured during the fire and is taken to hospital. In Smallville, Clark reconnects with childhood friend Lana Lang, who has a young son named Ricky. Superman later saves the boy from a combine harvester during a picnic with Lana.

Webster orders Gus to use the weather satellite 'Vulcan' to create a storm that destroys coffee crops in Colombia, aiming to corner the market. Gus complies, but Superman neutralizes the storm. Recognizing the hero as a threat, Webster orders Gus to synthesize Kryptonite. When the computer fails to recognize the total chemical composition, he substitutes tar for the unknown elements. Lana invites Superman to Ricky's birthday party. Gus and Vera infiltrate the party, giving Superman the synthetic Kryptonite, which leaves him unharmed, to their confusion. Instead, he gradually becomes corrupted after exposure to it, committing sophomoric acts such as straightening the Leaning Tower of Pisa and blowing out the Olympic Flame.

Gus proposes building a supercomputer for Webster in exchange for creating an energy crisis by redirecting oil tankers. Lorelei seduces Superman and manipulates him into causing an oil spill. Superman suffers a nervous breakdown and splits into two beings: the corrupted Superman and Clark Kent. The two fight, and Clark defeats his corrupted counterpart by strangling him to death. The renewed Superman then repairs the damage from the oil spill. After surviving exploding rockets and a missile, Superman confronts Webster, Vera, and Lorelei in the supercomputer. The computer becomes self-aware and defends itself against attempts to disable it as it transforms Vera into a cyborg. Vera then attacks Webster and Lorelei with energy beams that immobilize them. Superman retrieves a can of acid from the chemical plant and uses it to destroy the computer. Superman hands Webster, Vera and Lorelei to the authorities. Gus starts anew in West Virginia.

Meanwhile, Clark visits Lana in Metropolis, where she begins working as a secretary for Perry White. Lois Lane returns from Bermuda with an exposé on corruption, and Superman restores the Leaning Tower of Pisa before flying into space.

== Cast ==
- Christopher Reeve as Clark Kent / Superman: After discovering his origins, he makes it his mission to help the Earth. Superman battles megalomaniac Ross Webster, who attempts to control the global coffee and oil supply.
- Richard Pryor as Gus Gorman: A bumbling computer genius who works for Ross Webster and becomes linked with his plan to destroy Superman.
- Jackie Cooper as Perry White: The editor of the Daily Planet.
- Marc McClure as Jimmy Olsen: A photographer for the Daily Planet.
- Annette O'Toole as Lana Lang: Clark's high school friend who reconciles with Clark during their high school reunion. O'Toole later portrayed Martha Kent on the television series Smallville.
- Paul Kaethler as Ricky, Lana's son.
- Annie Ross as Vera Webster: Sister and partner of Ross in his company and plans.
- Pamela Stephenson as Lorelei Ambrosia: Ross's assistant and mistress/girlfriend. Lorelei is skilled in computers but hides her intelligence from Ross and Vera. As part of Ross's plan, she seduces Superman.
- Robert Vaughn as Ross Webster: A villainous, wealthy industrialist and philanthropist. After Superman prevents him from taking over the world's coffee supply, Ross is determined to destroy Superman before he can stop his plan to control the world's oil supply. He is an original character created for the film.
- Margot Kidder as Lois Lane: A reporter at the Daily Planet who has history with both Clark Kent and Superman. She is on vacation in Bermuda.
- Gavan O'Herlihy as Brad Wilson: Lana's ex-boyfriend and Clark's high school bully; now an alcoholic security guard.

Shane Rimmer appears as a state police officer. Pamela Mandell appears as the hapless wife of a Daily Planet sweepstakes winner. Aaron Smolinski, who played young Clark Kent in Superman, appears as the boy next to the photo booth that Clark uses to change into Superman.

== Production ==
=== Development ===
Richard Donner confirmed that he had been interested in writing at least two more Superman films, which he intended Tom Mankiewicz to direct, and use Brainiac as the villain of the third film. Donner departed the series during the production of Superman II. The film was announced at the 33rd Cannes Film Festival in May 1980. In December 1980, producer Ilya Salkind wrote a treatment for this film that included Brainiac, Mister Mxyzptlk and Supergirl. The treatment was released online in 2007. The Mister Mxyzptlk portrayed in the outline varies from his comic counterpart as he uses his abilities to cause chaos. Dudley Moore was the first choice to play the role. In the treatment, Brainiac was from Colu and had discovered Supergirl in the same way that Superman was found by Jonathan and Martha Kent. Brainiac is portrayed as a surrogate father to Supergirl and eventually fell in love with his "daughter," who did not reciprocate his feelings, as she had fallen in love with Superman. Brainiac retaliates by using a personality machine to corrupt and manipulate Superman. The climax of the film would have seen Superman, Supergirl, Jimmy Olsen, Lana Lang and Brainiac time travel to the Middle Ages for a final battle against Brainiac. After defeating him and leaving Brainiac behind, Superman and Supergirl would have married at the end of Superman III or in Superman IV. The treatment was rejected as being too complex and expensive to shoot. Because of the high budgets required for the series, the Salkinds considered selling the rights to the series to Dino De Laurentiis. The significance of computers, the corruption of Superman, and the splitting of Superman into good and evil would be used in the final film. The film was originally intended to be titled Superman vs. Superman, but was retitled after the producers of Kramer vs. Kramer threatened a lawsuit.

=== Casting ===
Both Gene Hackman and Margot Kidder are said to have been angry with the way Ilya and Alexander Salkind treated Superman director Donner, with Hackman retaliating by refusing to reprise the role of Lex Luthor. After Kidder publicly criticized the Salkinds for their treatment of Donner, the producers reportedly punished Kidder by reducing her role in Superman III to a brief appearance. Hackman later denied such claims, stating that he had been busy with other movies and that making Luthor a constant villain would be similar to horror movie sequels where a serial killer keeps coming back. Hackman would reprise his role as Lex Luthor in Superman IV, which the Salkinds had no involvement in. In the commentary for the 2006 DVD release of Superman III, Ilya Salkind denied any negative feelings between Kidder and his production team and denied the claim that her part was cut for retaliation. Instead, he said the creative team decided to pursue a different direction for a love interest for Superman, believing the Lois Lane and Clark Kent relationship had been overdone in the first two films. With the choice to give a more prominent role to Lana Lang, the role of Lois was reduced for story reasons. Salkind also denied the reports about Hackman being upset with him, stating that he was unable to return because of other film commitments.

Though Christopher Reeve had been contracted for seven films as Superman, he engaged a lawyer to renegotiate his contract prior to production. Producer Pierre Spengler described the process of securing Reeve's return as contentious, though Ilya Salkind recalls that Reeve approved of the Superman III script and was more than willing to reprise his role.

After an appearance by Richard Pryor on The Tonight Show, telling Johnny Carson how much he enjoyed seeing Superman and Superman II, and Pryor jokingly stated his desire to appear in a future Superman installment, the Salkinds were eager to cast him in a prominent role in the third film, using the success of Pryor in the films Silver Streak, Stir Crazy and The Toy. Pryor accepted a $5 million salary. Following the release of the film, Pryor signed a five-year contract with Columbia Pictures for $40 million.

=== Filming ===
Principal photography began on June 21, 1982. Most of the interior scenes were shot at Pinewood Studios outside London. The junkyard scene was filmed on the backlot of Pinewood. The coal mine scene was filmed at Battersea Power Station. Most exteriors were filmed in Calgary because of tax breaks for film companies. Superman's drinking was filmed at the St. Louis Hotel in Downtown East Village, Calgary, while other scenes such as the slapstick comedy opening were shot several blocks to the west. While the supercomputer set was created on the 007 Stage, exteriors were shot at Glen Canyon in Utah.

=== Effects and animation ===
The film includes the same special effects team from the first two films. To create the video game computer animation for the missile scene, Time Warner's CEO at the time, Steve Ross, contacted Ray Kassar, the CEO of its subsidiary Atari. Kassar assigned the task to Steve Wright, head of Atari's special project department. Wright worked with Pat Cole and Paul Hughett among others to complete the project. Rather than create high-resolution, realistic computer graphics, they aimed to depict a "video game of the future". The project cost around US$120,000, with between US$95,000–US$100,000 going towards technology hardware. Before the request, Wright had developed a high-end graphics system to quickly create video game prototypes at Atari, which allowed them to create the footage faster than traditional programming in assembly language at the time. The system was a Lisp machine with a Symbolics microprocessor connected to an Ikonus framebuffer, which acted as the graphics chip. The system's software included a paint and animation program to create the graphics and a program to create the scripts that dictate movement and interaction. To complete the setup for the film project, Atari purchased Wright a Matrix film recorder with an Acme 35mm animation camera. Wright approached Carl Rosendahl from computer animation studio PDI to set up and calibrate the newly created recording system.

Production for the video game segment lasted approximately four months, from November 1982 until February 1983. Wright's brother, Larry Wright, served as the segment's art director. The team created storyboards of the sequence beforehand. To plan the necessary computer functions, the storyboards included computer graphic coordinates and geometric symbols to indicate the movement of graphical objects. Vicki Parrish used this information to program the positions of the sprites for Superman and the rockets, as well as scroll the background. The components were placed on different layers and then shifted positions to create a parallax effect to give the appearance of depth, a technique Wright referred to as "2½D". The team generated a low resolution preview to ensure the footage appeared as intended, which took the system about an hour and a half. When satisfied with the preview, the team generated a high-resolution version and applied anti-aliasing to remove jagged edges around the graphics. Each frame was photographed by the camera, which took 120 hours to capture the 1440 frames of graphics. The team created 60 seconds of footage, of which director Richard Lester used around 27 seconds in the final film. The footage was sent to Lester in London. After reviewing it, he requested some changes before the footage was ready to include in the film.

== Music ==
As with the previous sequel, the musical score was composed and conducted by Ken Thorne, using the Superman theme and most other themes from the first film composed by John Williams. Giorgio Moroder was hired to create songs for the film.

The appearance of the cover of Chuck Berry's song Roll Over Beethoven, by the Beatles acts as an indirect reference and connection with A Hard Day's Night and Help!; both were also directed by Richard Lester.

== Release ==
=== Theatrical ===
Superman III was screened at the Uptown Theater in Washington, D.C., on June 12, 1983, and premiered in New York on June 14, 1983, at Cinema I. It was released on June 17, 1983, in the United States and July 19, 1983, in the United Kingdom.

=== Marketing ===
William Kotzwinkle wrote a novelization of the film published by Warner Books in the US and by Arrow Books in the UK; Severn House published a British hardcover edition. Kotzwinkle thought the novelization "a delight the world has yet to find out about." However, writing in Voice of Youth Advocates, Roberta Rogow hoped this would be the final Superman film and said, "Kotzwinkle has done his usual good job of translating the screenplay into a novel, but there are nasty undertones to the film, and there are nasty undertones to the novel as well. Adults may enjoy the novel on its own merits, as a black comedy of sorts, but it's not written for kids, and most of the under-15 crowd will either be puzzled or revolted by Kotzwinkle's dour humor."

=== Extended television edition ===
Like the previous films, a separate extended edition was produced and aired on ABC. The opening credits were in outer space, featuring an edited version of the film's end-credit theme music, serving as an opening theme. This is followed by several scenes, including additional dialogue but not added in any of the official VHS, DVD, or Blu-ray cuts of the film. The Deluxe Edition of Superman III, released in 2006 along with the DVD release of Superman Returns, included these scenes in the extra features section as deleted scenes.

== Reception ==
=== Box office ===
Superman III grossed $60 million at the United States box office, and $20.2 million internationally, for a total of $80.2 million worldwide. The film was the 12th-highest-grossing film of 1983 in North America.

=== Critical response ===
Superman III holds a 31% approval rating on Rotten Tomatoes based on 102 reviews. The critical consensus reads, "When not overusing sight gags, slapstick, and Richard Pryor, Superman III resorts to plot points rehashed from the previous Superman flicks." The film has a Metacritic rating of 44, indicating "mixed or average reviews" from 13 professional reviewers.

Film critic Leonard Maltin said that Superman III was an "appalling sequel that trashed everything that Superman was about for the sake of cheap laughs and a co-starring role for Richard Pryor". The film was nominated for two Golden Raspberry Awards including Worst Supporting Actor for Richard Pryor and Worst Musical Score for Giorgio Moroder at the 4th Golden Raspberry Awards. Audiences also saw Robert Vaughn's villainous Ross Webster as a weak replacement for Lex Luthor.

Christopher John reviewed Superman III in Ares magazine #16 and commented that "compared to the first film in this series, everything about Superman III is a joke, a harsh cruel joke played on all the people who wanted to see more of the Superman they saw a few years ago."

Colin Greenland reviewed Superman III for Imagine magazine, and stated that "What ultimately spoils the fun in Superman III is not the incoherent story or even the technophobia. It is simply overloaded—too many ideas, too many gadgets, too many stars (Pamela Stephenson is completely wasted in a part which would have been too dumb for Goldie Hawn). The wiring all comes loose at the end; an anticlimax, and a rushed one at that."

Fans of the Superman series placed a great deal of the blame on director Richard Lester. Lester made several comedies in the 1960s—including the Beatles' A Hard Day's Night—before being hired by the Salkinds in the 1970s for their successful Three Musketeers series, as well as Superman II which, although better received, was also criticized for unnecessary sight gags and slapstick. Lester broke tradition by setting the opening credits for Superman III during a prolonged slapstick sequence rather than in outer space.

The film's screenplay, by David and Leslie Newman, was also criticized. When Richard Donner was hired to direct the first two films, he rejected the Newman scripts and hired Tom Mankiewicz for heavy rewrites. Since Donner and Mankiewicz were no longer attached, the Salkinds were able to bring their version of Superman to the screen and once again hired the Newmans for writing duties. The performance of Reeve as the corrupted Superman received praise, particularly the junkyard battle between the dark Superman and Clark Kent.
