= Leslie Newman =

American screenwriter (1938–2021)

- Born: 1938; United States
- Died: 2021 (aged 82–83); United States
- Occupation: Screenwriter
- Known for: Wrote the script for the first three Superman films
- Spouse: David Newman (m. 1958; died 2003)
- Children: 2

Leslie Newman (1938 – c. 2021) was a screenwriter who co-wrote the first three Superman films with husband David Newman, who died in 2003. She was born in 1939, in the United States. They had two children together. She has written a novel entitled Gathering Force (Simon & Schuster, 1974), and a cookbook entitled Feasts: Menus for Home-cooked Celebrations (HarperCollins, 1990).

Newman studied at the University of Michigan.

== Filmography ==
- Superman (1978)...co-screenplay
- Superman II (1980)...co-screenplay
- Superman III (1983)...co-screenplay
- Santa Claus: The Movie (1985)...co-story
- Takedown (2000)...co-screenplay
