= David Newman (screenwriter) =

American screenwriter (1937–2003)

- Born: February 4, 1937; New York City, U.S.
- Died: June 27, 2003 (aged 66); New York City, U.S.
- Education: University of Michigan
- Occupation: screenwriter
- Years active: 1965–2003
- Spouse: Leslie Newman (m. 1958)
- Children: 2

David Newman (February 4, 1937 – June 27, 2003) was an American screenwriter. From the late 1960s through the early 1980s he frequently collaborated with Robert Benton. He was married to fellow writer Leslie Newman, with whom he had two children, until his death in 2003 from a stroke.

== Career ==
Newman studied at the University of Michigan. He went to work at Esquire magazine where he met Robert Benton. The two of them wrote Bonnie and Clyde which made them highly in demand in Hollywood. From the University of Michigan GARGAlum Newsletter, 2002: "David Newman, 1958 University of Michigan humor magazine Gargoyle editor, has been nominated for the Academy Award, won the New York Film Critics Award, the National Society of Film Critics Award, and three Writers Guild of America Awards for various screen plays including Bonnie & Clyde [and] Superman … among many others. David received his BA and MA at U of M where he twice won the Avery Hopwood Award. David became an editor at Esquire Magazine. He co-created the Dubious Achievement Awards. He took pride in having coined the phrase: 'Why is this man laughing?' and wished he had copyrighted it."

When Benton became a director, Newman started collaborating with his wife Leslie.

== Works ==
=== Films ===
Year	Title	Credited as	Notes
1967	Bonnie and Clyde	Written by	Co-written with Robert Benton
1970	There Was a Crooked Man...	Written by	Co-written with Robert Benton
1972	What's Up, Doc?	Screenplay by	Story written by Peter Bogdanovich; Screenplay со-written with Robert Benton and Buck Henry
1972	Bad Company	Written by	Co-written with Robert Benton
1977	La fille d'Amérique	Directed by, written by	Co-written with Leslie Newman
1978	Superman	Screenplay by	Based on character (Superman) created by Jerry Siegel and Joe Shuster; Story written by Mario Puzo; Screenplay co-written with Robert Benton, Leslie Newman and Mario Puzo
1980	Superman II	Screenplay by	Based on character (Superman) created by Jerry Siegel and Joe Shuster; Story written by Mario Puzo; Screenplay co-written with Leslie Newman and Mario Puzo
1982	Jinxed!	Screenplay by	Story written by Frank D. Gilroy (credited as "Bert Blessing"); Screenplay co-written with Frank D. Gilroy (credited as "Bert Blessing")
1982	Still of the Night	Story by	Story co-written with Robert Benton; Screenplay written by Robert Benton
1983	Superman III	Screenplay by	Based on character (Superman) created by Jerry Siegel and Joe Shuster; Screenplay co-written with Leslie Newman
1984	Sheena	Story by, screenplay by	Story co-written with Leslie Stevens; Screenplay co-written with Lorenzo Semple Jr.
1985	Santa Claus: The Movie	Story by, screenplay by	Story co-written with Leslie Newman; Screenplay written by David Newman
1987	R.О.Т.О.R.	Associate producer	
1988	Moonwalker	Screenplay by (segment: "Smooth Criminal")	Story for segment "Smooth Criminal" written by Michael Jackson; Screenplay for segment "Smooth Criminal" written by David Newman
2000	Track Down	Screenplay by	Based on book written by Tsutomu Shimomura and John Markoff; Screenplay co-written with Leslie Newman, Howard A. Rodman and John Danza
2006	Superman II: The Richard Donner Cut	Screenplay by	Based on character (Superman) created by Jerry Siegel and Joe Shuster; Story written by Mario Puzo; Screenplay co-written with Leslie Newman and Mario Puzo

=== Theatrical stage ===
Year	Title	Notes
1966	It's a Bird... It's a Plane... It's Superman	Libretto co-written with Robert Benton; Adaptation in television film (1975)
1969	Oh! Calcutta!	Libretto co-written with Robert Benton, Jules Feiffer, Dan Greenburg, John Lennon, Jacques Levy, Sam Shepard, Leonard Melfi, Kenneth Tynan, Margo Sappington, Clovis Trouille and Sherman Yellen; Adaptation in theatrical film (1972)
