= Superman II: The Richard Donner Cut =

2006 superhero film

- DVD cover
- Directed by: Richard Donner
- Screenplay by: Mario Puzo; David Newman; Leslie Newman
- Story by: Mario Puzo
- Based on: Superman by: Jerry Siegel; Joe Shuster
- Produced by: Pierre Spengler
- Starring: Gene Hackman; Christopher Reeve; Marlon Brando; Ned Beatty; Jackie Cooper; Sarah Douglas; Margot Kidder; Jack O'Halloran; Valerie Perrine; Clifton James; E.G. Marshall; Marc McClure; Terence Stamp
- Cinematography: Geoffrey Unsworth
- Edited by: Stuart Baird; Michael Thau
- Music by: John Williams
- Distributed by: Warner Bros. Pictures
- Release date: November 28, 2006
- Running time: 116 minutes
- Countries: United Kingdom; United States
- Language: English
- Budget: $54 million

Superman II: The Richard Donner Cut (titled onscreen as simply Superman II) is a 2006 re-edited director's cut of the 1980 superhero film Superman II, a sequel to Richard Donner's 1978 film Superman: The Movie, based on the DC Comics superhero of the same name. It stars Gene Hackman, Christopher Reeve, and Marlon Brando and was edited by Michael Thau and overseen and completed by Donner himself. It features a significant amount of discarded footage, alternative takes, and story elements not featured in the theatrical version.

In 1979, after the tense nineteen month-long shoot on Superman and a significant portion of Superman II (as much as 80%), Alexander Salkind, who had bought the film rights to the character, removed Donner from production on the sequel and replaced him with director Richard Lester. Lester completed the remainder of the film for its theatrical release, but also re-wrote and re-shot a substantial portion of Donner's footage in order to receive full director's credit. While the sequel was a critical and financial success upon release, interest in Donner's cut of Superman II became well known after a community of online fans began petitioning for Warner Bros. Pictures to release Donner's vision. After Brando's death in 2004, his family estate allowed for Warner Bros. to feature archival footage of the late actor in the 2006 film Superman Returns, thus granting the studio permission to restore Donner's version of Superman II. Superman II: The Richard Donner Cut is dedicated to Reeve's memory, who also died in 2004.

Since Donner never completed Superman II in its original form, certain key scenes filmed by Lester, along with newly created visual effects shots and an early screen test of one pivotal scene featuring Reeve and Margot Kidder, had to be added to the film in order to create a completed work. The film also features an early developed alternate opening and ending that were both envisioned before the theatrical release of Superman, in which the sequel's original ending was re-worked as the finale to the first film. Donner stated that, had he finished the film in 1980, he would have shot a different ending. Superman II: The Richard Donner Cut was released on DVD, Blu-ray, and HD DVD by Warner Bros. Pictures on November 28, 2006, to positive reviews.

== Plot ==
On the planet Krypton, criminals General Zod, Ursa and Non are sentenced to eternal banishment inside the Phantom Zone by Jor-El for insurrection and murder, amongst other crimes. Thirty years later, Superman diverts a missile into outer space, unknowingly freeing them from the Phantom Zone.

At the Daily Planet in Metropolis, Lois Lane suspects that Clark Kent is Superman. She tests Clark by jumping out of a window, but Clark uses his powers to save her while appearing to have done nothing. Meanwhile, with the help of Eve Teschmacher, Lex Luthor escapes from prison, abandoning Otis. They find and infiltrate the Fortress of Solitude, learning of the impending doom brought by General Zod. Lex resolves to meet Zod, and begins tracking him. On the Moon, Zod, Ursa, and Non discover that they have superpowers due to Earth's yellow sun, and ruthlessly kill a group of astronauts.

Perry White has Clark and Lois pose as newlyweds to investigate a honeymoon suite scam at Niagara Falls. Superman's appearance and rescue of a small boy at the Falls renews Lois' suspicions, and she tricks Clark with a gun loaded with blanks into admitting that he is Superman. He takes Lois Lane to the Fortress of Solitude, where the two spend the night together. Meanwhile, Zod, Ursa and Non arrive on Earth and conquer a small town in Idaho. After learning that the U.S. military takes orders from the President of the United States, the Kryptonians fly to Washington, D.C., and invade the White House.

Superman, unaware of Zod's release from the Phantom Zone and his subsequent rampage, decides to transform himself into a human and remove his powers by exposing himself to red Kryptonian sunlight in a crystal chamber. On their way back to Metropolis, Lois and Clark stop at a diner, where Clark gets beaten up by an obnoxious trucker and learns of Zod's conquest of the world.

Knowing that humanity is helpless, Clark returns to the Fortress to reverse the transformation. Having anticipated this decision, Jor-El's artificial intelligence reveals it has been programmed to deal with this situation by sacrificing the remaining Kryptonian energy it needs to operate. To restore Clark's powers, it must be joined with him, fulfilling the Kryptonian prophecy concerning "the father becoming the son", resulting in the "death" of Jor-El and rendering the Fortress of Solitude inoperable.

Lex arrives at the White House. In exchange for Australia, he informs Zod that Superman is the son of Jor-El, and that he has the ability to find him. He takes the three Kryptonians to Metropolis to kidnap Lois as bait for Superman. Superman arrives and a fight ensues in and over Metropolis. After saving a bus full of civilians, Superman realizes he cannot win and flies to his Fortress, with Zod, Ursa, and Non in pursuit, bringing Lois and Lex with them.

At the Fortress, Luthor shows the chamber that stripped Superman of his powers to Zod, who forces Superman to again undergo the transformation process. Superman, feigning defeat, reveals by crushing Zod's hand, that he has altered the process to expose everyone outside the chamber, removing the Kryptonian criminals' powers, while protecting himself. Zod, Ursa and Non are quickly defeated.

After destroying the Fortress of Solitude with his heat vision, Superman returns Lois to her apartment, where she wishes him a tearful goodbye, knowing that she can never be with him. To undo everything, Superman accelerates around Earth, traveling back in time to restore the past few days, rebuild the Fortress of Solitude and place Zod, Ursa and Non back into the Phantom Zone. Clark returns to work the following day as Lois and Perry experience a slight case of déjà vu. Clark revisits the diner with the obnoxious trucker and summarily defeats him.

== History ==
In 1977, director Richard Donner set about simultaneously filming an epic two-part adaptation of the Superman comic book series. Principal photography began on March 28, 1977, at Pinewood Studios for the Krypton scenes, but by May 1977, production had run two weeks behind schedule. It was reported that Donner had developed tensions with the Salkinds and Pierre Spengler concerning the escalating production budget and production schedule. Donner responded by claiming he was never given a budget. However, Donner told Starlog in March 1979, "I got along with the Salkinds all right, but I didn't get on with Pierre Spengler. I told him to his face that the film was too big for him but he wouldn't face up to the responsibility. It had nothing to do with the film itself, it was in the making of the film—the knowledge to pull it off."

In July 1977, Richard Lester, who worked with the Salkinds on The Three Musketeers (1973) and The Four Musketeers (1974), was brought in as a temporary co-producer to mediate the relationship between Donner and the Salkinds who were no longer on speaking terms. Prior to this, Lester had won a lawsuit against the Salkinds for money still owed to him from making the films, but the assets were held in legal entanglements in the Bahamas. The Salkinds then offered to compensate him if he would help on the Superman films, in which Lester became a second unit director where he and Donner formed an effective partnership.

By October 1977, Gene Hackman, Ned Beatty, and Valerie Perrine had completed their scenes as they were all under contract to finish both pictures. Nevertheless, with months left of filming, the Salkinds halted filming for Superman II and focused on finishing Superman by which time Donner had already completed 75% of the sequel.

Following Superman's December 1978 release, it was widely assumed that Donner would be recalled to complete the remainder of the sequel. Spengler had encountered Variety columnist Army Archerd at a Christmas party, and assured him that while there had been tension, he was proud of the film and looked forward to working with him on the sequel. Archerd then contacted Donner in which he responded "If he's on it—I'm not." However, a number of events led to Donner's eventual replacement as director of the movie. Most importantly, producers Alexander and Ilya Salkind announced that Marlon Brando's completed scenes for Superman II would be excised from the movie in order for them to avoid having to pay the actor the reported 11.75% of gross U.S. box-office takings he was now demanding for his performance in the sequel. Donner publicly lambasted this decision, announcing that he would make the film his way or not at all. In January 1979, Donner had told Variety, "That means no games... They have to want me to do it. It has to be on my terms and I don't mean financially. I mean control." As Donner had become unavailable during the European promotional campaign for Superman, the Salkinds approached Guy Hamilton to take over directional reins for Superman II since Lester was filming Cuba (1979) at the time. Hamilton was unavailable, but by the time Superman II was ready to begin filming, Lester had completed Cuba and was available to direct.

Eventually, on March 15, 1979, the Salkinds decided to replace Donner with Richard Lester. Donner recalled that "One day, I got a telegram from them saying my services are no longer needed and that my dear friend Richard Lester would take over. To this day, I have not heard from them." Ilya Salkind countered, "Dick Donner said, 'I will do the second movie on my terms and without [Pierre] Spengler'...Spengler was my friend since childhood and my father and I were very loyal guys. We said no, and it really boiled down to that."

=== The 1980 theatrical Superman II (The Richard Lester Cut) ===
With Lester placed as director, he was not sympathetic to Donner's filmmaking style: "Donner was emphasizing a kind of grandiose myth. There was a kind of David Lean-ish attempt in several sequences, and enormous scale. There was a type of epic quality which isn't in my nature, so my work really didn't embrace that...That's not me. That's his vision of it. I'm more quirky and I play around with slightly more unexpected silliness." Since Geoffrey Unsworth had died before the release of Superman, Lester brought on cinematographer Robert Paynter to have the film evoke the garish color scheme of the comics.

Tom Mankiewicz was approached by Terry Semel, then a Warner Bros. vice president, to return for the sequel, but he declined out of loyalty to Donner. Mankiewicz recounted "I have a lot of respect for [Lester]. Friendship is more important than anything. And Dick [Donner] brought me on the picture and my loyalty was with Dick and I couldn't believe that they fired him." David and Leslie Newman were then brought back to re-tool the script constructing a new opening and an ending. The new opening involved Superman thwarting the nuclear terrorists at the Eiffel Tower. The new ending involved Clark causing Lois to forget his secret identity through a hypnotic kiss.

Additionally, Christopher Reeve had become unavailable as he had accepted an offer to star in the romantic fantasy film Somewhere in Time (1980), five months into the production shutdown, by which time his contract to shoot both Superman films back-to-back had expired. Reeve claimed that twelve hours after his casting was announced, he received a letter from the producers to be available for Superman II on July 16, which was only five days after he was to finish filming Somewhere in Time. In March 1979, the Salkinds filed suit against Reeve alleging he had breached his contract by walking off the sequel. Furthermore, Reeve had had reservations about Lester and the Newmans' script following the departure of Donner. During the renegotiation of his contract, Reeve agreed to the financial terms, but demanded more artistic control.

The remaining sequences left to be shot included the scenes of the super-villains in Midwest America and the battle in Metropolis, which were all shot by Lester. Gene Hackman, out of loyalty to Donner, declined to return for re-shoots, which necessitated the use of a body double and a voice impersonator for several scenes. Filming for Superman II re-commenced in September 1979. As previously announced, Brando's scenes were removed and entirely re-shot with actress Susannah York. Throughout filming, Lester opted to retain his directorial technique for the three-camera setup while shooting scenes, which frustrated the actors as they did not know from where they were being filmed for their close-ups. However, Reeve noted that it made the production move faster. Filming was completed on March 10, 1980.

Composer John Williams was flown to England to score the film in which he was given a screening with Ilya Salkind and Richard Lester. When Salkind left the projection room, Williams and Lester fell into an argument; when Salkind returned, Williams told him that he "could not get along with this man." Ken Thorne was then selected to score the sequel. Before the film's release, Warner Bros. had appealed to the Directors Guild of America to assign the appropriate co-director credit, in which they argued Lester could not be credited unless he shot 40 percent of the film. Although Lester had earlier thought he would not be credited, he approached Donner to see if he wished to be credited as co-director, in which Donner replied, "I don't share credit".

The title was released in Europe and Australia on December 4, 1980, and June 19, 1981, in the United States. This version of Superman II combined Donner footage shot in 1977 with Lester footage shot in 1979. Approximately 30 percent of Lester's Superman II is Richard Donner's footage. In numerous scenes, the theatrical Superman II interweaves footage filmed years apart. Much of this interweaving was necessitated by Lex Luthor actor Gene Hackman's refusal to return to film any further scenes with Lester. Thus, all Hackman footage in the film is Donner's, although in certain scenes, a body double was used for wide shots re-filmed by Lester. In several instances, Lester re-staged Donner-filmed scenes, inserting certain newly filmed shots into pre-existing material. This is most evident during a scene in which the super-villains burst into the Daily Planet. The scene was filmed in its entirety by Donner in 1977. The Perry White office set was then partly re-built under Lester in 1979, the actors placed in exactly the same positions, costumes, etc., and new material filmed and inserted into the final film, despite the actors looking physically different.

=== Donner footage in Superman II ===
The following is a list of all major Donner footage that was retained for Superman II:

- Various shots of the Kryptonian villains on trial (Brando has been matted out)
- Scenes from Superman: The Movie during the opening credits (except for hand-double shots replacing Brando)
- Lex Luthor and Otis doing laundry in prison.
- The three supervillains land on the Moon and kill the astronauts.
- Luthor escapes prison.
- Luthor and Teschmacher in the hot air balloon.
- Luthor and Teschmacher at the Fortress of Solitude (Kryptonian recordings filmed by Lester).
- The three supervillains attack the White House and force the President to "kneel before Zod" (except for shots of the American flag falling, shot by Lester).
- A powerless Clark is beaten up by Rocky, a truck driver in a roadside diner (Donner appears as an extra in this sequence).
- Lex Luthor visits the supervillains in the White House (except for the first two shots of the sequence, shot by Lester without Hackman).
- The villains burst into the Daily Planet and chase after Superman (some close-ups are Lester footage).
- The villains return to the Planet and decide to go to Superman's polar fortress (some close-ups are Lester footage).
- The second part of the finale at the Fortress of Solitude, beginning with Luthor's belated arrival (some close-ups are Lester footage).
- Superman returns Lois home.
- Clark returns to the diner and gets his revenge on Rocky.

=== Criticisms ===
Critics of Lester's Superman II, including Donner, have stated that Lester's penchant for comedy undermined the integrity of the film, especially when compared to Donner's Superman. Examples of this trademark comedy are evident during scenes which feature Superman fighting the super-villains in Metropolis. The villains attack the citizens of Metropolis using super-breath. Several sight gags follow, including the wind blowing off a man's toupee, the ice cream being blown off a cone and into someone's face, a man being blown over in a telephone booth and talking the whole time, a man with an umbrella being spun around as if dancing (parodying Singin' in the Rain) and a man on roller-skates rolling uncontrollably backwards across the pavement.

Conversely, David Denby, reviewing the film for New York, praised the film's light approach and credited Lester for the film, particularly Hackman's performance. Mankiewicz shot back in a mailed letter writing, "Just for the record, Gene Hackman never shot a foot of film with Lester and it was all written by me," but New York never issued a correction.

Discussions about the lost Donner footage raged for years. With the advent of the Internet, numerous letter-writing and other campaigns were instigated to persuade Warner Bros. to allow Richard Donner to create his version of Superman II. In 2004, the fan-restored DVD known as Superman II: Restored International Cut was released through many Superman fan sites. It featured extended scenes pulled from international TV broadcasts over the years. Warner Bros. threatened legal action over the bootleg release.

=== The Richard Donner Cut ===
When filming was suspended on Donner's Superman II in October 1977, the director had completed almost all of the major character-based sequences in the film. All scenes in the Daily Planet and most scenes set in the Fortress of Solitude were completed. All scenes featuring Marlon Brando, Ned Beatty, Jackie Cooper, Valerie Perrine and Gene Hackman were also completed. What remained to be filmed was the villains' arrival on Earth, and their rampage through mid-west America as well as exteriors at Washington, D.C., during which Zod announces his takeover of the Earth from the tip of the Washington Monument. Most of the battle scenes between Superman and the super-villains had yet to be shot, as well as both the interiors and exteriors at Niagara Falls, which had been planned to be shot during the Canadian shooting on Superman: The Movie, but was indefinitely postponed to make up for time and get the production back to England quicker. Several minor scenes including a love-struck Superman deliberately tilting over the Leaning Tower of Pisa (later adapted in Superman III) and a scene in which Superman warns off some English fox-hunters were also not filmed.

The Donner Cut features most of the completed but previously unseen scenes (some scenes have been deleted for narrative or dramatic reasons, while others are in alternate takes different from what had been seen in previous television cuts). In many cases such scenes replace those re-filmed or altered by Lester. These include the original opening of the film set in the offices of the Daily Planet. In this opening, we see Lois trying to figure out the similarities between Clark Kent and Superman, followed by Perry White assigning Clark and Lois on the honeymoon racket in Niagara Falls, and then Lois testing Clark / Superman by jumping off the balcony of one floor of the Daily Planet (a revised version of this scene appears in the Lester theatrical cut).

A scene in a Niagara Falls hotel room, in which Lois tricks Clark into revealing he is Superman by shooting at him with a pistol loaded with blanks, is assembled from footage from Christopher Reeve's screen test, filmed with another actress (Holly Palance) as Lois. Footage from Margot Kidder's screen test for the same film was shot with the now-cast Christopher Reeve. Accordingly, Reeve's build, clothing, haircut, and eyeglasses are notably different from shot to shot.

==== Creating the Richard Donner Cut ====
The prospect of creating a Richard Donner cut did not begin to gain momentum until the 2001 DVD restoration of Superman. At the time, six tons of footage of each Superman film were discovered in vaults in England by Michael Thau, including much "lost" footage filmed by Donner. Soon after, Donner was approached by Warner Bros. to do an extended version of Superman II, but remained reluctant to revisit the movie. In May 2001, he told the website IGN: "At the time, the studio wanted me to go back in and re-cut the film and add anything I wanted to add or do anything I wanted to do. Quite honestly, I was done with it. I was finished."

Nonetheless, fans continued to campaign for the film, including Birmingham, England native Dharmesh Chauhan who launched his website, supermancinema.co.uk, in which he petitioned for a release of the Richard Donner cut. In May 2004, the Planet of the Apes fansite TheForbidden-Zone.com launched an Internet campaign demanding Warner Bros. to allow Donner to release his version of Superman II in conjunction with the film's 25th anniversary. On June 19, 2004, the studio responded with the statement, "Warner Home Video is supportive of an extended version of Superman II on DVD. However, there are complex legal issues that need to be resolved before the film can be re-released. Warner Home Video is presently addressing those issues." That same month, Margot Kidder said in an interview for Starlog: "There's a whole other Superman II in a vault somewhere, with scenes of Chris and me that have never seen the light of day. It's far better than the one that was released."

Other than Donner's reluctance to re-visit the project, these legal issues were the greatest obstacle towards creating a Donner cut. The required footage was still owned by the Salkinds, and issues of using Brando's filmed footage in Superman II remained unresolved. In March 2005, it was speculated that archive footage of Brando would be used in the then-upcoming sequel Superman Returns (2006). Later, in November 2006, Donner Cut producer Michael Thau told American Cinematographer magazine, "Marlon Brando's estate made a deal with Warner Bros. to license some of his footage for Superman Returns. This later led to the studio going back to his estate for our re-cut of Superman II. If that footage couldn't be used, it wasn't worth doing the project."

Work began on the project in late 2005, though without Donner's involvement. Thau explained Donner's reluctance to involve himself was because he was preoccupied with directing 16 Blocks (2006) at the time. In January 2006, Donner told IGN: "They're doing it. I'm not doing it... I don't even want to see it until it comes out in the theater... I'm too far away from it now." A month later, when asked about the new Superman II cut, Donner told the website Dark Horizons that Thau was "recutting my picture and again, he's asked me would I help. I can't because it's so long ago and the little bit of footage that I looked at, I would never shoot like that now in a million years, I mean it was a different way, a different style, different interpretation."

"A lot of scenes that had been already cut, that Richard Lester had interwoven new material in – and there was a lot of them – I unwove that material and recut those scenes, basically from scratch a lot of times. I also had to deal with negatives that had already been cut. And when I wanted to recut it, and Lester had already cut it in a different way, I'd have to unwind that. It was a complicated jigsaw puzzle sometimes, to put it back the way I envisioned Dick [Donner] would want it cut. We only used the Lester footage when there was material when they had not been able to shoot, and to keep some continuity to the story."

— Thau, in an interview with Now Playing magazine

Throughout the years, Donner had frequently proclaimed diametrically opposing views with regard to the possibility of re-assembling his Superman II—often stating that he would like to do it, other times stating that he would not. In June 2006, Thau stated, "Dick [Donner] was beginning to free up from 16 Blocks and I would try to lure him into the cutting room with 'Here Dick here's a piece of candy, come take a look' and then he started warming up to the project." Sometime later, Thau confirmed that Donner had decided on a far closer involvement with the project, also bringing in Tom Mankiewicz to assist. In an interview with the magazine Movie Magic, he stated, "When I'd get a cut on a scene, I'd show it to Dick and he'd say, 'I don't like that line; that reading's not good,' and so on. With Dick it's always, 'Make it move faster."

Overall, The Donner Cut comprises Donner's Superman II scenes edited by Stuart Baird in 1977–78, 1980 Superman II theatrical scenes cut by John Victor Smith, as well as a large amount of new material edited by Michael Thau. The new cut reportedly used less than 20 percent of the footage shot by Lester.

In a June 2006 interview with Amazon.com, George Feltenstein, senior vice president of Warner Home Video's Catalog Marketing division, stated:

We have been getting for years and years and years letters begging us to release the Donner cut of Superman II, and this year we bit the bullet and we've created what is ostensibly a new film, although the footage is all footage that was shot years and years and years ago. But it was sitting in a lab and never assembled. And for those of us who were very saddened and touched by the loss of Christopher Reeve – to see footage you've never seen of him before, and a whole different take on the Superman II story, is really thrilling.

== Music ==
Donner contacted composer John Williams about creating a new score for his version of the film, but Williams was unable to help out, as he had also turned down a similar request by Superman Returns director Bryan Singer because he was scoring Star Wars: Episode III – Revenge of the Sith (2005). Donner reused Williams' music (along with unreleased and unused cues) from the first film, while still retaining a small amount of Ken Thorne's score, subsequently relegating Thorne to the closing credits for "additional music", and the new opening title sequence gives Williams' composing credit.

== Release ==
On Friday, July 21, 2006, extended exclusive footage from the Donner Cut was screened during a panel at the 2006 San Diego Comic-Con. The hour-long panel, titled "Warner Home Video's Superman Through the Ages", included a Q&A with Donner, Mankiewicz, Thau, and actors Marc McClure and Jack O'Halloran.

=== World premiere ===
The world premiere of The Donner Cut was screened on November 2, 2006, at the Directors Guild of America building in Hollywood. It was attended by several members of the cast and crew, including Donner, Ilya Salkind, Mankiewicz, Kidder, Sarah Douglas, O'Halloran, and McClure. After the screening, they participated in a panel discussion. On November 25, 2006, an exclusive screening benefit for Superman II: The Richard Donner Cut was held at the Fine Arts Theatre in Los Angeles, California.

=== Home media ===
On November 28, 2006, the film was released on DVD, Blu-Ray, and HD DVD, which featured an optional introduction by director Richard Donner and an audio commentary by Donner and Mankiewicz. Additionally, the release included a new making-of featurette titled Superman II: Restoring the Vision and six deleted scenes.

== Reception ==
=== Critical response ===
The review aggregator website Rotten Tomatoes gave Superman II: The Richard Donner Cut an approval rating of 90% based on 10 reviews with an average rating of 7.6 out of 10. In comparison, the theatrical cut of Superman II received an approval rating of 88% based on 113 reviews with an average rating of 7.5/10.

Kenneth Sweeney, writing in American Cinematographer magazine, praised the DVD release, noting that "Donner's take on the narrative events of Superman II is unusual and fascinating. This version includes a longer prologue, deletes many of Lester's campy sequences, and offers a more consistent balance between adventure and romance." He concluded that "[t]his exciting, one-of-a-kind DVD is really a joy to behold for longtime fans of the Superman franchise, and is a must for all fans of the superhero genre." Todd Gilchrist of IGN gave The Donner Cut a score of 9 out of 10, writing "the film itself is a remarkable artistic accomplishment". Vic Holtreman, reviewing for Screen Rant, praised The Donner Cut as superior to the theatrical version, but lamented that "there is still almost all of the silly humor that was in the first Superman film and the original release of Superman II."

In his book Superman vs Hollywood, Jake Rossen wrote, "Superman II: The Richard Donner Cut is neither a better nor a worse film than its first incarnation. Lester's labored slapstick has been all but excised, and Brando's presence certainly elevates the melodrama surrounding Clark's conflict over becoming 'human.' But incorporating the unpolished audition footage is jarring; ultimately, the edit is simply a curiosity." Keith Phipps of The A.V. Club graded the film a C+, concluding, "It's nice to see the Brando footage and the restored scenes of Christopher Reeve and Margot Kidder's breezy chemistry. But where the original cut at least played as a relatively cohesive movie, loose ends and all, this looks like little but loose ends. It's a curio, not a corrective."

=== Accolades ===
Superman II: The Richard Donner Cut received an award at the 33rd Saturn Awards in the category of Best DVD Special Edition Release.

Year	Award	Category	Recipient	Result
2007	Saturn Awards	Best DVD Special Edition Release	Superman II: The Richard Donner Cut	Won
2007	Saturn Awards	Best DVD or Blu-ray Collection	Includes Superman: The Movie, Superman II, Superman II:The Richard Donner Cut, Superman III, Superman IV: The Quest for Peace & Superman Returns	Nominated
2006	Satellite Awards	Best Overall DVD	Superman II: The Richard Donner Cut	Won

== See also ==
- Zack Snyder's Justice League

== Bibliography ==
- Mankiewicz, Tom; Crane, Robert (2012). My Life as a Mankiewicz: An Insider's Journey through Hollywood. University Press of Kentucky. ISBN 978-0-8131-6123-5.
- Rossen, Jake (2008). Superman vs. Hollywood: How Fiendish Producers, Devious Directors, and Warring Writers Grounded an American Icon. Chicago Review Press. ISBN 978-1-55652-731-9.
- Scivally, Bruce (2008). Superman On Film: Film, Television, Radio And Broadway. McFarland & Company. ISBN 978-0-7864-3166-3.
- Tye, Larry (2013). Superman: The High-Flying History of America's Most Enduring Hero. Random House Trade Paperbacks. ISBN 978-0-8129-8077-6.
- Weldon, Glen (2013). Superman: The Unauthorized Biography. Wiley. ISBN 978-1-118-34184-1.
