= Lex Luthor (1978 film series character) =

Villain in the film Superman (1978)

- Superman character
- Gene Hackman as Lex Luthor in Superman (1978)
- First appearance: Superman (1978)
- Last appearance: Superman '78 #6 (2022)
- Based on: Lex Luthor by: Jerry Siegel; Joe Shuster
- Adapted by: Mario Puzo; David Newman; Leslie Newman; Robert Benton
- Portrayed by: Gene Hackman; Kevin Spacey

In-universe information
- Full name: Alexander Joseph Luthor
- Family: Unnamed father Lenny Luthor (nephew)
- Significant other: Eve Teschmacher
- Home: Metropolis

Alexander Joseph Luthor is a supervillain portrayed by American actor Gene Hackman in the Warner Bros. Superman film series produced by Ilya and Alexander Salkind, and is an adaption of the original DC Comics character, Lex Luthor. Luthor's girlfriend, film-original character Eve Teschmacher, was later adapted to comic books and other media.

== Development and execution ==
Ilya and Alexander Salkind, along with producing partner Pierre Spengler, purchased the film rights to the Superman property in August 1974. It was agreed that the Salkinds would produce and supervise filming on Superman and Superman II simultaneously, as had been the case with The Three Musketeers and The Four Musketeers.

As casting started to take place, and Alexander Salkind wanted a famous actor in the role of Superman. Dustin Hoffman was once again highly considered though the idea was dropped. Robert Redford was offered the part, but he felt he was too famous and was not right for the role, as did Burt Reynolds. After the success of Rocky, Sylvester Stallone lobbied hard for the role but was ignored. Paul Newman was offered all three roles of Superman, Jor-El and Lex Luthor to his choosing though he did not accept any of them, for a salary of $4 million. Nick Nolte and Rex Harrison would both turn it down. It was decided to focus on casting Jor-El and Lex Luthor and save Superman for later. Hoffman was then offered the role of Luthor, and although he was interested, he turned it down. Marlon Brando would eventually be cast as Jor-El, causing Gene Hackman to be cast as Luthor as he wanted desperately to work with Brando. Impressed by the producers' ability to cast famous actors in respective roles, Warner Bros. decided to distribute the film internationally, rather than simply domestically. The filmmakers made it a priority to shoot all of Brando's and Hackman's footage "because they would be committed to other films immediately."

During My Life, Stark Hesseltine told Christopher Reeve that he had been asked to audition for the leading role as Clark Kent/Superman in the big budget film Superman. Lynn Stalmaster, the casting director, put Reeve's picture and résumé on the top of the pile three separate times, only to have the producers throw it out each time. Through Stalmaster's persistent pleading, a meeting between director Richard Donner, producer Ilya Salkind, and Reeve was arranged. The morning after the meeting, Reeve was sent a 300-page script. He was thrilled that the script took the subject matter seriously, and that Richard Donner's motto was verisimilitude. Reeve flew to London for a screen test, and on the way was told that Marlon Brando was going to play Jor-El and Gene Hackman was going to play Lex Luthor.

When Hackman was initially cast, he was sporting a full head of hair and mustache unlike the Lex Luthor of the comics. Hackman was however, reluctant to shave his head or his mustache. So director Richard Donner made a deal with Hackman that if he shaved off his mustache, he would shave off his own. Hackman relented and when he returned to the set, Donner had revealed that he was sporting a fake mustache the whole time, which caused Hackman to laugh. Hackman did, however, get to keep his hair. In the film, Hackman's hairstyle was changed in every scene to create the illusion he was wearing wigs.

Donner filmed most of Superman II with the expectation he would complete the sequel after the release of Superman. Despite the first film's success, Donner was fired from Superman II. Throughout the filming of Superman and Superman II, Donner had a difficult relationship with executive producers Alexander Salkind and Ilya Salkind and producer Pierre Spengler. The Salkinds refused Donner's demand that Spengler be fired; instead, the Salkinds replaced Donner as director of Superman II with Richard Lester, who had worked with the Salkinds on The Three Musketeers and The Four Musketeers and as an uncredited producer on Superman. Following Donner's dismissal, Marlon Brando's scenes were removed from Superman II and much of the film was re-shot under Lester's direction.

Meanwhile, Gene Hackman, who had finished the majority of his scenes playing Lex Luthor, left the project following the departure of Richard Donner. After replacement director Richard Lester took over production, a Fake Shemp was used to finish Hackman's remaining scenes. This was accomplished by an uncredited actor standing in for Hackman, though not ever facing the camera, while also impersonating Hackman's voice.

Yuzuru Fujimoto dubbed for Gene Hackman in Japanese in Superman IV: The Quest for Peace. Meanwhile, Sergio Fiorentini dubbed for Hackman in Italian for his role in the Superman franchise.

== Portrayal and characteristics ==
Gene Hackman's portrayal is a notable departure from the comic book incarnations. In the films, Luthor is portrayed as Superman's comedic foil, or as comic book critic Peter Sanderson puts it, "a used car salesman wielding nuclear missiles". In most of the films of this franchise, Luthor's main business interest is real estate speculation.

In the 2006 film Superman Returns, Lex Luthor is played by Kevin Spacey. Although retaining a humorous streak, Spacey's take on the character is drier and more straightforward than Hackman's, and displays more personal dislike and hatred for Superman. Because of his Oscar-winning performance in director Bryan Singer's film The Usual Suspects (1995), and friendship with the director, Spacey was the only actor considered for Luthor. The writers specifically had Spacey in mind for the part when writing the script. Spacey's Luthor has the same comically exaggerated vanity and pompous arrogance of Hackman's, and the same strong interest in real estate, but Spacey's Luthor is less campy and more serious. Spacey later said that Singer told him to play the character as "darker and more bitter" than Hackman did and not to use Hackman's portrayal as an inspiration.

== Role in the franchise ==
For the role of B.Z. in Santa Claus: The Movie, producers Alexander and Ilya Salkind wanted a star with a similar stature to Gene Hackman when he had played Lex Luthor in Superman: The Movie. To this end, they offered the role to Harrison Ford who turned them down. They made offers to Dustin Hoffman, Burt Reynolds and Johnny Carson --- all of whom, for one reason or another, turned the part down. Eventually, John Lithgow was settled on after Salkind watched Terms of Endearment and realized that he had a Grinch-type look to him.

In the Ned's Newt episode "The Lucky Penny", Ned's father opened a new bank account for Ned, after finding all the change around Ned's room. To Ned's horror, however, that means he has deposited his "lucky penny", a treasured penny that has an image of Gene Hackman as Lex Luthor on it. When the bank refuses to get it for him, Newton helps Ned by breaking into the bank vault to find it. They do, but Newton had to give away $3.5 million in the bank vault to make it easier to find. They're saved, however, when a passing coin collector points out that Ned's penny is only one of two in the entire world, worth $3.5 million. Ned and Newton quickly put all the money back in the vault, and the bank owner gives Ned the only other Gene Hackman penny in existence.

The depiction of Lex Luthor in Superman: Brainiac Attacks, rather than being the cold, calculating industrialist portrayed in Superman: The Animated Series, seems to incorporate elements of Gene Hackman's less serious portrayals of the character in live-action movies, making Luthor more light-hearted and darkly whimsical, going as far as to make jokes about the situations around him.

Wonder Woman 1984 director Patty Jenkins has stated Pedro Pascal's performance as Maxwell Lord was inspired by Gordon Gekko from Oliver Stone's Wall Street and by Gene Hackman's portrayal of Lex Luthor in Richard Donner's 1978 Superman film, with Jenkins describing Lord as "a villain with potential to be dangerous and scary".

Allison Mack enjoyed the fact that her character, Chloe Sullivan was created specifically for the show Smallville, because she felt like she did not have to worry about being compared to someone else in the same role, which she likened to people comparing Michael Rosenbaum's performance as Lex Luthor to Gene Hackman's portrayal in the Superman film series of the 1970-80s.

Jon Cryer, who previously portrayed Lex's nephew Lenny in Superman IV: The Quest for Peace, would eventually play Lex Luthor himself on Supergirl.

== Timelines ==
=== Original continuity ===
==== Superman (1978) ====
Lex Luthor first appeared in the 1978 movie Superman: The Movie. Luthor is a charismatic yet cutthroat businessman purely motivated by money, as well as the desire to swindle as tremendous a fortune as possible to prove his genius, and no concern for the consequences his schemes could produce or how they could affect others. Although he is bald, he wears a variety of wigs throughout the film to conceal it. Luthor's schemes are offset by a tendency to surround himself with unsatisfactory help; he is burdened by his bumbling henchman Otis (Ned Beatty), as well as his conscience-stricken girlfriend Eve Teschmacher (Valerie Perrine). Luthor plots to divert a nuclear missile into hitting the San Andreas Fault, causing California to sink into the ocean, thereby turning its neighboring states into prime beachfront property.

He deduces that a meteorite found in Addis Ababa is actually a radioactive piece of the exploded planet Krypton. Although Luthor nearly kills Superman using kryptonite, Superman escapes with the help of Teschmacher. Hackensack, New Jersey was to have been ground zero for a nuclear missile tampered with by Otis, who mistakenly programmed coordinates that would divert the missile to Hackensack instead of San Andreas. Teschmacher was prompted to save Superman's life, after making him promise to save her mother, a Hackensack resident. After Superman repairs the damage to the San Andreas region, he delivers Luthor and Otis to prison. Luthor reveals his identity to the guards while removing his wig.

==== Superman II (1980) ====
Lex Luthor's role in Superman II is relegated to a supporting one. Luthor escapes prison thanks to a jailbreak organized with the help of Miss Teschmacher while leaving Otis behind. After journeying to the Fortress of Solitude, Luthor learns of the existence of General Zod and the other Kryptonian criminals Ursa and Non. Hoping to rule his own continent once the evil Kryptonians take over Earth, Luthor allies himself with Zod. He asks Zod for control over real estate in Australia. However, when Superman confronts Zod and his cronies at the Fortress of Solitude at the film's climax, Superman tricks Luthor into revealing that there is a chamber in the Fortress which can nullify a Kryptonian's powers using synthetic red solar radiation- in essence turning a Kryptonian, such as Superman, Zod, and his followers Non and Ursa, into a vulnerable human. Fortunately, expecting Luthor's betrayal, Superman had already reversed the mechanism of the chamber, and when forced inside by Zod, the "red sun" beams are dispersed throughout the Fortress while Superman is safely shielded; Zod and his followers are defeated easily because of the loss of their powers. Luthor is seemingly left stranded at the Fortress when Superman and Lois are seen leaving. The final parts of Superman II: The Richard Donner Cut had Superman turning back time to prevent Luthor from escaping from prison while also making sure that General Zod, Ursa, and Non remain in the Phantom Zone.

Joyce Kilmer's poem "Trees" was recited in a video of an elder (John Hollis) from planet Krypton as an example of "poetry from Earth literature". (Note: The original footage filmed by director Richard Donner before he was fired from the production featured Marlon Brando (playing as Superman's father Jor-El). Brando's scenes were not included in the 1980 theatrical release due to ongoing financial and contractual disputes between Brando and the producers. Lester reshot Brando's scenes with Hollis. Brando's scenes were restored for the re-edited director's cut Superman II: The Richard Donner Cut released in 2006 that featured Donner's original vision for the film. Jeremy Wheeler wrote a comparison of the two versions of the film.) Luthor ridicules the poem.

As with the first film, Alexander and Ilya Salkind prepared a version for worldwide television release that re-inserted unused footage (in this case 24 minutes) into the film. It was through this extended version that viewers first caught a glimpse into the Superman II that might have happened had Richard Donner remained as director. In fact, a majority of the added footage was shot by Donner before Richard Lester became director. 17 of the 24 added minutes were utilized by ABC for its 1984 network premiere. Subsequent ABC airings of the longer version would be cut further for more advertising time. The full 146-minute extended cut was shown internationally, including parts of Canada.

The added footage offers an alternative ending to the film. In the theatrical cut, it is implied that Superman has killed the three Kryptonian villains (going against the strict code that Superman does not kill). In the extended ending, a U.S. "polar patrol" is shown picking up the three Kryptonians and Lex Luthor, after which Superman, with Lois standing beside him, destroys the Fortress of Solitude.

==== Superman III (1983) ====
Both Gene Hackman and Margot Kidder (Lois Lane) are said to have been angry with the way the Salkinds treated Superman director Richard Donner, with Hackman retaliating by refusing to reprise the role of Lex Luthor. After Margot Kidder publicly criticized the Salkinds for their treatment of Donner, the producers reportedly "punished" the actress by reducing her role in Superman III to a brief appearance. Hackman later denied such claims, stating that he had been busy with other movies and general consensus that making Luthor a constant villain would be akin to incessant horror movie sequels where a serial killer keeps coming back from the grave. Hackman would reprise his role as Lex Luthor in Superman IV, with which the Salkinds had no involvement. In his commentary for the 2006 DVD release of Superman III, Ilya Salkind denied any ill will between Margot Kidder and his production team and denied the claim that her part was cut for retaliation. Instead, he said, the creative team decided to pursue a different direction for a love interest for Superman, believing the Lois and Clark relationship had been played out in the first two films (but could be revisited in the future). With the choice to give a more prominent role to Lana Lang, Lois' part was reduced for story reasons. Salkind also denied the reports about Gene Hackman being upset with him, stating that Hackman was unable to return because of other film commitments.

Christopher Reeve was third billed behind Marlon Brando and Gene Hackman respectively for the first Superman film and billed second behind Hackman for Superman II. With Brando and Hackman absent from Superman III, Reeve was finally given first billing. When Gene Hackman returned to the franchise in Superman IV: The Quest for Peace, he was this time, billed second behind Reeve.

==== Superman IV: The Quest for Peace (1987) ====
Lex Luthor reappears in Superman IV: The Quest for Peace, escaping from prison once more, this time with the aid of his nephew Lenny (portrayed by Jon Cryer) who uses his car to distract the guards when Luthor was working in the prison's rock pile. In the film, Luthor never takes off his wig. Once again, Lex allies himself with other villains, in this instance a cadre of war profiteers and arms dealers who are worried about what Superman's efforts toward nuclear disarmament will do to their business. Lex uses his own DNA combined with a strand of Superman's hair that is stolen from a museum to create a hybrid clone that he dubs Nuclear Man (portrayed by Mark Pillow and voiced by Gene Hackman). The radioactive villain possesses abilities similar to Superman, but receives his power from direct sunlight, whereas Superman can still operate in darkness. Superman exploits this weakness eventually, destroying Nuclear Man.

The Luthors are seen driving away from Metropolis incognito as Lex plans for them to lay low for a couple of years so that he can come up with a new plan. Their car is picked up by Superman much to their dismay. Superman drops Lenny off at Boys Town stating that Lenny was under a bad influence. Then he returns Lex to the prison rock pile and gives him to the guards. When Lex asked how Superman defeated his creation, Superman stated that he found out about Nuclear Man's weakness of being made from sunlight and used it to his advantage. Superman flies off stating to Lex that he will see him in 20 years.

=== Superman Returns ===
Lex Luthor
- Superman Returns character
- First appearance: Superman Returns (2006)
- Last appearance: Superman Returns (2006)
- Based on: Lex Luthor by Jerry Siegel Joe Shuster; Lex Luthor by Mario Puzo David Newman Leslie Newman Robert Benton
- Adapted by: Bryan Singer; Michael Dougherty; Dan Harris
- Portrayed by: Kevin Spacey

In-universe information
- Full name: Alexander Joseph Luthor
- Family: Unnamed father
- Significant others: Gertrude Vanderworth (wife; deceased)
- Home: Metropolis

==== Superman Returns (2006) ====
In Superman Returns, ignoring the events of Superman III and IV and (loosely) taking place years after Superman II, Luthor (now portrayed by Kevin Spacey) has been paroled from prison bent on revenge against Superman (now portrayed by Brandon Routh). Luthor funds his criminal operations by seducing a wealthy, elderly benefactor named Gertrude Vanderworth (portrayed by Noel Neill). Luthor's machinations once again concern real estate, as they did in the first two films. This time, he is assisted by his sidekick wealthy heiress Kitty Kowalski (portrayed by Parker Posey). He spends most of the film bald, only wearing a wig in his opening scene.

Luthor plans to use Kryptonian crystals, like the one Superman used to create the Fortress of Solitude, to form a new continent, owned by Luthor, submerging the United States in the process and killing untold numbers of people. The landmass also has the added effect of sapping Superman's powers when he is in proximity, as Luthor has laced it with Kryptonite. While Superman is weakened, Luthor has his henchmen assault and torture him, before stabbing him with a shard of Kryptonite. Superman falls off the edge of the landmass into the Atlantic Ocean, presumably to his death. However, with the help of Lois Lane and Richard White, Superman recovers and hurls the landmass into space. After his scheme fails, Luthor uses a helicopter to escape capture, but it runs out of fuel stranding him on a deserted island with Kitty Kowalski as well as her dog. When she asks what they will eat, he looks at the dog hungrily.

=== Superman '78 ===
Sometime after the events of Superman II (ignoring the other Superman films), after Metropolis is suddenly attacked by a robot from outer space, which begins wreaking havoc on the streets while scanning the people and environment. Clark suits up as Superman and destroys the robot, taking its head and giving it to Luthor (who was recently released on parole) to analyze.

Later, Lex brings Lois into his secret hideout and reveals he planted a receiver on Superman before Brainiac took him. He allows Lois to use his space transmitter to communicate with Superman, which Brainiac is quickly alerted to. Lex reveals his plan was for Brainiac to intercept the transmission so he could challenge the alien's intellect. However, it instead encourages Brainiac to excise Metropolis and shrink it to preserve it like he's done for the other civilizations, leading Lex to flee in a hot air balloon.

== Reception ==
Gene Hackman showed a talent for both comedy and the "slow burn" as criminal mastermind Lex Luthor in Superman: The Movie (1978). On that end, he was nominated for a BAFTA Award for Best Actor in a Supporting Role, only to lose to John Hurt in Midnight Express.

James Berardinelli reacted positively to Superman Returns, comparing it favorably with Richard Donner's 1978 film. He felt Kevin Spacey was better than Gene Hackman as Lex Luthor, describing him as "more cruel and less flippant" than Hackman. "There are no miscasts to be found in the supporting cast, either," Berardinelli said. "Superman Returns is near the top, if not at the top of the superhero movie pile. It offers nearly everything: romance, action, humor, and plenty of goose bumps."

== See also ==
- Lex Luthor in other media
  - Lex Luthor (DC Extended Universe)
  - Lex Luthor (Smallville)
  - Lex Luthor (Arrowverse)
