= Christ figure =

Stock character that draws allusions to biblical Jesus

A Christ figure, also known as a Christ-Image, is a literary technique that the author uses to draw allusions between their characters and the biblical Jesus. More loosely, the Christ figure is a spiritual or prophetic character who parallels Jesus, or other spiritual or prophetic figures.

In general, a character should display more than one correspondence with the story of Jesus Christ as depicted in the Bible. For instance, the character might display one or more of the following traits: performance of miracles, manifestation of divine qualities, healing others, displaying kindness and forgiveness, fighting for justice, being guided by the spirit of the father character, and the character's own death and resurrection. Christ figures are often martyrs, sacrificing themselves for larger causes.

In postmodern literature, the resurrection theme is often abandoned, leaving us with the image of a martyr sacrificing himself for a greater good. It is common to see Christ figures displayed in a manner suggestive of crucifixion as well.

== Literature ==
- Jim Conklin in The Red Badge of Courage. R. W. Stallman has first put forward the hypothesis; however, it has led to a long-lasting and controversial debate among Crane scholars.
- Sydney Carton in A Tale of Two Cities
- Alyosha Karamazov in The Brothers Karamazov
- Uncle Tom and Eva St. Clare in Uncle Tom's Cabin
- Jim Casy in The Grapes of Wrath can be seen as taking on the role of both Jesus and Moses starting in the beginning of the novel where, after taking a break from being a preacher, returns to offer a new and important view of the lives the Okies live. He then embarks on a journey with twelve members of the Joad family, who are analogous to Jesus' apostles. Casy aims to create a workers union and tries to convince Tom to get others to join, but Tom denies him three times like Peter denied Jesus.
- Santiago of The Old Man and the Sea by Ernest Hemingway.
- Aslan in The Chronicles of Narnia by C. S. Lewis sacrifices himself to save Edmund but rises again from the dead to defeat the White Witch.
- Simon in William Golding's Lord of the Flies. When Simon reaches up and grabs fruit from the top of a tree for the little boys in the group, it parallels the story of Jesus feeding the people on the mountain with fish and bread. Simon likes to go off on his own (as Jesus did, going into the desert); he "wrestles with the devil" in the form of his conversation with the Lord of the Flies; he goes to the mountaintop to find out the revelation that the "beast" is only a dead pilot, and he is martyred for trying to bring the truth to the other boys. As Simon's corpse is taken by the sea, glowing creatures seem to form a halo around his head.
- Paul Atreides of Dune is seen as a messianic figure by many characters in the novel and its sequels as he fulfills many of their prophecies and gains precognizant abilities, though they are evidently a part of selective breeding. After reluctantly taking advantage of the prophecy to rise to power, Paul, in a subversion of the "chosen one" character trope, rejects his throne and the prophecy, ashamed of the effects of the cult around him. After abdicating, he spends his final days trying to destroy the religion built upon him until he is assassinated for doing so.
- Finny in A Separate Peace
- Billy Budd in Billy Budd by Herman Melville
- Queequeg in Moby Dick by Herman Melville
- John Coffey in The Green Mile.
- Harry Potter in J. K. Rowling's Harry Potter series displays savior qualities during his battles with Lord Voldemort. On multiple occasions, Harry willingly presents himself as a sacrifice and, by doing so, is able to destroy the evil wizard. As an infant, Harry becomes the only being to withstand the Killing Curse and temporarily defeats Voldemort. Later, after defeating Voldemort for the second time, Harry ultimately dies, as Christ did on the cross. In the end, however, as Christ is resurrected, so is Harry Potter, who returns to ultimately destroy Voldemort.
- Meursault in The Stranger.
- Randle Patrick McMurphy in One Flew Over the Cuckoo's Nest.
- Aragorn, a character in The Lord of the Rings series, represents the "kingship" nature of Christ. Like Christ, Aragorn is the descendant of a long line of royalty who has been "exiled," or removed from his crown position. At the end of the series, Aragorn returns to Gondor and is named its official king. Along with Gandalf (sage/prophet) and Frodo Baggins (saviour/priest), Aragorn completes the triune representation of Christ in the series as its king.
- Gandalf the wizard in the novel The Lord of the Rings and Peter Jackson's The Lord of the Rings series. In saving his companions from the Balrog, he falls into an abyss with it, battles with it, dies, and is restored to life by divine intervention. After his return, his robe turns white. The film emphasizes and brings out the symbolic aspects that J. R. R. Tolkien felt compelled to cut back in the book, and adds to the aspects of the sage/prophet and the resurrection aspect also the aspect of the exorcist by making explicit the nature of his healing of Théoden.
- Frodo Baggins, a hobbit, also in The Lord of the Rings. His Christ imagery was more emphasized in the film series. Frodo carried the One Ring, a burden of evil, on behalf of the whole world, like Christ who carried his cross for the sins of mankind. Frodo walks his "Via Dolorosa" to Mount Doom just like Jesus who made his way to Golgotha. As Frodo approaches the Cracks of Doom, the Ring becomes a crushing weight as the cross was for Jesus. Samwise Gamgee, Frodo's friend, parallels Simon of Cyrene, who carries Frodo up to Mount Doom, much as Simon aids Jesus by picking up his cross to Golgotha. When Frodo accomplishes his mission, like Christ, he says "it is done". As Christ ascends to heaven, Frodo's life in Middle-earth comes to an end when he departs to the Undying Lands. Nevertheless, Tolkien makes sure not to present anything like a one-on-one parallel to Christ: Frodo is unmistakably presented as suffering from the effects of the Fall (in the sense of Catholic theology, in which it is not incompatible with being a genuinely friendly, not unheroic person of certain good-will), which does lead to a major false choice that has to be outdone by Providence; and he travels to the Undying Lands – an earthly Paradise, not Heaven – in order to find bodily healing and a possibly long, but finite life in peace.

== Stage, television and film ==
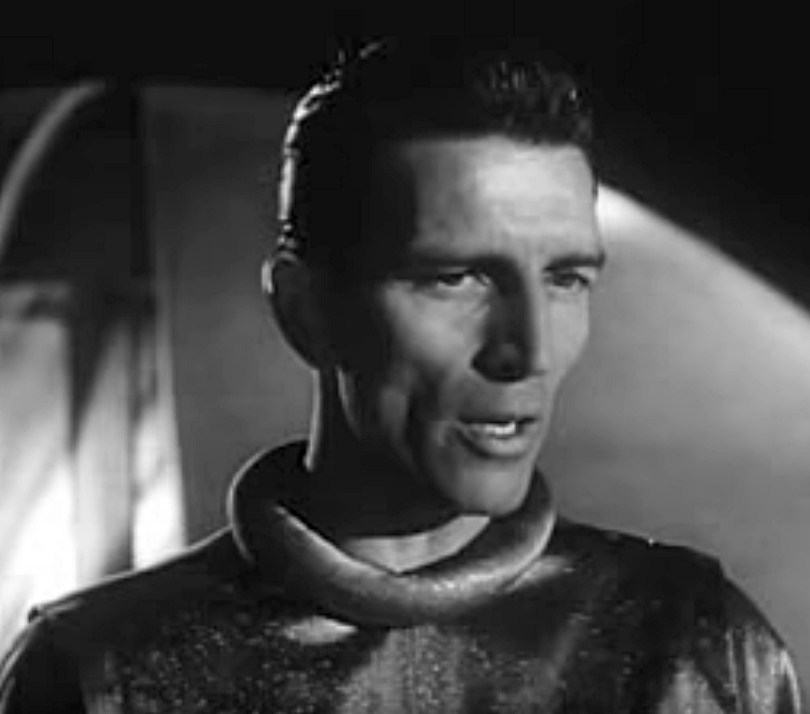
Michael Rennie as Klaatu in The Day the Earth Stood Still (1951)

- Babette in Babette's Feast. She gives entirely of her lottery winnings for the sake of a poor puritanical community.
- James Cole in Twelve Monkeys.
- In Hair, the character Claude becomes a classic Christ figure at various points in the script. In Act I, Claude enters, saying, "I am the Son of God. I shall vanish and be forgotten," then gives benediction to the tribe and the audience. Claude suffers from indecision, and, in his Gethsemane at the end of Act I, he asks "Where Do I Go?". There are various textual allusions to Claude being on a cross, and, in the end, he is chosen to give his life for the others.
- Klaatu in The Day the Earth Stood Still comes down from the "heavens" in a flying saucer, takes the name "Carpenter" to walk incognito among the people, and is persecuted and killed. However, he resurrects back to life, gives a stern benediction to the people of Earth, and then ascends back to the heavens.
- Neo in The Matrix Trilogy. Although the film series makes many visual and textual references to various religions, many Christ figure parallels exist. He is repeatedly called "the One" in a messianic sense; Neo saves various people (and all humanity at the trilogy's conclusion); he suffers and dies; he rises from the dead; and, in the ending of the first film, ascends into the sky. "Neo" is also an anagram of "one".
- Superman in film. Both Superman and Jesus have been sent to Earth by their fathers (Jor-El and God, respectively). Recent film franchises, namely the 1978–2006 series and the DC Extended Universe, chronicle the beginning of Superman's story, with the first film including the famous quote: "They can be a great people, Kal-El, they wish to be. They only lack the light to show the way. For this reason, above all, their capacity for good, I have sent them you: my only son."
  - In Superman: The Movie, Superman is sent to retire for 12 years to be educated "in spirit" by his father to be earth's savior. At the film's ending, he travels back in time to rescue Lois Lane, allowing her to "rise from death".
  - In Superman Returns, Superman tells Lois "You wrote that the world doesn't need a savior," (referring to her article, "Why the World Doesn't Need Superman") "but every day, I hear people crying for one." Later in the film, Superman is stabbed in the side as Jesus was believed to have been during the Crucifixion; after casting the Crystal Continent into space, the fatigued Superman falls to Earth in a pose almost identical to that of a man being crucified. Superman wakes from a coma in what seems the third day (by biblical timekeeping), mirroring Jesus' awakening on the third day after crucifixion.
  - The DCEU films Man of Steel and Batman v Superman: Dawn of Justice also display overt allusions between its iteration of Superman and Christ, including the cross pose, Clark saving several classmates from drowning at age 12, and Jor-El saying that Superman would become a "god" to Earth's inhabitants. Superman becomes a divisive figure in Batman v Superman as Jesus did prior to his crucifixion, and even dies saving the world from Doomsday in the film's climax before being brought back to life in Justice League.
- The T-800 in Terminator 2: Judgment Day is sent to save humanity, and tries to do so by sacrificing itself.
- Spock in Star Trek II: The Wrath of Khan exposes himself to a lethal amount of radiation in order to save the crew of the Enterprise, and is later "resurrected".
- Ellen Ripley in the Alien film series has been seen as a Christ figure. Both in the way that she serves as a personal savior to Newt in Aliens and in the matter that sacrifices her own life in Alien 3 (spreading her arms as she falls into a giant furnace) to destroy the Xenomorph incubating in her body. Others have noted that she dies in an act of self-sacrifice, yet similarly to Jesus, she returns in "another form" in Alien Resurrection.
- Jeremy Reed in Powder.
- Lucas Jackson in Cool Hand Luke.
- E.T. the Extra-Terrestrial.
- The Doctor in Doctor Who, "dying" in martyrdom and regenerating in a crucifix-esque position from time to time to save many worlds.
- Alex J. Murphy in the RoboCop films and other media. A policeman dead as a martyr in the line of duty resurrected to be a righteous champion and protector following faithfully his 3 "commandments": "Serve the public trust, protect the innocent, uphold the law".
- King Leonidas I in the historical-fantasy film 300 (2006), adapted from the graphic novel 300 by Frank Miller. At the film's ending, Leonidas, along with the rest of his 300 Spartans, stay behind to defend a narrow pass against their vastly more numerable Persian foe. Despite suffering a gruesome death to arrow fire, Leonidas' death gives the rest of Sparta time to mobilize an army to defeat the Persian Empire. The final shots of the film show Leonidas' body laying in a crucifix-like pose, pierced in the side and hands by arrows.
- Walt Kowalski in Gran Torino. At the climax of the film, Kowalski lets himself get killed so that the Hmong-gang gets captured by the police. His dying posture even imitates the crucified Christ.
- Buffy Summers in Buffy the Vampire Slayer sacrifices herself to save the world and is resurrected twice. Notably, the first death is prophesized and the second death involves her diving with her arms spread out like a cross. Other examples include, Buffy befriending outcasts, leading a group of devoted followers, and going on a quest through the desert.

== Comics and animation ==
- In comic books as in all other media, Superman saves the people from dangers they cannot overcome on their own. The House of El (Jor-El, Kal-El, etc.) echoes the Hebrew expression for God, El. Jor-El sent his son, Kal-El to Earth to not just to save him from Krypton's impending doom but to become a God on Earth, to protect and save humanity from others and themselves. Jor-El also refers to Kal as "my son" or "the son"; he even once said, "They only need the light to show them the way. For this reason, and this reason only, I have sent you, my only son." Superman is often put situations where he believes that he has to better humanity because he feels that he is the only one that can save humanity. Superman and society around him, sees him as someone to clean up the mess that humanity has made. They see him as a God because he is not one of them, they think that he is better than them. During the storyline The Death of Superman, Superman was nearly killed by Doomsday, but was healed and returned to keep watching over Earth. For all intents and purposes, Superman is looked at as the modern-day, comic book Jesus Christ sent to save Earth before we destroy ourselves in chaos.
- Nausicaä, the protagonist of Hayao Miyazaki's manga Nausicaä of the Valley of the Wind and its film adaptation, is the humane and peace-loving Warrior Princess of the Valley of the Wind, a small post-apocalyptic society in a world dominated by large, powerful insects who reside in the "Sea of Corruption". Fueled by her love for others and for life itself, Nausicaä attempts to restore the balance of life among other human tribes and the insects, often making numerous sacrifices to do so. Although her character was intended to be viewed in the context of animistic philosophies by Miyazaki, she is often interpreted, especially in regards to Disney's English dub, as a Christ figure.
- Kamui Shiro in the manga series X. The story takes place at the end of days. Kamui returns home to Tokyo after a six-year absence to face his destiny as the one who will determine humanity's fate. The construction of Kamui as a messiah is reinforced by his miraculous birth and given name. "Kamui" (a spiritual or divine being in Ainu mythology), like "Christ", doubles as a title that alludes to the character's divine nature.
- Kikyo, in Inuyasha, is able to perform miracles. Resurrected, she eventually gives up on her love for the main character and dies for the cause which allows the other characters to eliminate the antagonist.
