= Superman IV: The Quest for Peace =

1987 film

- Theatrical release poster
- Directed by: Sidney J. Furie
- Screenplay by: Lawrence Konner; Mark Rosenthal
- Story by: Christopher Reeve; Lawrence Konner; Mark Rosenthal
- Based on: Superman by: Jerry Siegel; Joe Shuster
- Produced by: Menahem Golan; Yoram Globus
- Starring: Christopher Reeve; Gene Hackman; Jackie Cooper; Marc McClure; Jon Cryer; Sam Wanamaker; Mark Pillow; Mariel Hemingway; Margot Kidder
- Cinematography: Ernest Day
- Edited by: John Shirley
- Music by: John Williams (Note: Music adapted and conducted by Alexander Courage.)
- Production companies: The Cannon Group, Inc.; Golan-Globus Productions
- Distributed by: Warner Bros.
- Release dates: July 23, 1987 (Premiere); July 24, 1987 (United States/United Kingdom)
- Running time: 90 minutes
- Countries: United States; United Kingdom
- Language: English
- Budget: $17 million
- Box office: $36.7 million

Superman IV: The Quest for Peace is a 1987 superhero film based on the DC Comics character Superman, portrayed by Christopher Reeve in his final appearance as the character. It is the sequel to Superman III (1983), and the fourth mainline installment as well as the fifth installment overall in the Superman film series. It was directed by Sidney J. Furie, written by Lawrence Konner and Mark Rosenthal, and stars Reeve, Gene Hackman, Jackie Cooper, Marc McClure, Jon Cryer, Sam Wanamaker, Mark Pillow, Mariel Hemingway and Margot Kidder.

Reeve agreed to return in exchange for a larger salary and limited creative control, including contributing to a script dealing with nuclear disarmament. It is the first film in the series not to have the involvement of Alexander Salkind and Ilya Salkind as producers. Shortly before the film's production, the film's producer, The Cannon Group, suffered a major financial crisis that forced major budget cuts, and 45 minutes of footage were deleted after negative test screenings.

Superman IV: The Quest for Peace was released on July 24, 1987. It received negative reviews from critics, citing poor special effects and boring action sequences. It underperformed at the box office, grossing $37 million on a $17 million budget. Plans for Superman V were cancelled, and no further Superman films were released until Superman Returns in 2006.

== Plot ==
Superman saves the crew of a Russian space station before uncovering the capsule that brought him to Earth and retrieving a green Kryptonian energy module. A recording left by his mother Lara reveals the module's power can only be used once. Returning to Metropolis, he discovers that the Daily Planet has been taken over by tabloid tycoon David Warfield, who replaces Perry White with his daughter Lacy Warfield, who develops a crush on Clark Kent.

Meanwhile, Superman seeks guidance in the Fortress of Solitude after learning of escalating tensions between the United States and the Soviet Union over nuclear weapons. He later addresses the United Nations and announces his plan to rid the world of all nuclear arms.

Meanwhile, Lenny Luthor orchestrates a jailbreak to free his uncle, Lex Luthor, from prison. The pair travels to Metropolis, where Lex steals a strand of Superman's hair to create a genetic matrix. Partnering with black market arms dealers, Lex attaches the matrix to a nuclear missile. When Superman intercepts the missile and hurls it into the Sun, the resulting energy discharge creates Nuclear Man, a superhuman entity. Nuclear Man returns to Earth, aligning with Lex, who reveals that Nuclear Man becomes inactive without sunlight.

Superman confronts Luthor after learning what he had done, spurring Luthor to direct Nuclear Man to attack. The two battle across the world until they reach New York City. Superman stops Nuclear Man from throwing the Statue of Liberty into Metropolis, but this distracts him enough for Nuclear Man to slash him across the back with his toxic claws.

Superman develops radiation sickness due to a shock from Nuclear Man and is defeated by being cast away. Nuclear Man returns to Luthor, and they conspire to future victories. Superman is badly hurt by the radiation poisoning, but he retrieves the Kryptonian energy module and uses it to heal himself.

Superman confronts Nuclear Man in a second battle that results in them fighting on the Moon and Superman being driven into the Moon's surface. Nuclear Man, having taken an interest in Lacy, kidnaps her and takes her into outer space. Superman frees himself and creates a solar eclipse by moving the Moon out of orbit, depriving Nuclear Man of sunlight. Superman rescues Lacy and ultimately destroys Nuclear Man by trapping him in the core of a nuclear power plant. This converts Nuclear Man into electrical energy for the power grid.

Back in Metropolis, Perry White secures a loan to regain a controlling interest in the Daily Planet, reducing Warfield to a minority shareholder and ensuring the paper's independence. Superman apprehends the Luthors, placing Lenny in Boys Town and returning Lex to prison. In a closing speech, Superman acknowledges that world peace cannot be achieved overnight but remains committed to guiding humanity toward that goal.

== Cast ==
- Christopher Reeve as Clark Kent / Superman
- Gene Hackman as Lex Luthor
  - Hackman also provides the voice of Nuclear Man
- Mark Pillow as Nuclear Man
- Jackie Cooper as Perry White
- Marc McClure as Jimmy Olsen
- Jon Cryer as Lenny Luthor
- Sam Wanamaker as David Warfield
- Mariel Hemingway as Lacy Warfield
- Margot Kidder as Lois Lane
- Damian McLawhorn as Jeremy
- William Hootkins as Harry Howler
- Jim Broadbent as Jean Pierre Dubois
- Stanley Lebor as General Romoff
- Don Fellows as Levon Hornsby
- Robert Beatty as U.S. President
- Susannah York as Lara (voice)

== Production ==
=== Development and casting ===
Alexander Salkind and his son Ilya, the producers of the Superman series, planned to produce a fourth Superman film if Superman III grossed at least $40 million. The film received an unexpectedly negative reaction but still grossed $80.2 million. Christopher Reeve was also hesitant to return to the series as Superman, fearing typecasting. The Salkinds announced plans for a fourth film regardless, but after the commercial failures of Supergirl and their next film Santa Claus: The Movie caused them financial strain, they began to consider if the franchise had run its course.

After negotiations during the 38th Cannes Film Festival, Ilya Salkind agreed to sell the Superman franchise to Menahem Golan and Yoram Globus of The Cannon Group, Inc. for $5 million in June 1985. The studio enticed Reeve to return by offering him $6 million, financing for his pet project Street Smart, and approval over the story and director.

Reeve pitched a storyline focused on the nuclear arms race in protest of the breakdown of the Reykjavik Summit and US President Ronald Reagan's military buildup and skepticism towards arms control. His story was accepted, and he was also a candidate for director. Although he was allowed to direct some second unit scenes, he was ultimately deemed too inexperienced for the full-time job. Richard Donner claimed in the commentary for Superman II: The Richard Donner Cut that Cannon had asked him to return to the series, but he declined due to a scheduling conflict with Lethal Weapon. Wes Craven was originally hired by Cannon Films to direct the film, but he and Reeve did not get along well and Reeve demanded that a new director be brought in. Although Reeve recommended Ron Howard, Sidney J. Furie was hired.

=== Filming ===
Production of Superman IV began in 1986. In his autobiography, Still Me, Reeve described filming the movie:

We were also hampered by budget constraints and cutbacks in all departments. Cannon Films had nearly thirty projects in the works at the time, and Superman IV received no special consideration. For example, Konner and Rosenthal wrote a scene in which Superman lands on 42nd Street and walks down the double yellow lines to the United Nations, where he gives a speech. If that had been a scene in Superman I, we would actually have shot it on 42nd Street. Richard Donner would have choreographed hundreds of pedestrians and vehicles and cut to people gawking out of office windows at the sight of Superman walking down the street like the Pied Piper. Instead, we had to shoot at an industrial park in England in the rain with about a hundred extras, not a car in sight, and a dozen pigeons thrown in for atmosphere. Even if the story had been brilliant, I don't think that we could ever have lived up to the audience's expectations with this approach.

Rosenthal's DVD commentary cited this scene as an example of Cannon's budget-slashing. According to Rosenthal, Reeve and Furie begged to be able to film that sequence in New York in front of the real headquarters of the United Nations because everyone knew how they looked and the Milton Keynes setting looked nothing like them, but Cannon refused. According to Rosenthal, they were "pinching pennies at every step".

Shortly before production began at Elstree Studios on September 27, 1986, Cannon reduced the budget from $36 million to $17 million. Part of the problem was that Cannon financed its films by selling the television and home video rights in advance, which failed with films of a budget of over $5 million. The studio had also gone six years without a major hit. The studio was narrowly saved from bankruptcy after a deal with Warner Bros. Pictures to provide $75 million to repay its loans in exchange for distribution rights to its upcoming films, including Superman IV, which provided enough confidence in the studio for a $65 million line of credit from First Bank of Boston. During the production, the filming and special effects crews of the first three films were replaced with cheaper Israeli crews. Principal photography concluded at the beginning of January 1987.

According to Jon Cryer, who played Lex Luthor (Gene Hackman)'s nephew Lenny, Reeve had taken him aside just before the release and told him it was going to be "terrible." Although Cryer enjoyed working with Reeve and Hackman, he claimed that Cannon ran out of money during the production and ultimately released an unfinished film.

The film was shot at multiple locations around England. The Metropolis metro train scene at the beginning of the film was shot at the now abandoned Aldwych tube station, while the city of Milton Keynes was used to represent multiple locations: the Avebury Building was used for the Metropolis Hyatt Hotel and the Daily Planet's interiors, and Milton Keynes Central station was used for the UN Headquarters.

=== Deleted footage ===
According to writer Mark Rosenthal's commentary on the 2006 DVD, in the gallery of deleted scenes included on the disc, there are approximately 45 minutes of the film that have not been seen by the general public. They were deleted following a failed Southern California test screening. The Nuclear Man (Mark Pillow) that appears in the film is actually the second Nuclear Man that Luthor created. Cut scenes featured the original Nuclear Man (portrayed by Clive Mantle) engaging Superman in battle outside the Metro Club and being destroyed by the Man of Steel. The first Nuclear Man was somewhat more inhuman-looking than his successor, and resembled, in both looks and personality, the comic book character Bizarro. Luthor postulates that this Nuclear Man wasn't strong enough, and hatches the plan to create the second Nuclear Man within the Sun as a result.

Not all of the deleted scenes made it to the deluxe edition of the DVD, including a scene depicting Clark Kent visiting the graves of his foster parents Jonathan and Martha Kent (portrayed by Glenn Ford and Phyllis Thaxter in Superman). This scene was to have preceded the film's theatrical scene where Clark returns to Smallville to meet realtor Levon Hornsby (Don Fellows) in hopes of selling or leasing the Kent farm. A deleted scene about Lacy Warfield (Mariel Hemingway) and Clark Kent's romance, showing them dancing in the Metro Club, was also not released on disc. In March 2026, the footage of Metro Club was found.

== Music ==
The music for the film was adapted and conducted by Alexander Courage based on existing and new music composed by John Williams.

== Release ==
=== Theatrical ===
The film had a Royal premiere at the Leicester Square Theatre in London on July 23, 1987, attended by Prince Charles and Princess Diana.

== Reception ==
=== Box office ===
It was released on July 24, 1987, in the United Kingdom, the United States, and Canada. In the US and Canada, it opened in 1,511 theatres and grossed $5.6 million during its opening weekend, ranking fourth at the box office. In the UK, it opened on 234 screens and grossed £508,468 ($800,000) for the weekend becoming the number one film in the UK for the weekend. It failed to retain number one spot for the week, grossing £987,495 compared to The Living Daylights' £1,108,256. It was the eighth-highest-grossing film in the UK for the year with a gross of £3,457,959 ($5.5 million). The movie grossed $15.6 million in the United States and Canada, and $14.6 million internationally, for a worldwide box office gross of $30.2 to 36.7 million.

Of the four Superman films starring Reeve, The Quest for Peace fared the worst at the box office, and the series went dormant for the following 19 years. Reeve regretted his decision to be involved in the film, saying, "Superman IV was a catastrophe from start to finish. That failure was a huge blow to my career." Plans were made to make a Superman V, but they never came to fruition. Reeve's 1995 paralysis made any further development of sequels involving him in the starring role impossible. Time Warner let the Superman feature film franchise go undeveloped until the late 1990s, when a variety of proposals were considered, including several that would reboot the franchise with different versions of the characters and settings. Eventually in 2006, an alternative sequel of the series, Superman Returns, was released and disregarded the events of Superman III and The Quest for Peace, though the Arrowverse crossover event Crisis on Infinite Earths seemed to indicate that both Superman III and Returns were in the same canon.

=== Critical response ===
On review aggregator Rotten Tomatoes, the film holds a 17% score based on 127 reviews, with an average rating of 3.2/10. The site's critical consensus reads, "The Superman series bottoms with The Quest for Peace -- the action is boring, the special effects look cheaper, and none of the actors appear interested in where the plot's going." On Metacritic the film has a weighted average score of 24 out of 100, based on 18 critics, indicating "generally unfavorable reviews". Audiences polled by CinemaScore gave the film an average grade of "C" on an A+ to F scale.

The film received a poor review from Janet Maslin of The New York Times, although she wrote that Margot Kidder's portrayal of Lois Lane was "sexy, earnest". Variety wrote that "The earlier films in the series were far from perfect, but at their best they had some flair and agreeable humor, qualities this one sorely lacks." The Washington Post described it as "More sluggish than a funeral barge, cheaper than a sale at Kmart, it's a nerd, it's a shame, it's Superman IV." Several critics disliked the special effects.

The film was voted number 40 on a list of "The 50 Worst Movies Ever" by readers of Empire magazine. It was also nominated for two Golden Raspberry Awards: Worst Supporting Actress for Mariel Hemingway (lost to Daryl Hannah for Wall Street) and Worst Visual Effects (lost to Jaws: The Revenge) at the 8th Golden Raspberry Awards.

== Cancelled sequel ==
Before the failure of Superman IV: The Quest for Peace, Cannon Films considered producing a fifth film with Albert Pyun as director. Cannon's bankruptcy resulted in the film rights reverting to Alexander and Ilya Salkind. Under the Salkinds, their sequel was initially titled Superman: The New Movie but was later called Superman Reborn. The film was intended to revive and continue the franchise after Superman IV. Both Christopher Reeve and Margot Kidder were expected to reprise their roles. The villain would have been Brainiac. The story had Superman dying and resurrecting in the shrunken, bottled Krypton city of Kandor. The premise of Superman's death and rebirth coincidentally predated the 1992 "The Death of Superman" comic book storyline.

On November 12, 2024, a recorded live script reading performance of Superman Reborn took place in Hollywood, California. There was a third draft of the story that leaked on the Internet many years later, but it was not the draft that was used. What was used was a never-before-seen first draft that was approved by producer Ilya Salkind and writers Mark Jones and Cary Bates before getting revision notes from Warner Bros/DC at the time. There are some major differences between the drafts.

The performance was immediately followed by a live Q&A with producer Ilya Salkind and writer Mark Jones. Cary Bates was invited but was unable to attend. During the live Q&A, Jones and Salkind revealed that George P. Cosmatos was originally attached to direct before he and Salkind clashed. The recording was posted on David Kocher's YouTube channel on February 13, 2025.

== Other media ==
In late 1987, DC Comics prepared a comic book adaptation of Superman IV, scripted by Bob Rozakis and pencilled by Curt Swan and Don Heck. This edition included different dialogue from the film and incidents from the deleted scenes of the movie. In place of a voice-over from Lara (Susannah York) in the early scene involving Superman finding the mysterious crystal, there is a projection of Jor-El himself, much like in the first film. The comic book features a battle with the failed prototype of Nuclear Man resembling Bizarro and an around-the-world fight with the second Nuclear Man. The adaptation has an alternate ending with Superman and Jeremy flying above Earth, observing that the planet is, in reality, just one world, rather than the divided world one sees on a man-made map. In the adaptation, Jeremy is seen in orbit with a space suit, but in the deleted footage from the film, Jeremy (portrayed by Damian McLawthorn) is not wearing any vacuum protection of any kind, as was Lacy Warfield when she was rescued from the second Nuclear Man by Superman. The alternate ending appears in the Deluxe Edition DVD, incorporated in the deleted footage section.

There was also a novelization written by Bonnie Bryant, in which scenes based on deleted footage are included. The novelization was released in 1987, along with the premiere of the film.
