= Lois Lane (1978 film series character) =

Fictional character in Superman films

- Superman character
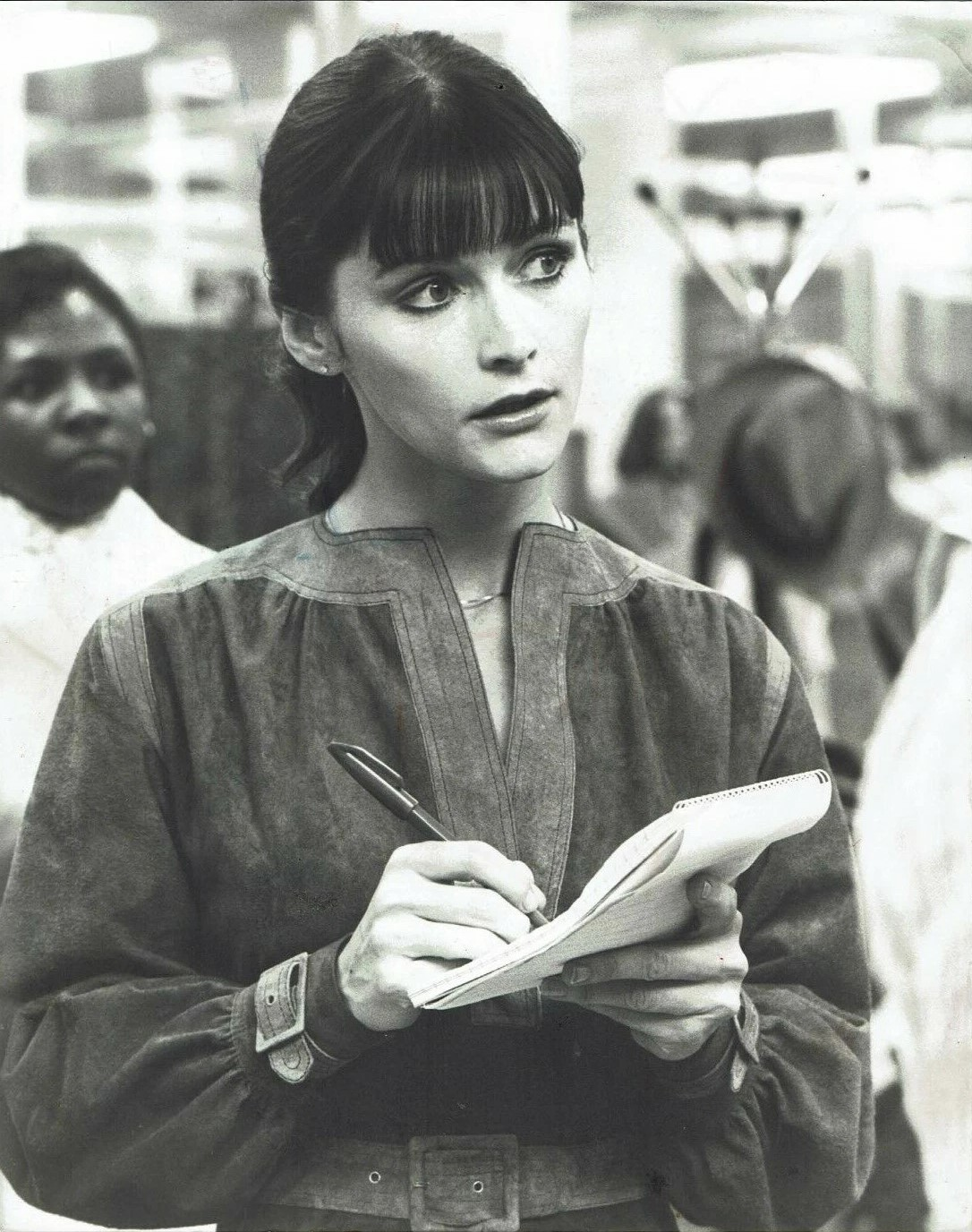
- Margot Kidder as Lois Lane in Superman (1978)
- First appearance: Superman (1978)
- Last appearance: Superman '78 The Metal Curtain #6 (2024)
- Based on: Lois Lane by: Jerry Siegel; Joe Shuster
- Adapted by: Mario Puzo; David Newman; Leslie Newman; Robert Benton
- Portrayed by: Margot Kidder

In-universe information
- Full name: Lois Lane
- Occupation: Journalist
- Family: Sam Lane (father); Ella Lane (mother); Lucy Lane (sister)
- Significant other: Superman
- Home: Metropolis

Lois Lane is a fictional character portrayed by Canadian-born actress Margot Kidder in the Warner Bros. Superman film series produced by Ilya and Alexander Salkind, and is an adaption of the original comic book character. Kidder played Lois Lane opposite Christopher Reeve in Superman (1978), Superman II (1980), Superman III (1983), and Superman IV: The Quest for Peace (1987). The role proved to be Kidder's most notable, catapulting her to international fame, and this iteration of Lois Lane has been considered one of the most iconic love interests in superhero films.

The 2006 film Superman Returns follows an alternate continuity from the first two films, with Kate Bosworth portraying a later iteration of the character.

== Development ==
Actress Margot Kidder was cast as Lois Lane, Superman's primary love interest, because her performance had a certain spark and vitality, and because of her strong interaction with Christopher Reeve. Over 100 actresses were considered for the role. Margot Kidder (suggested by Stalmaster), Anne Archer, Susan Blakely, Lesley Ann Warren, Deborah Raffin and Stockard Channing screen tested from March through May 1977. The final decision was between Channing and Kidder, with the latter winning the role. Footage of Warren's screen test has been included as a supplementary feature on VHS and DVD releases of the film.

In the spring of 1977, only one month before principal photography was scheduled to begin. Kidder was subsequently flown to England for screen-tests. Upon meeting with director Richard Donner, Kidder tripped while walking into the room. Donner recalled: "I just fell in love with her. It was perfect, this clumsy [behavior]." She was ultimately cast in the role, which would become her most iconic. Filming lasted approximately eighteen months.

Following Christopher Reeve's paralysis, Margot Kidder dismissed the notion of a Superman curse, remarking in a 2002 interview, "That is all newspaper-created rubbish. The idea cracks me up. What about the luck of Superman? When my car crashed this August, if I hadn't hit a telegraph pole after rolling three times, I would have dropped down a 50ft to 60ft ravine. Why don't people focus on that?"

Margot Kidder was flattered when cinematographer Geoffrey Unsworth arranged lighting for her shots in the first Superman film and insisted on concentration by saying "Quiet, I'm lighting the Lady." H Wendy Leech doubled for Margot Kidder in Superman II. Leech, who is the daughter of James Bond stunt performer George Leech, met her husband Vic Armstrong, who served as Christopher Reeve's double for the first two Superman films. Kazuko Yanaga provided the Japanese dubbing for Margot Kidder in Superman IV: The Quest for Peace. Hiroe Oka and Sayaka Kobayashi also dubbed for Kidder's Lois Lane in Japanese.

Kidder later appeared in two episodes of The WB/The CW television series Smallville as Dr. Bridgette Crosby, an emissary of Dr. Virgil Swann (played by Christopher Reeve). She declined to make a third appearance on the show after Reeve's death because she felt it would be doing his memory a disservice. Through her appearances in the Superman films, Kidder maintained a close friendship with her co-star Reeve, which lasted from 1978 until his death in 2004: "When you're strapped to someone hanging from the ceiling for months and months, you get pretty darned close," Kidder told CBS. "He was such a huge part of my life... He was complicated, very smart, really smart, and he knew he'd done something meaningful. He was very aware of that and very happy with that role."

During the production of Superman Returns, Kevin Spacey, who played Lex Luthor in that film, recommended director Bryan Singer to cast Kate Bosworth in the role of Lois Lane because she co-starred with Spacey in Beyond the Sea (2004) as Sandra Dee. Claire Danes and Keri Russell were reportedly considered for the role. Amy Adams, who would later be cast as Lois Lane in the 2013 reboot Man of Steel, confirmed in an interview that she had also auditioned for Lois in 2005. Adams had previously auditioned for Lois in 2003 when Brett Ratner was planning to direct Superman: Flyby. Bosworth studied Katharine Hepburn's acting for inspiration, particularly in The Philadelphia Story (1940) and Guess Who's Coming to Dinner (1967), as well as Julia Roberts in Erin Brockovich (2000).

=== Portrayal and characteristics ===
The filmmakers had a very specific concept for Lois: liberated, hard-nosed, witty and attractive. Kidder was cast because Richard Donner and the producers agreed that her performance had a certain spark and vitality, and because of her strong interaction with Christopher Reeve. Donner felt that Kidder seemed to convey the general American concept of Lois Lane—pretty, pert and perky, intelligent and ambitious without being pushy. During filming, Donner noticed that when Kidder wasn't wearing her contact lenses, "she kept her eyes really wide" and moved around in a clumsier way. He said it "gave her this wonderful character" and instructed her to not wear them on camera for the duration of the shoot. One of the most important aspects in the first and second films was the romantic relationship between the two main characters; Clark was hopelessly in love with Lois and even gave up his powers to be with her.

== Timelines ==
=== Original continuity ===
==== Superman (1978) ====
Lois meets Clark Kent (Christopher Reeve) when he begins working at the Daily Planet newspaper. She is introduced to his Superman persona when he rescues her from a helicopter accident. Lois quickly becomes enamoured with Superman and accepts his offer to be interviewed for the newspaper. During the interview, she learns about Superman's homeworld, his abilities, and takes a fly in the sky over Metropolis. Lois later dies in an earthquake caused by Lex Luthor (Gene Hackman) in the climax of the first film. Superman is so distraught by her death that he flies around the globe at supernatural speed, travelling backward in time and preventing the earthquake from occurring, saving Lois' life.

A scene in the film shows young Clark Kent outrunning a passenger train, with a little girl, played by an unknown actress (Cathy Marcotte), on-board observing him. The extended version of the scene shows the girl to be a young Lois telling her parents (portrayed by Kirk Alyn and Noel Neill in uncredited cameos) without them believing her.

==== Superman II (1980) ====
After she finds out that Clark is Superman, Clark tells Lois more about himself, flying her to the Fortress of Solitude and revealing that he loves her. Wanting to spend his life with Lois, Clark uses a Kryptonian device to alter his DNA, making him human. Soon after, Clark and Lois learn that three Kryptonians, led by General Zod (Terence Stamp), have arrived on Earth and are threatening humanity. Clark decides to restore his powers and defeats the Kryptonians. Later, Clark finds Lois upset about knowing his secret and not being able to be open about her true feelings. Clark kisses Lois, using his abilities to wipe her mind of her knowledge of the past few days.

In the completed "Donner Cut", which was released after Superman Returns, there are some subtle differences in Lois' arc. An early screen test between Reeve and Kidder for the first movie was used for the scene in which Lois finds out Clark's secret identity by coercing him at gunpoint with a pistol filled with blanks. In addition, Lois breaks up with Clark at the end, unable to deal with his dual identity as Superman, causing him to fly around the globe at supernatural speed and travel backward in time to undo the events of the film, including Lois finding his identity and leaving him, while ensuring Zod and his sidekicks never escape the Phantom Zone, similar to the first film.

Following the release of Superman in December 1978, Richard Donner was controversially fired as director, and was replaced by Richard Lester. Several members of the cast and crew declined to return in the wake of Donner's firing. In order to be officially credited as the director, Lester re-shot most of the film in which principal photography resumed in September 1979 and ended in March 1980. Due to budgetary reasons and actors being unavailable, key scenes filmed by Donner were added to the final film. Since the Lester footage was shot two years later, continuity errors are present in the physique and styling of stars Margot Kidder and Christopher Reeve.

In Donner's footage, Reeve appears less bulked as he was still gaining muscle for the part. Kidder also has dramatic changes throughout; in the montage of Lester-Donner material, shot inside the Daily Planet and the Fortress of Solitude near the movie's conclusion, her hairstyle, hair color, and even make-up are all inconsistent. Kidder's physical appearance in the Lester footage is noticeably different; during the scenes shot for Donner she appears slender, whereas in the Lester footage she looks thinner.

To replace creative consultant Tom Mankiewicz, Superman co-screenwriters David and Leslie Newman were then brought back to re-tool the script constructing a new opening and ending. The new script featured newly conceived scenes such as a new opening involving Superman thwarting the nuclear terrorists at the Eiffel Tower, Clark rescuing Lois at Niagara Falls, and a new ending in which Clark causes Lois to forget his secret identity through a hypnotic kiss.

==== Superman III (1983) and Superman IV: The Quest for Peace (1987) ====
Lois' role was notably small in Superman III, consisting of 12 lines and less than five minutes of footage. She is away from Metropolis on vacation to Bermuda, which put her in the middle of a front-page story.

Both Gene Hackman and Margot Kidder are said to have been angry with the way the Salkinds treated Superman director Richard Donner, with Hackman retaliating by refusing to reprise the role of Lex Luthor. After Margot Kidder publicly criticized the Salkinds for their treatment of Donner, the producers reportedly "punished" the actress by reducing her role in Superman III to a brief appearance. Hackman later denied such claims, stating that he had been busy with other movies and general consensus that making Luthor a constant villain would be akin to incessant horror movie sequels where a serial killer keeps coming back from the grave.

In his commentary for the 2006 DVD release of Superman III, Ilya Salkind denied any ill will between Margot Kidder and his production team and denied the claim that her part was cut for retaliation. Instead, he said, the creative team decided to pursue a different direction for a love interest for Superman, believing the Lois and Clark relationship had been played out in the first two films (but could be revisited in the future). With the choice to give a more prominent role to Lana Lang, Lois' part was reduced for story reasons.

Kidder and Hackman subsequently reprised their roles as Lois Lane and Lex Luthor, respectively, in Superman IV: The Quest for Peace (1987), with which the Salkinds had no involvement. Kidder filmed her parts in 1986. The film is regarded as one of the worst films of all time.

=== Superman Returns ===
Lois Lane
- Superman Returns character
- First appearance: Superman Returns (2006)
- Last appearance: Superman Returns (2006)
- Based on: Lois Lane by Jerry Siegel Joe Shuster
- Adapted by: Bryan Singer; Michael Dougherty; Dan Harris
- Portrayed by: Kate Bosworth

In-universe information
- Full name: Lois Lane
- Occupation: Journalist
- Family: Sam Lane (father); Ella Lane (mother); Lucy Lane (sister)
- Significant others: Superman; Richard White
- Children: Jason White (son)
- Home: Metropolis

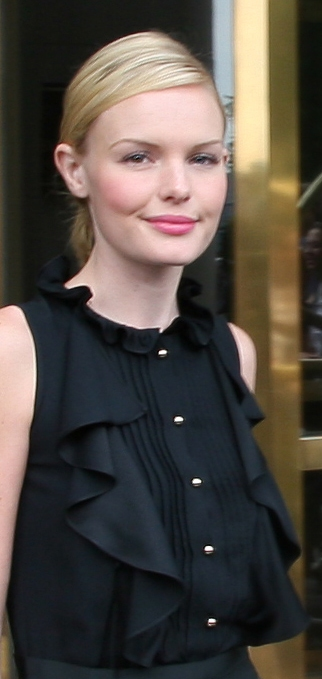
Kate Bosworth was cast as Lois Lane in Superman Returns.

In alternate continuity from the first two films, Superman (now portrayed by Brandon Routh) returns to Earth after five years travelling in space to investigate what he believed to be his home planet Krypton. Upon returning to Metropolis as his alter-ego reporter Clark Kent, he is shocked to discover the consequences of his disappearance. In his absence, Lois (now portrayed by Kate Bosworth) is engaged to Perry White's (Frank Langella) nephew, Richard (James Marsden) and shares a young son, Jason (Tristan Lake Leabu), with Richard. Lois had also penned an editorial titled "Why the World Doesn't Need Superman" in the wake of his absence. The criminal mastermind Lex Luthor (now played by Kevin Spacey) was released from prison because Superman did not testify against Luthor during his appeal trial. After seducing an old heiress, Luthor inherits her fortune and begins his plot against Superman.

Superman reemerges to the world when he saves a space shuttle test launch during a mysterious nationwide power outage, triggered by Luthor using Kryptonian technology. Lois, investigating the power outage, tracks the source to a mansion owned by Luthor. Along with her son, she is then held captive on a superyacht heading into the Atlantic Ocean. Luthor plans to use the Kryptonian crystal, stolen from the Fortress of Solitude, to create a new land mass, which in turn will destroy the United States.

Aboard the yacht, Lois manages to fax over a message for help to the Daily Planet, which is received by Richard and Clark. However, one of Luthor's henchmen catches her and attempts to attack Lois, causing Jason's superpower to emerge and crush the henchman with a piano, revealing Jason is, in fact, Superman's son. Luthor and his men escape by helicopter. While Superman works to contain the damage in the city, Richard reaches the yacht with a small plane. When the boat starts to sink, the three of them become trapped and Lois is knocked unconscious. Superman rescues them in time and takes them to Richard's plane for safety. Superman pursues Luthor, who has made his way to the new landmass infused with kryptonite. Luthor easily defeats Superman, stabbing him with a kryptonite shard and leaving him to drown in the sea. Regaining consciousness, Lois, knowing of the kryptonite danger, convinces Richard to turn the plane around. They spot Superman in the water and take him into the plane, where Lois removes the kryptonite shard. Recovered, Superman flies the landmass into outer space.

Complications from kryptonite exposure cause Superman to fall into a coma. Lois visits him in the hospital and whispers in his ear concerning Jason's paternity. Soon after, Superman visits Jason and repeats the words of his own father as Jason sleeps, while Lois starts to write an editorial titled "Why the World Needs Superman".

=== Arrowverse ===
Years later, Lois along with Perry, Jimmy, and her other co-workers were killed, when a "reject from Gotham" gassed the Daily Planet. Since the incident, Clark has donned an outfit similar to the Kingdom Come version of Superman.

== Other appearances ==
As part of Kidder serving as a guest host on the March 17, 1979 episode of Saturday Night Live, she would parody her Lois Lane role in a sketch called "Superhero Party". Also featured in the sketch were Superman (Bill Murray), Flash (Dan Aykroyd), Lana Lang (Jane Curtin), Hulk (John Belushi), Thing, Spider-Man, Spider-Woman, Ant-Man (Garrett Morris), and Invisible Girl.

== Reception ==
Superman was released during Christmas 1978 and was a major commercial success, grossing $300 million worldwide. Kidder won a Saturn Award for Best Actress for her performance, which was deemed "most charming" by Vincent Canby in The New York Times. Kidder's performances continued to be highlights of the subsequent films produced in the 1980s, even in the lambasted Superman IV: The Quest for Peace, as Janet Maslin of The New York Times wrote that Kidder's portrayal of Lois Lane was "sexy, earnest" in an otherwise negative review of that film.

Margot Kidder's performance as Lois Lane is now considered the greatest of the character in film. In 2016, ScreenRant listed Lois Lane and Superman as portrayed in the 1978–87 film series its most iconic couple in superhero films and TV series, noting that Kidder and Reeve's performances were "so perfect that none of the other versions", referring to other live-action performances of Superman and Lois, "could live up to their chemistry".

In a piece commemorating Margot Kidder after her death in 2018, Sonia Saraiya of Vanity Fair praised Kidder's performance as Lois Lane, writing that "Kidder played a human woman who could believably both attract and deserve a man who is canonically perfect, with the physique of a Greek god and the moral compass of a saint." Saraiya specifically noted Kidder's ability to balance Lois's laid-back, ditzy nature with her ambition and no-nonsense attitude, proving to be a worthy foil to Reeve's Clark Kent/Superman.

Also following Kidder's death, DC Comics stated on its Twitter feed: "Thank you for being the Lois Lane so many of us grew up with. RIP, Margot Kidder".

Upon Kate Bosworth taking on the role of Lois in Superman Returns, critics responded more harshly to her performance. Mick LaSalle of the San Francisco Chronicle opined that Bosworth, who was 22 at the time, was too young to play Lois Lane, while Joe Morgenstern from The Wall Street Journal described Bosworth's acting, in addition to Brandon Routh's, "somewhat dead or super average. Nothing special." Anthony Lane of The New Yorker noted, "The new Lois Lane, Kate Bosworth, is not a patch on Margot Kidder, or, for that matter, on Teri Hatcher, in the TV series."

Although Bosworth's performance was ambivalently received, she herself loved the experience of working on the movie. As she told Teen Vogue in August 2006, "You know how you have an experience, a time in your life when you feel you've come into your own? When you grow up a bit, and think, Now I get it? [...] That's how I feel. I feel a little bit more complete."

=== Influence on other portrayals of Lois Lane ===
Smallville series developer Al Gough contends that it was always the producer's intention to bring in the iconic Lois Lane, they just needed a good reason to do it—Chloe Sullivan's supposed death at the end of season three appeared to be that reason. Gough explains that, when casting for the role, they looked to Margot Kidder—Lois Lane in the Superman film series—for inspiration. They wanted an actress who was "pretty", "smart", and who came with some "wit". Dozens of actresses auditioned for the role of Lois Lane, but it was not until a tape from Erica Durance showed up that everyone felt that they had found the right Lois. As executive producer Greg Beeman describes Durance, "She had a toughness about her. She was tough and sexy and direct."

Before the end of Smallville's seventh season, IGN's Daniel Phillips compared the actresses who have portrayed the character of Lois Lane over the past three decades. Up against the most recognizable version of Lois Lane, Margot Kidder, the 2006 film incarnation played by Kate Bosworth, and the previous live-action television version portrayed by Teri Hatcher, Erica Durance was rated the highest. Although Phillips acknowledges that Kidder is the best representation of Lois' personality, he claims that Durance is the best overall embodiment of the character. Apart from her beauty, Phillips states, "Durance makes Lois intelligent, capable, funny and dangerously curious – exactly the type of woman Clark Kent would fall for."

== See also ==
- Lois Lane (DC Extended Universe)
- Lois Lane in other media
