= Superman (1978 film series character) =

Fictional character in the Warner Bros film series

- Superman character
- Christopher Reeve as Superman.
- First appearance: Superman (1978)
- Last appearance: Superman '78 The Metal Curtain #6 (2024)
- Based on: Superman by: Jerry Siegel; Joe Shuster
- Adapted by: Mario Puzo; David Newman; Leslie Newman; Robert Benton
- Portrayed by: Christopher Reeve; Jeff East

In-universe information
- Aliases: Kal-El (birth name); Clark Kent (adoptive name)
- Species: Kryptonian
- Family: Jor-El (father); Lara (mother); Jonathan Kent (adoptive father); Martha Kent (adoptive mother); Kara Zor-El (cousin); Zor-El (uncle); Alura (aunt)
- Significant other: Lois Lane
- Nationality: American
- Abilities: Invulnerability, superhuman strength, speed, sight, and hearing, frost breath, heat vision, X-ray vision, flight, amnesia-inducing touch

Superman (Kal-El) or Clark Kent is a fictional character portrayed by Christopher Reeve in the Warner Bros. Superman film series produced by Ilya and Alexander Salkind and Cannon Films, and is an adaptation of the original DC Comics character, Superman. Many actors were interviewed for the part before Christopher Reeve was chosen to fill the role. Superman is portrayed as a superhero who stands for "truth, justice, and the American way".

The character was received positively and Reeve's performance is ranked as one of the best in superhero films.

The 2006 film Superman Returns served as an alternate sequel to the first two Reeve films while ignoring the events of Superman III and Superman IV: The Quest For Peace, with Brandon Routh portraying a version of this iteration in an alternate timeline, after Reeve's paralysis in 1995 and death in 2004. The film was dedicated to both him and his wife, Dana, who died two years after her husband's death and shortly before its release. A CGI version of Reeve as Superman makes a cameo in the DC Extended Universe (DCEU) film The Flash (2023), which retroactively incorporates him into the franchise's multiverse, alongside a de-aged Helen Slater as Supergirl.

== Development ==
=== Christopher Reeve ===
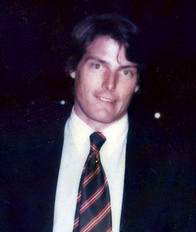
Christopher Reeve, the actor chosen for the original film series

The development process behind the creation of DC Comics' character Superman in the Superman film by Mario Puzo, David Newman, Leslie Newman and Robert Benton began when Ilya Salkind bought the film rights for the character. Many A-list directors and actors were considered until Richard Donner took over the directing duties and Christopher Reeve was chosen for the part. Originally Reeve's picture and résumé was rejected many times and Reeve thought that he would not get the part after being self-described as a "skinny WASP." His appearance was originally very slim. He refused to wear fake muscles and instead went on a training regimen, supervised by former British weightlifting champion David Prowse, which consisted of running in the morning, followed by two hours of weightlifting and ninety minutes on a trampoline. Reeve also doubled his food intake and adopted a high protein diet. He added 30 pounds (14 kg) of muscle to his thin 188-pound frame. He later made even greater gains for Superman III (1983), though for Superman IV: The Quest for Peace (1987), he decided it would be healthier to focus more on cardiovascular workouts. One of the reasons Reeve could not work out as much for Superman IV: The Quest for Peace was an emergency appendectomy he had undergone in June 1986.

Reeve was never a Superman or comic book fan, though he had watched the television program Adventures of Superman starring George Reeves. Reeve found the role offered a suitable challenge because it was a dual role. He said, "there must be some difference stylistically between Clark and Superman. Otherwise, you just have a pair of glasses standing in for a character".

=== Jeff East ===
Jeff East portrays teenage Clark Kent. His lines were overdubbed by Reeve during post-production. "I was not happy about it because the producers never told me what they had in mind", East commented. "It was done without my permission but it turned out to be okay. Chris did a good job but it caused tension between us. We resolved our issues with each other years later." East tore several thigh muscles while performing the stunt of racing alongside the train. It took three to four hours each day to add prosthetic makeup to his face so he resembled Reeve.

=== Brandon Routh ===
Various actors including Jerry O'Connell (who later voiced the DCAMU version of the character), Henry Cavill (who auditioned for J. J. Abrams's cancelled 2004 film Superman Flyby and eventually played Clark Kent in the DCEU), Daniel Cudmore (who later played an armored Bizzaro in Superman & Lois), Paul Walker, Will Smith, Josh Hartnett, Matt Bomer, Brendan Fraser, Ashton Kutcher, David Boreanaz, Hayden Christensen, Ian Somerhalder, Jim Caviezel, Jason Behr, Jared Padalecki, and Ryan McPartlin were all considered for the role before Routh was cast. Director Bryan Singer believed only an unknown actor would be suitable for the part of Superman. Brandon Routh was chosen from thousands of candidates interviewed at casting calls in the United States, United Kingdom, Canada and Australia. He had coincidentally auditioned for Clark Kent in the television series Smallville, but lost to Tom Welling. Routh had also met director Joseph "McG" Nichol for the role during pre-production of Superman: Flyby. Dana Reeve, wife of Christopher Reeve, believed Routh's physical resemblance to her late husband was striking. To obtain the muscular physique to play Superman convincingly, Routh underwent a strict bodybuilding exercise regimen. He also opted further in preparation to study Reeve's performance by watching the original film many times and subsequent features behind the scenes as well.

== Portrayal and characteristics ==
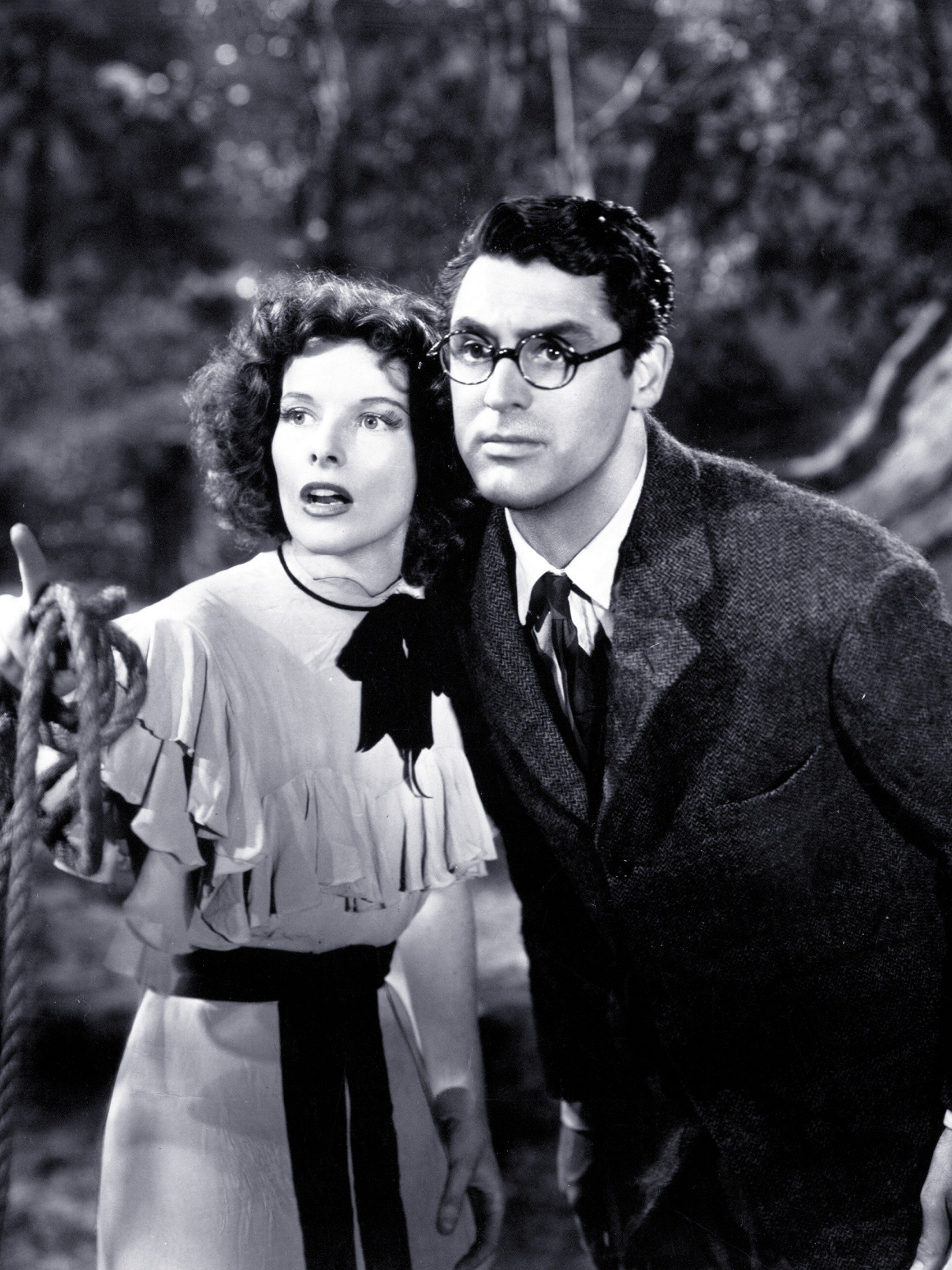
Christopher Reeve modeled his portrayal of Clark Kent on Cary Grant's performance in Bringing Up Baby (as depicted right)

Christopher Reeve first imagined the approach of his role on a flight to London. He felt that in the 1970s, the masculine image had changed and that it was acceptable "for a man to show gentleness and vulnerability". He also felt "that the new Superman ought to reflect that contemporary male image". Reeve would base his portrayal of Clark Kent, Superman's alter ego, on Cary Grant's performance for his role in the 1936 film Bringing Up Baby. Superman's personality as depicted in the films is a do gooder with little or no conflict who stands for "truth, justice and the American way" — a recurring theme shared by the character in the original The Adventures of Superman radio program. The noble Superman portrayed by Reeve, though, hides his secret identity by pretending to be an awkward and apprehensive reporter named Clark Kent. Lois Lane is indifferent to him but shares his obsession over Superman. Reeve felt that even though Superman upholds "truth, justice, and the American way" there was nothing self-conscious about him — that was simply what he believed in.

== Themes ==
"You will travel far, my little Kal-El. But we will never leave you, even in the face of our deaths. The richness of our lives shall be yours. All that I have, all that I've learned, everything I feel—all this and more I bequeath you, my son. You will carry me inside you all the days of your life. You will make my strength your own, and see my life through your eyes, as your life will be seen through mine. The son becomes the father and the father the son. This is all I, all I can send you, Kal-El."

— Jor-El

The Superman character has been cited as a metaphor for Christ and has actions compared to many religious themes. Many have noted the examples of apparent Christian symbolism. Donner, Tom Mankiewicz and Ilya Salkind have commented on the use of Christian references when discussing the themes of Superman. Mankiewicz deliberately fostered analogies with Jor-El as God and Kal-El as Jesus. Donner is somewhat skeptical of Mankiewicz' actions, joking,"I got enough death threats because of that".

The mythic status of Superman is enhanced by events that recall the hero's journey (or monomyth) as described by Joseph Campbell. Each act has a discernible cycle of "call" and journey. The journey is from Krypton to Earth in the first act, from Smallville to the Fortress of Solitude in the second act, and then from Metropolis to the whole world in the third act.

The spacecraft that brings Kal-El to Earth is shaped in the form of a star (Star of Bethlehem). Kal-El comes to Jonathan and Martha Kent, who are unable to have children. Martha Kent states, "All these years how we've prayed and prayed that the good Lord would see fit to give us a child" — comparing her to the Virgin Mary.

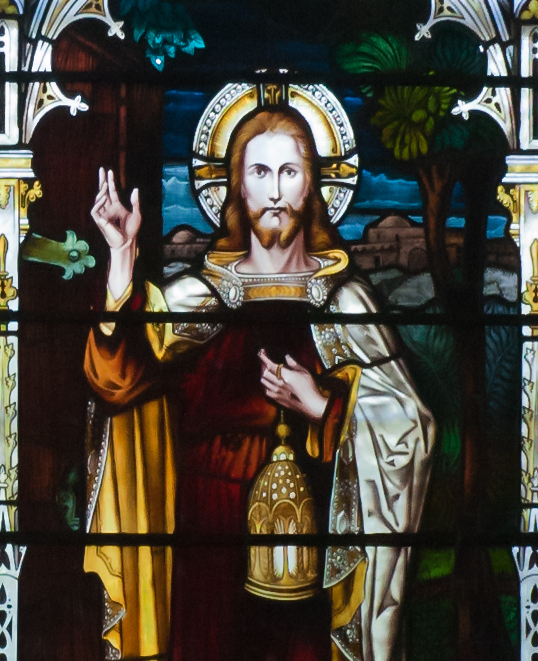
Jor-El's quote to Kal-El on humanity lacking the light has been called a metaphor of Jesus (as commonly depicted above) being the Light of the World

Just as little is known about Jesus during his middle years, Clark travels into the wilderness to find out who he is and what he has to do. Jor-El says

Live as one of them, Kal-El, to discover where your strength and power are needed. But always hold in your heart the pride of your special heritage. They can be a great people, Kal-El, and they wish to be. They only lack the light to show the way. For this reason above all, their capacity for good, I have sent them you, my only son.

The theme resembles the Biblical account of God sending his only son Jesus to Earth for the good of mankind. More symbolism was seen when Donner was able to complete Superman II: The Richard Donner Cut, featuring the fall, resurrection and battle with evil, which parallels the crucifixion of Jesus, the resurrection and the Harrowing of Hell. Another vision was that of The Creation of Adam.

The Christian imagery in the Reeve films has provoked comment on the Jewish origin of Superman. Rabbi Simcha Weinstein's book Up, Up and Oy Vey: How Jewish History, Culture and Values Shaped the Comic Book Superhero, says that Superman is both a pillar of society and one whose cape conceals a "nebbish", saying "He's a bumbling, nebbish Jewish stereotype. He's Woody Allen." Ironically, it is also in the Reeve films that Clark Kent's persona has the greatest resemblance to Woody Allen, though his conscious model was Cary Grant's character in Bringing Up Baby. This same theme is mirrored in other 1940s superheroes.

In the scene where Lois Lane interviews Superman on the balcony, Superman replies, "I never lie". Salkind felt this was an important point in the film, since Superman, living under his secret identity as Clark Kent, is "telling the biggest lie of all time". His romance with Lois also leads him to contradict Jor-El's orders to avoid altering human history, time traveling to save her from dying. Superman instead takes the advice of Jonathan Kent, his father on Earth. One of the most important aspects in the first and second films was the romantic relationship between the two main characters; Clark was hopelessly in love with Lois and even gave up his powers to be with her as depicted in Superman II.

== Role in the franchise ==
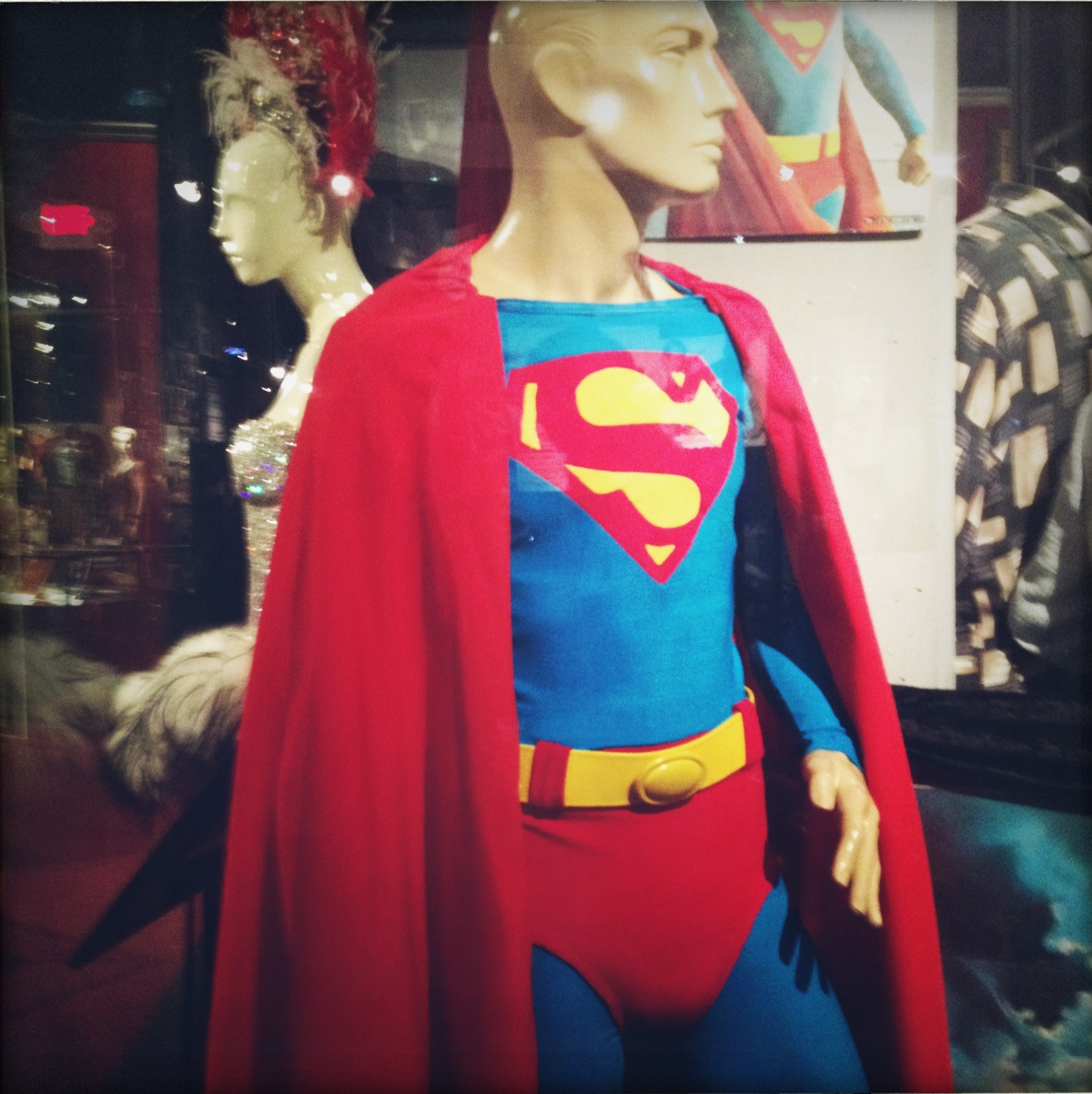
The Superman costume used in the film at the Hollywood Museum

The Superman film relates the origin of Superman as it depicts baby Kal-El escaping from the doomed planet Krypton to Earth. It tells of his life in Smallville to Metropolis, where he falls in love with Lois Lane and goes up against the villain Lex Luthor. Superman II focuses more on his romance with Lois and depicts him battling the Kryptonians, General Zod, Ursa and Non. In Superman III, he is reunited with his high school crush, Lana Lang. He deals with an evil businessman who forces a computer hacker to create technology that plays havoc with the world, while turning Superman evil. Superman IV: The Quest for Peace shows Superman deciding to rid the world of all nuclear missiles. Once again he comes face to face with Luthor and his new creation from Superman's DNA called Nuclear Man. Christopher Reeve was originally planned to make a cameo appearance in the 1984 Supergirl spin-off film starring Helen Slater as Superman's cousin, but bowed out early on.

=== Superman (1978) ===
In 1973, producer Ilya Salkind convinced his father Alexander to buy the rights to Superman. They hired Mario Puzo to pen a two-film script, and negotiated with Steven Spielberg to direct, though Alexander Salkind eventually chose someone else. Marlon Brando and Gene Hackman signed on to play Jor-El and Lex Luthor respectively, and Guy Hamilton was hired to direct. However, Brando was faced with an obscenity lawsuit in Italy over Last Tango in Paris, and Hamilton was unable to shoot in England as he had violated his tax payments. The Salkinds hired Richard Donner to direct the film. Donner hired Tom Mankiewicz to polish the script, giving it a serious feel with Christ-like overtones. Christopher Reeve was cast as Superman. The film was a success both critically and commercially; being released during the Christmas season of 1978, it did not have much competition, leading the producers to believe that this was one factor in the film's success.

=== Superman II (1980) ===
Shooting of the two films was marred by Donner's bad relationship with the Salkinds, with Richard Lester acting as mediator. With the film going over-budget, the filmmakers decided to temporarily cease production of II and move that film's climax into the first film. Despite Superman's success, Donner did not return to finish Superman II, and it was completed with Lester, who gave the film a more tongue-in-cheek tone. Superman II was another financial and critical success, despite stiff competition with Raiders of the Lost Ark in the same year. In 2006, after receiving many requests for his own version of Superman II, Richard Donner and producer Michael Thau produced their own cut of the film and released it on November 28, 2006. The new version of the film received positive response from critics and the stars of the original film.

=== Superman III (1983) ===
For the third installment, Ilya Salkind wrote a treatment that expanded the film's scope to a cosmic scale, introducing the villains Brainiac and Mister Mxyzptlk, as well as Supergirl. Warner Bros. rejected it and created their own Superman III film that co-starred Richard Pryor as computer wizard Gus Gorman, who under the manipulation of a millionaire magnate, creates a form of Kryptonite that turns the Man of Steel into an evil self. The retooled script pared Brainiac down into the film's evil "ultimate computer". Despite the film's success, fans were disappointed with the film, in particular with Pryor's performance diluting the serious tone of the previous films, as well as controversy over the depiction of the evil Superman. Salkind's rejected proposal was later released online in 2007.

=== Supergirl (1984) ===
Upon gaining the rights for the film Superman, Alexander Salkind and his son, Ilya Salkind, also purchased the rights to the character of Superman's cousin Supergirl. Supergirl was released in 1984 as a spin-off of the Reeve films; Reeve was slated to have a cameo but he ultimately backed out of the production, although his likeness appears in a photo. It stars Helen Slater in her first motion picture in the title role, while Faye Dunaway (who received top billing) played the primary villain, Selena; the film also featured Marc McClure reprising his role as Jimmy Olsen. Even though the film performed poorly at the box office, Helen Slater was nominated for a Saturn Award.

=== Superman IV: The Quest for Peace (1987) ===
Cannon Films picked up an option for a fourth Superman/Reeve film, with Reeve reprising the role due to his interest in the film's topic regarding nuclear weapons. However, Cannon decided to cut the budget resulting in poor special effects and heavy re-editing, which contributed to the film's poor reception. Warner Bros. decided to give the series a break following the negative reception of the last two Superman films.

=== Superman Returns (2006) ===
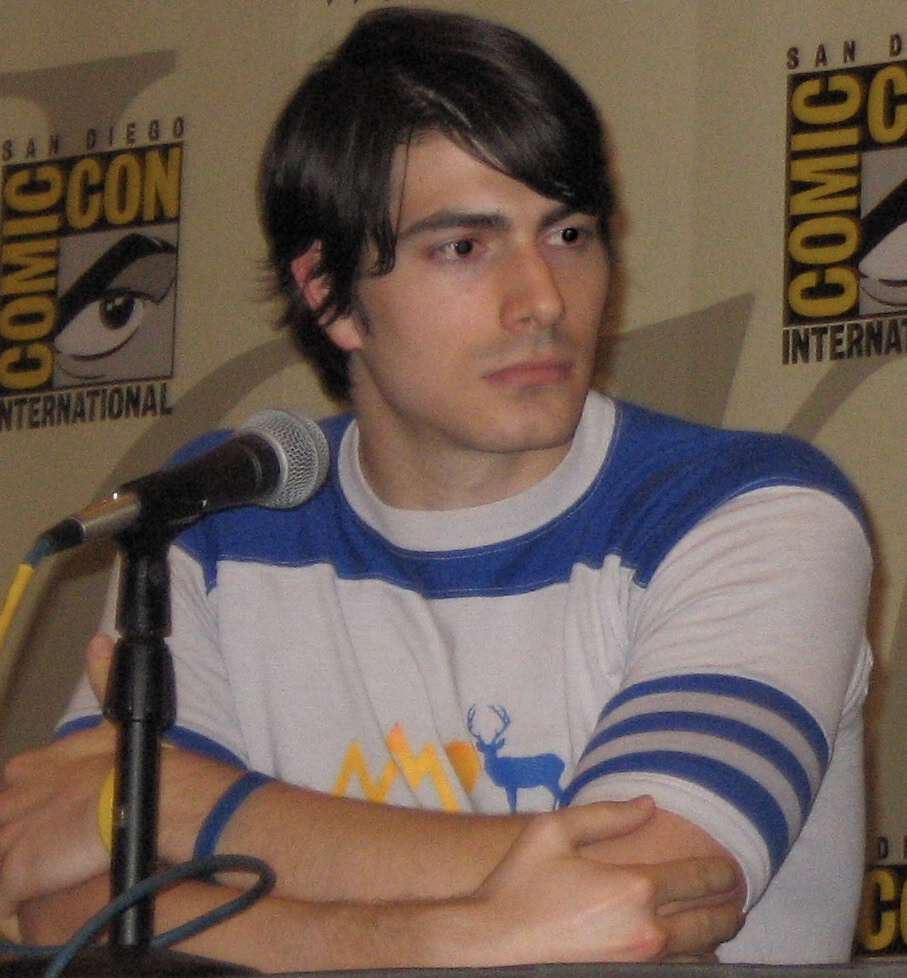
Brandon Routh in 2006

Following several unsuccessful attempts to reboot the franchise, Bryan Singer, who was said to be a childhood fan of Richard Donner's film, was approached by Warner Bros to direct a new Superman film. He accepted, abandoning two films already in pre-production, X-Men: The Last Stand (which, coincidentally, would come to be directed by Ratner) and a remake of Logan's Run. The film acts as a soft reboot of the franchise and uses the events of Superman and, to less of a degree, Superman II as a backstory, while directly not referencing the events of Superman III and Superman IV: The Quest for Peace. Singer's story tells of Superman's return to Earth following a five-year search for survivors of Krypton. He discovers that in his absence Lois Lane has given birth to a son and become engaged. Singer chose to follow Donner's lead by casting relatively unknown Brandon Routh as Superman, who resembled Christopher Reeve somewhat, and more high-profile actors in supporting roles, such as Kevin Spacey as Lex Luthor. Singer brought his entire crew from X2 to work on the film. Via digitally-enhanced archive footage, the late Marlon Brando appeared in the film as Jor-El. Superman Returns received generally positive reviews and grossed approximately $391 million worldwide.

=== Arrowverse ===
Routh later reprised his role as Superman in the 2019 Arrowverse crossover "Crisis on Infinite Earths". During the crossover, Superman references his son Jason.

=== Superman '78 ===
A comic continuation titled Superman '78 was submitted to DC Comics and was released in 2021. The run was inspired by DC's recent comic run Batman '66, which was a continuation of the 1966 television series and by Batman '89, a continuation of the Tim Burton continuity. The comic acts as a direct sequel to Superman II, taking place before Superman III and ignoring both Superman Returns and his Arrowverse portrayal.

== Timelines ==
=== Original continuity ===
==== Superman (1978) ====
On the distant planet Krypton, unable to convince Kryptonian elders, scientist Jor-El promises that neither he nor his wife, Lara, will leave the planet. However, he sends his infant son, Kal-El, to Earth to ensure his survival, just as Krypton begins its death throes. Kal-El's spaceship crash-lands in Smallville, Kansas three years later in 1951 (Lex Luthor later states the Krypton exploded in 1948). The boy is found and adopted by a childless couple, Jonathan and Martha Kent, who name him Clark Kent and find that he is no ordinary child, but incredibly agile and strong. He is told by his parents to keep his abilities hidden.

Shortly before Clark's eighteenth-birthday, Jonathan unexpectedly dies from a fatal heart attack. At his father's funeral, Clark conveys helplessness about having "all those powers and I couldn't even save him". Months later, Clark hears the call of a green crystal hidden in his parents' barn, and decides it is time to discover his purpose and departs on a journey to the Arctic and uses the crystal to build the Fortress of Solitude, a majestic crystal palace in the architectural style of his home planet, Krypton. Inside, he learns his true name, Kal-El, the reason he was transported to Earth, and his future role on the planet from holographic recordings of his father. After 12 years of education and training within the Fortress of Solitude, he emerges garbed in a red cape and blue body suit with the El family symbol on the chest and flies off.

Arriving in the city of Metropolis, Clark becomes a reporter for the Daily Planet newspaper. While there, he meets editor-in-chief, Perry White, teenage photographer Jimmy Olsen, and Lois Lane, who he becomes immediately infatuated with but is unable to properly gain her affection while in the bumbling guise of Clark Kent. It isn't long before Clark's true nature is unveiled when he publicly rescues Lois from a helicopter accident atop the Daily Planet building. Following a series of incidents in which Clark in his yet-unnamed guise comes to the rescue and saves the day, Perry issues his reporters to find out as much information as possible about this mysterious hero. Lois receives an invitation to meet someone at her place, signed only "a friend". Following a perfunctory interview with the Man of Steel, Lois joins him on a flight over Metropolis, ostensibly to see how fast he can go. After their romantic flight, the costumed hero flies off and Lois says to herself, "What a super man", then pauses, and says "Superman!," thus giving him his name.

Meanwhile, Lex Luthor plans to launch two missiles, one of which is programmed to hit the San Andreas Fault, causing most of California to slide into the ocean, killing millions of people while making the worthless desert land that he had purchased to skyrocket in value when it becomes the United States' new West Coast.

With Superman's fame rapidly spreading, Luthor perceives him to be a serious problem, luring to his lair with a phony threat to gas the population of Metropolis. Having succeeded in attracting his attention, he traps the superhero with a nodule of kryptonite — the only thing to which he is vulnerable. However, Superman escapes with the help of Luthor's assistant, Eve Teschmacher, who is frightened as her mother lives in Hackensack, New Jersey where the other missile is headed. Superman forces the Hackensack missile first into space, the California missile hits the San Andreas Fault, triggering the massive earthquake Luthor intended. Superman prevents the catastrophic landslide by plunging deep into the earth to shore up the fault line, but Lois, reporting in the area trapped inside her car is crushed to death. Disobeying his father, Superman travels back in time and prevents the Hoover Dam burst, fixing the fault line and preventing Lois' death. Superman bids farewell and delivers Luthor and Otis and delivering them to prison.

==== Superman II (1980) ====
Clark learns from Perry White that Lois is in Paris, France, where terrorists have seized the Eiffel Tower, threatening to level the city with a Hydrogen Bomb. Superman arrives and throws the elevator containing the bomb out of the atmosphere and into deep space, where it explodes, shattering the Phantom Zone mirror containing the Kryptonian criminals General Zod, Ursa (DC Comics) and Non. Clark and Lois are sent on assignment in Niagara Falls, Ontario. After Superman rescues a boy who falls over the railing, Lois starts noticing how Clark disappears every time Superman is around. Later in their hotel room, Clark's identity is revealed to Lois when he quickly retrieves his fallen glasses from the fireplace with his bare hands. Clark admits the truth and takes Lois to the Fortress of Solitude, where he tells Jor-El his desire to give up being Superman to live a normal life with Lois. Jor-El shows him a crystal chamber which will expose him to harnessed rays from Krypton's red sun, permanently removing his powers. After undergoing this de-powering process, Clark takes Lois to his bedchamber and they sleep together.

Meanwhile, the three Kryptonian criminals arrive on Earth and wreak havoc on a small town, easily defeating the U.S. military. After defacing Mount Rushmore, the trio conquer the White House, where Zod forces the President of the United States to kneel before him. Realizing his mistake, Clark returns to the Fortress, and uses the green crystal that called out to him at the start of his journey to reactivate the panel.

Lex Luthor arrives at the White House, informing Zod that Superman being Jor-El's son and manipulates them into luring Superman into a trap. They arrive at the Daily Planet offices and seize Lois, only to be interrupted by the arrival of a fully restored Superman. Following a destructive battle between the four Kryptonians, Superman flees, seemingly in defeat. Luthor convinces the villains to pursue Superman in his Fortress of Solitude, where they force Superman into the same depowering chamber he used before, but this time the red light is actually set loose on the Fortress removing the criminals' power while Superman is safe inside the chamber. Superman then crushes the now powerless Zod's hand and throws him down a crevice in the fortress Lois punches Ursa, Non leaps toward Superman, and they both fall through the fog of the fortress. Superman notifies the U.S. Arctic Patrol, who arrest the four criminals. Superman, realizes that life with Lois can never be, kisses Lois, erasing her memory of their romance.

==== Superman III (1983) ====
Clark returns to Smallville for a high school reunion where a romance blossomed between him and Lana Lang. During this time a computer genius named Gus Gorman befriends millionaire Ross Webster, who orders him to create synthetic Kryptonite, using a satellite to locate and analyze the wreckage of Krypton. He substitutes tobacco tar for an unknown element.

Lana convinces Superman to appear at Ricky's birthday party, which Smallville turns into a town celebration. Gus and Ross' sister Vera give Superman the flawed red Kryptonite. Superman is corrupted and commits acts of vandalism such as straightening the Leaning Tower of Pisa and blowing out the Olympic Flame.

Gus asks Webster to build a supercomputer in exchange for creating an energy crisis by directing every oil tanker to the Atlantic Ocean. When one tanker refuses, Lorelei seduce Superman, manipulating him to cause an oil spill. Lana's son Ricky pleads with Superman to become good again. Ricky's words cause him to split into two beings: the corrupted dark Superman and Clark Kent, who fight in a junkyard. Clark emerges victorious and becomes Superman again.

Superman arrives at the supercomputer in Glen Canyon. The supercomputer severely weakens Superman with a Kryptonite ray. Horrified, Gus destroys the Kryptonite ray. Superman uses beltric acid to destroy the supercomputer. Superman leaves Webster for the authorities and drops Gus off at a West Virginia coal mine, recommending him to the company as a computer programmer.

==== Supergirl (1984) ====
Though Clark doesn't appear, a photo of him does.

==== Superman IV: The Quest for Peace (1987) ====
Superman learns that the United States and the Soviet Union may soon engage in nuclear war, threatening the survival of the planet. Before taking action, he departs to the north pole to seek advice from the spirits of his Kryptonian ancestors at the Fortress of Solitude, who warn Kal-El that interring with human politics is forbidden. However, a letter from a young boy named Jeremy changes his mind and he tells the United Nations that he is going to rid the Earth of all nuclear weapons. Over the next several days, Superman takes all the nuclear weapons, and gathers them into a gigantic net in orbit above the planet. When he has almost all the weapons, he closes the net and tosses it into the Sun.

Meanwhile, Lex Luthor's nephew, Lenny, helps breaks his uncle out of prison and steal a strand of hair that Superman had donated to a museum. Luthor creates a genetic matrix from the strand of hair, and attaches it to the final American nuclear missile. After the missile is fired off into the air, Superman grabs the missile and throws it into the Sun. A few moments after the missile explodes on the Sun's surface, a ball of energy is discharged from the Sun, which rapidly develops into a "Nuclear Man". Nuclear Man finds his way to his "father", Luthor, who establishes that while he is indeed powerful, he will completely deactivate if isolated from the Sun's rays or suitably bright artificial light. A worldwide battle soon follows between Lex's creation and the Man of Steel. While successfully saving the Statue of Liberty, Superman is injured by Nuclear Man. The Daily Planet, to Lois' disgust, blares the headline that Superman is dead. Felled by radiation sickness, Clark staggers weakly to the terrace of his apartment, where he retrieves the last remaining crystal from Krypton, which he took from the barn in Smallville at the beginning of the film.

Nuclear Man develops a crush on Lacy Warfield, daughter of the tycoon who has purchased The Daily Planet, and threatens mayhem if he is not introduced to her. Superman agrees to take Nuclear Man to Lacy. In an attempt to disable the villain, Superman lures Nuclear Man into an elevator in the building, traps Nuclear Man in it, and pulls the elevator out of the building and flies to the Moon, heaving the elevator onto the ground there. Superman doesn't realize the doors have opened a crack. As the sun rises, Nuclear Man breaks out of his makeshift prison and the two resume battle on the Moon's surface. At the end of the battle, Superman is driven into the ground by his nuclear-charged opponent.

Nuclear Man returns to Earth, abducting Lacy and flying her into outer space (where she, strangely enough, is unaffected by the lack of breathable atmosphere and air pressure). Meanwhile, the Man of Steel pushes the Moon out of its normal orbit, casting Earth into a solar eclipse which shuts off Nuclear Man's powers. He then rescues Lacy from the arms of Nuclear Man, of whom he disposes by returning him to Earth and sealing him into the core of a nuclear power plant. Later, in a press conference, Superman declares only partial victory in his peace campaign, stating: "There will be peace when the people of the world want it so badly, that their governments will have no choice but to give it to them."

==== The Flash (2023) ====
As Barry Allen / The Flash and his younger self from 2013 engage Dark Flash inside the Chronobowl, the multiverse begins to implode with realities colliding with one another and collapsing. In a blue-colored world, Superman is seen landing on the roof of a Metropolis building and peers through an interdimensional hole in the sky. Supergirl joins him moments later, and the Kryptonian cousins watch helplessly as their reality collides with a green-colored reality housing an alternate version of Superman with longer hair. These events are immediately undone following the sacrifice of the younger Flash and subsequent erasure of the Dark Flash.

=== Superman '78 ===
After the events of Superman II, Clark Kent discusses his future as a reporter at the Daily Planet with his boss, Perry White, when Metropolis is suddenly attacked by a robot from outer space, which begins wreaking havoc on the streets while scanning the people and environment. Clark suits up as Superman and manages to destroy the robot, but not before it identifies him as a Kryptonian and informs its creator, Brainiac, an extraterrestrial cyborg from the planet Colu who is the last of his kind and obsessed with preserving life and cultures. Superman takes the head of the robot and gives it to Lex Luthor (who was recently released on parole) to analyze.

While discussing the robot with Lois Lane, Clark notices a large spaceship approaching the city. Brainiac arrives and demands Metropolis to hand Superman over to him, believing his presence is endangering Earth's ecosystem. Superman fends off the robots, but ultimately surrenders when Brainiac threatens to destroy the city. After taking him into his ship, Brainiac shrinks Clark and places him in the bottle city of Kandor, the last remains of Krypton that was preserved before the planet's destruction, where he discovers that a portion of Kryptonians survived, including his birth parents, Jor-El and Lara. Clark agrees to succeed his father as leader of Krypton's council affairs, but has a hard time adapting to the new environment.

On Earth, Lex brings Lois into his secret hideout and reveals he planted a receiver on Superman before Brainiac took him. He allows Lois to use his space transmitter to communicate with Superman, which Brainiac is quickly alerted to. Lex reveals his plan was for Brainiac to intercept the transmission so he could challenge the alien's intellect. However, it instead encourages Brainiac to excise Metropolis and shrink it to preserve it like he's done for the other civilizations, leading Lex to flee in a hot air balloon.

Jor-El finds the receiver on Superman's suit and realizes he can modify it to help Clark return to normal size and escape from the bottle. Despite Lara's protests, Clark agrees to the procedure so he can save Metropolis and Kandor. After returning to the ship and regaining his powers, Superman faces off against Brainiac and his legion of robots. He defeats the cyborg and retrieves all of the bottled civilizations before the core of the ship explodes, destroying Brainiac and his backup models. Metropolis begins plummeting back to the ground, but Superman helps the city land safely.

Clark begins working on follow-up stories of the incident with Lois at the Daily Planet. He briefly stops at the Fortress of Solitude to talk with his parents, vowing to find a way to free them and the rest of the civilizations Brainiac had in his possession.

=== Superman Returns ===
Superman Kal-El/Clark Kent
- Superman Returns and Arrowverse character
- Brandon Routh as Superman in the Arrowverse crossover "Crisis on Infinite Earths".
- First appearance: Superman Returns (2006)
- Last appearance: "Crisis on Infinite Earths: Part Five"; Legends of Tomorrow; January 14, 2020
- Based on: Superman by Jerry Siegel Joe Shuster; Superman by Mario Puzo David Newman Leslie Newman Robert Benton; Arrowverse: Superman (Kingdom Come) by Mark Waid Alex Ross
- Adapted by: Superman Returns: Bryan Singer; Michael Dougherty; Dan Harris; Arrowverse: Don Whitehead; Holly Henderson
- Portrayed by: Brandon Routh

In-universe information
- Aliases: Kal-El (birth name); Clark Kent (adoptive name)
- Species: Kryptonian
- Family: Jor-El (father); Lara (mother); Jonathan Kent (adoptive father); Martha Kent (adoptive mother)
- Significant other: Lois Lane
- Children: Jason White (son)
- Nationality: American
- Abilities: Invulnerability, superhuman strength, speed, sight, and hearing, frost breath, heat vision, X-ray vision, flight, amnesia-inducing touch

==== Superman Returns (2006) ====
According to dates on the Daily Planet newspapers, Superman Returns takes places in late September 2006. Five years earlier, Superman leaves Earth to try to find his former home world of Krypton after astronomers have supposedly found it, but finds nothing and returns home to Earth. During Superman's absence, Lois Lane becomes engaged to Perry White's nephew, Richard, and has a son named Jason. To make matters worse, Lex Luthor is at it again—after swindling an elderly, terminally ill woman.

Luthor vows vengeance against the Man of Steel and contrives a new sinister plot, using the crystals of Krypton to build a new continent which would submerge the United States underwater. Embedded in the continent's structure is Kryptonite—the lethal substance that is Superman's only weakness. Upon learning of Luthor's sinister scheme, Clark confronts Luthor, who stabs him with a Kryptonite shard, allowing Luthor and his goons to torture him before he plunges into the depths of the sea. He is saved when Lois Lane and Richard White arrive in a chopper, and the former pulls the Kryptonite shard out of him.

Clark thwarts Lex Luthor's plans, leaving him marooned on a deserted island before fainting and falling into a coma. Lois and Jason visit him at the hospital where Lois whispers that Jason is his son and then kisses him. Clark later awakens and visits Jason, reciting his father Jor-El's words to Jason as he sleeps. Lois starts writing another article, titled “Why the World Needs Superman”. Clark reassures her that he is now back to stay, and flies off to low orbit, where he gazes down at the world once again.

==== Arrowverse ====
Years after the events of Superman Returns, Clark now works at the Daily Planet as its editor-in-chief after Lois, Perry, Jimmy, and his other friends were killed, when a "reject from Gotham" gassed the Daily Planet. Since the incident, Clark has worn an outfit similar to the Kingdom Come version of Superman. Clark and Lois of Earth-38 meet him and asks for his help, realizing that he is the Paragon of Truth, but then their universe's Lex Luthor appears with the Book of Destiny and brainwashes the Earth-96 Clark to attack Clark. The two fight, but Lois knocks Lex out, stopping the brainwashed Clark. Afterwards, they go to the Waverider, where he meets all the other heroes including his Earth-1 dopplegänger, Ray Palmer/Atom. When Lyla Michaels / Harbinger appears, possessed by the Anti-Monitor, she attacks the heroes and lets the anti-matter wave consume Earth-1, the last one in the Multiverse. Nash Wells / Pariah teleports the Paragons, including Clark, to the Vanishing Point, a place outside time. After the heroes' arrival, Clark falls and disappears as Lex was able to use the Book of Destiny and substitute himself as the Paragon of Truth. After the end of the Crisis, Earth-96 is recreated and Clark can be seen, his crest again red and yellow, hinting that the Daily Planet gassing was reversed and that Lois, Perry, and Jimmy are alive.

== Reception ==
=== Christopher Reeve ===
The character and the portrayal by Christopher Reeve has garnered positive reviews from film critics and many other journalists. American Film Institute ranked Reeve's take on Superman in the first film as the 26th greatest hero of all time in their AFI's 100 Years...100 Heroes & Villains list. Business Insider placed Reeve's Superman as the fourth greatest superhero film performance out of twenty, while The Hollywood Reporter placed it at number three out of fifty top performances in a superhero film. In 2009, Entertainment Weekly placed Superman third on its list of the coolest heroes in pop culture. Mark Hughes of Forbes felt that Reeve portrays Superman and Clark Kent like two different people, and that it felt like watching two different actors on the screen. Ben Kuchera of Polygon opined that the "performance as both Clark Kent and Superman kept the characters distinct, and it was done through his body". Reeve's performance has also influenced the comics, as Gary Frank's Superman bears a resemblance to Reeve.

=== Brandon Routh ===
Routh's performance as Clark in Superman Returns received generally positive reviews, Joe Morgenstern from The Wall Street Journal felt Routh's portrayal of Superman was "somewhat dead or super average. Nothing special." Roger Ebert also felt that Routh lacked "charisma as Superman", and surmised that he was only cast because of his resemblance to Reeve.

Routh won the Saturn Award for Best Actor at the 33rd Saturn Awards for his portrayal of Superman.

== See also ==
- Superman curse
- Clark Kent (DC Extended Universe)
- Clark Kent (Superman & Lois)
- Clark Kent (Smallville)
