= Superman '78 =

DC Comics limited comic series

- Cover of Superman '78 #1 (August 2021)

Publication information
- Publisher: DC Comics
- Format: Limited series
- Publication date: August 2021 – April 2024
- No. of issues: 12
- Main character(s): Superman; Lois Lane; Lex Luthor; Brainiac; Metallo

Creative team
- Written by: Robert Venditti
- Penciller(s): Wilfredo Torres; Gavin Guidry

Collected editions
- Hardcover: ISBN 1779512651

Superman '78 is a superhero comic book limited series published by DC Comics. It is set in the continuity of Richard Donner's Superman film series which starred Christopher Reeve as the title character. Robert Venditti, who serves as the writer, revealed that he was working on a follow-up miniseries. It was launched in August 2021 and ran for six issues.

A second 6-issue limited series, Superman '78: The Metal Curtain, was announced by DC Comics on August 17, 2023. It began release in November 2023.

== Plot ==
=== Brainiac ===
As Clark Kent discusses his future as a reporter at the Daily Planet with his boss, Perry White, Metropolis is suddenly attacked by an alien robot who wreaks havoc on the streets while scanning the people and environment. Clark suits up as Superman and manages to destroy the robot, but not before it identifies him as a Kryptonian and informs its creator, Brainiac (modeled on musician and actor David Bowie), an extraterrestrial cyborg from the planet Colu who is the last of his kind and obsessed with preserving life and cultures. Superman takes the head of the robot and gives it to Lex Luthor (who was recently released on parole) to analyze.

While discussing the robot with Lois Lane, Clark notices a large spaceship approaching the city. Brainiac arrives and demands Metropolis to hand Superman over to him, believing his presence is endangering Earth's ecosystem. Superman fends off the robots, but ultimately surrenders when Brainiac threatens to destroy the city. After taking him into his ship, Brainiac shrinks Clark and places him in the bottle city of Kandor, the last remains of Krypton that was preserved before the planet's destruction. There, Clark discovers that a portion of Kryptonians survived, including his birth parents, Jor-El and Lara. Clark agrees to succeed his father as leader of Krypton's council affairs, but has a hard time adapting to the new environment.

On Earth, Lex brings Lois into his secret hideout and reveals he planted a receiver on Superman before Brainiac took him. He allows Lois to use his space transmitter to communicate with Superman, which Brainiac is quickly alerted to. Lex reveals his plan was for Brainiac to intercept the transmission so he could challenge the alien's intellect. However, it instead encourages Brainiac to excise Metropolis and shrink it to preserve it like he has done for the other civilizations, leading Lex to flee in a hot air balloon.

Jor-El finds the receiver on Superman's suit and realizes he can modify it to help Clark return to normal size and escape from the bottle. Despite Lara's protests, Clark agrees to the procedure so he can save Metropolis and Kandor. After returning to the ship and regaining his powers, Superman faces off against Brainiac and his legion of robots. He defeats the cyborg and retrieves all of the bottled civilizations before the core of the ship explodes, destroying Brainiac and his backup models. Metropolis begins plummeting back to the ground, but Superman helps the city land safely.

Clark begins working on follow-up stories of the incident with Lois at the Daily Planet. He briefly stops by the Fortress of Solitude to talk with his parents, vowing to find a way to free them and the rest of the civilizations Brainiac had in his possession.

=== The Metal Curtain ===
One night near the city's docks, Lois attempts to secretly record the U.S. Army's Colonel Evers engaging in an illegal arms sale. Evers captures her and destroys her recording before sending her in a boat to crash into a nearby barge, but Superman manages to save her in time and repair the ship. The next day, Perry refuses to run her story without other official sources. Unbeknownst to them, Evers is actually General Viktor Morosov of the Soviet Union.

In Moscow, Morosov meets up with Captain Maxim Nikolaev, a dedicated and well-regarded Soviet soldier. He reveals to the young captain that the Soviet Union came into possession of kryptonite in the early 1950s shortly after Krypton's destruction and have recently acquired an enhanced armor to harness its power. Believing that defeating Superman will demonstrate their might to the world, Morosov offers Nikolaev the chance to become the ultimate Soviet soldier that they will call "Metallo".

Superman flies Lois to the Fortress of Solitude for an interview and for the chance for her to meet his parents, still miniaturized in the city of Kandor. As Lois talks with Jor-El and Lara, Clark prepares to reveal his secret identity to her once more. Before he can do so, he hears an American spy plane getting attacked in the skies above the Bering Sea and leaves to rescue the pilot, codenamed Highball. After helping Highball to safety, Superman is attacked by Metallo, who uses his kryptonite armor to sap his strength and brutally beat him down before leaving him to die in the sea.

In Moscow, Morosov reprimands Metallo for attacking Superman and revealing their power to the American military too soon. Highball saves Superman from drowning before the two are picked up by Lois' father, the U.S. Navy's General Sam Lane. Learning of the threat the Soviets pose with Metallo, Lane encourages Superman to stay out of the conflict as the Man of Steel returns to the Fortress to bring Lois back to Metropolis. Perry assigns Lois to cover Metallo's attack on the spy plane after she claims she has Superman as a source, but secretly contacts her father before publishing the story. Lex reads the story the next day and decides to investigate further.

Metallo attacks Washington, D.C. to challenge Superman to a rematch for the world to see. With help from the military, Superman is able to hold his own, but still struggles against Metallo's kryptonite. Suddenly, he is contacted by Lex via radio frequency. Lex reveals that he created Metallo's armor and guides Superman to activate an emergency fail-safe to shut down the power. With thirty seconds before the armor powers down completely, Metallo quickly flees the scene.

Superman, Lois, and General Lane meet Lex in the California Desert, where he confirms he was the one who sold the armor to Colonel Evers that night on the docks, not knowing Evers was secretly Morosov. He also reveals the armor has no weaknesses besides the fail-safe (which the Soviets have removed after Metallo's last fight with Superman). Despite the risks, Superman decides to confront Metallo in Moscow to avoid endangering more innocent lives.

Upon his arrival, the citizens flee in terror due to the Russian military's propaganda against him. Morosov believes they can use this opportunity to sacrifice soldiers against him to push their narrative further, but Nikolaev, now more prone to anger due to the kryptonite's effects on his body, disobeys his orders and dons the Metallo armor. Superman's attempts to negotiate with Metallo initially fall on deaf ears, and the Russian soldier puts multiple bystanders in danger in his attempt to eliminate him. As the Man of Steel goes out of his way to save the citizens during the fight, the people begin to realize the propaganda against him is wrong and help Superman convince Metallo to stand down.

Morosov arrives with the military and threatens to replace Nikolaev as Metallo if he doesn't kill Superman, but Nikolaev vows not to let the kryptonite suit harm anyone again and sacrifices himself by flying into space and detonating the suit. Though Morosov is determined not to let anyone remember Nikolaev as a hero, Superman reminds him that the Moscow citizens who witnessed his death will threaten to take action if he attempts to stop them. With the Moscow news not reporting the fight, Superman arrives at the Daily Planet to confirm his survival.

== Publications ==
Superman '78 was published by DC Comics beginning on August 24, 2021. Superman '78: The Metal Curtain was published by DC Comics beginning on November 28, 2023.

=== Issues ===
Title	Issue	Title	Publication date	Ref.
Superman '78	#1	"Brainiac, Chapter One"	August 24, 2021	
Superman '78	#2	"Brainiac, Chapter Two"	September 28, 2021	
Superman '78	#3	"Brainiac, Chapter Three"	November 2, 2021	
Superman '78	#4	"Brainiac, Chapter Four"	November 23, 2021	
Superman '78	#5	"Brainiac, Chapter Five"	December 28, 2021	
Superman '78	#6	"Brainiac, Conclusion"	January 25, 2022	

Title	Issue	Title	Publication date	Ref.
Superman '78: The Metal Curtain	#1	"The Metal Curtain, Chapter One"	November 28, 2023	
Superman '78: The Metal Curtain	#2	"The Metal Curtain, Chapter Two"	December 5, 2023	
Superman '78: The Metal Curtain	#3	"The Metal Curtain, Chapter Three"	January 2, 2024	
Superman '78: The Metal Curtain	#4	"The Metal Curtain, Chapter Four"	February 6, 2024	
Superman '78: The Metal Curtain	#5	"The Metal Curtain, Chapter Five"	March 5, 2024	
Superman '78: The Metal Curtain	#6	"The Metal Curtain, Conclusion"	April 2, 2024	

=== Collected editions ===
- Superman '78 HC (ISBN 1779512651/978-1-77951-265-9/EAN-5 52499, 2022-06-10/2022-07-19 (Note: June date is as listed in book's first printing.))

== Reception ==
Superman '78 received critical acclaim by critics scoring an average rating of 8.8 for the entire series based on 52 critic reviews aggregated by ComicBookRoundup.com.

== See also ==
- Batman '66
- Wonder Woman '77
- Batman '89
