= Screen test =

Method of finding an actor for a role

A screen test is a method of determining the suitability of an actor or actress for performing on film or in a particular role. It is typically a secondary or later stage in the audition process. The performer is generally given a scene, or selected lines and actions, and instructed to perform in front of a camera to see if they are suitable. The developed film is later evaluated by the relevant production personnel such as the casting director and the director. The actor may be asked to bring a prepared monologue or alternatively, the actor may be given a script to read at sight ("cold reading"). In some cases, the actor may be asked to read a scene, in which another performer reads the lines of another character.

A screen test can also be used to determine the chemistry between two potential actors or actresses, to see if they work well together or not. They may be told to read out their characters' lines from a scene, and perform them together.

== Types ==
Screen tests can also be used to judge the suitability of costume, make-up and other details, but these are generally called costume or make-up tests. Different types of actors can have different tasks for each individual test. For example, a lead for a musical theater-type movie could be requested to sing a popular song or learn a dance routine. Screen tests are routinely used in films and commercials. They are also used for short films.

International actors such as Bruce Lee were given screen tests to demonstrate that they are sufficiently articulate in the relevant language. In Lee's case, for the role of Kato in The Green Hornet, he was asked to converse about Chinese culture in English to judge his grasp of the language, then to demonstrate some martial arts moves to show off his physical skills.

== See also ==
- Audition
