= The Flash (film) =

2023 superhero film by Andy Muschietti

- Theatrical release poster
- Directed by: Andy Muschietti
- Screenplay by: Christina Hodson
- Story by: John Francis Daley; Jonathan Goldstein; Joby Harold
- Based on: Characters from DC
- Produced by: Barbara Muschietti; Michael Disco
- Starring: Ezra Miller; Sasha Calle; Michael Shannon; Ron Livingston; Maribel Verdú; Kiersey Clemons; Antje Traue; Michael Keaton
- Cinematography: Henry Braham
- Edited by: Jason Ballantine; Paul Machliss
- Music by: Benjamin Wallfisch
- Production companies: Warner Bros. Pictures; DC Films; Double Dream; The Disco Factory
- Distributed by: Warner Bros. Pictures
- Release dates: June 12, 2023 (Grauman's Chinese Theatre); June 16, 2023 (United States)
- Running time: 144 minutes
- Country: United States
- Language: English
- Budget: $200–220 million
- Box office: $271.4 million

The Flash is a 2023 American superhero film based on the DC Comics character Barry Allen / The Flash. Directed by Andy Muschietti from a screenplay by Christina Hodson and a story by the duo of John Francis Daley and Jonathan Goldstein as well as Joby Harold, it is the 13th film in the DC Extended Universe (DCEU). Ezra Miller stars as Barry Allen, who travels back in time to prevent his mother's death and becomes stranded in an alternate past. Sasha Calle also stars in her film debut, alongside Michael Shannon, Ron Livingston, Maribel Verdú, Kiersey Clemons, Antje Traue, and Michael Keaton. Barbara Muschietti and Michael Disco produced the film for DC Films and Warner Bros. Pictures.

Development on a film featuring the Flash began in the late 1980s, with various iterations planned until it was redeveloped for the DCEU in 2014, when Miller was cast. Multiple writers and directors were attached over the following years, with Seth Grahame-Smith, Rick Famuyiwa, Daley, and Goldstein all departing the project over creative differences with the studios. Muschietti and Hodson became involved in July 2019, and pre-production began in January 2020. Influenced by the 2011 comic book storyline Flashpoint, the film explores the multiverse and features other DC characters, such as Calle's Supergirl and multiple versions of Batman, particularly Keaton's portrayal from the films Batman (1989) and Batman Returns (1992), while others were digitally included. Filming lasted from April to October 2021 at Warner Bros. Studios Leavesden and on location throughout the United Kingdom. The film's ending was altered several times during post-production due to changes in DC's wider plans under different studio leadership.

The Flash premiered at Grauman's Chinese Theatre in Hollywood, Los Angeles, on June 12, 2023, and was released in the United States on June 16, following multiple delays caused by the director changes and the COVID-19 pandemic. The film received mixed reviews from critics, who praised its humor, action sequences, and performances, but criticized the visual effects and third act. It was also a box-office bomb, grossing $271.4 million worldwide against a budget of $200–220 million. Its box office performance was attributed to factors such as Miller's legal issues and controversies, the DCEU's imminent reboot with the DC Universe (DCU), superhero fatigue, and the film's mixed reception and marketing practices.

== Plot ==
After helping Bruce Wayne / Batman and Diana Prince / Wonder Woman stop a robbery in Gotham City, Barry Allen / The Flash revisits his childhood home, where he lived with his parents Nora and Henry, before the latter's wrongful imprisonment for the former's murder. (Note: As depicted in Justice League (2017) and Zack Snyder's Justice League (2021)) On the day of her death, Nora sent Henry to pick up groceries she forgot to buy, leaving her alone in the kitchen where she was killed by an unidentified assailant. (Note: Identified off-screen as Eobard Thawne / Reverse-Flash by director Andy Muschietti) Overcome by emotions, Barry accidentally uses the Speed Force to travel back in time to earlier that day. Returning to the present, he discusses the incident with Bruce, who warns of the unintended consequences of time travel. Despite this, Barry travels to the day of Nora's death and places the missing groceries in Nora's cart to prevent Henry from leaving the house. As he returns to the present, Barry is attacked by an unknown speedster and emerges in an alternate 2013 where Nora is alive. He encounters his parents and his past self, and realizes this is the day he was struck by lightning and obtained his powers.

The two Barrys go to the Central City Police Department, where Barry reenacts the event so 2013-Barry can gain his powers. Both are struck by lightning, granting 2013-Barry powers but leaving Barry without his own. As Barry struggles to train his younger self on properly using his powers, the Barrys learn that General Zod is preparing to invade Earth. (Note: As depicted in Man of Steel (2013)) To fight Zod, the Barrys attempt to assemble the Justice League but are unsuccessful; in this timeline, Diana cannot be located, Victor Stone has not gained his abilities yet, and Arthur Curry never existed. They travel to Wayne Manor, hoping to find Bruce, but they instead find an alternate version who has long retired. Bruce theorizes that altering history through time travel affects events both before and after the alteration, causing several realities to collapse into a single one. They convince Bruce to return as Batman and help them find Kal-El / Superman.

The Barrys and Bruce locate a Kryptonian pod discovered in Siberia. Upon arrival, they instead find Kal-El's cousin, Kara Zor-El, imprisoned in the facility. They rescue Kara and return to Wayne Manor, where Barry enlists Bruce's help to regain his powers. The first two attempts fail, prompting Kara to fly Barry into a storm, where he regains his powers. Kara, Bruce, and the Barrys fight Zod and his forces. Kara learns that Zod intercepted Kal-El's escape pod from Krypton and, in an attempt to extract the Codex needed to repopulate the Kryptonian species, killed him. Zod reveals that the Codex is actually within Kara before subduing and killing her, extracting the Codex from her blood. Meanwhile, Bruce sacrifices himself in an unsuccessful attempt to destroy Zod's ship. The Barrys repeatedly time-travel to save Bruce and Kara, but keep failing. Barry realizes the sequence of events cannot be changed, but 2013-Barry keeps trying, which causes the multiverse to begin imploding.

The unknown speedster who initially knocked Barry out of the Speed Force returns and is revealed to be an older, future version of 2013-Barry who still believes he can defeat Zod and save his Earth. Barry decides to reverse the changes he made to the timeline by letting Nora die. The elder 2013-Barry attempts to kill Barry to stop him, but young 2013-Barry sacrifices himself and is impaled instead, causing the elder 2013-Barry to fade from existence. Barry reverts the timeline and comes to terms with his mother's death; however, he subtly alters the past by moving the groceries to a higher shelf. Returning to the present day, Barry attends Henry's court hearing, where the security footage now reveals Henry's previously obscured face at the grocery store, verifying his alibi and allowing his exoneration. Barry is then contacted by Bruce, whose appearance has changed once again due to the timeline alteration.

== Cast ==
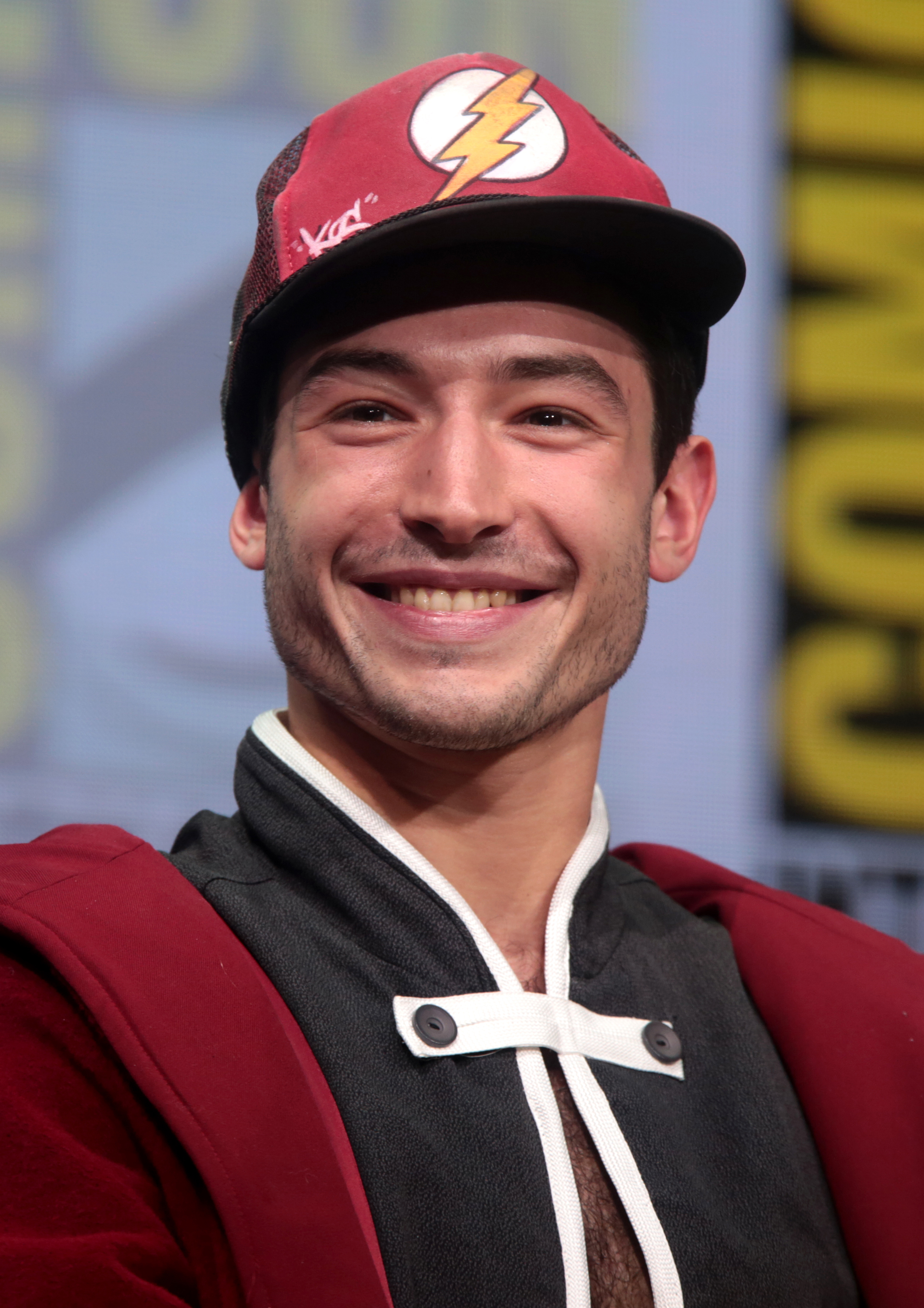
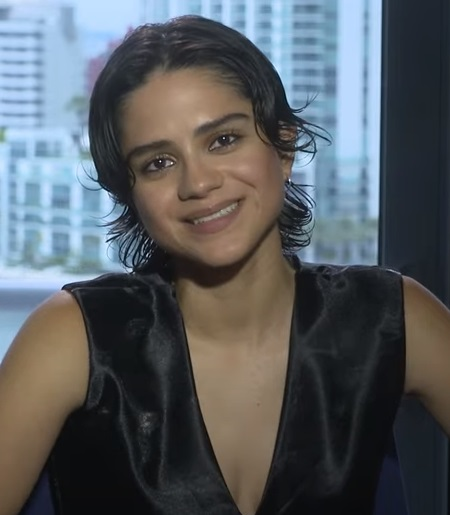
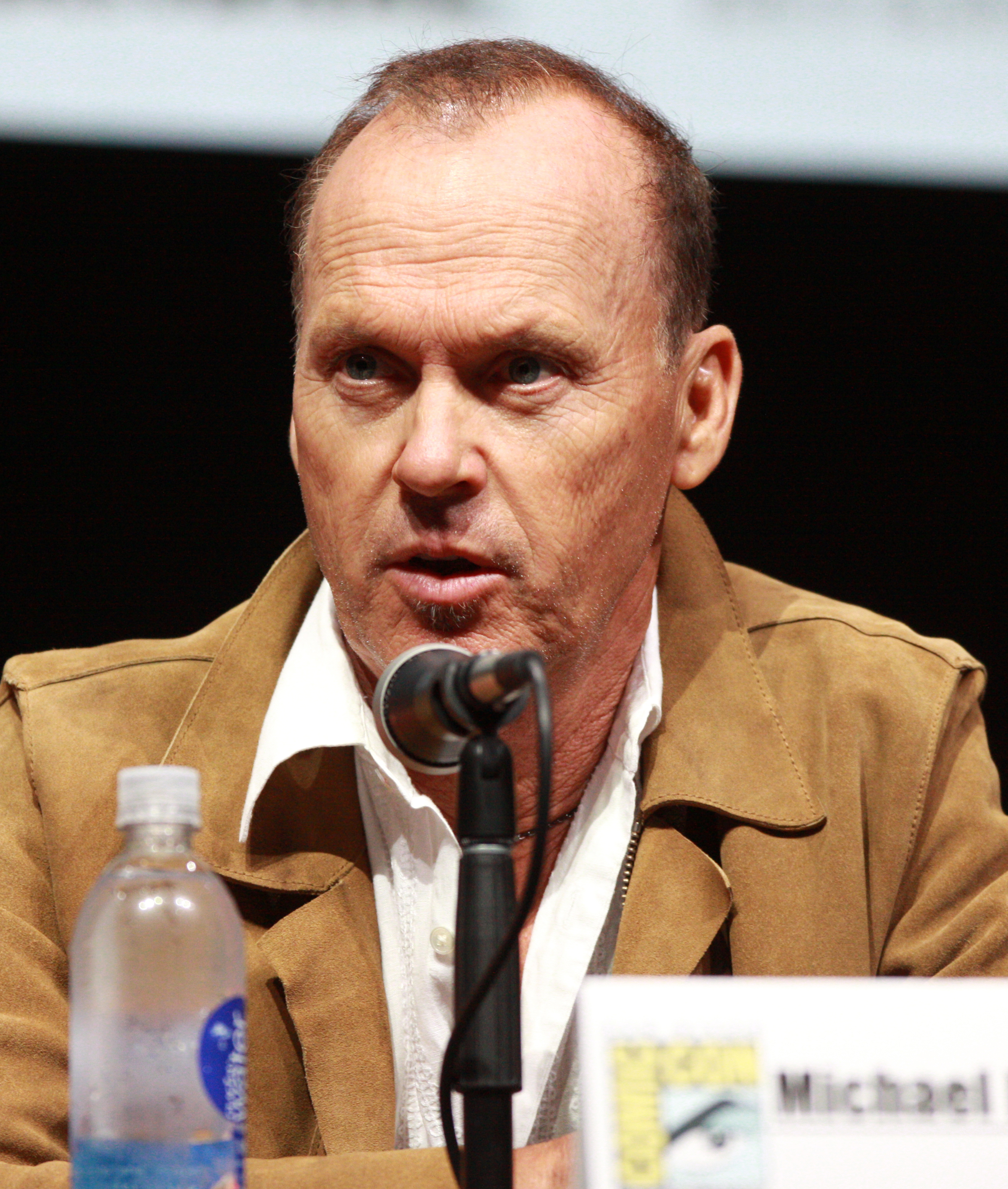
The film stars Ezra Miller as the Flash, Sasha Calle as Supergirl, and Michael Keaton as Batman.
- Ezra Miller as Barry Allen / The Flash:
  A police forensic investigator from Central City and member of the Justice League who can move at superhuman speeds using the Speed Force. Miller described Barry as multi-dimensional, with human flaws. Miller also portrays an alternate younger version of Barry from 2013, with producer Barbara Muschietti describing the pair as a "delicious odd couple", and a corrupted older version of 2013-Barry known as the Dark Flash who became obsessed with reversing time and is caught in a time loop. Ian Loh portrays a young Barry in flashbacks, and Miller's acting double, Ed Wade, physically portrays both versions of Barry in scenes where the two characters are interacting when Miller is playing a particular version.
- Sasha Calle as Kara Zor-El / Supergirl:
  A powerful Kryptonian from an alternative universe who possesses powers, abilities, and a costume similar to her cousin, Kal-El / Superman. Calle is the first Latina actress to portray Supergirl, and had signed a multi-film contract for the DCEU.
- Michael Shannon as General Zod:
  A Kryptonian general who possesses the same powers as Superman and was killed by him in Man of Steel (2013). This version hails from an alternate timeline where Kara landed on Earth instead of Kal-El. Shannon received Man of Steel director Zack Snyder's blessing to reprise his role, after initially being hesitant to do so given the troubled history between Snyder and Warner Bros. regarding his later DCEU productions.
- Ron Livingston as Henry Allen:
  Barry's father who was wrongfully convicted of his wife's murder. Livingston replaces Billy Crudup, who portrayed the character in Justice League (2017) and its director's cut, Zack Snyder's Justice League (2021).
- Maribel Verdú as Nora Allen: Barry's mother who was killed in his youth
- Kiersey Clemons as Iris West: A journalist for the Picture News and love interest for Barry
- Antje Traue as Faora-Ul: A Kryptonian and General Zod's second-in-command also from an alternate timeline who was sent to the Phantom Zone at the end of Man of Steel
- Michael Keaton as Bruce Wayne / Batman:
  A wealthy socialite from Gotham City who moonlights as a crimefighting vigilante. Keaton reprises the role from the films Batman (1989) and Batman Returns (1992), although this time as an alternate version of the character from 2013-Barry's timeline. Ben Affleck reprises his DCEU role as the original Bruce Wayne / Batman, the leader of the Justice League from Barry's timeline. Director Andy Muschietti said the character has a substantial emotional impact on the film through his relationship with Barry, in part because both their mothers were killed. Affleck appears, uncredited, for five minutes in the film. He felt his scenes were the first time he "really understood" and figured out how to play the character, calling them his favorite and a "nice finish" to his role. George Clooney also makes an uncredited cameo appearance as an alternate version of Wayne who replaces the DCEU iteration in Barry's timeline in the film's ending. Clooney reprises the role from Batman & Robin (1997).

Additional actors who reprise their roles from the DCEU are Jeremy Irons as Wayne's butler Alfred Pennyworth; Gal Gadot and Jason Momoa, in uncredited appearances, as the Justice League members Diana Prince / Wonder Woman and Arthur Curry / Aquaman; and Temuera Morrison as an alternate version of Arthur's father Thomas Curry from 2013-Barry's timeline. Saoirse-Monica Jackson and Rudy Mancuso also appear as Barry's co-workers Patty Spivot and Albert Desmond alongside Sanjeev Bhaskar as Barry's boss David Singh, while Luke Brandon Field portrays Al Falcone, the leader of a terrorist crew who robs Gotham General Hospital in the beginning of the film. Other appearances include Karl Collins as Henry Allen's lawyer, Kieran Hodgson as a sandwich shop employee, and Sean Rogers as 2013-Barry's roommate Gary, while Nikolaj Coster-Waldau and Muschietti cameo as a pedestrian and a reporter who both get their food stolen by different versions of Barry.

Adaptations of several DC characters make cameo appearances in the film. Through computer-generated imagery (CGI), Henry Cavill appears as the DCEU version of Superman during a multiversal sequence in the Speed Force. His character also appears earlier in the film during a television news report about a volcanic eruption in Guatemala, although his face is obscured. Cavill had filmed additional scenes as his character for the film's original ending, but they were removed during post-production. Also through CGI, Jai Courtney appears in his DCEU role of the Flash enemy George "Digger" Harkness / Captain Boomerang, while the film's co-editor, Jason Ballantine, appears as the Jay Garrick incarnation of the Flash. Nicolas Cage also portrays an alternate version of Superman fighting a giant spider, referencing his intended role in director Tim Burton's unproduced film Superman Lives. Cage filmed his scenes through volumetric capture and was digitally de-aged for the role. He had previously voiced Superman in the animated film Teen Titans Go! To the Movies (2018).

The multiverse sequence also features past portrayals of Superman, Batman, and Supergirl, recreated through a combination of artificial intelligence, deepfake technology, and archival footage. These include George Reeves as his version of Superman from Superman and the Mole Men (1951) and Adventures of Superman (1952–1958), Christopher Reeve as Superman from the 1978–1987 Superman films, Helen Slater as Supergirl from Supergirl (1984), and Adam West and Burt Ward as Batman and Dick Grayson / Robin from the 1966 Batman film and the 1966–1968 television series. Archival audio and footage also feature Cesar Romero and Jack Nicholson as their respective versions of the Joker from the 1960s Batman series and the 1989 film, along with Eartha Kitt as Catwoman from the 1960s series.

== Production ==
=== Development ===
==== Early attempts ====
Development on a film based on the DC Comics character the Flash began in the late 1980s when Warner Bros. Pictures hired television writer Jeph Loeb to write a screenplay, before DC Comics president Jenette Kahn hired him to instead write a revival of the comic book Challengers of the Unknown (1991). After impressing Warner Bros. with his script for the DC Comics–based film Batman Begins (2005), the studio offered David S. Goyer the choice to work on a film featuring either the Flash or Green Lantern, but it was also primarily interested in one for Wonder Woman. Goyer chose the Flash due to the cinematic possibilities of the character and his abilities, and he was hired to write, direct, and produce a new version of The Flash in December 2004, as part of an overall production deal with the studio. Warner Bros. executive vice president (EVP) of production Lynn Harris was set to oversee the film's development after working with Goyer on the Marvel Comics–based film Blade: Trinity (2004) at Warner Bros.'s New Line Cinema. Goyer approached his Blade: Trinity co-star Ryan Reynolds to portray the Wally West version of the Flash and intended to have the character Barry Allen appear in a supporting role. For the film's tone, Goyer was influenced by director Sam Raimi's Spider-Man film trilogy (2002–2007) and Mike Baron, Mark Waid, and Geoff Johns's 1987–2006 The Flash comic book runs. Goyer was also inspired by the Greek myth of Icarus for handling Wally West's use of super speed and the character being a "screw up". He contrasted the Flash with Batman, noting that he is not a vigilante, does not have a secret identity, and enjoys being a superhero. Reynolds met with Goyer to discuss the role in March 2005, when Goyer was writing the script, which was described as having dark themes. Reynolds said he would portray the Flash if Warner Bros. greenlit the film.

"I was involved at one point with The Flash. And Warner Bros. came to me and said, 'The work that you've been doing hasn't yet resulted in something that any of us, including the filmmaking team, feel could be greenlit as a movie. We're trying to accomplish something that takes into account the entire, rich DC character world, and we'd like to pull it back. [...] We just want to take a different kind of approach. Do you mind if we try that?' If we had something that was really working […] But we didn't. The David Goyer screenplay, that didn't work. Goyer left the project. We then embarked with David Dobkin, trying to come up with another approach. We hadn't even hired a writer at that point. So for us, we completely understood."

— Producer Charles Roven on why earlier iterations of The Flash did not move forward

In June 2005, Goyer said The Flash would be his next film after Batman Begins, confirmed that Barry Allen and Wally West were both featured, and revealed that an MIT personnel consulted on the film's approach to the character's more cosmic aspects, such as depicting the Speed Force through the relativistic Doppler effect. A year later, Goyer planned to direct The Flash as his follow-up to The Invisible (2007), and completed the first draft by early October. He quietly left in the following months over creative differences with the studio and announced his exit in early February 2007, when Shawn Levy was hired to direct. He intended to direct the planned film The Hardy Men before The Flash. For approximately three-and-a-half months, he oversaw the writing of a new draft by Chris Brancato, which used elements from Goyer's script. Charles Roven and Alex Gartner joined as producers, with Levy also expected to produce in some capacity. Unlike his prior works, Levy did not intend for the film to be a comedy; instead, he wanted it to have a lighter tone than some previous DC films. Later that month, Warner Bros. announced the development of a Justice League film, with Michelle and Kieran Mulroney writing the screenplay. In August, Reynolds reaffirmed that The Flash was in development alongside the Justice League film, and Brancato had completed a draft by early September. George Miller signed on to direct the Justice League film, titled Justice League: Mortal, later that month. It was envisioned as the start of a franchise with planned sequels and spin-offs, including the Flash film.

Levy felt they "never got the Flash script right", and he left in October 2007 due to scheduling conflicts with Night at the Museum: Battle of the Smithsonian (2009). David Dobkin took over as director and began developing the film as a spin-off from Justice League: Mortal, with a focus on Wally West, but it was soon reported not to be connected to that film. On his approach to the film, Dobkin said it was about how "[y]ou can't outrun yourself". Craig Wright was writing a script for the film early the next month, days before the start of the 2007–08 Writers Guild of America strike, which delayed further development on the film. In December 2007, Adam Brody was cast as the Wally West version of the Flash for Justice League: Mortal. In January 2008, Roven said that work on the script for The Flash had already begun with Dobkin's take and would resume following the strike, but later said there was no script or writer. Justice League: Mortal was also paused by the strike and later canceled.

The Flash was in active development by August 2008. Johns was quietly hired to consult on the film around this time, as part of a strategic shift by Warner Bros. Pictures Group president Jeff Robinov to centralize control of Warner Bros.'s DC Comics adaptations within the studio rather than optioning them to individual producers, such as Roven on The Flash. By July 2009, Johns wrote a film treatment that used elements of Brancato's draft, which Dan Mazeau adapted into a screenplay. Johns was producing the film alongside Roven, but no director was attached at that point. In September, Robinov restructured DC Comics under DC Entertainment, a newly formed division of Warner Bros. led by Diane Nelson, as part of his strategy to reclaim oversight and ownership of their adaptations. As such, Roven was pulled from The Flash, although there was potential for him and other producers to return to DC projects with adjusted deals. In October, Roven confirmed he was no longer involved in the film and said the studio was not confident enough in their take to greenlight the film, although Mazeau disputed this and said the film was moving forward as planned. In June 2010, Greg Berlanti, Michael Green, and Marc Guggenheim—the writers of the film Green Lantern (2011) starring Reynolds—were hired to write a new treatment for The Flash based on a recent comics run by Johns that featured Barry Allen. The pair had started work by August and completed a draft by the middle of February 2011, before Green Lantern was a critical and commercial failure upon its release in June 2011.

==== DC Extended Universe ====
Warner Bros. was planning a new shared universe of films based on DC characters by July 2013 and had tentative plans to release a Flash film in 2016. Berlanti was still involved in developing the film while also co-developing a television series for the CW about the character, The Flash (2014–2023), which is set in its DC-based shared universe, the Arrowverse. These adaptations were not expected to conflict with each other. In October 2014, Warner Bros. and DC Entertainment announced a slate of planned projects as part of their new franchise, the DC Extended Universe (DCEU). The Flash was set for release on March 23, 2018, with Ezra Miller attached to star in the film as Barry Allen / The Flash; Miller first made cameo appearances in Batman v Superman: Dawn of Justice (2016) and Suicide Squad (2016), and starred in the team-up film Justice League (2017). Warner Bros. offered James Wan the choice of directing a film about either Aquaman or the Flash, and he ultimately chose to make Aquaman (2018).

By April 2015, Phil Lord and Christopher Miller were writing a story treatment for the Flash film with the possibility of directing it. After they decided to direct Solo: A Star Wars Story (2018) instead, The Lego Batman Movie (2017) co-writer Seth Grahame-Smith entered negotiations to write and direct the film based on Lord and Miller's treatment in October 2015. Grahame-Smith was set to make his directorial debut with the film, with Roven once again producing and Deborah and Zack Snyder executive producing. Jay Oliva, a storyboard artist on several DCEU films and the CW's series as well as the director of the animated film Justice League: The Flashpoint Paradox (2013), worked with Grahame-Smith on a storyboard and test which he said prompted the studio to greenlight the film. In February 2016, the film's release date was moved forward to March 16, 2018. Grahame-Smith left the project that April, citing creative differences. Warner Bros. chose to retain his script, and still expected him to remain involved, while Lord and Miller remained producers. The studio began immediately searching for a replacement director, wanting to hire one more experienced. Screen tests had taken place for several weeks by then between Miller and multiple actresses for the female lead. After the divisive reception to Batman v Superman, Warner Bros. Pictures sought to stabilize the direction of the DCEU. In May 2016, the studio reorganized to have genre-responsible film executives, with the studio's DC Entertainment films placed under a new division, DC Films, to be led by Johns—who had since become DC Comics's chief creative officer—and Warner Bros. EVP Jon Berg. The division was formed to compete more directly with Marvel Studios and its franchise, the Marvel Cinematic Universe (MCU), but it was not designed to override the franchise's "director-driven" mandate.

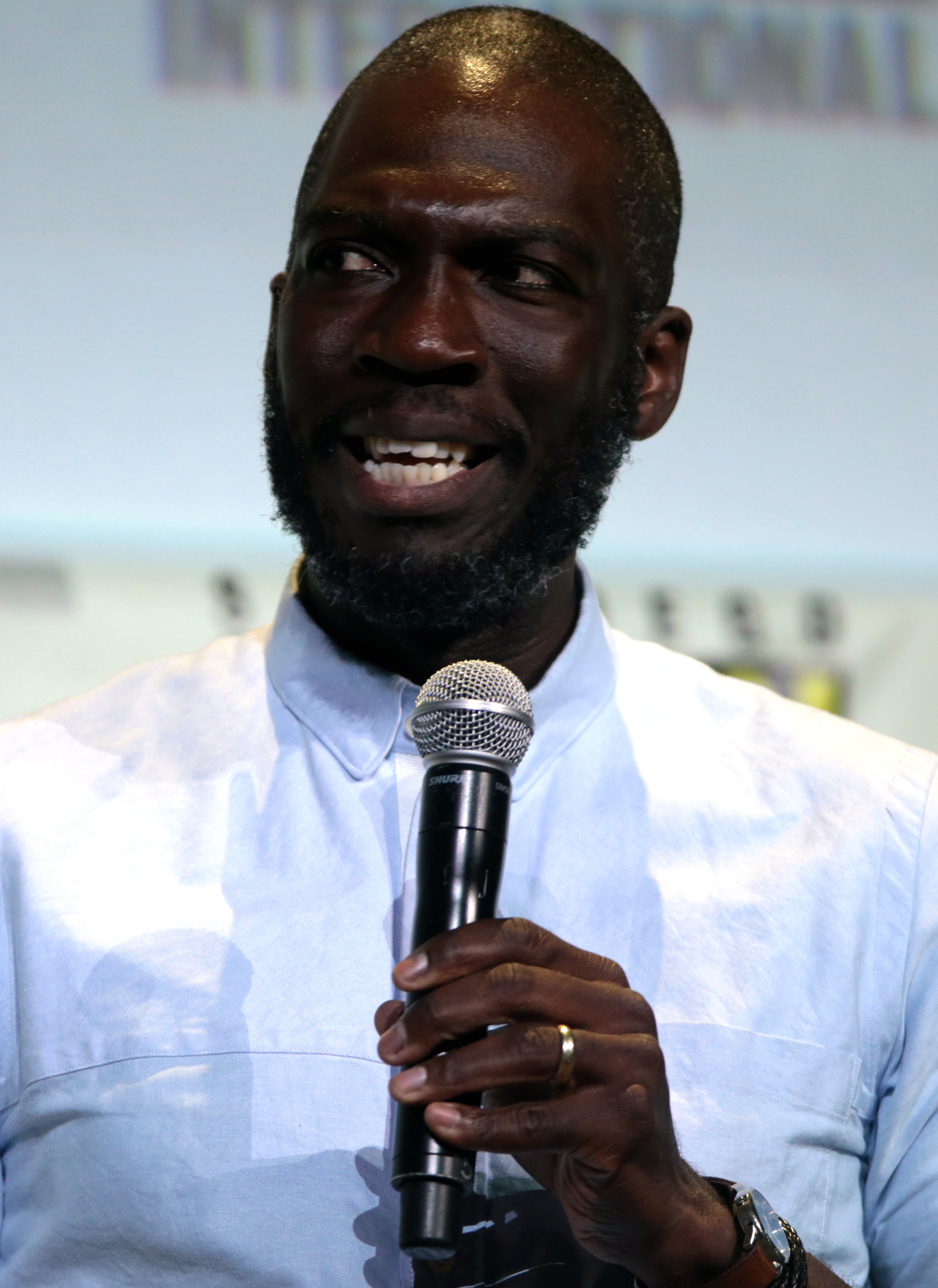
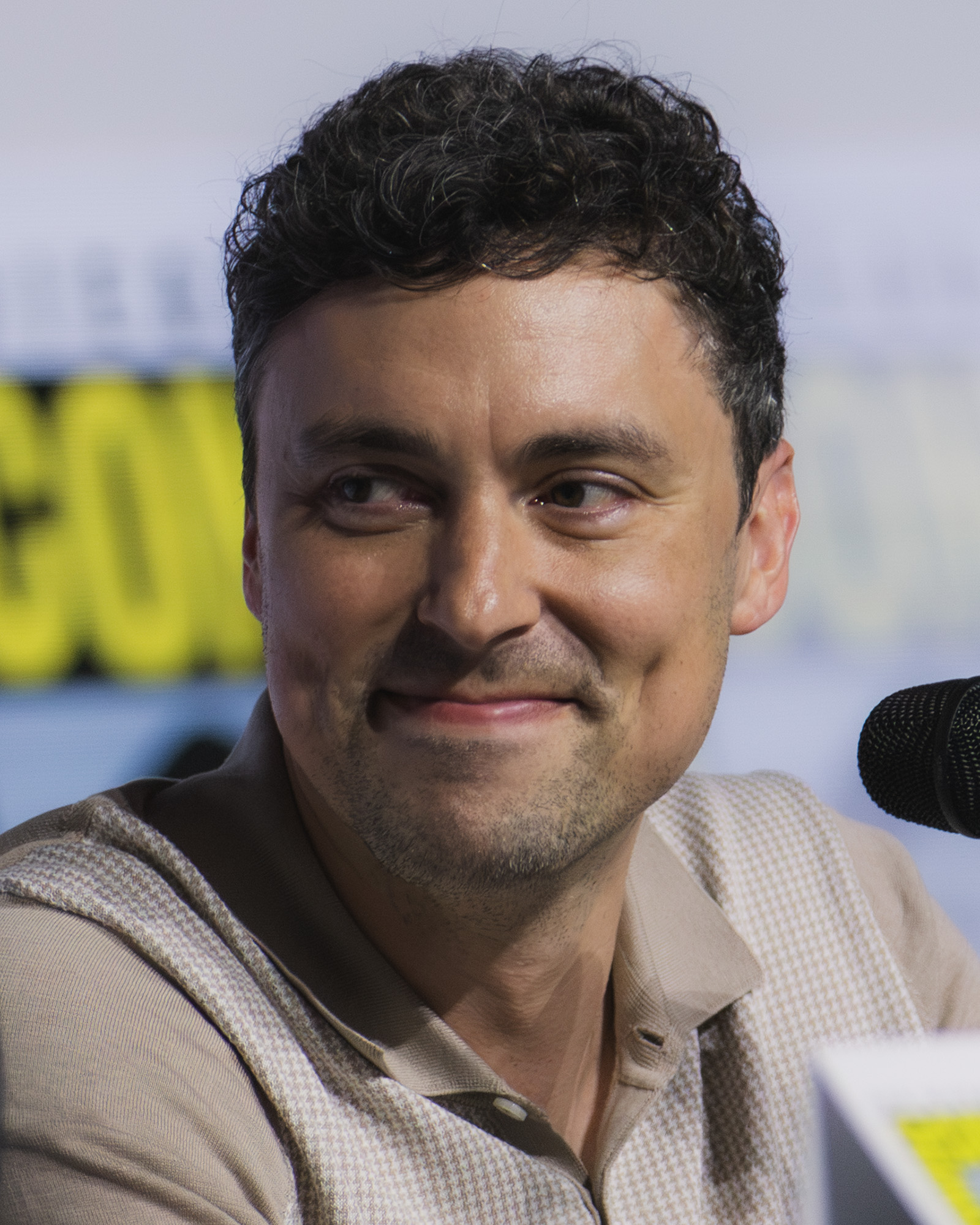
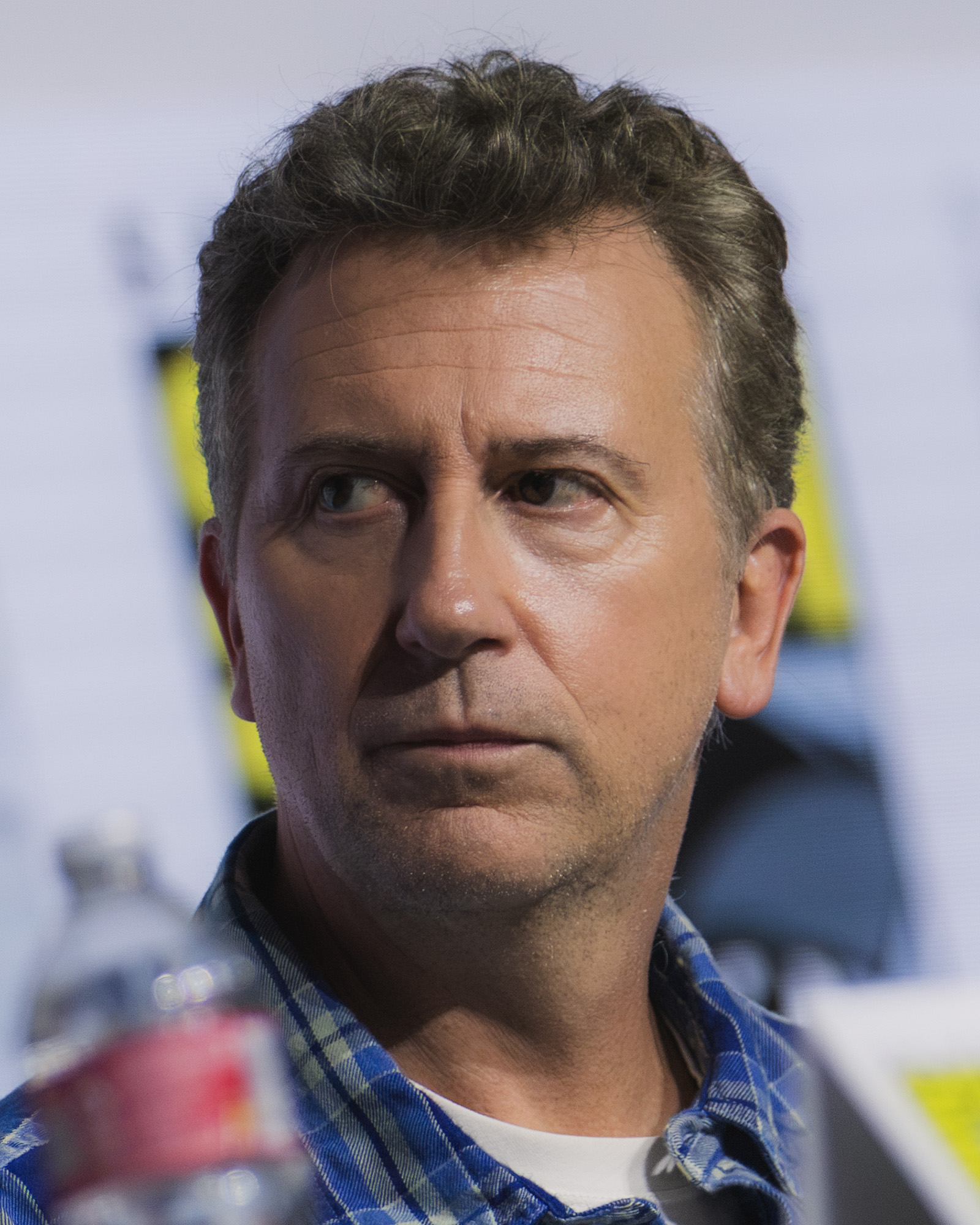
Seth Grahame-Smith, Rick Famuyiwa, and the duo of John Francis Daley and Jonathan Goldstein were all attached as writers and directors during development, but each left due to creative differences with the studios.

Rick Famuyiwa was hired to take over as director in June 2016. Warner Bros. believed Famuyiwa's vision for the film would resonate with younger audiences and also be compatible with Grahame-Smith's existing script. Filming was expected to begin later in 2016 and was not believed to be delayed by the director change. Famuyiwa's top choice to portray the film's female lead, Iris West, was Kiersey Clemons, who worked with him on Dope (2015). Rita Ora and Lucy Boynton were also in the running for the role, but Clemons was cast at the end of July. At that time, Warner Bros. gave the film's release date to Tomb Raider (2018), leaving The Flash without a release date. In August, Ray Fisher was set to appear in the film, reprising his role as Victor Stone / Cyborg from Batman v Superman and Justice League. Famuyiwa completed a revision of the script a month later, when Gal Gadot was set to reprise her role as Diana Prince / Wonder Woman from Batman v Superman, Wonder Woman (2017), and Justice League, and Billy Crudup was in negotiations to portray Barry's father, Henry Allen. Clemons and Crudup both filmed cameo appearances for Justice League after being cast in The Flash. Pre-production began by October 2016 ahead of a filming start in March 2017, scheduled before another commitment that Ezra Miller had in July. Oliva and Famuyiwa worked together for six-to-seven months up to that point. They planned for the character Eobard Thawne / Reverse-Flash to serve as a background antagonist before being revealed as the main antagonist of the DCEU in an adaptation of the animated series Justice League Unlimited (2004–2006) and The Flashpoint Paradox, which was intended to reboot the DCEU. At the end of October, Famuyiwa left the project after he could not "come together creatively" with the studio, which disagreed with the more mature direction that he wanted to take the film.

After Famuyiwa's exit, the film was put on hold while the studio searched for a new director, Miller prepared to film Fantastic Beasts: The Crimes of Grindelwald (2018), and Oliva transitioned to work on reshoots for Wonder Woman. During that time, Warner Bros. decided to take the film in a new direction, and in January 2017, Joby Harold was hired to perform a page-one rewrite of the script. He turned in a draft by May, when the studio's top choices to direct were Robert Zemeckis and Matthew Vaughn. Both had expressed interest in the project, but had potential scheduling issues that could prevent them from taking it on. Raimi, Marc Webb, Jordan Peele, and the DCEU's Bruce Wayne / Batman actor Ben Affleck had already turned down offers to direct the film. Lord and Miller had also met with DC Films executives about potentially writing and directing The Flash during a production hiatus from Solo. At the July 2017 San Diego Comic-Con, the film was announced with the new title Flashpoint, based on the 2011 comic book storyline, in which Allen travels back in time to save his mother's life and accidentally creates an alternate timeline. Dan Mazeau returned to contribute to the script during this time. Johns confirmed in November that the Flashpoint concept would allow the film to tell a unique story about Batman, with the comic book storyline exploring a timeline where Thomas Wayne is Batman. Jeffrey Dean Morgan expressed interest in reprising his role as Thomas Wayne from Batman v Superman.

In January 2018, Warner Bros. executive Walter Hamada was appointed to oversee the DCEU as the new president of DC Films. Later that month, the filmmaking duo of John Francis Daley and Jonathan Goldstein entered negotiations to direct Flashpoint after the studio chose not to wait for Zemeckis's schedule to be free. Warner Bros. approached the duo about working on a DC property due to their work with that studio on the film Game Night (2018) as well as the MCU film Spider-Man: Homecoming (2017). Daley and Goldstein read several scripts before selecting Flashpoint because they were fans of the Flash character. They pitched depicting the Flash as a grounded, imperfect superhero who is just learning his powers. Negotiations with the duo continued through February, and they were confirmed as directors in March. The film's title reverted to The Flash the next month. Filming was expected to begin in Atlanta in February or March 2019, but Miller's commitments to Fantastic Beasts: The Secrets of Dumbledore (2022) delayed filming again by October 2018, when it was expected to start later in 2019. The Flash was aiming for a 2021 release at that point. Daley and Goldstein were also set as the film's writers by the end of February 2019, when Michael Disco joined to produce the film through his newly formed production company, the Disco Factory, after working with the pair on Game Night.

In March 2019, Miller was revealed to be writing a new version of the film's script with comic book writer Grant Morrison. Miller was not pleased with earlier drafts and disagreed with the lighthearted approach to the film that Daley and Goldstein were taking, although that was Warner Bros.'s preferred direction for the film, and they subsequently approached Morrison with their ideas. Warner Bros. gave the pair two weeks to write the script in Scotland. Morrison described their script as a science fiction Flash story similar to Zemeckis's film Back to the Future (1985) that incorporated dark aspects related to the Flashpoint story but did not have a dark tone. The new script could be submitted to the studio by the end of the month, and if the studio did not like Miller and Morrison's take, there was potential for the actor to leave the film; Miller's holding deal to star in the film was expected to end in May. The studio rejected Miller and Morrison's script in May, instead wanting the film to explore the DC multiverse and other DC characters, but asked Miller to remain as the star of the film. Daley and Goldstein left the project in June 2019 due to creative differences, and they chose to work on Dungeons & Dragons: Honor Among Thieves (2023) instead. The duo's exit was confirmed the following month.

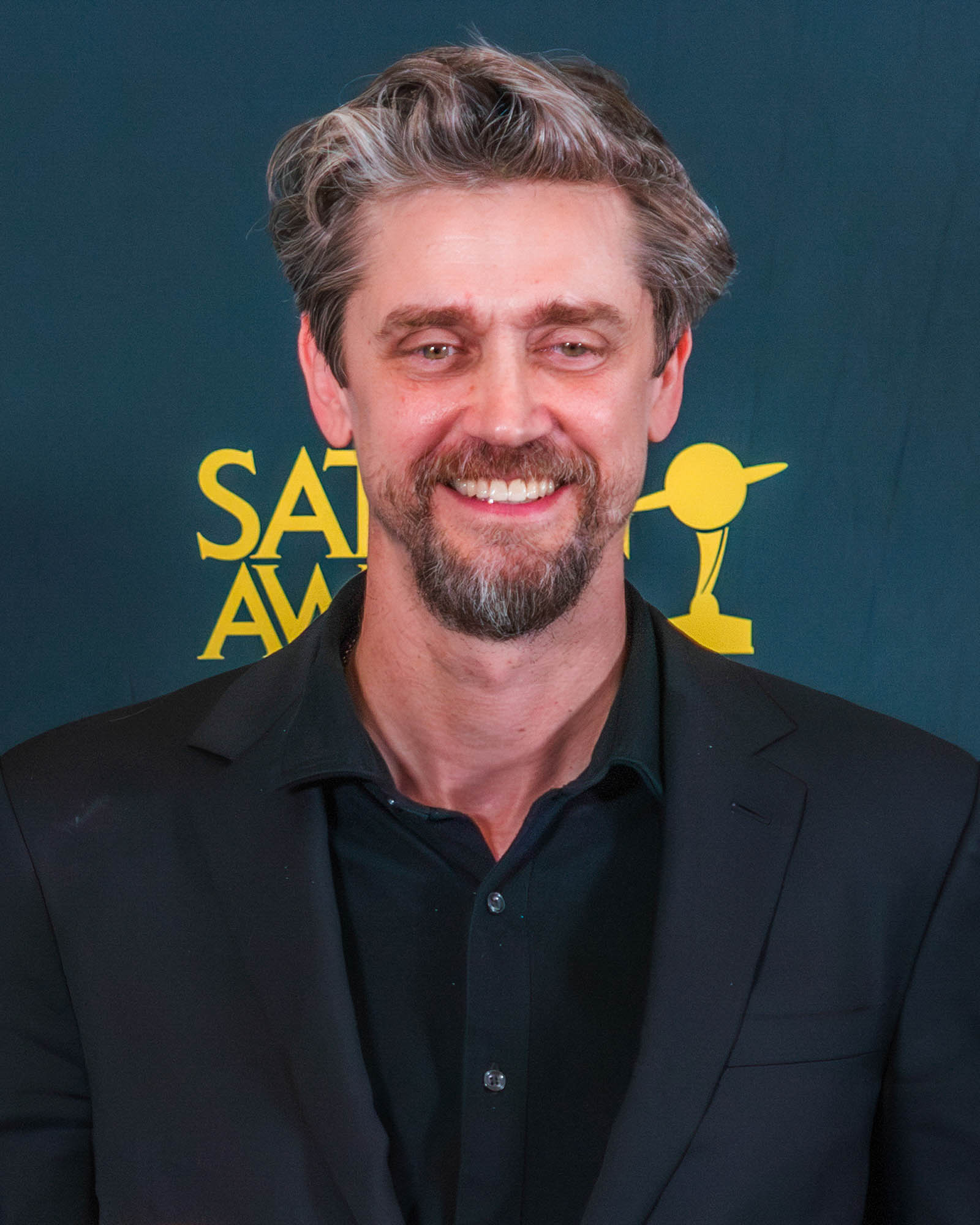
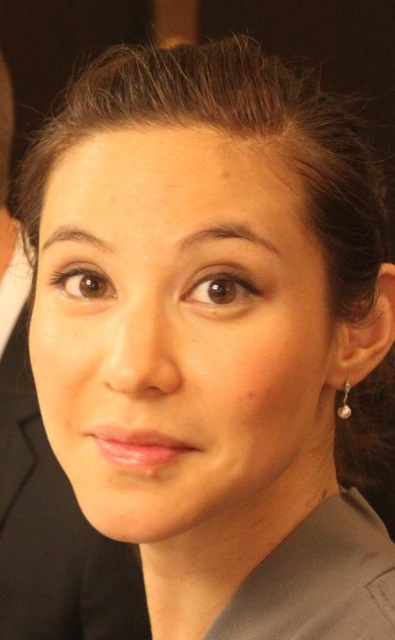
Andy Muschietti and Christina Hodson took over as the final director and screenwriter of The Flash.

Warner Bros. chose Christina Hodson to write a new screenplay for The Flash in July 2019, after she wrote its DCEU film Birds of Prey (2020). She was set to write another DCEU film, Batgirl, after completing her work on The Flash. Andy Muschietti entered negotiations to direct The Flash, with his sister Barbara joining to produce alongside Disco. Muschietti intended for The Flash to be his next project after taking a short break following It Chapter Two (2019), and a January 2020 pre-production start was expected. He did not intend for the film to have horror elements and described his take as fun, emotional, and a "beautiful human story". The involvement of Muschietti and Hodson was confirmed in November 2019, when filming was expected to begin in 2021 after Miller finished filming The Secrets of Dumbledore. While the screenplay for The Flash was being written around this time, DC Comics president Jim Lee approached Miller about appearing alongside Grant Gustin as Barry Allen / The Flash from the Arrowverse in that franchise's television crossover event "Crisis on Infinite Earths" (2019–20), which acknowledges a wider DC multiverse, during editing of the event. Guggenheim wrote a brief scene featuring both actors, while Miller and Gustin improvised much of their dialogue on set, including Gustin's version inspiring Miller's character to use "the Flash" as his superhero alias. Guggenheim would not address whether the events of the Arrowverse crossover, which saw some universes destroyed, meant that Miller's Flash still existed, while Lee and Adam Schlagman, the vice president of film at DC Entertainment, ensured Guggenheim's scripts did not conflict with this film. In December 2019, Warner Bros. scheduled The Flash for release on July 1, 2022.

=== Pre-production ===
In January 2020, Muschietti said the film would still adapt elements of the Flashpoint comic book storyline because the studio wanted to use that story, but it would tell a different version of it. This allowed for Batman to be featured in the film and for that comic's focus on time travel to be incorporated with the exploration of the Flash's origin story, in which his mother is killed, and his father is wrongfully convicted for her murder. Muschietti compared the Flashpoint comic to the horror film Jacob's Ladder (1990) for its structure and likened the film's version of the comic story to a suspense film because of its build-up. He felt that the Flash's prior appearances in the DCEU gave the audience a deeper understanding of the character, allowing for a more emotional experience and a richer story. In April, the film's release date was moved forward to June 3, 2022, when Warner Bros. adjusted its release schedule because of the COVID-19 pandemic.

Michael Keaton entered early negotiations in June 2020 to reprise his role as Bruce Wayne / Batman from director Tim Burton's films Batman (1989) and Batman Returns (1992). The Flash was set to disregard the subsequent Batman films that did not feature Keaton—Batman Forever (1995) and Batman & Robin (1997)—and was reaffirmed to introduce the multiverse to the DCEU, with Keaton's version of the character originating from an alternate universe Barry creates in the film. Filming was eyed to begin in the first quarter of 2021, depending on COVID-19 protocols. Fisher discussed his role as Cyborg in the film with Muschietti that month before Warner Bros. set a two-week shoot for Fisher to film what was referred to as a cameo appearance alongside other Justice League actors. Fisher said the studio offered him only a fraction of his traditional salary to reprise the role. In August, Keaton was confirmed to be appearing in the film, and Affleck agreed to reprise his version of Batman. Muschietti explained that the film would introduce the idea of the multiverse to general audiences by featuring multiple versions of characters and acknowledging past DC film franchises as alternate universes. It was important for Muschietti to include Affleck in the film since his version of Batman is the "baseline" for the DCEU, and he felt the introduction of Keaton's Batman would not work as well without first seeing the Flash's relationship with Affleck's Batman. Affleck chose to return after retiring from the role because he would have a smaller role in the film.

"We almost started from scratch. We did have a base of a story that was inherited from previous iterations. The studio knew they wanted to do some kind of interpretation of Flashpoint, but I didn't want this to be a literal translation of the comic book. I respect the fandom a lot, but I think the fandom would also expect new things from a movie. Just a literal interpretation of Flashpoint the comic would fall flat in my opinion, so we populated it with twists and turns to make the story a little more fun."

— Andy Muschietti on how the film's prior iterations and the Flashpoint comic influenced the final film

During the virtual DC FanDome event "Explore the Multiverse" in September 2020, Barbara Muschietti said the film would feature many characters from the DC Universe, and the Flash would serve as the bridge between them and their different timelines. She added that the film would be used to restart the continuity of the DCEU without disregarding the events of the prior films. Crudup, who left the film during the changes in directors, entered negotiations to rejoin a month later. Clemons's involvement was uncertain at that point. The film's release date was pushed back to November 4, 2022, due to further pandemic-related delays, and filming was set to begin in March 2021 in London. Warner Bros. had Cyborg written out of the film by January 2021 after Fisher refused to work on any project involving Hamada. Fisher said this was due to Hamada's handling of an investigation into the on-set behavior of Justice League's replacement director, Joss Whedon. The role of Cyborg was not expected to be recast. At that time, the Muschiettis were preparing for production in the United Kingdom, with filming set to begin in April at Warner Bros. Studios Leavesden, after Miller finished on The Secrets of Dumbledore. Construction of the sets at Leavesden Studios had begun by February, with the production creating a life-sized replica of the Batcave from scratch while the Batmobile used in Keaton's films was transported to the set from Los Angeles using an airport cargo truck, due to a global shortage of shipping containers at the time. Paul Austerberry and Alexandra Byrne were the respective production and costume designers.

Sasha Calle was cast as Kara Zor-El / Supergirl later in February 2021, and signed a multi-film contract for the DCEU. Calle was chosen from a group of more than 425 actresses that also included Bruna Marquezine and Rachel Zegler, who were later cast in the DCEU as Jenny Kord for Blue Beetle (2023) and Anthea for Shazam! Fury of the Gods (2023). All auditions for the role, as well as chemistry tests with Miller, took place over Zoom. At that time, Crudup was confirmed to be returning as Henry Allen, but was forced to drop out of the film the following month because of scheduling conflicts with his series The Morning Show (2019–present). Ron Livingston was subsequently cast to replace Crudup as Henry Allen, alongside Maribel Verdú as Barry's mother, Nora Allen, while Clemons signed a new deal to star as Iris West in the film after her role in Justice League was cut, but that cameo was restored in the director's cut, Zack Snyder's Justice League (2021). Other actors cast then were Ian Loh as a young Barry Allen, Saoirse-Monica Jackson as Patty Spivot, and Rudy Mancuso as Albert Desmond. At the end of the month, Keaton said he had received an older version of the script but had not yet read it and would have to read the latest draft before deciding if he would commit to the film. He also cited the COVID-19 pandemic in the United Kingdom as a concern for his involvement, as well as balancing his other commitments. Before filming began, Keaton was reaffirmed to be starring in the film after his prior comments cast some doubt about his involvement, with Muschietti believing Keaton's decision to commit to The Flash was due to the script that he had been sent. Muschietti said Keaton felt honored to play Batman again. The Muschiettis formed a production company, Double Dream, to co-produce the film, and Marianne Jenkins was revealed as an executive producer. Fisher said he would be disappointed if the situation surrounding his involvement in the film was not resolved, and that he was open to returning to the role of Cyborg for the film if Warner Bros. were to make amends with him.

=== Filming ===
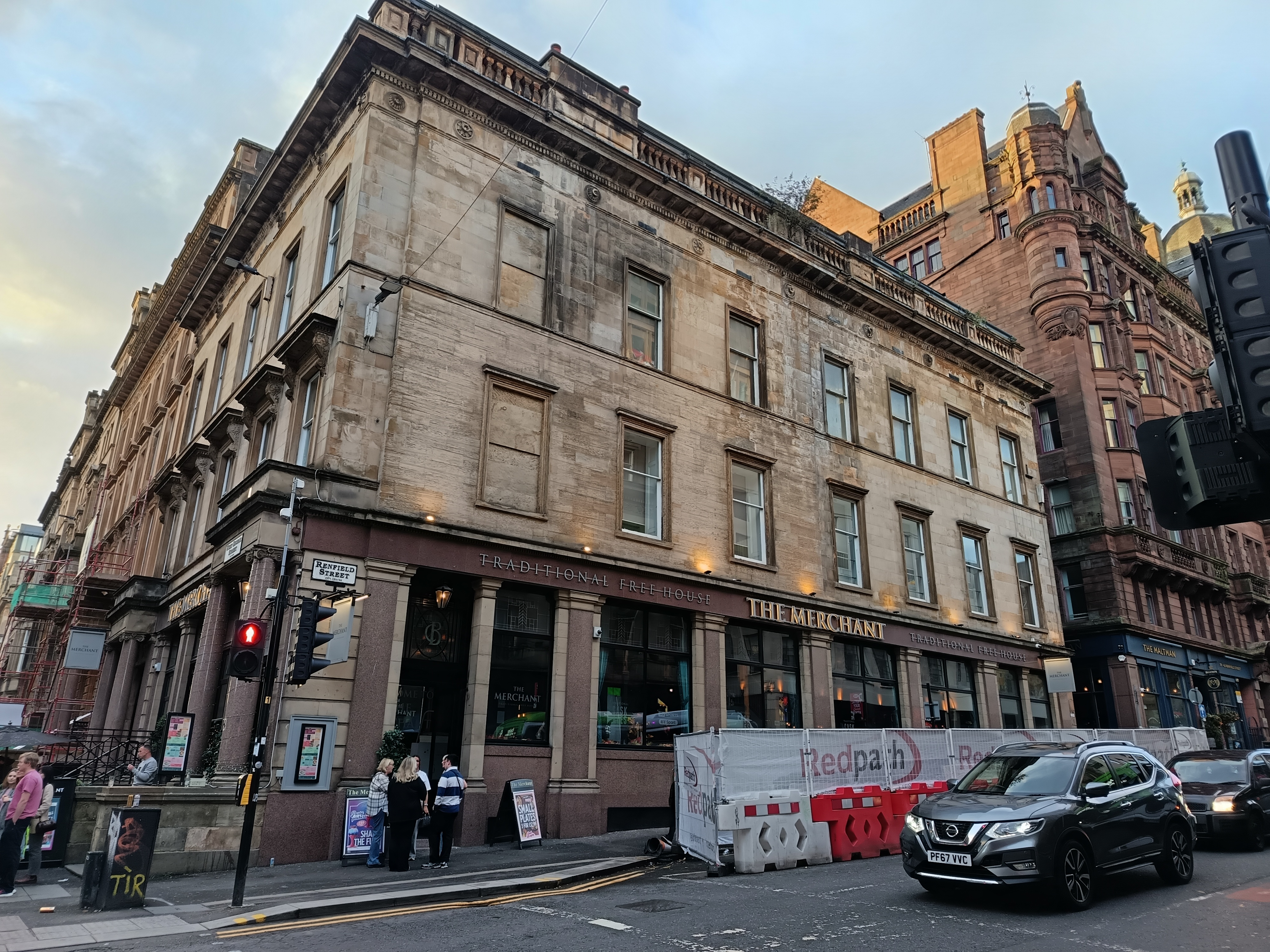
An on-set accident occurred during filming at the intersection of Renfield Street and West George Street in Glasgow, Scotland, which temporarily halted production.

Principal photography began on April 19, 2021, at Warner Bros. Studios Leavesden, in Watford, England, under the working title Baby Shower. Henry Braham was the cinematographer after previously working on the DCEU film The Suicide Squad (2021). He described the film as "technically complex" despite not being based in realism. In early May, filming took place at Burghley House in Stamford, Lincolnshire, which doubled for Wayne Manor. In the middle of June, Miller, Clemons, Keaton, and Calle filmed scenes at St Paul's Cathedral in London, with the surrounding locations designed to portray Central City. Filming was also set to occur later that month in Edinburgh and Glasgow—doubling for Gotham City—for scenes with Affleck and Keaton. In late July, filming continued in Glasgow at Ingram Street, George Square, John Street, and Cochrane Street and involved several vehicles, while filming with the Batmobile occurred in George Square, but was temporarily halted after a camera operator on a motorcycle shooting behind the Batcycle on Renfield Street collided with it near West George Street. The operator was injured but not "seriously hurt". Keaton finished filming his scenes by the middle of August. In early September, Luke Brandon Field said he had joined the cast, playing Al Falcone. Filming lasted 138 days, and wrapped on October 18, 2021. During production, Miller filmed a cameo appearance for the first-season finale of the DCEU series Peacemaker (2022).

=== Post-production ===
==== Visual effects work and Ezra Miller controversy ====
In December 2021, Michael Shannon and Antje Traue were revealed to be reprising their roles from Man of Steel (2013) as General Zod and Faora-Ul, respectively. Daley and Goldstein, former co-writers and co-directors of the film, were also confirmed to be receiving story credit for the film alongside Hodson. Temuera Morrison, who portrays Aquaman's father, Thomas Curry, in Aquaman (2018) and Aquaman and the Lost Kingdom (2023), was reported to be in the film in February 2022. In March, Warner Bros. adjusted its release schedule due to the impact of the COVID-19 pandemic on the workload of visual effects vendors. The Flash was moved to June 23, 2023, to give VFX teams more time to complete work; it had around 2,500 visual effects shots. In April 2022, Discovery, Inc. and WarnerMedia merged to become Warner Bros. Discovery (WBD), led by president and CEO David Zaslav. The new company was expected to restructure DC Entertainment, and Zaslav began searching for an equivalent to Marvel Studios president Kevin Feige to lead the new subsidiary.

The final writing credits for The Flash were also revealed in April: Hodson received screenplay credit; Daley, Goldstein, and Harold received screen story credit; and off-screen credit for additional writing material went to Rebecca Drysdale, Famuyiwa, Grahame-Smith, Johns, Lord, Christopher Miller, Ezra Miller, Morrison, and Adam Sztykiel. In May, Deadline Hollywood reported that an unspecified "high-profile" comic book film that would be released in 2023 had its script recently submitted to the Writers Guild of America (WGA), having a total of 45 writers involved in it throughout its development. Some commentators believed that the film was The Flash, due to its lengthy development process. Miller later participated in "regularly scheduled additional photography" in the middle of 2022. By August, the visual effects were expected to be completed by the end of the year, and were provided by DNEG, Scanline VFX, and Wētā FX. John "DJ" Desjardin served as the VFX supervisor after working on several DCEU films, while Paul Machliss and Jason Ballantine co-edited the film; Ballantine previously collaborated on Muschietti's films It (2017) and It Chapter Two. Machliss said the film was the first to use new technology to feature different versions of an actor on-screen, while Muschietti said the film's visual effects were intentionally designed as being viewed from the Flash's perspective. He added that his initial cut of the film was around four hours long and featured additional "nostalgic" cameos and a different ending that were cut.

"Having recently gone through a time of intense crisis, I now understand that I am suffering complex mental health issues and have begun ongoing treatment. I want to apologize to everyone that I have alarmed and upset with my past behavior. I am committed to doing the necessary work to get back to a healthy, safe and productive stage in my life."

— Ezra Miller's statement apologizing for their controversial behavior, released following reports that it could impact the film's fate

Following several controversial incidents and arrests involving Ezra Miller throughout 2022, WBD considered various options for the film after previously hoping that delaying its release would help avoid controversy. In August, WBD was considering three options: providing Miller an interview explaining their behavior and doing limited press for the film should they choose to accept professional help, with the film being released as planned; excluding Miller from all press of the film and recasting their character in future projects should they choose to reject professional help; or canceling the film as a "last resort" if the situation further deteriorated. The latter was considered an "unprecedented move" due to its large budget, although it would have come after WBD already canceled the nearly complete $90 million film Batgirl that was being produced for the streaming service HBO Max. WBD was not considering recasting Miller's role in the film because they were portraying multiple characters and appearing in nearly every scene. It was also considered "key" to the studio's future DCEU plans and was well-received during test screenings despite Miller's legal troubles. Zaslav reiterated that The Flash received positive responses from the studio, and that they were committed to releasing it in theaters. Miller released a public apology through their representative soon afterward and announced they were seeking professional treatment for "complex mental health issues". Soon after, Miller and their agent met with Michael De Luca and Pamela Abdy, the co-chairpersons and co-CEOs of Warner Bros. Pictures Group, to apologize for their behavior. Barbara Muschietti later rejected reports that the film's release would have been canceled due to Miller's actions.

==== Revisions to the ending and character cameos ====
The ending of the film, which features Miller's Barry believing he successfully altered the timeline before realizing it has been further altered, was changed multiple times during post-production due to leadership changes at Warner Bros. throughout 2022. The originally filmed ending featured Calle's Supergirl and Keaton's Batman, reversing those characters' deaths from earlier in the film, and was planned by Hamada and Warner Bros. Pictures chairman Toby Emmerich to set up a sequel and a film based on the "Crisis on Infinite Earths" (1985–1986) crossover storyline that was intended to reset the DCEU. After WBD was formed, Hamada and Emmerich exited their roles, and De Luca and Abdy were appointed to temporarily oversee its DC productions. An alternate ending was filmed in September 2022 that included Miller, Calle, and Keaton alongside Henry Cavill and Gal Gadot in their DCEU roles of Kal-El / Superman and Wonder Woman. Calle remained in this scene, which was intended to set up future appearances for Supergirl, because executives did not want her character's last appearance to be a death scene and were open to Calle reprising her role. Despite this, a planned Supergirl spin-off film written by Ana Nogueira had already been canceled at this time. Cavill's involvement came after he made a cameo appearance in the DCEU film Black Adam (2022), and it was intended to set up a planned Man of Steel sequel, while Gadot's appearance was intended to "keep Wonder Woman in the cultural conversation" while a sequel to Wonder Woman and Wonder Woman 1984 (2020) was in development. Keaton had also been slated to reprise his role as Batman in various DC projects to take on a mentor role similar to that of Samuel L. Jackson's MCU character Nick Fury, and was cast to appear in Batgirl and a film based on the animated series Batman Beyond (1999–2001), also written by Hodson, before both were shelved.

Writer/director James Gunn and producer Peter Safran, who had worked on prior DCEU media, were hired as the co-chairmen and co-CEOs of the newly formed DC Studios at the end of October 2022. A week after starting their new roles, the pair had begun developing an eight-to-ten-year plan for a new franchise called the DC Universe (DCU) that would be a soft reboot of the DCEU. In December, the film's release date was moved forward to June 16, 2023, following positive test screenings. Cavill's involvement was revealed then along with Jason Momoa having a cameo as Aquaman. At that time, Gunn and Safran felt that including Cavill and Gadot's scenes in the ending could potentially promise audiences something that was not part of their plans for the DCU. WBD was also reconsidering whether to retain their scenes, depending on those plans, which had not yet been finalized since The Flash had not yet reached picture lock. Cavill and Gadot's cameos in the ending were ultimately cut after DC Studios chose not to move forward with the sequels to Man of Steel and Wonder Woman 1984. Cavill was paid $250,000 for his cameo, and his likeness was briefly used in the film through computer-generated imagery (CGI). Gunn and Safran enjoyed Nogueira's work on the Supergirl film so much that they had her return to write their own take for the DCU film Supergirl (2026), which does not star Calle.

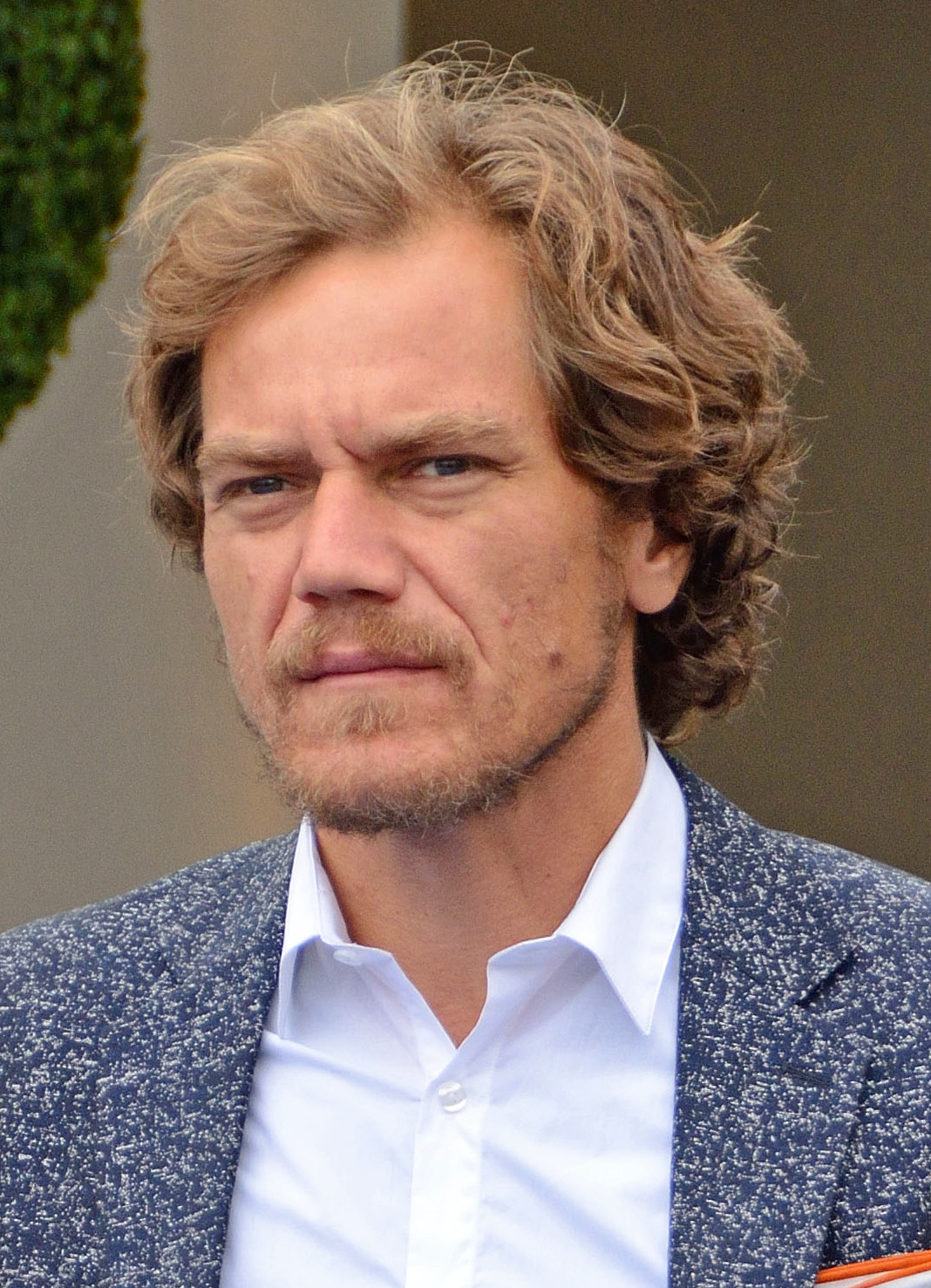
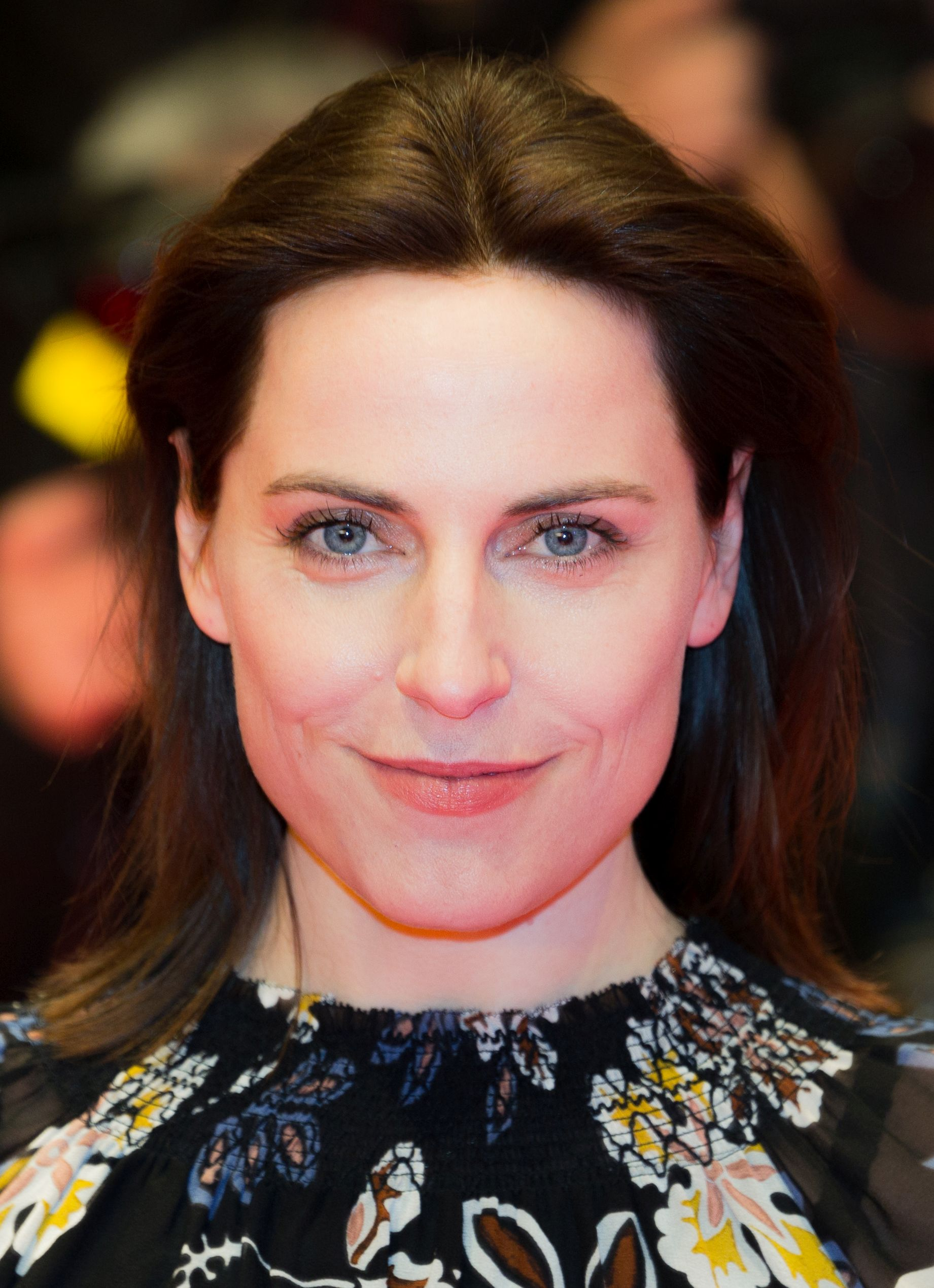
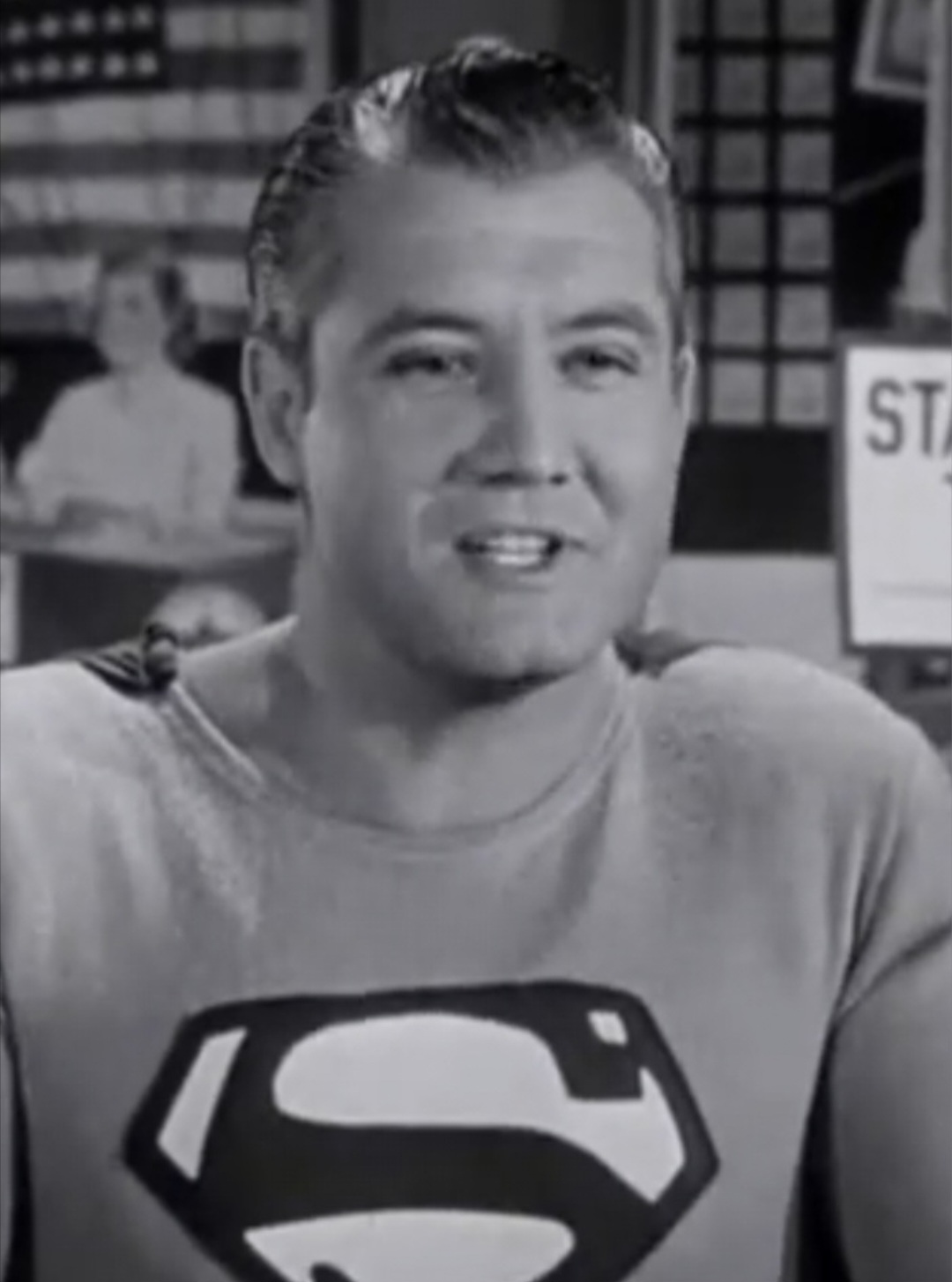
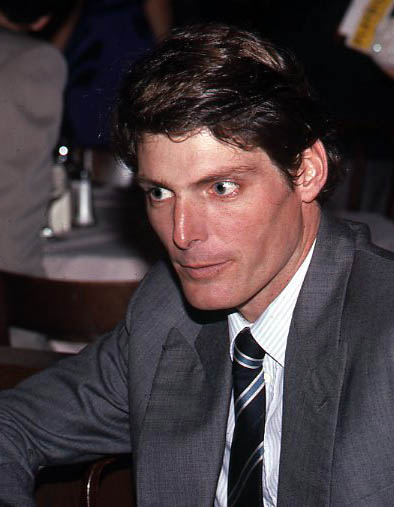
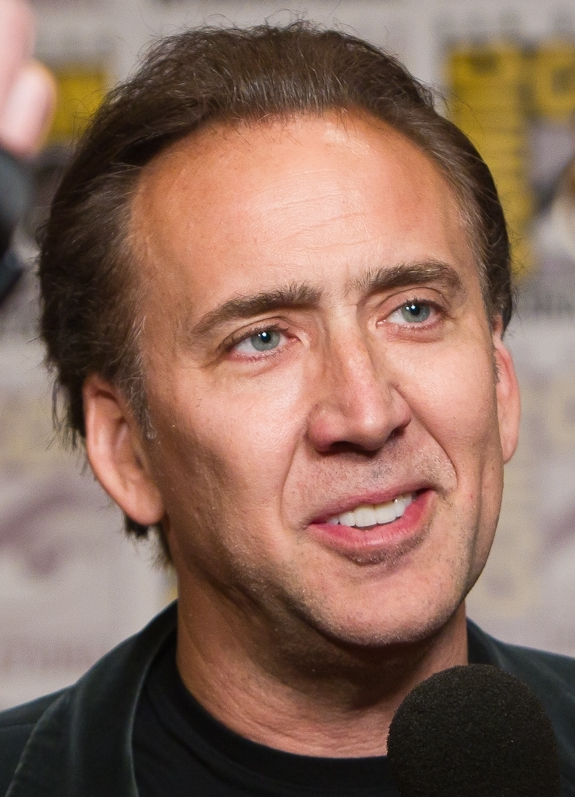
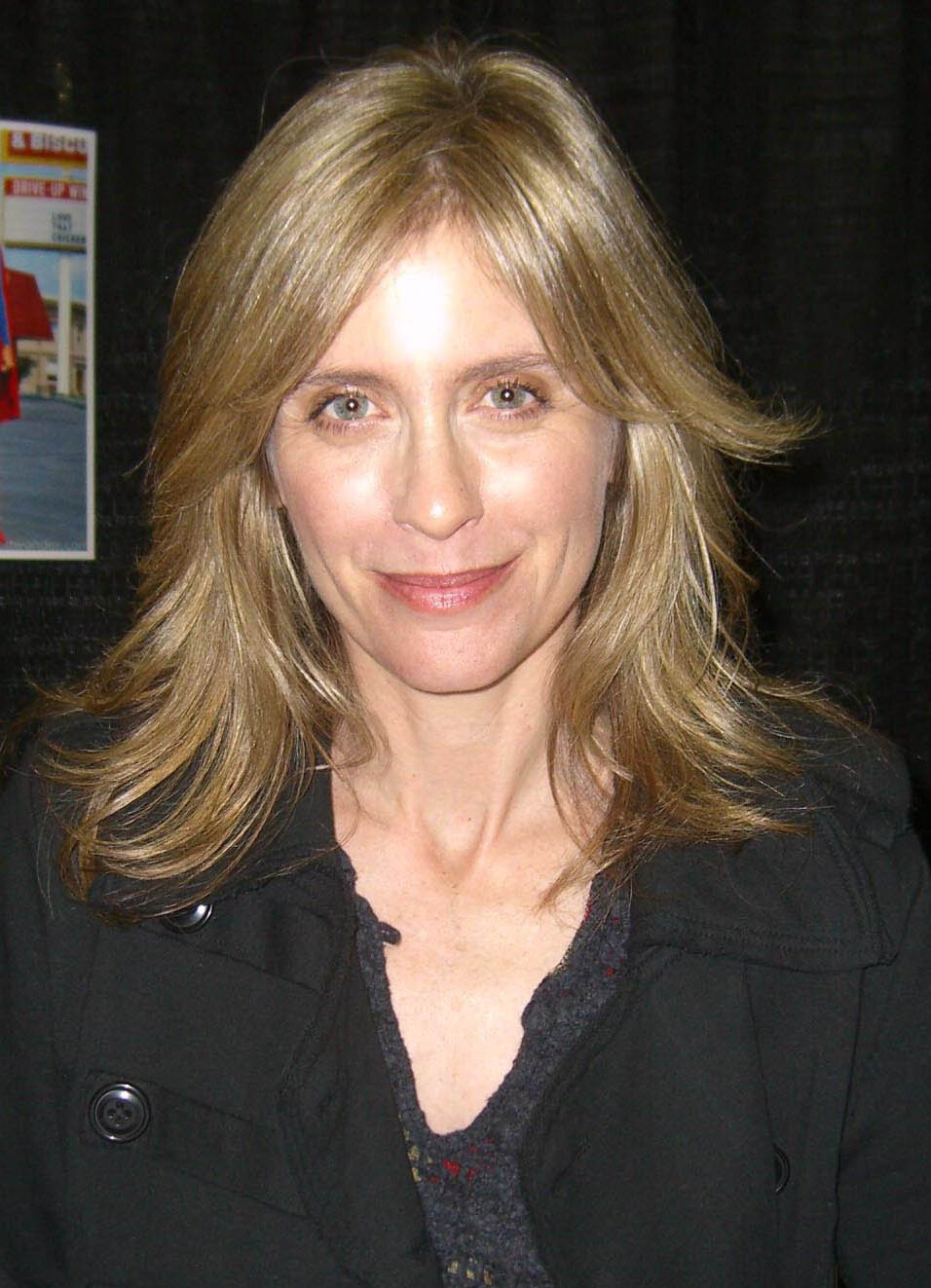
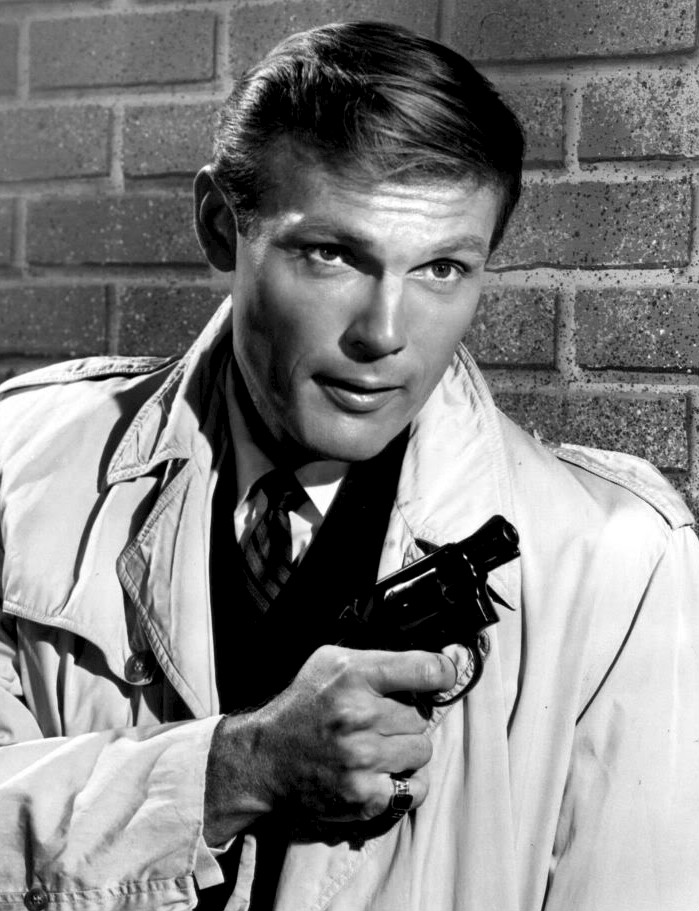
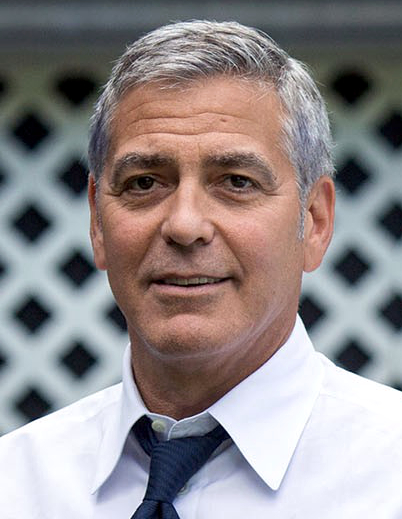
Actors appearing as different versions of DC characters include Michael Shannon as General Zod; Antje Traue as Faora-Ul; George Reeves, Christopher Reeve, and Nicolas Cage as versions of Superman; Helen Slater as Supergirl; and Adam West and George Clooney as versions of Batman, with Clooney appearing in the film's ending.

Following the alterations made in post-production, Gunn and Safran arranged for George Clooney to reprise his role as another version of Batman from Batman & Robin (1997), replacing Affleck's version in the timeline, in a third version of the ending. This idea came after a recurring joke during production about how many versions of Batman could be included in the film. Clooney agreed to join the project after he and his talent agent Bryan Lourd were shown a mostly completed cut, which they reportedly liked, and Clooney filmed his scenes with Miller for half a day in January 2023, in what was described as a "quick and efficient shoot". Miller received advice from Clooney on handling publicity and his behavior between takes, and Miller was said to be in "top form". This ending with Clooney was kept a secret until the film's release. In March, Affleck revealed that he had filmed a scene with Gadot, who appeared in an in-progress cut of the film screened at CinemaCon the following month.

Later in April 2023, Muschietti revealed some of the planned cameos that did not make the final film, including Lynda Carter's Wonder Woman from the television series Wonder Woman (1975–1979), Marlon Brando's Jor-El from Superman (1978), Burgess Meredith's the Penguin and Cesar Romero's the Joker from the series Batman (1966–1968), and Grant Gustin's Barry Allen from the Arrowverse continuity (2013–2023). Gustin was not approached to appear in the film, although the Golden Age incarnation of the Flash, Jay Garrick, does appear in the film's Chronobowl Speed Force sequence, with the character's likeness based on Ballantine; the character was initially believed to be based on the appearance of Teddy Sears's Hunter Zolomon / "Jay Garrick" from the Arrowverse, but he was not involved.

Multiple other cameos are featured in the film as part of the Chronobowl sequence. Nicolas Cage portrays an alternate version of Superman, whom he was cast to play in 1997 for Tim Burton's unproduced film Superman Lives. Cage filmed his scenes using volumetric capture and was digitally de-aged for the role. He is depicted fighting a giant spider, a move that paid homage to a scene producer Jon Peters wanted to include in Burton's film. Cage originally filmed a different scene of his character standing in an alternate universe while witnessing its destruction. For that scene, Cage said that he conveyed the character's emotions in his eyes with no dialogue. Previous incarnations of Superman, Batman, and Supergirl also appear in the sequence through the use of artificial intelligence and deepfake technology, including Christopher Reeve as Superman from the 1978–1987 Superman films, Helen Slater as Supergirl from Supergirl (1984), Adam West as Batman from the film Batman (1966) and the 1966 Batman series, and George Reeves as his version of Superman from Superman and the Mole Men (1951) and Adventures of Superman (1952–1958), through archive footage. West's appearance was almost cut before Muschietti chose to retain it because he and Barbara felt personally attached to the series, which they watched reruns of during their childhood in Argentina. Muschietti said the crew was given "total freedom" with these cameos.

== Music ==
Benjamin Wallfisch was set to compose the film's score by April 2021, after previously collaborating with Muschietti on It and It Chapter Two as well as scoring the DCEU film Shazam! (2019). By late August 2022, Wallfisch was set to begin a scoring session at Abbey Road Studios in London. Wallfisch referenced the themes from the 1989 Batman score and the Batman Returns soundtrack by composer Danny Elfman throughout the film, due to the inclusion of Keaton's Batman.

== Marketing ==
Miller debuted the first footage from the film at the virtual DC FanDome event in October 2021. They said there was not enough footage available to make a full trailer or teaser, but William Hughes at The A.V. Club felt the footage could comfortably be categorized as a teaser. He said being able to see it was proof of the film being made after its long and troubled production history. Polygon's Matt Patches and io9's James Whitbrook both highlighted the footage as the beginning of the DC multiverse on film, with its hints at Keaton's version of Batman and the reveal that Miller would portray multiple versions of Barry Allen. In February 2022, more footage was released as part of a teaser for Warner Bros.'s 2022 slate of DC films, which also included The Batman, Black Adam, and Aquaman and the Lost Kingdom (before The Flash and Aquaman and the Lost Kingdom were delayed to 2023). A new trailer was shown at Warner Bros.'s CinemaCon panel in April 2022, and was noted by attendees for Keaton's Batman reusing the line "You wanna get nuts? Let's get nuts" from Batman. The following month, the costumes for the Flash and Supergirl were shown at Warner Bros.'s booth at the Licensing Expo in Las Vegas.

DC Comics published a three-issue prequel comic book limited series titled The Flash: The Fastest Man Alive, starting in September 2022, written by Kenny Porter. It is set after the events of Justice League and depicts Batman training the Flash and the Flash's early days as he attempts to defeat various supervillains. The first trailer for The Flash was shown during Super Bowl LVII on February 12, 2023, before playing in theaters ahead of Ant-Man and the Wasp: Quantumania. The trailer had the most engagement on social media, outpacing other trailers that were shown for Guardians of the Galaxy Vol. 3 and Transformers: Rise of the Beasts, with RelishMix reporting the trailer gained 97.4M views within 24 hours. Many commentators highlighted Keaton's reprisal as Batman and Calle's role as Supergirl and also noted the de-emphasized focus on Miller's Flash following their controversies. Charles Pulliam-Moore of The Verge particularly felt that "it's the other heroes they're [the Flash] going to be allying with who are likely to steal the show", and felt that Supergirl and Keaton's Batman were being posited as the film's "World's Finest", and expressed enthusiasm for Supergirl's role in the story. Alli Rosenbloom at CNN also praised Keaton's appearance, highlighting the usage of Danny Elfman's score from Batman, while Collider's Collier Jennings felt that the trailer "certainly is working to sell the image that the wait was worth it".

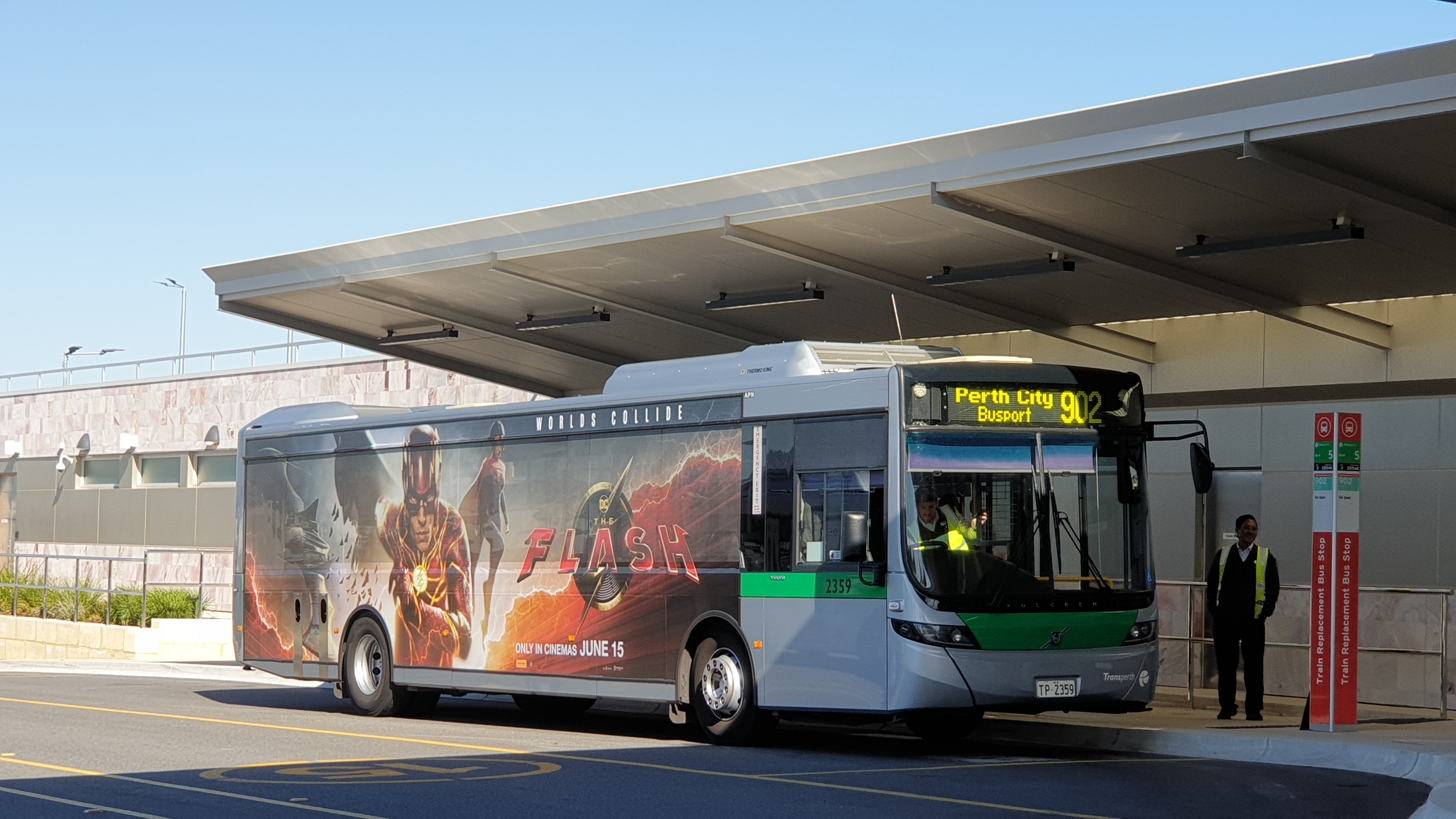
Promotional poster for The Flash on a transit bus in May 2023

In April 2023, DC and Warner Bros. Discovery Global Consumer Products unveiled a series of merchandise to coincide with the release of the film, including toys produced by Mattel, Funko, Spin Master, and McFarlane Toys, as well as costumes by Rubies and Puma shoes. It was also announced that a visual companion would accompany the film's release, titled The Flash: The Official Visual Companion: The Scarlet Speedster from Page to Screen, written by Richard Lotowcyz and published by Insight Editions. An in-progress cut of the film was screened at CinemaCon on April 25, 2023. Warner Bros. was estimated to have spent over $14 million to promote the film via TV spots and trailers during the 2023 NBA playoffs. A second trailer and poster were released online the same day. Joshua Rivera at Polygon noted the trailer focused heavily on Keaton's Batman, including starting and ending with him, and felt it leaned into nostalgia, while David Crow of Den of Geek compared the trailer's tone and Batcave design to that of director Christopher Nolan's The Dark Knight Trilogy (2005–2012). The final trailer, set to Pink Floyd's "Time", was released on May 22, 2023. The trailer confirmed the appearance of Jeremy Irons, reprising his DCEU role as Alfred Pennyworth. Shortly after the film's release, a six-part Apple podcast titled The Flash: Escape the Midnight Circus was announced. Max Greenfield voices Barry Allen / The Flash in the podcast, which takes place a few years after the film's ending. The podcast series was included with the film's physical home media release.

Warner Bros. struggled to market the film due to Miller's legal issues. Borys Kit and Aaron Couch of The Hollywood Reporter reported that the studio focused on marketing the "film itself" rather than Miller; during press conferences, the studio opted to sideline Miller and pivot towards the Muschiettis and Calle to promote the film. The studio also made intensive efforts to highlight Keaton's role as Batman to evoke nostalgia, though Kit and Couch felt the results were mixed, as they opined that some thought it was derivative of Spider-Man: No Way Home (2021). Additionally, the studio provided advanced screenings to various figures, including actor Tom Cruise and author Stephen King, to improve discourse surrounding the film, while Zaslav and Gunn touted it as "among the greatest superhero movies of all time". Various insiders felt the marketing campaign was unconventional and that Warner Bros. was setting very high expectations for the film. Miller ultimately attended the film's premiere for photos only and would not be interviewed.

== Release ==
=== Theatrical ===
The Flash premiered on June 12, 2023, at Grauman's Chinese Theatre in Hollywood, Los Angeles, and was released by Warner Bros. Pictures in the United States on June 16, 2023. The film was initially scheduled for release on March 23, 2018, when Warner Bros. first announced its slate of DCEU films, before it was moved to March 16. In July 2016, this release date was given to Tomb Raider, and The Flash was not given another release date until Muschietti's hiring in 2019, after which the film was slated for release on July 1, 2022. It was then moved up to June 3, before it was delayed to November 4, 2022, when Warner Bros. adjusted its release schedule because of the COVID-19 pandemic. The studio then delayed the release date to June 23, 2023, due to the pandemic's impact on the workload of visual effects vendors, before moving it forward a week to June 16 after positive test screenings.

=== Home media ===
The Flash was released on digital download and on the non-fungible token (NFT) Eluvio blockchain by Warner Bros. Home Entertainment on July 18, 2023, making it one of the first feature films to be made available on a blockchain. This was followed by its release on the Warner Bros. streaming service Max on August 25, and on Ultra HD Blu-ray, Blu-ray, and DVD on August 29, 2023.

== Reception ==
=== Box-office performance ===
The Flash grossed $108.1 million in the United States and Canada, and $163.3 million in other territories, for a worldwide gross of $271.4 million. It was a box-office bomb, with projected losses for Warner Bros. to be as much as $200 million. Several publications commented on its box office revenue, with The Hollywood Reporter calling it "snubbed" and /Film saying that the hype "proved to be hot air" following poor box-office returns. The film's low box-office opening was attributed to various controversies surrounding Ezra Miller, mixed word-of-mouth, competition from Sony's Spider-Man: Across the Spider-Verse, early hype being "unwarranted", the imminent DCU reboot, superhero fatigue from audiences, and middling critical reviews.

In the United States and Canada, The Flash was released alongside Elemental and The Blackening, and was initially projected to gross $68–85 million from 4,234 theaters in its opening weekend. It was also expected to gross $85–95 million internationally, for a global opening of $155–165 million. However, after making $24.1 million on its first day (including from $9.7 million Thursday night previews), weekend estimates were lowered to $60 million. It went on to have a $55 million domestic opening, with an additional $75 million from international markets, for a worldwide debut of $130 million. In the United Kingdom and Ireland, the film debuted leading the box office with £4.2 million ($5.4 million). The film retained IMAX screens and other premium formats into the following weekend, which could have provided some padding from what was expected to be a steep box-office decline from its opening weekend. In its second weekend, the film dropped 72% to $15.1 million, the third-largest such drop ever for a superhero film up to that point, behind Morbius (2022) and Steel (1997). In its third weekend, the film dropped another 65% to $5.2 million, losing 1,538 theaters and finishing in eighth place in the process.

=== Critical response ===
The Flash received mixed reviews from critics. Early reviews generally praised the humor, action sequences, and the performances, but criticized the third act and visual effects. The review aggregator website Rotten Tomatoes calculated that 63% of 390 critic reviews were positive and the average rating was 6.3 out of 10. The website's critical consensus reads, "The Flash is funny, fittingly fast-paced, and overall ranks as one of the best DC movies in recent years." Metacritic assigned the film a weighted average score of 55 out of 100 based on 55 critics, indicating "mixed or average" reviews. Audiences polled by CinemaScore gave the film an average grade of "B" on an A+ to F scale, tied with Batman v Superman: Dawn of Justice (2016) as the lowest grade for a DCEU film, while PostTrak reported 77% of filmgoers gave it a positive score, with 59% saying they would definitely recommend it.

Rolling Stone's David Fear identified the film as being the best in the DCEU but cited the complicated production and Ezra Miller's legal controversies as detracting elements. Nevertheless, he acknowledged that Miller could adequately portray the two different Barrys, but lamented, "It is not what we'll talk about when we talk about Ezra Miller." He praised Keaton's and Calle's performances, feeling that Batman felt well into the narrative while commenting that the script was "primed for both nimbly quickening the action and slowing down enough to wink, nudge, and crack jokes". He criticized the action sequences, comparing them to cutscenes and the post-credits scene. Joshua Yehl of IGN gave the film a seven out of ten, praising Muschietti's direction and its focus on Barry's "emotional journey". He enjoyed the film's logic and depiction of time travel, while noting that it effectively integrated the Flash's origin story. However, he disliked the inclusion of fan service, the third act, and Supergirl's role in the film. Nevertheless, he praised Keaton and Affleck's performances as Batman and also said Calle did "as much as she can given the thin nature of the role". Ultimately, he opined that it felt like a "love letter to the Snyderverse" and called it a "fitting swan song" for the DCEU.

From Vulture, Angelia Jade Bastién criticized the film for being too dependent upon previous DCEU elements and disliked that the film did not explore Barry's emotions following his mother's death, but instead used the event as a "springboard for uninspired multiverse plotting". She felt Miller's performance was acceptable, the script limited Calle's, and Keaton's was enjoyable. Bastién disliked the visual aesthetic and use of computer-generated imagery (CGI), ultimately describing the film as "the cinematic equivalent of a snake eating its own tail" and "closing down of all the possibilities a multiverse is meant to represent". David Rooney of The Hollywood Reporter praised Miller's performance despite noting their legal troubles impacted the film's reception. He also called Calle a "scene-stealer", and Keaton's "sadness" in portraying Batman. His biggest highlights were the opening sequence, which he felt firmly established the comedic tone; Hodson's writing and characterization of Barry as a "virginal nerd who has gone through college without managing to acquire much self-assurance, even after mastering his superpowers"; and Muschietti's overall direction. However, he criticized the runtime, thought the final act was formulaic, and thought the nostalgic elements "often threatens to marginalize the central plotline" but still managed to "yield pathos" in the narrative.

Manohla Dargis of The New York Times gave a mostly positive, albeit mixed review, appreciating its "relatively brisk" runtime and felt it was a comparatively better superhero film, enjoying the overall cast performances, saying the "overall vibe is upbeat", and praised Muschietti's direction and pacing. However, she criticized the beginning scene, as she did not enjoy the "creepy setup" of falling newborn babies, and also could not ignore Miller's real-life controversies, and felt that the substantial presence of other characters had taken the film's focus away from establishing the Flash as an individual character. Reviewing the film for RogerEbert.com, Matt Zoller Seitz gave the film two-and-a-half out of four stars, summarizing his thoughts on the film as being "simultaneously thoughtful and clueless ... Like its sincere but often hapless hero, it keeps exceeding every expectation we might have for its competence only to instantly face-plant into the nearest wall". He felt that Miller's legal issues had undermined the film's comedy but credited Muschietti's direction and Hodson's writing for "taking its ideas and the pain of its characters seriously without devolving into glum, colorless machismo", enjoying how the film's science fiction elements allowed it to provide a positive ending for the character while also noting other scientific and philosophical issues "raised elsewhere". However, he felt Miller's dual role was executed well and commended the accompanying visual effects, but he heavily criticized the use of CGI to depict alternate realities.

The film's use of digital imagery to recreate the likenesses of deceased actors was criticized, with commentators questioning its ethical implications. Jack King from GQ expressed concerns that the use of actors such as Christopher Reeve and Adam West was "the next step in the normalization of a queasy, questionable trend in Hollywood, one in which actors are brought back from the grave using new computer techniques". Tim Burton, who directed the Batman films starring Keaton, expressed his distaste for Warner Bros. "misappropriat[ing]" his version of Batman and the film's reference to his unproduced film Superman Lives. Likewise, Reeve's children—Will, Matthew, and Alexandra Reeve Givens—were not consulted on the use of his likeness and did not watch the film. Reflecting on the film's reception in January 2025, Muschietti said the film failed critically and commercially because it did not appeal to the "four quadrants" of audience demographics: both men and women under and over the age of 25. He also stated that several audiences, especially women, did not care about the Flash character. Several commentators disagreed with Muschietti's reasoning, particularly citing the popularity of the CW television series The Flash (2014–2023).

=== Accolades ===
The Flash was nominated for Best Teaser at the 2022 Golden Trailer Awards. At the 51st Saturn Awards, it received nominations for Best Superhero Film and Best Supporting Actor in a Film for Keaton. The Flash won the Emerging Technology Award at the 22nd Visual Effects Society Awards for the development of "Volumetric Capture". Verdú won Best Female Performance in an International Production at the 32nd Actors and Actresses Union Awards.

== Future ==
By October 2022, a script for a sequel had been written by David Leslie Johnson-McGoldrick, who wrote the Aquaman films, in the event The Flash performed well. The script reportedly included Keaton's Batman and Calle's Supergirl. Warner Bros. was not expected to retain Miller for future films because of the actor's controversies and legal issues, although some Warner Bros. executives were open to continuing with Miller by January 2023, since they began treatment. Later that month, Gunn and Safran said there was potential for Miller to reprise their role in the new DCU franchise, but a decision on the character had not been made. Gunn confirmed that The Flash would reset the continuity of the DCEU and lead into the DCU's first film, Superman (2025). The Muschiettis intended for Miller to return for a potential sequel because they preferred the actor for the role, while the director also expressed interest in featuring Eobard Thawne / Reverse-Flash as an antagonist for a sequel after the character was responsible for Nora Allen's death in the film.

Ahead of The Flash's release in June 2023, TheWrap reported that a sequel was "on the table" with the potential for it to be greenlit being dependent on the film's box-office performance; The Flash needed to earn around the box-office gross of DC's The Batman ($770 million) for a sequel to move forward. The poor box-office performance of The Flash led many commentators to question and doubt the prospects of a sequel being made. Upon the film's release, DC Studios hired Muschietti to direct a new Batman film entitled The Brave and the Bold for the DCU. In October 2023, Variety reported that no actors from Zack Snyder's DCEU films, including Miller, would reprise their roles in the DCU.

== See also ==
- List of films featuring time loops
