= Supergirl in other media =

Adaptations of Supergirl in other media
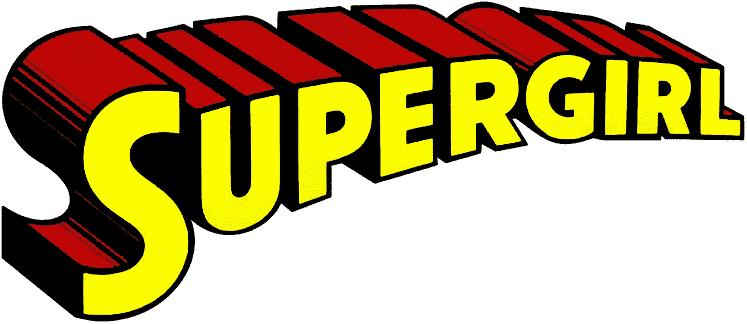
- Original source: Comics published by DC Comics
- First appearance: Action Comics #252 (May 1959)

Films and television
- Film(s): Supergirl (1984); The Flash (2023); Supergirl (2026); Man of Tomorrow (2027)
- Television show(s): Superman: The Animated Series (1996-2000); Smallville (2001-2011); Justice League Unlimited (2004-2006); Supergirl (2015-2021); DC Super Hero Girls (2019-2021); My Adventures with Superman (2023)

The superheroine Supergirl has been adapted into pop culture several times since 1984. This includes a feature film and several animated and live-action television programs.

== Film ==
=== Live-action ===
==== Supergirl (1984) ====
Helen Slater as Supergirl

A feature film adaptation Supergirl was released in 1984, starring Helen Slater in her first motion picture role. Supergirl was a spin-off from the popular 1978 film Superman, and Marc McClure reprises his role of Jimmy Olsen. The film performed poorly at the box office and failed to impress critics or audiences; Peter O'Toole received a Golden Raspberry Award nomination for Worst Actor for his performance, while Faye Dunaway received a Worst Actress nomination for hers. Prior to its release, Supergirl was expected to be the first film of a series, and Helen Slater had a contract for three films, but Supergirl's failure at the box office cancelled plans for a Supergirl II.

Supergirl was originally planned to appear in Superman III, in a treatment written by Ilya Salkind. In a departure from the comic source material, Supergirl was to be the surrogate daughter of Brainiac (who later is possessively in love with her) and later falls in love with Superman, who was to be planned to be portrayed as her lover instead of cousin.

==== DC Extended Universe ====
In 2018, a film centered around Kara Zor-El / Supergirl was in development with Oren Uziel penning the script. The studio intended to hire a female director, with Reed Morano—who has expressed interest in the project—being its top choice. Filming was expected to start production in early 2020, but the project was later abandoned.

==== The Flash (2023) ====
In the 2023 film The Flash, Sasha Calle portrayed the Kara Zor-El version of Supergirl in the Flashpoint timeline. In the reality where Barry Allen's mother Nora was not murdered, Kara Zor-El was sent from Krypton to look after her baby cousin Kal-El. However, General Zod intervened and Kal's ship never made it to Earth, while Kara was held captive in Siberia after arriving. Intending to find Clark, Barry rescues a depowered Kara instead. Exposed to yellow sunlight, she gains superpowers and allies with Barry, her world's Barry Allen, and Batman in the battle against Zod, who plans to xenoform Earth.

Zod then reveals that the Kryptonian Growth Codex was placed in her DNA instead of Kal-El's, who died in space. Supergirl battles Zod and is ultimately killed by him. The original ending had Kara surviving to the new timeline, which was changed following the merger of WB and Discovery, as well as James Gunn and Peter Safran taking over and rebooting the franchise. Kara's costume and looks are based on Lara Lane-Kent, from the Injustice universe. The version portrayed by Helen Slater also appeared in the film.

==== Supergirl (2026) ====
In January 2023, DC Studios co-chair and co-CEO James Gunn announced Supergirl (2026), a standalone film featuring the character Kara Zor-El / Supergirl. The film is derived from the comic book Supergirl: Woman of Tomorrow miniseries by writer Tom King and artist Bilquis Evely. Gunn described the project as "a big science fiction epic film" and said it would explore a more "hardcore" version of Supergirl than had been previously seen on screen. In November 2023, Ana Nogueira was hired to write the film's screenplay. She had previously been attached to write a Supergirl film in 2022 when it was being developed as a spin-off from The Flash. Gunn and Peter Safran enjoyed her work so much they had her return for the film under their direction and she signed an overall writing deal with DC to do so. Gunn confirmed Nogueira's involvement and called the film a "beautiful, star-spanning tale".

Kara Zor-El is first introduced in the film Superman (2025), portrayed by Milly Alcock. Intoxicated, she briefly returns to the Fortress of Solitude from a party in outer space. Kara leaves, taking Krypto with her. Supergirl will return in Man of Tomorrow.

=== Animations ===
==== Justice League: The New Frontier ====
Supergirl makes a cameo appearance in Justice League: The New Frontier.

==== Superman/Batman Apocalypse ====
Kara Zor-El appears in Superman/Batman: Apocalypse, voiced by Summer Glau. The film depicts her arrival on Earth and adjustment to life on the new planet. During the film, she is kidnapped and brainwashed by Darkseid before Superman frees her and takes her back to Earth.

==== Superman: Unbound ====
Molly Quinn voices Supergirl in Superman: Unbound, an adaptation of Superman: Brainiac. Kara and her parents narrowly escaped Kandor before it was shrunken and abducted by Brainiac, leaving her with PTSD. She arrived on Earth a few months before the film's beginning and is still adjusting to life on Earth and her cousin Superman being older than her due to the difference in how long their rockets spent in space. Kara prefers to use her powers to save people from dictators rather than fight ordinary criminals. Kara is greatly reluctant to face Brainiac again, even with super powers, but eventually summons the courage to help her cousin fight him.

==== Lego DC Comics Super Heroes: Justice League: Cosmic Clash ====
Supergirl appears in Lego DC Comics Super Heroes: Justice League: Cosmic Clash, voiced by Jessica DiCicco.

==== Teen Titans Go! To the Movies ====
Supergirl appears in Teen Titans Go! To the Movies, voiced by Meredith Salenger.

==== Legion of Super-Heroes ====
Meg Donnelly voices Kara Zor-El in Legion of Super-Heroes, a 2023 film set in the Tomorrowverse continuity. In the film, Supergirl is sent to the future by Superman to train with the Legion of Super-Heroes.

==== Justice League: Crisis on Infinite Earths – Part One ====
Kara Zor-El / Supergirl appears in Justice League: Crisis on Infinite Earths, a 2024 film set in the Tomorrowverse continuity, voiced again by Meg Donnelly. In this version, Kara Zor-El also becomes Harbinger.

== Television ==
=== Live-action ===
==== Smallville ====
Supergirl appears in Smallville, portrayed by Laura Vandervoort. Kara was sent from Krypton at the same time as was Kal-El to look after him, but was trapped under a dam during the first meteor shower and was in suspended animation for the past 18 years. Though chronologically older than Clark, she is younger than him due to her time in suspended animation leaves her.

Kara explains that Clark was not made aware of her existence because their respective fathers were not on good terms, exemplified by Jor-El's distrust when informed of her arrival by Clark. Martian Manhunter is similarly distrustful of her, as Kara is of him, claiming that Zor-El attempted to have Jor-El assassinated. In the episode "Lara", it is revealed the Martian Manhunter was correct about her father. Zor-El had tried to kill his brother out of the love he had for Jor-El's wife, Lara. Kara witnessed an incident where Zor-El attempted to force Lara to leave Jor-El and love him. Zor-El had erased her memories, causing her to believe he was a good man until now. Realizing she was wrong about her father, she puts her memories of him aside and remains with Clark on the farm.

==== Supergirl and Arrowverse ====
Melissa Benoist as Supergirl

A live-action Supergirl television series was developed in 2015. Executive producers for the series include Greg Berlanti (also a creator/producer for Arrow and The Flash), Ali Adler, who both wrote the script, and Berlanti Productions' Sarah Schechter. Titles under consideration for the series included Super and Girl. The series follows Kara Zor-El, who is taken in by the Danvers family when she was 12, after being sent away from Krypton. The Danvers teach her to be careful with her powers, until she has to reveal them during an unexpected disaster, setting her on her journey of heroism. Melissa Benoist was cast as Supergirl.

In the series, initially set on Earth-38 in the multiverse, Kara was sent to Earth to protect her cousin, Kal-El. Krypton's explosion knocked her ship off course into the Phantom Zone, remaining in stasis for twenty years while remaining her age until she reached Earth and was found by a full-grown Kal-El - know publicly as Superman. Kara spends her remaining teenage years with the Danvers family at Superman's suggestion, deciding to live a normal life while she and her adopted sister Alex move to National City. However, Kara was forced to reveal herself to save an crashing airplane and was later recruited by the Department of Extra-Normal Operations, a secret agency Alex works for. Kara helps the DEO chase down a number of alien criminals that Kara inadvertently helped escaped the Phantom Zone and later threats.

Benoist first appears outside her series in the second season of The Flash, later returning in the Arrowverse's 2016 multi-series crossover "Invasion!". When the Arrowverse Earth-1 is attacked by the alien Dominators, Barry Allen recruits Kara to help him and his Earth's heroes in opposing the invasion. After the battle concludes, Kara is given a device by Cisco Ramon that will allow her to travel back and forth to Earth-1, as well as call the other heroes for assistance if required.

Kara plays a key role in the 2017 crossover Crisis on Earth-X, where the Earth-X Oliver Queen seeks to capture Kara to transplant her heart into his wife and Kara's Earth-X counterpart, Overgirl, as she is dying from unintentionally overloading herself with solar energy. Kara manages to escape and participates in the final battle with Earth-1's heroes and Earth-X's forces. Kara later returns in the later crossovers Elseworlds and Crisis on Infinite Earths, with her Earth-38 incorporated into Earth-Prime at the end of the latter.

==== Peacemaker ====
The DC Universe version of Supergirl makes a cameo appearance in the TV show Peacemaker episode "The Ties That Grind".

=== Animations ===
==== DC Animated Universe ====
Supergirl appears in series set in the DC Animated Universe, voiced by Nicholle Tom.

===== Superman: The Animated Series =====
Character template of Supergirl for Superman: The Animated Series, art by Bruce Timm.

Supergirl is introduced in the Superman: The Animated Series two-part episode "Little Girl Lost". This version, named Kara In-Ze, is not related to Superman and is from Argo, a planet near Krypton that was knocked out of orbit following Krypton's destruction. Kara and her family were placed in suspended animation to survive the planet's gradually decreasing temperatures, but the stasis chambers failed over time, leaving her as the only survivor. Superman discovers Kara while searching for life in Krypton's solar system and brings her to Earth, where she is adopted by Jonathan and Martha Kent. Living in the peaceful Kansas countryside and reveling in her powers in the planet's yellow sun environment, Kara soon recovers from any grief and shock over her loss of her family upon revival and takes on the Supergirl moniker.

The second season was extended an extra two episodes to accommodate the episode "Little Girl Lost"; producer Bruce Timm said, "We actually had to steal two episodes from 'Batman'. They had a Supergirl toy coming from Kenner, so they allowed us to do those [episodes]." Bruce Timm and Paul Dini intended to use the original Supergirl, Kara Zor-El, but were denied by DC Comics, due to DC's then-present edict that Superman was to remain the only surviving Kryptonian.

===== Justice League =====
In "Hereafter", Kara makes a cameo appearance at Superman's funeral, alongside Jonathan and Martha Kent. In "Comfort and Joy", Kara appears in a photograph and is mentioned to be away from home skiing with Barbara Gordon.

===== Justice League Unlimited =====
Supergirl appears in Justice League Unlimited as a member of the Justice League. It is revealed that, during the events of the Superman: The Animated Series series finale "Legacy", scientists from Project Cadmus acquired some of Supergirl's DNA and went on to create Galatea, a clone of Supergirl who visually resembles Power Girl.

In "Far From Home", Supergirl, along with Green Lantern and Green Arrow, are transported to the 31st century by Legion of Super-Heroes members Brainiac 5 and Bouncing Boy to aid them in defeating the Fatal Five, who have mind controlled the rest of the Legion. However, Brainiac 5 tells Green Lantern and Green Arrow that 31st century history says that Supergirl never returned to her own time, which he assumes to mean that she will die while on this mission. As Kara experiences the technology and society of the future, which is similar to that of her lost homeworld, she becomes conflicted about returning to the past, where she has never felt that she fits in. Kara and Brainiac 5 develop romantic feelings for each other, and when Green Lantern and Green Arrow prepare to return to the past, she tells them that history will be fulfilled since she is staying in the future as a member of the Legion.

Supergirl also appears in the Justice League Unlimited tie-in comics.

==== Smallville Legends: Kara and the Chronicles of Krypton ====
Kara and the Chronicles of Krypton is the fourth set of videos of the Smallville Legends web series. In these animated shorts, Kara is seen during the Kryptonian civil war which led eventually to her planet's destruction. She is the daughter of Zor-El and lives in the city of Kandor, in contrast to previous versions of the character who lived in Argo. Zor-El is a prominent figure in the war and Kara is in the middle of the chaos. The webisodes are featured on the Smallville Complete Season 7 DVD set as a bonus feature.

==== Super Best Friends Forever ====
The process of the design of Supergirl. 2012 (left), 2016 (middle), 2019/2018 (right)

Supergirl appears alongside Batgirl and Wonder Girl in Super Best Friends Forever, a series of shorts developed by Lauren Faust for the DC Nation block on Cartoon Network. She is voiced by Nicole Sullivan.

==== DC Super Hero Girls ====
Supergirl appears as a central protagonist in the web series DC Super Hero Girls, voiced by Anais Fairweather. This version is a student at Super Hero High.

She also appears as a central protagonist in the 2019 TV series, with Nicole Sullivan reprising her role from the Super Best Friends Forever shorts.

==== Justice League Action ====
Supergirl appears in Justice League Action, voiced by Joanne Spracklen.

==== Young Justice ====
Supergirl makes a non-speaking appearance in the Young Justice season 4 finale "Death and Rebirth". This version is a prisoner of the Phantom Zone who was rescued by the Light and recruited into the Female Furies.

==== Harley Quinn ====
Supergirl appears in the Harley Quinn episode "Getting Ice Dick, Don't Wait Up", voiced by Lacey Chabert. This version is an ophthalmologist.

==== My Adventures with Superman ====
Supergirl appears in My Adventures with Superman, voiced by Kiana Madeira. This version is initially a warrior for the Kryptonian empire and brainwashed servant of Brainiac, who she believes is her father. Following encounters with Jimmy Olsen, Superman, and Lois Lane, she eventually breaks free of Brainiac's control.

== Video games ==
- Supergirl appears as an unlockable character in the PSP version of Justice League Heroes, voiced by Tara Strong.
- Supergirl appears in DC Universe Online, voiced by Adriene Mishler.
- Supergirl appears as a playable character in Lego Batman 2: DC Super Heroes, voiced by Bridget Hoffman.
- Supergirl makes a cameo appearance in the IOS version of Injustice: Gods Among Us as a support card.
- Supergirl appears as a playable character in Lego Batman 3: Beyond Gotham, voiced by Kari Wahlgren.
- Supergirl appears as a playable character in Infinite Crisis, voiced by Camilla Luddington, with the Arcane Supergirl voiced by India de Beaufort.
- Supergirl appears as a playable character in Injustice 2, voiced by Laura Bailey. This version was found by Black Adam after being sent away from Krypton. She was trained by Adam and Wonder Woman into perfecting her powers as they tell her stories of her cousin, inspiring her to become Supergirl.
- Supergirl appears as a playable character in Lego Dimensions via a limited-distribution minifigure, with Kari Wahlgren reprising her role.
- Supergirl appears as a playable character in the DC TV Super-Heroes DLC pack in Lego DC Super-Villains.

== Music ==
- The song "That's Really Super, Supergirl" appears on the alternative rock/psychedelic band XTC's album Skylarking (1986, Geffen Records).
- Pop singer Krystal Harris sings a song "Supergirl" that appears on the soundtrack of the Disney film The Princess Diaries.
- Pop singer Jessica Simpson's song "With You" includes the lyrics, "I wish I could save the world, like I was Supergirl!".
- Saving Jane released an album, SuperGirl, which included a song of the same name in 2008.
- The song "Supergirl" is written by Robbie Gennet. John Cougar Mellencamp, Hilary Duff, Reamonn and Papaya have also recorded different songs called "Supergirl". The Gin Blossoms recorded a song titled "Super Girl" for their 2006 album Major Lodge Victory. Multiple references are made to flight and other super powers.
- The song "Super Sexy Woman", appearing on the 2000 album A Sun Came by Sufjan Stevens, is about Supergirl, explicitly referencing "Superman's cousin."
- The musician Donovan recorded a song called "Superlungs (My Supergirl)". It appears on the album Barabajagal, as well as in alternate version bonus tracks on the remastered CD releases of Sunshine Superman and Mellow Yellow.
- "Supergirl" is a pop song recorded by Hilary Duff for her fourth album, Most Wanted (2005). It is exclusive to the Collector's Edition of the album and was released as the third single in 2006 in the United States, and was written by Kara DioGuardi and Greg Wells.
- "Supergirl" is the name of a song and album released by pop/R&B singer Angela Via in 2007.
- Norwegian rock band Minor Majority have a song named "Supergirl".
- Christina Aguilera's song "Keeps Getting Better" contains the lyrics "Next day I'm your Supergirl out to save the world" as part of the chorus.
- "Supergirl" is Suzie McNeil's 4th single from her album Rock-n-Roller released in 2009.
- Graham Bonney had a hit in the UK, Germany and elsewhere with "Supergirl" in 1966.

== Literature ==
In Larry Niven's essay "Man of Steel, Woman of Kleenex", he speculated on Supergirl being used as the surrogate mother for a child of Superman and Lois Lane to preserve the Kryptonian race.
