= Shawn Levy's unrealized projects =

Film projects

During his long career, Canadian and American filmmaker Shawn Levy has worked on several projects which never progressed beyond the pre-production stage under his direction. Some of these projects fell in development hell, were officially canceled or would see life under a different production team.

== 2000s ==
=== Zits ===
In July 2002, it was reported that Levy would direct the film adaptation of the comic strip Zits for Universal Pictures, with Adam 'Tex' Davis hired to write the screenplay.

=== Fever Pitch ===
By August 24, 2002, Levy was attached to direct a Boston-set film adaptation of author Nick Hornby's book Fever Pitch (1992), which had previously been adapted by Hornby (who would also serve as executive producer) into a 1997 British film of the same name, which Levy's film would also serve as a remake of. Gwyneth Paltrow was approached to play the female lead, but ultimately rejected the role as she found the script mediocre. On May 13, 2003, Brian Robbins signed on to direct the project, replacing Levy. The film was ultimately directed by the Farrelly brothers and would star Drew Barrymore and Jimmy Fallon.

=== Overtime ===
On January 16, 2003, it was announced that Levy would direct the sports film Overtime, written by Sheldon Turner, for Warner Bros. Pictures, and would reunite with his Just Married star Ashton Kutcher on the project.

=== The Wonder Twins ===
On June 9, 2003,

=== Father Knows Less ===
On September 27, 2004, it was announced that Levy would direct the comedy Father Knows Less for New Line Cinema, based on a pitch by Aline Brosh McKenna. It was reported that Levy would be paid $5 million up front against 5% of the gross. On March 27, 2005, it was reported that Dustin Hoffman was final negotiations to play the lead role in the film.

=== 21 ===
On September 1, 2005, it was announced that Levy had been offered a pay-or-play deal by Sony Pictures to direct 21, after original director Brett Ratner departed the project to direct X-Men: The Last Stand. The film, produced by Kevin Spacey's Trigger Street Productions, would eventually be directed by Robert Luketic with Spacey starring.

=== Me, Me, Me ===
On April 18, 2006, it was reported that New Line Cinema had acquired the comedy pitch Me, Me, Me by Jimmy Rosenthal, and had set Levy and his 21 Laps Entertainment to produce the project, with the project being developed as a potential directing vehicle.

=== The Talent Thief ===
On November 27, 2006, Levy was set to direct a film adaptation of the Alex Williams fantasy novel The Talent Thief for Universal Pictures, with Levy producing through his 21 Laps Entertainment company and Matt Manfredi and Phil Hay writing the screenplay.

=== Father Figure ===
Also on November 27, 2006, it was reported that Levy's 21 Laps Entertainment had signed a deal with 20th Century Fox to produce the original comedy drama Father Figure, written by Mark Friedman. On November 14, 2007, it was announced that Levy would direct the film as well, with Tom McCarthy performing rewrites.

=== The Institution TV pilot ===
In addition to The Talent Thief and Father Figure, 21 Laps Entertainment reportedly set up a Fox network deal for the pilot script The Institution, a single-camera half-hour series from Levy and Chris Moynihan that focuses on three couples as they weather the highs and lows of matrimony.

=== The Swim Team TV pilot ===
Another Levy project announced to be in development in November 2006 was the sitcom The Swim Team, created by Rich Appel, for CBS.

=== The Flash ===
On February 5, 2007, it was announced that Levy would direct superhero film The Flash for Warner Bros. Pictures and producers Charles Roven and Alex Gartner; Levy replaced David S. Goyer, who had been attached to write and direct the film but had dropped out several months before, with elements of Goyer's script expected to be retained while Levy oversaw the writing of a new script. In October 2007, Levy left the project, which led to David Dobkin retooling the project as a spinoff of George Miller's canceled Justice League: Mortal film. In September 2011, Levy told Collider that he had overseen development of a draft on the film for three and a half months, but eventually felt he needed to do more films first before taking on such a project, stating: "I was still the family comedy guy. And I just felt like, I gotta get a few more under my belt before I can claim the legitimacy of making a movie like that." Levy would add in July 2024 that he frequently gets offered IP-related projects but usually rejects them as "I need to feel that I see a story worth telling". A film centered on the Flash character was ultimately produced as part of the DC Extended Universe (DCEU), with Andy Muschietti as the director. The film was released in theatres by Warner Bros. on June 16, 2023.

=== The Hardy Men ===
Also on February 5, 2007, it was reported that Levy would direct Ben Stiller and Tom Cruise in The Hardy Men for 20th Century Fox, a buddy action comedy based on The Hardy Boys mystery novels, and centered on the adult versions of the brothers as they solve a new mystery. Simon Kinberg was hired to overhaul the film's screenplay in April, with the project expected to begin production in January 2008. In February 2009, it was announced that Ed Solomon would rewrite the script. In September 2011, Levy said he had still not been able to "crack" the script, and described the project as his "long-gestating tragedy".

=== The Seems ===
On April 16, 2007, it was announced that Levy would direct and produce the fantasy film The Seems for 20th Century Fox, based on the novel by John Hulme and Michael Wexler, who would also write the screenplay for the project.

=== The Way Back ===
On April 30, 2007, it was announced Levy would direct the coming-of-age comedy-drama The Way Back, written by Jim Rash and Nat Faxon, for Fox Searchlight Pictures, with production expected to begin in mid-June. However, by July 21, 2008, it was reported that the project had moved to Mandate Pictures, and that Levy would only serve as producer instead. Screenwriters Rash and Faxon would eventually direct the project themselves, which was ultimately retitled The Way, Way Back and released in theatres on July 5, 2013.

=== The Ten Best Days of My Life ===
On December 4, 2008, it was announced that Levy would produce the feature film adaptation of the Adena Halpern novel The Ten Best Days of My Life alongside Amy Adams for 20th Century Fox, with Adams also set to star in the project and Levy potentially directing. Levy discussed the project in February 2012, stating that he and Adams were looking to find the right screenplay for the project before moving forward with it.

=== Neighborhood Watch ===
On September 12, 2008, it was announced Levy's 21 Laps Entertainment would set up the comedy Neighborhood Watch for 20th Century Fox, with the project being developed as a potential directing vehicle for Levy. The film was ultimately directed by Akiva Schaeffer and released on July 27, 2012 as The Watch, with Levy serving as a producer.

=== How to Talk to Girls ===
On January 22, 2009, it was reported that Levy would produce the film adaptation of Alec Greven's book How to Talk to Girls for 20th Century Fox, and would develop the project as a potential directing vehicle. However, on February 22, 2012, Levy declared the project was "not for me to direct".

== 2010s ==
=== The Deadliest Warrior ===
On September 16, 2010, it was announced that Levy would produce a feature film based on the Spike TV television series Deadliest Warrior for Paramount Pictures, and was also eyeing the project as a potential directing vehicle. On January 20, 2011, it was announced that J. D. Payne and Patrick McKay were hired to write the screenplay. In February 2012, Levy told Collider that a script had just been turned in to Paramount, and that he would likely only serve as producer, though he also expressed hope that the film could enter production that year.

=== Untitled action adventure film ===
On February 3, 2011, it was announced that 20th Century Fox had acquired an original action adventure pitch by Carlton Cuse for Hugh Jackman to star and Levy to produce and direct. On February 22, Levy said that "Carlton came in and he pitched me a crazy, wildly imaginative adventure thriller, and I heard it and I'm like 'That's a big movie' and I took it to Hugh, and then Carlton told Hugh the idea and Hugh's like 'I'm in'." Levy also stated that he had "high hopes" for the project, having given Cuse notes to work from for another draft of the script.

=== Fantastic Voyage remake ===
On February 7, 2011, it was announced that Levy had been selected to direct a remake of the science fiction film Fantastic Voyage (1966) by producer James Cameron and 20th Century Fox, with Laeta Kalogridis polishing a screenplay by Shane Salerno; Levy was to have replaced Paul Greengrass. In February 2012, Levy said the project was more difficult to move forward, but reiterated his intentions to direct it. On January 7, 2016, it was announced that Guillermo del Toro would be taking over as director, with David S. Goyer now writing the screenplay.

=== Home Movies ===
On June 7, 2011, it was announced that Tom McCarthy would rewrite the screenplay for Home Movies, a supernatural comedy drama being produced by Levy's 21 Laps Entertainment for DreamWorks Pictures, from initial drafts by Jared Stern. By February 20, 2012, McCarthy was still in the process of rewriting the script for Levy and DreamWorks; Levy described the project as "a really interesting blend of a big, high-concept Hollywood-y idea, 'What if you could re-live your home movies?', but with Tom McCarthy's voice and specificity of characters."

=== Frankenstein ===
On August 24, 2011, it was announced that Levy was entering talks with 20th Century Fox to direct a new film based on Frankenstein, from a screenplay by Max Landis. In February 2012, during an interview with Collider, Levy described the project as being more difficult to move forward due to complexities surrounding casting, scripting, and its larger budget. The project would eventually be directed by Paul McGuigan and released on November 25, 2015, as Victor Frankenstein, with Levy ultimately uninvolved.

=== The Three Misfortunes of Geppetto ===
On October 14, 2011, it was announced that 20th Century Fox had acquired the spec script The Three Misfortunes of Geppetto, a prequel to The Adventures of Pinocchio written by Mike Vukadinovich centered around Geppetto, as a directing vehicle for Levy. On February 24, 2012, during an interview with Collider, Levy stated that he did not know if he would direct the project himself, and that he had met with other directors about the project.

=== The Cannonball Run reboot ===
On October 18, 2011, it was reported that Levy had expressed interest in directing a reboot of The Cannonball Run for Warner Bros. Pictures to star Ben Stiller; Guy Ritchie was also reported to have entered talks with the studio about directing the project. On February 24, 2012, Levy confirmed he had been interested in two years prior, and had discussed the project with original producer Albert S. Ruddy with plans to cast Stiller and Owen Wilson, but that it was not something he was now involved in. On March 15, 2016, it was reported that Etan Cohen had been hired to write and direct the reboot, titled Cannonball, with Andre Morgan and Alan Gasner set to produce, until June 4, 2018, when Doug Liman was offered to direct the reboot.

=== The 39 Clues ===
On May 10, 2012, it was announced that Levy would direct an adaptation of The 39 Clues series of novels for DreamWorks Pictures, from a screenplay by Jeff Nathanson. On August 20, 2013, it was announced that Universal Pictures were in talks to acquire the rights to the series out of turnaround from DreamWorks, with Levy not involved.

=== Sesame Street ===
On June 19, 2012, it was announced that a new Sesame Street film was in the works at 20th Century Fox to be produced by Levy, Michael Aguilar, Mark Gordon, and Guymon Casady with a script by head Sesame Street writer Joey Mazzarino. In 2015, it was announced that the film had moved to Warner Bros. Pictures with Levy directing. In April 2016, Levy left the directing position to focus on directing a remake of Starman. In November 2016, it was announced that David Guion and Michael Handelman had been set to co-write the screenplay treatment for the film after Mazzarino left the project, with Levy of 21 Laps Entertainment, Aguilar, Casady and Daniel Rappaport of Entertainment 360 still attached to produce, alongside Sesame Workshop. In September 2018, Jonathan Krisel signed on to direct the film, with Chris Galletta set to write the screenplay from a previous draft by Mike Rosolio. In December 2018, it was announced that Anne Hathaway was being considered for the role of Sally Hawthorne in the film, which was confirmed in February 2019. In March 2020, Chance the Rapper was added to the cast playing the Mayor's aide. Filming was originally scheduled to begin in July 2019, but due to Hathaway finishing up on the set of The Witches (which wrapped filming in September 2019), filming was delayed to April 2020. Due to the COVID-19 pandemic, production was canceled.

=== Aloha ===
On July 20, 2012, it was reported that Levy would direct and produce the Hawaii-set comedy Aloha, written by Nicholas Stoller, for 20th Century Fox, with Ben Stiller and Jonah Hill starring in the project and co-producing with Levy. By December 2014, Levy revealed that the project, now titled Why Him?, had been rewritten by John Hamburg, who would also direct and was in the process of casting the film. The film was released in theatres by Fox on December 23, 2016.

=== City That Sailed ===
On November 14, 2013, it was announced that Levy would direct the adventure film City That Sailed for 20th Century Fox, with Audrey Wells writing the screenplay and Will Smith starring. In 2014, he reiterated his intent to direct the film after leaving the production of the Minecraft film.

=== Minecraft ===
On October 16, 2014, it was announced that Levy would direct Minecraft, a film adaptation of the video game by Mojang Studios, for Warner Bros. Pictures, with Roy Lee and Jill Messick producing. On December 9, it was announced that Levy had departed the project, along with writers Kieran and Michele Mulroney, due to creative differences. The film was ultimately directed by Jared Hess and was released in theatres on April 4, 2025.

=== 40 Thieves ===
On November 12, 2014, it was announced that Levy would direct the adventure film 40 Thieves for 20th Century Fox, from a screenplay by Jayson Rothwell and based on the classic story "Ali Baba and the Forty Thieves". On December 9, it was reported that the film was one of several projects Levy was considering next after departing Minecraft, but a few days later Levy described the project as a "maybe".

=== Untitled Tinker Bell film ===
On November 19, 2014, it was announced that Fox had acquired an untitled Tinker Bell comedy for Levy to direct, with Melissa McCarthy set to star in the title role from a screenplay by Nicholas Stoller and producing alongside Levy. In December, it was reported that Levy was considering the project as his next film after departing from Minecraft, but a few days later Levy stated that he did not know if it would be his next film; he also described the project as "a subversive, revisionist tale".

=== Steelheart ===
On July 22, 2015, it was announced that 20th Century Fox had set Carter Blanchard to adapt the Brandon Sanderson 2013 novel Steelheart, the first installment in The Reckoners series, as a potential directing vehicle for Levy. In August 2021, during an interview with Collider, Levy confirmed there had been no movement on the project and added that it was unlikely to see any movement in the future, calling the project "dead".

=== Untitled Bill Graham biopic ===
On February 17, 2016, it was announced that Levy would direct a biographical film about music promoter Bill Graham for 20th Century Fox, based on the autobiography Bill Graham: My Life Inside Rock and Out that Graham co-wrote with Robert Greenfield. On January 5, 2017, it was announced that Zach Dean would write the screenplay for the film.

=== Starman remake ===
On April 1, 2016, it was announced that Levy would direct a remake of the John Carpenter film Starman (1984) for Sony Pictures, with Arash Amel writing the screenplay; Levy would also produce the remake alongside Michael Douglas, who had also produced the original film. In August 2021, Levy stated that the project was "far horizon, or you could say unlikely", as he had not found a draft he felt was worthy enough of remaking the title.

=== Uncharted ===
On October 25, 2016, it was announced that Levy would direct the action adventure film Uncharted, based on the video game series of the same name, for Sony Pictures, with Joe Carnahan writing the most recent draft of the screenplay. On May 22, 2017, it was announced Tom Holland had been cast as Nathan Drake, with the film being reconfigured to serve as a prequel to the games. Rafe Judkins was rewriting the script by January 2018, with producer Charles Roven describing the film as an "origin story". On December 19, 2018, it was announced Levy had departed the film in order to prioritize working on Free Guy. The film was eventually directed by Ruben Fleischer and released in theatres on February 18, 2022.

=== The Fall ===
On May 17, 2017, it was announced that Levy would direct and produce the science fiction film The Fall, written by Pete Bridges, for Amblin Partners.

=== Crater ===
On November 8, 2017, it was announced that Crater, a science fiction spec script by John Griffin, had been acquired by 20th Century Fox and that Levy was in negotiations to direct and produce the project. On January 12, 2021, it was announced that Kyle Patrick Alvarez would direct the project instead, with Levy only serving as a producer, with the film moving to a Disney+ release after the acquisition of 21st Century Fox by Disney. The film was released on Disney+ on May 12, 2023.

=== Be More Chill ===
On October 20, 2018, it was announced that Levy would co-produce a feature film based on the musical adaptation of Ned Vizzini's novel Be More Chill, with Greg Berlanti's company co-producing for 20th Century Fox. In August 2021, Levy confirmed that a script had been written for the project by the musical's creators, and that it was still in development.

== 2020s ==
=== Real Steel 2 ===
On August 8, 2021, Levy said that he wants to reunite with Hugh Jackman for a sequel to Real Steel, that would potentially co-star Ryan Reynolds. On January 13, 2022, it was announced that a series adaptation of Real Steel was in the early stages of development at Disney+, with Levy serving as executive producer alongside Robert Zemeckis, Jack Rapke, Jacqueline Levine, Susan Montford and Don Murphy.

=== Free Guy sequel ===
On August 14, 2021, following the successful first-day box-office gross of Free Guy, star Ryan Reynolds confirmed that Disney wanted to make a sequel. In September 2023, Levy said the story for the sequel was being revised in response to the film Barbie. Levy stated, "We are developing a sequel, but the truth is that you now have Barbie that has obviously left a mark about a character in a fictional world who comes to self-awareness. So, we're only gonna make Free Guy 2 if it's different than the first movie and if it's different from other movies."

=== Backwards ===
On February 9, 2022, it was announced that Levy would direct the science fiction film Backwards for Netflix, based on the short story by Julianna Baggott and Finneas Scott, with Levy's 21 Laps also producing the project alongside Safehouse Pictures, with Baggott also serving as an executive producer.

=== Boy Band ===
In February 2023, it was announced Levy would produce the comedy Boy Band for Paramount Pictures alongside Ryan Reynolds, who would also co-write and star in the project. Levy was confirmed as the film's director in February 2024.

=== Untitled heist comedy film ===
In December 2023, it was announced Levy would direct and produce an untitled heist comedy film for Netflix, with Ryan Reynolds set to star and co-produce.

=== Avengers 5 ===
While completing his work as director of Deadpool & Wolverine for Marvel Studios, Levy was approached to direct Avengers 5 in mid-March 2024. He turned down the offer due to scheduling concerns with his role as a director and executive producer on the fifth season of Stranger Things that would keep him busy until 2025. In July 2024, it was announced at the 2024 San Diego Comic-Con that the Russo brothers, who had previously directed Avengers: Infinity War (2018) and Avengers: Endgame (2019), would direct the film, which would be titled Avengers: Doomsday and is scheduled for release on December 18, 2026.

=== Untitled Reynolds/Jackman vehicle ===
Following the success of Deadpool & Wolverine, in November 2024, Ryan Reynolds announced that he was writing an untitled film that would star himself and Hugh Jackman and be directed by Levy.

=== Somewhere Out There ===
In May 2026, it was announced that Levy would direct the science fiction drama film Somewhere Out There, written by Max Taxe, for Netflix.

=== Days of Thunder sequel ===
Tom Cruise reportedly courted Levy to direct the untitled Days of Thunder sequel, but Levy chose to direct Ghost Rider (2028) instead.
