= Zach Dean =

American screenwriter

- Born: Traverse City, Michigan, U.S.
- Education: New York University
- Occupations: Screenwriter; producer
- Years active: 2012–present
- Known for: Deadfall; The Tomorrow War

Zach Dean is an American screenwriter and film producer, best known for writing the films Deadfall, The Tomorrow War, Fast X, and The Gorge.

== Early life ==
Dean is a Michigan native. He was born in Traverse City and grew up near Interlochen, attending Interlochen Arts Academy. He earned a master's in writing from New York University Tisch School of the Arts in 2005. Before selling his first script, he taught digital film production and screenwriting at Riverdale Country School in The Bronx. He has also worked as a bartender, carpenter, and casino dealer.

== Career ==
Dean's first produced screenplay was for the 2012 heist film Deadfall, directed by Stefan Ruzowitzky, and starring Eric Bana, Olivia Wilde, and Charlie Hunnam. In 2005, Dean was on JetBlue Flight 292 from Burbank to New York when the passengers were informed that the plane's landing gear had malfunctioned. As the plane circled around for hours, Dean contemplated his mortality and vowed to write a screenplay about family, which would become the script for Kin (later renamed Deadfall).

Dean wrote the 2017 sci-fi action thriller 24 Hours to Live, directed by Brian Smrz and starring Ethan Hawke. He wrote the sci-fi action time travel thriller The Tomorrow War (originally titled Ghost Draft), which is directed by Chris McKay and stars Chris Pratt, Yvonne Strahovski, J. K. Simmons, and Betty Gilpin. Originally scheduled to be released by Paramount Pictures, Amazon Studios acquired the rights to the film in a deal worth approximately $200 million, and release it on Prime Video on July 2, 2021.

Several of his screenplays have made The Black List survey of Hollywood's most-liked unproduced scripts. Beast, about a reformed criminal with a violent past, made the list in 2013. The World War II film Atlantic Wall, with Bradley Cooper attached to star and Gavin O'Connor to direct, made the list in 2015. Voyagers, a biopic for Warner Bros. Pictures which tells the love story of Carl Sagan and Ann Druyan, was on the 2016 Black List. The Gorge was on the 2020 Black List, and was purchased in 2020 by Skydance. In June 2024, Dean was revealed to have written the story treatment for Fast Forever. He was later announced to be taking over the screenwriting duties from Christina Hodson and Oren Uziel, until, Dean was replaced by Michael Lesslie in March 2026. Other yet-to-be-produced screenplays include the sci-fi film Canary, which was purchased in 2018 by Imagine Entertainment to be directed by Ron Howard; Methuselah, at Warner Bros., based on the character from the Old Testament; and the action-thriller Layover.

== Filmography ==
| Year | Title | Writer | Producer | Director |
|---|---|---|---|---|
| 2012 | Deadfall | Yes | No | Stefan Ruzowitzky |
| 2017 | 24 Hours to Live | Yes | No | Brian Smrz |
| 2021 | The Tomorrow War | Yes | No | Chris McKay |
| 2023 | Fast X | Story | No | Louis Leterrier |
| 2025 | The Gorge | Yes | Yes | Scott Derrickson |
| 2025 | Looking Through Water | Yes | No | Roberto Sneider |
| 2027 | Day Drinker | Yes | Yes | Marc Webb |
