= Smrz =

Smrz is a surname. Notable people with the surname include:

- Brian Smrz (born c. 1960), American stunt coordinator
- Jakub Smrž (born 1983), Czech motorcycle road racer
