= Balto (band) =

Alternative rock band

- Origin: Los Angeles, California, United States
- Genres: Indie rock, rock and roll Americana, psychedelic rock, indie folk, power pop, country rock
- Years active: 2010–present
- Members: Daniel Sheron; Adam Ditt; Tristan Leabu
- Website: baltotheband.com

Balto is an American alternative rock band from Los Angeles, California composed of singer-songwriter Daniel Sheron, Adam Ditt, and Tristan Leabu.

== History ==
Balto began in 2010 as loose collective of musicians in New York City, performing the songs of singer-songwriter Daniel Sheron. Recently returned from a failed attempt to begin a journalism career in Russia, Sheron gathered a number of friends from past musical projects and set out to record a group of songs written abroad over the previous year. This project resulted in the recording of Balto's debut album, October's Road, which Sheron self-released in early 2011.

Balto's early performances were largely confined to the Lower East Side of Manhattan and Brooklyn, and in the summer of 2011 the band embarked on its first national tour. Following the 2011 tour, Sheron relocated to Portland, Oregon and continued touring under the Balto name out of the Pacific Northwest.

Over the next two years he slowly established a permanent lineup in Portland, consisting of Seth Mower (Drums), Luke Beckel (Guitar), Devon Hoffner (Bass), and Adam Finger (Keyboards). This group would go on to record Call It By Its Name, a 7" released in 2015, as well as an LP – Strangers – released in 2017. During this period, Sheron embarked on two solo tours in Russia.

By early 2018, Sheron and Mower were living in Los Angeles, bringing on guitarist Carl Osterlof and Ben 'Bronco' Mower. 2018 also saw Sheron perform an extended series of solo performances in Central Europe, as well as the release of several singles and 7"’s – Songs For Viktor (7"), Bullshit Dream, & Black Snake Mojave Blues (7")and their selection to perform at SXSW 2019. In 2021, the band returned to touring with a lineup consisting of Sheron, Adam Ditt, and Tristan Leabu.

== Music and artistry ==
Balto's musical sound incorporates elements of American Rock’n’Roll, Americana, Psych Rock, and Classic R&B. What Youth Magazine described the band as "a blend of Americana, gospel, alt-country, and a speckle of psych." Rolling Stone writes of the band's 2018 release, Black Snake, Mojave Blues - "Sounding like the twisted soundtrack to some 1960s beach party movie, this punky garage-rocker skewers the hedonism and hollowness of Los Angeles."

== Discography ==
Studio Albums

- October's Road – 2011
- Strangers – 2017
- No Hard Feeling – 2024

EP's & 7" Releases

- Monuments (EP) – 2012
- Call It By Its Name (7") – 2015
- Songs For Viktor (7") – 2018
- Black Snake Mojave Blues/Still Don't Know (7") – 2018
- Magnet/Mind (7") – 2020

Music Videos

- Airplanes – 2013
- Born Astray – 2016
- Magnet/Mind – 2020
