= Tristan Lake Leabu =

American actor

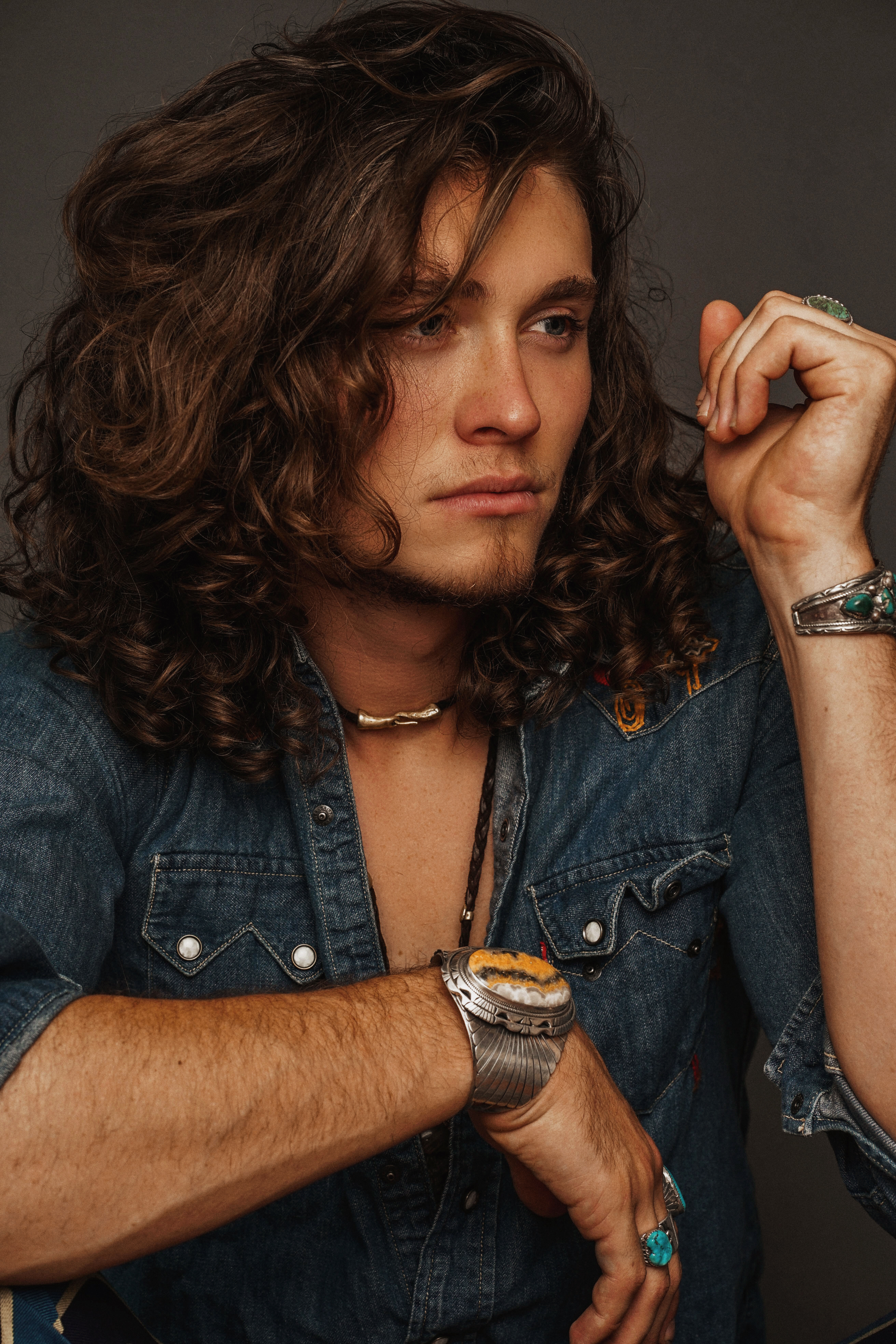
- Born: August 19, 1999 (age 27); Los Angeles, California, U.S.
- Occupations: Actor, Musician
- Years active: 2006–present

Tristan Lake Leabu (born August 19, 1999) is an American actor and musician. From 2016 to 2020, he portrayed the role of Reed Hellstrom on The Young and the Restless.

== Life and career ==
Leabu was born in Los Angeles, California, to Jeff Leabu and Jennifer Leabu. He has a younger sister, Aria Lyric Leabu, who is also an actor.

Leabu made his debut playing the part of Jason White, Lois Lane's son, in the 2006 film Superman Returns. For this performance he won a 2007 Young Artist Award for Best Performance in a Feature Film – Supporting Young Actor and was nominated for Best Performance by a Younger Actor at the 2007 Saturn Awards. He appeared in the 2007 Lifetime movie While the Children Sleep. He played Reed Hellstrom on The Young and the Restless. Leabu is a musician and member of the Los Angeles-based alternative rock band Balto.

== Filmography ==
Year	Title	Role	Notes
2006	Superman Returns	Jason White	
2007	While the Children Sleep	Max Eastman	TV Movie
2011	Chester	Jacob	Short
2012	Least Among Saints	Wade	
2012	Hawaii Five-0	Ethan Ewana	Season 3, Episode 11
2013	All American Christmas Carol	Harley	
2013	The Christmas Spirit	Christopher	TV Movie
2016–20	The Young and the Restless	Reed Hellstrom	Series regular
2020	The F**k-It List	Les	

== Awards and nominations ==
Year	Award	Category	Work	Result
2007	Saturn Award	Best Performance by a Younger Actor	Superman Returns	Nominated
2007	Young Artist Award	Best Performance in a Feature Film	Superman Returns	Won
2018	Daytime Emmy Award	Outstanding Younger Actor in a Drama Series	The Young and the Restless	Nominated
