= The Gorge (film) =

2025 film by Scott Derrickson

- Release poster
- Directed by: Scott Derrickson
- Written by: Zach Dean
- Produced by: David Ellison; Dana Goldberg; Don Granger; Scott Derrickson; C. Robert Cargill; Sherryl Clark; Adam Kolbrenner; Zach Dean; Gregory Goodman
- Starring: Miles Teller; Anya Taylor-Joy; Sigourney Weaver
- Cinematography: Dan Laustsen
- Edited by: Frédéric Thoraval
- Music by: Trent Reznor; Atticus Ross
- Production companies: Skydance Media; Crooked Highway
- Distributed by: Apple TV+ (under Apple Original Films)
- Release date: February 14, 2025
- Running time: 127 minutes
- Countries: United Kingdom; United States
- Languages: English; Lithuanian

The Gorge is a 2025 American science fiction romantic action horror film directed by Scott Derrickson and written by Zach Dean. The film stars Miles Teller, Anya Taylor-Joy, and Sigourney Weaver. Its plot follows two elite snipers who are ordered to guard a deep gorge without knowing what lies inside. The Gorge was released by Apple TV+ on February 14, 2025. It received mixed reviews from critics.

== Plot ==
Two elite snipers receive identical missions: guard opposite sides of a remote, top-secret gorge for a year without contact with their counterparts or the outside world. Levi Kane, a former U.S. Marine Scout/Sniper, is recruited by a mysterious woman named Bartholomew to guard the west tower. Drasa, a Lithuanian covert operative frequently employed by the Kremlin, guards the east tower. Levi suffers from PTSD-induced nightmares, while Drasa's terminally ill father Erikas plans to die by suicide on Valentine's Day.

Levi relieves his predecessor J.D., a former British Royal Marine corporal, who explains that the location is kept hidden by powerful cloaking antennas and the towers are armed to contain monstrous creatures within the gorge, nicknamed "The Hollow Men". J.D. warns of "Straydog", an unknown emergency protocol, and that battalions of soldiers sent into the gorge in the late 1940s never returned. Believing he is being exfiltrated after leaving the gorge, J.D. is instead killed on Bartholomew's orders after being picked up by helicopter.

After several uneventful months, Drasa violates the no-communication protocol on her birthday, engaging Levi in conversation via written signs and a sharpshooting competition. A wave of Hollow Men attempt to climb out of the gorge, but Drasa and Levi use their rifles, automated turrets, and mines to defend their towers and each other. As time goes on, they bond from afar.

Six months into their posting, Levi ziplines across the gorge to have dinner with Drasa. They spend a romantic night together, and he reveals he is writing a poem for her. The next morning, as Levi returns to his tower, his cable snaps when mines are detonated by Hollow Men, forcing him to parachute into the gorge. Arming herself, Drasa parachutes after him.

The pair discover that all plant and animal life within the gorge has been cross-mutated, including the Hollow Men, revealed to be the missing soldiers from decades past. Fighting off the hostile lifeforms, Drasa and Levi find the source of the mutations: a World War II bioweapons research lab abandoned after an earthquake caused a contaminant leak that produces symptoms within five days. The facility has since been maintained by Darklake, a private defense corporation extracting hybrid samples in hopes of creating super soldiers.

Drasa and Levi discover Straydog is the original fail-safe protocol to sterilize the site with a nuclear explosion. They find a working Jeep with a towing winch, using it to climb out of the gorge as they fight off the Hollow Men, and agree to separate for five days to ensure they are not infected with the mutagens. During Levi's monthly radio check-in, Bartholomew reveals that she works for Darklake and questions him about an access to their computer systems in the area. Levi denies it and Bartholomew orders him to kill Drasa since she's the only other person there that could have accessed it. Bartholomew, already aware that both Levi and Drasa have discovered the truth, dispatches a team to eliminate them.

Bartholomew and her men arrive to find the towers abandoned. Drasa and Levi shoots down the armed drones sent after them, and destroy the cloaking antennas. This exposes the site to surveillance and triggers the Straydog's protocol. Bartholomew and her men are killed in the blast, and the area is destroyed, while Drasa is separated from Levi and completes her five-day self-quarantine.

She reaches France to rendezvous with Levi, who does not appear, and discovers that he left her the completed poem in an envelope marked "If I don't make it, open at sunset." Some time later, Drasa has begun a new life as a waitress in a local restaurant. She is surprised by Levi, who says he was delayed by an injury, and they embrace and kiss.

== Cast ==
- Miles Teller as Levi Kane
- Anya Taylor-Joy as Drasa
- Sigourney Weaver as Bartholomew
- Sope Dirisu as Jasper "J.D." Drake
- William Houston as Erikas
- Ruta Gedmintas as WWII Scientist

== Production ==
Zach Dean wrote a spec script for The Gorge that was later voted onto the Black List of the most-liked unproduced screenplays in 2020. In March 2022, Scott Derrickson was set to direct and produce the film alongside Skydance Media. In August, Miles Teller was cast to star, as well as serve as an executive producer. In October, Anya Taylor-Joy joined the cast, and Apple Original Films signed on. Sigourney Weaver was added to the cast in March 2023.

The film includes a scene where the characters bond across the gorge, with the two playing chess and banging on improvised drum sets, recalling breakout roles of the actors: Taylor-Joy as a chess prodigy in The Queen's Gambit (2020) and Teller as a drummer in Whiplash (2014). Teller and Taylor-Joy have said that the scenes were written before they were cast, that they felt the scenes were a bit on the nose and tried to get them changed, and that Derrickson insisted the scene remain.

Filming began in March 2023 in London, with production at Warner Bros. Studios, Leavesden, where the tower interiors were built on a stage. The Rauma River in Norway served as the location for the forest and gorge exteriors, while Llandudno in Wales stood in for Èze in France. Visual effects were done by DNEG and Framestore with production VFX supervisor Erik Norby. Trent Reznor and Atticus Ross composed the score.

== Release ==
The Gorge had its world premiere at the AMC Theatres at The Grove in Los Angeles on February 13, 2025, with the cast and crew in attendance. The film was subsequently released for streaming exclusively on Apple TV+ on February 14, 2025. It became Apple TV+'s biggest launch for a movie ever, surpassing Wolfs starring George Clooney and Brad Pitt.

== Reception ==
On the review aggregator website Rotten Tomatoes, 62% of 149 critics' reviews are positive, with an average rating of 5.9/10. The website's consensus reads: "Mixing multiple genres, The Gorge makes for a surprisingly endearing romance until its action-thriller obligations steer proceedings back onto a more predictable path." Metacritic, which uses a weighted average, assigned the film a score of 57 out of 100, based on 29 critics, indicating "mixed or average" reviews.

Glenn Kenny of The New York Times gave The Gorge a positive review, saying: "The Gorge takes an already implausible premise and then catapults it out of the espionage genre and into science-fiction and horror ... this movie crackles most as a lively pas de deux between Taylor-Joy and Teller, who commendably take their material seriously no matter how seriously ridiculous it gets." The Daily Telegraph's Tim Robey gave it four out of five stars, writing: "What The Gorge does supply is a novel science-fiction premise and some captivating bursts of suspense. There was potential for this mysterious action romp to be something more special – a keeper, even. But we'll take what we can get". IGN's A. A. Dowd gave it a score of seven out of ten, saying: "Even when The Gorge disappears into generic run-and-shoot action, it benefits from the colorful confidence of Derrickson's staging and a '50s-inflected sci-fi score from Trent Reznor and Atticus Ross."

Jack Coyle of the Associated Press gave the film one and a half stars out of four, calling it "preposterous", arguing that the tonal swings between action and romance were not of high quality, with the movie feeling like an "intriguing but empty genre mash-up and streaming-only exercise". Coyle also took issue with the basic structure of the plot, arguing that "If some version of hell was pried open, would we, perhaps, want more than two guards?" The Guardian's Benjamin Lee gave it two out of five stars, writing: "Despite looking like it was based on a video game that your younger brother obsessively plays, The Gorge is in fact an original, or whatever that word means when the plot and aesthetic feel like they've been stitched together from so many other films." Samantha Puc of The Mary Sue wrote: "Had The Gorge stuck more strictly to the romance, it would overall be a much better film. Unfortunately, once Levi and Drasa become physically intimate, the movie pivots to a strict action-thriller and becomes almost distressingly predictable."

=== Accolades ===
Award	Date of ceremony	Category	Recipient(s)	Result	Ref.
Astra TV Awards	June 10, 2025	Best Television Movie	The Gorge	Nominated	
Astra TV Awards	June 10, 2025	Best Actor in a Limited Series or TV Movie	Miles Teller	Nominated	
Astra TV Awards	June 10, 2025	Best Actress in a Limited Series or TV Movie	Anya Taylor-Joy	Nominated	
Astra TV Awards	June 10, 2025	Best Directing in a Limited Series or TV Movie	Scott Derrickson	Nominated	
Critics' Choice Super Awards	August 7, 2025	Best Actor in a Science Fiction/Fantasy Movie	Miles Teller	Nominated	
Primetime Creative Arts Emmy Awards	September 6–7, 2025	Outstanding Television Movie	Miles Teller, David Ellison, Dana Goldberg, Don Granger, Scott Derrickson, C. Robert Cargill, Sherryl Clark, Adam Kolbrenner, Zach Dean, and Gregory Goodman	Nominated	
Primetime Creative Arts Emmy Awards	September 6–7, 2025	Outstanding Sound Editing for a Limited or Anthology Series, Movie or Special	Ethan Van der Ryn, Erik Aadahl, Paul Hackner, Darren Maynard, David Farmer, Frederic Dubois, David V. Butler, Stephanie Brown, Jonathan Greasley, Jason W. Jennings, Nolan McNaughton, and Sally Boldt	Nominated	
Critics' Choice Television Awards	January 4, 2026	Best Television Movie/Miniseries	The Gorge	Nominated	
Visual Effects Society Awards	February 25, 2026	Outstanding Environment in a Photoreal Feature	Daniel James Cox, Yosuke Inomata, Clint Rea, Gabriel Pires (For "The Bodyweb")	Nominated	
