= JetBlue Flight 292 =

2005 aviation incident in California

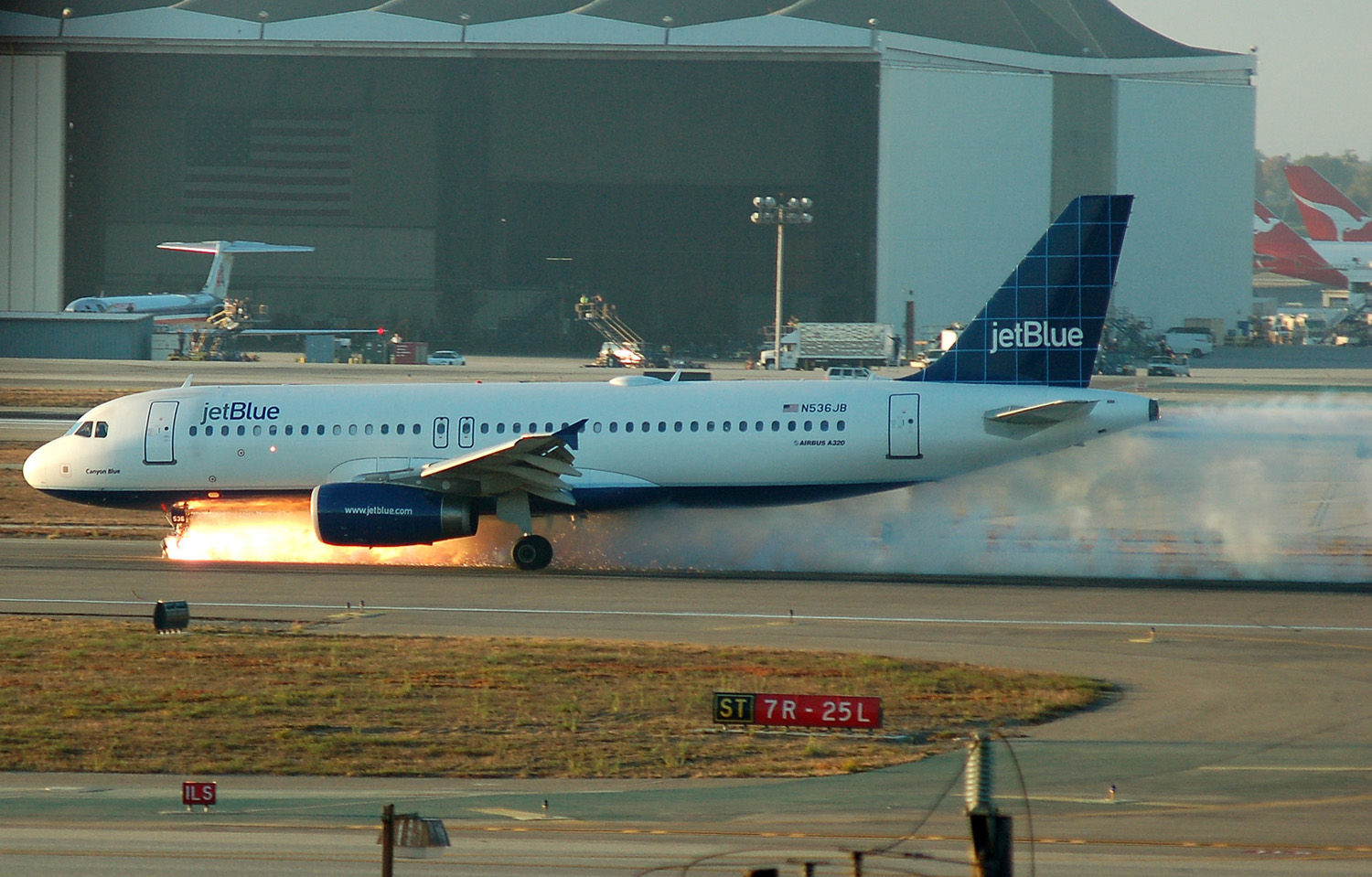
- The aircraft making an emergency landing, with its malfunctioned nose gear in flames

Incident
- Date: September 21, 2005
- Summary: Emergency landing following a front landing gear malfunction
- Site: Los Angeles Int'l Airport; 33°56′09″N 118°23′50″W

Aircraft
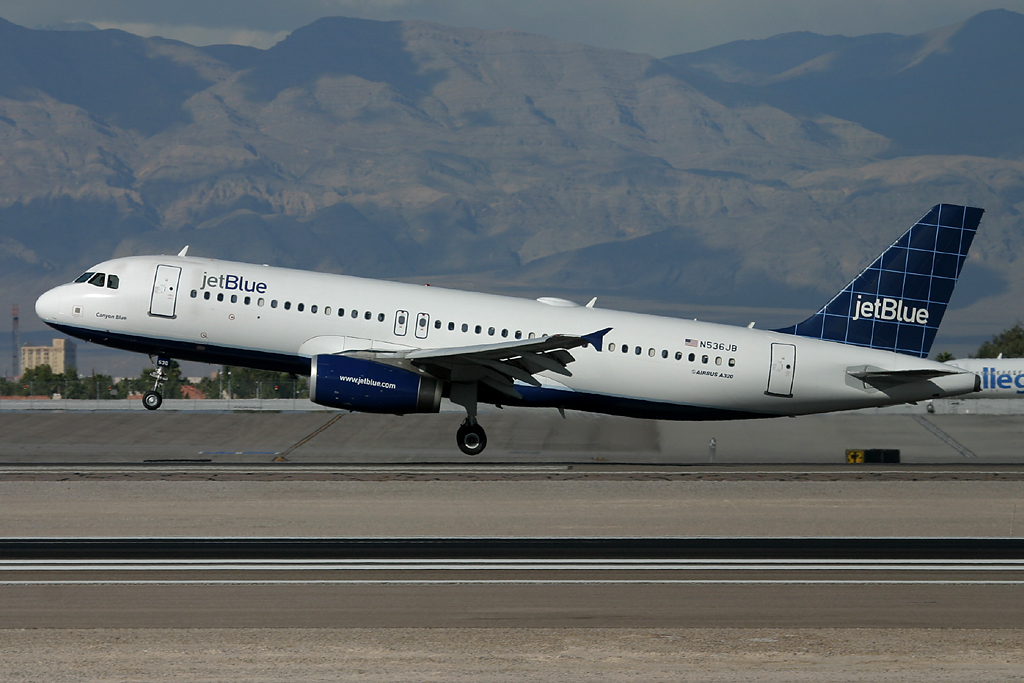
- N536JB, the aircraft involved in the incident, seen in 2004
- Aircraft type: Airbus A320-232
- Aircraft name: Canyon Blue
- Operator: JetBlue
- IATA flight No.: B6292
- ICAO flight No.: JBU292
- Call sign: JETBLUE 292
- Registration: N536JB
- Flight origin: Bob Hope Airport, Burbank, California, United States
- Destination: John F. Kennedy International Airport, New York City, United States
- Occupants: 146
- Passengers: 140
- Crew: 6
- Fatalities: 0
- Injuries: 0
- Survivors: 146

JetBlue Flight 292 was a scheduled flight from Bob Hope Airport in Burbank, California, to John F. Kennedy International Airport in New York City. On September 21, 2005, Captain Scott Burke executed an emergency landing in the Airbus A320 at Los Angeles International Airport after the nose gear jammed in an abnormal position. No one was injured.

== Aircraft ==
The aircraft involved was an Airbus A320-232, registered as N536JB with serial number 1784. It was manufactured by Airbus Industrie in 2002 and had logged 14227 airframe hours. It was powered by two IAE V2527-A5 engines.

== Incident ==
The captain was 46-year-old Scott Burke, with 10,829 total flight hours, 2,552 of which were on the Airbus A320. The first officer was 37-year-old David Razler, who out of 5,732 total flight hours had an estimated 1,284 hours on the Airbus A320.

Carrying 140 passengers and six crew, the Airbus A320-232 departed Burbank at 3:17 p.m. PDT (UTC−07:00). The aircraft was scheduled to fly 2,465 miles (3,967 km) to John F. Kennedy International Airport.

After takeoff from Burbank, the pilots could not retract the landing gear. They then flew low over Long Beach Municipal Airport to allow officials in the airport's control tower to assess the damage to its landing gear before attempting a landing. It was found that the nosewheel was rotated ninety degrees to the left, perpendicular to the direction of the fuselage.

Rather than land at Long Beach Airport, the crew decided to divert to Los Angeles International Airport (LAX), in order to take advantage of its long, wide runways and modern safety equipment.

The pilots flew the aircraft, which can carry up to 46,860 pounds (21,260 kg) of aviation fuel, in a figure eight pattern between Bob Hope Airport in Burbank and LAX for more than two hours in order to burn fuel and lower the risk of fire upon landing. This also served to lighten the plane, reducing potential stress on the landing gear and dramatically lowering landing speed as well. The Airbus A320 does not have the mechanical ability to dump fuel, despite various news agencies reporting that the aircraft was doing so over the ocean.

Because JetBlue planes are equipped with DirecTV satellite television, passengers on Flight 292 were able to watch live news coverage of their flight and listen to "analysts discuss[ing] their probable fate" while the plane circled over the Los Angeles for hours burning off fuel. Reportedly, moments before the plane touched down, a member of the flight crew turned off the broadcast as they had decided that it was "upsetting the passengers too much."

Emergency services and fire engines were standing by on the LAX ramp ahead of the landing. Although foam trucks were available, they were not used. The US Federal Aviation Administration no longer recommends pre-foaming runways, chiefly due to concerns that it would deplete firefighting foam supplies that might later be needed to respond to a fire; it is also difficult to determine exactly where a runway should be foamed, and pre-foaming might also reduce the effectiveness of the aircraft's brakes, potentially causing it to slide off the runway.

Passengers deplane by application of airport stairs vehicle

The plane landed on runway 25L. The nose gear generated sparks and flames when it touched down, but the plane was otherwise undamaged. To keep the nose gear off the ground as long as possible, reverse thrust was not used to slow the aircraft. As a result, the plane took longer than usual to decelerate, coming to a stop at 6:20 p.m. just 1,000 feet (300 m) before the end of the 11,096-foot (3,382 m) runway. (In comparison, the longest runway at Long Beach is 10,000 ft (3,000 m).) Los Angeles Fire Dept. Battalion Chief Lou Roupoli said, "The pilot did an outstanding job. He kept the plane on its rear tires as long as he could before he brought the nose gear down".

== Aftermath and evaluation ==
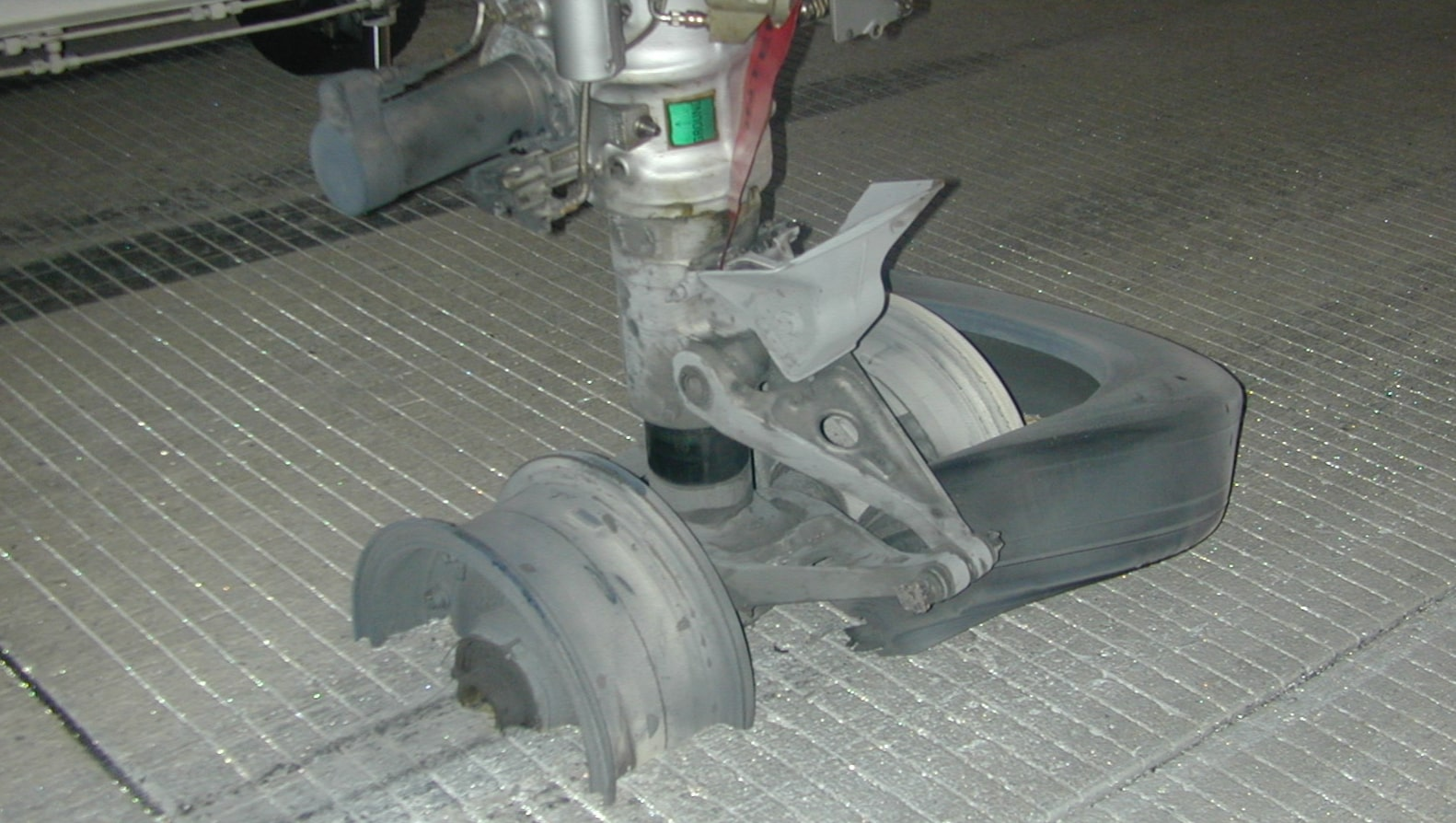
The damage done to Flight 292's landing gear

Passengers began to disembark less than seven minutes later. The landing was smooth and no physical injuries were reported. The aircraft was evacuated via an airport stairs vehicle, as opposed to evacuation slides.

As JetBlue did not operate from LAX at the time, the aircraft was towed to a Continental Airlines hangar at LAX for evaluation. Expert opinion expressed was that, despite the drama and live worldwide coverage, there was little real danger to the passengers or crew of Flight 292. The A320, like all modern airliners, is engineered to tolerate certain failures, and, if necessary, can be landed without the nose gear at all.

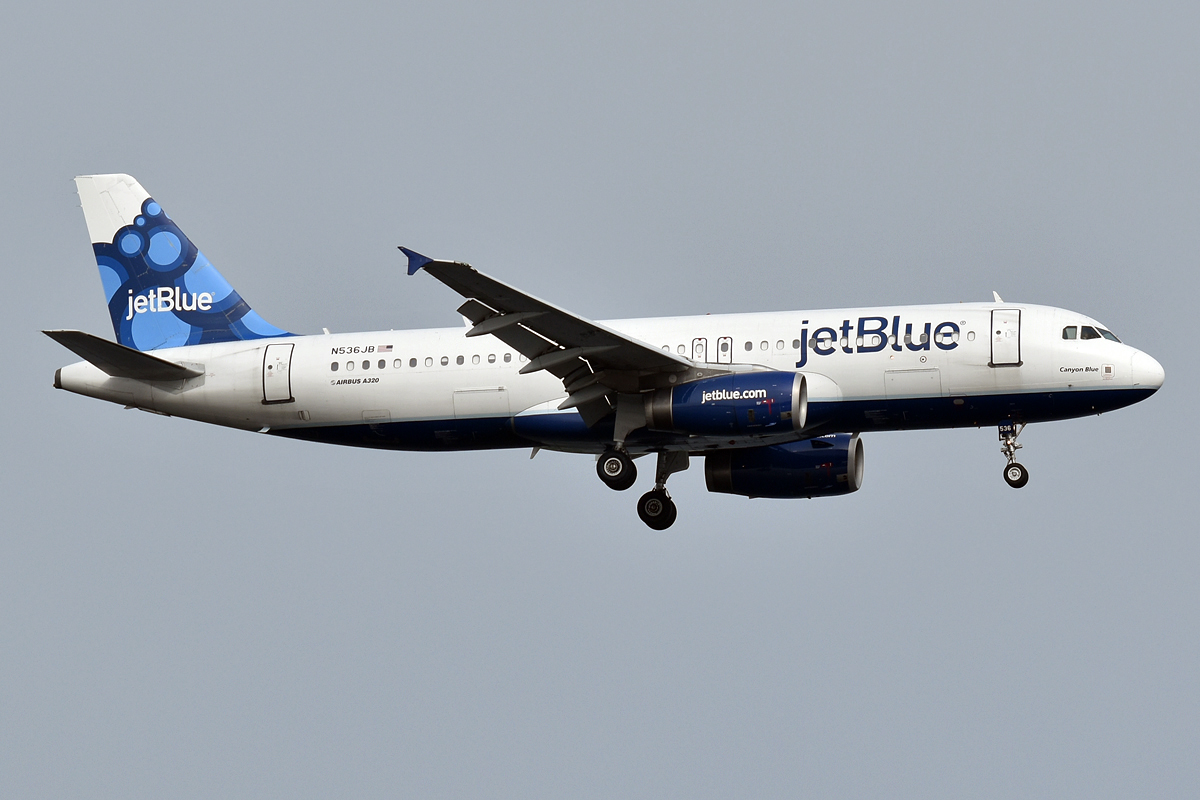
The aircraft involved, seen in 2019

The National Transportation Safety Board report says that worn-out seals were to blame for the malfunction, and that the Brake Steering Control Unit (BSCU) system contributed to the problem. The NTSB reported that Airbus had since upgraded the system to take care of the problem.

Following the incident, the aircraft was repaired and returned to service still bearing the name "Canyon Blue". The flight route designation for JetBlue's flights from Burbank to New York was changed from 292 to 358 while the other direction became 359.

=== Similar incidents ===
The media reported that this was at least the seventh occurrence of an Airbus A320 series aircraft touching down with the landing gear locked ninety degrees out of position, and one of at least sixty-seven "nose wheel failures" on A319, A320 and A321 aircraft worldwide since 1989. Earlier incidents included another JetBlue flight bound for New York City, a United Airlines flight into Chicago, and an America West Airlines flight into Columbus, Ohio.

While some incidents were traced to faulty maintenance and denied as a design flaw by Airbus Industries, the manufacturer had issued maintenance advisories to A320 owners which were later mandated as airworthiness directives (AD) by American and European aviation authorities. Messier-Dowty, which manufactures nose gear assemblies for the A320, stated in an NTSB report in 2004 that part of the gear had been redesigned to prevent future problems, but at the time the redesign was awaiting approval. Mechanics familiar with this common fault usually replace or reprogram the Brake Steering Control Unit (BSCU) computer.

== Notable passengers ==
Actress Taryn Manning was on the flight on her way to New York to promote the film Hustle & Flow. Screenwriter Zach Dean was also on the plane and, while contemplating his mortality, resolved to write a script about mortality, which eventually became the film Deadfall.

== In popular culture ==
NBC's Saturday Night Live featured a sketch parodying the event with the actors Steve Carell and Amy Poehler. The sketch was originally pitched by Colin Jost who subsequently co-wrote the sketch with Eric Kenward and Bill Hader. It was Jost's first sketch broadcast on the program.

The New Zealand television series World's Worst Flights had an episode featuring this incident.
