= The Tomorrow War =

2021 American science fiction film

- Promotional release poster
- Directed by: Chris McKay
- Written by: Zach Dean
- Produced by: David Ellison; Dana Goldberg; Don Granger; Jules Daly; David S. Goyer; Adam Kolbrenner
- Starring: Chris Pratt; Yvonne Strahovski; J. K. Simmons; Betty Gilpin; Sam Richardson; Edwin Hodge
- Cinematography: Larry Fong
- Edited by: Roger Barton; Garret Elkins
- Music by: Lorne Balfe
- Production companies: Skydance; Paramount Pictures; New Republic Pictures; Indivisible Productions
- Distributed by: Amazon Studios
- Release date: July 2, 2021
- Running time: 138 minutes
- Country: United States
- Language: English
- Budget: $200 million
- Box office: $19.2 million

The Tomorrow War is a 2021 American military science-fiction film directed by Chris McKay, written by Zach Dean, and starring Chris Pratt. It was produced by David Ellison, Dana Goldberg, Don Granger, David S. Goyer, Jules Daly, and Adam Kolbrenner, with a supporting cast featuring Yvonne Strahovski, J. K. Simmons, Betty Gilpin, Sam Richardson, Edwin Hodge, Jasmine Mathews, Ryan Kiera Armstrong, and Keith Powers. It follows a mix of present-day soldiers and civilians sent into the future to fight and stop a devastating alien swarm.

Originally set for theatrical release by Paramount Pictures, the film's distribution rights were acquired by Amazon Studios due to the COVID-19 pandemic, and digitally released on July 2, 2021, via Prime Video. With a budget of US$200 million, the film was one of the most expensive films to debut on a streaming platform. The Tomorrow War received mixed reviews from critics, with praise for the concept, action sequences, and performances (particularly Pratt and Richardson), but criticism for its derivative execution. A sequel is in development.

== Plot ==
In December 2022, biology teacher and former Green Beret Dan Forester fails to land a job at the United States Army Research Laboratory. While he watches the televised 2022 FIFA World Cup final, soldiers from the year 2051 arrive on the playing field through a time portal to warn that future humanity is near extinction due to alien invaders: the Whitespikes. In response, the world's military forces are sent to the future, but less than 20% survive, prompting a global draft. Dan, conscripted for a seven-day tour, is fitted with an electronic vambrace that tracks him and will automatically return him to his own time following his seven days.

Dan's wife, Emmy, encourages Dan to seek out his estranged engineer father, James Forester, to remove the vambrace so the family can go on the run. Dan meets with James; angry over his father having abandoned the family, he instead leaves with the vambrace intact. During orientation, one recruit, Charlie, notices the draftees are mostly older adults: Dan deduces that they were all people known to have died before 2051. Dan and the other draftees are deployed to Miami Beach, Florida in the future but are dropped at the wrong coordinates, high above the city, and most fall to their deaths.

Romeo Command orders the remaining recruits to rescue staff at a nearby laboratory. The lab staff are dead, but the team recovers their research data before the area is bombed. Dan and the survivors make it to a military camp in Puerto Plata in the Dominican Republic, where Dan discovers that Romeo Command is headed by his now-adult daughter, Colonel Muri Forester. After a strained reunion, the two embark on a successful mission to capture a female Whitespike, which are rarer than the males.

Muri later reveals that Dan became disillusioned after losing the research job, which caused her parents' divorce and estrangement from his daughter, just as James did when Dan was a child. Dan also learns he died in a car crash when Muri was 16. Dan and Muri, along with the captured female, are transported to the Jumplink site on a fortified ocean oil platform. They work on a toxin that targets the female, but the arrival of an enormous White Spike swarm quickly overwhelms the base.

Muri is severely injured and tells Dan to take the toxin to the past and mass produce it, believing that humanity will not survive in this timeline. Before Muri dies, the two reconcile, and Dan is successfully returned to the past with the toxin. He attempts to deliver it to the military so it can be returned to the future, but the Jumplink has been destroyed by the aliens.

After Dan tells Emmy about the future, they suspect that the Whitespikes may have arrived much earlier than 2048. This is supported by finding volcanic ash traces from the Changbai Mountains and the 946 AD Millennium Eruption using a claw that Dan brought back. They conclude that the aliens were already on Earth, trapped under the polar ice cap. When global warming melted the ice in the future, it released them. The military are unable to support Dan without proof, so he asks James to use his para-military connections to transport an eight-man team to Severnaya Zemlya, in northern Russia, to search for evidence. There, they find an alien spaceship that crashed into an ice sheet centuries ago.

Once inside, they realize that the Whitespikes are actually bio-weapons created by another alien species. The alien crew was killed in the crash, but the White Spikes have survived in suspended animation. The team inject the toxin into the dormant creatures, instantly killing them, but the remaining ones awaken. Team members Dorian and Hart sacrifice themselves by manually detonating the alien ship and eliminating the remaining males. A female escapes, but Dan and James track it down and kill it, preventing the future war from occurring. Returning home, Dan introduces a young Muri to James.

== Cast ==
- Chris Pratt as James Daniel "Dan" Forester Jr., a biology teacher and former Green Beret first sergeant who served two tours in Iraq
- Yvonne Strahovski as Colonel Muri Forester, Dan's adult daughter and a military scientist
  - Ryan Kiera Armstrong as young Muri Forester
- J. K. Simmons as James Daniel Forester, Sr., Dan's estranged father and Muri's grandfather, an antigovernment survivalist, mechanical engineer, and Vietnam veteran
- Betty Gilpin as Emmy Forester, Dan's wife and a therapist for returning draftees
- Sam Richardson as Charlie, a draftee with a PhD in Earth and atmospheric sciences
- Edwin Hodge as Dorian, a cancer-stricken draftee on his third tour of duty
- Jasmine Mathews as Lieutenant Hart, a future soldier who warned the world during the World Cup
- Keith Powers as Major Greenwood, Muri's executive officer

In addition, Mary Lynn Rajskub and Mike Mitchell portray draftees Norah and Cowan, respectively, while Seth Schenall portrays Martin, Dan's amateur volcanologist student.

== Production ==
=== Development ===
The film had been in development for several years by Skydance Media when they made a deal with writer Zach Dean. On February 13, 2019, Chris Pratt was confirmed as joining the film as the lead star and that it would be directed by Chris McKay, marking the latter's live-action debut after directing only for animated projects such as Moral Orel, Robot Chicken, Titan Maximum, and most recently The Lego Batman Movie. Pratt revealed that he would also serve as an executive producer of the film, making his debut as a producer.

The film was initially named Ghost Draft, and the film was revealed to be about a husband and father who is drafted to fight a future war where the fate of humanity could rely on his ability to correct issues of the past. The film was described as a dark and emotional sci-fi action epic about a generation of people who get drafted to go 30 years in the future to fight a losing war against aliens. Because the initial concept for the film was considered too dark, it was decided to lighten the treatment, hoping that the requested $20 million production would be approved to make a more marketable family-friendly film.

The film was originally set to be distributed by Paramount Pictures with the intention of giving the film a theatrical release. The film was delayed for seven months due to the COVID-19 pandemic, though, which forced theaters to close, leading to Top Gun: Maverick taking the release date, and the delay of Mission: Impossible – Dead Reckoning Part One. In April 2021, the distribution rights of the film were sold to Amazon with a cost over $200 million. McKay commented, "It's a movie that we wanted to go theatrically obviously, that was the intent and how we shot it — we shot it like a big movie, we didn't hold back. I know it can play in theaters; I've seen it play in theaters; it's a big, loud, exciting movie, but there's a tradeoff. We're in a world right now where [with] a big original sci-fi movie, there's a bunch of known properties that are coming in for a landing in theaters weekend after weekend. To be able to be a filmmaker who can have a dialogue with audiences in 240 countries at one time... that's also a very exciting proposition and I feel very lucky."

On July 18, 2019, Yvonne Strahovski was confirmed to be joining the film's cast. J. K. Simmons, Betty Gilpin, Sam Richardson, Theo Von (who later left the project), Jasmine Mathews, and Keith Powers also joined the cast in August, with Mary Lynn Rajskub, Edwin Hodge, and additional cast joining in September. On November 10, 2019, Pratt shared a photo of the filming on his Instagram with several actors who also appear in the film, and revealed that Paramount Pictures had officially retitled the film The Tomorrow War. Although it was not confirmed, the film likely had its name changed to ensure a Chinese release, due to the country having banned several films about ghosts and zombies.

=== Creature design ===
Creature designer Ken Barthelmey was confirmed to be the designer for the film's aliens. In early 2019, production designer Peter Wenham hired him due to his ability on his previous works. Barthelmey created over 67 different concept ideas for the aliens, taking inspiration from the Tripods of the War of the Worlds and the Sentinels from The Matrix. The aliens were described as vicious creatures that attack and eat everything in sight, so needed a compelling design that conveyed the hunger and intelligence of these creatures. The crew also wanted the aliens to have different abilities such as fast swimming and flying. This information eventually led Barthelmey to the film's final design. Additionally, Barthelmey came up with the idea of spike-shooting-tentacles, which became a major feature of the design.

=== Filming ===
Filming began on September 1, 2019, in Lincolnton, Georgia, the historical city in the central Savannah River area. The film was also shot at the Graves Mountain area in 2019. The battle scenes depicting a future Miami were filmed in downtown Atlanta and Buckhead, Georgia, using both CGI and live pyrotechnics to create the postapocalyptic setting.

Chris McKay revealed that he wanted the film to feel real rather than hyperstylized and to shoot on location and limit the amount of greenscreen used, which is the reason he chose Iceland for the scenes in Russia at the glacier Vatnajökull. The crew revealed that they eventually filmed at the top of an icy glacier. Chris Pratt revealed that while filming, they were told that a couple froze to death after falling through a fissure, but they still decided to take the risk hoping to impress the audience. The film wrapped filming on January 12, 2020. On July 1, 2021, the film was confirmed to have an estimated production budget of $200 million.

=== Visual effects ===
The supervisor of the visual effects of the movie was James Price, while Randy Starr was recruited as the producer of the visual effects. For the effect of the time jump, Chris McKay wanted the time travel of the film to be unique in the film, with Price stating, "We looked at images of the northern lights and the view of Earth from space, and at one point, I showed images from the Hubble Space Telescope because there is something kind of intimate and mysterious about them". The visual-effects staff decided to create a force field that forms above the draftees right before they jump in time. With the time machine activated, the travelers would slowly rise up and eventually be sent at the future. To capture the effect, the visual-effects team ran tests using an underwater cloud tank to simulate time displacement. However, VFX supervisor JD Schwalm decided to use a practical wall of smoke. The smoke was made to be thick enough so the camera could not see through it, and then a stunt coordinator rigged the actors on wires and flew them through the wall of smoke. CGI electrical currents were provided in postproduction so the screen can represent the actors materializing out of thin air.

== Music ==
On August 6, 2020, Lorne Balfe was confirmed to be the composer for The Tomorrow War. Balfe had already collaborated with director Chris McKay on the score for the 2017 animated comedy movie The Lego Batman Movie. The soundtrack album was released on July 2, 2021, by Milan Records.

== Release ==
The film had been initially scheduled for release on December 25, 2020, by Paramount Pictures, but due to the COVID-19 pandemic it was rescheduled to July 23, 2021, taking the release date of Mission: Impossible – Dead Reckoning Part One, then later pulled from the schedule again. In January 2021, Amazon Studios was in final talks to acquire the film for around $200 million. In April 2021, Amazon announced it had officially acquired the film, and released it on Amazon Prime Video worldwide on July 2, 2021.

== Reception ==
=== Box office ===
On September 3, 2021, the film was released theatrically only in China, and grossed $8.1 million over the weekend, finishing in second place behind Free Guy. By the end of its run, the film grossed $19.2 million.

=== Audience viewership ===
Samba TV reported that 2.41 million households watched the film from July 2–5, the most ever for an Amazon Original tracked by the service. According to Screen Engine's PostVOD summary, the "definite recommend" audience score for the film was 53%, compared to a normal score for a streaming title of 42%. From July 5–11, the film garnered 1.1 billion minutes of viewing according to Nielsen ratings, and was the number-three most-watched subscription video-on-demand title for the week, just behind Virgin River (1.45 billion minutes) and Manifest (1.81 billion minutes). The film continued to top the charts in subsequent weeks, logging 1.222 billion minutes of viewership from July 21–27 (equal to about 885,507 total watches) according to Nielsen ratings. According to Samba TV, the film was watched in 5.2 million households in its first 30 days of release.

By August 2021, the film became the most-watched film in the summer by a streaming service, breaking several records from Prime Video and the most-watched film for Amazon Prime Video. According to Nielsen, the film reportedly was kept in the first place of the most watched movies in the top-10 list, managing to beat films such as Black Widow and Luca, with both being from Disney+. It also managed to beat the viewership of the complete series of The Fear Street Trilogy, which were released to Netflix. Pratt celebrated the film's success, calling it a "home run win" and on Instagram, he published a new post where he commented: "We couldn't defeat the Whitespikes without our fellow soldiers."

=== Critical response ===
On review aggregator Rotten Tomatoes, the film holds an approval rating of 52% based on 207 reviews. The website's critics consensus reads, "Chris Pratt ably anchors this sci-fi adventure, even if The Tomorrow War may not linger in the memory much longer than today." On Metacritic, the film has a weighted average score of 45 out of 100, based on 35 critics, indicating "mixed or average reviews".

Richard Roeper of the Chicago Sun-Times gave the film two out of four stars and wrote, "The Tomorrow War is an earnest effort to bring something new to the time-travel action genre, but this movie is a 2021 vehicle made of parts from the 2010s and the 1990s and 1980s." IndieWire's David Ehrlich gave the film a C grade, writing, "Which isn't to say that The Tomorrow War is bad — it boasts a clever premise, a killer supporting turn from Sam Richardson, and an uncommonly well-defined sense of place for such a murky CGI gloop-fest... But for all of those laudable attributes, this flavorless loss-leader of a film is neutered by its refusal to put audiences on their heels." John Defore for the Hollywood Reporter wrote that "the pic may be missing that certain something that would have made it huge in theaters" but that it is entertaining on Amazon stream anyway and praised Pratt's acting. IGN criticized then described the movie as "Supremely stupid sci-fi", and further stated that Pratt flounders in the movie. Leah Greenblatt from the Entertainment Weekly gave the film a B− grade and commented "Eventually the storyline dissolves into soft-focus sentiment and a final, snowy set piece whose execution is so patently ludicrous a 1970s Bond villain might file for intellectual property rights (though the climate-change message is sneakily on point). Until then it's enough, almost, just to watch Pratt & Co. race and banter and blast their way through Tomorrow's futures past."

Robert Daniels from the Los Angeles Times wrote in his review, "The Tomorrow War tries its hand at throwback '90s action glory, back when cinematic adventures could be everything for everybody. Instead, this postapocalyptic combat flick lacks the intensity to reach the 1.21 gigawatts worth of power needed to emblazon our screens in escapist flair." Wendy Ide from The Observer wrote in her review, "The creature design is first-rate – the aliens are ravenous, rapid, and equipped with a pair of death tentacles. And Pratt, and in particular Betty Gilpin as his wife, give likable, grounded performances. But the screenplay is a bloated, unwieldy thing that is at least 30 minutes longer than it should be." Roxana Hadadi from Polygon considered the film to be repetitive and compared it unfavorably with Edge of Tomorrow and Starship Troopers, for which she stated, "We get it! This average, blue-collar American is worthy of all our admiration! That approach is so clobbering and clunky that The Tomorrow War is constantly tripping over itself while delivering it." Christy Lemire of RogerEbert.com gave the film one and a half out of four, and stated, "The supposedly original script from writer Zach Dean offers very little that's innovative or inspired."

Barry Hertz from The Globe and Mail compared the film unfavorably with Independence Day and Starship Troopers, criticizing its unoriginality and wrote, "It is a fool's errand to imagine what someone like Verhoeven would have done with The Tomorrow War's material – this is a movie made for the express purposes of delivering some lazy woo-hoo summer fun, not any kind of sneaky subversiveness. But if I had a time machine, I'd punt myself to the past just before The Tomorrow War went into production, and save everyone the trouble." Peter Travers from ABC News' Good Morning America considered the film with a clichéd storytelling, gimmicky visual effects, and borrowed inspiration by commenting, "The Tomorrow War chases its own tail for a crushingly repetitive 140 minutes to reach an ending you could have seen coming from deep space. To quote Yogi Berra, 'It's déja vu all over again.' There's nothing tomorrow about a recycled jumble that places all its bets on yesterday." Mick LaSalle from the San Francisco Chronicle praised the visuals, story, and action sequences, and stated, "Yet it would probably be a mistake to emphasize the relationship aspect of The Tomorrow War too much. At its core, this is just a really good monster movie. All the same, there's a touch of beauty to it." Allen Adams from The Main Edge gave the film 2.5 out of 5, and stated, "For all that, The Tomorrow War isn't a bad watch. It's got some action and some jokes and some decent performances. What it doesn't have is that underlying originality, that expression of ideas that makes the best science fiction work so well. And unfortunately, audiences will distinctly feel that lack."

Randy Myers from The Mercury News gave three and a half out of four by commenting, "Given the scope and spectacle of the action sequences — all tautly choreographed and edited — it's a wonder that Paramount let this one get away. McKay might be best known for Robot Chicken and The Lego Batman Movie, but with Tomorrow, he emerges as the next go-to action director." Chris Agar from ScreenRant added in his review as a positive feedback, "The Tomorrow War boasts an interesting setup and solid performances by the cast, but it still comes across as unremarkable, if standard, genre fare." Hoai-Tran Bui gave a positive feedback by scoring 6.5 out of 10 to the film, and stated, "The Tomorrow War is not by any means great sci-fi, nor is it even significantly good sci-fi. The film is half an hour too long and starts to feel like a slog by the end of the first hour. The sentimentality threatens to veer into melodrama at points, which Pratt struggles to handle. But The Tomorrow War has got a trashy popcorn vibe to it that it wholeheartedly embraces, and a cornball machismo that you can't help but get taken in by, even if just for a second."

=== Accolades ===
Award	Date of ceremony	Category	Recipient(s)	Result	Ref.
People's Choice Awards	December 7, 2021	The Movie of 2021	The Tomorrow War	Nominated	
People's Choice Awards	December 7, 2021	The Action Movie of 2021	The Tomorrow War	Nominated	
People's Choice Awards	December 7, 2021	The Male Movie Star of 2021	Chris Pratt	Nominated	
People's Choice Awards	December 7, 2021	The Action Movie Star of 2021	Chris Pratt	Nominated	
Annie Awards	February 26, 2022	Best Character Animation – Live Action	Carmelo Leggiero, Cajun Hylton, Michel Alencar Magalhaes, Florent Limouzin, Dave Clayton	Nominated	
Visual Effects Society Awards	March 8, 2022	Outstanding Special (Practical) Effects in a Photoreal Project	J. D. Schwalm, Wayne Rowe, Jim Schwalm, Haukur Karlsson	Nominated	
Satellite Awards	April 2, 2022	Best Visual Effects	Carmelo Leggiero, James E. Price, J. D. Schwalm, Randall Starr, and Sheldon Stopsack	Nominated	

== Sequel ==
On July 8, 2021, Skydance and Amazon reportedly were in discussions to produce a sequel, due to the film's success, with the hopes of creating a new movie franchise for the streaming service of Prime Video. Director Chris McKay and screenwriter Zach Dean were to be returning for the sequel, while stars Chris Pratt, Yvonne Strahovski, Betty Gilpin, Sam Richardson, Edwin Hodge, and J.K. Simmons were expected to reprise their respective roles. McKay revealed that he would like for the sequel to expand the worldbuilding and explore more concepts that could be used for the characters' further adventures, with one of them being the origins of the Whitespikes: "I think there's a lot of story on the table from a time-travel perspective, from a world-building perspective from the Whitespikes. So, there's a lot of things that I think we can mess with and have a lot fun. It's like what they did with The Purge or something like that, where it's like they start with a really interesting concept and now the next movie and the next movie get to sort of play with those things and explore those things and blow them out." Besides a sequel, McKay talked about the possibility of developing a spin-off focused on Richardson's character Charlie.
