= 24 Hours to Live =

- Theatrical release poster
- Directed by: Brian Smrz
- Written by: Zach Dean; Jim McClain; Ron Mita
- Produced by: Mark Gao; Basil Iwanyk; Gregory Ouanhon
- Starring: Ethan Hawke: Xu Qing; Paul Anderson; Liam Cunningham; Rutger Hauer
- Cinematography: Ben Nott
- Edited by: Elliot Greenberg
- Music by: Tyler Bates
- Production companies: Fundamental Films; Thunder Road Pictures
- Distributed by: Saban Films
- Release dates: October 26, 2017 (Austin Film Festival); December 1, 2017 (United States)
- Running time: 93 minutes
- Countries: South Africa; United States; China
- Language: English
- Box office: $5.8 million

24 Hours to Live is a 2017 science fiction action thriller film directed by Brian Smrz and starring Ethan Hawke, Xu Qing, Paul Anderson, Liam Cunningham, and Rutger Hauer. It follows a career assassin who goes on a rampage to exact revenge and find redemption after he is mortally wounded and brought back to life for 24 hours using a newly developed technology. The film premiered at the Austin Film Festival on October 26, 2017, and was released on VOD and in select theaters on December 1, 2017.

== Plot ==
In South Africa, a convoy of Interpol agents led by Lin (Xu Qing) transports a prisoner, Keith. At a checkpoint, they are ambushed. Most of the agents are killed, but Lin escapes with Keith.

Travis Conrad (Ethan Hawke), a hitman, fishes with his father in law, Frank (Rutger Hauer). They scatter ashes in the ocean, noting the one year anniversary of the deaths they commemorate. After Frank falls asleep, Travis goes to a bar to get cocaine. He assaults two thugs following him who tell him Jim wants to see him. Jim offers Travis $1 million per day to clean up the botched assassination attempt on Keith and Lin. Though he initially refuses, claiming he's retired, the money convinces him. He travels to Hong Kong and meets Lin's son, from whom he steals his cell phone and determines Lin's location. He meets her at the airport and seduces her. The next morning, he gets Keith's location from her phone but chooses not to kill her; she realizes he is an agent and kills him.

Travis' agency, Red Mountain, brings him back to life using an experimental procedure. Once he tells them Keith's location, Jim, his friend and former fellow Marine, informs him that they just revived him to get the location, and the doctor plans to kill him upon her return. Travis obtains a scalpel and cuts his restraints; when the doctor returns he kills a guard and learns from her that with a timer on his wrist, he has 24 hours to live. He escapes with her as a hostage and pursues Lin, telling her not to make him regret not killing her.

Keith testifies against Red Mountain, revealing they experimented on over 70 civilians to develop the resurrection procedure and forced him to dispose of the bodies. Just after he testifies, Jim snipes several guards from a clocktower and Red Mountain assaults the building. Lin and Keith escape when Travis arrives to help, knowing Red Mountain betrayed him. During the chase, Keith is killed, but he managed to get the camera's memory card before they left. Travis entrusts the card to Lin, but Jim calls to inform them that they have taken her son in exchange for the card. Travis decides to help her retrieve him and collects guns and explosives from a safe house.

They travel to the village where the civilians Red Mountain experimented on lived and enlist their help in avenging them. Travis knows prisoner transport protocol; they corner and ambush the convoy and get the boy back. Travis tells Lin to get the testimony to the authorities and decides to spend his last half hour alive delaying Red Mountain from pursuing her. He forces a surviving Red Mountain agent to drive him to base claiming he is the prisoner; when he arrives he kills several guards and drives the car into the building. He detonates the car and assaults the office where Jim and the Red Mountain leader, Wetzler, are holed up. After killing all the agents in the room, Wetzler tries to goad Travis into killing Jim, who knew that Wetzler ordered his wife and son killed in an attempt to keep him from quitting the company. Though angered, Travis feels remorse for all the killing he's done and lets Jim live. Jim then approaches Wetzler to kill him as police arrive. Though they warn him not to shoot, he shoots Wetzler and is killed by the police.

Travis dies and has a vision of his family on a beach. He beckons for his son, but he runs away. Travis begins to hear the doctor's voice and awakes in the lab where he was first resurrected.

== Cast ==
- Ethan Hawke as Travis Conrad
- Xu Qing as Lin Bisset
- Paul Anderson as Jim Morrow
- Rutger Hauer as Frank
- Tyrone Keogh as Keith Zara
- Nathalie Boltt as Dr. Helen
- Liam Cunningham as Wetzler
- Jeremy Yong as Christopher Bisset
- Susan Young as Vicky Liu
- Hakeem Kae-Kazim as Amahie

== Release ==
Saban Films released the film on VOD and in select theaters on December 1, 2017. 24 Hours to Live has earned $5.8 million in worldwide theatrical box office, and sales of its DVD/Blu-ray releases have earned $1.7 million.

== Reception ==
On review aggregator website Rotten Tomatoes, the film holds an approval rating of 52% based on 21 reviews, and an average rating of 4.92/10.
