= Hero Wanted =

- DVD cover
- Directed by: Brian Smrz
- Written by: Chad Law; Evan Law
- Produced by: Danny Lerner; Johnny Martin; David E. Ornston; Richard Salvatore; John Thompson; Les Weldon
- Starring: Cuba Gooding Jr.; Ray Liotta; Kim Coates; Norman Reedus; Jean Smart; Christa Campbell; Ben Cross; Tommy Flanagan; Sammi Hanratty
- Cinematography: Larry Blanford
- Edited by: Tim Anderson
- Music by: Kenneth Burgomaster
- Production company: Nu Image Films
- Distributed by: Sony Pictures Home Entertainment
- Release date: April 29, 2008
- Running time: 94 minutes
- Country: United States
- Language: English
- Budget: $7 million

Hero Wanted is a 2008 American action thriller film directed by Brian Smrz in his directorial debut. The film stars Cuba Gooding Jr., with a supporting cast of Ray Liotta, Kim Coates, and Norman Reedus. The film was released on direct-to-DVD in the United States on April 29, 2008.

== Plot ==
Liam Case (Cuba Gooding Jr.) is a garbage man whose life hasn't quite turned out the way he expected it would. In order to impress the girl of his dreams, Liam plans an elaborate bank heist that will culminate with him jumping in to save the day at the last minute. When the day of the heist arrives, however, the plan takes an unexpected turn and both the girl and Liam end up being shot by one of the robbers. After recovering from his injury, Liam kills the robber who shot him and the girl. He then realizes that the associates of the dead robber will not stop until they have avenged that death.

== Cast ==
- Cuba Gooding Jr. as Liam Case
- Ray Liotta as Detective Terry Subcott
- Kim Coates as Skinner McGraw
- Norman Reedus as Swain
- Jean Smart as Melanie McQueen
- Christa Campbell as Kayla McQueen
- Ben Cross as Cosmo Jackson
- Tommy Flanagan as Derek
- Gary Cairns II as Gill
- Steven Kozlowski as Lynch McGraw
- Sammi Hanratty as Marley Singer
- Paul Sampson as Gordy McGraw
- Todd Jensen as Detective Wallace MacTee

== Production ==
Shooting took place in Sofia, Bulgaria in 32 days on April 3 and May 5, 2007.

== Home media ==
DVD was released in Region 1 in the United States on April 29, 2008, and also Region 2 in the United Kingdom on 16 June 2008, it was distributed by Sony Pictures Home Entertainment. It is included a downloadable Digital Copy (PC and PSP) version of the disc with studio-imposed restrictions (and was one of the first DVDs to offer this now commonplace feature).

== Reception ==
David Johnson of DVD Verdict wrote, "It's violent and over-the-top, but Hero Wanted is ultimately a slick, hollow affair."
