= Deadfall (2012 film) =

2012 American crime drama film directed by Stefan Ruzowitzky

- Theatrical release poster
- Directed by: Stefan Ruzowitzky
- Written by: Zach Dean
- Produced by: Gary Levinsohn; Shelly Clippard; Ben Cosgrove; Todd Wagner
- Starring: Eric Bana; Olivia Wilde; Charlie Hunnam; Kate Mara; Treat Williams; Kris Kristofferson; Sissy Spacek
- Cinematography: Shane Hurlbut
- Edited by: Arthur Tarnowski; Dan Zimmerman
- Music by: Marco Beltrami
- Production company: Mutual Film Company
- Distributed by: Magnolia Pictures; StudioCanal; 2929 Productions
- Release dates: April 22, 2012 (Tribeca Film Festival); December 7, 2012 (United States)
- Running time: 94 minutes
- Countries: United States, Canada
- Language: English
- Budget: $12 million
- Box office: $1.9 million

Deadfall is a 2012 American crime drama film directed by Stefan Ruzowitzky, written by Zach Dean, and starring Eric Bana, Olivia Wilde, and Charlie Hunnam.

== Plot ==
After a successful casino heist, Addison and Liza go on the run in Michigan. They decide to split up when their driver is fatally injured in a car crash and Addison murders a state trooper responding to the scene. They resolve to cross the Canada–United States border during a blizzard. Meanwhile, after being released from prison, former boxer Jay calls his parents, retired sheriff Chet and his wife June, to say he'll be home for Thanksgiving. He confronts his former coach in Detroit, demanding money owed him. The two get into a fight and Jay, thinking he has killed him and unwilling to return to jail, flees.

Hannah, the sheriff's deputy, is invited to join Jay's parents for Thanksgiving dinner. She is treated poorly by her father, Sheriff Becker, who does not want to include her in the hunt for the fugitives. Hannah, who has been accepted to be trained for the FBI, excuses her father's behavior because of the loss of his wife several years ago. Jay finds a shivering Liza in the road and offers her a ride to the nearest gas station. Meanwhile, wandering in the snow, Addison murders an elderly man — losing a little finger in the struggle — and steals his damaged snowmobile. He is later forced to abandon the snowmobile, but not before cauterizing his wound on the still hot engine.

When Jay and Liza stop at a bar during the blizzard, she sneaks back to his truck, finds Jay's address, and leaves Addison a message to meet her there. A romantic relationship develops between Jay and Liza, who have sex in a motel. Elsewhere, Addison invades a cabin in the woods and kills the abusive father of the family. After dumping the man's body, he tends to the distraught wife and her children. Hannah is called to investigate the situation in the cabin. Meanwhile, realizing that she has feelings for Jay, Liza calls Addison to say she couldn't proceed with the plan and that she'll find another ride. Jay confesses his feelings for her. Liza explains how her brother was her protector from their abusive father, who was killed when they were young.

Hannah and two officers reach the cabin. Hannah notices a man's corpse and tries to warn the officer at the door, but Addison shoots him with a shotgun. Addison flees on a snowmobile with Hannah and the other officer giving chase is killed.

Addison arrives at Jay's house and holds his parents captive. When Liza and Jay arrive for Thanksgiving dinner, Addison pretends at first not to know who Liza is. They eat dinner together. Addison sees Liza act protectively of Jay and his family. Hannah receives a call from a Detroit detective about Jay's coach, who is recovering from a concussion. She goes to the house and is also taken captive by Addison.

Becker finds Addison's snowmobile at the house, draws a weapon and goes inside. He fires at Addison, but it turns out to be Hannah, surreptitiously dressed by Addison in his own jacket. Becker is then shot by Addison. A struggle between Jay and Addison ensues outside. Jay overpowers Addison but releases him when Liza begs him to, reminding Jay that Addison is her brother. Addison points another gun at Jay and challenges Jay to proclaim his love for Liza, which Jay does. Before Addison can decide what to do next, Liza fatally shoots him. Other police arrive to discover Hannah's life has been saved by a bulletproof vest.

== Cast ==
- Eric Bana as Addison
- Olivia Wilde as Liza
- Charlie Hunnam as Jay Mills
- Kris Kristofferson as Chester "Chet" Mills
- Alain Goulem as Bobby
- Allison Graham as Mandy
- Sissy Spacek as June Mills
- Kate Mara as Deputy Hannah Becker
- Treat Williams as Sheriff Marshall T. Becker
- Jason Cavalier as Deputy Travis
- Maxime Savaria as Deputy Brice
- Tom Jackson as Old Indian Hunter

== Background ==
As a passenger on JetBlue Flight 292 in 2005, flying for hours in a figure 8 over Southern California to prepare for a risky landing, Zach Dean contemplated his mortality and resolved to write a screenplay about family. The rights to the script, originally titled Kin, were optioned by Mutual Films and in 2010 it was reported that Bana, Wilde, and Hunnam were in casting talks. Shooting began in Canada in 2011.

== Release ==
Deadfall premiered at the 2012 Tribeca Festival. It opened in theaters on December 7, 2012.

== Critical reception ==
Deadfall received negative reviews and has a rating of 34% on Rotten Tomatoes based on 79 reviews with an average rating of 4.93 out of 10. The film also has a score of 52 out of 100 on Metacritic based on 24 reviews.

Manohla Dargis' New York Times review of the film praises Ruzowitzky's direction and cinematography but critics his choices as, at times, "overly self-conscious". Mark Jenkins' NPR review was unfavorable towards Bana's performance and the uninteresting ending, but praised the pacing of the film.
