= Superman Returns =

2006 superhero film by Bryan Singer

- Theatrical release poster
- Directed by: Bryan Singer
- Screenplay by: Michael Dougherty; Dan Harris
- Story by: Bryan Singer; Michael Dougherty; Dan Harris
- Based on: Characters appearing in comic books published by DC Comics
- Produced by: Jon Peters; Bryan Singer; Gilbert Adler
- Starring: Brandon Routh; Kate Bosworth; James Marsden; Frank Langella; Eva Marie Saint; Parker Posey; Kal Penn; Sam Huntington; Kevin Spacey
- Cinematography: Newton Thomas Sigel
- Edited by: John Ottman; Elliot Graham
- Music by: John Ottman
- Production companies: Warner Bros. Pictures; Legendary Pictures; Bad Hat Harry Productions; Peters Entertainment
- Distributed by: Warner Bros. Pictures
- Release dates: June 21, 2006 (Los Angeles); June 28, 2006 (United States)
- Running time: 154 minutes
- Country: United States
- Language: English
- Budget: $223 million (gross); $204 million (net)
- Box office: $391.1 million

Superman Returns is a 2006 American superhero film based on the DC Comics character Superman. The film was directed by Bryan Singer, and written by Michael Dougherty and Dan Harris from a story by Singer, Dougherty, and Harris. It serves as an homage sequel to Superman (1978) and Superman II (1980), ignoring the events of Superman III (1983), Supergirl (1984), and Superman IV: The Quest for Peace (1987). The film stars Brandon Routh as Superman, Kate Bosworth as Lois Lane and Kevin Spacey as Lex Luthor, with James Marsden, Frank Langella, Eva Marie Saint and Parker Posey in supporting roles. In the film, Superman returns to Earth after five years and discovers that his love interest Lois Lane has moved on from him, and that his archenemy Lex Luthor is planning to kill him and reshape North America.

After a series of unsuccessful projects to resurrect Superman following the critical and financial failure of The Quest for Peace, Warner Bros. Pictures hired Singer to direct Superman Returns in July 2004. The majority of principal photography took place at Fox Studios Australia, Sydney while the visual effects sequences were handled by several studios, including Sony Pictures Imageworks, Rhythm & Hues Studios (R&H), Framestore CFC, Rising Sun Pictures and The Orphanage; filming began in March 2005 and ended in November. The film was the first film produced by Legendary Pictures.

The film received generally positive reviews from critics, who praised its visual effects, storyline, and Singer's direction, but criticized its screenplay and runtime. While Superman Returns was one of the biggest films of the year, earning $391.1 million on a budget of $204–223 million and becoming the ninth highest-grossing film of 2006, Warner Bros. was disappointed with the worldwide box office return and cancelled a sequel for release in 2009. The Superman film series was rebooted in 2013 with Man of Steel, directed by Zack Snyder and starring Henry Cavill as Superman. Routh later reprised his role as Superman in the 2019 Arrowverse crossover "Crisis on Infinite Earths".

== Plot ==
Superman has been missing for five years, ever since he traveled to the location where astronomers believed they discovered the remains of Krypton. His arch-nemesis, Lex Luthor, has recently been released from prison and married a wealthy widow to inherit her fortune upon her death.

Having failed to find any surviving Kryptonians, Superman returns to Earth and resumes his job at the Daily Planet in Metropolis as his alter-ego Clark Kent. There, he learns that the woman he loves, Lois Lane, is engaged to Perry White's nephew, Richard, with whom she has a 5-year-old son, Jason. She has won the Pulitzer Prize for her article "Why the World Doesn't Need Superman."

Luthor travels to the Fortress of Solitude and steals Kryptonian crystals, which he uses for an experiment that causes a power outage on the East Coast. The power loss interferes with the flight test of a Space Shuttle to be launched into space from its piggy-back mounting on an airliner occupied by Lois, who is covering the story. Clark flies into action as Superman, launching the shuttle into the sky and stopping the plane from crashing into a baseball field.

The world rejoices at Superman's return, though he has difficulty coping with the fact that those he was once close to have moved on from him. When Superman gets distracted by an out-of-control vehicle, a diversion involving Luthor's henchwoman, Kitty Kowalski, Luthor steals Kryptonite from the Metropolis Museum of Natural History. Perry assigns Lois to interview Superman, while Clark investigates the blackout. Lois and Jason inadvertently board Luthor's yacht and are captured after Lois decides to hold an interest in the blackout story, which she connects to Luthor's experiment. He reveals to them his plan to use one of the stolen Kryptonian crystals, which he has combined with the Kryptonite, to grow a new landmass in the Atlantic Ocean that will supplant the United States and kill billions of people.

Seeing Jason's apparent reaction to Kryptonite, Luthor asks Lois who his father is; Lois asserts that his father is Richard. The crystal begins forming Luthor's landmass as Lois attempts to escape. She is attacked by one of Luthor's henchmen, but, as the boat rocks in the waves, a piano which was next to Jason slams into the henchman from off-screen. Meanwhile, Superman attempts to minimize the destruction in Metropolis caused by the new landmass's growth, and Richard pilots a seaplane to rescue Lois and Jason.

Confronting Luthor, Superman is weakened by the Kryptonite-filled landmass, allowing Luthor and his henchmen to brutalize him. Superman is stabbed with a shard of Kryptonite by Luthor, falls into the ocean, and is left to drown, but Lois and Richard rescue him. After Lois removes the Kryptonite shard from his body, Superman regains his strength and lifts the landmass, thanks to much of the island's mass being between him and the Kryptonite. Luthor's henchmen are killed, but Luthor and Kitty escape in their helicopter. Unwilling to let billions of people die, Kitty tosses away the crystals that Lex stole from the Fortress of Solitude before their helicopter runs out of fuel, leaving them stranded on a deserted island.

Superman pushes the landmass with the crystals into space. Weakened by the Kryptonite, he crashes back to Earth. At the hospital, after removing another shard of Kryptonite from Superman's body, doctors learn that they cannot penetrate his skin with their surgical tools, and he remains in a coma. While visiting Superman, Lois whispers something into his ear and kisses him. Superman awakens and visits the sleeping Jason, to whom he recites the last speech from his late biological father Jor-El. As Lois starts writing an article entitled "Why the World Needs Superman" (but has nothing on the page but the title), Superman reassures her that he is back to stay and flies off to low orbit, where he gazes down at the world.

== Cast ==
- Brandon Routh as Clark Kent / Superman: The Kryptonian superhero whose alter-ego is a mild-mannered farmer-turned-journalist.
- Kate Bosworth as Lois Lane: A reporter who works with Clark Kent at the Daily Planet, and former lover of Superman.
- James Marsden as Richard White: The nephew of the Daily Planet editor-in-chief Perry White and fiancé to Lois Lane. Marsden said Richard acts as an emotional challenge for Superman, since the hero comes back to find that "Lois Lane picks somebody who's very Supermanesque".
- Frank Langella as Perry White: The editor of the Daily Planet.
- Eva Marie Saint as Martha Kent: Clark Kent's adoptive mother.
- Parker Posey as Kitty Kowalski: Lex Luthor's henchwoman. She served as a prison nurse and would give Lex his examinations. The character is based on Eve Teschmacher from the 1978 film, portrayed by Valerie Perrine.
- Kal Penn as Stanford: One of Luthor's henchmen.
- Sam Huntington as Jimmy Olsen: A photographer at the Daily Planet and a friend of Clark.
- Kevin Spacey as Lex Luthor: A sociopathic scientist armed with vast resources and an extensive knowledge of science who is Superman's nemesis. Spacey's version of Luthor retains some campy attributes and a similar interest in real estate from the earlier Gene Hackman version, but is also more serious and threatening than Hackman's portrayal. Spacey said that director Singer told him to play the character as "darker and more bitter" compared to Hackman and not to use the earlier portrayal as an inspiration.
- Tristan Lake Leabu as Jason White: The son of Lois Lane. The question of whether Superman or Richard is Jason's father is never explicitly resolved. Jason has asthma and other ailments, but some scenes tease that he feels discomfort around Kryptonite and that he might have superhuman strength.

Marlon Brando appears posthumously as Jor-El, Superman's late biological father. Brando, who died in 2004, reprises his role from the 1978 film through the use of previous footage combined with computer-generated imagery, his footage, filmed before by Richard Donner for Superman II before his dismissal, were rescued for the making of Superman II: The Richard Donner Cut. This required negotiations with Brando's estate for permission to have his footage used. Singer explained, "We had access to all of the Brando footage that was shot. There was unused footage that had Brando reciting poems, trailing off subject, and swearing like a sailor."

Peta Wilson appears as NASA spokeswoman Bobbie-Faye. Jack Larson, who portrayed Jimmy Olsen in the 1950s television series Adventures of Superman, makes a cameo appearance as Bo the bartender. Noel Neill—who portrayed Lois Lane in the television series and the film serials Superman (1948) and Atom Man vs. Superman (1950)—appears as Luthor's elderly wife Gertrude Vanderworth. Richard Branson cameos as the engineer aboard the space shuttle, along with his son Sam. Another of Luthor's henchmen (Riley) is played by Australian Rugby League footballer Ian Roberts.

== Production ==
Director, screenwriter, and producer Bryan Singer conceived the storyline of "Superman returning to Earth after a five-year absence" during the filming of X2 (2003). He presented the idea to X-Men (2000) and X2 producer Lauren Shuler Donner and her husband Richard Donner, director of Superman (1978). Donner greeted Singer's idea with positive feedback.

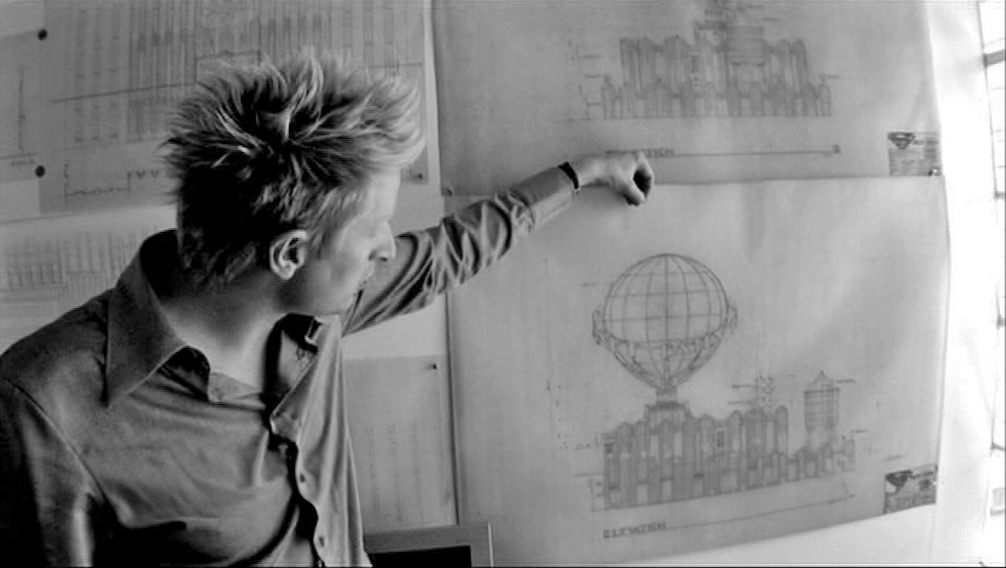
Production Designer Guy Hendrix Dyas in the Warner Bros. Studio art department during pre-production on "Superman Returns", Burbank, California

In March 2004, Warner Bros. Pictures was commencing pre-production on Superman: Flyby (which Singer previously passed on as he wanted to make his own story), which had a scheduled theatrical release date of June 2006. McG was signed to direct with a script by J. J. Abrams, but dropped out in June 2004. That same month, Singer was approached by Warner Bros. to pitch his idea for Superman Returns, as he was preparing to leave for Hawaii on a short vacation with his X2 writers Michael Dougherty and Dan Harris. While in Hawaii, Singer, Dougherty, and Harris began to outline the film treatment. In July 2004, Singer signed on to direct and develop Superman Returns.

Although he was not a comic book fan, Singer was most impressed with Donner's 1978 film, citing it as an influence on his, Dougherty, and Harris's writing. With Singer's hiring, he dropped out of X-Men: The Last Stand (2006) and also had the Logan's Run remake pushed back. Superman Returns was financed 50/50 between Warner Bros. and Legendary Pictures, and pre-production began in November 2004. By February 2005, Dougherty and Harris had written six drafts of the script. Early versions of the script contained references to the September 11 attacks before they were removed.

=== Casting ===
Jim Caviezel expressed interest in playing the role of Superman but Singer believed only an unknown actor would be suitable for the part of Superman. Brandon Routh was chosen from thousands of candidates interviewed at casting calls in the United States, United Kingdom, Canada and Australia. He had also auditioned for Clark Kent in the television series Smallville, losing to Tom Welling. Routh had also met director Joseph "McG" Nichol for the role during pre-production of Superman: Flyby. Dana Reeve, widow of Christopher Reeve, believed Routh's physical resemblance to her late husband was striking. To obtain the muscular physique to play Superman convincingly, Routh underwent a strict bodybuilding exercise regimen. Prior to Routh's casting, Singer had X2 actor Daniel Cudmore audition. Jon Hamm, Henry Cavill, Glenn Howerton, Sam Heughan and Chris Pratt also auditioned; Cavill would later portray Superman in several DC Extended Universe films. Cavill later denied that he read for Returns and stated he only tested for McG.

Kevin Spacey was the only actor considered for Lex Luthor, because of his Academy Award-winning performance in Singer's film The Usual Suspects (1995), and friendship with Singer. The writers specifically had Spacey in mind for the part when writing the script.

For the part of Lois Lane, Spacey recommended Kate Bosworth to Singer for the role, because she had co-starred with Spacey in Beyond the Sea (2004) as Sandra Dee. Natalie Portman, Evangeline Lilly, Charisma Carpenter, Mia Kirshner, Mischa Barton, Claire Danes and Keri Russell were reportedly also considered. Amy Adams, who would later be cast as Lois Lane in the 2013 reboot Man of Steel, confirmed in an interview that she had also auditioned for Lois in 2005. Adams had previously auditioned for Lois in 2003 when Brett Ratner was planning to direct Superman: Flyby. Bosworth studied Katharine Hepburn's acting for inspiration, particularly in The Philadelphia Story (1940) and Guess Who's Coming to Dinner (1967), as well as Julia Roberts in Erin Brockovich (2000).

Hugh Laurie was originally cast as Perry White, but he was unable to film due to commitments to the TV show House, so the part went to Frank Langella.

Parker Posey was the only actress considered for the role of Kitty Kowalski.

Singer offered the role of Jimmy Olsen to Shawn Ashmore, but Ashmore declined due to his commitments to X-Men: The Last Stand; his twin brother Aaron Ashmore played the role in the TV show Smallville. The part went to Sam Huntington.

=== Filming ===
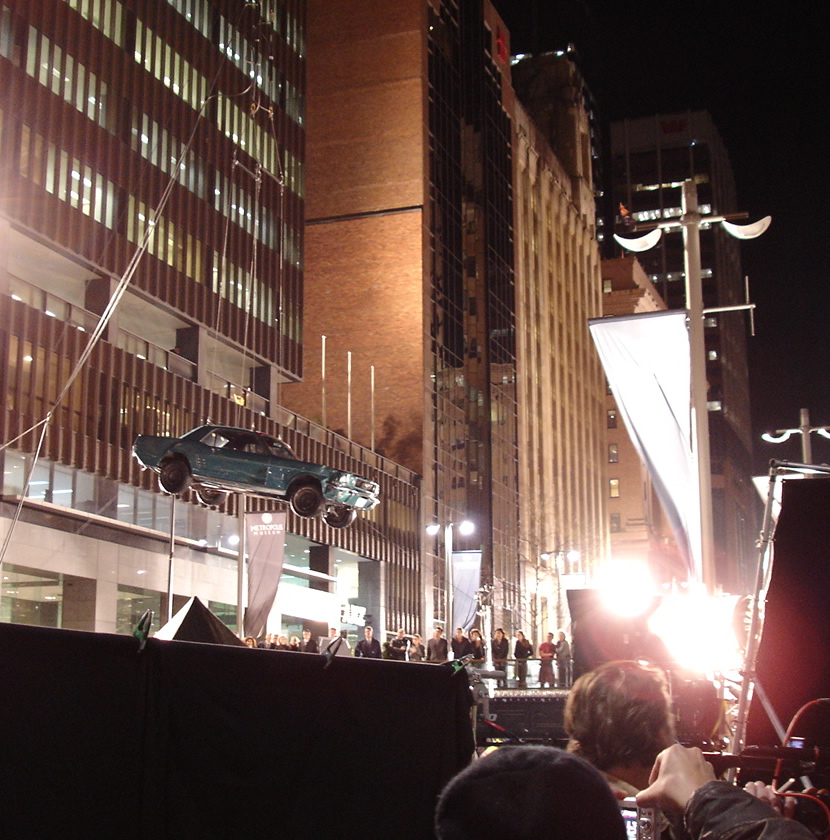
Amateur photo of the Mustang floating in the air lifted by Superman during the filming of the movie, a scene that pays homage to Action Comics #1, the character's debut issue.

Warner Bros. Pictures considered shooting Superman Returns at Village Roadshow Studios in the Gold Coast, Queensland, Australia. After filming, this could have been used as an attraction for the adjoining Warner Bros. Movie World theme park, but the idea was scrapped for being too expensive. Set construction started in January 2005 at Fox Studios Australia for the film's 60 setpieces, while the start date was pushed back for two weeks. In an attempt to avoid public attention, Superman Returns carried the fake working title of Red Sun during filming. Starting in late March 2005, principal photography lasted until November. Filming of Superman Returns in New South Wales constituted hiring thousands of local workers, generating over $100 million into the local economy. 80% of filming took place at Fox Studios Australia, occupying all nine sound stages. Scenes set in Smallville were shot at Breeza, while the Australian Museum doubled for the Metropolis Museum of Natural History.

=== Design and visual effects ===
A digital recreation of Marlon Brando in the film, as Jor-El.

Superman Returns was shot using Panavision's Genesis digital camera. Production designer Guy Hendrix Dyas was influenced by Frank Lloyd Wright's Johnson Wax Headquarters for the design of the Daily Planet. ESC Entertainment was originally set to design the visual effects sequences, but Warner Bros. replaced them with the hiring of Mark Stetson from Sony Pictures Imageworks as the visual effects supervisor. A total of 1,400 visual effects shots were created. The script required a scene of Superman safely delivering a Boeing 777 in a baseball park where computer-generated imagery was used, as it would have been impossible to assemble the number of extras for the shots. A second unit crew headed by Dan Bradley and Brian Smrz traveled to Dodger Stadium to photograph elements that were composited into the final images. The scenes of Metropolis were actually a modified version of the skyline of Manhattan. Using footage from the original Superman (1978) film as a reference point, Marlon Brando was re-created by Rhythm & Hues Studios using CGI. The opening credits for Superman Returns are presented in an intended recreation of the style used for Superman, again to the accompaniment of John Williams's theme music.

=== Music ===
Singer hired regular collaborator John Ottman as editor and film score composer months before the script was written. Ottman said in past interviews that John Williams, who composed the 1978 film, had influenced his decision to become a musician. He was both cautious and enthusiastic to work on Superman Returns. Ottman commented: "Bryan [Singer] said he wouldn't even greenlight the movie if he couldn't use the John Williams music. It was important for me to preserve the Williams theme right down to every single note for the opening titles". Ottman referred to his work on Superman Returns as a homage to, not a ripoff of, Williams.

=== Budget ===
Originally budgeted at $184.5 million, Warner Bros. placed the final production cost at $223 million, coming down to $204 million after factoring in tax rebates and incentives. Taking into account the development costs since the early 1990s, total expenditure is estimated to be around $263 million, with up to a further $100 million spent on worldwide marketing.

== Marketing ==
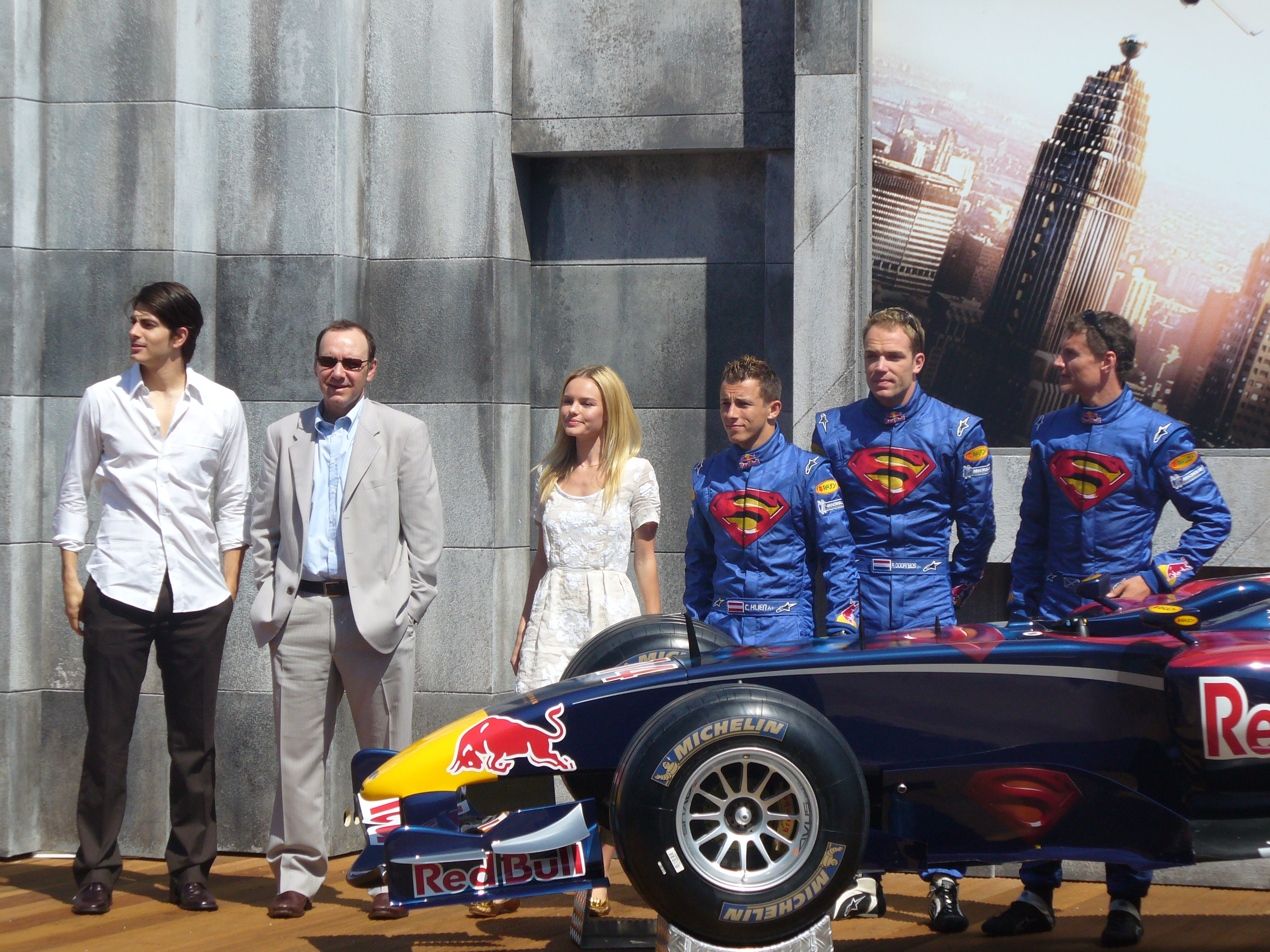
The Superman Returns cast with members of the Red Bull Racing team.

Warner Bros. promoted Superman Returns at 2005 San Diego Comic-Con. Singer and screenwriters Michael Dougherty and Dan Harris came up with the idea of publishing a prequel limited series, spanning four comic book issues. The stories were written by Jimmy Palmiotti, Marc Andreyko, and Justin Gray, with artwork by Karl Kerschl and Matt Haley. During production, a series of "video diaries" on the Internet were released at BlueTights.net, showing behind-the-scenes work being done. After 27 installments, the video diaries stopped for a while shortly before the teaser trailer debuted on November 18, 2005, with Harry Potter and the Goblet of Fire. The main theatrical trailer debuted online on May 2, 2006. That trailer appeared in theaters on May 5, with prints of Mission: Impossible III, while the international trailer came with The Da Vinci Code and X-Men: The Last Stand. DC Comics published a comics adaptation by artist Matt Haley and writer Martin Pasko, Marv Wolfman wrote a novelization, and Electronic Arts developed a video game based on both the movie and the comics.

The estimated cost of marketing Superman Returns in the United States was $45.5 million, the second-highest of the year behind Disney's $53.5 million campaign for Cars. Warner Bros. made tie-in deals with General Mills, Burger King, Cheetos, Duracell, Pepsi, Doritos, Papa John's Pizza, 7-Eleven and Colgate. The film was also advertised with Red Bull Racing Formula One cars at the 2006 Monaco Grand Prix. David Coulthard managed to get the team's first top three finish that day; on the podium, he wore a Superman cape in celebration of his achievement. NASCAR Sprint Cup champion Jeff Gordon also sported the "Man of Steel" look by promoting the movie on his #24 Chevrolet Monte Carlo in the 2006 Pepsi 400 at Daytona International Speedway. Troy Bayliss appeared in promotional "Superman" leathers and sported a cape on the podium following a win and a 2nd place at the 2006 Brands Hatch Superbike World Championship round on his way to winning that year's championship. The National Geographic Channel released The Science of Superman on June 29, 2006: a television special that studied popular science analogies with the Superman mythos. Singer admitted at 2006 Comic-Con International that he was dissatisfied with the marketing and promotion. "A lot of people did their job, and a lot didn't".

== Reception ==
=== Box office ===
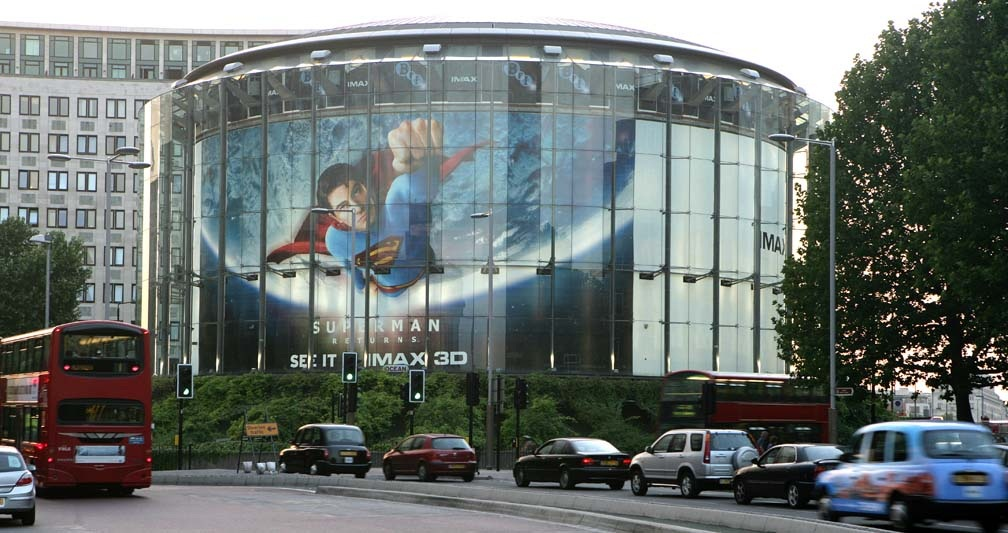
Superman Returns premiere in London.

Bryan Singer convinced Warner Bros. not to experiment with test screenings. In addition, Singer removed 15 minutes of footage from Superman Returns after showing it to some of his "trusted associates". The final theatrical time length ran at 154 minutes. Warner Bros. originally slated the movie for release on Friday, June 30, but moved it up to Wednesday, June 28. Superman Returns was released on June 28, 2006, in the United States and Canada in 4,065 theaters. During its opening day, it earned $21 million, becoming the eighth-highest Wednesday opening day and the second-highest for a superhero film, behind Spider-Man 2. The film ranked at the top in its opening weekend, grossing $52.5 million. With a total gross of $84.6 million, Superman Returns dethroned The Matrix Revolutions to have the biggest five-day Wednesday opening for a Warner Bros. film.

Superman Returns: An IMAX 3D Experience was released simultaneously in 111 IMAX-format theaters worldwide, which included 20 minutes of converted 3D film material. It was the first Hollywood full-length live-action film to be released in this combined format. One of the key scenes Singer took out was "the Return to Krypton sequence". Ten million dollars was spent on this sequence alone, but it was deleted. Singer noted that it could not be released as part of a DVD featurette because it was converted to IMAX 3D. He hoped it could have appeared in an IMAX reissue. The film's second-week gross rapidly declined by 58% from the first week, due to the presence of Pirates of the Caribbean: Dead Man's Chest and The Devil Wears Prada. By October, the film had crossed the $200 million mark, becoming the fifth film of the 2006 summer season to do so. Superman Returns went on to gross $200.1 million in North America and $191 million internationally, earning $391.1 million worldwide. Domestically, the film was the sixth-highest-grossing film of 2006. In worldwide totals, Superman Returns was ninth-highest.

=== Critical reception ===
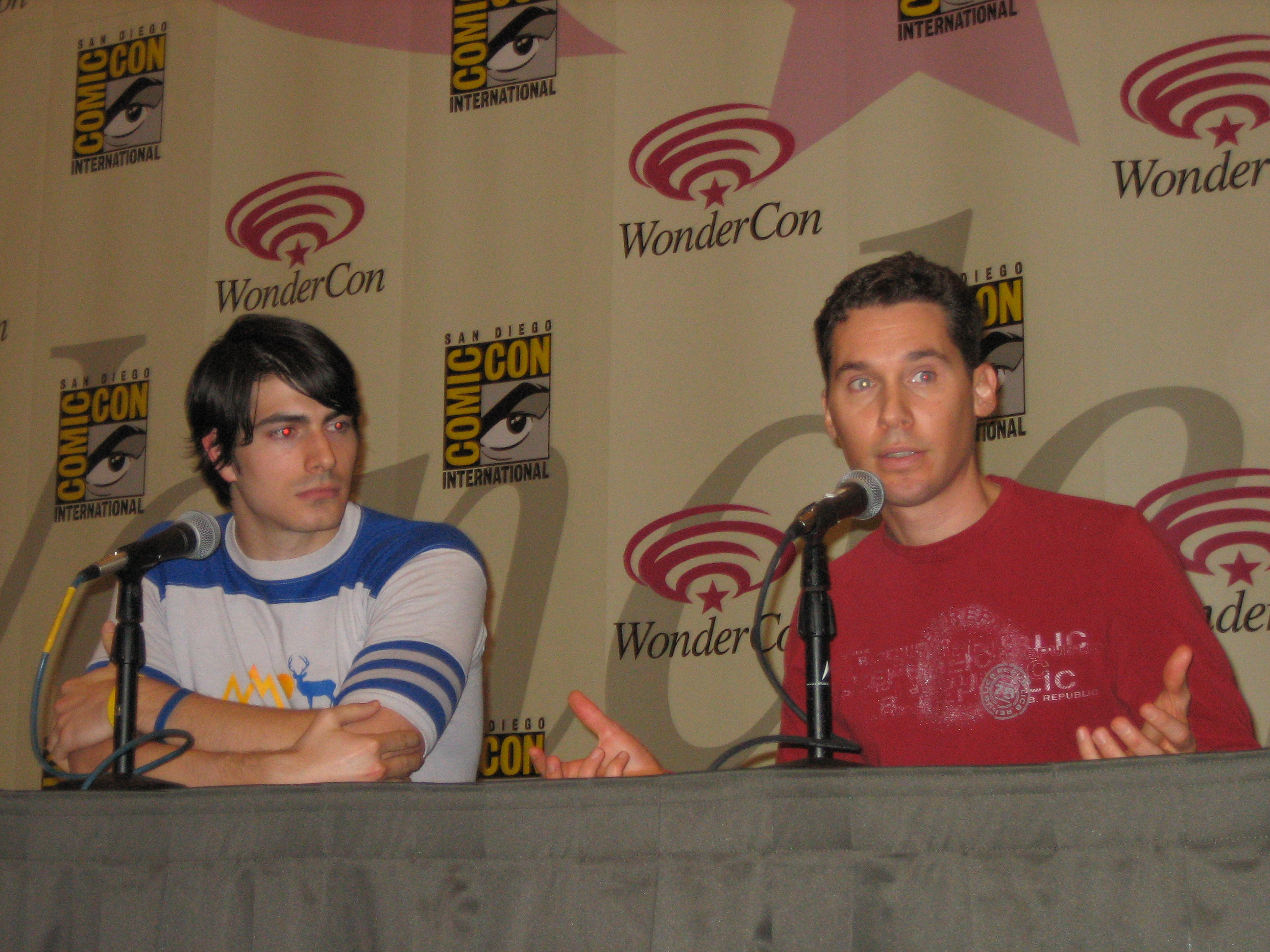
Brandon Routh and Bryan Singer at a press conference during the premiere of Superman Returns.

Journalists have described the critical reception of Superman Returns as lukewarm. On Rotten Tomatoes, Superman Returns has an approval rating of 72% based on 290 reviews, with an average rating of 7/10. The site's critical consensus reads, "Bryan Singer's reverent and visually decadent adaptation gives the Man of Steel welcome emotional complexity. The result: a satisfying stick-to-your-ribs adaptation." On Metacritic, the film has a score of 72 out of 100, based on 40 critics, indicating "generally favorable reviews". Audiences polled by CinemaScore gave the film an average grade of "B+" on an A+ to F scale.

Richard Corliss of Time praised Superman Returns, calling it one of the best superhero films. He was mostly impressed with Singer's direction and the storyline. Joe Morgenstern from The Wall Street Journal also gave a positive review, but observed Routh's and Bosworth's acting was "somewhat dead or super average. Nothing special." Morgenstern believed Lex Luthor's characterization was "well written by the writers and well played by Kevin Spacey". He also praised Newton Thomas Sigel's cinematography and Guy Hendrix Dyas's production design.

Peter Travers, writing in Rolling Stone, felt the film "perfectly updates Superman for the modern audience". J. Hoberman of The Village Voice called it "surprisingly well made. It's a summer blockbuster filled with mythology and sensitivity." James Berardinelli reacted positively to the movie, comparing it favorably with Richard Donner's 1978 film. He felt Spacey was better than Gene Hackman as Lex Luthor, describing him as "more cruel and less flippant" than Hackman. "There are no miscasts to be found in the supporting cast, either," Berardinelli said. "Superman Returns is near the top, if not at the top of the superhero movie pile. It offers nearly everything: romance, action, humor, and plenty of goose bumps."

However, Roger Ebert argued the film was a "glum, lackluster movie in which even the big effects sequences seem dutiful instead of exhilarating." He also felt that "Brandon Routh lacks charisma as Superman", surmising that he "may have been cast because he looks a little like Reeve". Mick LaSalle of the San Francisco Chronicle felt that Warner Bros. should have rebooted the series along the lines of Batman Begins. He also felt Bosworth, at 22 years old, was too young to portray Lois Lane, and the climax did not "match the potential of the tiring 154-minute-long film".

=== Other commentary ===
On May 3, 2009, almost three years after the debut of Superman Returns, filmmaker Quentin Tarantino declared his appreciation for Bryan Singer's directorial work on Superman Returns and that he would write a 20-page review about the film.

On January 9, 2012, more than five years after the movie was released, the independent film community daily news site IndieWire released a two-part video essay that probes the melancholic nature of Superman Returns. Produced by Matt Zoller Seitz and Ken Cancelosi, the critique was inspired by a review that Seitz wrote for the New York Press in 2006, in which he stated that "From the moment its hero returns to the sky to rescue Lois Lane from a plummeting jet, Superman Returns flirts with greatness."

In 2013, Singer stated that Superman Returns was made for "Perhaps more of a female audience. It wasn't what it needed to be, I guess." Singer stated that he would have cut about the first quarter off of the film and started it with "the jet disaster sequence or something. I could have grabbed the audience a little more quickly. I don't know what would have helped. Probably nothing. If I could go again, I would do an origin. I would reboot it."

Empire ranked the movie 496 on its "The 500 Greatest Movies of All Time" list, stating, "It may have been a slighter return than some people had hoped for, but Singer's vision of the Man of Steel is an heroic effort. Plenty of spectacle and a lot of heart help Kal-El soar."

=== Accolades ===
Superman Returns was nominated for both the Academy Award for Best Visual Effects and BAFTA Award for Best Special Visual Effects, losing to Pirates of the Caribbean: Dead Man's Chest. The film was successful at the 33rd Saturn Awards, winning Best Fantasy Film, and categories for Direction (Bryan Singer), Best Actor (Brandon Routh), Writing (Michael Dougherty and Dan Harris) and Music (John Ottman). Kate Bosworth, Tristan Lake Leabu, James Marsden, Parker Posey, and the visual effects department were nominated for categories. However, Bosworth was also nominated a Razzie Award for Worst Supporting Actress.

Year	Award	Category	Recipient	Result
2007	79th Academy Awards	Best Visual Effects	Superman Returns	Nominated
2007	BAFTAs	Best Special Visual Effects	Superman Returns	Nominated
2007	27th Golden Raspberry Awards	Worst Supporting Actress	Kate Bosworth	Nominated
2007	33rd Saturn Awards	Best Actor	Brandon Routh	Won
2007	33rd Saturn Awards	Best Actress	Kate Bosworth	Nominated
2007	33rd Saturn Awards	Best Supporting Actor	James Marsden	Nominated
2007	33rd Saturn Awards	Best Supporting Actress	Parker Posey	Nominated
2007	33rd Saturn Awards	Best Young Actor	Tristan Lake Leabu	Nominated
2007	33rd Saturn Awards	Best Score	John Ottman	Won
2007	33rd Saturn Awards	Best Visual Effects	Superman Returns	Nominated
2007	33rd Saturn Awards	Best Screenplay	Michael Dougherty & Dan Harris	Won
2007	33rd Saturn Awards	Best Director	Bryan Singer	Won
2007	33rd Saturn Awards	Best Fantasy Film	Superman Returns	Won

== Home media ==
Superman Returns debuted on DVD on November 28, 2006, in two versions, one with a single-disc edition and a double-disc edition which featured over three hours of behind-the-scenes features. That same day, a 14-disc DVD box set titled Superman Ultimate Collector's Edition was released, containing special editions of all five Superman films, as well as the documentary Look, Up in the Sky: The Amazing Story of Superman. It debuted at the top spot of the DVD charts, and also generated $13 million in rentals during its first week. The film was also released in both high-definition formats, HD DVD, which featured both standard and high definitions on the same disc, and Blu-ray. It was the best-selling title on both formats in 2006, and was among the best-sellers of both formats of 2007.

== Legacy ==
=== Cancelled sequel ===
In February 2006, four months before the release of Superman Returns, Warner Bros. announced a mid-2009 theatrical release date for a sequel, with Bryan Singer reprising his directing duties. Brandon Routh, Kate Bosworth, Kevin Spacey, Sam Huntington, Frank Langella, and Tristan Lake Leabu were to reprise their roles. Due to his commitment, Singer dropped out of directing a remake of Logan's Run and an adaptation of The Mayor of Castro Street. Writer Michael Dougherty wanted the sequel to be "action packed", featuring "other Kryptonians" with Brainiac and Bizarro also considered for primary villains. The "New Krypton" landmass floating in space at the end of Superman Returns would have served as a plot device. Although Superman Returns received mostly positive reviews, Warner Bros. and Legendary Pictures were disappointed by the film's box office return. Warner Bros. President Alan F. Horn explained that Superman Returns was a very successful film, but that it "should have done $500 million worldwide. We should have had perhaps a little more action to satisfy the young male crowd." Singer reacted incredulously to the studio complaints, saying, "That movie made $400 million! I don't know what constitutes under-performing these days ..." $175 million was the maximum budget Warner Bros. was projecting for the sequel, as Superman Returns cost $204 million.

Filming for the Superman Returns sequel was to start in mid-2007, before Singer halted development in favor of Valkyrie. Filming was then pushed to March 2008, but writers Dougherty and Dan Harris left in favor of other career opportunities. The 2007–2008 Writers Guild of America strike pushed the release date to 2010. Singer still listed the sequel as a priority in March 2008, saying that the film was in early development. Routh expected filming to begin in early 2009. Paul Levitz, president of DC Comics, expected Routh to reprise the title role from Superman Returns before his contract for a sequel expired in 2009. However, with Warner Bros. deciding to reboot the film series, Singer dropped out in favor of directing Jack the Giant Slayer. In August 2008, Warner Bros. President of Production Jeff Robinov reflected, "Superman Returns didn't quite work as a film in the way that we wanted it to. It didn't position the character the way he needed to be positioned. Had Superman worked in 2006, we would have had a movie for Christmas of this year or 2009. Now the plan is just to reintroduce Superman without regard to a Batman and Superman movie at all."

=== Arrowverse ===
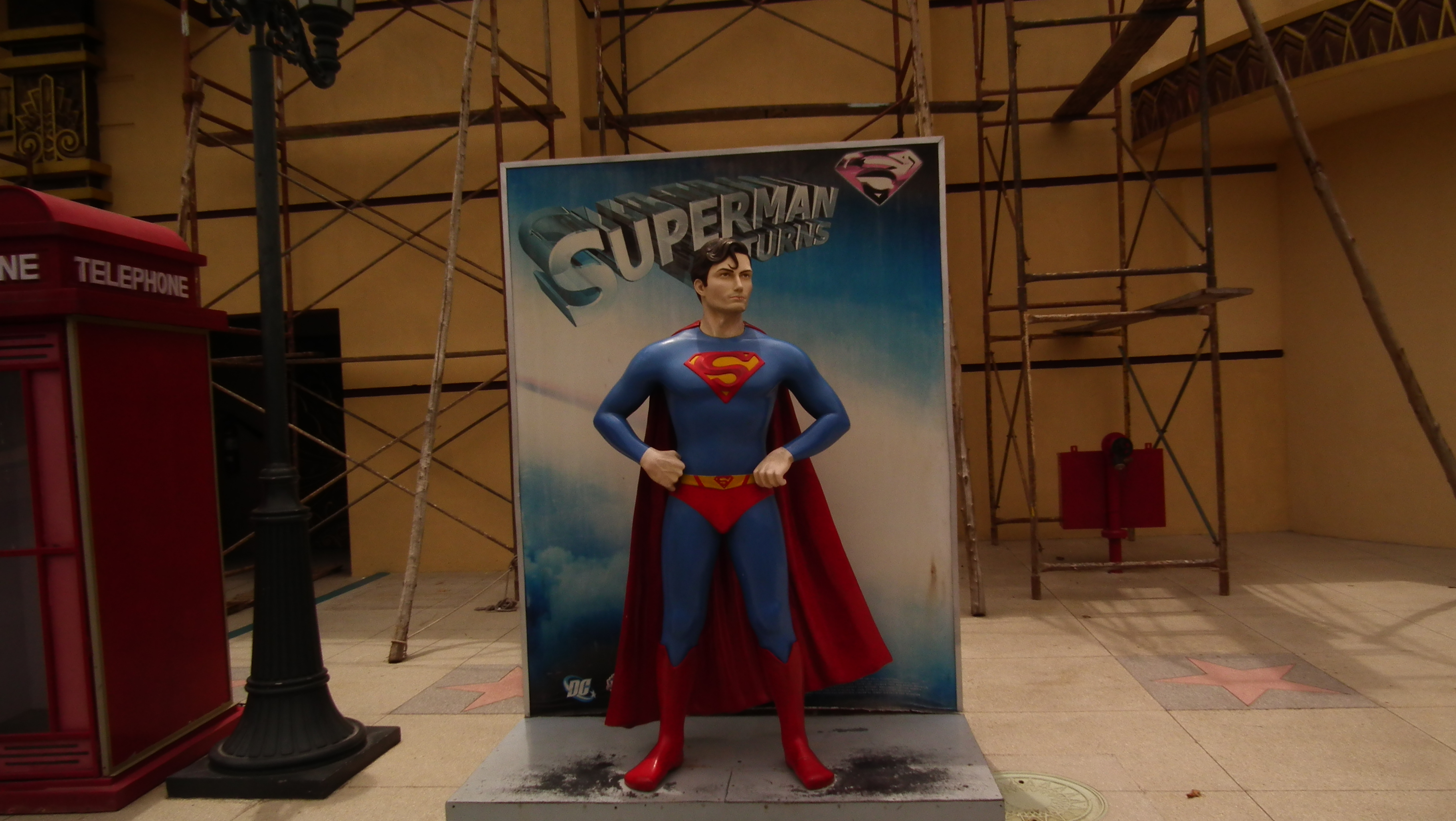
Photo from Ramoji Tower at Ramoji Film city, Hyderabad.

Brandon Routh reprised his role as Clark Kent / Superman in the 2019 Arrowverse TV series crossover "Crisis on Infinite Earths", in addition to playing Ray Palmer / The Atom, a character he introduced on Arrow and played on Legends of Tomorrow. Executive producer Marc Guggenheim was reluctant to call Routh's crossover appearance a sequel when addressing whether the character's appearance would constitute a sequel to Superman Returns. "I don't know if it's for me to say. We're picking up so many years after the events of that movie, maybe a coda is a better word than sequel."

Set on Earth-96 in the multiverse of the Arrowverse, this version of Superman has become an aged and beleaguered superhero similar to the iteration from the DC Comics' mini-series Kingdom Come; adopting a black belt and an S-shield with a black background as a sign of mourning after losing his friends, notably Perry White and Jimmy Olsen, as well as his wife Lois (having been married at some point after revealing his secrets to her) to a terrorist attack on the Daily Planet by a psychopath from Gotham City. He is also similar to another iteration, Kal-L (who remained working as a newspaper's editor-in-chief instead of going into seclusion after what happened), making this Superman an amalgam of the two, as well as being a facsimile of Ray Palmer as a multiversal counterpart. As the Monitor recruited heroes from across the multiverse to avert a Crisis caused by the Anti-Monitor, he specifically wanted to find "a Kryptonian who suffered a greater loss than most mortal men could endure," called the Paragon of Truth. During the event, Superman also references the events from Superman III when the good Clark Kent fought an evil version of Superman, as well as his son Jason (implying that he had discovered his true paternity) from Superman Returns, which implies the Arrowverse retconned the Reeve/Routh Superman continuity so that Superman III, and possibly even Superman IV: The Quest for Peace and Supergirl, did happen after all, and possibly now take place after Superman Returns. After the Anti-Monitor Crisis was averted and a new multiverse was created, Superman of Earth-96 is seen wearing a yellow S-shield and belt as he flies away.

== See also ==
- Superman in film
