= Brian Smrz =

American film director (born 1959/60)

- Born: 1959 or 1960 (age 65–66); Strafford, Pennsylvania
- Occupations: Stunt coordinator, second-unit director, director

Brian Smrz (/smɜːrʃ/; born c. 1960), also Brian Delaney Smrz, is a Hollywood stunt coordinator and second unit director of projects such as Mission: Impossible 2, Live Free or Die Hard, Taxi, Eagle Eye, Night at the Museum, Windtalkers, Iron Man 3, and Superman Returns, among others. He is also the director of Hero Wanted, starring Cuba Gooding, Jr. and Ray Liotta and of 24 Hours to Live, starring Ethan Hawke and Xu Qing. He won the Taurus Award twice and was nominated for a third time.

== Career ==
Smrz has worked as a stunt performer and stunt coordinator on Hollywood films since 1981. In more recent years, he has acted as second unit director and director on projects such as Hero Wanted, Fantastic Four, Ghostbusters: Afterlife, The Predator, and Face/Off. He has worked on several of director John Woo's American films, including Windtalkers, Paycheck and Mission: Impossible 2.

Smrz shared a Taurus Award for stuntwork on Mission: Impossible 2 and Live Free or Die Hard. He was also nominated for Taxi. In an otherwise negative review of Taxi, Variety praised Smrz's stunts.

Hero Wanted is his directorial debut. It is a crime drama/action film starring Cuba Gooding, Jr., Ray Liotta and Norman Reedus. Shooting occurred in Sofia and Bulgaria with a crew composed mostly of Bulgarians.

== Personal life ==
Smrz is from Strafford, Pennsylvania and was the brother of the stuntman Brett Smrz, who died while performing a stunt jump off a building. Smrz was hospitalized after a stunt went wrong in 1992 on Cyborg 2. The incident was investigated by the Screen Actors Guild.

== Filmography ==
Year	Title	Stunt coordinator	Second unit director	Director
2000	Mission: Impossible II	Yes	Yes	John Woo
2001	Vanilla Sky	Yes	No	Cameron Crowe
2002	Windtalkers	Yes	Yes	John Woo
2002	Signs	Yes	No	M. Night Shyamalan
2002	Minority Report	Yes	Yes	Steven Spielberg
2003	X2	No	Yes	Bryan Singer
2003	Paycheck	No	Yes	John Woo
2004	Taxi	Yes	Yes	Tim Story
2005	Fantastic Four	No	Yes	Tim Story
2006	Superman Returns	No	Yes	Bryan Singer
2006	Night at the Museum	No	Yes	Shawn Levy
2007	Live Free or Die Hard	Yes	Yes	Len Wiseman
2008	Eagle Eye	No	Yes	D.J. Caruso
2009	Surrogates	No	Yes	Jonathan Mostow
2009	X-Men Origins: Wolverine	Yes	No	Gavin Hood
2009	Whiteout	No	Yes	Dominic Sena
2010	Knight and Day	No	Yes	James Mangold
2011	The Hangover Part II	No	Yes	Todd Phillips
2011	X-Men: First Class	No	Yes	Matthew Vaughn
2011	Rise of the Planet of the Apes	No	Yes	Matt Reeves
2012	This Means War	No	Yes	McG
2013	Iron Man 3	No	Yes	Shane Black
2014	X-Men: Days of Future Past	No	Yes	Bryan Singer
2015	Fantastic Four	No	Yes	Josh Trank
2016	X-Men: Apocalypse	No	Yes	Bryan Singer
2017	The Predator	Yes	Yes	Shane Black
2019	Dark Phoenix	No	Yes	Simon Kinberg
2020	Loves and Monsters	No	Yes	Michael Matthews
2021	Venom: Let There Be Carnage	No	Yes	Andy Serkis
2021	Ghostbusters: Afterlife	No	Yes	Jason Reitman
2022	The Adam Project	Yes	Yes	Shawn Levy
2023	Shazam! Fury of the Gods	No	Yes	David F. Sandberg
2023	Expend4bles	No	Yes	Scott Waugh
2024	Venom: The Last Dance	No	Yes	Kelly Marcel
