= Characters of the DC Extended Universe =

The heroes as seen in Zack Snyder's Justice League (2021). From left to right: Cyborg, Flash, Batman, Superman, Wonder Woman, and Aquaman.

The DC Extended Universe (DCEU) is a shared universe centered on a group of film franchises based on characters by DC Comics and distributed by Warner Bros. Pictures. Despite numerous separate film franchises being released in the past based on single characters such as Superman and Batman, none of those film series were interconnected. The DCEU debuted in 2013 with Man of Steel, centered on Superman, and has grown to include other characters such as Batman, Wonder Woman, and several others included in this list. The shared universe, much like the original DC Universe in the comics, was established by crossing over common plot elements, settings, cast, and characters, and crossed over with separate timelines from other DC-licensed film series in The Flash to create a "multiverse" before being largely rebooted as the new DC Universe franchise under new management from DC Studios, with the previous universe concluding in 2023 with Aquaman and the Lost Kingdom.

== Central characters ==
The DCEU centers mostly on superhero characters, including the members of what would become the Justice League, but also features antiheroes such as Floyd Lawton / Deadshot, Harleen Quinzel / Harley Quinn, Robert DuBois / Bloodsport, Christopher Smith / Peacemaker, and Teth-Adam / Black Adam.

=== Kal-El / Clark Kent / Superman ===
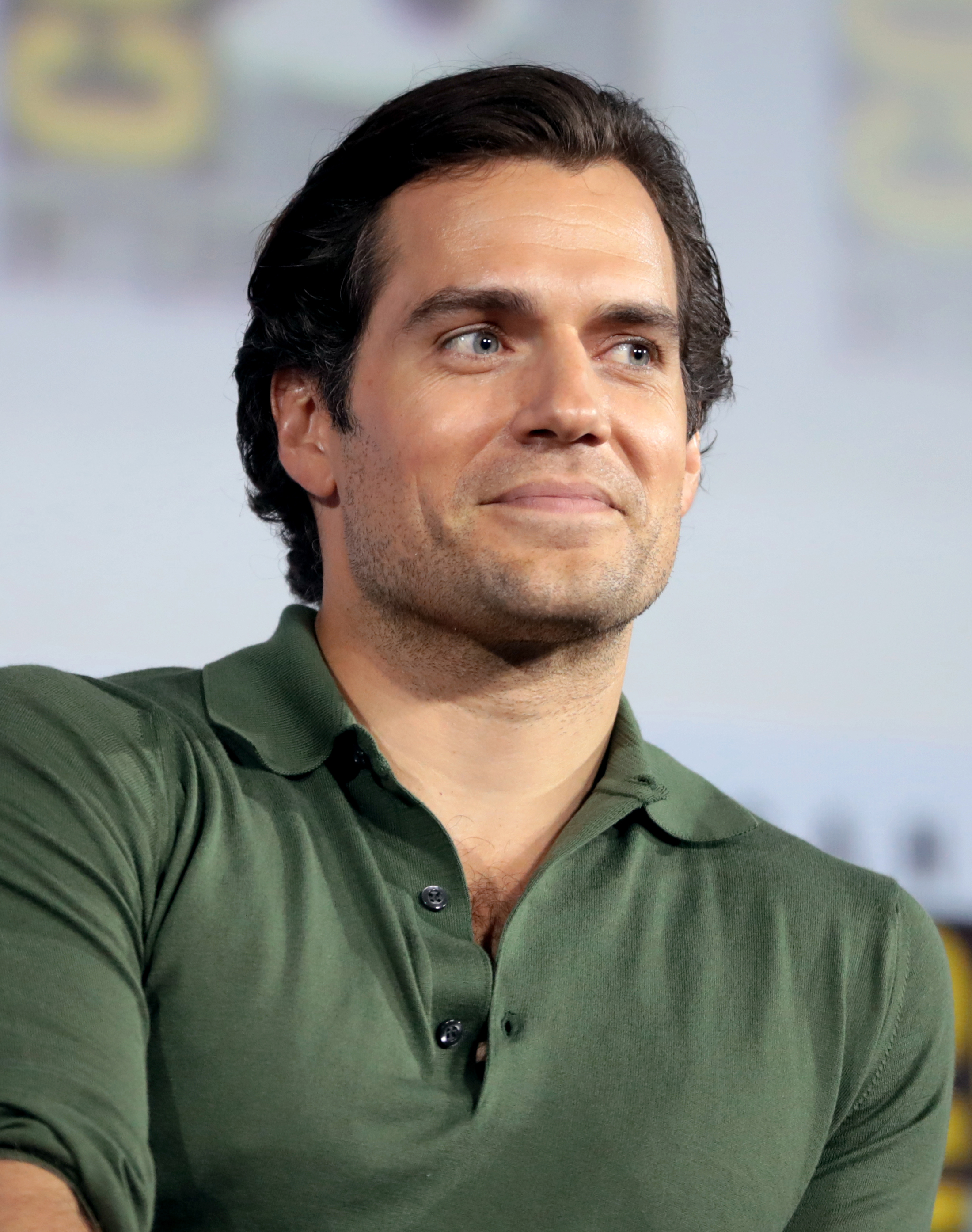
Henry Cavill

Clark Kent (portrayed by Henry Cavill), born Kal-El, is a Kryptonian refugee sent to Earth by his parents Jor-El and Lara Lor-Van prior to the planet's destruction and is raised by Jonathan and Martha Kent in Smallville, Kansas. As the Sun's radiation enhances his cells, Clark develops superhuman abilities, but struggles with his identity when Jonathan reveals his otherworldly origins. After Jonathan's death, Clark travels the world trying to find himself and eventually discovers his true identity after finding a Kryptonian scout ship. He eventually embraces his powers after learning from his biological father's hologram, gaining the military codename Superman as he uses his powers to protect the Earth's citizens. Superman eventually comes to odds with Batman before finding commonality and inspires Batman and other vigilantes and metahumans to band together and protect the world from greater threats.

Cavill is the first non-American actor to portray Superman in film. In addition, Zack Snyder has aimed to give Superman a more realistic arc in his DCEU films as opposed to in the past and not be a "one-dimensional Boy Scout". His tenure of performances lasting for nearly a decade, Cavill reprised his role for the final time in a cameo appearance in Black Adam (2022).

=== Bruce Wayne / Batman ===
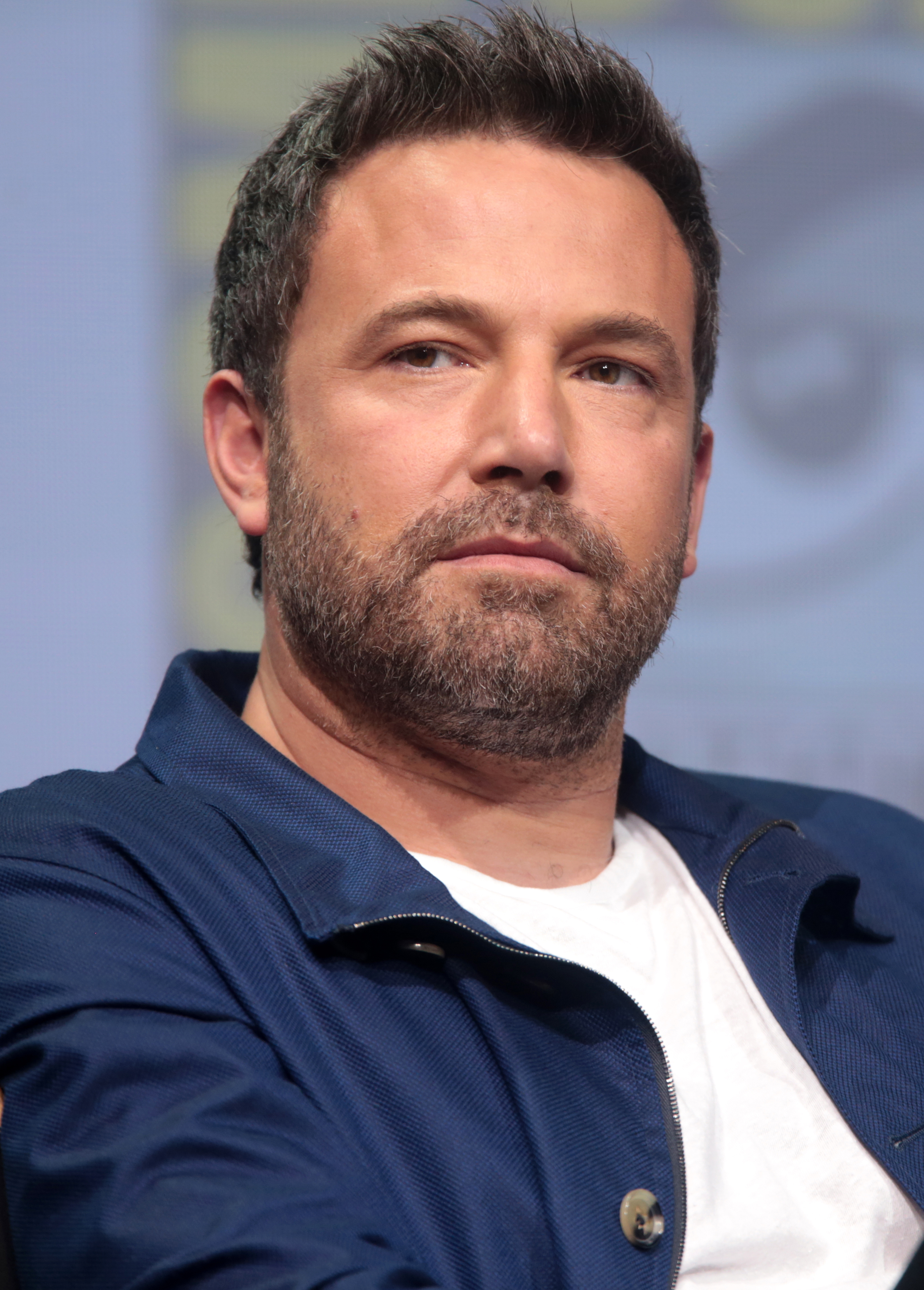
Ben Affleck

Bruce Wayne (portrayed by Ben Affleck) is the multibillionaire CEO of Wayne Enterprises, but secretly moonlights as the feared vigilante Batman in an effort to battle crime in Gotham City, taking inspiration from his parents' deaths and his fear of bats to crack down on criminal activity. He has been active as Batman for 20 years prior to Clark Kent's emergence as Superman, becoming jaded and disillusioned over time, especially after the murder of his protégé Robin. Bruce antagonizes Superman after personally witnessing the Battle of Metropolis, in which the ruckus caused by the Kryptonians destroys a considerable part of the city, including the destruction of Wayne Tower and the deaths of a large portion of Wayne's workforce in Metropolis. He is determined to kill the Man of Steel until finding commonality with him and later becomes inspired by Superman's selflessness and sacrifice, later recruiting other metahumans around the globe to form the Justice League and embarking on a path to redemption after years of moral ambiguity.

The DCEU iteration of Batman is notably older and more battle-weary than previous cinematic portrayals. Affleck's Batman is described as the "angriest we'd ever seen" by Screen Rant, and was inspired by Frank Miller's The Dark Knight Returns comic storyline.

=== Diana Prince / Wonder Woman ===
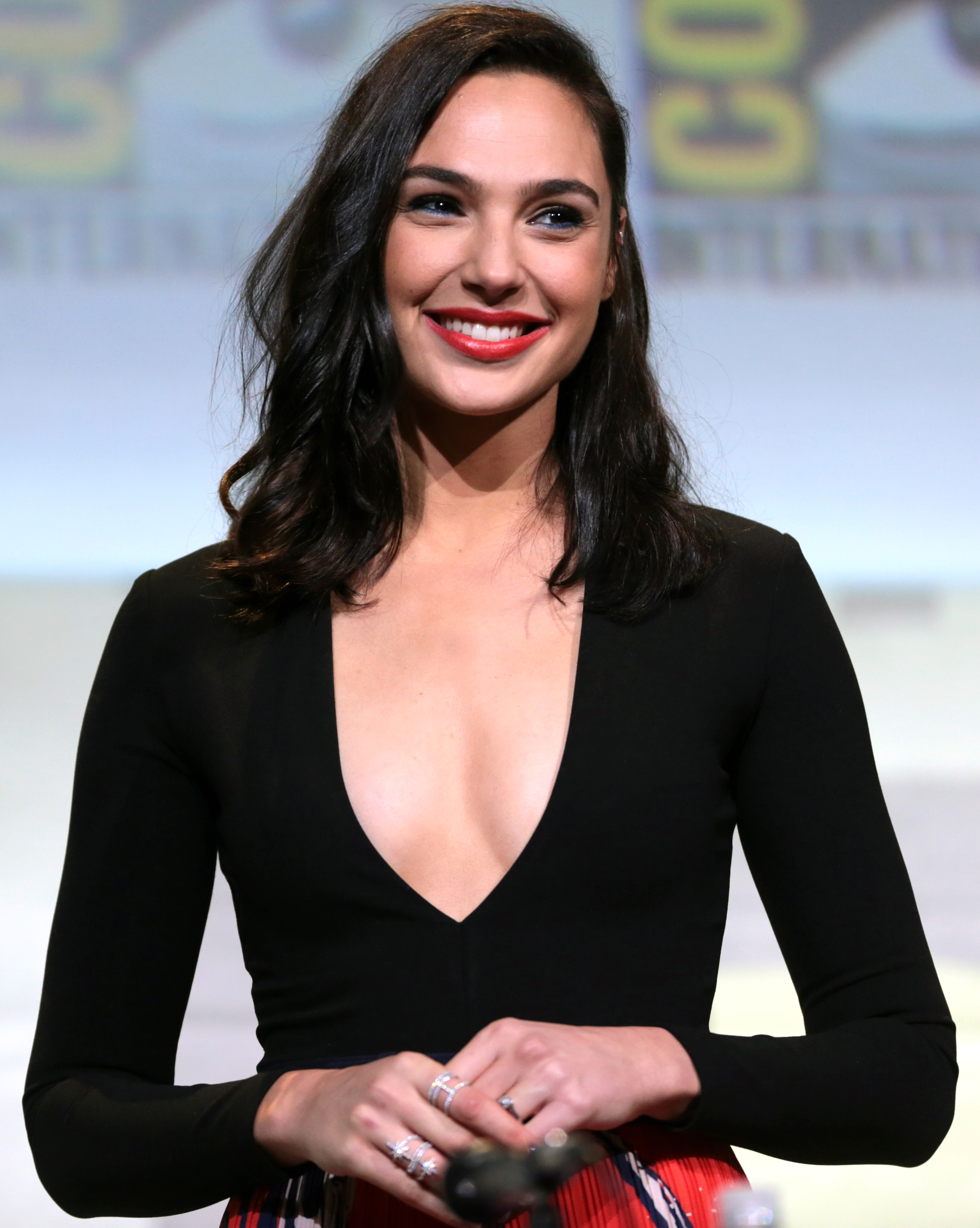
Gal Gadot

Diana of Themyscira (portrayed by Gal Gadot), commonly known by her civilian name Diana Prince, is an immortal Amazon warrior from the hidden island of Themyscira who is the daughter of Hippolyta, the queen of the Amazons and the Greek God, Zeus, the king of the Olympians. Upon venturing to the world of Men after Steve Trevor crash-lands on Themyscira and warns of a global conflict threatening the world, Diana begins protecting mankind as Wonder Woman, secretly living amongst humanity while ending conflicts for nearly 100 years and gradually learning more about the world after living a sheltered life on Themyscira. Diana is inspired by Steve's bravery and learns to find the goodness in mankind, despite evil existing in the world. She is brought back to the forefront after an extraterrestrial threat emerges, with Bruce Wayne recruiting her and other metahumans to fight against the forces of Apokolips.

Despite being part of DC Comics' main "trinity" of superhero characters alongside Superman and Batman, Wonder Woman did not debut on the silver screen until her appearance in Batman v Superman in 2016. Gadot was originally offered the role of Faora in Man of Steel, but turned it down due to pregnancy at the time. This paved the way for her casting as Wonder Woman, with Zack Snyder saying she had the "magical quality" that made her perfect for the role.

=== Arthur Curry / Aquaman ===
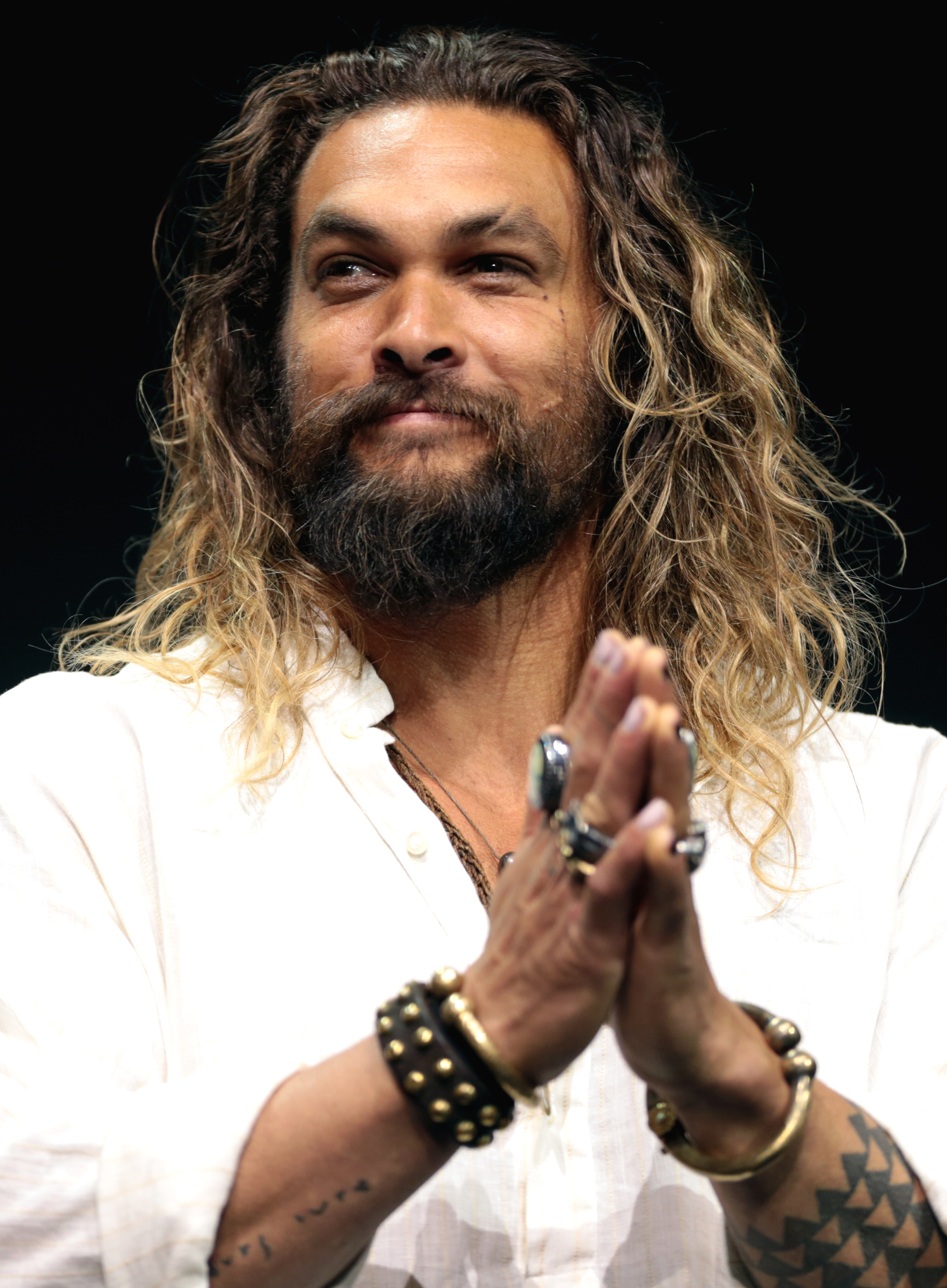
Jason Momoa

Arthur Curry (portrayed by Jason Momoa) is a brooding metahuman with aquatic superpowers, later gaining the moniker Aquaman. The son of, Thomas “Tom” Curry, a human lighthouse keeper and Atlanna, queen of Atlantis, Curry is portrayed as a reluctant hero. Dealing with his dual identity, he chooses to hide among humanity despite helping in small doses. After being sought out by Batman to join the Justice League and stop Steppenwolf, Arthur is later called by his old mentor Nuidis Vulko and Mera to claim his rightful spot as King of Atlantis, regaining confidence in himself.

Aquaman was heavily redesigned in the DCEU, sporting tattoos and a gruff demeanor as opposed to his comics counterpart who is often ridiculed due to his campy depiction in previous adaptations of the source material. Critics have described this iteration of the character as an extension of the "larger than life actor who portrays him, Jason Momoa".

=== Barry Allen / The Flash ===
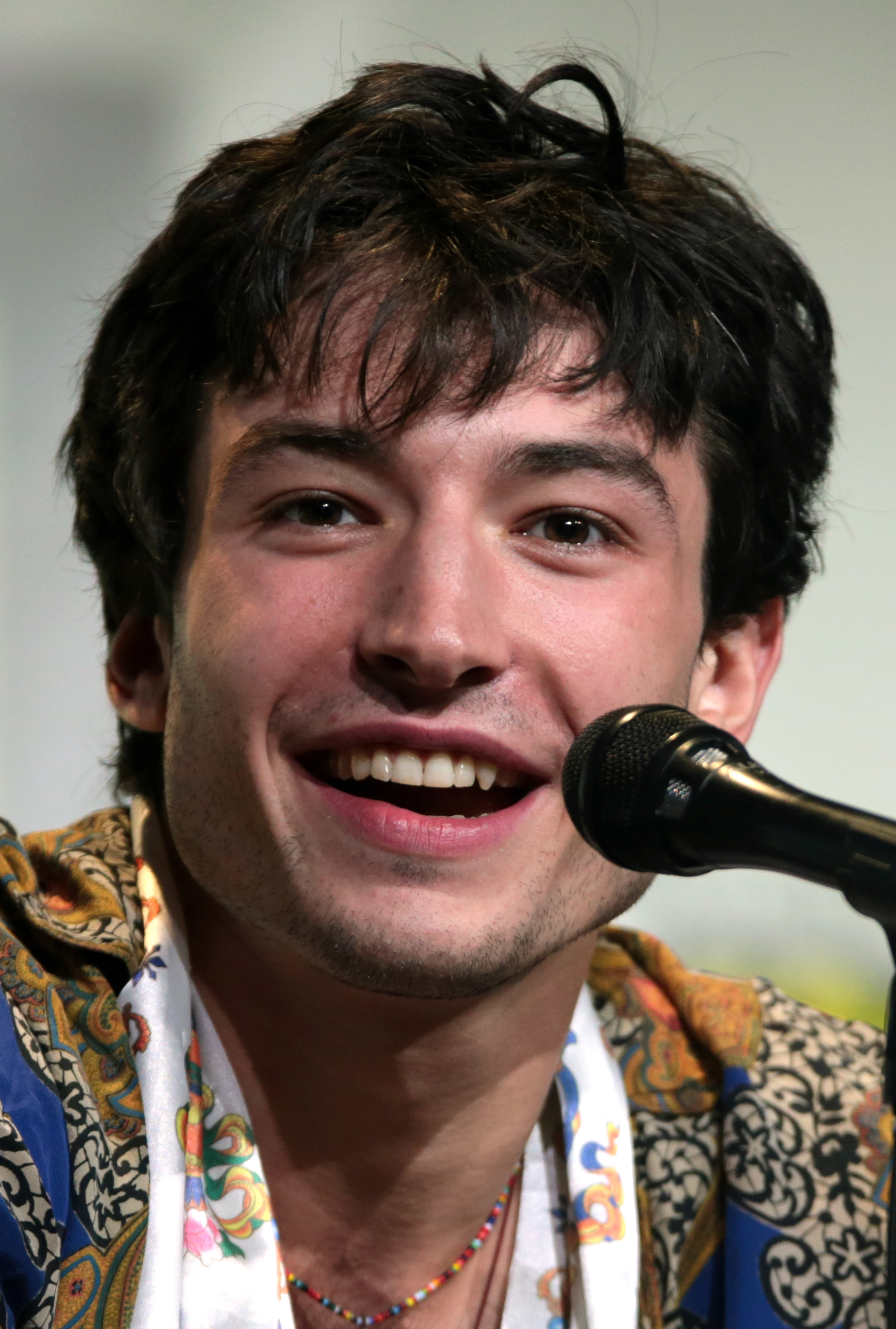
Ezra Miller

Barry Allen (portrayed by Ezra Miller) is a college student and a metahuman with the ability to move at supersonic speeds, along with time-traveling abilities. As his father Henry was wrongly convicted of murdering his wife and Barry's mother Nora, Barry seeks to prove his father's innocence while occasionally engaging in vigilantism with his superpowers. Batman discovers Barry upon recruiting metahumans to join the Justice League upon the forces of Apokolips arriving on Earth. First cast in 2014, Miller made cameo appearances in Batman v Superman: Dawn of Justice (2016) and Suicide Squad (2016) before appearing properly in Justice League (2017) and the 2021 director's cut Zack Snyder's Justice League. Miller would later make future appearances as the character in the Arrowverse crossover Crisis on Infinite Earths (2019–2020) and the season one finale of Peacemaker. Miller reprised the role in The Flash (2023), the first ever solo film for the character.

=== Victor Stone / Cyborg ===
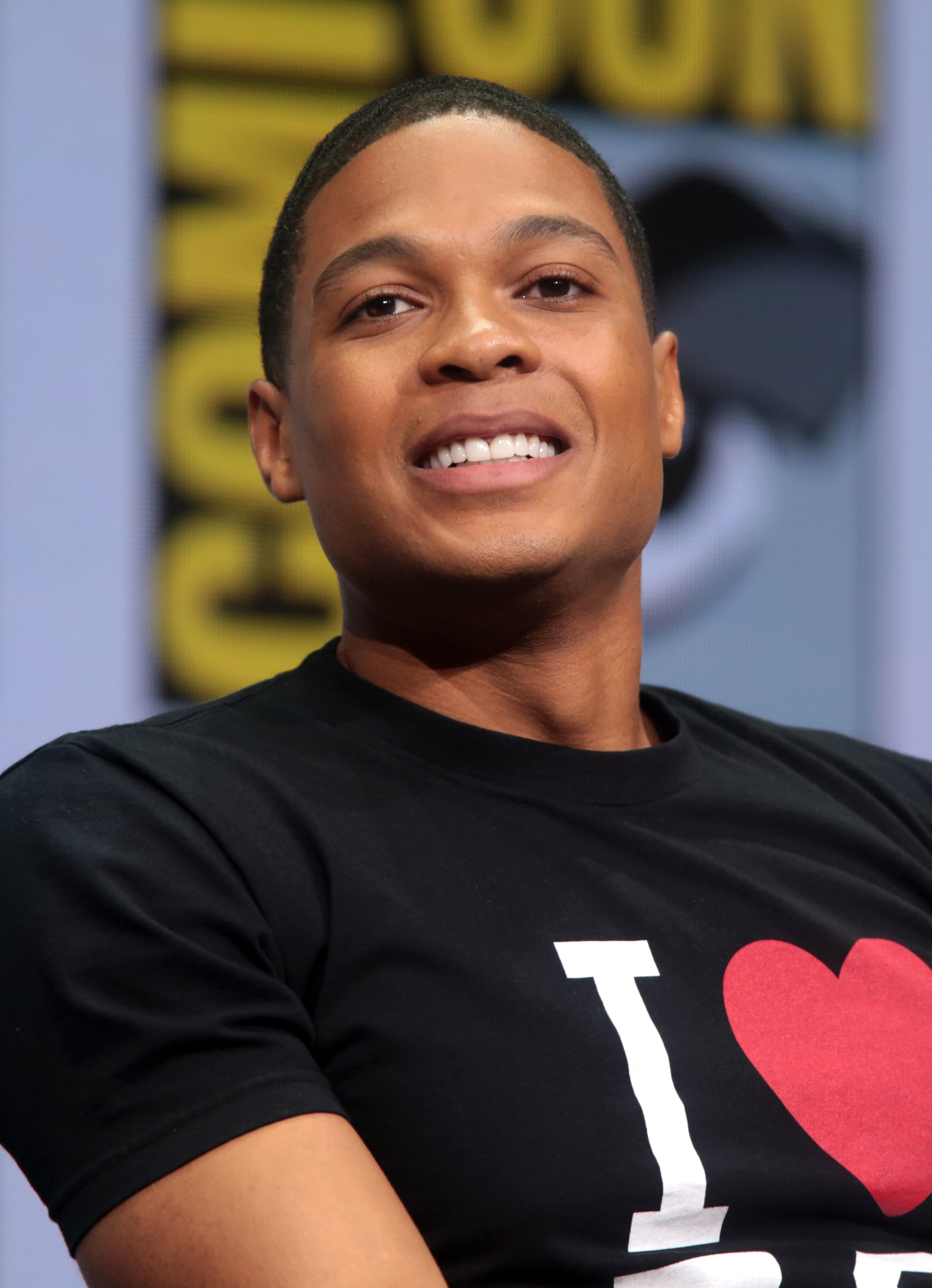
Ray Fisher

Victor Stone (portrayed by Ray Fisher) is a former college football player who suffers devastating injuries in a car accident that also kills his mother, Elinore. Rebuilt into a cyborg by his estranged father, Silas, Victor is recruited by Wonder Woman and Batman to join the Justice League. Initially refusing to join at first, he joins the team after his father is endangered and the device that rebuilt him, one of three Mother Boxes, is being sought by Steppenwolf. Victor provides the team key intel on the devices, and while working with the League, he learns to trust others again, overcome his trauma, and use his new abilities for the greater good, becoming instrumental in stopping Steppenwolf from xenoforming Earth with the Mother Boxes. Following the battle, he accepts his new abilities and potential as Cyborg.

Cyborg's character development in the theatrical cut of Justice League was controversially cut down and minimalized by the studio and replacement director Joss Whedon, despite the character being described as the "heart of the movie" in Zack Snyder's original version, which has since been released as Zack Snyder's Justice League. Fisher's performance in the latter version of the film has received critical acclaim. Prior to landing the role, Fisher was a little-known theater actor.

=== Billy Batson / Shazam ===
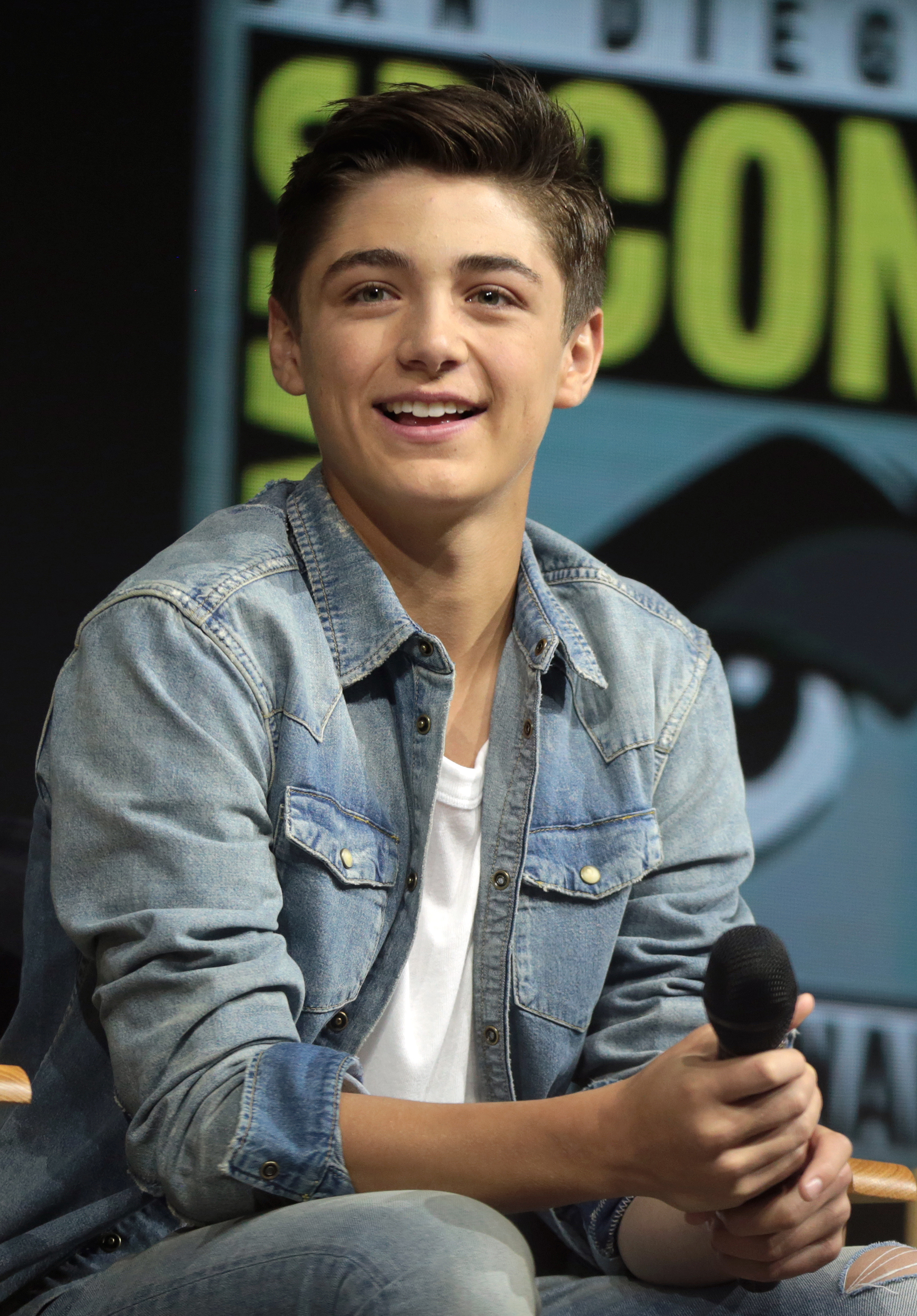
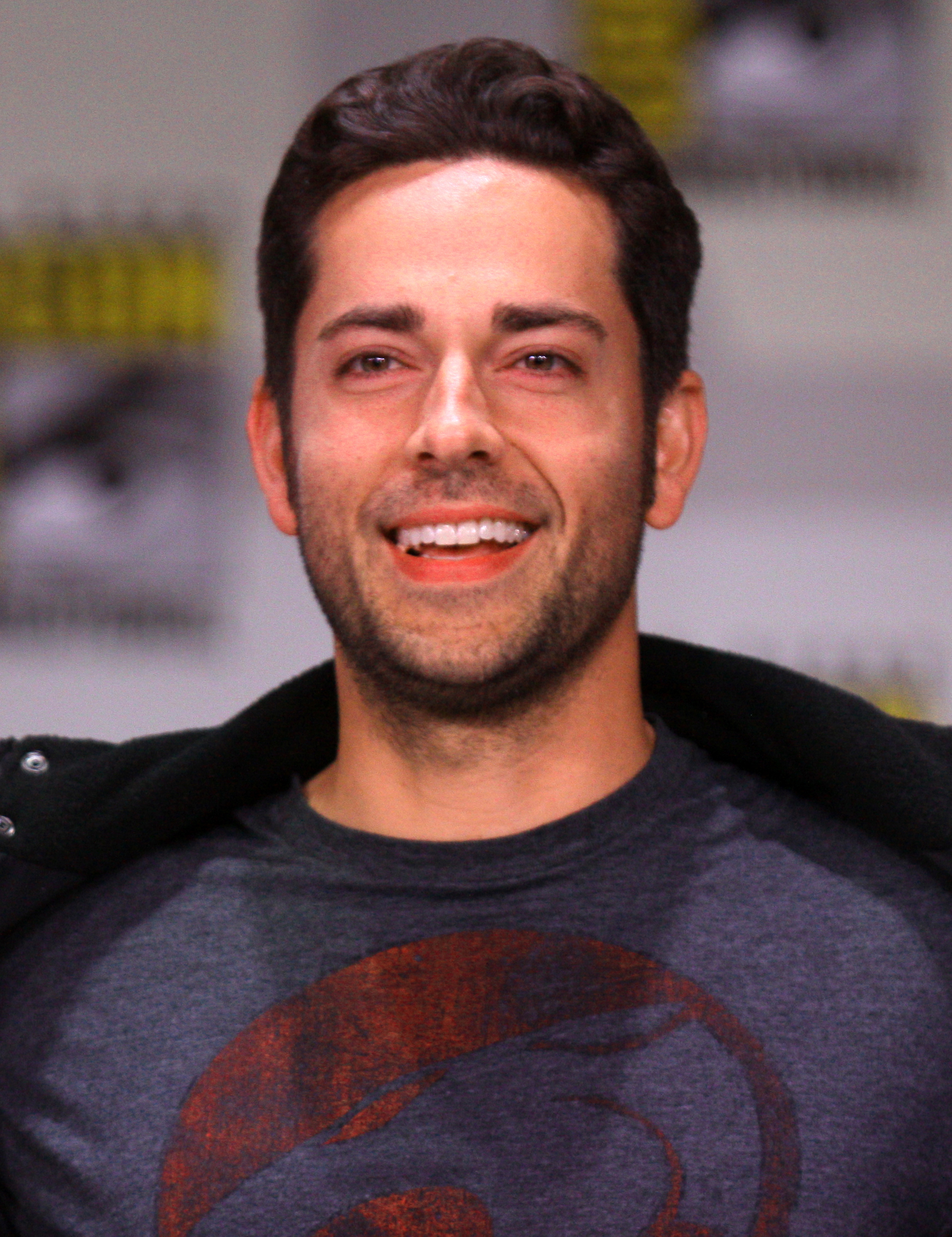
Asher Angel (left) and Zachary Levi portray Billy Batson/Shazam in their teenage and adult forms, respectively.

Billy Batson (portrayed by Asher Angel) is a mischievous and troubled teenager from Philadelphia in the foster-care system. Having been abandoned at a carnival at a young age by his single mother, Marilyn, Billy has gained a reputation as a "problem child", repeatedly escaping from foster homes and hijacking police cruisers to locate his mother. After being apprehended again, Billy is placed into the home of the Vazquez family, which also has other foster children such as Freddy Freeman and Mary Bromfield. Upon returning from school on the subway, he is contacted by the dying wizard Shazam, who bestows his powers to Billy after deeming him worthy as his champion.

Gaining the ability to transform into an adult superhero (portrayed by Zachary Levi) upon calling the name "Shazam", Billy creates a YouTube channel with Freddy to display his superpowers and continues to act mischievously until friction occurs with his foster siblings and Doctor Sivana emerges, being envious of Billy's powers and wanting them himself after being denied by Shazam earlier. Billy realizes the importance of using his powers for good, battling Sivana and the Seven Deadly Sins with little success at first. After he learns why his mother abandoned him, Billy accepts his foster family as his true family, sharing his superpowers with his siblings and creating the Shazam Family, which allows them all to defeat Sivana and imprison the Seven Deadly Sins and fully staff Shazam's temple.

=== Harleen Quinzel / Harley Quinn ===
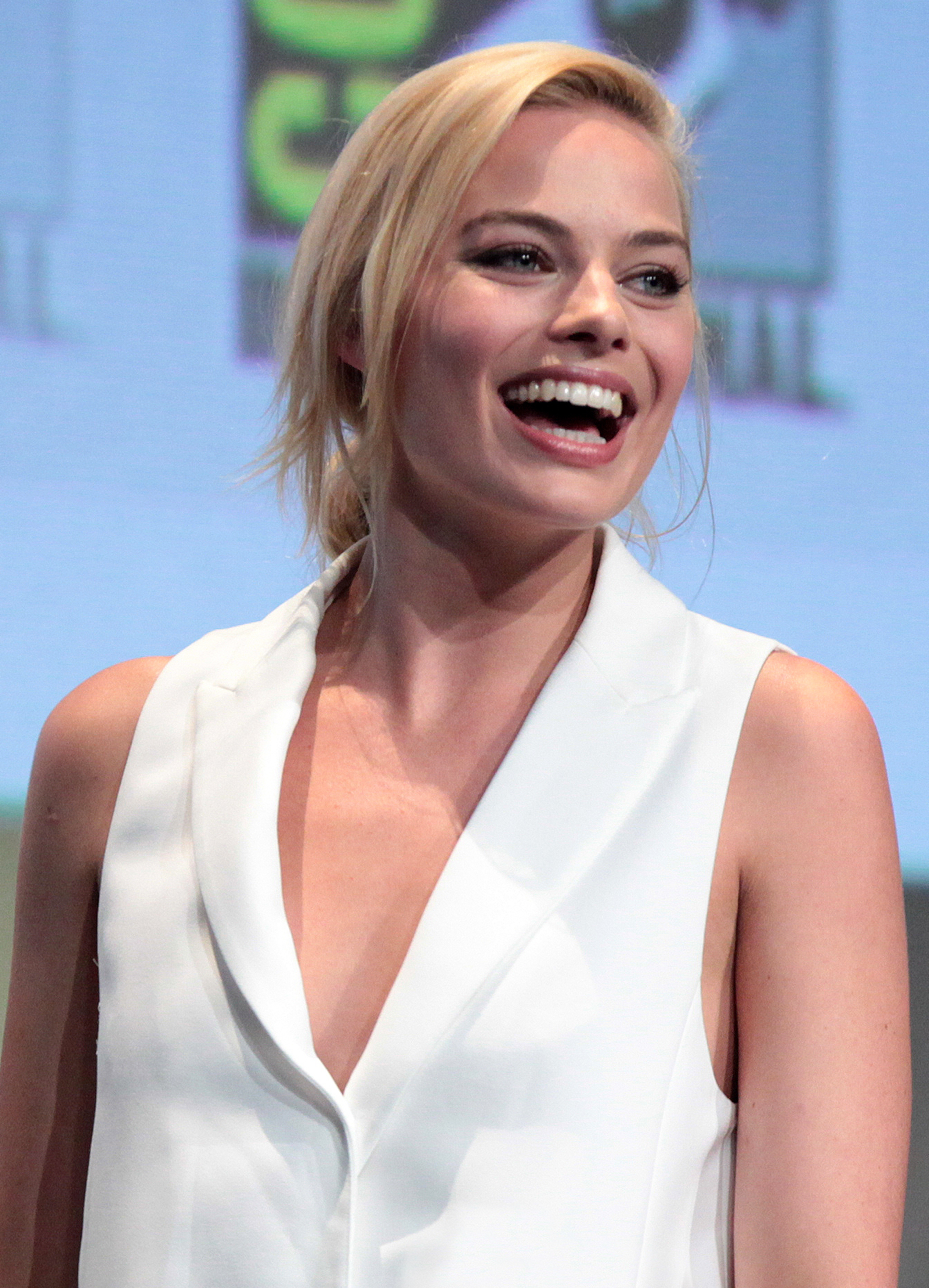
Margot Robbie

Dr. Harleen Quinzel (portrayed by Margot Robbie) first appears in Suicide Squad as an up-and-coming psychiatrist who works with the Joker, falling madly in love with him and being swayed to insanity and a life of crime by the "Clown Prince" of crime. Picking up the moniker Harley Quinn, she and Joker terrorize Gotham City until she is apprehended by Batman. She is later recruited by Amanda Waller along with Deadshot and other criminals into Task Force X, also known as the Suicide Squad, before Joker breaks her out. Birds of Prey explores Harley's misadventures and personal development after she breaks up with Joker, while The Suicide Squad (2021) sees her re-incarcerated and sent on another mission with a later roster of the Suicide Squad.

Harley's character arc in the films sees her go from being defined by her abusive relationship with Joker to becoming more independent and willing to help society, despite her malevolent tendencies and chaotic, unpredictable personality. Robbie stated that it took three hours to prepare her hair, makeup and costume for the role and "at least 45 minutes" to take it off.

=== Floyd Lawton / Deadshot ===
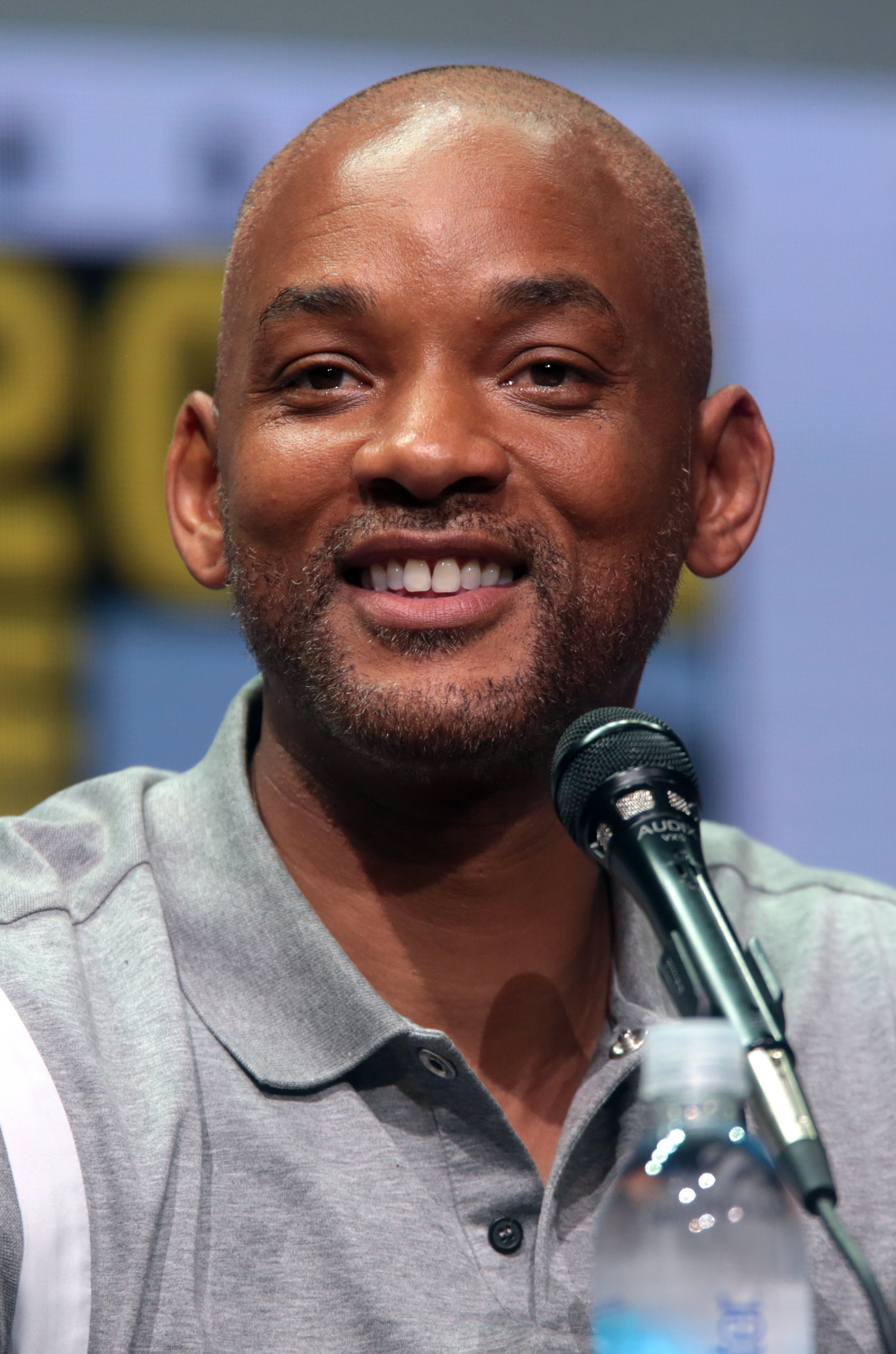
Will Smith

Floyd Lawton (portrayed by Will Smith) is introduced as the main protagonist of Suicide Squad as the "most wanted hitman in the world", Deadshot. Trained to kill with precision using a wide variety of weapons, including even a potato cannon, Deadshot maintains a professional persona as long as he is paid, holding a moral code to never kill women or children, and has a tough, sarcastic personality. However, he is also torn between his career as a mercenary and his compassion for others, also having a strained relationship with his ex-wife and the mother of his daughter, Zoe. Lawton is apprehended by Batman while shopping with Zoe, and is blackmailed by Amanda Waller into joining the Suicide Squad during his incarceration. He strikes up a friendship with fellow squad members Harley Quinn and Chato Santana / El Diablo, and despite the squad not getting along at first, its members appear to have a high respect for Deadshot, something that even Rick Flag points out. After Deadshot helps take down Enchantress, Waller rewards Lawton with ten years taken off his sentence and visitation hours with his daughter.

The DCEU version of Deadshot is African-American as opposed to Caucasian in the comics. In addition, David Ayer's original version of Suicide Squad had him become romantically involved with Harley Quinn. Smith signed on to reprise the role in a multi-film deal, but did not appear in the sequel film The Suicide Squad due to scheduling conflicts, with Idris Elba's Bloodsport being given a prominent role in that film in Smith's absence, though the window remains open for Deadshot to return in the future.

=== Robert DuBois / Bloodsport ===
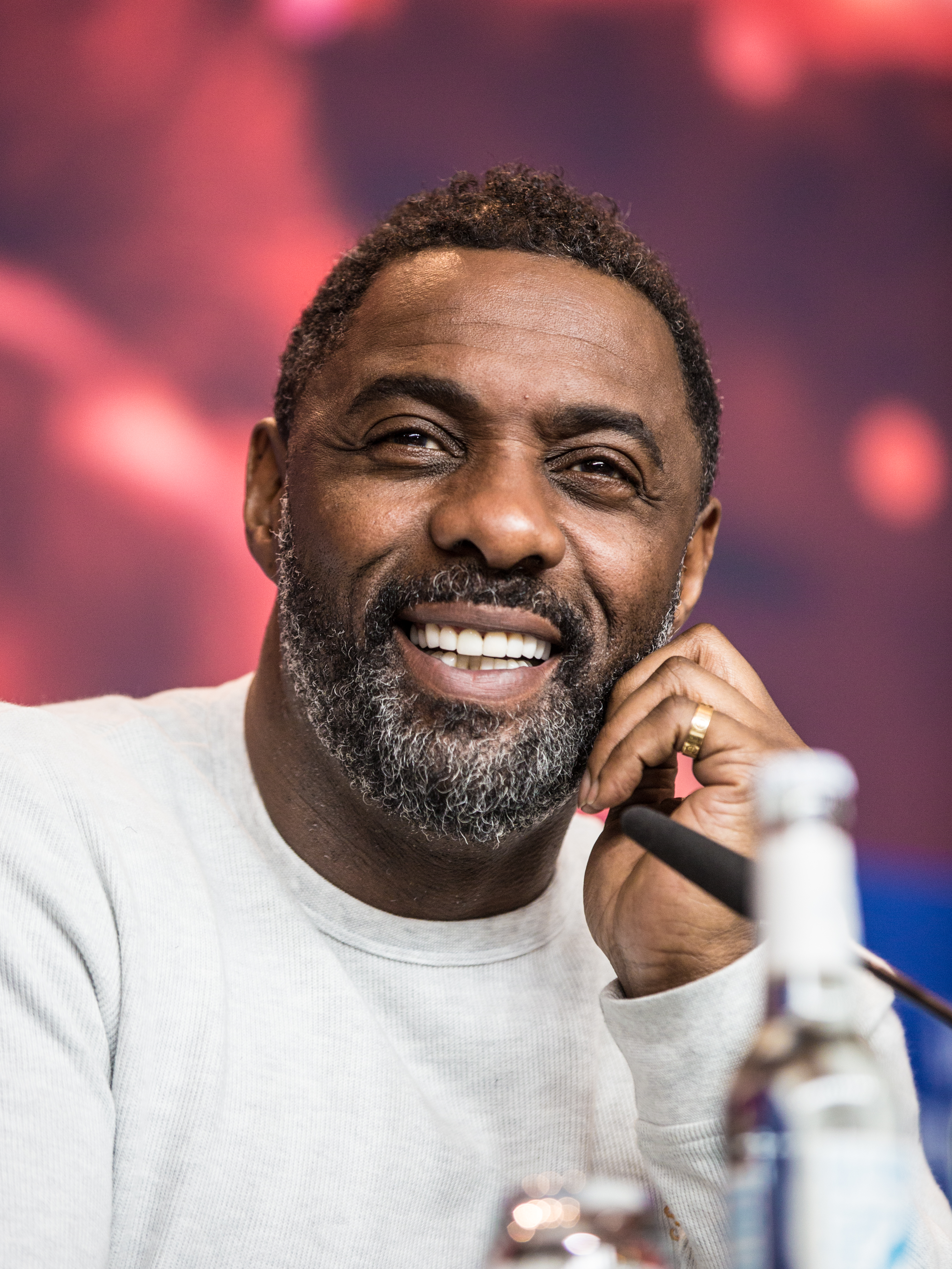
Idris Elba

Robert DuBois (portrayed by Idris Elba), codenamed Bloodsport, is a mercenary with a biometric set of weaponry and armor. After being convicted of shooting and hospitalizing Superman with a kryptonite bullet, DuBois is coerced by Amanda Waller into joining the Suicide Squad, and is sent with Peacemaker, King Shark, Ratcatcher 2 and her pet rat Sebastian, and Polka-Dot Man to destroy the starfish-like alien Starro in Jötunheim, a Nazi-era research facility, having to do with Project Starfish on the island nation of Corto Maltese, which was taken over by an anti-American coup and could use the alien as a weapon against other countries. DuBois and his teammates successfully infiltrate the island, connect with pro-democracy insurgents planning to retake the island, and rescue Rick Flag and Harley Quinn, which unknown to the team, were sent to the island with an earlier squad, which was merely a deliberate decoy by Waller to let the other team infiltrate the island unnoticed.

As characterized in The Suicide Squad, this iteration of Bloodsport is a Black British mercenary, has a daughter named Tyla and often butts heads with Peacemaker while developing an emotional bond with Cleo, despite his fear of rats. He has a battle-hardened, no-nonsense attitude but is compassionate for those he cares for. After learning that American astronauts captured Starro and discovering the inhumane experiments of Project Starfish, DuBois saves Cleo from Peacemaker, who was secretly charged by Waller to make sure that no evidence on the project is leaving the building, as he kills Flag and attempts to kill her for attempting to leak a U.S. government secret related to the project, revealing that the squad was not only send to destroy it, but also to bury its U.S. connections. He takes leadership of the remaining squad members after Flag's death and after Starro escapes following the facility's accidental destruction by the team, Bloodsport defies Waller's orders to leave the island, inspiring the other squad members to defeat Starro and save the island from total destruction. Following the team's victory, he blackmails Waller into setting them free, airlifted off the island and still drop his daughter's trial, which Waller had threatened by incarcerated her if DuBois had refused to join the team, threatening to release the government secrets. After Waller accepted the deal, in honor of their late common friend Flag, Harley proposes to him to become friends with each other.

Going off the theme of the film's main characters representing different eras in film, director James Gunn described Bloodsport as an unsentimental portrayal of a 1960s action hero like Steve McQueen, without the "moral repercussions" of those characters. Elba was reportedly originally cast to replace Will Smith as Deadshot, but the character was changed to Bloodsport to allow Smith to reprise his role in the future; Gunn did not change the story that he had written for Elba, and just chose Bloodsport because he liked the character in the comics. The character's comic book ability to manifest weapons is adapted in the film as different gadgets and transforming weaponry that come from his costume. Bloodsport's ability to send Superman to the ICU was referenced from the character's first comics appearance in 1987, arguably making him more formidable in the films' universe.

=== Christopher Smith / Peacemaker ===
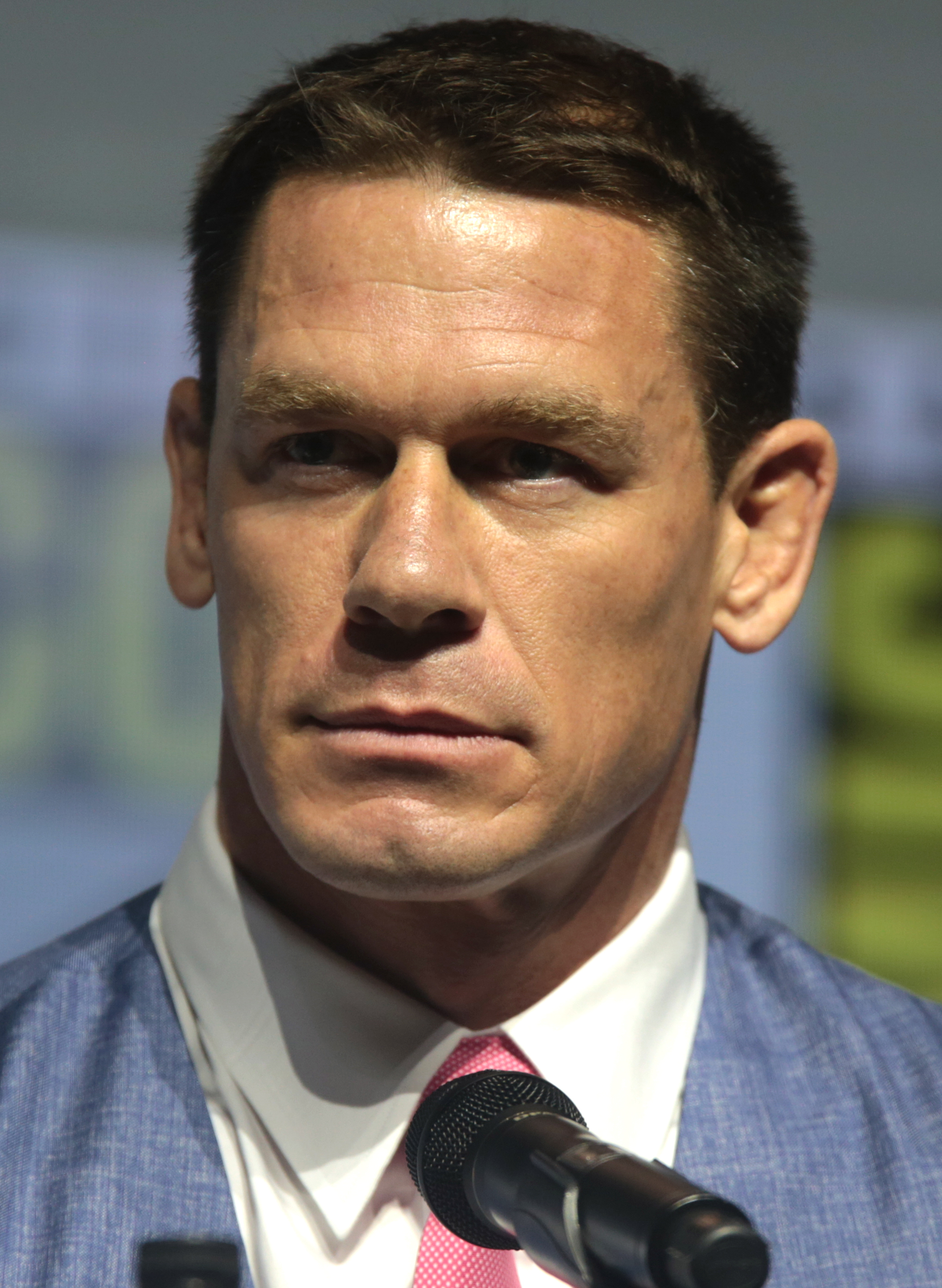
John Cena

Christopher Smith (portrayed by John Cena), also known as Peacemaker, is a ruthless, jingoistic mercenary recruited into a later roster for the Suicide Squad. Described by The Suicide Squad director James Gunn as the "biggest douchebag in the universe," Smith claims in the film that he loves peace so much, that "[he doesn't] care how many men, women, and children [he has to] kill to get it".

Alongside the other members of Suicide Squad, he sets out to take out the Corto Maltesean Nazi-era research facility, Jötenheim, housing Project Starfish, and despite butting heads with Bloodsport and Rick Flag, helps the team get to Jötenheim. After Flag and Ratcatcher 2 discover the U.S. government's involvement with Project Starfish, Peacemaker reveals his secret orders to ensure those details stay confidential to prevent an international incident. He reluctantly kills Flag after a struggle for refusing to destroy a hard drive with the evidence, and later attempts to kill Ratcatcher 2 when she also refuses to hand over the drive, but is thwarted by Bloodsport, who shoots him in the neck. Peacemaker is later revealed to have survived and watched over by Amanda Waller's subordinates for Project Butterfly as he recovers in a comatose state.

Cena reprises the role in the 2022 series Peacemaker as member of Clemson Murn's team of A.R.G.U.S. agents to prevent an invasion by parasitic Butterfly aliens, exploring Peacemaker's relationship with his white supremacist father and how Flag's death affected him. Cena was told by Gunn not to read any comics on the character and to act like a "bro-y, douchey Captain America." John Cena will continue portraying Christopher Smith/Peacemaker in the DCU.

=== Teth-Adam / Black Adam ===
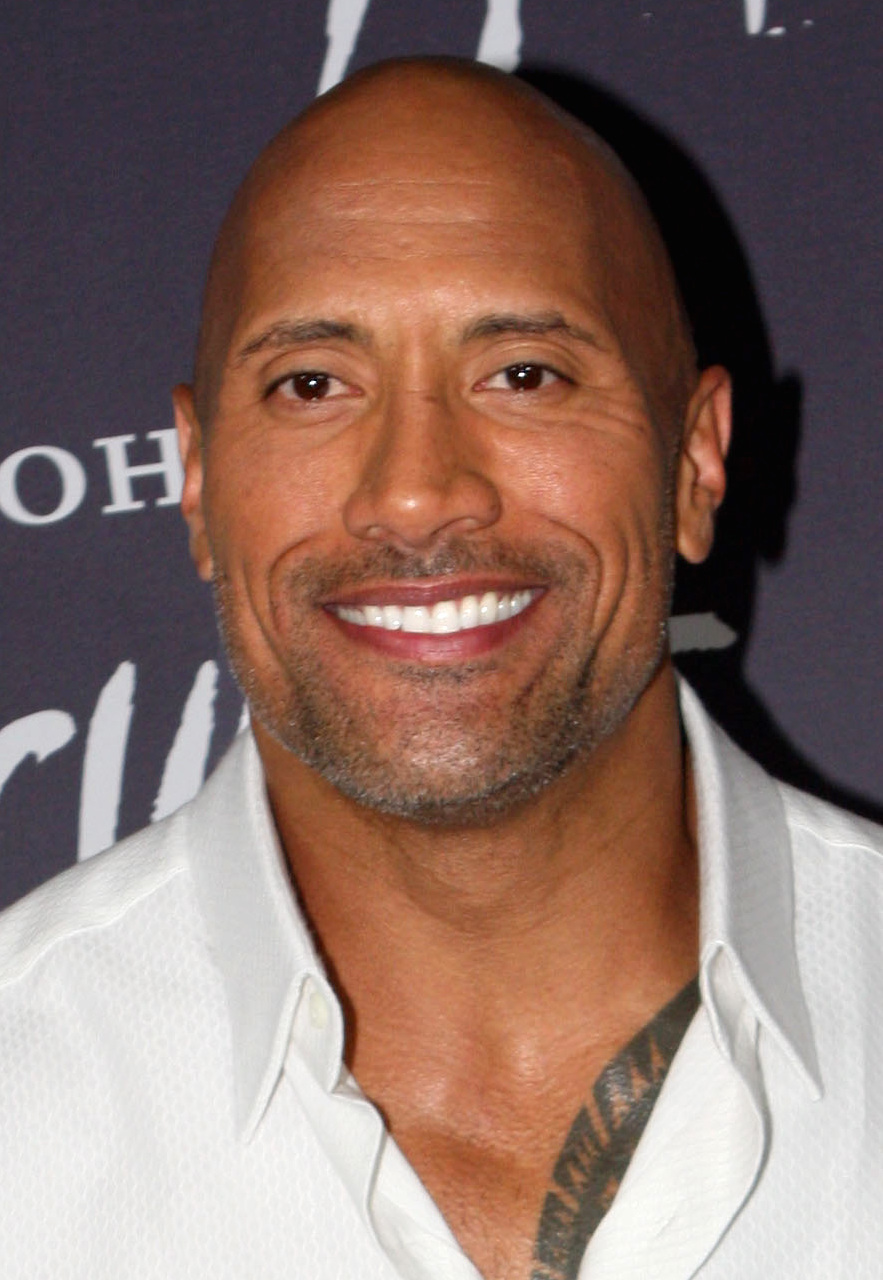
Dwayne Johnson

Teth-Adam (portrayed by Dwayne Johnson) is a former slave originally from ancient Kahndaq 5,000 years in the past. After living under a tyrannical king who oppressed all the inhabitants of the country, Adam becomes endowed with the powers of the Council of Wizards as his son Hurut, who was directly given those powers by the council, transfers them to him to save his life, at the cost of his own. Adam becomes consumed with rage at his son's death, using his powers to avenge Hurut and destroy the king and his men by any means possible, but due to his uncontrollable anger and the resulting mass destruction, Adam is imprisoned for millennia by the council until he is set free in the present day. Seeing Kahndaq under oppression again by foreign interests, he resolves to free his nation by any means necessary, adopting the more modern moniker Black Adam, but also coming to odds with Amanda Waller, A.R.G.U.S., and the Justice Society, who are aware of his past rampage.

The character first appeared in Shazam! as a holographic image, with Johnson's facial likeness used, before making his on-screen debut in Black Adam. Johnson had stated his intentions for Black Adam to fight Shazam, Superman, and other Justice League members in future DCEU films.

=== Jaime Reyes / Blue Beetle ===
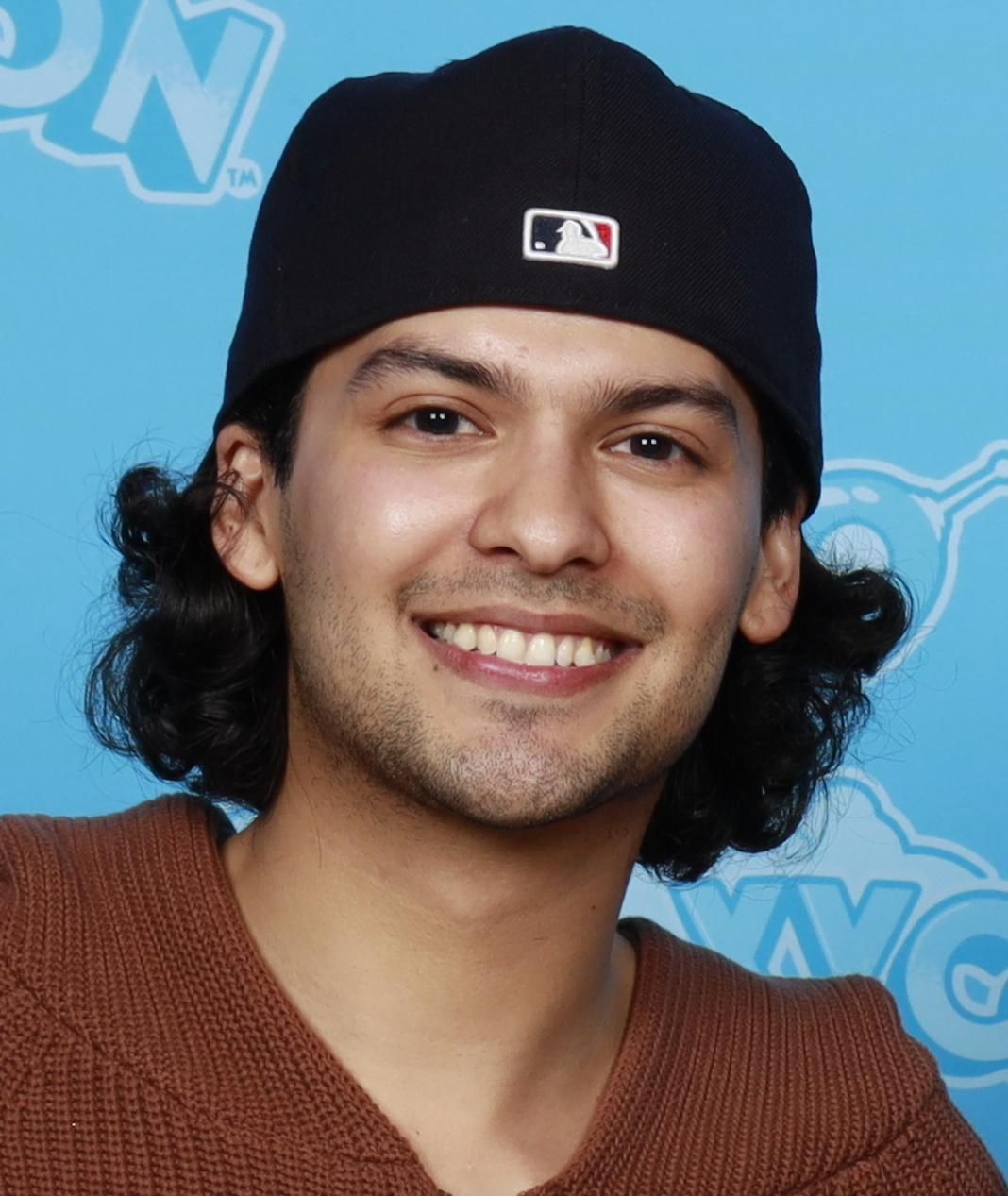
Xolo Maridueña

Jaime Reyes (portrayed by Xolo Maridueña) is a college graduate from Palmera City who tried to help pay off his family's debts by working at Kord Industries, but accidentally bonded with biotechnological alien Khaji-Da. In an attempt to get rid of the beetle, Reyes teamed up with Jenny Kord and his uncle Rudy Reyes to do so, being chased by Victoria Kord and coming into conflict with Conrad Carapax. After the death of his father Alberto Reyes and his capture on Pago Island, Reyes regained his trust, accepting Khaji-Da and fighting Kord Industries to save his family. Accepting to be a superhero, Reyes became Blue Beetle, following the legacy of Ted Kord. Xolo Mariduena will continue portraying Jamie Reyes in the DCU.

== Antagonists ==
=== Ares ===
Ares (portrayed by David Thewlis) is the Olympian God of War and the last surviving member of the Old Gods by the events of Wonder Woman. Despite originally aiding the forces of Earth against the first invasion from Apokolips as seen in both versions of Justice League, Ares turns on his fellow gods and goddesses as he comes to resent humanity, causing mankind to wage war among itself and killing his brothers and sisters until Zeus drives him off Mount Olympus and uses the last of his life force to hide the Amazons on Themyscira and create the "Godkiller". After hiding for millennia and continuing to corrupt mankind upon regaining his strength, Ares resurfaces using the guise of British politician Sir Patrick Morgan and gives off a welcoming, pacifistic demeanor as part of the British Imperial War Cabinet while secretly manipulating the Central Powers, leading to World War I.

As Sir Patrick, Ares provides some secret aid to Diana and Steve Trevor's team as they venture to the front lines of the war in an attempt to destroy the gas being concocted by General Ludendorff and Dr. Maru, despite the War Cabinet vehemently disapproving. After Diana kills Ludendorff, whom she mistakenly believes is Ares, Morgan reveals himself and attempts to sway her to help him in destroying humanity, also revealing her true parentage as her paternal half-brother and her nature as the "Godkiller" (as only a god could kill another god). Diana fights off the temptation, seeing the good in mankind, and overpowers Ares after Steve's death, killing the God of War by redirecting his lightning at him with her Bracelets of Submission.

In Justice League and its director's cut, stuntman Nick McKinless physically played the role, with Thewlis's face digitally superimposed over his.

=== Ignacio Caparax / OMAC ===
Ignacio Carapax (portrayed by Raoul Trujillo), is a troubled Guatemalan lieutenant who, after suffering injuries in battle, began working with Victoria Kord, becoming a powerful soldier with armor and cybernetic enhancements, after being experimented on by Kord Industries. Serving as Victoria's right-hand, he helped her to find biotechnological alien Khaji-Da, coming into conflict with Jaime Reyes to get the relic, gaining new powers until Reyes spared his life, causing Carapax to redeem himself, sacrificing himself to kill Kord.

=== Darkseid ===
Darkseid (portrayed by Ray Porter), originally known as Uxas, is a New God who is the tyrannical ruler of Apokolips and the master of Steppenwolf and DeSaad. While he is merely mentioned in the theatrical version of Justice League, the character makes his first on-screen appearance in the director's cut, with his scenes being restored. The "Snyder Cut" portrays Darkseid, then named Uxas, leading the invasion of Earth prior to his rise to power. As Uxas prepares to use the Anti-Life Equation and the three Mother Boxes to conquer the Earth, a coalition of warriors, which includes mankind, Atlanteans, Amazons, Old Gods, and a Green Lantern, counterattack, forcing his retreat after grievously injuring him and separating the boxes. While he recovers and takes over the throne of Apokolips over the course of millennia, the location of the equation is lost and the Mother Boxes are hidden by the Amazons, Atlanteans, and humans.

After Steppenwolf is alerted to the presence of the boxes and equation on Earth, he informs Darkseid, who entices his disgraced uncle and lieutenant to seize both so he can use the equation to take over the multiverse. Darkseid opens a portal to Earth when the Mother Boxes are nearly synchronized, only to see Barry Allen undo the Unity by entering the Speed Force. This allows the Justice League to separate the boxes and kill Steppenwolf, throwing his body back through the portal to Darkseid's feet. An enraged Darkseid then tells Desaad to "ready the armada" and use the "old ways" to reclaim the Anti-Life Equation, with the Mother Boxes no longer able to be used to conquer planets.

Porter played Darkseid through the use of motion capture and "went through a few different vocal gymnastics trying to figure out the voice". Porter was unfamiliar with the Darkseid character upon being cast, but Zack Snyder and screenwriter Chris Terrio helped guide him with their knowledge of the comic book lore.

=== Eek Stack Ik Ik / Goff ===
Eek Stack Ik Ik (portrayed by Antonio Cupo while possessing Royland Goff and by Annie Chang while possessing Sophie Song), also known as Goff, is the Queen of the alien specie known as Butterflies, alien bug-like creatures that escaped from their home planet as it was dying, moving to the Earth. She possesses Senator Royland Goff to use political power to avoid humans from destroying the Earth and end just like her planet. After escaping Peacemaker and Vigilante's custody, she possesses Detective Sophie Song, also taking control of the entire Evergreen Police Department, to begin his plan for world domination, teleporting a giant creature known as "the Cow", which provides them with the only food the Butterflies can eat. Peacemaker and his group, known as the 11th Street Kids, manage to stop the Butterflies' plan, killing them all, including the Cow and Eek Stack Ik Ik.

=== Ishmael Gregor / Sabbac ===
Ishmael Gregor (portrayed by Marwan Kenzari) is the leader of the Kahndaq faction of Intergang, an international criminal organization. He poses as an associate of archaeologist Adrianna Tomaz, who seeks to find the crown of Sabbac and hide it from malevolent individuals, not knowing that Gregor is after the crown himself as the last descendant of the oppressive King Ahk-Ton, the creator of the crown. Gregor, like his ancestor, seeks the crown so he can harness its power and become the all-powerful ruler of Kahndaq. He kidnaps Adrianna's son Amon to coerce her into giving him the crown and get Teth-Adam's attention, manipulating Adam into killing him so he can be reborn with the crown's power as Sabbac. Kent Nelson / Doctor Fate realizes he and the Justice Society were wrong about Adam after seeing Sabbac's rampage, so Fate releases the apprehended Adam so he can defeat and kill Sabbac, which he does by ripping Sabbac in half, restoring order to Kahndaq and potentially the world.

=== Hespera ===
Hespera (portrayed by Helen Mirren) is the eldest daughter of Atlas and the sister of Kalypso and Anthea. Millennia after Atlas' death, Hespera and her sisters sought to recover their father's stamina from the Shazam Family and restore their home realm using the Golden Apple from Hera's sacred tree, while Kalypso also intended to unterraform Earth with Shazam's Staff of the Gods. When Hespera and Anthea objected, Kalypso mortally wounded Hespera before planting the Apple and attacking Philadelphia with her army of mythical creatures, but Hespera helped Billy defeat her in her last moments before dying.

=== Joker ===
The Joker (portrayed by Jared Leto) is the archenemy of Batman, the ex-boyfriend of Harley Quinn, and a ruthless crime lord in Gotham City. Batman v Superman: Dawn of Justice alludes to Joker murdering Batman's protégé Robin prior to the film's events. Joker first meets Harley, then a budding psychiatrist named Dr. Harleen Quinzel, while imprisoned during a flashback seen in Suicide Squad. She falls madly in love with him and goes great lengths to be with him after he escapes prison, and the two begin to terrorize Gotham City as its most notorious criminals. After Harley herself is imprisoned and pressganged into the Suicide Squad, Joker aims to free her from her predicament, not liking that something of his was taken from him. Later, however, he breaks up with her prior to the events of Birds of Prey, because she wanted credit for her ideas for their successful crimes, and can be seen in Batman's premonitions of a potential future world ruled by Darkseid in Zack Snyder's Justice League.

This iteration of the Joker was met with polarized reviews, especially in the theatrically released version of Suicide Squad. However, director David Ayer and Leto both revealed that the studio cut out much of the Joker's footage in the film, which arguably cut down his characterization in the theatrical release.

=== David Kane / Black Manta ===
David Kane (portrayed by Yahya Abdul-Mateen II) is a pirate and mercenary working alongside his father, Jesse. The two lead a strike force contracted by King Orm to hijack a Russian Akula-class submarine, which is foiled by Aquaman sometime after the Justice League defeats Steppenwolf. Arthur dispatches the pirates and inadvertently traps Jesse in the submarine when the Kanes attempt to kill him, leaving Jesse to drown despite his son's pleas. A vengeful Kane escapes the submarine and is later given advanced Atlantean armor and command of a strike force of Atlantean soldiers by King Orm after Arthur and Mera escape Atlantis. Kane rechristens himself Black Manta after modifying the armor and attacks Arthur and Mera with his strike force in Sicily, though the two fend off the attack. After heated one-on-one combat, Arthur damages Manta's armor and sends him careening off a cliff into the sea. Manta is later found and rescued by Stephen Shin, and makes a deal with Shin to tell him more about Atlantis in exchange for helping him track down Aquaman.

In the DCEU's continuity, the title "Black Manta" was first conferred on Kane's grandfather as a nickname when he was working as a frogman for the U.S. Navy during World War II; Kane's grandfather turns to piracy when he was not recognized for his accomplishments due to his African-American heritage and passes his illicit trade to his son and grandson. Mateen reprised his role as Black Manta in Aquaman and the Lost Kingdom.

=== Kalypso ===
Kalypso (portrayed by Lucy Liu), is the second daughter of Atlas and the sister of Hespera and Anthea. Millennia after Atlas' death, Kalypso and her sisters sought to recover their father's stamina from the Shazam Family and restore their home realm using the Golden Apple from Hera's sacred tree, while Kalypso also intended to unterraform Earth with Shazam's Magic staff. When Hespera and Anthea objected, Kalypso mortally wounded Hespera and depowered Anthea before planting the Apple and attacking Philadelphia with her army of mythical creatures until her demise by Billy Batson.

=== Victoria Kord ===
Victoria Kord (portrayed by Susan Sarandon) is a nefarious businesswoman who is the CEO of Kord Industries, the sister of Ted Kord, and the aunt of Jenny Kord. Jealous for not getting the position of her father's company, Victoria was filled with anger and revenge against her brother, finding Khaji-Da Scarab to create cybernetic soldiers called OMAC, starting with Ignacio Carapax, which brought him into conflict with Jenny Kord and Khaji-Da's host Jaime Reyes, but despite their efforts, Victoria failed in her plans, being betrayed/killed by Carapax. Following Victoria's death, Jenny is sworn in as the new CEO of Kord Industries.

=== Maxwell "Max Lord" Lorenzano ===
Max Lord (portrayed by Pedro Pascal) is a struggling yet charismatic oil businessman and television personality. He is the owner of Black Gold Oil located in Washington, D.C., and hopes to gain possession of an ancient powerful relic which has the power to grant wishes known as the "Dreamstone". He also has a young son named Alistair Lord.

Born "Maxwell Lorenzano", Max Lord grew up in a poor household with his violent father, Alberto Lorenzano. Induced by Alberto's aggressive behavior he develops as an anxious child and prone to bed-wetting. At school, Max was frequently the subject of taunts and bullying for his comparative poverty to the other students who made fun of his tatty clothes, worn-out shoes, and small amount of food for lunch.

Due to a lack of money, he was not able to attend college after finishing school. These experiences imbued Max with a deep motivation to achieve financial success in life. He started his own business, Black Gold Cooperative, initially as a one-man operation and changed his surname name from "Lorenzano" to "Lord". Gradually, Max convinced financiers, most prominently Simon Stagg, to invest in his company, which tasked itself with oil exploration in areas that other companies had ignored.

Max finally attains control of the Dreamstone after deceiving Barbara Miverva, wishing to "become the stone". As a result, he gains the stone's powers and starts granting wishes to people around the globe, but starts to physically deteriorate. Wonder Woman later confronts him, showing the pain he inflicts on his son by being distant from him, and convinces him to renounce his wish, after which he reconciles with Alistair.

Critics have compared Pascal's interpretation of Max Lord in Wonder Woman 1984 to Donald Trump during the 1980s. However, Gal Gadot, who co-produced the film, stated that any similarities to Trump were coincidental. Conversely, director Patty Jenkins commented that Lord's character is modeled on Bernie Madoff and Trump.

=== General Erich Ludendorff ===
A highly fictionalized version of the real-life German general who fought in World War I, Erich Ludendorff (portrayed by Danny Huston) is a pragmatic, iron-fisted tactician who leads the Imperial German Army during the waning days of the war, enlisting Dr. Maru to create a deadlier, hydrogen-based variant of mustard gas in an attempt to turn the tide of battle. Ludendorff is portrayed as ruthless and unforgiving, willing to kill combatants and civilians on both sides of the war to achieve his goals, including fellow German generals negotiating to surrender. Diana believes he is Ares at first after hearing Steve Trevor's account of the war. She attempts to assassinate him at a gala he hosts until Steve stops her to avoid blowing their cover. When Ludendorff deploys his mustard gas on an innocent village during a demonstration at the gala, Diana confronts him again as he prepares to attack London with a larger dose, getting her vengeance on him. However, the war does not end when Diana kills him, leaving her confused and disillusioned until Sir Patrick Morgan reveals himself as the God of War.

Huston described his version of Ludendorff as a "pragmatist, realist, patriotic, fighting for his country", further explaining, "he lost his son on the German front lines and was just quite tortured, diabolical, stubborn and believes that what he's doing is for the betterment of mankind." On his character, Huston said "Ludendorff is a believer that war is a natural habitat for humans" and also states that "somebody like Ludendorff would probably think that the idea that love conquers all is quite a naive concept.

=== Lex Luthor ===
Alexander "Lex" Luthor Jr. (portrayed by Jesse Eisenberg) is the multi-billionaire CEO of LexCorp. While he displays a welcoming but frantic "tech bro" persona in public, he is in actuality a scheming, diabolical figure who despises Superman and is obsessed with killing him. Luthor manipulates several events in Batman v Superman, including the scuffle in Nairomi and the eventual bombing of the U.S. Capitol, to tarnish Superman's public image. He also finds methods to pit Superman and Batman against each other, taking advantage of Batman's rage and subsequent questionable acts to get Superman enraged at the former, and manipulates members of the U.S. Senate to get access to the Kryptonian scout ship left over from the battle of Metropolis. He eventually entices Superman and Batman to fight each other to the death after kidnapping Martha Kent, but Superman and Lois Lane convince Batman to join forces with them against Luthor before Batman is able to kill Superman. With this plan foiled, Luthor unleashes a Kryptonian deformity that he had created from Zod's body and the scout ship, resulting in Superman giving his own life to kill it. Luthor is then arrested and sent to Arkham Asylum, but gloats at Superman's death, which results in the forces of Apokolips arriving to Earth. He later manages to escape from Arkham and contacts Deathstroke at the end of Justice League and its director's cut.

This iteration of Lex Luthor is noticeably different than in the comics, as well as Gene Hackman's portrayal of the character in the 1978–87 Superman film series. He is also characterized as a misotheist, hating God and other god-like beings such as Superman as he perceives the gods failed to protect him from abuse received from his father. Eisenberg made an effort to differentiate his take on the character from that of Hackman and Kevin Spacey, and also states that his character views Superman as a genuine threat to humanity rather than simply someone to destroy. Some critics have drawn similarities between Eisenberg's performance as Luthor and his portrayal of Facebook founder Mark Zuckerberg in The Social Network.

=== Orm Marius ===
King Orm Marius (portrayed by Patrick Wilson) is the second son of Queen Atlanna and maternal half-brother of Arthur Curry. Orm seeks to become the Ocean Master by uniting the Seven Kingdoms of the Atlanteans and despises the surface world for polluting the seas, aiming to eradicate humanity in revenge. He also hates Arthur for his mixed heritage and illegitimate birth, blaming him for their mother's banishment, and like General Zod, has a dogmatic and idealized view of his people while being mostly ruthless to those he perceives as enemies. Having taken the throne of Atlantis by the events of Zack Snyder's Justice League and Aquaman, Orm is described as stubborn by Nuidis Vulko and Mera, opting to devote all resources to wage war with the surface world instead of guarding the Atlantean Mother Box, indirectly leading to its seizure by Steppenwolf.

After Orm hires Jesse and David Kane to hijack a submarine and stage a fake attack on Atlantis, Arthur foils the attack and sinks the submarine. Orm later confronts Arthur when he sneaks into Atlantis with Mera and Vulko, offering him the chance to leave forever, but Arthur engages in a duel with him. Orm nearly kills Arthur until Mera intervenes and narrowly escapes with the latter. Following this, he gives David the Black Manta equipment to hunt down Arthur and convinces four kingdoms to join his regime through brute force and deception, but is ultimately defeated and dethroned by Arthur when he finds Atlan's Trident. Arthur spares Orm despite the latter enticing his brother to finish him off, but once Atlanna emerges alive, Orm accepts his punishment and is arrested, beginning to consider reconciling with Arthur.

Orm reappears in the sequel Aquaman and the Lost Kingdom, and is revealed to be imprisoned in the Sahara desert by the Deserter tribe due to him murdering the Fisherman King. He was rescued by Arthur from his prison and he begrudgingly agreed to unite with Arthur to save Atlantis and defeat Black Manta. Both brothers are able to track down Black Manta, but due to Black Manta being possessed by the Black Trident, they are defeated and Orm, who was temporarily possessed by the trident's evil power, discovers the forgotten existence of Necrus, a seventh underwater kingdom that is ruled by the trident's original owner, Atlan's evil brother Kordax, and that both Kordax and the kingdom are sealed by a blood curse cast by Atlan to prevent the evil power from being discovered. Subsequently, Arthur, Orm and their allies manage to track down Necrus and Black Manta, arriving in time to save Arthur's son. Orm becomes possessed by the spirit of Kordax when he grabs the Black Trident. This possession lets Kordax use Orm to help free himself. While under Kordax's influence, Orm attacks Arthur and uses Arthur's blood to break the magical seal imprisoning Kordax. But Arthur appeals to their brotherhood, reminding Orm of their connection and shared past; Orm then resists and relinquishes the trident's hold. After Kordax is destroyed and the immediate threat is over, Arthur chooses not to send Orm back to prison. Instead, he allows Orm to fake his death (so that Atlantis believes he died) so Orm can live freely and make a fresh start. In the final scenes of the movie, Orm is shown enjoying a cheeseburger in a restaurant, and even picks up a cockroach to eat it with the burger (partly due to Arthur previously tricking Orm into thinking cockroaches are food).

Wilson previously portrayed Dan Dreiberg/Nite Owl II in the 2009 film Watchmen and voiced the President of the United States in Batman v Superman: Dawn of Justice, making Aquaman his third DC Comics film appearance. Orm's role in the sequel Aquaman and the Lost Kingdom was portrayed as a more sympathetic and redemptive character, as DC Films president Walter Hamada described the film as a "buddy comedy" between Arthur and Orm.

=== Dr. Isabel Maru / Dr. Poison ===
Dr. Isabel Maru (portrayed by Elena Anaya) is a Spanish chemist enlisted by General Ludendorff to create a deadlier, hydrogen-based variant of mustard gas, also managing to create strength-boosting elixirs for him. Maru's vicious nature earns her the nickname Doctor Poison by the Allied forces and Ludendorff's "witch" by the Germans. She wears a ceramic mask that hides her disfigured cheek. While infiltrating the Central Powers, Steve Trevor sees first-hand the lethality of Maru's experiments and steals a notebook with her formulas, smuggling it to the British War Council after fleeing and encountering Diana and the Amazons. Steve later tries to seduce Maru at Ludendorff's gala to get more of her secrets, but his attempt is foiled when Maru sees him notice Diana also infiltrating the event. Ares later tempts Diana to kill Maru after the German base is destroyed, but Diana spares her and allows her to flee out of mercy, instead focusing on defeating Ares.

The Isabel Maru incarnation of Doctor Poison is also the character's first live-action appearance, though the Wonder Woman film places Doctor Poison and other Wonder Woman characters as originating in World War I as opposed to World War II.

=== Barbara Minerva / Cheetah ===
Barbara Ann Minerva (portrayed by Kristen Wiig) is Diana Prince's co-worker at the Smithsonian Institution, growing envious of Diana and constantly being belittled by her boss. Diana and Barbara help the FBI find the Dreamstone, and Barbara wishes to become like Diana, and later further wishing to be an "Apex Predator", inadvertently gaining cheetah-like body-and-superpowers. She uses her newfound powers to fight Wonder Woman and collude with Max Lord, but Wonder Woman later defeats her after restoring her powers to full strength and finding Asteria's Golden Eagle armour.

=== June Moone / Enchantress and Incubus ===
The Enchantress is a witch that possesses archeologist June Moone (portrayed by Cara Delevingne) when Moone encounters a totem pole containing the witch. The witch only possesses June when she speaks the name. Amanda Waller selects her for the Task Force X program, but she ends up going rogue upon secretly stealing her heart from Waller and frees her brother, Incubus (portrayed by Alain Chanoine), who then possesses an unnamed man. With him, Enchantress attempts to use her magic to build a superweapon to conquer the world, but Task Force X is assembled to defeat her. During the confrontation, the Enchantress tries to sway over Task Force X by granting them what they most desire. While Harley Quinn wants to reunite with the Joker following his apparent death, El Diablo sees through the illusion and breaks free, sacrificing himself to destroy Incubus. With a bomb placed there by Killer Croc, the machine she intended to use to enslave the Earth is destroyed. Rick Flag then crushes the Enchantress' heart, killing her and freeing June, with whom he had a relationship.

Suicide Squad director David Ayer revealed that Enchantress was originally the supporting villain in the film and was under the control of Steppenwolf via a Mother Box, but that this plot element was removed during pre-production. Steppenwolf was then replaced by Incubus as the secondary villain with Enchantress being made the primary antagonist. Ayer also revealed that his director's cut of the film, which has yet to be released, shows more of June Moone's relationship with Rick Flag, in addition to Enchantress seizing control over Katana and turning her against the squad.

=== Roman Sionis / Black Mask ===
Roman Sionis / Black Mask (portrayed by Ewan McGregor) is a ruthless and wealthy Gotham City crime lord who owns the "Black Mask Club". Sionis rules over Gotham's criminal empire with an iron fist. He becomes an enemy of Harley Quinn, Cassandra Cain, and the Birds of Prey.

Not much is known about Roman's early life, except that he came from the wealthy Sionis family, whose name is plastered on "about half the schools and hospitals in Gotham." While Roman himself claimed that he wasn't born into privilege and had to work for everything he has, the fact that he was cut off by his family due to excessive spending and poor business sense says that Roman is likely not the most unbiased narrator of his own life. At least 15 years before the events of Birds of Prey, he meets with Victor Zsasz and funds crime boss Stefano Galante's rise to power, which results in the murder of the entire Bertinelli line (sans Helena Bertinelli, who managed to escape). Since then, Roman has been building a criminal empire for himself in Gotham's East End, unifying crime families and keeping those under his sway out of jail.

Said to be an absolute narcissist and a homicidal psychopath, Sionis is also highly ambitious, power-hungry, sadistic, and emotionally unstable. He is also highly misogynistic and seems to see women mainly as objects for his use and amusement. He revels in violence, and can easily lose his temper when things do not go his way. However, he appears to care for both his right-hand man and best friend Victor Zsasz as well as his new driver bodyguard, Dinah Lance, who he appears to have some level of attraction towards. Still, he is ultimately a remorseless and chaotically malevolent psychopath, showing signs of unspeakable depravity.

After a fierce battle between his thugs and the Birds of Prey during his pursuit of the Bertinelli diamond, things came ahead at the Founders Pier, wherein a final confrontation, Black Mask meets his match. As Quinn fights him, Cassandra Cain plants a grenade on his person. Quinn then throws him off the pier as the grenade explodes and kills him, thus ending Roman's Empire and rule over Gotham City.

=== Dr. Thaddeus Sivana ===
Dr. Thaddeus Sivana (portrayed by Mark Strong) is a research scientist working for Sivana Industries, but is often talked down by his family members. Sivana is summmoned as a child by the wizard Shazam who is seeking a successor, but rejected as he is easily tempted by the Seven Deadly Sins. Seeking revenge, Sivana devotes his years researching how to get back to the Rock of Eternity and upon finally doing so, takes the Eye of Sin, freeing the Sins, and incapacitates Shazam. Dr. Sivana becomes empowered with the Sins, killing the Sivana Industries board of directors, including his father and brother, for not allowing him onto the board and constantly demeaning him. He finds Billy Batson, who had been named Shazam's champion, demanding his powers. Billy battles Sivana after he kidnaps his foster siblings and is nearly blackmailed into granting Sivana his powers, but instead shares his powers with his siblings, allowing them to defeat Sivana after separating him from the Sins.

=== Auggie Smith / White Dragon ===
August Ransom "Auggie" Smith / White Dragon (portrayed by Robert Patrick) is the leader of the Aryan Empire, an infamous white supremacist organization, and the abusive father of Christopher Smith / Peacemaker. A notorious supervillain, Auggie owns armor capable of flight and firing energy blasts which he designed himself. Auggie raised both Christopher and his brother Keith to become assassins, as well as forcing them to fight each other during cock fights. During one such fight, Peacemaker inadvertently caused Keith to have a fatal seizure. This incident resulted in Auggie developing a deep hatred for Chris, which was further fueled by his bisexuality and rejection of Auggie's racist ideals. Though Auggie remained deeply emotionally abusive of his son even when he reached adulthood, he still aided him in his vigilantism by providing him with equipment.

After being framed for Chris's murder of Annie Sturphausen by John Economos, Auggie is arrested and imprisoned in a county jail. After Auggie threatens to expose Project Butterfly as revenge, Vigilante is dispatched into the prison to assassinate him. Auggie survives and becomes convinced his son is trying to kill him. Auggie is released by Detective Sophie Song, and immediately amasses his followers and dons his armor to kill Chris. Tracking his son down using a GPS tracking program installed in his helmets, he leads the Aryan Empire to attack Peacemaker, Economos, and Vigilante. However, Economos kills Auggie's followers, while Vigilante severely damages his armor, leaving Auggie helpless. Peacemaker angrily beats Auggie and shoots him in the head when he mocks him once more.

=== Starro ===
Starro the Conqueror is a starfish-like alien creature that grows bigger with every being it gains control of. The alien is discovered by NASA astronauts 30 years prior to the events of The Suicide Squad, then captured and experimented on at Jötunheim. In the present, Amanda Waller sends the Suicide Squad to destroy Jötunheim before Starro can be weaponized by the Luna/Suárez regime and America's role in the experiments are exposed. Starro escapes, thanks to the bombs going off prematurely, then enslaves many of Corto Maltese's citizens, including Suárez, and goes on a rampage. Though Waller orders the squad to leave the island, they decide to fight Starro to protect the island's inhabitants. The now-colossal alien is taken down by a combined effort from Harley, Bloodsport, King Shark, Polka-Dot Man, and Ratcatcher 2, the latter of whom summons the island's rats to chew Starro to death. In his final moments, Starro (through Suárez) laments he never wanted to hurt anyone initially and was content floating in space, only turning vengeful in response to the torture he was put through.

=== Steppenwolf ===
Steppenwolf (portrayed by Ciarán Hinds) is a New God general from the planet Apokolips working under Darkseid. First debuting in the Ultimate Edition of Batman v Superman: Dawn of Justice as Lex Luthor views holograms in the Kryptonian scout ship, Steppenwolf appears in both versions of Justice League as the main antagonist, leading an army of Parademons and seeks to invade the Earth and destroy all life on the planet. In both versions of the latter film, Steppenwolf seeks the three Mother Boxes to carry out the Earth's destruction with the newly formed Justice League proving no match for him and his forces at first, but they are able to defeat him with help from a resurrected Superman.

The character of Steppenwolf originally appeared in 1972 as a New God associated with Darkseid and Apokolips in New Gods #7, and is traditionally a recurring villain against Superman and the Justice League. Prior to his inclusion in the DC Extended Universe, Steppenwolf briefly appeared in several works in the DC Animated Universe such as Superman: The Animated Series and the Justice League animated series, and later in other cartoons such as Batman: The Brave and the Bold and Justice League Action.

Suicide Squad director David Ayer revealed that Enchantress was originally the supporting villain in the film and was under the control of Steppenwolf via a Mother Box, but that this plot element was removed during pre-production, due to rewrites of Justice League, which originally had Darkseid as the main villain. Steppenwolf was then moved over to Justice League and replaced by Enchantress's brother Incubus in Suicide Squad, with Enchantress being made the primary antagonist.

Due to extensive retoolings of the film by Warner Bros., numerous differences exist in Steppenwolf's characterization and arc in the theatrical cut and the director's cut. Steppenwolf's design and motivations in the theatrical cut were simplified, while the director's cut gives him a more imposing and sinister demeanor and appearance, also having him speak less. The theatrical cut has him in place of Darkseid during the first invasion of Earth by the forces of Apokolips, while the director's cut gives further backstory to the character as he had unsuccessfully attempted to betray Darkseid and is now trying to gain his favor back by destroying 150,000 worlds, including finishing the attempted destruction of Earth, and discovers the presence of the Anti-Life Equation. In addition, his demise was changed; the theatrical cut has Steppenwolf give in to fear after Superman and Wonder Woman destroy his axe, retreating while presumably being consumed by his own Parademons, while in the "Snyder Cut", he is overpowered by Superman, stabbed by Aquaman, and beheaded by Wonder Woman, with his head and body rolling to Apokolips via boom tube to land at Darkseid's feet.

Hinds described his character as "old, tired" and trying to find a way to escape his role of servitude under Darkseid. He had sought advice from fellow actor Liam Neeson for the role. Hinds was reportedly unhappy with the final theatrical cut of the film, which trimmed down the backstory and characterization of Steppenwolf. The character's original design was restored in the director's cut of the film.

Irish actor Ciarán Hinds was cast to portray Steppenwolf in Justice League through voice and motion capture. Hinds received advice from Liam Neeson (who had done similar motion capture work in A Monster Calls) for his performance.

Steppenwolf's portrayal in the theatrical release of Justice League wasn't well received by critics, with Screen Rant describing this rendition as "generic", "forgettable", and too "family friendly." His CGI design was also poorly received, which was partially attributed to the redesign of the character being pushed through late in production. Steppenwolf's depiction in the director's cut was much more warmly received by fans and critics, with praise directed at his monstrous and alien design, his more menacing and sinister presence, and his greater level of character depth and development in contrast to his theatrical counterpart. Specifically, Comic Book Resources commented that this latter version of the character was more believable as a credible threat to the protagonists.

Sam Adams of Slate.com compared both versions of the character in an analysis of Zack Snyder's Justice League, noting the different portrayals of Steppenwolf as one of the key differences between the theatrical and director's cuts. Adams called Whedon's version "quippier and creepier", likening the character to "cosplaying Mike Pence" and criticizing his armor, which he likened to a generic medieval garb.

=== Faora-Ul ===
Sub-commander Faora-Ul (portrayed by Antje Traue) is Zod's second-in-command. Like Zod, she is sentenced with him and his followers into the Phantom Zone after their coup is foiled. Faora is portrayed as a highly skilled but sadistic warrior with a disdain for her enemies and overconfidence in her dogmatic beliefs, though she is highly patriotic to her home world of Krypton, expressing great sorrow when she sees its ruins upon being freed from the Phantom Zone.

Faora lands on Earth to take Kal-El as her prisoner when Zod's forces land on Earth, though she also demands Lois Lane accompany them. She and another Kryptonian grunt fight Superman back on the surface when he escapes their ship, with Superman narrowly defeating her when he breaks open her helmet, exposing her to the Earth's atmospherics and temporarily weakening her. Though she expresses no emotion when dispatching several soldiers from the U.S. Army, she gains some respect for Colonel Hardy when he stands up to her, deeming him a worthy opponent. Faora is sent to take down Hardy's transport aircraft when it and other fighter jets attack the Black Zero, ambushing the craft when it nears the mother ship. However, Hardy crashes the plane into the Black Zero as she nears the cockpit, causing an explosion that sends Faora and the rest of Zod's troops back to the Phantom Zone for good.

In preparation for the role of Faora, Traue underwent an intense four-month training and dieting program. Gal Gadot, who would later be cast as Diana Prince / Wonder Woman starting in Batman v Superman, revealed that she had previously been offered the role of Faora, but turned it down due to pregnancy.

=== Dru-Zod ===
General Dru-Zod (portrayed by Michael Shannon) is the supreme military commander of Krypton who attempts a coup and is imprisoned along with his forces in the Phantom Zone prior to the planet's destruction. He and Jor-El both agree that their world is doomed, but have different methodologies in trying to save their race, leading to their fall-out. After the planet's destruction, Zod and his followers are released from their imprisonment but left to float among the remains of Krypton until they repurpose their prison ship, the Black Zero.

When Jor-El's son Kal-El, now going by the name Clark Kent and later dubbed "Superman", activates a scout ship on Earth, Zod's forces detect a distress signal sent by the ship and demand that Earth's citizens hand Kal over. After Clark discovers that Zod intends to xenoform the Earth into a new Krypton, killing all its inhabitants in the process, Clark sides with the people of Earth and helps the U.S. military take down Zod's forces, sending all of them except Zod himself back to the Phantom Zone after a destructive battle. An enraged Zod, having lost his purpose for life after losing his troops and means to create a new Krypton, uses his newly gained superhuman abilities, similar to Clark's, to engage in brutal hand-to-hand combat across the city of Metropolis, resulting in more human casualties until Clark kills him by snapping his neck.

Zod's corpse appears in Batman v Superman after Lex Luthor gains access to Kryptonian artifacts left over from the battle of Metropolis, with Luthor taking advantage of Zod's fingerprints to access the scout ship. Zod's body itself is used by Luthor to create a Kryptonian deformity (portrayed by Robin Atkin Downes) to combat Superman, which Luthor calls Superman's "Doomsday". The creature is stronger than the Man of Steel and impervious to nuclear weapons, but Superman and Batman realize its vulnerability to kryptonite, with Superman sacrificing himself to kill the monster with a kryptonite spear crafted by Batman.

Zack Snyder later confirmed that the broken moon visible during Jor-El's journey to the Citadel in Man of Steel was in fact destroyed by the "real" Doomsday created by Krypton, an easter egg for a later appearance, thus confirming that the real Doomsday is alive and out in the universe despite the slaying of the iteration created in Batman v Superman from Zod's corpse.

=== Victor Zsasz ===
Mr. Zsasz (portrayed by Chris Messina) is the right-hand man of Roman Sionis. He also has tally marks carved onto his body for each person he's killed over the years. As part of his duties, he participated in the slaughter of almost the entire Bertinelli crime family to consolidate the power of Black Mask's criminal organization in Gotham City. Though the assault was successful, it would ultimately prove Zsasz's undoing, as one member of the family, the young daughter Helena, escaped. A grown-up Helena tracks down and kills Zsasz as he threatens to kill Dinah Lance before Harley Quinn.

== Supporting characters ==
=== Leota Adebayo ===
Leota Adebayo (née Waller) (portrayed by Danielle Brooks) is Amanda Waller's daughter and a member of Project Butterfly. After being fired from her job at an animal shelter, Waller convinced her to take a job at Project Butterfly to support herself and her wife Keeya. Adebayo is a kindhearted and intelligent woman, albeit naive to the realities of black ops work. She develops a friendship with Peacemaker, due to relating to his experience with an abusive parent and recognizing his vulnerabilities.

=== Henry and Nora Allen ===
Henry Allen (portrayed by Billy Crudup and then by Ron Livingston) is Barry's father. Having been wrongly accused and jailed for murdering his wife and Barry's mother, Nora Allen (portrayed by Maribel Verdú), Henry has accepted his fate, telling Barry to stop visiting him in prison and move on with his life, despite Barry pursuing a degree in criminal justice to work in law enforcement and one day prove his father's innocence.

=== Anthea ===
Anthea (portrayed by Rachel Zegler), known as Ann on Earth, is the third daughter of Atlas and the younger sister of Hespera and Kalypso. Millennia after Atlas' death, Anthea and her sisters sought to recover their father's stamina from the Shazam Family and restore their home realm using the Golden Apple from Hera's sacred tree, while Kalypso also intended to unterraform Earth with Shazam's Magic staff. When Anthea and Hespera objected, Kalypso mortally wounded Hespera and depowered Anthea before planting the Apple and attacking Philadelphia with her army of mythical creatures. After Kalypso's defeat and Billy's sacrifice, Anthea went with Shazam Family to Mount Olympus to bury Batson, but Wonder Woman appears and restore the power of the Staff of the Gods, reviving Billy and restoring Anthea's powers. Anthea then decided to stay on Earth with Freddy and learn more about humanity.

=== Antiope ===
General Antiope (portrayed by Robin Wright) is Hippolyta's sister, right-hand woman and head of Themyscira's armed forces as its most renowned warrior. Unlike her sister, Antiope believes that Diana should be told the truth of her parentage and be trained to fight, which Hippolyta reluctantly allows despite not telling Diana about her true origins. After millennia of fierce training, Diana becomes a greatly skilled warrior under Antiope's tutoring, even surpassing Antiope's skills. After the Germans invade Themyscira during World War I, Antiope takes a bullet for Diana, urging her niece to take action before dying. This leads to Diana and Steve sneaking off the island to try and stop the war, and though they are caught, Hippolyta lets them go, gifting Diana with Antiope's tiara as a memento. Antiope is seen in a flashback in both versions of Justice League, leading the Amazons into battle alongside her sister, mankind, the Atlanteans, Zeus, Ares, and Artemis against the forces of Apokolips, and also appears briefly in Wonder Woman 1984 in a flashback in that film.

Director Patty Jenkins said of Wright's casting, "For Antiope, I needed someone who seems under control and is not overly aggressive, but who is truly a badass." Producer Charles Roven calls the character "the greatest warrior of all time".

=== Atlanna ===
Queen Atlanna (portrayed by Nicole Kidman) is the exiled queen of Atlantis, lover of Thomas Curry, and mother of both Arthur Curry and Orm Marius. Originally the heir to the throne of Atlantis, Atlanna flees to escapes her arranged marriage to Orvax and is rescued by Thomas, after which they fall in love and conceive Arthur. However, after a strike force of Atlantean soldiers attempts to bring her back to Atlantis, Atlanna voluntarily returns to protect Thomas and Arthur, promising to return one day. She goes through the marriage and conceives Orm, also adopting and mentoring Mera during the Xebel wars, but after Orvax discovers the existence of Arthur (and fathered an heir to secure his own claim to the throne (as he was only king because he'd married Atlanna, the heir) and the beginning of his-own royal dynasty), he sentences Atlanna to the Trench.

Despite being presumed dead, Atlanna survives in the Trench for 20 years before Arthur and Mera discover her there. Arthur, as the true king of Atlantis, is able to find and possess the Trident of Atlan, allowing the three to return to the surface. Atlanna appears to Orm after he entices Arthur to kill him following their duel for the throne, convincing Orm to accept his imprisonment. She reunites with Thomas at the end of the film as Arthur takes the throne. Kidman was convinced to take the role by director James Wan.

=== Helena Bertinelli / The Huntress ===
Helena Bertinelli (portrayed by Mary Elizabeth Winstead) is a young Italian-American assassin operating in Gotham City and the last surviving member of the Bertinelli Crime Family. When she was child her parents Franco and Maria and younger brother Pino along with all of their relatives were murdered by rival gangster Stefano Galante and his crew in mob hit which became known as the "Bertinelli Massacre". Unbeknownst to her at the time, the hit was sanctioned by Roman Sionis.

Helena managed to survive as her mother and brother shielded her from the gunfire. After it was over one of Don Galante's enforcers noticed that Helena survived and took pity on her. He smuggled her out of the United States and took her to hide in Sicily, Italy where she would live with his brother and father. As time passed, the enforcer's family taught Helena how to fight and defend herself.

Years later she returns to Gotham, USA where she becomes a crossbow-wielding assassin nicknamed The Huntress and vows to punish Don Galante and everyone else for murdering her entire family.

=== Mary Bromfield ===
Mary Bromfield (portrayed by Grace Fulton) is the eldest of the Vazquezes' foster children and acts as their "den mother". Despite running away several times from the Vazquez household at a younger age, she comes to love them as her new family, even expressing sadness at the thought of moving away for college. Billy protects her from a snowplow in his superhero guise as Shazam, and Mary later deduces his identity as the superhero with help from her foster sister Darla. The foster children stop Dr. Sivana from draining Billy's superpowers and are later given powers by Billy to defeat Sivana, after which they bond as a family and create a new hangout at the Rock of Eternity. Michelle Borth portrayed Mary's adult superhero form in Shazam! while Fulton portrayed both her civilian and superhero guises in Shazam! Fury of the Gods.

=== Cassandra Cain ===
Cassandra Cain (portrayed by Ella Jay Basco), is a young thief in Gotham City who was hunted by Black Mask after stealing the Bertinelli diamond from his right-hand, Victor Zsasz.

=== Cleo Cazo / Ratcatcher 2 ===
Cleo Cazo (portrayed by Daniela Melchior) is a Portuguese immigrant who took on her late father's role as the Ratcatcher (or Caça-Ratos in Portuguese), a rodent exterminator-turned vagabond vigilante. She utilizes her father's technology, which allows her to communicate with and control rats, keeping one named Sebastian (voiced by Dee Bradley Baker) as a pet. After Cleo moves to the United States, she aims to live the "American Dream" but winds up following in her father's footsteps, dubbing herself Ratcatcher 2 (Caça-Ratos 2 in Portuguese), and robs banks until she is apprehended in Gotham City and imprisoned at Belle Reve Penitentiary. She is then recruited onto a second Suicide Squad sent to Corto Maltese, where she helps the team fulfil a mission to destroy the Jötunheim prison/lab complex and take down Starro. Cleo deals the fatal blow to the alien, as she is able to summon the island's entire rat population to chew Starro to death after Harley Quinn pierces a hole in its eye.

Despite her troubled background, Cleo has a bubbly personality and big heart and is friendly to her colleagues, developing a close bond with Bloodsport and King Shark, in particular. She is the first incarnation of the Ratcatcher to be female, and is an original character created for The Suicide Squad, described by James Gunn as the "heart of the film".

=== Adrian Chase / Vigilante ===
Adrian Chase / Vigilante (portrayed by Freddie Stroma) is a vigilante who admires Peacemaker, having known him in high school and looked up to him as a big brother figure. Vigilante is depicted as a foolish sociopath who brutally kills lawbreakers regardless of the severity of their crime.

=== Jenny Kord ===
Jenny Kord (portrayed by Bruna Marquezine), is the daughter of the second Blue Beetle, Ted Kord, and the current CEO of Kord Industries. After the disappearance of her father, Kord came into conflict with her aunt Victoria Kord for wanting to get the Khaji-Da scarab, which she gave to Jaime Reyes. The scarab bonded with Reyes, so Kord, Jaime and Rudy Reyes looked for a way to separate them. After Reyes' kidnapping on Pago Island, Kord and the Reyes family banded together to save him, facing off against Victoria, wiping out all of Reyes' samples. Kord later took over at Kord Industries and began a relationship with Reyes.

=== Thomas Curry ===
Thomas Curry (portrayed by Temuera Morrison) is Arthur Curry's father and the human lover of Queen Atlanna. A lighthouse keeper in Maine, Thomas rescues Atlanna from the shore and nurses her back to health, with the two eventually falling in love and conceiving Arthur. After Atlantean soldiers attempt to kidnap Atlanna, she fends them off, but leaves Thomas and Arthur behind, promising to one day return. Thomas visits the piers every morning awaiting Atlanna's return to no avail, but is eventually reunited with her after Arthur and Mera rescue her from the Trench. Thomas is portrayed as having a higher alcohol tolerance than his son despite Arthur's half-Atlantean genetics.

Morrison revealed that Jason Momoa had advocated for his casting as Thomas Curry, especially as he had starred in one of Momoa's favorite films growing up, Once Were Warriors.

=== Darla Dudley ===
Darla Dudley (portrayed by Faithe Herman ) is the youngest of the Vazquezes' foster children. A good-natured and energetic child, Darla loves her foster family unconditionally and easily accepts Billy when he moves in. She discovers Billy is the superhero Shazam when she spots him and Freddy returning late one night. When Billy volunteers to give his superpowers to Dr. Sivana in exchange for keeping his family safe, Darla leads the foster children to the Rock of Eternity to thwart Sivana's actions. After they escape and are threatened by Sivana, Billy endows Darla, Freddy, Mary, and the other children with his powers, allowing them to defeat Sivana. Meagan Good portrays Darla's superhero form, who often utilizes her super speed in similar fashion to Barry Allen / Flash.

=== John Economos ===
John Economos (portrayed by Steve Agee) is the somewhat bumbling but well-meaning warden of Belle Reve Penitentiary as well as an A.R.G.U.S. agent. Economos, along with the rest of the Task Force X command staff, rebels against Waller after realizing she intends to allow Starro to rampage through Corto Maltese. Economos and Harcourt are subsequently reassigned to Project Butterfly as punishment.

Economos is initially bullied by Peacemaker, only to earn his respect after Economos saves his life. After the Butterflies are defeated, Economos is reinstated as warden; however, he is reassigned to the headquarters where he works on Project Sanctuary. There, he grows increasingly dissatisfied with how the new director, Rick Flag Sr., runs the agency, leading him to leave and co-found Checkmate.

Later, he locates Billy Batson / Shazam to recruit him into the Justice Society.

=== Jor-El and Lara Lor-Van ===
Jor-El (portrayed by Russell Crowe) and Lara Lor-Van (portrayed by Ayelet Zurer) are Kal-El/Clark Kent's biological parents from Krypton. Jor-El is the planet's chief scientist while Lara is part of the planet's Thinker Guild. Both were genetically engineered from Kryptonian technology like the rest of the planet's population and assigned roles in society including their occupation and marriage, but decide to conceive a child from natural means, resulting in Kal-El's birth.

After trying in vain to persuade the Kryptonian High Council to evacuate the doomed planet, Jor-El steals the Codex containing genetic information for future Kryptonians and infuses it with his son before he and Lara send Kal-El to Earth in a spacecraft, fending off a coup by General Zod long enough for their son's ship to escape. Zod executes Jor-El before he and his followers are captured and sentenced to the Phantom Zone, while Lara survives until the planet's implosion from over-mining its core.

Jor-El and Lara leave their son with a holographic computer program embedded in the ship's key, which simulates Jor-El's knowledge and personality. Clark uses the key to activate a dormant Kryptonian scout ship, after which his father's uploaded Artificial Intelligence teaches him the history of Krypton and explains why he and Lara sent Kal to Earth. When Zod and his followers escape the Phantom Zone, locate Clark, and begin to invade the Earth, Clark gives the key to Lois while on board Zod's ship, uploading Jor-El's program into the mainframe, allowing the program to aid Clark and Lois in escaping and informing them on how to defeat Zod's forces. Zod encounters Jor-El's AI when stealing the scout ship, wiping the program off the ship after some banter. The key with Jor-El's AI is ultimately destroyed when Emil Hamilton uses it to activate Kal-El's spacecraft and crash with Zod's mothership, sending the Kryptonians except for Superman and Zod back to the Phantom Zone.

=== Kara Zor-El / Supergirl ===
Kara Zor-El / Supergirl (portrayed by Sasha Calle) is a powerful Kryptonian with powers, abilities, and a costume similar to Superman, who is also Supergirl's cousin.

=== Rick Flag ===
Rick Flag Jr. (portrayed by Joel Kinnaman) is a United States Army Special Forces colonel and one of the leaders of Task Force X. At first, he and his Navy SEALs do not get along with the squad sent to neutralize Enchantress in Midway City, and he is seen by the squad as a stern, authoritarian figure. Following Waller's supposed death, Flag finally opens up to the squad and allows them to walk free, but they decide to help him complete the mission as it is revealed that he had fallen in love with June Moone before she was possessed by Enchantress. After the squad defeats Enchantress and frees Moone, Flag remains the squad leader, and he and Deadshot gain a mutual respect for one another.

Flag is later assigned to lead a new squad sent to Corto Maltese, reuniting with subordinates Harley Quinn and Captain Boomerang, but the team is almost immediately wiped out. He manages to escape and finds refuge with Corto Maltesean rebels until a second Suicide Squad, which the first was only a decoy by Waller to let the other entering the island undetected, finds him, led by his former military comrade Bloodsport. When he and a surviving Quinn join the second squad, they successfully infiltrate the location of Project Starfish and its main asset, the alien Starro, but discover that they were sent to not only destroy the project, but wipe out evidence of the American government's ties to it. Flag attempts to leak it, but is stopped by and killed by teammate Peacemaker, who Waller assigned to still scrub the data. Despite this, Peacemaker is haunted by Flag's death as he takes on a new mission afterwards.

While Tom Hardy was originally cast in the role for Suicide Squad, he ran into scheduling conflicts, resulting in Kinnaman being cast as Flag. Kinnaman opined that Flag is characterized as "all business" in the first Suicide Squad film, but states that the film's sequel was an opportunity to give the character a blank slate, and said Flag was sillier, less jaded, more naive, and funnier compared to his portrayal in the first film.

=== Freddy Freeman ===
Freddy Freeman (portrayed by Jack Dylan Grazer) is one of Billy Batson's new foster siblings upon being adopted by the Vazquezes. Despite needing a crutch to walk and being bullied at school as a result, Freddy maintains a fanatical personality and greatly admires the Justice League. Billy is annoyed by Freddy at first, but after gaining his superpowers, comes to an enthusiastic Freddy for advice. After feuding over Billy's newfound internet fame, Billy and Freddy make amends when they are threatened by Dr. Sivana. Billy then shares his superpowers with Freddy, Mary, and the other foster children, allowing them to defeat Sivana and bond as a family. Adam Brody plays Freddy's adult superhero form.

=== Gaius Grieves / The Thinker ===
Gaius Grieves (portrayed by Peter Capaldi) is a mad scientist from Corto Maltese who had been overseeing Project Starfish for 30 years. He would later join the new regime led by General Presidente Silvio Luna and Mayor General Mateo Suarez since he is the only person capable of controlling Starro, as the new regime aims to weaponize the alien against major superpowers such as Russia, the U.S., and China.

30 years before the events of The Suicide Squad, Grieves had been hired to oversee Project Starfish after the Corto Maltesean government agreed to bring Project Starfish over to the island from an American space station. Task Force X captures him so they could infiltrate Jötunheim, where Starro is being kept and prisoners are used as test subjects. Grieves later reveals to Cleo Cazo and Rick Flag that the squad had been sent to Corto Maltese to destroy any evidence of the U.S. government's involvement with the project. After explosives planted by the squad prematurely go off, the building begins to collapse, freeing Starro, who grabs Grieves and tears him apart.

=== Carter Hall / Hawkman ===
Carter Hall (portrayed by Aldis Hodge) is a wealthy museum curator who doubles as the superhero Hawkman, owing his abilities to a special suit and equipment made of Nth Metal. Hall is the leader of the Justice Society, whom Amanda Waller contacts to contain the newly released Teth-Adam. The team fights Adam in Khandaq but are befuddled as the country's people support Adam for fighting off their Intergang occupiers. After Ishmael Gregor emerges as Sabbac, Hall and the Justice Society return to fight him but realize they need Teth-Adam back to stop him, and after Doctor Fate sacrifices himself to free Adam, Hawkman gains Fate's helmet and uses it to help Adam kill Sabbac. Despite coming to a truce and leaving Adam to defend and protect Khandaq, Hawkman and Adam nonetheless develop a rivalry over the latter's brutality and willingness to kill his adversaries, and he is the last one to trust Adam in the Justice Society.

=== Emilia Harcourt ===
Emilia Harcourt (portrayed by Jennifer Holland) is an A.R.G.U.S. agent. An experienced field officer, Harcourt previously worked for the CIA and the NSA. Harcourt serves as part of the Task Force X command staff, and rebels against Amanda Waller after she decides to allow Starro to rampage through Corto Maltese, providing intel to Task Force X to quell the rampage. As punishment, Harcourt is reassigned to Project Butterfly. Though she initially despises her teammates, especially Peacemaker, Harcourt gradually warms to them and later becomes the leader of the operation following Murn's (Ik Nobe Lok) death. She is later seen in charge of the underwater Task Force X facility that temporarily holds Black Adam and several other criminals in stasis until Doctor Fate helps Adam escape to take down Sabbac. Later, she locates Billy Batson / Shazam to recruit him into the Justice Society.

=== George "Digger" Harkness / Captain Boomerang ===
George "Digger" Harkness (portrayed by Jai Courtney) is a notorious Australian criminal whose main weapon is a weaponized boomerang, gaining the moniker Captain Boomerang. After robbing every bank in Australia and making his way to the U.S., Harkness begins robbing jewelry stores and banks before he is apprehended by Barry Allen / The Flash. While serving three life sentences at Belle Reve Penitentiary, he is recruited into the first roster of Task Force X by Amanda Waller. Despite bickering with the rest of the team at first, Harkness gradually warms to them and helps them prevent Enchantress from destroying the world.

After being returned to prison without any rewards like the rest of his surviving squad members, Harkness later breaks out of jail and is seen on a "wanted" poster in Birds of Prey. He is reincarcerated some time before the events of The Suicide Squad and reunites with former teammate Harley Quinn and leader Rick Flag on a second Suicide Squad sent to Corto Maltese. Captain Boomerang is one of several fatalities on the ill-fated mission, as he is inadvertently sliced to death by a helicopter downed by one of his teammates.

As depicted in the DCEU, Harkness has a sarcastic, crude personality, and is seen backstabbing his colleagues, such as tricking Slipknot into escaping to see if the explosive devices planted into the squad members are real in Suicide Squad. He is also a skilled thief and weapons specialist, but suffers from psychosis and is described by Amanda Waller as a "deranged lunatic". However, he is not without empathy, which he later comes to show for his teammates.

=== Hippolyta ===
Hippolyta (portrayed by Connie Nielsen) is the immortal Amazon queen of Themyscira (DC Comics) and the mother of Diana. She is overly protective of her daughter, who aspires to become one of the Amazon warriors, telling her that she was "sculpted from clay and given life by Zeus" when in actuality Zeus is Diana's biological father, and thus Diana is the "Godkiller" that was left by the Old God. Despite sheltering Diana, Hippolyta reluctantly has her daughter trained harder than any other Amazon after her sister, Antiope, convinces her otherwise. Hippolyta interrogates Steve Trevor after he is caught with Diana and inadvertently leads the Germans to Themyscira, which sees many Amazons die in battle.

The queen is seen as a capable warrior and commander in both versions of Justice League in flashbacks and the present day. She leads the Amazons into battle with Antiope against the forces of Apokolips during the first invasion of Earth, and leads stiff resistance to Steppenwolf in the present day though he overpowers the Amazons, taking the Mother Box guarded on Themyscira. She then fires a warning shot into the shrine of the Amazons to inform her daughter of the new invasion.

=== Maxine Hunkel / Cyclone ===
Maxine Hunkel (portrayed by Quintessa Swindell), also known as Cyclone, is an eager and anxious aerokinetic superhero and a new member of the Justice Society.

=== Waylon Jones / Killer Croc ===
Waylon Jones (portrayed by Adewale Akinnuoye-Agbaje), is a metahuman cannibal originating from Gotham City, with a rare skin disease and genetically regressive atavism, which gives his skin a grey, scaly appearance (resembling that of a crocodile's) being given the nickname Killer Croc.

=== Jonathan and Martha Kent ===
Jonathan (portrayed by Kevin Costner) and Martha Kent (portrayed by Diane Lane) are Clark Kent's adoptive parents on Earth. They are farmers from Smallville, Kansas, who discover Kal-El in his ship shortly after arriving on Earth. Both Jonathan and Martha are loving parents, caring for Clark as their own despite his superhuman abilities and otherworldly origins that result in isolation from his classmates and shaping his morality. Jonathan believes that Clark was sent to Earth for a reason, but encourages his adoptive son to conceal his powers until the opportune time. He ultimately dies in a tornado while directing trapped motorists to safety and rescuing the family dog, refusing to be saved by Clark to protect his son's secret, a departure from the comics and previous adaptations that have him die of a heart attack.

Martha remains optimistic despite her and Jonathan's inability to have biological children and her husband's death. After Clark travels the world to find his identity following Jonathan's death, he visits Martha in Smallville after discovering his roots. Their reunion is short-lived as General Zod's forces arrive on Earth, and they make their way to the Kent farm, demanding Martha to tell them where Clark's spaceship is, which she refuses. Clark comes to his mother's aid and attacks Zod when he threatens her life, though her house is damaged. Martha continues to be a confidante to Clark when he moves to Metropolis to take a journalist job with the Daily Planet and starts serving more as Superman. She is kidnapped by Lex Luthor, who forces Superman to kill Batman in exchange for her life, but Lois Lane allows the two superheroes to come to an understanding and team up, with Batman rescuing Martha. She is devastated when Clark loses his life fighting Doomsday as Superman, sharing her grief with Lois. By the events of Justice League, Martha's home is foreclosed by the bank and she is forced to move out. She is reunited with her son after the Justice League revives him, and Bruce Wayne manages to buy her house back from the bank after the team, including Superman, defeats the forces of Apokolips.

While Costner and Lane's performances have both been lauded, Jonathan Kent's characterization and actions in Man of Steel have drawn controversy, though Adam Ozimek of Forbes writes that Jonathan maintained a calculating, utilitarian mindset in attempting to mask Clark's abilities, a departure from most cinema tropes.

=== Abner Krill / Polka-Dot Man ===
Abner Krill (portrayed by David Dastmalchian) is a metahuman who sprouts explosive polka dot-shaped pustles on his skin before releasing them, gaining the nickname Polka-Dot Man. The son of a mad scientist working at S.T.A.R. Labs, Krill and his siblings were all deliberately-exposed to an interdimensional virus in hopes of being turned into superheroes. As a result of his traumatic upbringing, Polka-Dot Man perceives everyone around him as his mother. He kills her and is sent to Belle Reve as a result before being recruited into the second Suicide Squad sent to Corto Maltese. Krill starts to overcome his trauma while serving with the Suicide Squad, but accidentally sets off the bombs for the Jötunheim facility prematurely. He redeems himself by using his polka-dots to assault Starro when the team decides to defy Amanda Waller's orders and defend Corto Maltese, but he is crushed to death by the alien.

James Gunn describes Krill / Polka-Dot Man as an "experiment gone wrong" and "the dumbest DC character of all time", but aimed to turn him into a tragic character for the film.

=== Dinah Lance / Black Canary ===
Dinah Lance (portrayed by Jurnee Smollett) is a metahuman initially serving as a singer and later a driver for Roman Sionis. She has the ability to overwhelm opponents with extremely high-pitched soundwaves. Harley Quinn first encounters Dinah when she drunkenly walks into Sionis's bar, and Dinah saves her from being abducted. Despite her abilities, Lance wants little to do with crime fighting or being a "do-gooder", but is inspired by Harley, Helena Bertinelli, and Renee Montoya to turn on Sionis. Dinah, Helena, and Montoya later form their own vigilante group.

=== Lois Lane ===
Lois Lane (portrayed by Amy Adams) is an investigative reporter for the Daily Planet who first encounters Clark Kent in Man of Steel as she is covering the discovery of a Kryptonian scout ship in Northern Canada. When Clark saves her from the ship's technology, she becomes intrigued by him, going far lengths to discover his identity and superpowers and falling in love with him in the process. She and Clark start dating after he takes a job at the Planet following the battle of Metropolis, which sees him rescuing her several times as Superman as she aids him and the U.S. Military in quelling the invasion by General Zod. Lois is instrumental in discovering Lex Luthor's deceptiveness in Batman v Superman, risking her own life several times to uncover evidence against him and standing up to him even as he captures her to lure Superman out of hiding. She is also instrumental in keeping Clark motivated to do the right thing in all three films in which he is a primary character.

Adams became the eighth actress to take on the role of Lois in live action upon landing the part in Man of Steel. Despite not having as much fighting prowess as previous depictions, the DCEU version of Lois is depicted as more intelligent and level-headed than in the past.

=== Mera ===
Y'Mera Xebella Challa (portrayed by Amber Heard), also known as Mera, is the Queen of Atlantis as Arthur's wife. Originally she is a princess from the underwater kingdom of Xebel who was raised by Queen Atlanna of Atlantis for part of her childhood. She has aquatic superpowers like Arthur Curry. She is originally betrothed to Orm Marius, but later rejects him when he refuses to reconsider waging war with the surface. After she meets Arthur for the first time as they unsuccessfully attempt to keep Steppenwolf from taking the Atlantean Mother Box, Mera convinces Arthur to fight the New God with the Justice League and following Steppenwolf's defeat, comes to him again to persuade him to fight for the throne. After she gains Arthur's trust by saving his father, Thomas, from a tsunami summoned by Orm, Mera ventures with Arthur as he seeks the Trident of King Atlan, with the two falling in love in the process despite constantly bickering early on. She is by Arthur's side when he takes the throne. Mera also appears in Bruce Wayne's second "Knightmare" premonition, joining Batman's insurgency after Arthur is slain by Darkseid in that timeline. In Aquaman and the Lost Kingdom, Arthur and Mera are married, they are parents to Arthur Curry Jr. Mera joins Arthur in the mission to save their son who has been kidnapped by Black Manta. In the midst of which she saves Arthur twice and manages to rescue their baby boy.

Amber Heard was first cast as Mera in 2016. In Zack Snyder's Justice League, the director's cut of the 2017 theatrical release, Mera noticeably speaks with a British accent whereas in the theatrical cut and Aquaman, Heard utilizes her usual American accent in her portrayal of the character.

=== Renee Montoya ===
Renee Montoya (portrayed by Rosie Perez) is a cynical, alcoholic detective in the Gotham City Police Department building a case against Roman Sionis.

=== Clemson Murn / Ik Nobe Lok ===
Clemson Murn (portrayed by Chukwudi Iwuji) is the leader of Project Butterfly and an infamous black ops agent. Murn is eventually revealed to be a rogue Butterfly himself, Ik Nobe Llok, who had killed and possessed the actual Murn so he could stop the rest of his kind's invasion of Earth. "Murn" is killed by the Butterflies during the raid on Project Butterfly's headquarters.

=== Nanaue / King Shark ===
Nanaue (voiced by Sylvester Stallone), more commonly known as King Shark, is a demigod shark-human hybrid. Rumored to be the offspring of a shark god, Nanaue is a kind-hearted but childish individual who is misunderstood due to his appearance, monosyllabic speech, ravenous appetite, and taste for human flesh. On the other hand, he can turn violent and aggressive to his opponents, often consuming them or tearing them to pieces. He had presumably turned to a life of crime before being incarcerated at Belle Reve, and is sent with the second team with Cleo, her pet rat Sebastian, Bloodsport, Peacemaker, and Polka-Dot Man to Corto Maltese. Nanaue forms a close bond with Cleo despite attempting to eat her earlier, and is one of five survivors on the team along with Cleo, Sebastian, Harley Quinn, and Bloodsport.

Steve Agee provided on-set motion capture performance for King Shark during filming. The 2016 Suicide Squad film was originally going to feature King Shark, but it would only have been possible as a fully CGI character according to director David Ayer. The former's replacement Killer Croc was portrayed practically with makeup and prosthetics. James Gunn initially used a hammerhead shark design from the New 52 comics, but found it awkward to film the character with other actors due to his eyes being on the sides of his head. He settled on a great white shark design similar to the one seen in the Harley Quinn (2019–present) animated series, though this was a coincidence as that series was released after filming for The Suicide Squad began. Gunn gave King Shark a dad bod to make him look less like a mammal, as well as small eyes, a big mouth, and a small head to avoid the "cute anthropomorphic beast" design seen in popular characters like Baby Groot from his Guardians of the Galaxy films and The Mandalorian's Grogu.

=== Kent Nelson / Doctor Fate ===
Kent Nelson (portrayed by Pierce Brosnan) is an academic who doubles as the superhero Doctor Fate, possessing a mystical golden helmet that allows several sorcery abilities, including astral projection and clairvoyance. Nelson is the Justice Society's most senior member at 100 years old and a close friend and confidante to Carter Hall, and his calm, contemplative personality contrasts with Hall's brashness and uptightness. Doctor Fate is more open to accepting Adam despite his barbaric method of dealing with adversaries. After turning in a remorseful Adam to Amanda Waller and Task Force X, Fate sees a premonition of Hall's impending death and a demonic threat that happens to be Sabbac. He sacrifices himself to fight Sabbac alone, holding up against the demon while releasing Adam from his imprisonment with Task Force X, until he is taken down by Sabbac, after which Adam and the other Justice Society members defeat the demon, with Hawkman being granted control of Fate's helmet until he lets it go after the battle.

One of the earliest superheroes from the Golden Age of Comics, Doctor Fate makes his first film appearance in Black Adam, over 80 years after his debut. Pierce Brosnan stated the potential for his character to appear in future DCEU films despite his death in Black Adam.

=== King Nereus ===
Nereus (portrayed by Dolph Lundgren) is Mera's father and the king of Xebel as portrayed in Aquaman, despite Mera claiming that both her parents were killed in the Xebel wars in Zack Snyder's Justice League. Nereus dismisses King Orm's proposal of an alliance, seeing through Orm's desire to become Ocean Master, until the salvaged submarine is used to stage an attack, convincing Nereus to reluctantly agree to fight with Orm. Nereus is fiercely protective of Mera, even when she sides with Arthur, and stops Orm from killing the Brine King during the final battle. He believes Mera when she tells him Arthur has the Trident of Atlan, and recognizes Arthur as king of the oceans when he defeats Orm.

=== Alfred Pennyworth ===
Alfred Pennyworth (portrayed by Jeremy Irons) is Bruce Wayne's personal butler, having raised him since his parents' murders. This iteration of the character is portrayed as a former member of the Special Air Service and has a cynical and sarcastic personality, offering playful banter with Bruce in addition to providing high-tech support for him while in action as Batman. Unlike the often-tunnel-visioned Bruce, Alfred is more perceptive and serves as a devil's advocate, recognizing that Superman may not be as hostile as Batman believes. Regardless, Alfred is unwaveringly loyal to Bruce, and in turn helps the Justice League when they combat Steppenwolf and his Parademon minions. Alfred is also handy with technology, taking on the role often filled by Lucius Fox in the comics.

=== Al Rothstein / Atom Smasher ===
Al Rothstein (portrayed by Noah Centineo), also known as Atom Smasher, is a metahuman with the power to increase his size, a member to the Justice Society, and the nephew of Al Pratt. Inspired by his uncle and having trained to become a vigilante, Rothstein undertook his first mission, successfully stopping a weapons trade, receiving his uncle's suit and inheriting the mantle of Atom Smasher.

=== Chato Santana / El Diablo ===
Chato Santana (portrayed by Jay Hernandez), also known as El Diablo, is a former gang leader from Los Angeles with the power of pyrokinesis. After a period of using his powers to great influence, he is incarcerated sometime after he accidentally kills his wife and two children in a moment of anger and deeply regrets their deaths. Santana is later recruited by Amanda Waller into Task Force X. Unlike his teammates, Santana desires to stay out of the fight and refuses to use his powers out of fear of needlessly hurting the innocent but later comes to use them to protect his teammates. He ultimately sacrifices himself to help the Suicide Squad bring down Enchantress and Incubus, though in the unreleased "Ayer Cut" of the film, he survives.

=== Shazam (wizard) ===
Shazam (portrayed by Djimon Hounsou) is the last surviving member of the Council of Wizards. Having failed to find a successor to take on his powers and rejected Thaddeus Sivana for his selfishness, Shazam calls out to Billy Batson, transporting him to the Rock of Eternity, and despite Billy not taking it seriously, Shazam finds Billy suitable, giving him his powers before crumbling to dust. Shazam! marks Hounsou's second DCEU role, as he had previously played King Ricou in Aquaman.

=== Stephen Shin ===
Dr. Stephen Shin (portrayed by Randall Park) is a fanatical scientist trying to prove the existence of Atlantis, as seen on his appearances on televised talk shows. He later finds Black Manta adrift and rescues him, with Manta offering to show him Atlantis in exchange for information on Aquaman.

=== Seven Deadly Sins ===
The Seven Deadly Sins, Pride, Envy, Greed, Wrath, Sloth, Gluttony and Lust, are portrayed as seven demons initially imprisoned as statues at the Rock of Eternity. As established in Shazam!, Black Adam freed them thousands of years ago but caused extensive damage and death, causing the wizard Shazam, the last surviving Wizard on the Rock, to imprison all of them. When Dr. Sivana frees the sins by taking the Eye of Sin, they use his body as a host and grant him magical powers, which he uses to kill his family and wreak havoc. However, once they are drawn out of his body, he is left powerless. Billy Batson and his foster siblings use this to defeat Sivana and the Sins, recapturing the Sins into their statues on the Rock.

The Seven Deadly Sins are CGI characters, portrayed via motion capture by unnamed stunt doubles and voiced by Steve Blum, Darin De Paul, and Fred Tatasciore.

=== Silas and Elinore Stone ===
Silas Stone (portrayed by Joe Morton) is the head of S.T.A.R. Labs and the father of Victor Stone. Due to his job, Silas is often held up at work and unable to spend time with his wife and son, causing a rift between Silas and Victor. After the accident that kills his wife, Elinore (portrayed by Karen Bryson), and gravely injures Victor, Silas, unable to see his son die, uses the Mother Box being studied at S.T.A.R. Labs to revive Victor and regenerate his lost body parts, though this turns him into a cybernetic being. Silas helps hide Victor at his apartment and declares him dead to ward off attention, but is unable to reconnect with his son, who despises his new form and blames Silas for Elinore's death. Silas leaves Victor with a tape on how to utilize his abilities. When Steppenwolf kidnaps Silas and other S.T.A.R. Labs employees in search of the Mother Box, Victor springs to action and joins Bruce Wayne's team, managing to save them.

In both versions of Justice League, Silas is portrayed as remorseful for not being able to spend time with his family and showing exceptional courage, as he refuses to tell Steppenwolf the location of the Mother Box despite being tortured. The theatrical cut and the director's cut portray his arc differently: in the former, Silas survives the events of the film and works with Victor to adjust his cybernetic parts at the end, though much of his role is reduced, while in the director's cut, Silas allows the Justice League to enter the S.T.A.R. Labs facility with Superman's body in an attempt to resurrect him. When Steppenwolf is alerted to the Mother Box's presence after it is used to revive Superman, Silas runs back into the facility with the box, sacrificing his own life to superheat it with Ryan Choi's laser heating device before Steppenwolf inevitably retrieves it. This allows Victor and Bruce Wayne to track it to Russia and prevent the Unity. Victor later listens to his father's encouragement on the tape after the latter's death, and Ryan is promoted to take over Silas' oversight of nanotechnology and the Kryptonian scout ship.

=== Calvin Swanwick / Martian Manhunter ===
Calvin Swanwick (portrayed by Harry Lennix) is introduced as a lieutenant general in the United States Northern Command in Man of Steel, later becoming Secretary of Defense by the events of Batman v Superman. He initially does not trust Superman upon interrogating him prior to turning in the Man of Steel to General Zod, but later proves to be an ally to both Superman and Lois Lane, as he provides Lois with evidence against Lex Luthor and provides Superman with military aid against Zod and the Kryptonian monstrosity created by Luthor. Swanwick is revealed as the Martian Manhunter in Zack Snyder's Justice League, having the ability to shapeshift and impersonate others and being the last surviving member of the Martian race. He masquerades as Martha Kent while encouraging Lois to reenter society and resume her job after Superman's death, and visits Bruce Wayne in his true Martian form after Bruce forms the Justice League, thanking him for doing so and promising to be in touch to plan for Darkseid's inevitable return to Earth after Steppenwolf is defeated.

Fans began speculating that Swanwick was the Martian Manhunter after viewing Superman's interrogation scene in Man of Steel, in which Swanwick continues to confront Superman after he effortlessly breaks his chains and walks towards the window while everyone else backs away. While Swanwick was not initially meant to be the Martian Manhunter in the film, Lennix stated that "someone else" wanted him to be in a future film. Director Zack Snyder stated that Swanwick would be retconned to be the Manhunter in his original cut of Justice League, but that the scene was not completed until additional filming for the director's cut, in which Lennix took part.

=== Adrianna Tomaz ===
Adrianna Tomaz (portrayed by Sarah Shahi) is a widowed Khandaqi archaeologist and resistance fighter who seeks to find and hide the Crown of Sabbac before it winds up in the wrong hands, especially in light of the country's occupiers. When she and her colleagues are cornered by Intergang, by whom she is a wanted fugitive, Adrianna recites an inscription in the rocks, which frees Teth-Adam from his 5,000 year imprisonment and allows him to slaughter the Intergang personnel while allowing Adrianna to escape with her brother Karim and the crown. She, Karim and her son Amon provide shelter for an exhausted Adam, believing him to be the fabled champion who freed Khandaq from the tyrannical rule of King Ahk-Ton, but the Justice Society arrives to arrest Adam, explaining his true nature. Adrianna is torn between helping Adam and cooperating with the Justice Society but values her son's life more than anything. When her former colleague Ishmael Gregor, who reveals himself as Ahk-Ton's descendant, demands the crown for Amon's life, she complies, but Ishmael shoots at Amon anyways, prompting Adam to step in and kill Ishmael while saving Amon. This, however, allows Ishmael to be reborn as Sabbac and terrorize Khandaq. Adrianna, Amon, and Karim rally the people of Khandaq to rise up against Sabbac's army of skeletons as Teth-Adam and the Justice Society take down Sabbac.

=== Amon Tomaz ===
Amon Tomaz (portrayed by Bodhi Sabongui), is the son of Adrianna Tomaz. Growing up under the rule of Intergang in Kahndaq, Amon always waited for a superhero to come and save them. Eventually, Tomaz and his uncle Karim were tasked by Adrianna to recover and hide a totem from Intergang's hands, ultimately setting out to find the Crown of Sabbac.

=== Steve Trevor ===
Captain Steve Trevor (portrayed by Chris Pine) is an American fighter pilot working as a spy on behalf of MI6 during World War I. After stealing a notebook from Dr. Isabel Maru while undercover at an Ottoman base, Steve steals a plane and crash-lands on Themyscira, being rescued by Diana while inadvertently leading a German fleet onto the hidden island. After a bloody battle ensues between the Germans and the Amazons, in which Antiope dies, Steve is captured by the Amazons, revealing his occupation as a spy and describing the Great War. Moved to act, Diana breaks him out and leaves Themyscira with him in an attempt to stop the war, which she presumes is caused by Ares. The two are inspired by each other's bravery and fall in love in the process while stopping a plot by the God of War, General Ludendorf, and Dr. Maru to prolong the war.

Though Steve sacrifices his life destroying the deadlier form of mustard gas being concocted by Dr. Maru at the end of Wonder Woman, Diana remembers him dearly to the point that she inadvertently brings him back to life upon encountering the Dream Stone in Wonder Woman 1984 before realizing the grave consequences of her wish. Steve convinces her to let go of him and renounce her wish, helping her regain her powers and defeat Max Lord and Cheetah.

=== Nuidis Vulko ===
Nuidis Vulko (portrayed by Willem Dafoe) is Queen Atlanna's trusted enforcer and Arthur's mentor. Though he later becomes King Orm Marius's right-hand man, Vulko discreetly trains Arthur after Atlanna's banishment to the Trench, believing Arthur to be the rightful heir to the throne of Atlantis, though Arthur runs away and begins resenting the Atlanteans after Vulko reveals Atlanna's sentence and presumed death. Vulko gives Arthur his mother's trident in Zack Snyder's Justice League when Steppenwolf hunts for the Atlantean Mother Box, enticing him to defend the device when Orm refuses to send more resources to guard it. He later provides aid to Arthur following Steppenwolf's defeat despite giving the impression of advising Orm, though he is arrested and detained when Orm deduces Vulko's true allegiance. After Mera frees him, Vulko personally arrests Orm after Arthur defeats the latter for the crown. Vulko is revealed to have died prior to the events of Aquaman and the Lost Kingdom, having succumbed to a plague caused by extreme climatic conditions.

Vulko's appearance in the theatrical version of Justice League was removed, but restored in the director's cut.

=== Amanda Waller ===
Amanda Waller (portrayed by Viola Davis) is an intelligence officer with A.R.G.U.S. and the FBI serving as the head of Task Force X, also known as the Suicide Squad. She is a cold, calculating individual, staying consistent to the comics, with unused material from Suicide Squad showing how ruthless and diabolical she truly is, as she ultimately has little to no concern for most of the squad's members, often taking advantage of them and tossing them aside when they serve her no further purpose. Despite her diabolical tendencies, Waller is also an occasional ally to Batman and the Justice League.

=== Bruce Wayne / Batman ===
Bruce Wayne (portrayed by Michael Keaton) is a billionaire who became a vigilante known as Batman after the death of his parents, before retiring after Gotham City was out of crime. In his retirement, Wayne was found by Barry Allen and his past self to ask for his help in their quest to stop Zod, to which Wayne agreed, helping Allen regain his powers, joining them and Kara Zor-El. This version of Wayne/Batman is an alternate variant of the primary DCEU Batman, having appeared previously in Tim Burton's Batman (1989) and its sequel Batman Returns (1992).

=== Iris West ===
Iris West (portrayed by Kiersey Clemons) is introduced in the director's cut of Justice League as Barry Allen bumps into her on his way to a job interview at a dog-sitting business, with the two becoming instantly smitten with each other. As she drives off, she gets into an accident with a distracted truck driver and Barry leaves his interview midway to protect her from injury with his speed before rushing back. Iris has a more extended role in The Flash.

== Minor characters ==
=== Debuting in Man of Steel ===
==== Dr. Emil Hamilton ====
Emil Hamilton (portrayed by Richard Schiff) is a scientist with DARPA also appearing with Col. Hardy and General Swanwick as Lois arrives in Canada. He is also present during Superman's interrogation, in which the latter is able to see his name tag and a tranquilizing agent being prepared through the reflective glass in the interrogation room. Hamilton is the first to realize Zod and his troops are xenoforming the Earth, and plays a key role in activating the Phantom Drive on Clark's ship before the plane carrying him and Hardy is forced to crash into the Black Zero in a suicide attack, resulting in his and Hardy's deaths in addition to banishing Zod's troops back to the Phantom Zone.

==== Col. Nathan Hardy ====
Nathan Hardy (portrayed by Christopher Meloni) is an officer in the United States Air Force who first appears when Lois arrives in Canada to cover the discovery of the Kryptonian scout ship. He later assists the FBI in tracking her down when it is discovered she knows of Clark's origins. When the Kryptonians start attacking the Earth, Hardy is part of the military response, and as his helicopter is shot down, faces Faora one-on-one despite her enhanced physical abilities and combat skills, gaining her respect. Hardy recognizes Superman's allegiance to mankind rather than Zod's forces, and helps stage an attack on Zod's mother ship, the Black Zero, when Lois and Superman explain how to take it down. When Faora ambushes his air carrier during the attack, Hardy crashes the plane and the activated Phantom Drive of Clark's spacecraft into the mothership in a suicide attack, sending all the Kryptonians except Superman and Zod back to the Phantom Zone.

Hardy's military callsign is "Guardian", a nod to the comics character.

==== Perry White ====
Perry White (portrayed by Laurence Fishburne) is the chief of staff at the Daily Planet and the superior of Lois Lane, Jenny Jurwich, Steve Lombard, and later Clark Kent. He is portrayed as a pragmatic manager and is wary about what the newspaper publishes, criticizing both Clark and Lois at times when they opt to work on riskier stories, though he is shown to have morals and believes Lois' first story on Superman despite persuading her to drop it. White is caught in the battle of Metropolis, assisting Lombard and Jenny in staying safe. He later mourns the reported deaths of both Superman and Clark (unaware they are one and the same) and attends Clark's funeral with Lois and Jenny at the end of Batman v Superman. Fishburne is the first African American actor to portray Perry White in film.

=== Debuting in Batman v Superman: Dawn of Justice ===
==== June Finch ====
June Finch (portrayed by Holly Hunter) is a United States senator from Kentucky who heads the Senate Committee questioning Superman's actions. While she notes Superman's good intentions, she is wary of allowing him to be unrestrained and act without government involvement, given the casualties suffered during the Black Zero event in Metropolis and allegedly with the Nairomi incident. She invites Superman to a public hearing as a result. Lex Luthor invites her to his company and later his quarters to try and persuade her to get an import license for kryptonite, but Finch sees through his altruistic façade and denies his request, angering him. During the trial, which sees Wallace Keefe, a casualty of the Black Zero event, set to testify against Superman, Finch notices Luthor's absence and a jar of urine on her pulpit as she makes her opening statement. This leads to her realizing Luthor's treachery a split second before a bomb concealed in Keefe's wheelchair explodes, killing hundreds inside the U.S. Capitol including Finch.

On her character's views on Superman, Hunter stated, "What is her problem with Superman? That absolute power corrupts absolutely. When power is acting autonomously, unilaterally with no legislation, with no boundaries, with no law, except for the ones that he deems in his own mind, that can be detrimental." Describing her character, Hunter said, "I thought that, you know, as a senator, she brought her female-ness to the job in how she listened, in her curiosity, in her ability to evaluate", adding, "[It] felt very female to me." Hunter also compared the fight between Batman and Superman in the film to that of Greek Gods.

==== Mercy Graves ====
Mercy Graves (portrayed by Tao Okamoto) is Lex Luthor's personal assistant and one of his closest aides, accompanying him throughout much of the film. A woman of few words, Graves is killed in the explosion at the U.S. Capitol during Superman's trial, as Luthor views her as disposable in that situation despite greatly valuing her.

==== Anatoli Knyazev ====
Anatoli Knyazev (portrayed by Callan Mulvey) is a Russian mercenary, terrorist, and smuggler working on behalf of Lex Luthor. He first appears working with General Amajagh in Batman v Superman, opening Jimmy Olsen's camera to find out he is a spy with the CIA. This leads to Lois Lane being held hostage until Superman arrives to rescue her. Knyazev and his men then betray Amajagh's soldiers and cross them, burning their bodies to give the illusion that Superman killed them, leading to his public fallout. Bruce Wayne tracks down Knyazev at an underground fight while trying to track down kryptonite, cloning his phone while conversing with him. Bruce discovers Knyazev's affiliation with Luthor and is able to continue tracking the kryptonite. Meanwhile, Knyazev arranges for Cesar Santos to be murdered in prison, then also assassinates Kahina Ziri when she rats out Luthor to Senator Finch. Knyazev is later responsible for kidnapping Martha Kent and is poised to kill her, but Batman, who comes to an understanding with Superman, arrives at Knyazev's compound and extracts Martha alive while killing Knyazev by shooting his flamethrower tank. Knyazev does not appear as KGBeast and is only a hired gun in the film.

==== Thomas and Martha Wayne ====
Thomas (portrayed by Jeffrey Dean Morgan) and Martha Wayne (portrayed by Lauren Cohan) are Bruce Wayne's deceased parents, slain by an armed mugger in front of a 12-year-old Bruce as the family leaves a theater during a flashback in the film. Their deaths, especially Thomas's last words, "Martha", continue to haunt Bruce in the present day, as he seeks to honor his parents by fighting crime and injustice as Batman in Gotham City. The name "Martha" proves to be a pivotal element in Batman's change of heart in the film as Superman's adoptive mother coincidentally has the same first name, causing a PTSD episode that prevents Batman from carrying out his killing of the Man of Steel when he hears the latter utter the name.

Morgan was previously considered to play Bruce Wayne in the film before being cast as Thomas. The film reunites Morgan with Cohan, as the two are cast members of The Walking Dead.

=== Debuting in Suicide Squad ===
==== Christopher Weiss / Slipknot ====
Christopher Weiss (portrayed by Adam Beach), also known as Slipknot, is a misogynic criminal recruited by Amanda Waller to join the Suicide Squad, being described as "a man who can climb anything". Slipknot dies relatively quickly in the film as Rick Flag executes him with a bomb planted in his neck upon trying to escape, a nod to his arc with the Suicide Squad in the comics.

==== Tatsu Yamashiro / Katana ====
Tatsu Yamashiro (山城 タツ (Yamashiro Tatsu (lit. "Mountain Stronghold Dragon")); portrayed by Karen Fukuhara), also known as Katana, is Rick Flag's bodyguard as depicted in Suicide Squad. She wields a sword that traps the souls of her victims, as Flag advises the Suicide Squad "not to be killed by her". She is also shown to be actively seeking vengeance for her husband's death. Fukuhara has stated that she wants to explore Katana's backstory in a future DCEU film.

=== Debuting in Wonder Woman ===
==== Etta Candy ====
Etta Candy (portrayed by Lucy Davis) is Steve Trevor's secretary in London. She helps Diana pick out a more appropriate outfit upon arriving in London, as the latter was only wearing her armor, also guarding Diana's weaponry until the appropriate time. The deleted scene/short film Etta's Mission, released as part of the Wonder Woman Blu-ray, depicts Etta's meeting up after the war with Charlie, Sameer, and Chief to discuss a top-secret mission to recover an artifact, implied to be a Mother Box. Etta and Diana later move to the United States and remain friends until the former's eventual death.

==== Menalippe ====
Menalippe (portrayed by Lisa Loven Kongsli) is a lieutenant for Themyscira's armed forces. Like Queen Hippolyta, Menalippe is embittered towards humanity. She helps her mentor General Antiope train Diana in combat and is greatly saddened when the former perishes in the battle with the German forces in Wonder Woman. By Justice League and its director's cut, Menalippe implicitly rises to Queen Hippolyta's right-hand woman.

=== Debuting in Justice League and Zack Snyder's Justice League ===
==== Ryan Choi ====
Ryan Choi (portrayed by Zheng Kai) is a scientist working at S.T.A.R. Labs under Silas Stone. Ryan introduces Silas to his laser heater capable of making its target the "hottest thing on Earth", hotter than the surface of the Sun. Following Silas' death, in which he uses the laser heater to superheat the last remaining Mother Box at the cost of his own life to help the Justice League, Ryan is promoted to the director of nanotechnology at S.T.A.R. Labs. His scenes were removed in the theatrical cut of the film but restored in the director's cut. Zack Snyder revealed that he had pitched a China-produced film centering on Ryan as Atom following the character's intended debut in the theatrical cut, as part of his original DCEU plans.

==== DeSaad ====
DeSaad (portrayed by Peter Guinness) is Darkseid's master torturer and also serves as a medium between him and Steppenwolf. He and Steppenwolf keep tabs on each other as the latter hunts for the Mother Boxes. DeSaad is scornful towards Steppenwolf for his attempted betrayal of their master, reminding him that he still has 50,000 worlds to conquer before he can regain Darkseid's favor, though he summons Darkseid himself after Steppenwolf reveals the discovery of the Anti-Life Equation on Earth. Following Steppenwolf's defeat and death, DeSaad laments to Darkseid that he had foreseen Steppenwolf's failure to unite the Mother Boxes and defeat the Justice League after Superman's resurrection. The character's scenes were removed from the theatrical cut of the film but restored in the director's cut.

==== James Gordon ====
Commissioner James Gordon (portrayed by J.K. Simmons) is the head of the Gotham City Police Department. He has a history of working with Batman, debunking a theory that the Caped Crusader was behind actions carried out by Parademons upon looking at police sketches in Zack Snyder's Justice League, and provides intel to the Justice League in both versions of the film. Simmons was expected to reprise the role of Gordon in a planned Batgirl film before the film's release was unexpectedly cancelled during post-production.

==== Slade Wilson / Deathstroke ====
Slade Wilson / Deathstroke (portrayed by Joe Manganiello) is a mercenary who has had an acrimonious relationship with Batman. He appears in a post-credits scene at the end of the theatrical cut, as Lex Luthor entices him to create a "League of [their] own" after the Justice League forms and defeats Steppenwolf. The director's cut has a different version of this scene in the epilogue, as Deathstroke simply gets the identity of Batman when visiting Luthor. He also appears in Batman's second "Knightmare" vision, joining forces with him, Victor Stone, Barry Allen, Mera, and Joker as they prepare to fight an evil Superman in that world.

Deathstroke was originally slated to appear in numerous DCEU projects, including the original version of The Batman, which was to star and be directed by Ben Affleck. Since Affleck's departure from the project, however, Matt Reeves has taken his place as director and re-wrote the script, terminating the film's DCEU connections and thus Deathstroke's involvement as well. Other projects included a film centering on the character with Gareth Evans in talks to write and direct and Mangaiello reprising the role of Deathstroke. Warner Bros. greenlit the film after Evans impressed executives with his story pitch, which he described as dark and unforgiving, similar to Korean noir films. However, in October 2018, Evans stated that he is yet to be attached to the project contractually. By April 2020, Evans announced that the project had been delayed, and that he was no longer actively involved with its development. The filmmaker revealed that the story that was developed was to portray the character's origin. In December 2020, after reprising the role in the Snyder Cut, Manganiello stated that are ongoing projects involving the character being developed with Zack Snyder involved, noting that over the years, at least seven projects involving Deathstroke had been cancelled. Manganiello admitted to feeling frustrated by the number of cancelled projects surrounding his character.

=== Debuting in Aquaman ===
==== King Atlan ====
Atlan (portrayed by Julian Lewis Jones in Justice League, Graham McTavish in Aquaman, Vincent Regan in Aquaman and the Lost Kingdom) was the king of Atlantis prior to the nation's submergence, during the time of Darkseid's first invasion of Earth. He led his army to the shores to aid in the battle against Darkseid, and was one of the three people entrusted with the security of the Mother Boxes. Later, he went into exile and died when Atlantis sank into the ocean during a test with the Trident of Atlan. His skeleton held the trident ever since, which was guarded by the Karathen. Millennia later, Arthur Curry, Atlan's distant descendant, follows the leads left by him and obtains the trident, becoming the true King of Atlantis and accepting the name of Aquaman.

=== Debuting in Shazam! ===
==== Eugene Choi ====
Eugene Choi (portrayed by Ian Chen) is one of Billy's new foster siblings, enjoying non-fiction and video games and being tech-savvy. He helps Billy find his biological mother Marilyn with his computer skills. Ross Butler portrays Eugene's superhero form.

==== Pedro Peña ====
Pedro Peña (portrayed by Jovan Armand) is one of Billy's new foster siblings. He has a shy and sensitive personality. D. J. Cotrona plays Pedro's adult superhero form, who has superhuman strength.

==== Mister Mind ====
Mister Mind (voiced by David F. Sandberg) is a Venusian worm. After being captured by the Wizard and kept in a terrarium, he escaped when Thaddeus Sivana attacked the Wizard and freed the Seven Deadly Sins. After Sivana's defeat by Billy Batson, he later proposed an alliance to him in his jail cell, something that Sivana agreed to.

==== Victor and Rosa Vasquez ====
Victor (portrayed by Cooper Andrews) and Rosa Vasquez (portrayed by Marta Milans) are the foster parents of Billy and his new siblings. Having been orphans themselves, Victor and Rosa dedicate their lives to creating a good living environment their foster children. They are worried when Billy often wanders off or comes home late.

=== Debuting in Wonder Woman 1984 ===
==== Asteria ====
Asteria (portrayed by Lynda Carter) is a legendary Amazon warrior. According to the legend, Asteria was given a suit of armour made from all of the armour of her fellow Amazons, so as to be strong enough to singlehandedly hold off the forces of mankind, voluntarily staying behind to preoccupy the armies of Men, allowing the other Amazons to escape their enslavement and flee to Themyscira. Wonder Woman discovers this armour and later dons it when fighting against Cheetah. At the end of the film, it is revealed that Asteria is still alive and well, living amongst humanity and keeping a low profile.

=== Debuting in The Suicide Squad ===
==== Gunter Braun / Javelin ====
Gunter Braun (portrayed by Flula Borg), also known as the Javelin, is a former Olympic athlete who now uses his javelin as a weapon, and is recruited into the first squad. Harley Quinn finds his accent endearing. Braun is killed in the battle, but before dying, he entrusts his javelin to Harley.

==== Brian Durlin / Savant ====
Brian Durlin (portrayed by Michael Rooker), also known as Savant, is a grizzled war veteran imprisoned on charges of blackmail. He is part of the first Suicide Squad sent to Corto Maltese. He retrieves Weasel after the latter drowns, but runs away from the battle due to PTSD, leading Amanda Waller to execute him via his remote-controlled explosive for desertion.

==== Richard "Dick" Hertz / Blackguard ====
Richard "Dick" Hertz (portrayed by Pete Davidson), also known as Blackguard, is a cocky, easily manipulated mercenary who is recruited into a detachment of the Suicide Squad and sent to Corto Maltese. Prior to their arrival, he contacts Corto Maltese's armed forces and alerts them to the squad's arrival. Upon making landfall, Hertz immediately betrays his team, giving away their location in an attempt to win the military's favor, but is promptly shot and killed.

==== Mongal ====
Mongal (portrayed by Mayling Ng) is an extraterrestrial mass murderer recruited into the first squad. She brings down a Corto Maltese helicopter during the battle, but as the aircraft crashes, it takes out Captain Boomerang and burns Mongal alive upon trapping her in the wreckage.

==== Cory Pitzner / T.D.K. ====
Cory Pitzner (portrayed by Nathan Fillion), also known as The Detachable Kid or simply T.D.K., is a metahuman who can detach his arms from his body and control them telekinetically. He is recruited into the first squad, whose members mock his moniker until he demonstrates his abilities. T.D.K. is gunned down in the battle amidst the heavy gunfire, but director James Gunn later revealed the character survived the battle.

==== Weasel ====
Weasel (portrayed by Sean Gunn) is, literally, an anthropomorphic, human-sized weasel that James Gunn describes as "barely more than an animal". He was imprisoned for supposedly killing 27 children, but it is later shown in Creature Commandos that it was eight children, none of whom Weasel killed. He is recruited into the first squad, but drowns immediately during the amphibious invasion of Corto Maltese as he is unable to swim. The mid-credits scene of The Suicide Squad shows that Weasel survived after being brought to shore by Brian Durlin / Savant and escaped into the island. Gunn also states that the character's portrayal is based on Bill the Cat from the comic strip Bloom County, and according to CinemaBlend, Weasel's design in the film follows his reinvention in The New 52 as a literal human-animal hybrid rather than a man in a weasel suit. Robert Curran of CBR called the character "oddly endearing" due to his "shabby" but cartoonish design, non-speaking nature, and helpless personality, also noting several other personality differences when compared to Weasel's bloodthirsty comics counterpart.

==== Flo Crawley ====
Flo Crawley (portrayed by Tinashe Kajese-Bolden) is a former member of A.R.G.U.S. and the former coordinator of missions for Task Force X. She also acted as the personal aide to Amanda Waller. During the Mission in Corto Maltese, she betrayed Waller to help the squad detain Starro, for which she was subsequently arrested.

=== Debuting in Peacemaker ===
==== Det. Sophie Song ====
Sophie Song (portrayed by Annie Chang) is a detective of the Evergreen Police Department who investigates the death of Annie Sturphausen, mistakenly arresting Auggie Smith, until she discovers that he was framed and tries to prove that he is innocent. Then, she organizes an operation to arrest Peacemaker in his trailer, where she ends up dying being possessed by the Butterfly queen, Eek Stack Ik Ik, who uses her body as a host to take over the world.

==== Det. Larry Fitzgibbon ====
Larry "Fitz" Fitzgibbon (portrayed by Lochlyn Munro) is the partner detective of Sophie Song, accompanying her in the investigation of the death of Annie Sturphausen, the arrest of Auggie Smith and the investigation of the proof of his innocence and the arrest of Peacemaker. Later he is possessed by a Butterfly after Eek Stack Ik Ik, possessing Sophie Song, started a massacre in the Evergreen Police Department, where all the officers and inmates got taken over by the Butterflies.

==== Cap. Caspar Locke ====
Caspar Locke (portrayed by Christopher Heyerdahl) is a mercenary, associate of Clemson Murn, who is hired by him and Amanda Waller to masquerade as the new captain of the Evergreen Police Department to keep Auggie Smith in prison and undermine Sophie Song's investigation. Alongside Fitzgibbon and the rest of the Evergreen police he is taken over by the Butterflies to dominate the world.

==== Judomaster ====
Judomaster (portrayed by Nhut Le) is a master martial artist bodyguard and an enemy of the violent vigilante Peacemaker. A firm believer in the Butterflies' cause, he challenged the 11th Street Kids in their quest to stop the aliens. In the second season, he is known as Rip Jagger, working as an agent for A.R.G.U.S.

==== Keeya Adebayo ====
Keeya Adebayo (portrayed by Elizabeth Ludlow) is Leota Adebayo's wife. After Leota lost her job, they moved from Gotham City to Evergreen, so Leota could work for her mother, Amanda Waller on Project Butterlfy. Leota asks her to stay away to keep her protected from the danger that Project Butterfly represents. In the second season, she and Leota got divorced and she works on Jeeters Coffee.

=== Debuting in Black Adam ===
==== Hurut ====
Hurut (portrayed by Jalon Christian, Uli Latukefu in superhero form), also known as The Champion, is Teth-Adam's son in ancient Kahndaq, and like his parents and most Kahndaqis, is enslaved by the country's tyrannical king Akh-Ton. Hurut is a kind-hearted young boy who is unafraid to speak up against injustice; when he stands up for a fellow slave who is then murdered in cold blood, he is ordered to be executed. The Council of Wizards deem the boy worthy to be their champion and rescue him from the execution to bestow him with their powers. After several escapades in which he continues to stand up for the oppressed population and undermines Akh-Ton's regime with his abilities, the king orders Hurut's parents to be killed. While unable to save his mother Shiruta, Hurut is able to save his gravely wounded father by transferring his powers to him, but is killed by the king's men in his vulnerable state moments later.

The Kahndaqi populace erroneously believe Hurut and Teth-Adam to be one and the same, attributing Hurut's actions as champion to Teth-Adam with the true consequences of the latter's rampage hidden from the public. A colossal statue of "The Champion" is erected in Shiruta City, which Teth-Adam recognizes is of Hurut, not himself, upon being revived in the present day.

==== Al Pratt / Atom Smasher ====
Albert "Al" Pratt (portrayed by Henry Winkler) previously known as the Atom Smasher, is a retired hero and a former member of the Justice Society, who later became mentor of his nephew, Albert Rothstein.

=== Debuting in The Flash ===
==== Albert Desmond ====
Albert Desmond (portrayed by Rudy Mancuso) is an employee of the Central City Police Department who works with Barry Allen and Patty Spivot.

==== Patty Spivot ====
Patty Spivot (portrayed by Saoirse-Monica Jackson) is an employee of the Central City Police Department who works with Barry Allen and Albert Desmond.

=== Debuting in Blue Beetle ===
==== Reyes family ====
Jaime Reyes' family play an important role in his life. His parents are Alberto and Rocio Reyes (portrayed by Damián Alcázar and Elpidia Carrillo respectively), His younger sister is Milagros (portrayed by Belissa Escobedo). Alberto's mother and Jaime's grandmother is Nana (portrayed by Adriana Barraza), and Jamie's Uncle and Alberto's brother is Rudy (portrayed by George Lopez).

In Palmera City, the Reyes family receive Jaime at the airport because he has graduated from college, and that the family will lose their home due to financial difficulties. The family watches Jaime in horror as the Beetle activates and merges with him, creating an armored suit. The family is later attacked by Victoria Kord's soldiers, who seeks Jaime with the Scarab to lure him and to be captured. After Alberto's death from a heart attack, the family is aided by Jenny Kord in helping them save Jaime and destroy Victoria's soldiers and stop their nefarious plans. The family returns to their burned home, where the neighbors provide support and Jenny now as the CEO of Kord Industries, she promises to repair all the damage done to the Reyes family, helping them rebuild their home.

=== Debuting in Aquaman and the Lost Kingdom ===
==== Karshon ====
Karshon (portrayed by Indya Moore) is an Atlantean and a member of the Council of Atlantis.

==== Kordax ====
Kordax (portrayed by Pilou Asbæk) is the king of Necrus and the former wielder of the Black Trident. He was the younger brother of King Atlan, and the indirect ancestor of Arthur Curry and Orm Marius.

== Major teams and organizations ==
=== Justice League ===
After the death of Clark Kent / Superman and inspired by his sacrifice, Bruce Wayne / Batman and Diana Prince / Wonder Woman decide to team up and recruit other metahumans to protect the Earth in Superman's absence, especially in the light of an extraterrestrial invasion from Apokolips. The team sees Barry Allen / Flash, Victor Stone / Cyborg, and Arthur Curry / Aquaman join amidst the conflict, all of whom had been secretly researched by Lex Luthor and government agents such as Amanda Waller. Superman himself joins the team after his resurrection. In the director's cut of Justice League (2021), Secretary of Defense Calvin Swanwick, revealed to be the Martian Manhunter, offers his help after the team defeats Steppenwolf.

The team is never officially referred to by name in the theatrical cut of Justice League (2017), though the director's cut shows their destroyed headquarters as seen in a "Knightmare" vision bearing the "Justice League" insignia. The events of Justice League are also referenced in Aquaman (2018) and Shazam! (2019), with Billy Batson and Freddy Freeman looking at newspaper articles covering the team's exploits.

The team returns in the Peacemaker season 1 finale (2022), with Superman, Wonder Woman, Aquaman, and the Flash arriving in hopes of helping stop the Butterfly threat, only for the titular character to reveal the threat was dealt with, while reprimanding them for arriving late. The team returns in The Flash (2023), with Flash, Batman and Wonder Woman stopping Alberto Falcone's robbery in Gotham City.

An alternate version of the team appears in The Flash (2023). Flash enters an alternate timeline and forms the Justice League with his younger counterpart Barry, Superman's cousin Kara and an older Batman to fight Zod's forces in a desert. Kara is killed by Zod and Batman dies after being unable to eject himself out of the Batwing which crashes into a Kryptonian ship. Flash and Barry attempt to go back in time to ensure both Kara and Batman live, but fail. Flash goes back once again and allows his mother's death to occur, thus preventing Zod's successful invasion and averting Kara and Batman's deaths.

=== A.R.G.U.S. ===
==== Task Force X / Suicide Squad ====
Task Force X is a covert U.S. government operation started by intelligence agent Amanda Waller. Its roster is composed of incarcerated metahumans and exceptionally skilled convicts who are sent on deadly missions, gaining the nickname the "Suicide Squad".

=== S.T.A.R. Labs ===
Scientific and Technological Advanced Research Laboratories, known simply as S.T.A.R. Labs, is a scientific research organization that appears in Batman v Superman and both versions of Justice League and is mentioned in The Suicide Squad.

=== Amazons ===
The Amazons are a race of immortal female warriors, created by Zeus to protect mankind. They are present during the first invasion of Earth by Apokolips, defending the world along with the Atlanteans, humans, Old Gods, and a Green Lantern. When Ares wages war against the other gods, he corrupts mankind into attacking and enslaving the Amazons, leading to Zeus creating the hidden island of Themyscira for them to hide with his dying breath. They have been training for battle against Ares on the island ever since, and were undisturbed until Steve Trevor accidentally finds Themyscira during World War I, prompting Diana, the daughter of Queen Hippolyta and unknown at the time, Zeus, to enter Man's world and protect it as Wonder Woman.

As depicted in the films, the Amazons display other talents aside from their prowess as warriors, such as the ability to quickly learn and adapt and understand all human languages, including extinct languages. They also appear diverse, resembling different human races and ethnic groups. Several stunt-doubles and athletes were cast to fill the roles of the Amazons in the films.

=== Atlanteans ===
The Atlanteans are a race of humanoid underwater dwellers from Atlantis, which was once an island nation. As explained in Aquaman, Atlantis sank to the bottom of the ocean due to excessive scientific experimentation, but its inhabitants were able to adapt to breathing underwater.

=== Kryptonians ===
Kryptonians are the inhabitants of the planet Krypton. They are largely a genetically engineered race by the events of Man of Steel with mechanically birthed individuals receiving pre-determined roles in society. In their early days, some 100,000 years before the present, Kryptonians had explored and settled other planets before birth control and restricting new laws forced them to abandon their space colonies. Jor-El, the chief Kryptonian scientist, and Zod, the chief military general, both realize the errors of Kryptonian society, despite having different ideologies, and most Kryptonians perish when Krypton explodes due to overmining of its core.

=== Shazamily ===
Composed of Billy Batson and his foster siblings, this group is formed after Billy shares his superpowers with them, allowing them to defeat Dr. Sivana. Afterwards, they find a new meeting place at the Rock of Eternity, growing closer as foster siblings as they fight crime. This team is not officially referred to by name in Shazam!, but gains the nickname the "Shazamily" by the events of Shazam! Fury of the Gods.

=== Birds of Prey ===
After Harley Quinn helps them defeat Roman Sionis, Huntress, Black Canary, and ex-Gotham City Police Department officer Renee Montoya, who joins them after being disillusioned with the GCPD, create an all-female vigilante group called the Birds of Prey.

=== Intergang ===
Intergang is a crime syndicate. Its Kahndaq faction was first seen in Black Adam where it is led by Ishmael Gregor. Intergang took control of the country at some point and have been searching for the Crown of Sabbac. When Teth-Adam was awoken, he became an obstacle for Intergang. Most of its members were either killed by Teth-Adam or detained by the Justice Society of America offscreen.

== See also ==
- List of DC Extended Universe cast members
