= Barry Allen (DC Extended Universe) =

DC Extended Universe character

Barry Allen The Flash
- DC Extended Universe character
- Promotional image of Ezra Miller as Barry Allen / Flash in Justice League (2017)
- First appearance: Batman v Superman: Dawn of Justice (2016)
- Last appearance: The Flash (2023)
- Based on: Barry Allen by: Robert Kanigher; Carmine Infantino
- Adapted by: Chris Terrio; Zack Snyder
- Portrayed by: Ezra Miller; Ian Loh (young); Max Greenfield (audio)

In-universe information
- Full name: Bartholomew Henry Allen
- Aliases: The Flash; Red Streak
- Nickname: Barry
- Species: Metahuman
- Gender: Male
- Occupation: Vigilante; College student; Police intern
- Affiliation: Justice League; Insurgency (Knightmare reality)
- Family: Henry Allen (father); Nora Allen (mother)
- Nationality: American
- Abilities: Genius-level intellect; Molecular intangibility; Electricity and lightning manipulation

Bartholomew Henry "Barry" Allen, also known as The Flash, is a fictional character in the DC Extended Universe (DCEU). Based on the DC Comics superhero of the same name, he is portrayed by American actor Ezra Miller. Originally appearing in a minor role in Batman v Superman: Dawn of Justice and Suicide Squad, Barry had a prominent role in the film Justice League, its director's cut, and in his titular film. Miller also reprised the role in cameo capacity in other DC Comics media such as the Arrowverse event series Crisis on Infinite Earths and in the HBO Max series Peacemaker. The DCEU marks the first time The Flash has been portrayed in live-action film.

== Development and portrayal ==
=== Early film proposals and casting for the DCEU ===
Development on a film based on The Flash started in the late 1980s when Warner Bros. hired comic book writer Jeph Loeb to write a screenplay, but nothing materialized from that. The project went dormant until it was brought up again following the release of Batman Begins, when writer David S. Goyer was offered a chance to write a script for either Flash or Green Lantern. In December 2004, Goyer was brought to write, produce and direct The Flash. He approached his Blade: Trinity co-star Ryan Reynolds for the Barry Allen role, with the intention of also using Wally West as a supporting character. Goyer soon dropped out due to creative differences, but a film based on the Justice League featuring Barry Allen soon entered development afterwards, with Shawn Levy set to direct and Adam Brody cast as Barry Allen. However, this film also fell through.

On June 9, 2010, Green Lantern writers Greg Berlanti (who would later create the 2014 TV series based on the Flash), Michael Green and Marc Guggenheim were hired to pen a treatment of the Flash film. The Flash script was to be based on the recent run by DC's Chief Creative Officer Geoff Johns. Mazeau told Blastr.com that the studio was still actively developing the big screen take on the DC Comics' character and that the project was still active. On July 20, 2013, The Hollywood Reporter has reported that the film was rumored to be released in 2016 but it has not been announced. In October 2014, Warner Bros. announced The Flash would be released in 2018 as the sixth installment of the DC Extended Universe. Ezra Miller was cast to play the title role of Barry Allen. The Flash was later postponed to 2022, with Miller providing assistance to re-writing the script following creative differences with original directors/screenwriters John Francis Daley and Jonathan Goldstein. It was later revealed in July 2019, that Andy Muschietti would officially be directing the film, with Christina Hodson serving as the screenwriter. In June 2020, TheWrap reported that Michael Keaton was in early talks to reprise his role of Bruce Wayne / Batman from Tim Burton's Batman (1989) and Batman Returns (1992). In August 2020, it officially confirmed that Keaton had signed on and that Ben Affleck would be reprising his role of Bruce Wayne / Batman from the DC Extended Universe. Filming began on April 19, 2021, at Warner Bros. Studios, Leavesden in Hertfordshire, England.

Once Zack Snyder received approval from WarnerMedia to film additional footage for his director's cut of Justice League in 2020, Miller, who at the time was filming for Fantastic Beasts: The Secrets of Dumbledore (2022) in London, was able to film their scenes as Barry Allen / Flash remotely, as Snyder directed the additional scene with Miller over Zoom. Snyder's video feed played through a stand on a table enabling him to direct Miller and the crew, who filmed the scene on his behalf.

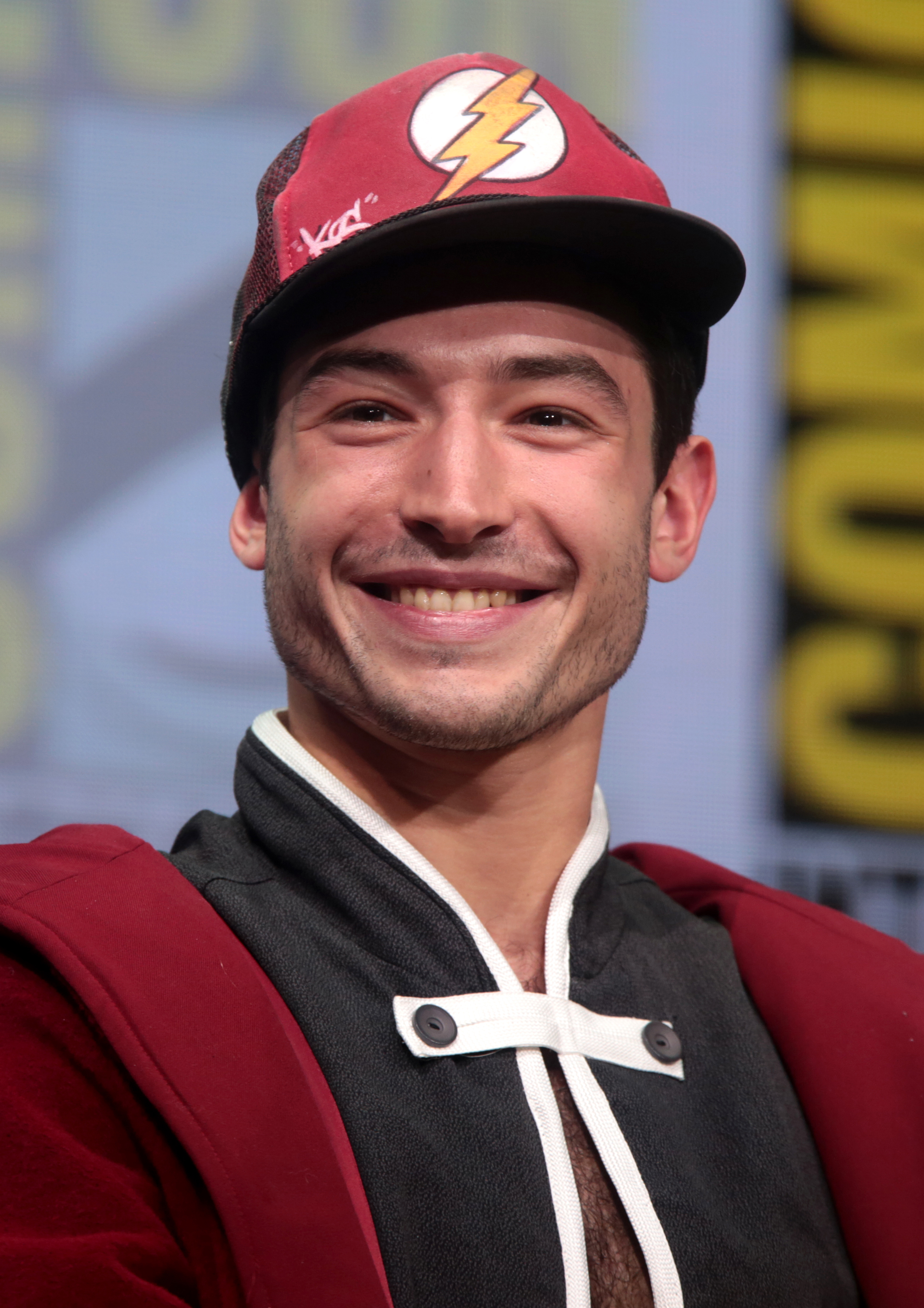
Ezra Miller is the first actor to portray Barry Allen / Flash on the silver screen.

=== Characterization ===
As portrayed in the films, Barry Allen is a remarkably intelligent and determined individual, studying to be a forensic scientist to prove the innocence of his imprisoned father Henry Allen in the death of his mother, Nora Allen. As the Flash, Barry is determined to keep his secret identity a secret from others, demonstrated by the many excuses he came up with when confronted by Bruce Wayne, despite none of them being convincing enough to fool the latter. When finally exposed by Bruce, Barry is quick to agree to join the Justice League, due to his great desire to gain friends he could relate to. He deals with insecurity and a tragic past much like the other superheroes in the DCEU, but retains a humorous, talkative personality and positive attitude. Ezra Miller has described their portrayal of the character as "an exploration of a multi-dimensional human being" while exploring the character's consideration as a superhero and a person to "feel the humanity of someone who is heroic — or the heroism of someone who is a flawed, deeply human person." In addition, Barry is implied to be a fan of Rick and Morty and has an extremely fast metabolism due to his superhero activities.

Barry casually describes himself as an "attractive Jewish boy" when first meeting Bruce Wayne in Justice League, just as Ezra Miller is Jewish in real life. This makes the DCEU Flash the first version of the character to be Jewish, and the first confirmed Jewish superhero to appear in film. Prior to this, Ian McKellen and Michael Fassbender's Magneto, as portrayed in the X-Men film series, is shown to be Jewish, but is more often than not depicted as a supervillain.

=== Running style ===
Barry Allen / The Flash's running motion, as seen in the "Speed Force" scene from Zack Snyder's Justice League.

Critics and fans have noticed Barry Allen's unorthodox running motion in both versions of Justice League. In an interview before the release of the theatrical cut, Ezra Miller shared that they had practiced martial arts for two years in preparation for the role, even venturing to the Wudang Mountains in China to study Qinggong. The monks they encountered inspired some of Barry's more meditative movements as well as his running motion while entering the Speed Force to reverse time during the climax of the "Snyder Cut". Miller also looked to the mechanics of speed skaters, dancers and choreographers as well as certain animals, stating "I was also inspired by crows, cheetahs, mongooses and other fast-moving and intelligent creatures, as well as by rushing water and, of course, lightning."

== Fictional character biography ==
=== Origins ===
Barry Allen was born on March 19, 1995, to Henry and Nora Allen. On June 13, 2004, when Barry was nine years old, Nora Allen was murdered by the Reverse Flash and Henry Allen was sentenced to life in prison for her murder. Barry always claimed that his father was innocent, but no one ever took him seriously. Barry started studying forensic science in the hopes of one day proving his father's innocence. On September 29, 2013, he gains superhuman speed after an accident, becoming a metahuman. During Zod's invasion of Earth, Barry travels to Metropolis to try and help. He saves a young boy, but is unable to save the boy's father. During Barry's early days as a superhero, he apprehends Captain Boomerang. Around 2015, security footage of Barry apprehending a burglar with his superpowers is decrypted and examined by Wayne after being stolen from Lex Luthor's servers. Wayne sends the footage to Diana Prince.

In 2017, Barry meets Iris West, saving her from injury during a car crash while he also interviews for a job. He later visits his father Henry, who is imprisoned after being wrongly accused of murdering his wife and Barry's mother, Nora. Henry encourages Barry to "move on with his life" during this particular visit despite Barry's protests.

=== Stopping Steppenwolf ===
==== Theatrical cut ====
Wayne recruits Barry to join a team of metahumans in the wake of Clark Kent / Superman's death, which Barry enthusiastically accepts upon learning that Wayne is Batman. Barry ventures with Wayne to meet with Prince in Gotham City, where they also encounter police commissioner James Gordon and fellow metahuman Victor Stone, also known as "Cyborg".

As the team prepares to fight Steppenwolf and his parademon minions under Delaware Bay to retrieve a Mother Box, Barry is intimidated upon seeing a parademon slaughter one of the scientists guarding the relic, stating that he has "no combat skills". Wayne tells him to focus on saving one person, in order to boost his confidence, after which he manages to save Stone's father Silas and many other civilians, in addition to aiding Prince by retrieving her sword and protecting her from a falling column. The team is aided by Arthur Curry / Aquaman, who arrives to save them from a deluge of water after Steppenwolf escapes.

After Curry joins the team, Wayne decides to use the Mother Box to resurrect Superman after examining its abilities, with Barry siding with him. Curry and Stone are sent to exhume Clark Kent's body, bonding over discussing the situation and their abilities. Upon returning to the lab, Barry charges up the Mother Box, which successfully revives Kent, though he has lost his memories and is triggered to attack the group. Barry tries to ambush Kent with his speed, but Kent counters with his own quickness and brute force, knocking Barry aside. Wayne has his butler Alfred Pennyworth bring Kent's girlfriend, Lois Lane, which calms him down.

Barry helps the team deduce that Steppenwolf will be in a nuclear fallout zone in Russia to try and unite all three Mother Boxes and reshape the Earth, so the team travels to confront him. While Wayne makes himself a distraction to the demon, Barry and the rest of the team flank Stone as he tries to pull the Mother Boxes apart. Upon seeing that civilians are in danger, Wayne orders Barry to evacuate them, but Kent arrives, singlehandedly saving the whole village while Barry saves a single family and helping the team to defeat Steppenwolf. Following the battle, Barry enthusiastically remains part of the team, now named the Justice League, and obtains an entry-level job with the Central City police department to his father's approval. Barry later challenges Kent to a race for fun.

==== Director's cut ====
During the battle under Gotham Harbor, Barry is more confident in his abilities. Prior to Kent's resurrection, Barry mistakes Stone's "no" for "go", charging up the Mother Box, and he is also shown crashing into Curry as the amnesiac Kent dodges an attack from him. Stone is also the one who discovers that Steppenwolf's base is in Russia, not Barry. During the final battle, Barry is assigned to provide an extra spark to help Stone pull apart the Mother Boxes. He fails the first time around as he is shot by a parademon while charging up his speed, allowing the "Unity" time to form, which kills the team and begins destroying the Earth. However, after regaining his confidence and healing himself, he manages to enter the Speed Force, running faster than the speed of light to reverse time and save his teammates from annihilation. He assists Stone in separating the boxes, allowing the team to defeat and kill Steppenwolf.

Following the battle, Barry enthusiastically remains part of the team and obtains an entry-level job with the Central City police department to his father's approval.

=== Life as a superhero ===
In the intermittent years, Barry became one of the world's best known superheroes with his image and powers becoming ingrained into popular culture. (Note: As depicted in Shazam (2019) and Peacemaker (2021))

The vigilante Peacemaker claims to have met Barry, describing him as an "unbearable d-bag". In 2021, Barry, alongside Prince, Kent, and Curry, arrive to assist Peacemaker in fighting a group of parasitic aliens named The Butterflies, albeit too late, and are insulted by a frustrated and disdainful Peacemaker as a result.

Shortly after, Barry's prototype suit was destroyed following a skirmish with the supervillain Girder. Following a series of training sessions in order for Barry to reach his full potential, Bruce Wayne created a new suit for him using microcompression technology in order for it to be carried around in a ring. Barry later battles further rogues in metahuman Tar Pit and cyborg weapons dealer, the Top.

=== Multiversal crisis ===
In 2023, after helping Wayne and Prince stop a robbery orchestrated by Al Falcone's terrorist group, Barry revisits his childhood home, where he remembers his mother's murder and his father's wrongful imprisonment. His emotions get the better of him, and despite Wayne's warnings about time travel and its consequences, goes back in time and prevents Nora's death from happening.

On his way back to the present, another Speedster knocks him out of the Speed Force, and he ends up in an alternate 2013 where his mother is alive. He also encounters a younger version of himself, and realizes he has arrived on the day he got his powers. He takes his younger self to the Central City Police Department, where he forces 2013-Barry to be struck by lightning just as he had. This results in 2013-Barry gaining powers, but also results in Barry losing his. While attempting to train 2013-Barry, the two watch a broadcast from General Zod announcing his intentions to invade Earth.

Barry attempts to assemble the Justice League, but is unsuccessful as he is unable to locate Prince, Stone has not yet become Cyborg, and Curry was never born. The two travel to Wayne Manor in hopes of finding Batman, but instead find an older, retired Bruce Wayne. Barry tries to convince Bruce to help them find Superman. Bruce initially declines, but later agrees to help them.

The group locates a Kryptonian pod at a military black site in Siberia. When they arrive, they do not find Superman, but instead Kara Zor-El, who claims to be Kal-El's cousin. After returning to the Manor, Kara leaves to find Zod, and Bruce helps Barry recreate the accident that granted him his powers. The first attempt fails and nearly kills Barry, but a second attempt with Kara's aid succeeds.

The Barrys, Bruce, and Kara team up to fight Zod and his forces in a desert. During the battle, Zod kills Kara and harvests her blood, and Bruce dies after the Batwing crashes into a Kryptonian ship. The Barrys attempt to go back in time to save them, but are unsuccessful. Barry realizes that they will not be able to save them, but 2013-Barry keeps trying. He fails every time, causing the multiverse to collapse in on itself.

Eventually, the Speedster who originally knocked Barry out of the Speed Force returns and is revealed to be an older version of 2013-Barry, who still believes he can save his world from Zod and prevent the deaths of Bruce and Kara. He explains the causal loop paradox that led to his own creation, but grows angry when Barry reveals his own intention to reverse his actions by letting Nora die. The Speedster attempts to kill Barry, but instead impales 2013-Barry, who sacrifices himself and causes Dark Flash to be erased from existence.

Barry undoes his changes to the timeline and finally comes to terms with his mother's death. However, he makes a minor change in the past, which creates new evidence in the present day that proves his father's innocence. After returning to the present and helping to exonerate Henry, Barry meets with Wayne, who looks different as a result of the timeline change.

=== Catching up with Aquaman ===
Following his multiversal adventure, (Note: As depicted in The Flash) Barry, having met a different Bruce Wayne, met with a seemingly an unchanged Arthur Curry for drinks. As they left a bar and headed back to Barry's apartment, Arthur was drunk and Barry tells him about all the timeline changed but says Arthur is literally the same person. Arthur falls into a puddle and says he'll wait there until Barry comes back with more drinks.

== Alternate versions ==
=== Knightmare reality ===
In a dark potential future seen in visions by Bruce Wayne and Victor Stone, Darkseid has taken over the world after turning it into an apocalyptic wasteland and corrupted Superman into his second-in-command after killing Lois Lane. Flash, Batman, Cyborg, Mera, Deathstroke, and Joker are seen being hunted by the brainwashed Superman in one of these visions. Barry is shown to have travelled from this future reality back to 2015 to tell Wayne that Lane "is the key" and to "find the others" before disappearing, implying that he is trying to prevent Lane's death. (Note: As depicted in Batman v Superman: Dawn of Justice)

=== Earth Prime ===
At some point, Barry encountered another version of himself (played by Grant Gustin) in the Speed Force. The two Barrys have a brief exchange, discovering they are the same person from different universes, and that the second Barry has adopted the moniker of "The Flash". Oblivious to the crisis the Flash is facing, Barry fades out from the Speed Force. This encounter led to Barry's own eventual adoption of the superhero moniker "The Flash."

=== Flashpoint Reality ===
An 18-year-old Barry whose mother was never murdered and has yet to become The Flash. He meets his older counterpart on the day the latter gained his powers, and is taken to the Central City Police Department, where he is struck by lightning and granted the same powers as his older self. Allen teams up with his older counterpart, his reality's Batman, and Supergirl to stop the Kryptonian invasion led by General Zod. Supergirl and Batman both die during the battle, causing both Barrys to go back in time to try and save them. The older Barry realizes that they cannot save them, but Allen keeps going back and trying. The two meet Dark Flash in the Speed Force, who is an older version of the Flashpoint Allen. When Dark Flash tries to kill the older Barry, Allen sacrifices himself to erase Dark Flash from existence and save his older self.

=== Dark Flash ===
An older version of the Flashpoint Barry Allen who has spent decades obsessively trying to save his reality and acts as the main antagonist of the 2023 film. He knocked the main timeline's Barry Allen out of the Speed Force and caused him to create the Flashpoint timeline. When in the main timeline in which Barry tries to go back and allow his mother's death to occur, Dark Flash tries to kill him, though he impales his younger self instead, causing him to be erased from existence.

== In other media ==
=== Film ===
- In the DC Extended Universe film Shazam!, The Flash appears as a drawing in Freddy Freeman's scrapbook as well as various merchandise related to him. He also appears in the film's animated end credits sequence.
- Though he does not appear in the film, The Flash is featured on several posters, comics and merchandise in Black Adam.

=== Literature ===
- The Flash's apprehending of Captain Boomerang is mentioned within the novelization of Suicide Squad.
- A three issue comic book tie-in miniseries, The Flash: The Fastest Man Alive, was released between September 2022 to November 2022, serving as a prelude to the 2023 film. The comic depicted Barry developing his skills and public presence as a superhero, coming face-to-face with a variety of villains including Girder, Tar Pit and Top. It also featured returning DCEU characters such as Batman, who gives Barry his new suit, as well as introductions to Patty Spivot, Albert Desmond and David Singh.

=== Video games ===
- The Flash's costume from Justice League appears as a skin in Lego DC Super-Villains.
- The Flash as he appears in Justice League is featured in the mobile version of Injustice 2.

=== Audio ===
- Max Greenfield portrays the DC Extended Universe version of Barry Allen in the scripted podcast series The Flash: Escape The Midnight Circus. Set after the events of the film, Allen is once again trapped in an alternate universe after experimenting with time travel. Teaming up with adversary Captain Cold, Allen must compete in a televised fighting tournament The Midnight Circus.

== Reception ==
Miller's performance in the theatrical cut of Justice League was praised as one of the film's highlights, despite the overall mixed-to-negative reviews for the film as a whole. In particular, Steve Persall of the Tampa Bay Times noted that "Ezra Miller's hyper-fast Flash is another sort of amusing, his fanboy spirit speaking for the audience while the CGI lightning trailing him is one of the movie's defining effects. The Flash's expression upon realizing he isn't the fastest person in the world is priceless, setting up the first of two end credits sequences." However, certain aspects of the character, such as an awkward-looking running motion and "forced" jokes as part of Joss Whedon's rewrites of the film, including the infamous "brunch" line and Flash falling on Wonder Woman's chest during the Gotham Harbor battle, were criticized.

Despite his lone major film role and numerous cameos at the time, the DCEU version of Flash was praised as a better-written character than his counterpart in the Arrowverse by Erik Kain of Forbes. Writing shortly after the premiere of Justice League, Kain writes that Ezra Miller's rendition of the character, despite being socially-awkward and having far less character development than Grant Gustin's version, is more likeable as a "quirky genius superhero" and is not tied down by "bad soap opera writing, propensity to lie all the time, and episode upon episode of filler" like his television counterpart.

Ezra Miller's performance and characterization in Zack Snyder's Justice League was also well-received with critics praising Barry Allen's increased confidence and chemistry with other characters, reduced "cringe-worthy" one liners, and his more integral role in the final battle, as compared to the theatrical cut. Tom Jergensen from IGN wrote: "He remains the comic relief character and fills that role well, as he's still a green enough hero to freak out when entering the Batcave for the first time. Snyder doubles down on Flash in the finale, with spectacular use of the Speed Force that raises the bar for his eventual solo film." The "Speed Force" scene from this cut of the film was later voted by fans as the winner of the "Oscars Cheer Moment" at the 94th Academy Awards.

=== Casting controversy ===
After a series of grooming allegations and disorderly conduct arrests, Miller's participation in The Flash began to cause controversy with some fans campaigning that the role be recast. Reportedly, Grant Gustin trended often on the social media site Twitter as a replacement due to his work with the character in the television series. It was reported by Deadline, that although Miller would play the role in the solo film - Warner Bros. will not 'likely keep Miller in the Flash role in future DC films'. However, in 2023, James Gunn commented on Miller reprising the role in the DC Universe franchise has yet to have been decided and that a decision will be made after Miller's recovery from mental health issues. Eventually, it was confirmed by Variety in October 2023 that no cast members from Zack Snyder's run of DCEU films would reprise their respective roles in the DCU, including Miller as The Flash.

== See also ==
- Flash in other media
  - Barry Allen (Arrowverse)
- Characters of the DC Extended Universe
