= Superman (DC Extended Universe) =

DC Extended Universe character

- DC Extended Universe character
- Henry Cavill as Kal-El / Clark Kent in Man of Steel (2013)
- First appearance: Man of Steel (2013)
- Last appearance: The Flash (2023)
- Based on: Superman by: Jerry Siegel; Joe Shuster
- Adapted by: David S. Goyer; Christopher Nolan
- Portrayed by: Henry Cavill; Dylan Sprayberry (teen); Cooper Timberline (young)

In-universe information
- Aliases: Kal-El (birth); Clark Joseph Kent (adoptive)
- Species: Kryptonian
- Occupation: Investigative journalist; Vigilante
- Affiliation: House of El; Daily Planet; Justice League
- Family: Jor-El (biological father); Lara Lor-Van (biological mother); Jonathan and Martha Kent (adoptive parents); Kara Zor-El (biological cousin)
- Significant other: Lois Lane (fiancée)
- Origin: Smallville, Kansas, United States
- Nationality: American
- Abilities: Superhuman; Strength, Stamina, Endurance, Speed, Agility, Reflexes, Intelligence, Longevity, Hearing; Enhanced Vision; EM Spectrum Vision, Infra-red Vision, Microscopic Vision, Telescopic Vision, X-ray Vision; Flight; Invulnerability; Heat Vision; Freeze and Wind Breath; Healing Factor; Solar Energy Absorption

Kal-El, also known by his adoptive Earth name Clark Joseph Kent, and best known by his superhero persona Superman, is a superhero in the DC Extended Universe (DCEU) series of films, based on the DC Comics character of the same name created by Jerry Siegel and Joe Shuster. In the films, he is a survivor from the destroyed planet Krypton who lands on Earth and develops superhuman abilities due to environmental differences between the planets and their respective star systems.

A destructive conflict with a faction of militant surviving Kryptonians led by General Zod results in extensive damage to Metropolis, creates a moral divide amongst humanity, and draws the attention of Bruce Wayne / Batman, who would confront Kent for his actions. The two would eventually reconcile their differences to prevent Doomsday, with the latter giving his life to kill the creature with the assistance of Wayne. Kent eventually gets resurrected and allies himself with the Justice League to prevent the Unity of the three Mother Boxes and prevent the conquest of Earth under Darkseid. Now a well known, and the most powerful, protector of Earth, Kent intervened on the behalf of Amanda Waller to confront the newly awakened Black Adam, negotiating his surrender.

First appearing as the protagonist of the film Man of Steel (2013), the character is portrayed by Henry Cavill, who is the first non-American actor to portray Superman in film. Cavill ultimately remained tied to this role for the next years following his first portrayal, until his final cameo appearance in The Flash (in 2023). (Note: The actor’s likeness was digitally recreated for a cameo appearance in The Flash using CGI. Cavill filmed additional scenes as the character for the film, but they were removed during post-production.) This version of Superman was one of the central characters of the DC Extended Universe, appearing in Batman v Superman: Dawn of Justice (2016), Justice League (2017) (and its 2021 director's cut), and an uncredited cameo appearance in Black Adam (2022). Body doubles for the actor made appearances in the film Shazam! (2019) and Brad Abramenko was in the first season of the television series Peacemaker (2022–present). Cavill was slated to reprise the character in future projects as of November 2022, including a planned sequel to Man of Steel and a larger role in The Flash, prior to James Gunn and Peter Safran becoming the new heads of DC Studios and beginning development on the DC Universe (DCU) media franchise. Cavill would be succeeded in the role by David Corenswet, beginning with the DCU film Superman (2025).

Director Zack Snyder's films in the DCEU have aimed to portray Superman in a more flawed and human light as compared to the previous film series by Warner Bros., which has received polarized reviews from critics.

== Fictional character biography ==
=== Arriving on Earth ===
Dylan Sprayberry as 13-year-old Clark Kent, as seen in Man of Steel

On February 29, 1980, Kal-El is the first Kryptonian born by natural means in many generations. His parents, Jor-El and Lara fight to save their planet Krypton from impending destruction due to the Kryptonians' reckless usage of the planet's resources. Jor-El becomes the first Kryptonian aware of the planet's impending destruction but his concerns are dismissed by the oblivious and irrational ruling council. Jor-El and Lara must also defend against a plot by General Zod to seize control of the planetary government. With no means to avoid the destruction of the planet, Jor-El and Lara infuse the DNA of their son with a codex containing the genetic information for future Kryptonian births, before sending him to Earth on a pre-programmed starship. They deduce that their son will develop great powers on Earth and will "become a god" to Earth-native humans. Kal is discovered by Jonathan and Martha Kent in Smallville, Kansas upon crash-landing on Earth and subsequently raised as their adoptive son, Clark Kent. As a child, Clark becomes isolated as a result of developing superhuman powers which he tries to hide from others, but one incident sees him single-handedly lift a school bus carrying his classmates from sinking into a river. He learns his true origins from Jonathan, who urges him to keep his powers hidden. In 1997, Jonathan dies in a tornado while refusing to let Clark rescue him, as that might reveal Clark to the world before he's ready. Burdened with guilt and looking for a new purpose in his life, Clark leaves to travel the world for several years under various aliases.

=== Becoming Superman ===
In 2013, Kent ventures to Canada, first getting a job as a bartender but later finding work with a drilling company that has discovered an object that turns out to be a Kryptonian scout ship. Kent enters the ship and activates its central computer using a key left by Jor-El, which allows him to communicate with an artificial intelligence modeled after his father. (Note: The scout ship takes on the functionalities of the Fortress of Solitude in the DCEU.) While following Kent, reporter Lois Lane from the Daily Planet inadvertently triggers the ship's security system. Kent uses his powers to rescue Lane, who is covering the event, before wearing the uniform and testing his flying abilities. Unable to convince supervisor Perry White to publish an article on the incident, Lane tracks down Kent back to his family home in Kansas, intent on finding the truth. She tries to persuade Kent to let her reveal his story, but decides to drop it after hearing of Jonathan's sacrifice, and keeps Kent's identity safe.

When Zod and his followers arrive on Earth and demand Kal-El be turned over, Kent seeks counsel from a local pastor on whether to trust humanity, having confessed that he is the one Zod is looking for and deduced that Zod will wage war regardless, with the pastor telling him to take a "leap of faith". Without revealing his identity and wearing the Kryptonian uniform, Kent meets with the United States Air Force and agrees to comply, with Lane joining him as a hostage. Using the Jor-El AI to take over the ship, Kent and Lane flee and warn the U.S. military of Zod's plan, resulting in an explosive confrontation between Kent and Zod's troops around Smallville, just as Zod orders an invasion. Zod deploys the World Engine from the Kryptonian ship, which touches down in the Indian Ocean and begins firing a beam through the planet towards the ship, severely damaging the city of Metropolis on the opposite side of the world, and initiating the terraforming strategy.

Kent destroys the World Engine while the military launches a suicide attack on the ship, sending Zod's troops back to the Phantom Zone. With the ship destroyed and Krypton's only hope of revival gone, Zod vows to destroy the Earth and its inhabitants out of revenge. The two Kryptonians engage in a lengthy battle across Metropolis, which concludes when Kent is forced to kill Zod as he attacks a cornered family in a train station. In the aftermath, Kent adopts a separate public identity with the military codename Superman and persuades General Calvin Swanwick to let him act independently, so long as he does not turn against humanity. To allow access to dangerous situations without attracting attention, he covertly maintains his civilian identity and takes a job as a freelance reporter for the Daily Planet.

=== Controversial figure ===
In 2015, Superman is now a controversial figure, being hailed as a hero by some, but denounced as a "false god" and dangerous by others, including Wayne Enterprises CEO Bruce Wayne. Kent is now in a relationship with Lane and has received a promotion at the Daily Planet, while as Superman, he has engaged in numerous acts such as engaging wildfires, floods, earthquakes, and other natural disasters, rescuing passengers on a train, halting a missile attack on the United States, and apprehending criminals.

Kent is assigned a sports story in Gotham City by White, but instead starts investigating on Batman. Kent is invited to a gala by Lex Luthor who requests that Kent be the reporter to cover the event. There, he meets Wayne, asking him about his opinion on Batman much to Wayne's annoyance, leading to an argument about the deeds of Superman compared with Batman's, before Luthor injects himself into the conversation to introduce himself. Wayne is at the gala to try and steal information from Luthor, and is also seeking kryptonite in an attempt to take on Superman. While watching television, Kent sees numerous personalities, including cosmologist Neil DeGrasse Tyson and U.S. Senator June Finch argue about Superman's effect on the world, with Tyson supporting Superman and Finch expressing skepticism. Following White's rebuff of Kent's attempts to investigate Batman and reports of misconduct by Batman from the Gotham Free Press, he decides to confront the caped crusader more directly as Superman, halting Batman's attempt to seize kryptonite from Luthor's men and leaving him a warning.

During a publicized congressional hearing at the U.S. Capitol on Superman's actions, Finch questions Superman for some of his alleged controversies, but a bomb planted there by Luthor explodes, killing everyone inside except for Superman. Superman blames himself for not detecting it in time and self-imposes exile. (Note: The Ultimate Edition of Batman v Superman: Dawn of Justice reveals the bomb was encased in lead, one of the few materials that can block Superman's X-ray vision.) Luthor lures Superman out of exile by kidnapping Lane and Martha Kent. He pushes Lane off the LexCorp building. Superman saves her and confronts Luthor, who reveals he manipulated him and Batman by fueling their distrust. Luthor demands he kill Batman in exchange for Martha's life. Superman tries to explain this to Batman, who instead attacks him and eventually subdues him using a kryptonite gas following a lengthy duel. As Batman prepares to move in for the kill using the spear, Superman pleads with him to "save Martha," causing Batman to pause in confusion.

Coming to his senses about how far he has fallen from grace after Lois arrives and explains Superman's words, Batman promises to rescue Martha. Superman regains his strength and confronts Luthor on the scout ship. Luthor executes his backup plan, unleashing Doomsday, a genetically engineered monster from Zod's DNA and his own. Diana Prince, an antiques dealer whom Bruce encountered at the gala earlier and was also revealed as a metahuman known as Wonder Woman, arrives with her metahuman powers on display, and joins forces with Batman and Superman against the creature. Though outmatched, Superman realizes its vulnerability to kryptonite and retrieves the spear. After bidding goodbye to Lois, he impales the creature with the spear, but in its dying moments, the creature kills Superman, who was weakened by kryptonite exposure. Superman is mourned by the world, and Clark is given a private funeral in Smallville attended by Lois, Martha, Bruce, Diana, and other close acquaintances.

=== Resurrection ===
==== Theatrical cut ====
Closeup of Clark/Superman in the theatrical cut of Justice League. The execution of Henry Cavill's digitally erased mustache in the cut has drawn ridicule.

In 2017, in wake of an invasion by the demonic New God Steppenwolf, Prince teams up with Wayne to create their own metahuman group, recruiting Barry Allen, Arthur Curry / Aquaman, and Victor Stone. However, the group still proves no match for Steppenwolf and his minions, and Wayne comes to the conclusion that they need to resurrect Superman if they truly wish to save the Earth. Kent's body is exhumed by Allen and Stone and placed in the amniotic fluid of the Kryptonian scout ship's genesis chamber, alongside a Mother Box that they had retrieved, as the device was used to save Stone's life after a horrific accident.

Allen uses his powers to charge it up and successfully resurrects Superman. However, Superman's memories have not returned, and he attacks the group after Cyborg accidentally launches a projectile at him. On the verge of being killed by Superman, Batman sends Lane to calm down Superman.

Without Superman to aid them, the five heroes travel to a village in Russia where Steppenwolf aims to unite the Mother Boxes once again to remake Earth for his nephew and superior Darkseid who is the ruler of the planet Apokolips. Superman arrives, remembering his promise to help Batman after Lane reminds him, and assists Allen in evacuating the city, as well as Stone, in separating the Mother Boxes. The team defeats Steppenwolf with Superman and Wonder Woman destroying his axe. Overcome with fear, Steppenwolf is attacked by his own Parademons before they all teleport back to Apokolips.

In the aftermath of the battle, Wayne re-acquires the Kent farm for Martha before it can be foreclosed and decides to rebuild Wayne Manor as a base of operations for the team and he and Prince agree that more heroes could join. Superman resumes his life as Kent and as protector of Earth, thanking Wayne and Prince for not losing hope in humanity, as Batman offers Superman the mantle of leadership for the newly minted Justice League. Later, Superman has a friendly race with Flash to see who is faster.

==== Director's cut ====
Superman's digitally colored black suit, as seen in Zack Snyder's Justice League

Superman's scream during his death awakens all three of the Mother Boxes, with the one under watch by the Amazons calling out to alien conqueror Steppenwolf. After Victor explains the nature of the Mother Boxes to the team, indicating that they are unbiased "change machines" and that the boxes did not call out to Steppenwolf until after Superman's death, the team unanimously votes to use the box to resurrect the Man of Steel.

Allen uses his powers to charge up the Box to resurrect Superman successfully. However, Superman's mind is under the influence of Apokolips, and he attacks the group after Cyborg's defense system forces him to launch a projectile. After disabling the group one by one, he corners Batman. On the verge of killing him, Superman only stops upon seeing Lois Lane, who arrived on her own after seeing his resurrection.

When Kent leaves with Lane to Smallville to regain his memories, they confirm their engagement after Kent sees her still wearing the ring given to her, and they also reunite with Martha. He voluntarily leaves to fight Steppenwolf, saying the team "brought him back for a reason". Superman picks out a black-colored version of his skinsuit from the scout ship and gets the Justice League's whereabouts from Bruce's butler Alfred Pennyworth, then intercepts a killing blow from Steppenwolf meant for Stone, proceeding to freeze the New God's axe and brutally overpower him, burning off his right horn with his heat vision.

Despite Superman's arrival, Stone cannot pull apart the Mother Boxes in time, leading to an explosion that begins destroying the Earth until Allen enters the speed force, reversing time. Superman then assists Stone in separating the boxes. Aquaman impales a distracted Steppenwolf from behind and Superman punches him into the boom tube, while Wonder Woman decapitates the airborne Steppenwolf before his body arrives at Darkseid's feet on Apokolips through the portal.

In the aftermath of the battle, Wayne re-acquires the Kent farm for Martha before it can be foreclosed. Superman resumes his life as Kent and as protector of Earth.

=== Later years ===
In 2018, Superman makes a visit to Freddy Freeman and Shazam at their school cafeteria, as a favor to Billy for Freddy. In 2021, Superman is shot with a kryptonite bullet by mercenary Robert DuBois / Bloodsport and placed in the ICU. However, he manages to survive, and DuBois is incarcerated before being recruited by Amanda Waller for Task Force X in exchange for a reduced prison sentence. In 2022, he and the Justice League, with the exception of Batman and Cyborg, are called by Waller to assist Christopher Smith / Peacemaker in facing the Butterfly army but arrive too late, missing the fight. Later that same year, Superman is once again called by Waller to confront the new leader of Kahndaq, Black Adam. Superman approaches Black Adam and says that the two of them need to talk. At some point in 2023, Superman is contacted by Alfred to assist Batman in stopping Alberto Falcone from causing havoc in Gotham. Superman, however, is unable to assist because he was busy combating a volcanic eruption in Guatemala. He also later appeared alongside the other members of the Justice League during the time travel Chronobowl sequence.

== Alternate versions ==
=== Steppenwolf victorious ===
Zack Snyder's Justice League depicts a moment when the Mother Boxes converge and the Justice League are too late to stop Steppenwolf from calling Darkseid and his army. Superman, alongside the rest of the Justice League, is killed at ground zero of the event. This version of events is erased when Barry Allen enters the Speed Force and reverses time.

=== Knightmare reality ===
Victor Stone and Bruce Wayne see premonitions of a "Knightmare" reality. Victor sees Darkseid's campaign of death upon returning to Earth, ultimately killing Lois Lane. This leaves a devastated Superman susceptible to the Anti-Life Equation, becoming Darkseid's second-in-command. One of Wayne's premonitions saw Superman leading a Regime allied with Parademons who capture Batman & members of his insurgency, leaving them to be tortured and killed by Superman himself. Wayne's other premonition shows Superman tracking down Batman, the Joker, Deathstroke, Mera, Victor Stone, and Barry Allen.

=== Flashpoint ===
In the reality Barry Allen creates after stopping his mother's murder, Superman's cousin Kara Zor-El landed on Earth in his place. Kidnapped and experimented on by Russian scientists, Kara was eventually rescued by The Flash, a younger 2013 version of Allen, and this Earth's version of Batman. Upon fighting General Zod, it is revealed that Kal-El's pod was intercepted by Zod and that he was killed whilst they attempted to extract the Codex. This is presumably undone when Allen restores the timeline, allowing Kal-El to exist and become Superman.

== Character concept and development ==
As one of the most prominent superheroes for DC Comics, Superman had previously been portrayed in film several times in film serials and most prominently in the 1978–1987 Superman film series, with Christopher Reeve taking on the role of Superman. While Reeve's performance was widely regarded as one of the greatest in film history, the series was placed in jeopardy following the critical and commercial failure of Superman IV: The Quest for Peace. Following Superman Returns, a 2006 homage sequel to the film series' first two films which saw Brandon Routh replace Reeve, talks commenced regarding using that film to create a shared universe for other DC characters, but they stalled out. With Routh's contract to portray Superman expiring in 2009, Warner Bros. decided to reboot the franchise, beginning to take pitches on ideas to restart the film series. One of the most prominent ideas that emerged was that of a Golden-Age inspired Superman "when he was a bit more of a regular person."

He basically told me, 'I have this thought about how you would approach Superman', I immediately got it, loved it and thought: That is a way of approaching the story I've never seen before that makes it incredibly exciting. I wanted to get Emma Thomas and I involved in shepherding the project right away and getting it to the studio and getting it going in an exciting way.

— Christopher Nolan, recalling the moment when Goyer presented the idea of a modernized Superman.

During the production of the Dark Knight trilogy of Batman films, which later saw tremendous success, producer David S. Goyer told director Christopher Nolan his idea regarding how to present Superman in a modern context. Impressed with Goyer's concept, Nolan pitched the idea to the studio, who hired Nolan to produce and Goyer to write based on the financial and critical success of The Dark Knight.

Nolan admired Bryan Singer's work on Superman Returns for its connection to Richard Donner's version, stating that "A lot of people have approached Superman in a lot of different ways. I only know the way that has worked for us that's what I know how to do," emphasizing the idea that Batman exists in a world where he is the only superhero and a similar approach to the Man of Steel would assure the integrity needed for the film. "Each serves to the internal logic of the story. They have nothing to do with each other." Nolan, however, clarified that the new film would not have any relationship with the previous film series. Filming of Man of Steel began in 2011 with a lawsuit stipulating that Warner Bros. would be able to be sued by the family of Superman creator Jerry Siegel for lost revenue on an unproduced film after that year, thanks to the Siegel estate recapturing 50% of the rights to Superman's origins and Siegel's share of the copyright in Action Comics #1, despite the studio not owing the Siegel estate money for previous films.

=== Casting ===
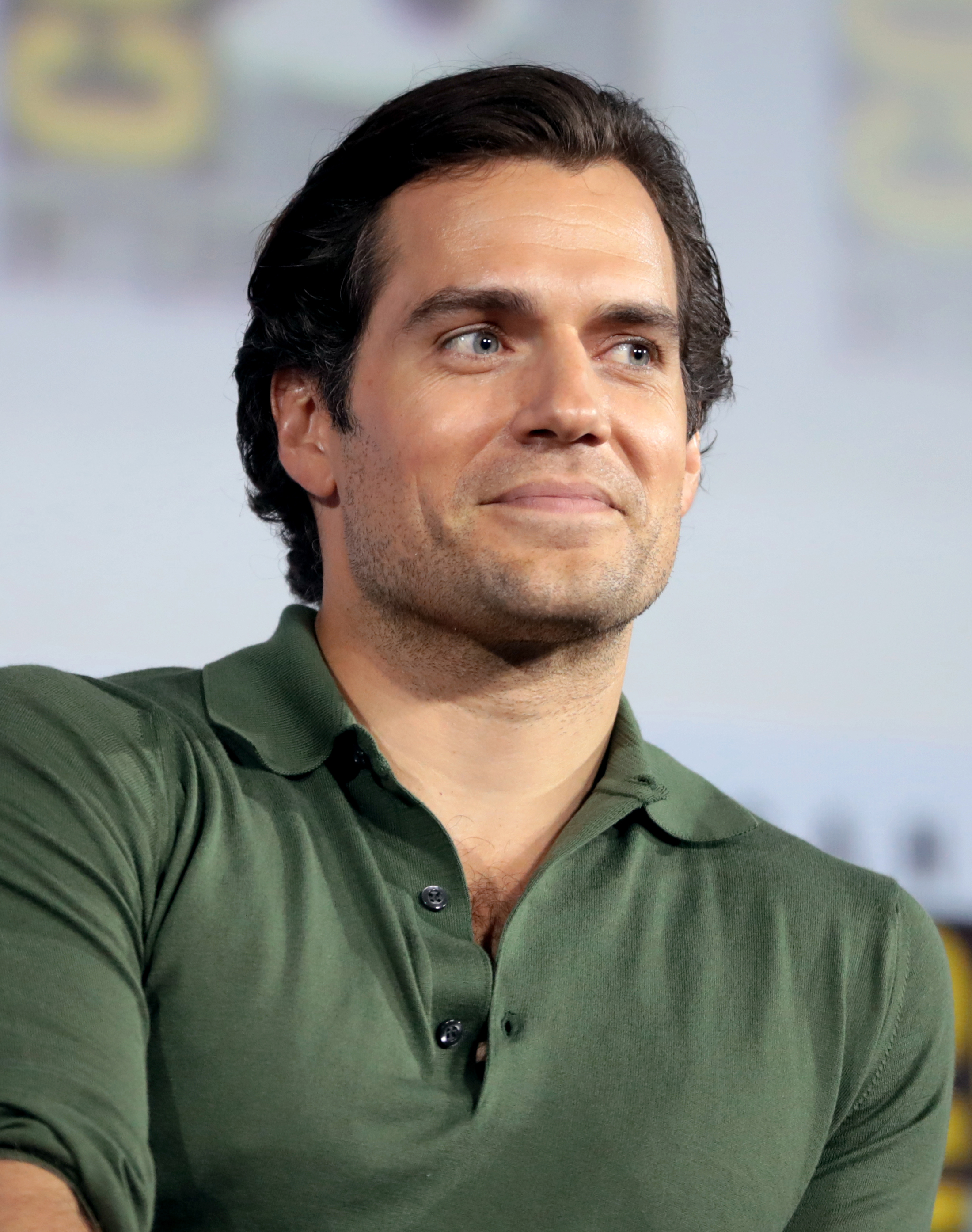
Henry Cavill is the first non-American actor to portray Superman in film

British actor Henry Cavill was cast as Clark Kent/Superman for Man of Steel. Cavill is the first non-American actor to play the character. He was previously cast in Superman: Flyby, which was ultimately shelved, and was considered for the role in Superman Returns, but lost to Routh. Cavill stated, "There's a very real story behind the Superman character." He explained that everyone's goal has been to explore the difficulties his character faces as a result of having multiple identities—including his birth name, Kal-El, and his alter ego, Clark Kent. Cavill also stated that, "He's alone and there's no one like him," referring to Superman's vulnerabilities. "That must be incredibly scary and lonely, not to know who you are or what you are, and trying to find out what makes sense. Where's your baseline? What do you draw from? Where do you draw a limit with the power you have? In itself, that's an incredible weakness." In an interview with Total Film magazine, Cavill stated he had been consuming nearly 5,000 calories a day, training for over two hours daily and plowing protein to pack on the muscle mass. Cooper Timberline was cast as the 9-year-old Clark Kent, and Dylan Sprayberry was cast as the 13-year-old Clark Kent.

During the reshoots of Justice League, Cavill had grown a mustache during lapses in the film's production due to his role in Mission: Impossible – Fallout, and was required by Paramount Pictures to keep the mustache. This conflicted with the reshoots of Justice League, so Cavill's mustache was digitally removed in that film.

While Superman has a cameo appearance in Shazam!, he is portrayed by Zachary Levi's stunt double Ryan Hadley due to Cavill being unavailable for filming at the time. At the time, it was unconfirmed whether Cavill would reprise the role again, though he stated in 2021 that he was still open to portraying the character, specifically that "There is still a lot of storytelling for me to do as a Superman, and I would absolutely love the opportunity." Superman was also seen controlling a crowd of fans who wanted to have their pictures taken with Aquaman and arm-wrestling with Shazam in the film's animated end credits sequence.

Superman made another cameo appearance in the season finale of the television series Peacemaker, portrayed by actor Brad Abramenko. Abramenko used the same suit Cavill used in the previous films. Later that year, Cavill returned to play the character, making an uncredited cameo appearance during the mid-credits scene of the film Black Adam. Speaking on the appearance of Cavill in the film, which was the first time he shot new material for the character in five years, lead star Dwayne Johnson commented that he, production company Seven Bucks Productions, and producers Dany & Hiram Garcia were instrumental in the re-negotiations between Warner Bros. and Cavill. Cavill later confirmed following the film's release that he was back as the character long-term, and that his appearance in Black Adam was "a very small taste of things to come". As part of those plans, the same month as filming his cameo for Black Adam in September 2022, Cavill also filmed a cameo for The Flash. Despite being given the go ahead to announce his return by the studio, Cavill had only actually negotiated a "one-off deal" with Warner Brothers Discovery. by September 2022. His contract only having covered his two previous cameos, he never actually signed a long term deal to return for the character and had only a verbal agreement with those temporarily in charge of DC films.

Potential for further appearances from the actor was diminished in November 2022 upon the newly christened DC Studios's change in leadership under new heads James Gunn and Peter Safran. By December, the former was in the process of writing a reboot film, Superman (2025), focusing on a younger version of the character that will be portrayed by David Corenswet, succeeding Cavill. The film is intended to launch the new DC Universe (DCU) media franchise and shared universe. The Flash was still released as the final slate of completed films set to come out in 2023, but Cavill's scenes were cut in post production with Gunn and Safran reworking the film in order to avoid promising anything that would conflict with their upcoming plans. However, Cavill still retained an uncredited cameo appearance in the film through a computer-generated imagery (CGI) model bearing his likeness. This marked his final appearance as Superman in DC media.

=== Suit design ===
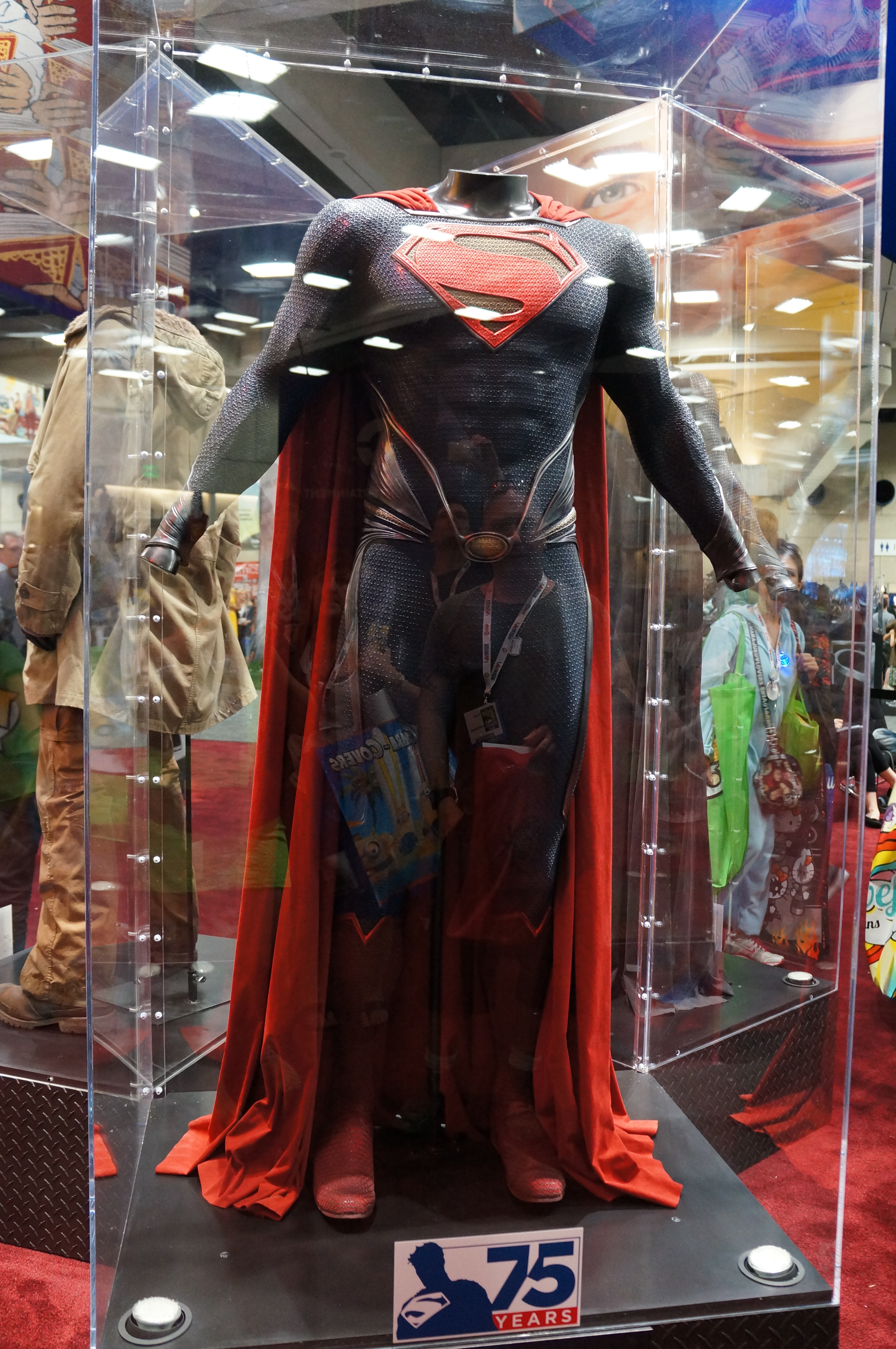
Superman's Man of Steel suit on display as part of the Superman 75th Anniversary Costume Tour at the 2013 San Diego Comic-Con

Superman's bodysuit in Man of Steel, in addition to that of other Kryptonians such as Jor-El and General Zod, was designed with a textured chain mail motif, which costume designer Michael Wilkinson intended to evoke the "Man of Steel" mantra and other-worldly theme and make Superman stand out from the people of Earth, a departure from previous fabric-based interpretations of the suit. Also notably missing are the red trunks, which Zack Snyder mentioned did not fit in with the world he was building in the film, though the cape was retained to keep Superman recognizable. This also mirrors Superman's redesign in The New 52.

For Batman v Superman: Dawn of Justice, Wilkinson and the costume team continued to streamline Superman's suit, adding new features. Specifically, the crest and biceps of the updated suit incorporate a quote from Joseph Campbell written in the Kryptonian language developed for the films: "Where we had thought to stand alone, we will be with all the world". Wilkinson notes that Snyder is an ardent admirer of Campbell's work, saying that Snyder "found a quote that seemed to really connect with Superman and his place in the world. It was a quote that has to do with the idea of alienation or coming together and feel[ing] a part of society. That's something that Superman is sort of battling all the time — feelings of alienation and connection. The quote deals with those issues."

For the theatrical release of Justice League, Snyder had originally planned for Superman to wear his black suit, as depicted in the comics storyline The Death of Superman, prior to stepping down, but was overruled by Warner Bros. executives. In the 2021 director's cut of the film, which features Snyder's original footage prior to reshoots in addition to extra footage shot in 2020, Superman's suit has been digitally recolored in scenes that depict him in the black suit.

=== Themes and characterization ===
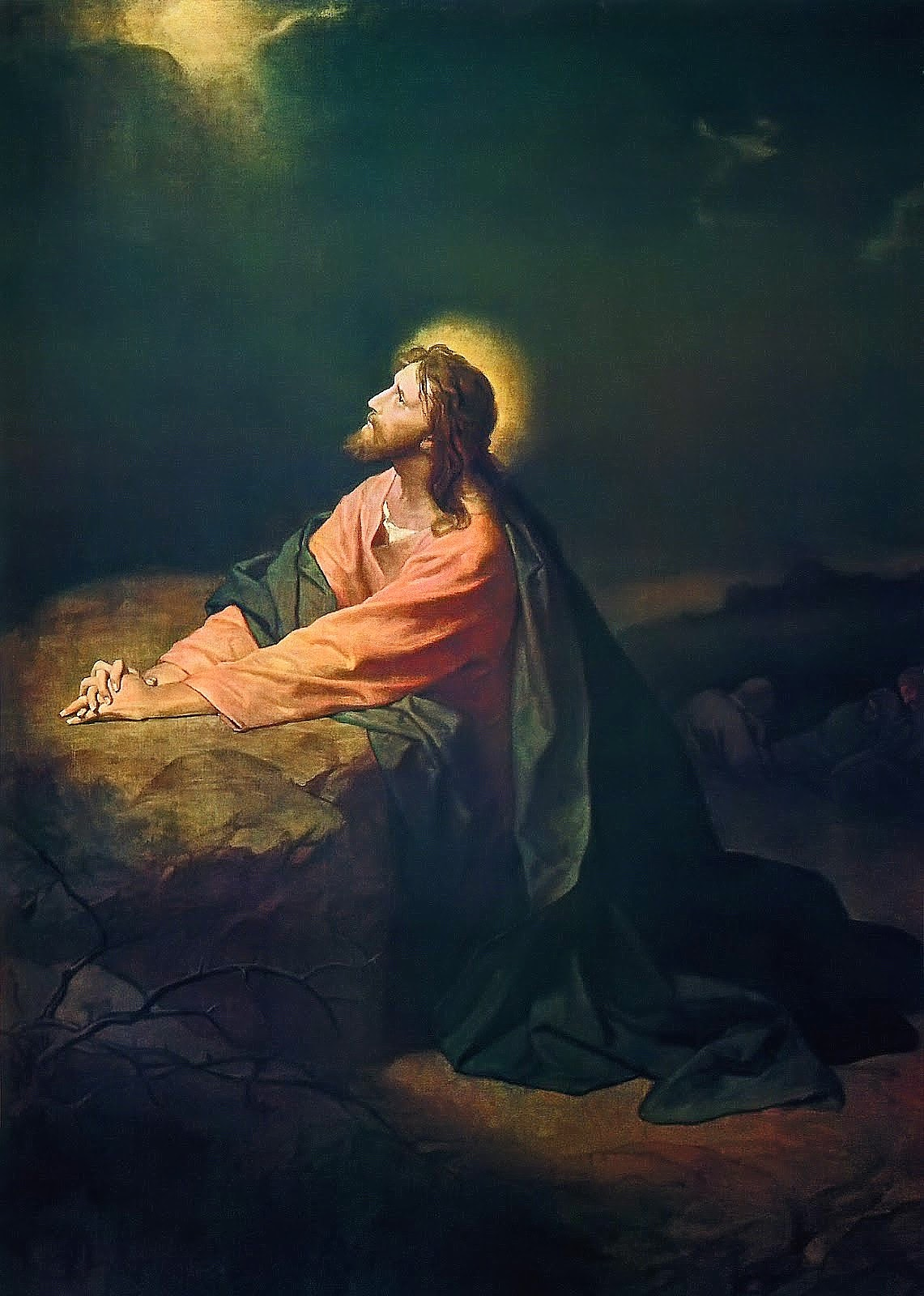
Critics have compared Clark's struggle to that of Jesus' prior to his crucifixion. A glass mosaic of Jesus at Gethsemane, similar to this one, appears in the background when Clark visits a church in Man of Steel.

Like Christopher Reeve's portrayal of the character, the DCEU version of Superman has seen several allusions to Jesus. Many reviewers interpreted Man of Steel as a religious allegory, especially since Warner Bros. set up a website www.manofsteelresources.com that contains "a nine-page pamphlet entitled Jesus – The Original Superhero". Justin Craig of Fox News points out several allegories in Man of Steel to Christ, which include Clark's age of 33 in the film, which was the age of Jesus during his crucifixion, being shackled prior to interrogation similar to Jesus's arrest, and Clark's Earthly father Jonathan being a tradesman similar to Jesus's Earthly father Joseph. Craig also compares Kal-El's struggle to the passion of Christ, stating that "Kal-El is more than willing to sacrifice himself to save the people of Earth. Originally reluctant to reveal his identity and powers to the world, Clark decides to turn himself over to Zod to save humanity from annihilation." Craig further states there is an allegory to the Trinity within Man of Steel: "Jor-El returns to Kal-El on Earth as a ghost, guiding his budding superhero son on his path to salvation. Before Jor-El sends his son off to Earth baby Moses-style, he tells his wife that, like Jesus, 'He'll be a god to them.'" Time magazine's Richard Corliss also provided other allegories, such as comparing Clark's rescue of his classmates at age 12 to Jesus being in the temple at the same age as flashes of their potential, being sent to Earth by a "heavenly father", Jor-El, and Clark visiting a church while contemplating surrendering himself to General Zod to protect mankind, with a mural of Jesus during his final days in the background.

However, Clark struggles with his identity in the DCEU despite being treated as a god by Earth's citizens. Corliss compares Clark in Man of Steel to Jesus as portrayed in The Last Temptation of Christ in that both figures doubt their divinity in their respective films. In addition, film critic Matt Zoller Seitz notes that Cavill and Sprayberry portray a Clark Kent/Superman riddled with conflict on how to display his powers without being labeled a "freak" and dealing with the aftermath of traumatic events from his life, but is forced out of his comfort zone with the arrival of General Zod on Earth. Zoller Seitz also comments that Cavill does not showcase Superman's signature confidence as Christopher Reeve did due to the character's internal conflict in the film. By the time of Batman v. Superman, Clark has settled into his role as a superhero, with Cavill adding "He's more used to this gig, doing his best to save as many lives as he can", further explaining, "He is no longer frantic. He's no longer a wet-behind-the-ears kind of superhero." On the contrary, Superman is forced to deal with heavy criticism of some of his prior actions. He also disagrees with Batman's form of justice in the film, leading to conflict between the two vigilantes.

Despite Superman being described as "joyless" in the first two films of the DCEU, director Zack Snyder mentioned that in his original vision for the character's arc, that Clark would become the "true Superman" by the end of Justice League. Snyder enjoyed working with the idea of Superman grappling with his morality, relationship with Lois Lane, and his place on Earth, in that it would make the character more relatable to mankind, and that Superman would have to "earn" his spot at the "pinnacle of the DC superhero world." However, numerous scenes that would have fleshed out the character's arc in the film's theatrical release were cut out once Joss Whedon took over for Snyder. These deleted scenes were restored in Zack Snyder's Justice League, a director's cut of the film.

== In other media ==
=== Video games ===
- The Man of Steel depiction of Superman is featured as a skin in the 2013 video game Injustice: Gods Among Us.
- Clark's Justice League costume is able to be downloaded as a skin in the 2018 video game Lego DC Super-Villains.
- Superman appears alongside the rest of the Justice League in the virtual reality video game Justice League VR: The Complete Experience.
- The DC Extended Universe version of Superman is a playable character in the mobile game version of Injustice 2. The chest emblem is also an unlockable costume addition.

=== Literature ===
- Superman appears and is mentioned in the novelizations of the films set within the DC Extended Universe.
- Superman makes a cameo appearance at the end of the Man of Steel prequel comic written to tie in to the film. The comic delves more into the history of Krypton and his distant ancestor and cousin Kara Zor-El.

=== Jimmy Kimmel Live! ===
- Cavill, along with Ben Affleck and Jesse Eisenberg, reprised their roles in a comedic "deleted scene" of Batman v Superman: Dawn of Justice featuring Affleck's longtime friend Jimmy Kimmel and shown on Jimmy Kimmel Live!. In the skit, Kimmel's character successfully deduces the superhero identities of both Clark Kent and Bruce Wayne at Lex Luthor's gala, resulting in Clark Kent throwing Kimmel's character to Mars in annoyance, where he encounters Matt Damon's character from The Martian.

== Reception ==
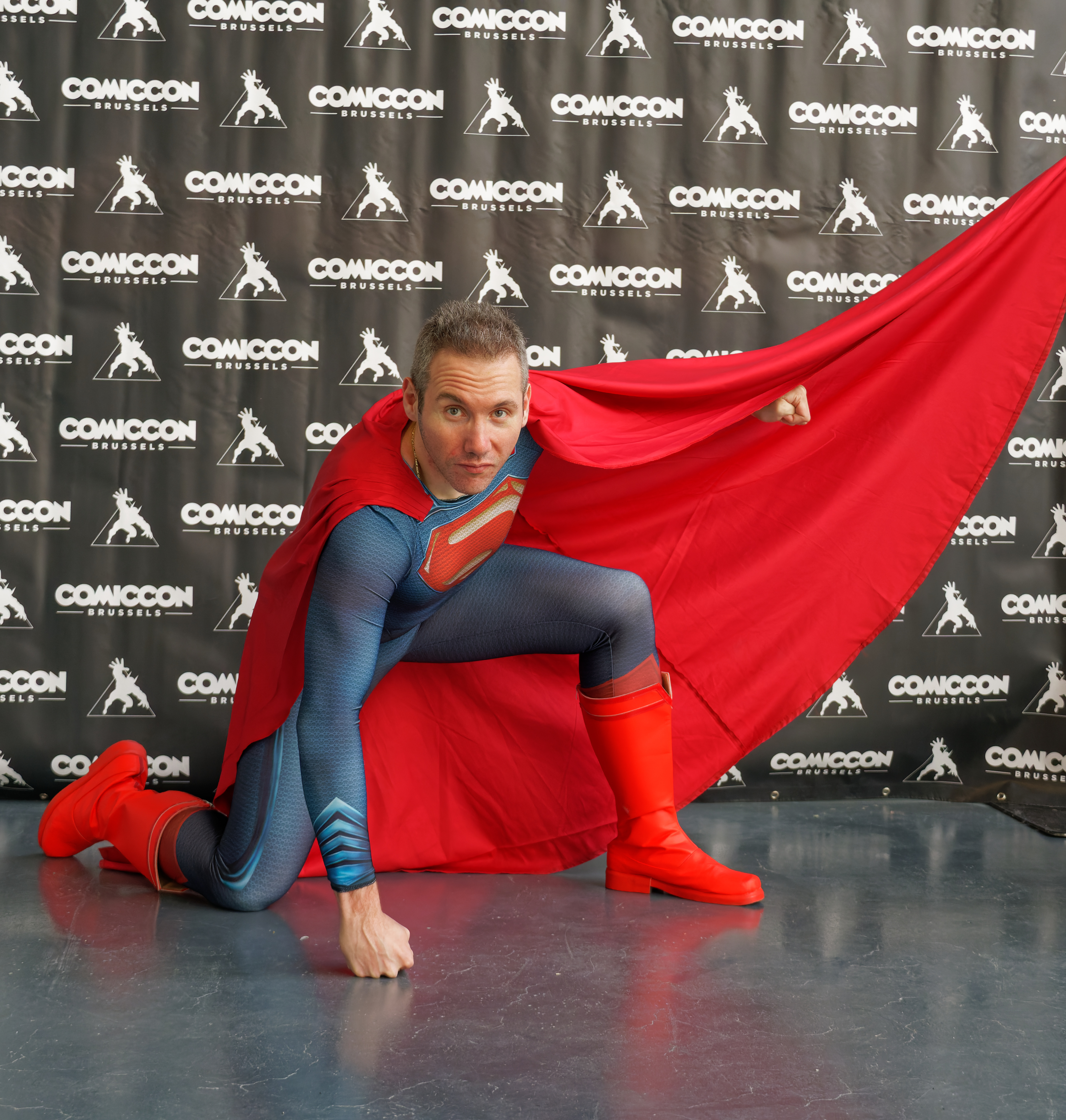
Cosplayer dressed as Henry Cavill's Superman at the Brussels Comic Con 2022

Cavill's performance as Superman has received polarized reviews from critics. While Cavill's portrayal of Clark Kent's inner turmoil and chemistry with co-star Amy Adams was praised, other critics commented on perceived stiffness and a lack of charisma in Man of Steel. These critical assessments proved to carry over to the film's sequel Batman v Superman: Dawn of Justice. In a positive review of the film, Richard Corliss wrote, "The movie finds its true, lofty footing not when it displays Kal-El's extraordinary powers, but when it dramatizes Clark Kent's roiling humanity. The super part of Man of Steel is just okay, but the man part is super."

Particularly criticized was Superman's decision to kill General Zod during the climax of Man of Steel. Artist Neal Adams suggested that other alternatives were open to Superman when Zod threatened innocent people with his heat vision, such as covering his eyes. He also criticized Superman for not moving the battle away from Metropolis as Christopher Reeve's version of the character did at the end of Superman II, causing extensive collateral damage to the city. However, Adam Holmes of CinemaBlend counters that Clark is still inexperienced as a superhero in Man of Steel, learning from his mistakes by Batman v Superman, in which he successfully drives Doomsday to space.

In the theatrical release of Justice League, viewers noted that Superman became more hopeful and optimistic and more in line with Reeve's portrayal of the character, but that his change of character was abrupt and unexplained, among many inconsistencies in the film caused by the sudden handover of directorial duties from Zack Snyder to Joss Whedon. In addition, his digitally removed mustache, which was poorly executed, was the subject of ridicule.

Contrarily, critics praised Superman's character arc in the "Snyder Cut" as being more natural, with some claiming that the best scenes in the movie involved Henry Cavill. Tom Jergensen from IGN wrote "His reunion with Lois Lane (Amy Adams) and Martha Kent (Diane Lane) is much more emotional thanks to Snyder's increased focus on how devastated the two were by his death. However, one way in which Snyder's cut doesn't vary much from the theatrical cut in conception is that Superman's role is limited by design; but here at least, he's far more prevalent as a symbol for our heroes."

Leading up to the release of the 2021 Marvel Cinematic Universe film Eternals, director Chloé Zhao stated that her interpretation of the character Ikaris in the film was heavily inspired by Superman as portrayed in Snyder's DCEU films, especially for Snyder's "authentic and very real" approach in Man of Steel, which "left a strong impression" on Zhao.

Despite the mixed reception of the DCEU as a whole, Henry Cavill's performances as Superman in the franchise became popular with audiences and helped propel him to international fame. Leading up to and following the release of Zack Snyder's Justice League, fans campaigned to Warner Bros. to bring Cavill back as Superman for a direct sequel to Man of Steel, and similarly expressed sorrow and outrage when James Gunn dropped Cavill from the role for the DC Universe franchise. Dwayne Johnson responded to these fan campaigns and began his own to bring Cavill back to the role, personally fighting for this for a number of years. This led to a cameo for Black Adam in 2022 being secured for Cavill, brokered with Warner Brothers Discovery. with the mediation of Johnson who was starring as titular character for the film, which ended up drawing much positive reception to what seemed was a permanent return to the role when Cavill appeared in the mid-credits scene of the film.

In 2024, Cavill made a cameo in the Marvel Cinematic Universe film Deadpool & Wolverine as a Wolverine variant. While trying to recruit him, Deadpool says, "We will treat you so much better than those shitfucks down the street!", referencing DC canceling his future Superman projects.

== See also ==
- Superman (franchise)
  - Superman (1978 film series character)
  - Clark Kent (Superman & Lois)
- Characters of the DC Extended Universe
