= Bruce Wayne (DC Extended Universe) =

DC Extended Universe character

Bruce Wayne Batman
- DC Extended Universe character
- Ben Affleck as Batman in Batman v Superman: Dawn of Justice (2016)
- First appearance: Batman v Superman: Dawn of Justice (2016)
- Last appearance: The Flash (2023)
- Based on: Batman by: Bob Kane; Bill Finger
- Adapted by: Chris Terrio; David S. Goyer
- Portrayed by: Ben Affleck; Michael Keaton; George Clooney (The Flash); Brandon Spink (young)
- Voiced by: Jorma Taccone (Chip 'n Dale: Rescue Rangers)

In-universe information
- Alias: Batman
- Title: CEO of Wayne Enterprises
- Occupation: Business executive; vigilante
- Affiliation: Wayne Enterprises; Justice League; Insurgency (Knightmare reality)
- Family: Thomas Wayne (father); Martha Wayne (mother); Alfred Pennyworth (adopted father); Dick Grayson (adopted son) (Note: Grayson was considered to be dead based on Snyder's planned backstory for Batman; however this is not explicitly stated within any DCEU films. While Warner Bros. Pictures stated the dead Robin referenced in Batman v Superman: Dawn of Justice to be Jason Todd rather than Grayson in their studio tour, Snyder later confirmed in promotion for Zack Snyder's Justice League that the deceased Robin was Grayson.)
- Origin: Gotham City, New Jersey, United States of America
- Nationality: American
- Abilities: Genius-level intellect; Master detective; Master martial artist and hand-to-hand combatant; Master tactician, strategist, and field commander; Peak human physical and mental condition; Mastery in stealth and espionage; Acrobatic prowess; Proficient scientist and engineer; Utilizes high-tech equipment and weapons

Bruce Wayne, also known by his superhero vigilante alias Batman, is a fictional character in the DC Extended Universe (DCEU), based on the DC Comics character of the same name. The character was portrayed by Ben Affleck in Batman v Superman: Dawn of Justice, Suicide Squad (both 2016), Justice League (2017) and its 2021 director's cut, and The Flash (2023). Fans nicknamed this iteration of the character "Batfleck", a portmanteau of "Batman" and "Affleck". In the films' universe, Bruce had already been active as Batman for twenty years before the emergence of Superman, and despite being initially at odds with him to the point of paranoia and anger, Batman comes to appreciate the former, starting the Justice League in his honor after Superman's sacrifice to stop Doomsday. The Justice League, under Wayne's leadership, fights to prevent Steppenwolf from collecting the three Mother Boxes and destroying Earth alongside his master Darkseid, eventually resurrecting Superman to aid in their collective efforts.

The DCEU marks the fifth time Batman was portrayed in film, but the first to share a film series with other DC superheroes such as Superman and Wonder Woman. Although the announcement of Affleck's casting in Batman v Superman was initially met with intense fan backlash, his performance received positive reviews despite the film's generally unfavorable reception. Affleck was later hired to write, direct, and star in his own standalone Batman film entitled The Batman before stepping down from both roles. The project would be realized as another reboot by Matt Reeves, with Robert Pattinson succeeding Affleck in the role, although Affleck would nonetheless return for The Flash, alongside Michael Keaton as a variant of Affleck's version. By the end of that film, when Barry Allen travels back in time to ensure his father is found innocent of the murder of Barry's mother, Bruce Wayne's appearance is altered and is portrayed by George Clooney.

== Fictional character biography ==
=== Parents' murder and impact ===
Brandon Spink as a young Bruce Wayne, as seen in Batman v Superman: Dawn of Justice.

Bruce Wayne was born on February 19, 1970, to Martha and Thomas Wayne. One day in 1981, after watching Excalibur with his parents, a mugger holds his parents at gunpoint, shooting both dead after a struggle in front of Bruce.

During the funeral, Wayne runs off, only to fall into a dry well, and get attacked by a swarm of bats. This would later inspire him to use that fear to battle the criminal element that took his parents' lives. Years later, Wayne becomes the CEO of his father's company, Wayne Enterprises, while also becoming Batman in the mid-1990s, defending Gotham City from danger.

=== Early years as Batman ===
At some point, Wayne recruited Robin who was then killed by Joker, with Wayne later keeping his vandalized suit to commemorate him.

Batman gets into an entanglement with Deadshot after being tipped off by Amanda Waller. While he gets the best of Deadshot, the latter pulls out his rifle and is prepared to kill Batman, but his daughter Zoe gets in the way and persuades her father to surrender. Sometime later, Batman chases down Joker and Quinn, resulting in Quinn's capture and incarceration. (Note: As depicted in the 2016 film Suicide Squad.)

=== Against Superman ===
In 2013, Wayne happens to be in Metropolis during the Black Zero event, (Note: As depicted in the 2013 film Man of Steel) which results in the destruction of several skyscrapers, including the Wayne Financial Tower, as the Kryptonians throw each other across the city. Enraged at Superman's apparent lack of concern for innocent bystanders, Wayne devotes his life to taking Superman down, deeming him a threat to humanity. Eighteen months later at a gala held by Lex Luthor, Wayne encounters Clark Kent (Superman's secret identity), a young reporter who attempts to question the billionaire's position on Batman, whom he views as a brutal criminal.

Wayne mockingly counters that Superman is dangerous but hypocrites defend him, attempting to brush him off after noticing the mysterious Diana Prince. As he plants a device to steal and decrypt information from Luthor's servers, Prince takes notice and steals the device before Wayne can get back to it, though she returns it to him at a museum gala after he tracks her down, as she is unable to bypass the military-grade encryption on the device. Wayne returns home and falls asleep decrypting the drive. Waking up from a nightmarish dream, he encounters The Flash, who tells him that Lois Lane "is the key" and to "find the others" before vanishing. Looking at Luthor's files, he finds that not only was Luthor after kryptonite, but was also researching metahumans around the world, one of which includes Prince, also known as Wonder Woman.

While attempting to intercept Luthor's men during a kryptonite shipment, Batman is stopped by Superman himself, who gives him a warning while Batman voices his desire to take him down. After seeing the explosion at the U.S. Capitol during Superman's televised public trial, Bruce becomes ever more convinced to take down the Man of Steel. He successfully steals the kryptonite on his second attempt and prepares relentlessly to fight Superman. Luthor eventually blackmails Superman into fighting Batman, finally pitting them against each other in combat. Although Superman has realized the situation and attempts to talk Batman out of it, the latter is ready to fight, subduing Superman with two kryptonite smoke grenades after a lengthy struggle. As Batman prepares to move in for the kill using the spear, Superman pleads with him to "save Martha", causing Batman to pause in confusion. When Lane intervenes and explains that Superman meant his own mother, Batman relents and sets out to rescue Martha Kent, killing mobster Anatoli Knyazev in the process, while Superman regains his strength and confronts Luthor. Luthor executes his backup plan, unleashing a monster genetically engineered from DNA from both Zod's body and his own.

Having heard of the mayhem, Wonder Woman arrives in her armor with her metahuman powers on display, joining forces with Batman and Superman against the creature. Unfortunately, while the monster is mortally impaled, an enraged dying Doomsday manages to impale Superman's chest with his huge arm-protrusion, mortally wounding him as well. Batman and Wonder Woman promptly retrieve Superman's lifeless body, seconds before the arrival of a devastated Lane. Batman confronts Luthor in prison, warning him that he will always be watching. Wayne and Prince attend Kent's funeral, and Bruce later delivers Diana a photograph of her from 1918. (Note: As depicted in the 2017 film Wonder Woman.)

=== Meeting Amanda Waller ===
One year later, he meets with Amanda Waller to negotiate about her involvement with the Suicide Squad. In exchange for Wayne protecting her reputation and working to hide her involvement with Task Force X, Waller provides him classified government documents on metahumans such as Arthur Curry and Barry Allen.

=== Forming the Justice League ===
Batman's "tactical suit" as seen in both Justice League and Zack Snyder's Justice League.

==== Theatrical cut ====
In 2017, Wayne and Prince follow on their plans to locate more metahumans in the wake of Superman's death. A global threat has arisen with the emergence of the New God Steppenwolf, who has sent his Parademons from Apokolips to plague Gotham. Wayne easily manages to persuade Allen, also known as "The Flash", to join, but faces difficulty in recruiting Curry, also known as "Aquaman", until Steppenwolf attacks Curry's home of Atlantis.

Wayne and Allen join up with Prince and Victor Stone, also known as "Cyborg", as they receive intel from Gotham City Police commissioner James Gordon. The team sets out to an underwater facility between Metropolis and Gotham City in order to rescue Stone's father Silas and other employees of S.T.A.R. Labs, whom Steppenwolf and his forces had kidnapped in an attempt to locate the last Mother Box, one of three devices sought to reshape the world. After the group rescues the employees and seizes the Mother Box to analyze it following a skirmish, Wayne decides to use the device to resurrect Superman after hearing from Stone that Silas had used it to revive him after a horrific accident. Diana and Curry are hesitant about this idea, but Wayne forms a secret contingency plan in case Superman returns as hostile.

After exhuming Kent's body, the team successfully revives Superman using the Mother Box and amniotic fluid in the Kryptonian scout ship that was used to create Doomsday. However, Superman has lost his memory, and he attacks the group after Stone accidentally launches a projectile at him. Superman remembers Batman's aggression towards him, grabbing Batman off the ground and nearly killing him, but Batman enacts his contingency plan: Lois Lane. Superman calms down and leaves with Lane to his family home in Smallville, where he reflects, and his memories slowly come back. In the turmoil, the Mother Box is left unguarded, allowing Steppenwolf to retrieve it with ease.

Without Superman, the five heroes travel to a village in Russia, where Steppenwolf aims to unite the Mother Boxes once again to remake Earth. Batman risks his own life to distract Steppenwolf while the other members separate the Mother Boxes, though the plan is unsuccessful. Superman, having regained his memories, arrives and assists Allen in evacuating the city, as well as Stone, in separating the Mother Boxes. The team defeats Steppenwolf, who, overcome with fear, is attacked by his own Parademons before they all teleport away.

After the battle, Wayne and Prince agree to set up a base of operations for the team, with room for more members, and Bruce begins rebuilding the destroyed Wayne Manor for this purpose. Wayne then makes amends with Kent, buying out the bank trying to foreclose Martha Kent's farm in Smallville and offering Superman the mantle of leadership for the newly minted Justice League.

==== Director's cut ====
Wayne is unable to get a military jet for transporting the team to fly until Stone discovers and fixes a software bug in its firmware. During the final battle in Russia, Batman utilizes his weaponry and vehicles to break through the radioactive fortification Steppenwolf builds around the Mother Boxes, single-handedly annihilates much of the Parademon army, and is joined by the rest of the team in fighting their way to the boxes. As Stone, Wonder Woman, Aquaman and later Superman confront Steppenwolf inside the cooling tower and attack the Unity, Batman eliminates the remaining Parademons on the tower, killing one in particular that had shot Allen, giving the latter time to heal and undo the Unity of the boxes by entering the Speed Force and thus indirectly playing a major role in Steppenwolf's defeat.

Sometime after, Wayne and Prince agree to set up a base of operations for the team, with room for more members, and Bruce begins rebuilding the destroyed Wayne Manor for this purpose. Wayne then makes amends with Kent, buying out the bank trying to foreclose Martha Kent's farm in Smallville. After waking up from another nightmare, he is met by Martian Manhunter, who thanks him for forming the Justice League and promises to be in touch to plan for Darkseid's inevitable return.

=== Helping Flash ===
Wayne continues to mentor Allen, becoming a close friend and helping him realize his potential as a superhero, in addition to helping him create a new suit. After Allen helps Wayne and Prince stop a bank robbery, Allen becomes nostalgic for his past and theorizes that he could go back in time to stop both the murder of his mother and that of Wayne's parents, to which the latter sternly warns against. Allen goes back in time nonetheless to save his mother, resulting in the world changing drastically, with Superman, Aquaman, and Wonder Woman not existing, Victor Stone not having had his accident yet, and an older, retired version of Wayne taking the original's place. After Allen reverses his changes to the universe, realizing there is no other way to save the world from General Zod's invasion, but makes one change that would prove that his father did not kill his mother, the universe seemingly reverts to normal, although Wayne's appearance changes again.

== Development and casting ==
Batman v Superman: Dawn of Justice was Affleck's second film as a comic book superhero; (Note: Affleck portrayed real-life Hollywood actor George Reeves, who had played Superman in the 1950s, in the 2006 film Hollywoodland, but did not directly portray the character of Superman in that film.) he played Daredevil in the 2003 film of the same name, and was initially reluctant to accept playing Batman, citing that he "felt [he] didn't fit the traditional mold. But once Zack [Snyder] showed [him] the concept, and that it would be both different from the great movies that Chris[topher Nolan] and Christian [Bale] made, but still in keeping with tradition, [he] was excited."

Affleck previously stated in 2006 that Daredevil had "inoculated [him] from ever playing another superhero". Snyder cast an older Batman to be a layered juxtaposition against a younger Superman; while "bear[ing] the scars of a seasoned crime fighter, but retain[ing] the charm that the world sees in billionaire Bruce Wayne." Nolan was involved with the casting of Affleck and he was the first actor Snyder approached for the part. The director had also discussed the part with Josh Brolin, even offering him the role prior to casting Affleck, though Brolin turned the role down due to creative differences. It was initially claimed that Bale wanted to play Batman again after The Dark Knight Rises, though he stated that his Batman does not belong in any other film and he was never approached by Warner Bros. to play the role again. Bale ultimately decided not to reprise the role out of respect for Christopher Nolan's creative direction and the fact that the Dark Knight trilogy provided a full arc for the character. Other actors considered to play the role included Jeffrey Dean Morgan, who would be cast as Thomas Wayne for the film, Jon Hamm, and Scott Adkins.

Following Justice League, Affleck stepped away from the role and English actor Robert Pattinson was cast to replace him in The Batman, beating out other actors such as Nicholas Hoult, Aaron Taylor-Johnson, and Armie Hammer, who was previously cast as the character in George Miller's cancelled Justice League: Mortal. Affleck left the role due to fatigue and a myriad of events in his personal life, though it was also alleged to be due to Snyder's departure from the DCEU and subsequent creative differences with other directors and writers. With Snyder's return to the franchise with the announcement of Zack Snyder's Justice League, a director's cut of the prior film, rumored reports of Affleck's own return to the DCEU surfaced prior to confirmation of his return in The Flash, though Pattinson will continue to star in The Batman and its sequels, which have been confirmed as being a self-contained timeline and not part of the DCEU's nor the upcoming DC Universe's main timelines.

Compared to the difficult experience filming Justice League, Affleck stated that doing reshoots for Zack Snyder's Justice League and filming his scenes for The Flash "put a really nice finish on my experience with that character". Some industry analysts interpreted Affleck's quote as alluding to the latter film being his final appearance as Batman, as The Flash also featured Michael Keaton's iteration of the character from Tim Burton's film series. Prior to the restructuring of DC Studios and the announcement of the DCU, which will feature yet another new iteration of Batman with a new actor starting in the film The Brave and the Bold, it had been rumored that Keaton's version of the character would replace Affleck's in the DCEU after The Flash, with Keaton originally reprising the role in Batgirl prior to that film's cancellation.

James Gunn had cast a stand-in double as Affleck's version of Batman in Peacemaker during a scene where the Justice League appears, though he stated that Warner Bros. had him remove Batman and Cyborg from the episode due to "upcoming DCEU projects". Despite the rumors of Affleck's Batman being written out of the franchise in favor of Keaton's version, Jason Momoa confirmed in 2022 that Affleck had filmed some scenes for Aquaman and the Lost Kingdom as part of reshoots for that film. Affleck's version was cut from the final version of the film due to Gunn and Peter Safran's plans to reboot the DCEU into their new franchise the DC Universe (DCU).

=== Behind the scenes ===
According to the September 2015 issue of Empire Magazine, which promoted Batman v Superman, Ben Affleck chose to wear a wig to match Bruce Wayne's widow's peak as commonly depicted in the comics, a decision that was initially met with skepticism by producer Deborah Snyder. Affleck also bulked up to 231 pounds with 7.7 percent bodyfat for the role before "dialing back" to 225 in order to portray Batman as a physically imposing figure, as his personal trainer Walter Norton Jr. wanted the character to look like a "heavyweight MMA fighter" who had trained daily for the past 20 years. In contrast, Affleck weighed just 198 pounds for his role in The Town.

== Characterization ==
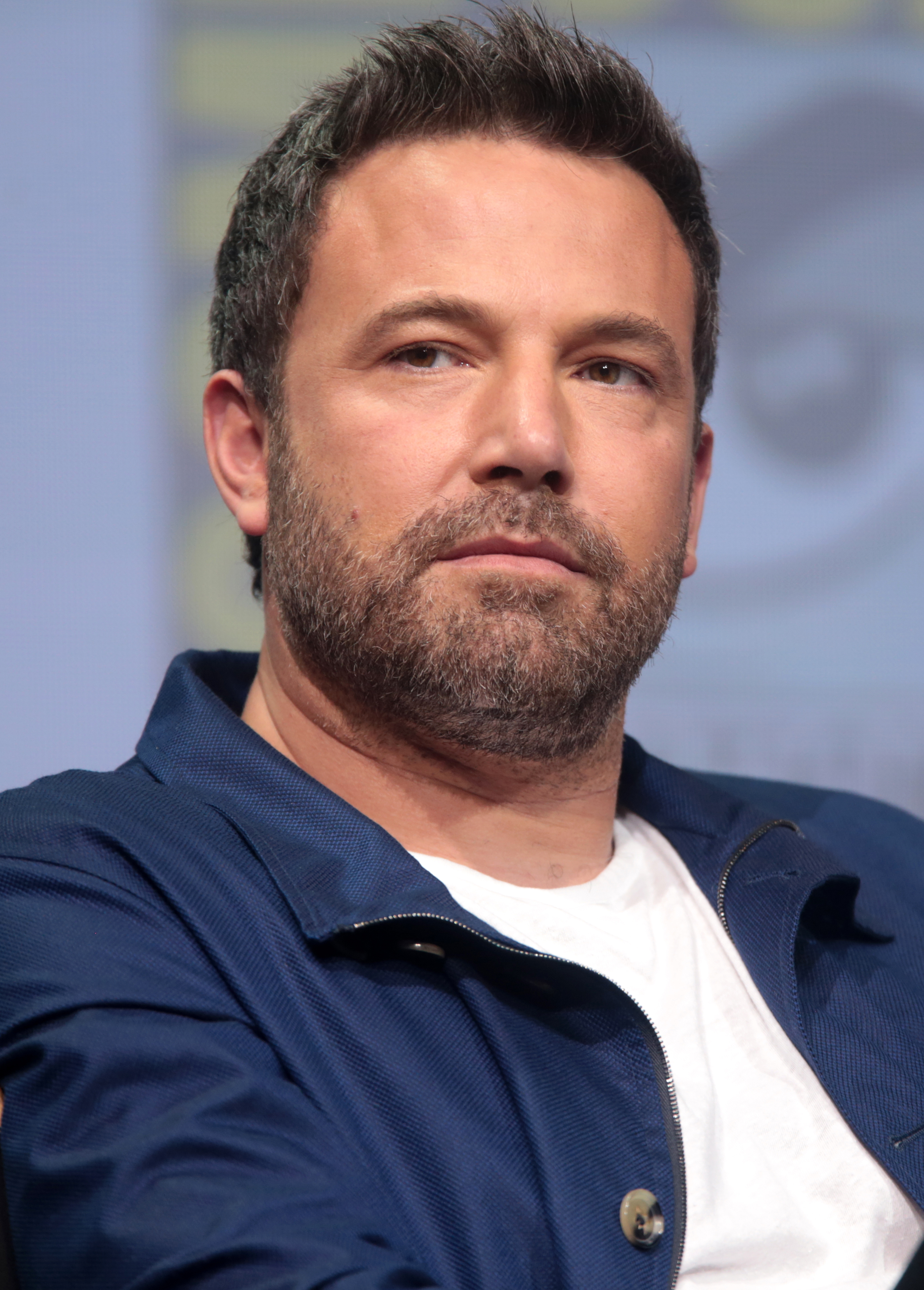
Ben Affleck portrays an older version of Batman compared to previous film franchises

The DCEU version of Batman has been noted to be more brooding and jaded than previous cinematic iterations of the character, with ScreenRant calling this iteration "the angriest we'd ever seen" in 2019, and was heavily influenced by Frank Miller's The Dark Knight Returns, which shows Batman in his 50s and willing to use far more brutal, if not outright lethal, tactics, in stark contrast to his usual traditional staunch adversity to killing. He is noticeably older than Clark Kent when first meeting him in Batman v Superman and has witnessed not only the murders of his parents at a young age, but also that of his protégé Dick Grayson, who served as Robin until his capture and death at the hands of the Joker. Affleck said this Batman "is a little older, he's a little more world-weary. He's been around the block once or twice so he's a little wiser but he's definitely more cynical and a little darker and more jaded", adding that Batman has gotten "more exposed to the violence and the criminal element of that world over time." However, like previous iterations of the character, including that of Michael Keaton's and Christian Bale's portrayals, Affleck's Batman has also become the CEO of Wayne Enterprises and taken on protecting Gotham City from a wide variety of criminals, ranging from Floyd Lawton, Killer Croc and Digger Harkness, to The Joker and Harley Quinn. Affleck's Batman shares a similarity with Bale's in that both fell into a well and were swarmed by bats, developing a phobia of the creatures that he later incorporates into his Batman persona.

Bruce is serious, calculating, and tactical, and is known to be dedicated and determined as a crime-fighter. He possesses genius-level intellect and peak physical conditioning. He is brave, bold, and willing to risk his own life for the sake of others, as demonstrated in Justice League. Despite being described as caring and selfless, he is often ruthless and violent in his war on crime, incorporating intimidation tactics into his persona and fighting style, and his inner demons sometimes overwhelm his better judgement. Unlike some interpretations of the character such as Bale's interpretation, this version, like Keaton's Batman, is willing to kill his adversaries, as seen in Batman v Superman, when he apathetically dispatches down several of Lex Luthor's minions, guns down numerous soldiers in the Apocalyptic Knightmare Reality, and even attempts to kill Superman. However, after seeing Superman's selflessness and humanity, Batman feels remorseful of his actions and affiliates with Superman, going as far as to saving Martha Kent from Luthor's henchmen.

Bruce's characterization in the theatrical cut of Justice League is noticeably different from in the director's cut, as Joss Whedon's version suddenly made Batman sarcastic, bumbling, and indecisive while Snyder's version fleshes out how Superman's sacrifice restored his faith in humanity and gives him newfound resolve, going as far as to leave behind the isolation that has defined him in favor of taking a leadership role amongst the Justice League's "wildly different" members. Snyder notes that in his original vision for the character's arc, Batman would begin a period of redemption starting in Justice League, resulting in his sacrifice in future sequels.

In an analysis of Batman's infamous "Why did you say that name?!" line after hearing Superman utter the name "Martha" in Batman v Superman, comic book artist Jay Oliva notes that the scene depicts Bruce Wayne having an episode of post-traumatic stress disorder, as he suffers flashbacks of the night his parents were killed upon being triggered by the name.

=== Voice, equipment, and vehicles ===
The primary Batsuit, worn by Ben Affleck in Batman v Superman: Dawn of Justice.

Like previous iterations of Batman, the DCEU Batman utilizes a different voice than the unmasked Bruce Wayne, but instead of manually altering his voice, he relies on a voice modulator to digitally alter it. Affleck notes that a world-famous billionaire such as Bruce Wayne would likely have his voice recognized. Zack Snyder also decided to give Batman a cloth-based Batsuit with exception to his powered exoskeleton in Batman v Superman, commenting "I had a really strong idea about what I wanted to do – I really wanted to do sort of a fabric-based Batman; not what's become the more normal, armored Batman. That's how we evolved it." A bright mind, Bruce continues to adjust his suit for certain needs, but will even look elsewhere for inspiration, as the heat-dissipating gauntlets that he and his butler Alfred Pennyworth create in Zack Snyder's Justice League are implicitly inspired by Diana Prince / Wonder Woman's metal bracelets.

According to the Warner Bros. Studios lot, the Batman v Superman: Dawn of Justice Batmobile combined inspiration from both the sleek, streamlined design of classic Batmobiles, including the 1989 Batmobile, and the high-suspension, military build from the more recent Tumbler from The Dark Knight Trilogy. Bruce has also built several other vehicles capable of switching to remote control by Alfred, including a fighter jet used in Batman v Superman and several others in both versions of Justice League, namely the "Knightcrawler", a new four-legged tank-vehicle which was designed by his father during World War II. He also utilizes a portable troop carrier called the "Flying Fox" carrying the new armored Batmobile, which the new team boards to battle Steppenwolf in Russia.

=== Themes ===
In Batman v Superman, Richard Brody of The New Yorker notices an allegory to American politics; Superman, according to Brody, represents the Republican Party, whereas Batman represents the Democratic Party. Brody feels this notion is supported by the fact that Batman's eyes glow blue when he is wearing the exoskeleton and Superman's glow red when he uses his heat vision. Brody notes:

The classic distinction between the right and the left is that the right represents the uninhibited force of natural power, while the left represents a check on natural power in the name of an idea. Batman embodies that check—and, because he himself isn't up to a mano a mano with Superman, he needs allies... Superman may be able to kill Batman at will, but Batman, in order to combat Superman effectively, has to have help. He has to make an alliance, even an unwitting one, with other forces, which, in the event, turn out to be the forces of evil, at the command of Lex Luthor.

However, Kofi Outlaw of ComicBook.com interpreted the allegory the other way around: that Batman represents "the right-wing hawk reaction to 9/11... an America that prefers security over civil liberties; the Bush-era mentality of stopping threats pro-actively before they can threaten close to home". He also compares the "Black Zero" event portrayed in Man of Steel – in which General Zod attacks Metropolis, killing hundreds of people – to 9/11. Meanwhile, Superman, Outlaw writes, represents "the more left-wing, liberal, American ideal", while Lex Luthor represents "insidious opportunists who exploited (and still exploit) the turmoil of a post-9/11, war-torn, world for personal gain." Outlaw suggests that the scene where Batman and Superman find common ground in their mothers is parallel to the notion that conflicting political ideologies still have similarities.

Richard Newby of The Hollywood Reporter adds that the Martha scene "is Bruce's opportunity to reconnect with his own humanity and the humanity of Superman. Batman doesn't end the fight because their mothers have the same name, but because he recognizes Superman as someone with a mother, and thus a human, despite his alien origins. The battle against Superman is ultimately Bruce's realization that he can be better and reconnect with humanity again. It's not a redemption, or a full change, as he does kill mercenaries at the warehouse in the following scene, but it is a start."

In addition, Ben Affleck said he liked the "idea of showing accountability and the consequences of violence and seeing that there are real people in those buildings," with the scene of Bruce Wayne at the battle of Metropolis.

As Bruce is seen assembling the eponymous team in Zack Snyder's Justice League, Snyder describes Batman's arc as being one of redemption and doing the right thing, with Bruce also feeling out of place, being "just a guy" amongst the others with god-like powers. Nonetheless, Snyder says that his "job of bringing [the Justice League] together" is "also one of the most important jobs because there would be no Justice League without Bruce."

== Alternate versions ==
=== Steppenwolf victorious ===
In Zack Snyder's Justice League Wayne, alongside the rest of the Justice League, is destroyed by a blast when the Mother Boxes are united and Steppenwolf successfully communicates to Darkseid and his army. Wayne's death is erased when Barry Allen enters the speed force and reverses time to the moment before the blast.

=== Knightmare reality ===
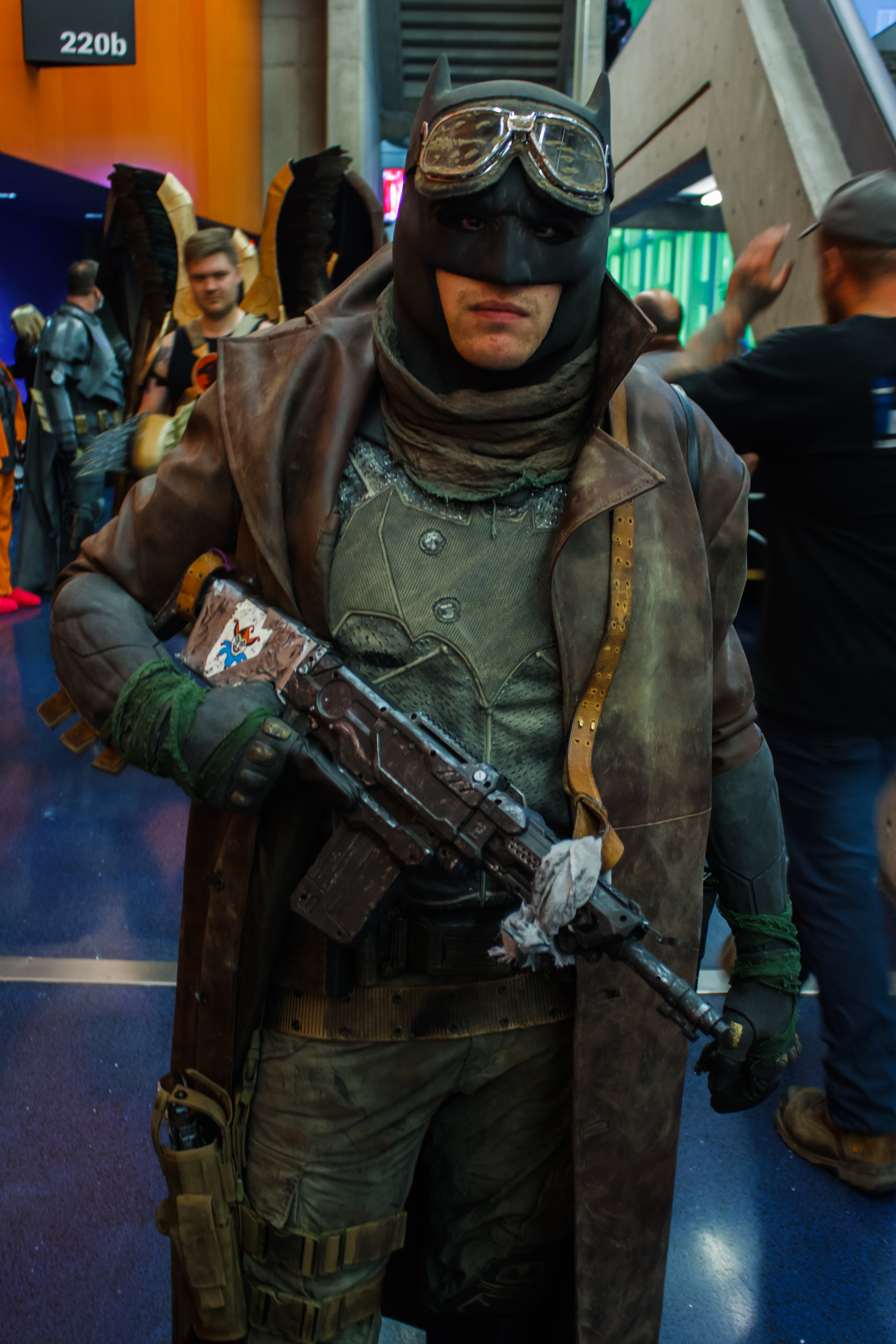
Cosplayer wearing Batman's "Knightmare" outfit as portrayed in the DCEU

Wayne experiences his first "Knightmare" dream in 2015; the dystopian reality depicts an evil Superman spearheading a regime to take over the world, with Wayne and his followers acting as a resistance group. In this world, Wayne has resorted to using firearms and killing enemies, breaking his two vows to never do so. Wayne is betrayed by some of his insurgent allies, his base is raided, and most of his men are summarily executed. Wayne then fights alone against Superman's soldiers and Parademons in a final battle, killing several before being captured and executed by the Kryptonian for taking "her from him".

In 2017, Wayne, having stopped Steppenwolf, has another "Knightmare" in the world ruled by Darkseid, joining forces with Stone, Allen, Mera, Deathstroke, and Joker, before confronting a brainwashed Superman.

=== Flashpoint ===
In the reality Barry Allen creates after stopping his mother's murder, Bruce Wayne, played by Michael Keaton, is older, retired, and has made Gotham City one of the safest on Earth through his years of crime-fighting.

Allen, alongside his younger counterpart from that timeline, enlist the help of this version of Bruce Wayne and Kara Zor-El to stop the impending invasion of General Zod. However, the group is unsuccessful and Wayne and Kara die in the effort. The Barrys try to reverse time to try and fix this but are unsuccessful every time until the original Barry realizes the only way to defeat Zod and prevent the deaths of Wayne and Kara is to restore the original timeline. After going back and allowing his mother Nora Allen's murder to occur, the original timeline is seemingly restored, but Barry's additional, seemingly minor change to exonerate his father Henry Allen, results in another modification to Bruce, in which when he arrives to congratulate Barry on his father's release, he appears in the form of George Clooney.

== Other appearances ==
=== DC Extended Universe tie-in comics ===
- Batman appears in some comics which serve as a prequel to Batman v Superman: Dawn of Justice but follow after the events of Man of Steel. In the comics, he fights and defeats Firefly and his henchmen, encounters Superman while defending middle school students from criminals armed with Kryptonian firearms, and expresses to his butler Alfred his concern that Superman will turn against humanity, whereas Alfred suggests that Bruce may have some professional jealousy towards Superman.
- Batman appears in The Flash: Fastest Man Alive, a tie-in to the 2023 film The Flash. He appears in the first issue, helping to train Barry Allen to become the hero he is meant to be. He also provides Allen with a new suit, which would be featured in the film.

=== Advertising ===
Ben Affleck appeared in-character as Bruce Wayne in a Turkish Airlines advertising campaign aired during Super Bowl 50, in which he promotes flying to Gotham City in a tie-in to Batman v Superman: Dawn of Justice. A counterpart with Jesse Eisenberg's Lex Luthor promoting Metropolis was also aired during the game.

=== Other film and TV appearances ===
- Affleck, along with Henry Cavill and Jesse Eisenberg, reprised their roles in a "deleted scene" of Batman v Superman: Dawn of Justice featuring Affleck's longtime friend Jimmy Kimmel shown on Jimmy Kimmel Live!, in which Kimmel's character successfully deduces the superhero identities of both Clark Kent and Bruce Wayne at Lex Luthor's gala, much to the chagrin of both superheroes.
- The suit and titular fight in Batman v Superman is referenced to have happened in-universe to the Batman in the film The Lego Batman Movie (2017). This sequence also features the power suit from the film.
- This version of Batman makes a cameo appearance as pencil drawings and toys in the DC Extended Universe film Shazam!. His batarang is bought by Freddy Freeman on eBay. In the film's animated end credits sequence, Batman was shown chasing the Batmobile after it was stolen by Shazam.
- Bruce Wayne and Batman are mentioned in the DC Extended Universe film Birds of Prey. Harley Quinn mentioned her arrest by Batman (as depicted in Suicide Squad) and she also names her pet hyena after "that hunky Bruce Wayne guy".
- Batman is mentioned in the DC Extended Universe series Peacemaker. He was also intended to appear alongside the rest of the Justice League, however, according to writer James Gunn, Warner Bros asked for his appearance to be removed. He was to be portrayed by stunt actor Matt Turner.
- The DC Extended Universe version of Batman makes a cameo appearance in the 2022 film Chip 'n Dale: Rescue Rangers, voiced by Jorma Taccone. In the film, Batman is depicted as a main character starring opposite E.T. in an in-universe movie, Batman vs. E.T. (a parody of Batman v Superman).

== Reception ==
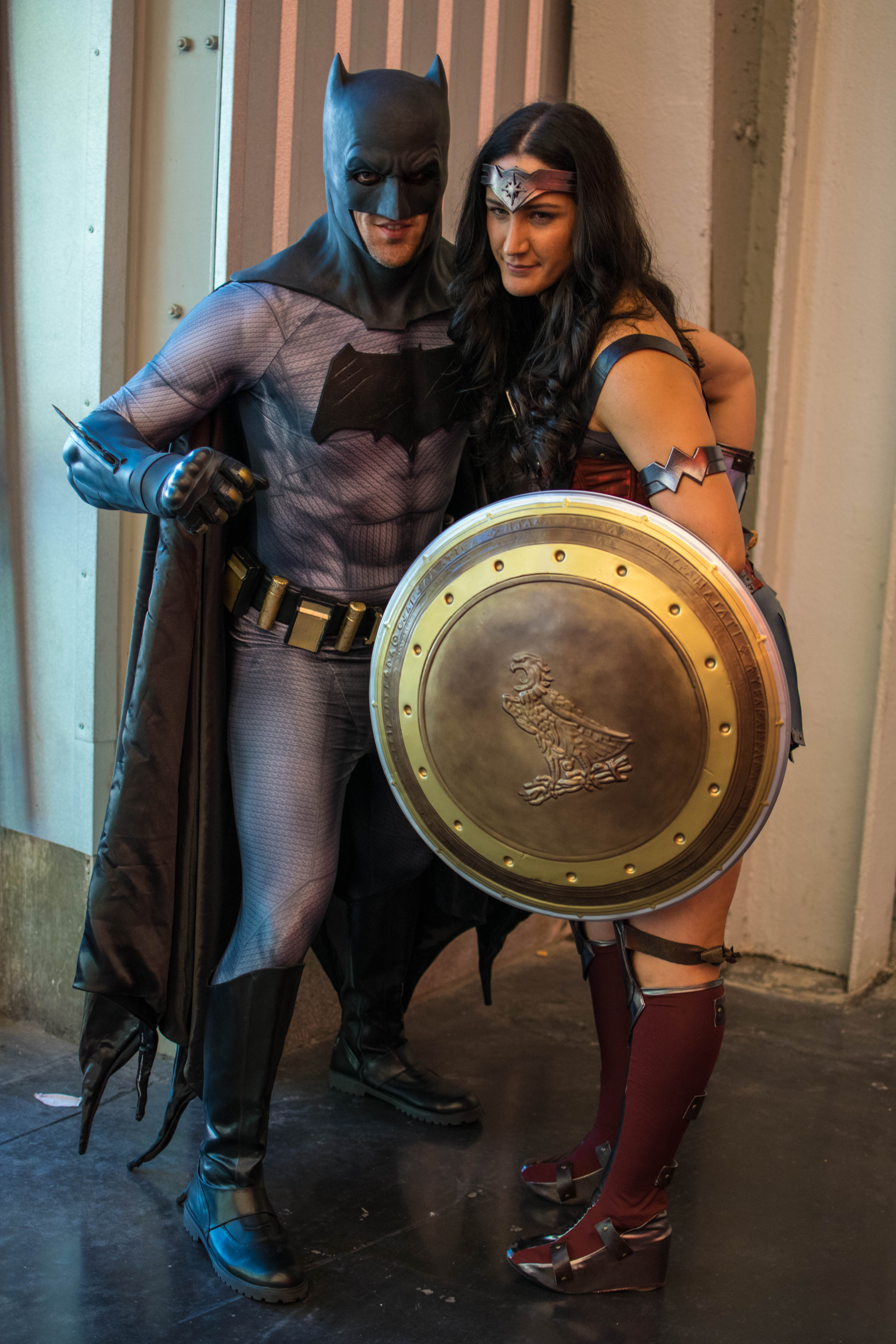
Cosplayers dressed as Ben Affleck's Batman and Gal Gadot's Wonder Woman at the 2016 New York Comic Con

Upon the release of Batman v Superman: Dawn of Justice, Affleck received considerable praise for his performance, despite the overall mixed reception of the film itself and the initial negative reaction to his casting. Conner Schwerdtfeger of CinemaBlend specifically notes that Affleck's portrayal is faithful to the comics, showcasing the best of Batman's intellectual and physical abilities while balancing both Bruce Wayne and Batman and "looking the part", whereas Michael Keaton focused too much on Batman and Christian Bale on Bruce Wayne. However, Affleck and Zack Snyder were both criticized for the decision to have Batman kill, a departure from other interpretations of the character.

Contrarily, Affleck's performance in the theatrical release of Justice League drew mixed opinions from critics; Todd McCarthy of The Hollywood Reporter wrote that Affleck "looks like he'd rather be almost anywhere else but here." Ben Sherlock from ScreenRant also noticed that Batman's characterization in the latter film was inconsistent with how he was portrayed in Batman v Superman, which was attributed to the sudden handover of directorial duties from Snyder to Joss Whedon. Affleck's performance in the director's cut of the film was much more warmly received, as Tom Jorgensen of IGN writes that Batman's motivations and character development are more comprehensive. He also adds "Hearing Batman say f*** is rad." Rick Stevenson from Screen Rant wrote "Is Batman's whole character perfect in Zack Snyder's Justice League? No, he still has some clunky moments, his Knightmare confrontation with Jared Leto's Joker feels forced and out of place, and his story isn't terribly original. But it works, and overall it works well. Zack Snyder's Justice League delivers the best version of Ben Affleck's Batman, and it's one of many reasons the new cut is superior to the original theatrical film."

After Affleck initially stepped away from the role and following announcement of the release of the "Snyder Cut" on HBO Max, a trending social media event titled #ThanksBatfleck emerged on July 24, 2020, with fans expressing gratitude to Affleck for his contributions to the role of Batman and sympathy for his reasons for departure. His casting in The Flash to reprise his role once more was well received. However, shortly following the release of Zack Snyder's Justice League, a #MakeTheBatfleckMovie campaign had started up all over social media seeking for Ben Affleck to reprise his role in a standalone Batman movie.

== See also ==
- Batman in film
  - Bruce Wayne (1989 film series character)
  - Bruce Wayne (Dark Knight trilogy)
- Characters of the DC Extended Universe
