= Lois Lane (DC Extended Universe) =

DC Extended Universe character

- DC Extended Universe character
- Amy Adams as Lois Lane in Man of Steel (2013)
- First appearance: Man of Steel (2013)
- Last appearance: Zack Snyder's Justice League (2021)
- Based on: Lois Lane by: Jerry Siegel; Joe Shuster
- Adapted by: David S. Goyer; Christopher Nolan; Zack Snyder
- Portrayed by: Amy Adams

In-universe information
- Occupation: Investigative journalist; Reporter; War correspondent; Photographer
- Affiliation: Daily Planet
- Significant other: Clark Kent (fiancée)
- Home: Metropolis, United States
- Nationality: American

Lois Lane is a fictional character in the DC Extended Universe, based on the DC Comics character of the same name. As with her comics counterpart, Lane is a reporter for the Daily Planet and the love interest for Clark Kent / Superman. She is portrayed by Amy Adams and appears in almost all films in the DCEU featuring Superman: Man of Steel, Batman v Superman: Dawn of Justice, as well as Justice League and its director's cut. Lois's character was designed to be a modern-day reporter in a world with superheroes.

== Character creation ==
=== Comics origins and previous portrayals in film ===
The character of Lois Lane first appeared in Action Comics #1 alongside Superman in the first published story featuring either character. Lois was one of the first female characters to appear in an American superhero comic strip. With her long history with the Man of Steel, she has become one of the most iconic love interests in superhero stories and has been Clark Kent/Superman's primary love interest throughout publication history. Lois has appeared in all live action adaptions of Superman, starting with her portrayal by Noel Neill in the 1948 serial, by Phyllis Coates in Superman and the Mole Men, by Margot Kidder in the 1980s Superman film series alongside Christopher Reeve, and by Kate Bosworth alongside Brandon Routh in Superman Returns. Kidder's iconic portrayal of Lane won the actress numerous awards and international recognition.

=== Casting in the DCEU ===
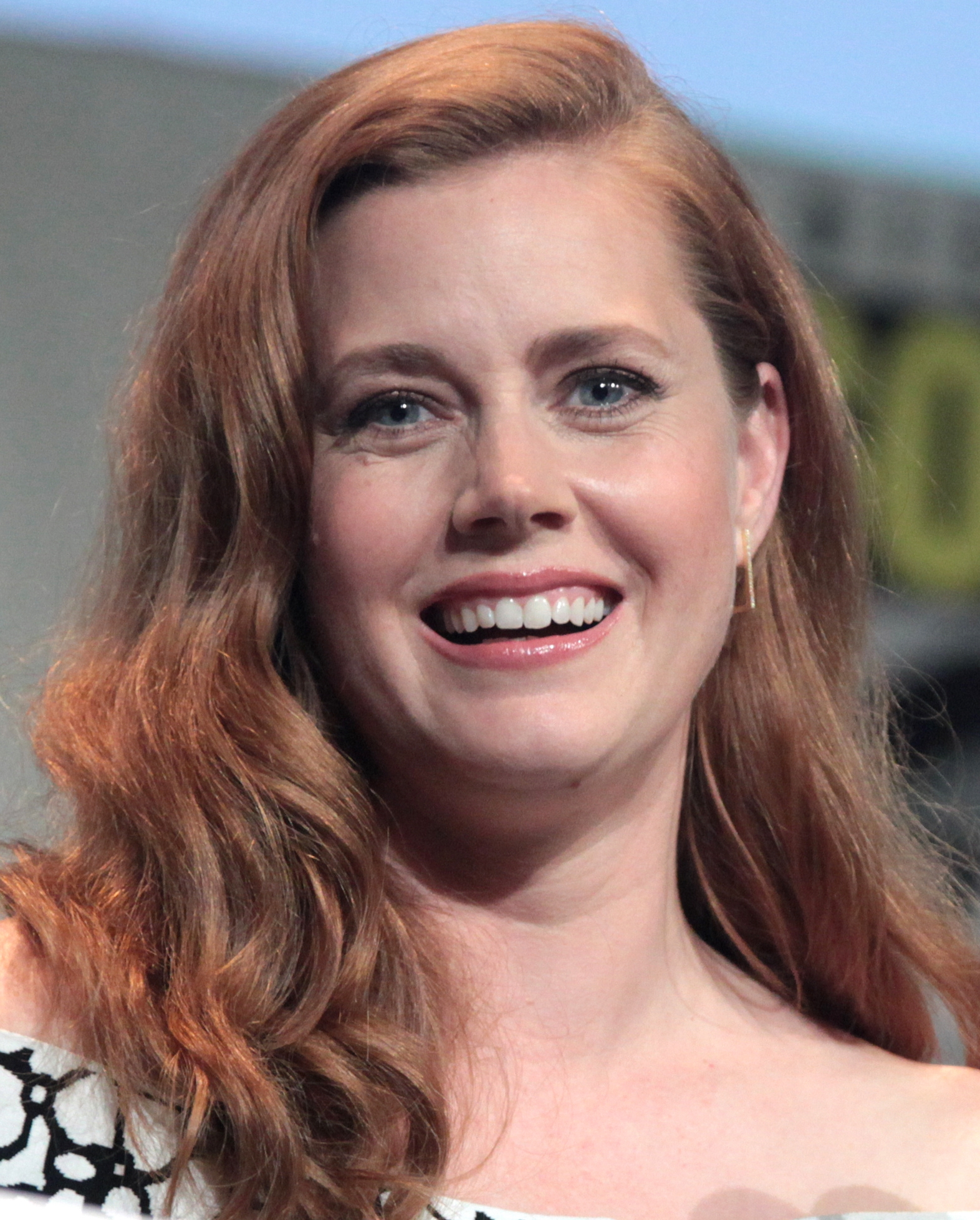
Amy Adams plays Lois in the DC Extended Universe, starting with Man of Steel (2013). She is the seventh actress to portray the character in live-action.

Actress Amy Adams was cast as Lois Lane in the 2013 Superman reboot film Man of Steel alongside Henry Cavill as Clark Kent/Superman, directed by Zack Snyder and produced by Christopher Nolan. Adams became the seventh actress to portray Lois in live action, and the first to be red-haired instead of brunette. On casting Adams as Lois Lane, Snyder said that "Amy has the talent to capture all of the qualities we love about Lois: smart, tough, funny, warm, ambitious and, of course, beautiful." Snyder said they cast Adams because she is "supermodern." Producer Deborah Snyder added "Lois is independent and definitely not a damsel in distress. And she's never afraid to get her hands dirty."

Adams described her character as following the archetype of the independent, feisty woman, but set in a more identifiable world. In her own words, she says "Lois is just very natural, nothing about her is contrived or manufactured." She also adds that "Snyder's film has a modern take on journalism: a world of blogs, instant news, online paranoia. She has become more of a free-ranging journalist, someone who likes to be hands-on. The nature of the newspaper business has changed so much. There is so much more pressure." This was the third time Adams auditioned for the role of Lois Lane in a film role. She previously auditioned for the role in Superman Returns and the aborted Superman: Flyby. Like Cavill, Adams was passed over in the former before landing the role in Man of Steel. Adams had also auditioned for a young Lois in the television series Smallville, but lost to Erica Durance.

Screenwriter Chris Terrio, who worked on Batman v Superman: Dawn of Justice and Justice League, revealed in an interview with Vanity Fair that Lois' arc in Batman v Superman, especially her "I'm not a lady, I'm a journalist" line while interviewing General Armajah, pays tribute to real-life journalist Marie Colvin, who was killed on assignment while covering the Siege of Homs in the Syrian civil war.

After the release of the theatrical cut of Justice League, Adams mentioned in early 2020 that she was open to reprising her role as Lois Lane, but has also "accepted" that Warner Bros. may be "moving in a different direction". Prior to the release of Zack Snyder's Justice League in 2021, Snyder revealed that he had considered adding a love triangle subplot to the original version of Justice League in which Bruce Wayne falls in love with Lois, but lets go of his feelings realizing that she still loves Clark and that Superman would need to be resurrected. The idea was scrapped prior to filming.

=== Characterization and themes ===
As portrayed in the DC Extended Universe, Lois had won the Pulitzer Prize for her work some time before the events of Man of Steel, with the screenplay also mentioning her stint as an embedded reporter with the First Infantry Division of the U.S. Army. She is characterized as a resolute, tough and persistent reporter, who always seeks the "big scoop" and story. When putting aside her job description, Lois is shown to be kind and fair, and after her first meeting with Clark Kent, she is so smitten with his selfless heroics, as well as the childhood pain that he had endured all his life, that she decides to drop what could have been the biggest story in modern human history for him. Adams even goes on to state that Clark is Lois's connection to humanity, saying that "She may have some tunnel vision, but she's got a job and moral standards. [When] we met her before, she would do anything to get the story – now Clark has instilled some faith in humanity in her." Superman comes to fairly quickly reciprocate her love, and after dating her for 2 years by the events of Batman v Superman: Dawn of Justice, his love for Lois becomes so great, that Clark goes so far as to let her know that "[she] is [his] world" before confronting Doomsday in a mortal duel, making those his final words. When Superman gets resurrected in Justice League and suffers post-mortem amnesia, only Lois manages to save the Justice League from him, as seeing her again makes Superman begin to remember his past life.

Lois also displays exceptional courage, risking her own life several times to aid Superman in the films. When asked about her role as Lois, Adams replied "I love that she's fearless. I'm not that way so it's really fun that she really is not afraid of the consequences." In Man of Steel, she volunteers to accompany him as he is turned over to General Zod and aids the United States Air Force in sending Zod's troops back to the Phantom Zone during the Battle of Metropolis, whereas in Batman v Superman, she stands up to Lex Luthor and works relentlessly to expose his deceptiveness, intervenes to stop Batman from killing Superman, and retrieves the kryptonite spear underwater for Superman to help him, Batman, and Wonder Woman take down Doomsday. She is also trained with firearms, shooting down some of Zod's troops with a Kryptonian sidearm in Man of Steel, though she is otherwise not shown to have other combat prowess like her comics counterpart, as the DCEU does not mention her military father Sam Lane who trains her to fight. Lois is, however, shown to be smarter than in the comics and past film depictions, almost immediately deducing Superman's secret identity and piecing together context clues with ease while investigating cases.

Continuing with the trend of Christian symbolism in Superman films, Lois is shown in a similar pose as Mary cradling Superman, who is often compared to Jesus in the films, following his death in Batman v Superman.

== Fictional biography ==
=== Encountering Clark Kent ===
In 2013, Lane is sent to cover the discovery of a mysterious craft in Northern Canada for the Daily Planet, meeting up with Col. Nathan Hardy, Dr. Emil Hamilton, and General Calvin Swanwick at a U.S. military installation. Upon seeing Clark Kent, who had taken a job at the base and a false alias to get close to the ship, sneak out at night, Lane follows Kent into the ship and accidentally triggers the craft's security system, which badly wounds her. Kent comes to her aid and cauterizes her wound with his heat vision, then returns her to safety before flying the ship off with a key given to him by his biological father, Jor-El.

Touched by Kent's kindness and intrigued by his mysterious nature, Lane begins tracking down his previous stops, finding commonality between each of his guises and heroic deeds, before arriving in Smallville, Kansas, Kent's hometown. She plans to publish an article about her mysterious rescuer for the Planet, and when her superior Perry White rebuffs her story, she leaks it to Glenn Woodburn, a tabloid reporter. Lane later finds Martha Kent, Clark's adoptive mother, and is found by Kent himself at his adoptive father Jonathan's grave. Clark explains Jonathan's sacrifice to keep his identity a secret and persuades Lois to drop the story, telling her that it is not the time to reveal himself. Returning to the Planet in Metropolis, Lane is berated again by White, though he reveals that he believes her story and is pleased when she informs him of dropping her story on Kent.

Nonetheless, the world is forced to learn about Kent when General Zod, an exiled warlord from Kent's destroyed home planet Krypton, discovers his presence on Earth and demands that Earth's citizens hand him over, referring to him by his birthname Kal-El. Lois is arrested by the FBI after Woodburn rats her out. Kent, wearing a Kryptonian uniform from the ship and hiding his identity, surrenders to the U.S. military knowing that they have Lois in custody. He is shackled and placed in an interrogation room with Lane, bonding with her until Hamilton tries to sedate him. After Kent convinces Hamilton and Swanwick to trust him, he spends a final moment with Lane before the Kryptonians arrive for him, though Faora-Ul, Zod's top ranking military officer, demands Lane to accompany them. Before Kent meets with Zod, he slips Jor-El's key to Lane, who upon using it on a key port in her cell, activates a holographic artificial intelligence modelled after Jor-El. The AI aids Lane in escaping and restoring Kent's powers on the ship, also informing her on how to defeat Zod. When Lane' escape pod begins to disintegrate in Earth's atmosphere, Kent breaks her out of the pod upon escaping the ship himself and lands her safely before engaging in a fight with Faora and other Kryptonian soldiers outside Smallville.

Lane informs Kent, now nicknamed "Superman" at her suggestion, and the military on how to send Zod and his troops back to the Phantom Zone when they begin to xenoform Earth into Krypton-like conditions. She accompanies Hardy and Hamilton on an air-carrier with the spacecraft that brought Kent to Earth, intending to activate that ship with Jor-El's key and drop it on Zod's mothership. However, Faora ambushes the aircraft after Superman destroys the World Engine terraforming the Earth, and Hardy is forced to crash the plane into Zod's ship shortly after Hamilton activates Kent's infant spacecraft when Faora approaches the cockpit, killing everyone aboard except Lane, who jumps out of the plane. When a gravitational singularity forms from the collision and pulls Zod's troops and ship back into the Phantom Zone, Superman rescues Lane once again at the risk of being pulled in himself, but pulls her to safety. After Lane shares a kiss with him, Kent encounters Zod, who had survived the battle, and engages in a destructive fight with him across Metropolis that results in Superman reluctantly snapping Zod's neck when the latter threatens more civilians. Lane comforts Kent, who is distraught at having to kill the last known surviving member of his race. In the aftermath of the battle, Kent gets a job at the Planet in order to get closer to action while discreetly maintaining his civilian identity, and Lane welcomes him to the news agency.

=== Exposing Lex Luthor ===
Two years later, Lane and Kent are dating, having moved in together. Lane is assigned to interview the warlord Amajagh in the nation of Nairomi alongside photographer Jimmy Olsen, but as Olsen and the other Americans in their party are quickly found to be CIA operatives, Amajagh and his men execute them and holds Lois hostage. Kent arrives as Superman and rescues her, but some of Amajagh's men, working as double-agents for the Russian mobster Anatoli Knyazev, cross Amajah's true soldiers and burn their bodies to make it appear that Superman killed them. Lois secretly keeps a bullet from the confrontation after returning to Metropolis. She and Kent talk about his seemingly reckless decision to rescue her and the controversy arising due to Amajagh's men appearing to have been killed by him, but Kent reassures her that he killed no one in Nairomi. Lane also expresses doubt about their relationship, but he reaffirms his love for her before the two have sex.

Lane begins investigating the bullet's origins, discovering it is not made from any known metals or manufacturers after talking to S.T.A.R. Labs scientist Jenet Klyburn. She then contacts Swanwick, now Secretary of Defense, and he reveals to her the bullet is a prototype made by LexCorp. She brings this to White, but he dissuades her from publishing the article to prevent Lex Luthor from "suing the Daily Planet out of existence" even if Lane is correct. Lois later covers Superman's public trial at the United States Capitol, but a bomb planted there by Luthor explodes, killing hundreds inside. Superman survives unscathed, but is guilt-laden by his failure to detect the bomb in time and goes into hiding. Lane contacts Klyburn again, and finds that the bomb was encased in lead to prevent Superman from seeing it. She then goes to the suspected suicide bomber's house to find evidence, but discovers he had no idea he would die at the trial, with Klyburn providing evidence of Luthor's direct involvement. Meanwhile, Bruce Wayne, the CEO of Wayne Enterprises who moonlights as Batman, dreams of an evil Superman taking over the world after being driven mad by the loss of "her" and encounters a time-traveling Flash telling him Lane is "the key".

In retaliation and to draw Superman out of hiding, Luthor kidnaps Lane and Martha Kent. He brings Lane to the top of LexCorp Tower and taunts her before pushing her off the skyscraper, but Superman arrives in time to save her before confronting Luthor. When Superman is blackmailed by Luthor to fight Batman to prevent Martha's death, Lois returns to the Planet and immediately requests a helicopter to Gotham City in order to prevent Superman and Batman from killing each other. She arrives just as Batman is about to impale Superman with a kryptonite-tipped spear, and Superman pleads with Batman to "save Martha", causing the latter to suffer a flashback about his own parents' deaths. Lois explains what Superman meant, diffusing the fight between the two superheroes and allowing them to band together against Luthor. She discards the spear in the water, but realizes its usefulness when a Kryptonian deformity created by Luthor emerges and threatens the city. She swims underwater to retrieve it but is trapped, leading to Superman assisting her to his own harm. After resurfacing, Kent bides goodbye to Lane before sacrificing himself to kill the monster with the spear, with the kryptonite allowing Doomsday to fatally stab Superman in return. Batman and Wonder Woman return Superman's body to a grief-stricken Lane.

Lane writes a cover-up story saying that Kent also died in the battle covering it in order to protect his identity as Superman, while Luthor is arrested for his crimes. She attends his funeral in Smallville with Martha, Wayne, Diana Prince, and several colleagues from the Planet, with Martha giving Lois an envelope containing an engagement ring from Clark. After Lois drops the first handful of dirt on Clark's coffin in the grave, the dirt begins to levitate after she leaves.

=== Superman's resurrection ===
==== Theatrical cut ====
In 2017, Lane is still mourning the death of Kent/Superman while continuing to work at the Daily Planet. After the Justice League resurrects Superman, Wayne's butler Alfred Pennyworth sends Lane to calm him down. Kent leaves with Lane to his childhood home in Smallville before helping the Justice League defeat Steppenwolf. Following the battle, Kent and Lane re-enter each other's lives at the Kent Farm in Smallville. Lane also writes an article at the Daily Planet about the Justice League and their heroics as well as darkness against hope.

==== Director's cut ====
Following Superman's death, Lane leaves her job at the Daily Planet and visits Kent's monument regularly. Lane only returns to work when Swanwick, using his ability as the Martian Manhunter to disguise himself as Martha Kent, persuades her to. Sometime later, Lane spontaneously witnesses the Justice League resurrect Superman through the Mother Boxes, and calms an angry, amnesiac Kent before leaving with him to Smallville, where he regains his memories and they confirm their engagement. Lane is also revealed to be pregnant with Kent's child.

In the "Knightmare" reality, Darkseid kills Lane, allowing Superman to be corrupted with the Anti-Life Equation.

== Reception ==
Amy Adams' stint portraying Lois Lane in the DC Extended Universe has received mixed reviews. While Adams' performance itself was praised for the most part, critics pointed out certain elements of her character that were poorly executed such as a perceived lack of consistency in her characterization and limited screen time. In a review of Man of Steel, Matt Zoller Seitz notes that Lois is portrayed as a capable journalist with some flirtatious moments with Henry Cavill's Superman, though they were "few and far between", and writes that some of her character development was lacking in the film, as compared to Margot Kidder's and even Kate Bosworth's portrayals of the character. JJ Rankin of Screen Rant praised Lois' depiction in the DCEU, noting her redevelopment into a more modern trope compared to previous depictions. Rankin specifically noted elements such as basing her relationship with Clark/Superman on mutual trust and friendship rather than keeping his identity a secret from her, making the relationship more realistic and sustainable, and Lois being more level-headed, independent, and critically-thinking than in the past.

Adams later commented on her lack of screen time in the theatrical cut of Batman v Superman, with her subplot on investigating Luthor being mostly cut out despite being restored in the Ultimate Edition. Her character was described as being "reduced to Superman's damsel in distress" in that film. In the theatrical release of Justice League, Lois is described as being "reduced to a bystander" by Darby Harn of Comic Book Resources and "wasted in a thankless supporting role" despite providing emotional resonance to the film by Tim Grierson of Screen International.

== See also ==
- Lois Lane in other media
- Lois Lane (1978 film series character)
- Lois Lane (Superman & Lois)
- Characters of the DC Extended Universe
