= Lex Luthor (DC Extended Universe) =

DC Extended Universe character

- DC Extended Universe character
- Jesse Eisenberg as Lex Luthor in Batman v Superman: Dawn of Justice (2016)
- First appearance: Batman v Superman: Dawn of Justice (2016)
- Last appearance: Zack Snyder's Justice League (2021)
- Based on: Lex Luthor by: Jerry Siegel; Joe Shuster
- Adapted by: Chris Terrio; David S. Goyer; Zack Snyder
- Portrayed by: Jesse Eisenberg

In-universe information
- Title: CEO of LexCorp
- Occupation: Business executive; Engineer; Criminal
- Family: Alexander Luthor Sr (father)
- Home: Metropolis, United States
- Nationality: American

Alexander Joseph Luthor Jr. is a fictional character in the DC Extended Universe based on the DC Comics supervillain of the same name. He is portrayed by Jesse Eisenberg. Luthor first appeared in the 2016 film Batman v Superman: Dawn of Justice, pitting Batman and Superman against each other in an attempt to eradicate the two superheroes. He also appears briefly in Justice League and its director's cut. Eisenberg's portrayal of Lex Luthor has been described as unorthodox compared to most depictions of the character, with his performance in Batman v Superman receiving mixed reviews.

== Character creation ==
=== Behind the scenes ===
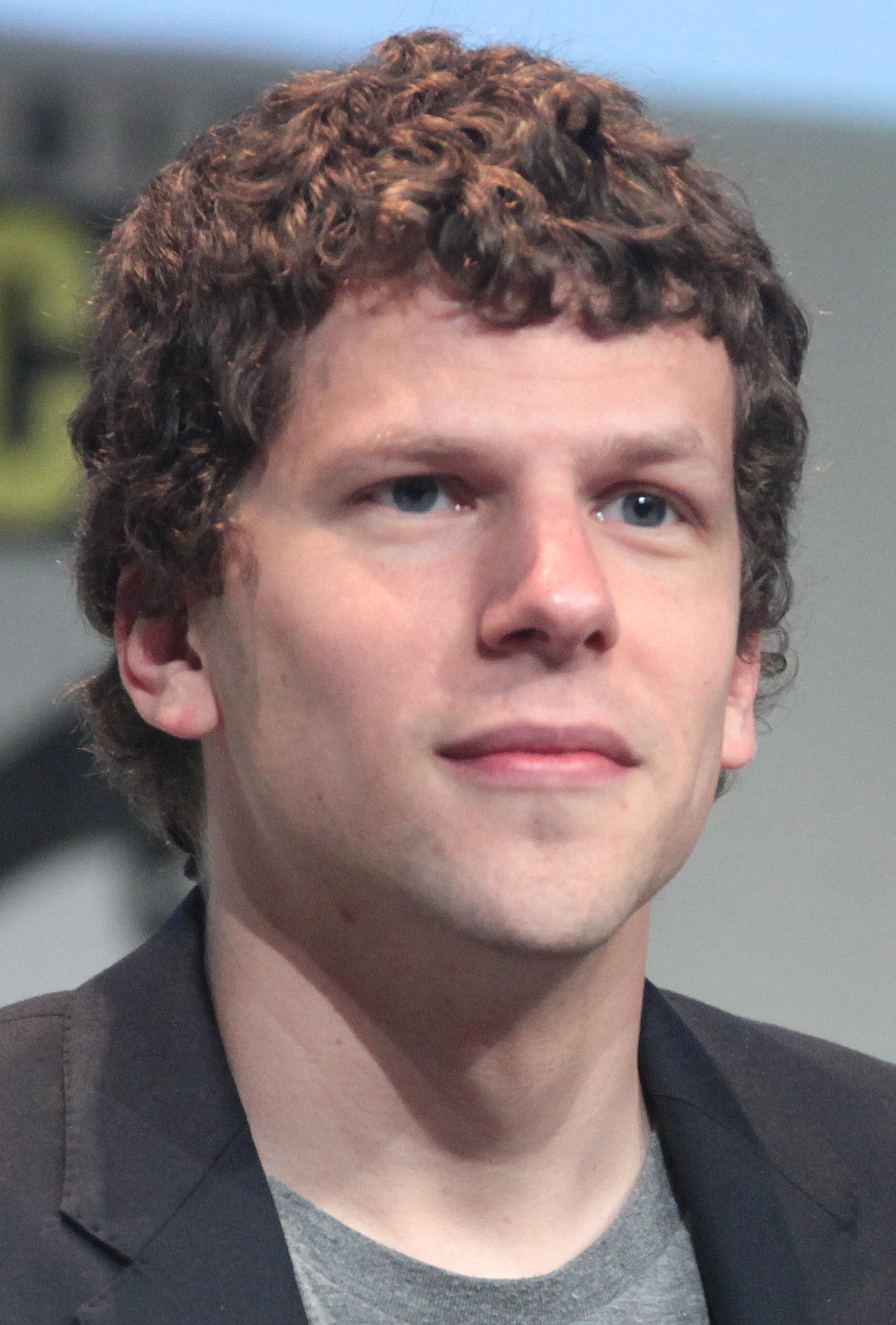
Jesse Eisenberg in 2015

On January 31, 2014, it was reported that actor Jesse Eisenberg was cast as Lex Luthor, one of Superman's greatest foes, in the DCEU film Batman v Superman: Dawn of Justice. Screenwriter David S. Goyer talked about the character in the Man of Steel sequel as a Bill Gates-like billionaire. Director Zack Snyder talked about seeing a modern take as a combination of Richard Branson and Brad Pitt. Eisenberg had also played real life billionaire/entrepreneur Mark Zuckerberg in the film The Social Network, which Kase Wickman of MTV noted and used to draw comparisons between Luthor and Zuckerberg, especially with the latter being portrayed as ruthless in said film.

Eisenberg revealed in an interview with Chris Van Vliet following the film's release that he had "no idea" which character he was auditioning for at first and expressed doubt when Snyder later revealed it was for Lex Luthor, though he later accepted after reading the script. He stated that the Luthor role "had everything in it that I really like in a character. It was kinda a guy who seems eccentric and possibly nice to the public and yet inside is really harboring these horrible feelings. And I thought, 'I could do this character really well.'" As of 2020, Eisenberg remained open to portraying Luthor again in film.

=== Characterization and analysis ===
"Lex Luthor is often considered the most notorious of Superman's rivals, his unsavory reputation preceding him since 1940. What's great about Lex is that he exists beyond the confines of the stereotypical nefarious villain. He's a complicated and sophisticated character whose intellect, wealth and prominence position him as one of the few mortals able to challenge the incredible might of Superman. Having Jesse in the role allows us to explore that interesting dynamic, and also take the character in some new and unexpected directions."

— Zack Snyder

The DCEU iteration of Luthor, as portrayed in Batman v Superman: Dawn of Justice, is noticeably different than in most comic depictions as well as Gene Hackman's portrayal of the character in the 1978–87 Superman film series. Luthor presents himself in public with a welcoming, but frantic tech bro persona, in a similar fashion to Zuckerberg. However, he is in reality a scheming, paranoid figure with sociopathic tendencies who is obsessed with bringing Superman down. He is also characterized as a misotheist, hating God and other god-like beings such as Superman as he perceives the gods failed to protect him from abuse received from his father, Lex Luthor Sr. (mentioned by Luthor as the "Lex behind LexCorp"). Eisenberg made an effort to differentiate his take on the character from that of Hackman and Kevin Spacey, and also states that his character views Superman as a genuine threat to humanity rather than simply someone to destroy. Screen Rant noted that the Luthor portrayed in Batman v Superman bears similarity to another younger iteration of Luthor in the Superman: Birthright comic series, which, like the Lex Luthor of Smallville, was portrayed as "manic and awkward," in addition to being mentally disturbed.

Also unlike most depictions of Lex Luthor, Eisenberg's version is depicted with authentic, shoulder-length hair as opposed to being naturally bald, though he gains his comic-accurate bald look after being clean-shaven in prison at the end of Batman v Superman and retains it in both versions of Justice League. Despite this, there have been several instances in the comics in which Luthor has been portrayed with hair, including Superman #10 in which Superboy accidentally causes Luthor's baldness, and later comics which depict Luthor's illegitimate son, Lex Luthor II, with a full head of hair.

In an analysis of Batman v Superman, film critic Jordan Johnson writes that Eisenberg's Luthor represents meaninglessness and the ego of mankind, which is jeopardized by the existence of the godlike Superman. He writes that "The casting of Jesse Eisenberg, decidedly recalling his portrayal of Facebook mogul Mark Zuckerberg, updates Luthor as perhaps the first truly millennial movie villain: secular, arrogant, entitled, narcissistic, obsessive in his quest to tear down the values of the old guard." Travis Bean of Forbes opined in 2020 that Luthor's characterization in the film was part of a "commentary on our society's seemingly perpetual moral-spiritual-cultural conflict," and that Luthor specifically represented "the younger generation's rampant ego and lack of faith in humanity" when compared to Henry Cavill's Superman and Ben Affleck's Batman. The book Adapting Superman: Essays on the Transmedia Man of Steel includes two chapters that incorporate analyses of Eisenberg's Luthor: the chapter "Through the Lens of Dr. Frankenstein: Luthor as Prometheus," which analyzes Eisenberg's Luthor as a version of the character that "draws attention to Promethean and Frankensteinian themes," and the chapter "Forging Kryptonite: Lex Luthor's Xenophobia as Societal Fracturing, from Batman v Superman to Supergirl," which analyzes Eisenberg's Luthor as part of "a representation exploring the cultural effects of encroaching xenophobia" from society to the family "[i]n the years surrounding the 2016 United States presidential election."

== Fictional character biography ==
=== Early life ===
Alexander Joseph "Lex" Luthor Jr. was born in 1984 in the city of Metropolis to an unnamed mother and father Alexander Luthor Sr. who was a scientist from East Germany and the founder of heavy machinery petrochemical company LexCorp and whom he was named after. Despite coming from a wealthy family and having his name be the brand of the company, the young Lex was subjected daily to physical and emotional abuse by his father which caused him to have a completely monotheistic view on God. Sometime in the year 2000, Alexander Sr. passed away of unknown causes which caused Lex to inherit and become the new owner of LexCorp and then industrialize it into a more electronic and futuristic Fortune 500 company and technology giant.

=== Man of Steel ===
While Lex Luthor does not appear in the film, he and LexCorp are alluded to in the film during Superman's final fight with General Zod in Metropolis, with Zod kicking a LexCorp tank truck towards Superman.

=== Batman v Superman: Dawn of Justice ===
Luthor is introduced as a young, eccentric businessman who is obsessed with destroying Superman. While giving off a welcoming public image, Luthor secretly manipulates certain events such as hiring Russian mobster Anatoli Knyazev to plant evidence of Superman mass-murdering an African warlord's soldiers while the superhero rescues Lois Lane, leading to the Man of Steel coming under heavy scrutiny. He also begins seeking kryptonite created from Zod's attempt to xenoform Earth into Krypton-like conditions and makes a request to U.S. Senator June Finch and other government agents for an import license for the kryptonite and access to a Kryptonian scout ship left from the Battle of Metropolis. When Finch denies his requests, Luthor persuades Finch's gullible colleague, Senator Barrows, to grant him access to the ship, developing a grudge against Finch. He covertly smuggles the kryptonite after being refused the license.

Luthor holds a gala in Metropolis, inviting reporter Clark Kent (Superman's civilian identity) to cover the event and Wayne Enterprises CEO Bruce Wayne as a guest. While Clark interviews Bruce on his thoughts on the vigilante Batman, whom Wayne secretly moonlights as, the two argue about Superman and Batman's actions before Luthor interjects himself between the two. Unbeknownst to Kent and Wayne, Luthor has been manipulating the two against each other, secretly sending reports of Batman's brutal form of vigilante justice to the Daily Planet to get Kent's attention.

Luthor also manipulates one of Wayne's former employees, Wallace Keefe, who was crippled during the Battle of Metropolis and holds Superman responsible, by intercepting his compensatory payments from Wayne Enterprises. After Keefe hits rock bottom, he vandalizes a statue of Superman and is arrested. Luthor pays his bail and gives him a chance to testify against Superman during his upcoming public trial and a high-tech wheelchair. However, this is a farce, as Luthor hides a bomb in the wheelchair and detonates it during Superman's trial at the U.S. Capitol Building, killing hundreds including Finch, Barrows, Keefe, and Luthor's personal assistant Mercy Graves. Distraught by his failure to detect the bomb, (Note: The Ultimate Edition of Batman v Superman: Dawn of Justice reveals the bomb was encased in lead, one of the few materials that can block Superman's X-ray vision.) Superman goes into hiding while Bruce Wayne views the news report of the destruction, becoming ever more intent on killing Superman.

Bruce steals a supply of Kryptonite from LexCorp as Batman, creating weapons to take on the Man of Steel. He also analyzes data stolen from Luthor during the gala and discovers Luthor is researching several metahumans in an attempt to blackmail them, sending this information to fellow attendee Diana Prince, one of the metahumans listed in the files. Meanwhile, Luthor kidnaps Lois and Clark's adoptive mother Martha Kent to draw him out of hiding. While Superman rescues Lois and confronts him, Luthor rants about his disdain for the Kryptonian "god" and reveals he has Martha held hostage in a remote location, threatening to kill her unless Superman kills Batman, forcing the two superheroes to fight. After a lengthy struggle, Batman nearly kills Superman with his kryptonite weaponry until Lois intervenes, helping them both understand their deception by Luthor.

After Batman rescues Martha from Knyazev, Luthor unleashes his "backup plan": a Kryptonian deformity created using the scout ship's Genesis chamber, Zod's corpse, and Luthor's blood, calling it Superman's "doomsday". The monster begins wreaking havoc, and after another battle that sees Superman, Batman, Diana (as Wonder Woman) and the military get involved, Superman sacrifices himself to kill it with Batman's kryptonite spear. Luthor is then arrested after implicitly communicating with Steppenwolf in the scout ship, then sent to Belle Reeve Penitentiary with his head shaven, unable to stand trial due to pleading not guilty by insanity. When Batman confronts Luthor in his cell and tells him he would be transferred to Arkham Asylum, Luthor gloats about killing Superman, convincing Batman to recruit the metahumans in Luthor's files to fight against potential global threats in Superman's absence.

=== Justice League ===
==== Theatrical cut ====
Luthor briefly appears during a post credits scene. Having escaped from prison following Superman's resurrection, he invites Deathstroke onto a private yacht to discuss forming a "league of our own" in response to the Justice League forming.

==== Director's cut ====
Luthor appears in a slightly more extensive role in Zack Snyder's director's cut of the film compared to the theatrical version. He is seen observing the effects of Superman's death scream as he views Steppenwolf's hologram in the Kryptonian scout ship prior to his arrest. His escape from prison following Superman's resurrection is also shown in detail during the epilogue, as he finds a mentally insane inmate at Arkham to take his place while he implicitly slips out, with a guard discovering the farce during a roll call. He sports a more calm and refined demeanor, which he attributes to "much needed therapy" from Arkham. Luthor and Deathstroke's scene on the yacht ends with Luthor giving Deathstroke Batman's secret identity. (Note: This was intended to have teased the original version of The Batman, in which Batman, as portrayed by Ben Affleck in the DCEU, was to have faced off against Deathstroke.)

=== Other appearances ===
==== Advertising ====
Jesse Eisenberg appeared in-character as Lex Luthor in a Turkish Airlines advertising campaign aired during Super Bowl 50, in which he promotes flying to Metropolis in a tie-in to Batman v Superman: Dawn of Justice. A counterpart with Ben Affleck's Bruce Wayne promoting Gotham City was also aired during the game. In particular, Jesse Eisenberg's part as Lex Luthor in these commercials was praised, as Dirk Libbey of CinemaBlend noted that "he matches up well with Bruce Wayne by playing the welcoming billionaire business man. It's a far cry from the somewhat cartoonish villain we've seen in the clips from the film."

==== Parodies ====
Eisenberg, along with Henry Cavill and Ben Affleck, reprised their roles in a "deleted scene" of Batman v Superman: Dawn of Justice featuring Affleck's longtime friend Jimmy Kimmel shown on Jimmy Kimmel Live!, in which Kimmel's character successfully deduces the superhero identities of both Clark Kent and Bruce Wayne at Lex Luthor's gala, much to the chagrin of both superheroes, and even to Luthor's apparent surprise.

As a promotion of Zack Snyder's Justice League on The Late Show with Stephen Colbert, talkshow host Stephen Colbert portrayed Luthor in a parody of the film's epilogue, with Luthor mistaking Deathstroke for Deadshot and Deadpool and breaking the fourth wall while attempting to explain issues with character licensing and continuity within the DCEU and other superhero franchises such as the Marvel Cinematic Universe, X-Men film series, and Sony's Spider-Man Universe.

== Reception ==
Eisenberg's casting as Luthor surprised many, with Daniel Distant of The Christian Post expressing intrigue in how the "out-of-character" Eisenberg would portray Luthor at the time of the casting's announcement, and others initially opining that Eisenberg was "too young" to portray the traditionally middle-aged Luthor. His performance in Batman v Superman received mostly negative reviews along with the film itself, later earning him the Golden Raspberry Award for Worst Supporting Actor. Andy Scott of Grunge.com specifically wrote that Eisenberg's performance was "over the top", also unfavorably comparing his Luthor to an amalgamation of his portrayal of Mark Zuckerberg in The Social Network and Heath Ledger's portrayal of the Joker in The Dark Knight.

However, in a retrospective, more positive review of the film in 2020, Travis Bean of Forbes wrote that Eisenberg's performance, which he described as essentially a "wicked, delirious version of Facebook's founder," was "misunderstood" by the majority of audiences when first seen in 2016, and that in 2020, Eisenberg's "fascinating take on DC universe’s most heinous, destructive villain would be incredibly relevant to our current volatile political climate." Renaldo Matadeen of CBR.com revisited Eisenberg's casting as Luthor after viewing the actor's performance in Vivarium and gained an appreciation for what Zack Snyder saw in him. He opined that "Vivarium is a stark reminder of the do-gooder Lex aspires to be who does bad stuff in the name of justice."

== See also ==
- Lex Luthor in other media
  - Lex Luthor (1978 film series character)
  - Lex Luthor (Smallville)
  - Lex Luthor (Arrowverse)
- Characters of the DC Extended Universe
