= Production of Justice League (film) =

Production history of superhero film

The 2017 film Justice League had a troubled production history, undergoing major changes before and during production, including a change in directors. This resulted in the theatrical release being markedly different from its conception in pre-production and principal photography.

Justice League was directed by Zack Snyder for most of its production but he stepped down during post-production after his daughter's death. Joss Whedon completed the film as an uncredited co-director, overseeing script rewrites, reshoots, runtime cuts, and other changes driven by Warner Bros. Pictures and the reception of the DC Extended Universe (DCEU) films Batman v Superman: Dawn of Justice and Suicide Squad (both 2016). The theatrical release of Justice League was a commercial failure, and received mixed reviews.

When details surfaced about its troubled production, some expressed interest in the idea of releasing an alternate cut of the film that would be more faithful to Snyder's vision. This was later petitioned by audiences, some of the film's cast and crew, and other industry figures. Although Warner Bros. initially rejected the idea, Zack Snyder's Justice League was released in 2021, on HBO Max.

== Original Snyder/Beall/Terrio script (2014–2016) ==
Following the release of Man of Steel (2013), Snyder outlined the basis of the DC Extended Universe (DCEU), which centered around a five-film arc including Man of Steel, Batman v Superman: Dawn of Justice (2016) and a Justice League trilogy. As interpreted by Stephen M. Colbert of Screen Rant, the structure of the franchise would have been the "inverse" of the Marvel Cinematic Universe (MCU). Instead of solo films culminating in cross-over Avengers films, DC would primarily feature cross-over films with occasional solo films set at different points in time.

The original Justice League that Chris [Terrio] and I wrote... a lot of it we shot [but] the actual [core] idea we never filmed because the studio was like, 'That's crazy.' And we were so insecure after [Batman v Superman] [that] we were just like, 'I guess it is crazy. There's gonna be mass hysteria if we film this.'

— Zack Snyder, Syfy Wire

Snyder opted to have Batman v Superman: Dawn of Justice as the darkest in tone, and the following films be more hopeful in tone (Snyder described his original Justice League script written with Chris Terrio as "dark" and "scary"). Concept art revealed scenes involving Apokolips and the New Gods, and were noted as being heavily influenced by science fiction and the work of H. R. Giger. In cinematographer Fabian Wagner's first meeting with Snyder, Snyder informed him he wanted to depart from the "stylized, desaturated, super-high contrast looks of other [DCEU] films", hinting at a darker tone.

As revealed in 2024, Will Beall was hired to write a very early draft for the script of Justice League. Beall's draft had the majority of the second act acting like a "little sort of coda" of the post-apocalyptic "Knightmare" future timeline that appeared in Batman v Superman: Dawn of Justice as a flashforward with the heroes and villains forced to team up, having lots of inspiration to Back to the Future Part II (1989).

In 2019, Snyder revealed part of Justice League would have seen Darkseid teleport into the Batcave and kill Lois Lane. This would eventually make Superman subject to the Anti-Life Equation and under Darkseid's control to take over Earth. In response, Batman and Cyborg would send Flash back in time to save Lois and Superman. This idea was never filmed.

== Original cut (2016–2017) ==
Batman v Superman: Dawn of Justice received generally negative reviews from critics, and mixed reviews from audiences. Criticism centered around its dark tone, lack of humor, and slow pace. This caused Warner Bros. and Snyder to reevaluate upcoming DCEU films, particularly Suicide Squad and Justice League. As such, Snyder and Terrio's original plan to make DCEU films become progressively lighter and more positive in tone was abandoned, and the "dark and weird" Justice League was rewritten to be more light hearted. Snyder cited this version to be a mixture between his original idea and the light hearted tone requested by Warner Bros.

In May 2016, Warner Bros. hired Jon Berg and Geoff Johns to oversee the DCEU, including Justice League rewrites. Batman actor Ben Affleck was hired to rewrite and serve as an executive producer on Justice League and help ensure continuity between the film and The Batman, which he was expected to star in and direct at the time. Alfred Pennyworth actor Jeremy Irons said Snyder's script was simpler, smaller and more linear than Batman v Superman: Dawn of Justice. The rewrites resulted in delays to filming, which began in May 2016.

Principal photography was shot entirely on 35 mm film and wrapped in December 2016. Months later, cuts of the film were shown to Warner Bros. executives and Snyder's friends and family. A final run-time and picture lock were achieved, though the cuts had incomplete VFX shots and partial audio mixing. Composer Tom Holkenborg completed the film's score. Snyder said that the film contained multiple cuts which needed only "a few CG tweaks" and the final version would be approved by Warner Bros. Screenwriter Mark Hughes reported that the final cut was mostly done, while The Telegraph cited a VFX expert as estimating that the studio would need another $30–40 million to finish the film. This mostly finished version of Justice League is what was often referred to as the "Snyder Cut". Citing unnamed sources of Justice League's crew "at various levels", Kevin Smith described the state of the cut as:

"When people hear 'Snyder Cut', they think an extended cut that's finished. The 'Snyder Cut' that I've heard of was never finished. It was a [film] that people in production could watch and fill in the blanks. It was certainly not meant for mass consumption".

This version of the film was 214 minutes (over three-and-a-half hours) while the assembly cut was nearly five hours long. The basic story from Snyder's Justice League was largely maintained for the theatrical release but dozens of additional scenes related to backstories, mythos, worldbuilding elements, new characters, and teases for upcoming films were removed. This included the introductions of Darkseid, DeSaad, Nuidis Vulko, Ryan Choi, Elinore Stone, Iris West, and Martian Manhunter. Sequences related to the on-screen prominence of Lex Luthor, Silas Stone, Mera, Lois Lane, and Ares were reduced, as was the time-travel plot in Snyder and Terrio's original draft. The theatrical cut instead opted to emphasize the involvement of Flash, Aquaman, and Cyborg. The depiction of Aquaman in the film and in Aquaman (2018) was said to be consistent with Snyder's intended vision.

According to insider reports, Warner Bros. executives noted the effort to lighten the film's tone but labelled it "unwatchable", citing a lack of humor. Neil Daly, who oversaw the film's test screenings, said test audiences ranked Batman and Superman the lowest of the main cast. In 2021, David Brenner, one of the film's editors, claimed Warner never screened the film to test audiences and instead viewed a 2 and a half hour cut, after which, they began initiating further rewrites. The first two trailers for Justice League used footage from this original version, and were subject to mixed reception.

== Changes during production of the film (2017) ==
After disapproving of the direction of the original cut, Warner Bros. and Geoff Johns hired filmmaker Joss Whedon to re-write the script and help with extensive re-shoots. Whedon had gone to Warner Bros. with a pitch for a Batgirl film. Johns accepted his pitch and was working with him on developing that film. Johns then saw this as an opportunity to help with additional rewrites and reshoots for Justice League. Dismissing reports that he requested Whedon's help, Snyder did hope that Whedon could give him some help by writing some "cool scenes", but only had one conversation about the studio's notes with Whedon. Snyder may also have turned down an offer to delay the release date.

Snyder was then expected to film the scenes that Whedon re-wrote, and they were working together to fix the film in accordance with the studio's requests when Snyder's daughter, Autumn Snyder, died by suicide in March 2017. He continued to work on Justice League for two months after the tragedy to distract himself, before finally stepping down in May 2017. His wife Deborah Snyder who was producing Justice League also stepped away from the project. Some reports, however, say that Snyder may have been quietly fired from the project in January or February 2017, a month or two before his daughter's suicide and several more before his official departure from the project. Once Snyder left, Whedon assumed full control over the completion of the theatrical cut of Justice League.

Whedon took over as director and directed reshoots for approximately 55 days. Then-Warner Bros. CEO Kevin Tsujihara mandated that Justice League's length was not to exceed two hours, something the studio had been pushing for throughout principal photography, but Snyder himself never took seriously, saying it was near impossible to tell his story in two hours. The film company also reportedly decided not to push back the release date (which would have allowed the filmmakers more time to properly complete Justice League), partly so that executives could keep their annual bonuses, and partly because they were concerned that AT&T might dissolve the studio after an upcoming merger, which might result in the incomplete film getting scrapped altogether. Warner Bros. COO Toby Emmerich said at the time:

"The directing is minimal and it has to adhere to the style and tone and the template that Zack set. We're not introducing any new characters. It's the same characters in some new scenes. He's handing the baton to Joss, but the course has really been set by Zack. I still believe that despite this tragedy, we'll still end up with a great movie".

In accordance with Warner Bros.' run-time limitations, the Justice League film was cut down to exactly 120 minutes (two hours) long including credits. Whedon added nearly 80 new pages to the script. Wagner, who did not work on Whedon's reshoots, roughly estimates that the Whedon's cut used only about 10% of the principal photography he shot. Holkenborg had completed his score before being replaced by Danny Elfman (Spider-Man, Batman) mid-way through post-production, although he had only composed for about two hours worth of film as Warner Bros. wanted the film to be around that runtime. Recalling the situation, Holkenborg stated that he had one meeting with Whedon and decided not continue on the project due to Whedon's negative attitude towards Snyder and the film; before he could step down, he was informed that Whedon had chosen to go with Elfman anyway.

All of the re-shot scenes were filmed digitally, using an Arri Alexa XT. Wagner was briefly contacted to return, but was busy shooting another project that was being shot in the same area and briefly visited the set, finding the atmosphere very different from the original production, corroborating statements made by Ray Fisher, Jason Momoa and Gal Gadot about the experience on set of the reshoots. Wagner also said the reshoots lasted about 55 days or 7 weeks, and said the studio brightened up the color palette of the film when Snyder was working in post and went further in this with Whedon. The scenes that Whedon wrote or re-shot for the theatrical release added a brighter tone and humor, and reduced the level of violence seen in Snyder's darker direction. Fisher has also said nearly every Snyder shot scene had a Whedon addition spliced in except the scene on the GCPD roof top with the League and Commissioner Gordon. To meet the mandated run-time, more than 90 minutes of footage from the original cut were removed, but the result still adhered to the basic outline of the story established by Snyder. While the original cut was poorly received by test audiences, the early screening of Whedon's cut scored as high as Wonder Woman (2017) did with test audiences, so Warner decided to move forward with it. However, the film's editor David Brenner has since contested this.

=== Characters removed or reduced ===
Justice League endured extensive re-writes and re-shoots that dramatically altered the final film. The above image shows Cyborg, Aquaman and Wonder Woman ready for battle in the first trailer from Zack Snyder's version before he departed the project. The below image shows the exact same shot from Joss Whedon's theatrical cut featuring an altered sky color and set design, as well as Cyborg and Aquaman being removed from the scene.

The theatrical cut entirely removed at least 10 comic book characters from Snyder's original script, among others. The original cut included a short scene where Flash saved Iris West from a car accident. Ryan Choi / Atom appeared as a S.T.A.R. Labs scientist working with Silas Stone. Cyborg's mother Elinore Stone appeared in some flashback scenes. Aquaman's mentor Nuidis Vulko appeared in an underwater scene and a cut post-credits scene. Justice League antagonist Darkseid appeared in four different scenes. Master torturer and follower of Darkseid in the comic books DeSaad played a minor role. Harry Lennix's character Calvin Swanwick from Man of Steel and Batman v Superman was planned to appear in a scene revealing he was secretly the shapeshifting alien Martian Manhunter all along. The supporting characters Silas Stone, Lex Luthor, Lois Lane, Mera, Ares, Zeus and Antiope had multiple scenes cut or reduced, but still appear in the theatrical release.

Several scenes introducing and exploring in more depth the mythologies of the three new characters to the DCEU—Flash, Cyborg, and Aquaman—were removed from the theatrical cut. In the original cut, Barry demonstrates the ability to reverse time by briefly surpassing the speed of light in a new version of the final battle, and his relationship with Bruce Wayne was established as being "between someone who is naive and excited and someone who is experienced and jaded". In the theatrical cut, much of this is removed or replaced by "forced jokes" and a scene in which Flash saves a Russian family during the final battle.

Cyborg was described as the "heart" of the film and the original script had included additional scenes of his origin story, learning to use his abilities and connecting with his cybernetic enhancements. According to Ray Fisher, the only Snyder-shot scene Whedon kept in the theatrical cut was the one of Cyborg meeting with J. K. Simmons' Commissioner James Gordon at the Gotham City Police Department's rooftop. Fisher later stated his displeasure with Whedon and the studio removing much of Cyborg's backstory, among other allegations, leading to a months-long dispute that culminated in Whedon being investigated and Fisher leaving his role as Cyborg in 2021 after reporting that Hamada was halting the investigation to protect Whedon. In the original cut, Victor's father Silas Stone dies after activating a Mother Box at S.T.A.R. Labs in an act of self-sacrifice. In the theatrical cut, Silas survives the final battle.

Aquaman had additional scenes exploring his backstory and Atlantean lore including the Dead King of Atlantis' throne and a scene involving Vulko and Mera that directly connected to Aquaman (2018). In November 2017, Jason Momoa defended the removal of these scenes, stating: "There was no need for it because you're going to see it in Aquaman. It's not an Aquaman movie, it's a Justice League movie".

Marc McClure, the actor who played Jimmy Olsen in the Christopher Reeve Superman films, appears as a cop in a few scenes in the original cut, but only makes a cameo appearance in the theatrical cut. Snyder had a non-speaking cameo in a cafe. Actor Sam Benjamin said he filmed 20–30 minutes worth of scenes for a military subplot that was cut from the theatrical release.

=== Changes to Superman ===
Closeup of Superman's face in the theatrical cut showing the "CGI lip", which has drawn ridicule.

Most of Henry Cavill's Superman scenes were re-shot by Whedon. Cavill's reshoots were scheduled around Paramount's Mission: Impossible – Fallout (2018), for which Cavill had grown a moustache. Originally, Fallout director Christopher McQuarrie agreed to let Cavill shave for the reshoots in exchange for $2–3 million to accommodate a temporary shutdown production on Fallout, but Paramount executives vetoed the idea. Another proposal to have Cavill shave and wear a fake moustache in exchange was also vetoed by Paramount executives. With no other choice, Warner then decided to digitally remove Cavill's moustache, but under a tight deadline and the film being close to its release, the visual effects team did not have the time to properly apply the CGI; the finished product was criticized for its awkward and unrealistic appearance. Nearly all of Superman's scenes throughout the film feature the CGI lip, suggesting they were all parts of the reshoots.

Following the young Superman portrayed in Man of Steel and the conflicted Superman portrayed in Batman v Superman, the version of Superman that appeared in the original cut was described as coming closer to completing his story arc and becoming more like the "true" Superman as depicted in the comics after being reborn, and donning a black costume as opposed to the standard costume seen in the theatrical version. Superman's behavior at the end of the original cut in the final battle was described by storyboard artist Jay Oliva as "unhinged".

Snyder had originally intended for the hero to wear his iconic black and silver lined suit as famously first depicted in 1992's "The Death of Superman" comic storyline. However, due to the criticism of the "darkness" of Snyder's previous DC Films by critics, Warner Bros. did not allow him to use the suit since it gave the impression of a darker film - a tone they wanted to avoid. So Snyder and his visual effects team did some testing to see how easy it is to dial the color of the suit in color correction to black. They then made some slight physical alterations to the suit to make this process easier. So throughout the filming of the film, all of Superman's footage was shot in the classic suit with Snyder hoping to convince Warner Bros. in post-production to go for the black suit. After Snyder left, Whedon ignored this idea and presented Superman using his classic suit.

=== Opening scene ===
Snyder had intended for the opening scene of the film to directly connect to Batman v Superman, similar as how Batman v Superman directly connected to Man of Steel. Whedon disregarded this, opting to film a new scene with Superman being interviewed by children, presented as a smartphone video. Since this was a reshoot, it contained Cavill's CGI lip.

A new scene filmed by Whedon had Batman use a burglar to attract a Parademon with his "fear". The burglar was played by Holt McCallany, although he remained uncredited. After catching the Parademon, it explodes, leaving a shape of the mother boxes; this never ocurred in the original cut, nor the fact that a Parademon was already in Gotham, since the Parademons only arrive when Steppenwolf finds the first mother box. According to McCallany, Whedon originally directed this scene as comedic, but Warner Bros. told Whedon to tone down the comedy.

=== Changes to Batman and Wonder Woman ===
While their arcs are mainly the same in both versions of the film, many of Batman's and Wonder Woman's scenes were reshot by Whedon, including when Diana explains the first invasion of Earth to Bruce. In addition, their dynamic is changed: while Snyder's version of the film portrays Bruce and Diana with a good working relationship and subtly hints at their mutual romantic interest, Whedon introduces a subplot in the theatrical cut in which the two characters bicker constantly, which many critics saw as a borrowed element from The Avengers (2012), which Whedon had also directed. Batman's characterization is noticeably changed, having a less serious personality compared to his version in the Snyder Cut having a newfound resolve and optimism after witnessing Superman's sacrifice in Batman v Superman.

=== Changes to Steppenwolf ===
As with Superman, many of Steppenwolf's scenes were reshot by Whedon and the character was drastically altered. Originally envisioned by Snyder as a monstrous, horned alien with seven fingers on each hand and hooved feet, Steppenwolf was "toned down" during the troubled production of the film, as Warner Bros. deemed Snyder's design as too intimidating. Whedon's "sanitized" rendering of the character gave him a more humanoid form, making him more "self aware" with "cheesier" lines, such as referring to the Mother Boxes as "Mother". The character model was inserted in numerous scenes originally featuring Darkseid. Mark Birrell of Screen Rant said that Whedon's Steppenwolf resembles a "Saturday-morning cartoon villain" who enjoys "being a bad guy", further noting that Darkseid's role in the film being almost entirely scrapped.

The flashback scene illustrating the first invasion of Earth against the Olympian Old Gods, Amazons, Atlanteans, Green Lantern Corps and humans was altered for the theatrical release. The original cut had a longer version of this scene, which included a younger version of Darkseid, a battle between Ares and Darkseid, additional footage of the Green Lantern Yalan Gur, and included dialogue from most of these characters that was removed from the theatrical release. When Darkeid stroke his axe into the ground, it created a glowing red symbol. In the original cut this was explained to be a representation of the Anti-Life Equation.

Whedon changed most of the flashback scene. Instead of Darkseid, it is Steppenwolf who invades Earth. The scene was made shorter, and never mentions the Anti-Life Equation nor explains what the symbol in the ground is.

=== New scenes and spliced shots ===
Almost all of the original scenes shot by Snyder contains new spliced shots directed by Whedon, often for the characters to make a joke. For example, while the scene of Bruce Wayne meeting Aquaman was originally directed by Snyder, a new shot directed by Whedon has Bruce looking at an artwork on a wall and asking Aquaman to point him to Atlantis. A later scene has a shot of Bruce spliced in telling Aquaman that a saying Aquaman says should be the opposite.

A new scene shot by Whedon has Bruce discussing the team with Alfred on a plane. This replaced an original scene shot by Snyder, in which he informs him this after stepping down a helicopter. The Snyder scene in which Bruce meets Barry has a shot of Barry spliced in talking about brunch. Barry's behaviour in the new scenes shot by Whedon was compared to Peter Parker in the film Captain America: Civil War, released a year before. A new scene was added in which Lois Lane talks with Martha Kent in the Daily Bugle, replacing a scene in which Martha visits Lois home.

The scene in which the League fights with Steppenwolf in the tunnel had a shot splice in, in which Barry trips and falls into Diana. Gal Gadot refused to film the scene, but Whedon threatened her career if she didn't. Gal Gadot ultimately only filmed her face reacting to Barry, while her stunt double (with her face not visible) filmed the shot with Miller on top of her.

Another new scene in which the league discusses talking about reviving Superman was shot by Whedon, replacing a scene shot by Snyder in which the team discussed the same idea. In the newly shot scene, Bruce discusses with Diana about bringing Superman back, and mentions Steve Trevor (from Wonder Woman). This was compared to the discussions of Iron Man and Thor in the film The Avengers, also directed by Whedon.

In the scene in which the League revives Superman, Whedon spliced new shots of Superman talking to Batman and asking him "Do you bleed?", a callback to a line in Batman v Superman. A new shot of Lois Lane arriving to calm Superman was also added, which Batman now referred to as his contingency plan. A new shot was added in which Batman, after Superman leaves, quips "Yeah, something's definitely bleeding." The original scene shot by Snyder had Superman not speak during the whole sequence, and calming down after Lois Lane arrives after seeing Superman being revived. Superman then takes Lois Lane to his home, and after speaking for the first time, Lois Lane tells him "You spoke." Since in the Whedon scenes Superman had already spoken when confronting Batman, Lois' line was dubbed with "You smell good."

Whedon also shot a new scene in which the League reacts to Superman leaving and Steppenwolf obtaining the last box. In this scene, Batman tells Aquaman to send a "message" to fish for help. Batman is then assisted by Wonder Woman to accommodate his arm. This replaced an original scene by Snyder, in which the team locates the mother boxes after Sillas Stone sacrifices himself and heats the mother box. Since this was removed by Whedon, Stone is seen alive at the end of Whedon's cut. Another new scene was shot in which Aquaman quips after accidentally sitting on the Lasso of Truth.

=== Final battle ===
The final battle between the Justice League and Steppenwolf's army of Parademons was largely redone. Whedon added the reddish hue coloration, the root-like structures growing out of the ground, a redesign of Steppenwolf's base of operations inside the cooling tower, and the Russian family that Flash saves. In the theatrical cut, Steppenwolf showed fear at the prospect of defeat, causing his Parademons to attack because they are drawn to the smell of fear—a plot device Whedon introduced both in this scene and the opening scene with Batman and the burglar. In the original cut, Wonder Woman decapitated Steppenwolf before he could escape through a boom tube and on the other side of the tube was Darkseid, teasing his appearance in a sequel. This is after The Flash (whose role was reduced in the theatrical cut) was able to reverse the Justice League's initial defeat (caused by the Mother Boxes becoming unified) by reversing time through use of the Speed Force to a point in time before the Mother Boxes synced together and xenoformed the world thus giving the Justice League a second chance to prevent this from happening. All of this was removed in Whedon's cut.

=== Ending ===
A new scene was filmed in which Lois Lane narrates the life of the superheroes, to end the film. This replaced the original ending in which Cyborg listens to a message his father left behind recorded on a tape.

The post-credits scene featuring Lex Luthor and Deathstroke was initially supposed to tease Ben Affleck's original version for The Batman, in which Deathstroke would have played a pivotal role. The sequence originally filmed back in 2016 during principal photography had Deathstroke and Luthor discussing about what to do with Batman, with Luthor revealing to Deathstroke that Batman was Bruce Wayne. When Affleck stepped away from directing The Batman in January 2017 (before Matt Reeves took over as director and rewrote the film to no longer be set in the DCEU) and Joss Whedon was hired to replace Snyder a few months later, the sequence was redone with a reshoot of Jesse Eisenberg's dialogue to instead tease a planned Justice League sequel not planned by Snyder or set in his universe involving the Injustice League by rewriting Luthor's dialogue.

Another early iteration for the post-credits scene planned by Snyder had the Green Lanterns Kilowog and Tomar-Re visiting Bruce Wayne at his lake house at night to further tease the then upcoming Green Lantern Corps film and Justice League sequels. Another iteration of this was Green Lantern, clarified by Snyder to be John Stewart, visiting Bruce at the lake house. In principal photography in London, Snyder only shot half of the scene with green lights shining on Affleck, with the Green Lantern side to be filmed later. Snyder also said an early idea was Ryan Reynolds (who previously portrayed Hal Jordan in the unrelated 2011 film Green Lantern) playing the "additional Lantern" in that scene but it never went beyond an idea and he never talked to Reynolds directly about it at the time. Whedon ultimately disregarded this scene.

=== Musical score ===
The theatrical cut was ultimately scored by Danny Elfman—this score was more orchestral and upbeat in sound to reflect the theatrical version's intention to have a lighter, more family friendly tone compared to the preceding DCEU films like Man of Steel and Batman v Superman: Dawn of Justice, both of which were scored by Hans Zimmer with assistance from Junkie XL (Tom Holkenborg). For his Justice League score he brought back the iconic Superman March by John Williams from the 1978 film series and also his own "The Batman Theme" originally used in the first two films of the Batman 1989 film series (which were both directed by Tim Burton and scored by Elfman) for the theatrical cut of Justice League. Elfman also reworked Zimmer's Wonder Woman theme into a more orchestral form. An excerpt from Zimmer's work on Man of Steel can be heard during the theatrical version of the film itself but is not included in the commercially released soundtrack for the theatrical cut. Elfman stated he wanted to keep things simple when scoring the film by using musical lemotifs for individual characters rather than full musical themes only developing one main theme to represent the Justice League as a whole team.

== Theatrical cut (2017) ==
Justice League came out as scheduled in November 2017, credited to Zack Snyder despite not looking or feeling or behaving like a Zack Snyder film at all. The course he'd set had manifestly been abandoned; the DCEU had taken the opportunity afforded by his absence to dramatically rebrand. The curt two-hour runtime. The brightness. The relative bubbliness. The distinctly Whedonesque quippiness. "Itchy," quips Superman, when asked by Amy Adams's Lois Lane how it felt to come back from the dead; the Flash, meanwhile, awkwardly rambles on about brunch and pratfalls face-first onto Wonder Woman's chest.

— Rob Harvilla, The Ringer

A new trailer of the film was released on July 2017, at the time Whedon was acting as director. This trailer uses a mixture of Snyder's original scenes, Whedon's new scenes, and some of Snyder's scenes now edited by Whedon. Another trailer, released on October 2017 (often called the "Heroes" trailer), had more original scenes shot by Snyder newly edited by Whedon, and it contained original unmodified Snyder scenes which would not end up in the theatrical cut.

Justice League was released on November 2017. Upon release, the film was met with mixed to negative reviews. Several critics described it as a "Frankenstein" film, in that similar to Frankenstein's monster that is composed of different humans' body parts, Justice League was the work of two different directors with competing visions for the finished product. Warner Bros. decided to move away from Snyder's vision for a shared universe of interconnected films and focus on stand-alone films and solo franchises instead. The previously announced sequel to Justice League scheduled for a 2019 release was pushed back indefinitely. Similar to the fallout after Batman v Superman, Warner Bros. initiated a shake-up of executives between late-2017 and mid-2018, ahead of the release of the next DCEU film, Aquaman. Both Jon Berg and Geoff Johns, who were hired as co-chairmen and co-runners of the DCEU after Batman v Superman to get the franchise back on track, departed DC Films at the end of 2017. In early 2018, Berg and Johns were replaced by Walter Hamada (It, The Conjuring) and Chantal Nong. Warner Bros.' head of casting Lora Kennedy departed in May 2018. The Hollywood Reporter quoted an insider familiar with the station as saying Hamada "walked into a shitshow, and he's trying to clean it up". Several DCEU actors were no longer attached to the franchise following Justice League.

An anonymous Warner Bros. executive stated in February 2021 that even the studio did not like the "stupefying" changes Whedon brought to Snyder's film, criticizing the burglar scene and the Russian family as goofy and pointless additions to the film. The executive affirmed that the finished film felt "awkward" because the studio did not want to admit what "piece of shit" it had become.

=== #ReleaseTheSnyderCut movement ===
Immediately after the theatrical release of Justice League, fans created an online petition to release the original cut, dubbed the Snyder Cut, that gained more than 180,000 signatures. The movement, which used the hashtag #ReleaseTheSnyderCut on social media, began before fans had any knowledge that a cut of Snyder's Justice League film actually existed in any capacity. The movement was ignited by the divisive reaction toward the theatrical cut, knowing that Snyder left directorial duties and the final cut of the film in the hands of Joss Whedon and the assumption that Whedon created an inferior film. The circumstances have been compared to a similar situation with the film Superman II (1980). Both Justice League and Superman II feature a director that was replaced, for different reasons, before completion of a film, which led to a second director coming in and making substantial changes to the tone of each film. Although the reasoning behind each director's departure differs, Richard Donner was able to complete his Superman II cut in 2006. Some assumed that an alternate cut of Justice League was inevitable because historically several of Snyder's films have been re-released as extended cuts for home media (Watchmen (2009), Batman v Superman: Dawn of Justice) which are seen by some critics as superior to the original version.

Ben Affleck and Gal Gadot, who portrayed Batman and Wonder Woman, respectively, both voiced displeasure working with Whedon during the reshoots, and were among the most prominent supporters of the #ReleaseTheSnyderCut movement. In fact, Todd McCarthy of The Hollywood Reporter wrote in a review of the theatrical cut that Affleck "looks like he'd rather be almost anywhere else but here". Affleck's experience on the set of Justice League, especially during the reshoots, was cited as one of his reasons for stepping down from the role of Batman. Gadot also disagreed with Whedon's choices for her character, including a controversial scene in which Flash falls on Wonder Woman's breasts, but Whedon retaliated by threatening to "make [her] look stupid" in the film. Though Gadot reported Whedon to studio executives to resolve their conflict, many of Wonder Woman's scenes and soundbytes in the final theatrical cut ultimately appear to sexually objectify her, which viewers noted was done in a similar fashion to Natasha Romanoff / Black Widow in The Avengers and its sequel Avengers: Age of Ultron (2015).

Other members of the Justice League cast and crew showing support for the Snyder Cut's release included actors Jason Momoa, Ciarán Hinds, and Ray Fisher, photographer Clay Enos, storyboard artist Jay Oliva, cinematographer Fabian Wagner, and Affleck's stunt double Richard Cetrone. Deborah said executive producers Nolan and Emma Thomas encouraged them to make the Snyder Cut. On the second anniversary of the theatrical release, the cast and crew voiced support through social media. Other film- and comic book-industry figures not related to Justice League also supported the release of a "Snyder Cut," including filmmakers Kevin Smith and Alan Taylor, television producer Steven S. DeKnight, and comic book writers Rob Liefeld, Robert Kirkman and Jerry Ordway. Members of the #ReleaseTheSnyderCut movement engaged in acts of fan activism to promote it, with a few fans even contacting Warner Bros. officials.

== Original dismissal and revival (2017-2020) ==
After leaving the project, Snyder subsequently saved the rough version of his cut on a hard drive, which had not undergone the post-production process at the time. He kept it as a "memento," so that he could show people or for "snippets" of footage to be included in a documentary, as he thought his version would not be released. Snyder sent an editor in to retrieve materials related to the film on a hard drive. However, he was asked to return them as they were considered to be studio property, but refused to do so as he said it was his "personal use." Sources said that though security was notified, no action was taken as the studio did not expect Snyder would "begin tinkering with an alternate cut of the film."

In July 2018, The Wall Street Journal reported that Warner Bros. had no plans of releasing an alternate cut of Justice League. In November 2019, both The Hollywood Reporter and Variety independently reported Warner had no plans to release the "Snyder Cut", with the latter quoting an inside source as saying, "That's a pipe dream. There's no way it's ever happening". Shawn Robbins, chief analyst for Boxoffice Pro, suggested the size of the #ReleaseTheSnyderCut movement was too small to make an impact, opining that the film "doesn't seem to be something many outside the die-hard fan base are clamoring to see." Writer Mario F. Robles, based on his industry connections, said Warner Bros. did not trust Snyder's vision and was not willing to spend the money required for its completion. Throughout the movement, various media journalists referred to the Snyder Cut as "fabled" or "mythical."

By March 2019, Snyder stated that a cut of Justice League did exist and that it was Warner Bros.' decision to release it. That November, an insider claimed Warner Bros. was unlikely to release Snyder's cut, calling such hopes a "pipe dream." Snyder later confirmed by that December that his cut was approximately 214 minutes. Robert Greenblatt, then chairman of WarnerMedia and head of HBO Max, stated that discussions surrounding the release of Snyder's Justice League began in late 2019, and lasted a few months. He emphasized Snyder's cut was not finalized, and that Warner Bros. would have to fund its completion while also clarifying issues with film unions. The studio first approached Snyder to release his unfinished cut, but Snyder rejected the option and insisted on either completing or not releasing it, leading Warner Bros. to decide if they would proceed across the next few months. According to Snyder, WarnerMedia chose to release the Snyder Cut in February 2020, after chairman Toby Emmerich acknowledged the #ReleaseTheSnyderCut movement and contacted Snyder.

The Snyders invited executives from Warner Bros., HBO Max, and DC to their home to watch a then-assembled black and white version of the Snyder Cut. Snyder also proposed various ideas for its release, including releasing the cut in an episodic manner. Impressed, the executives decided to proceed with the project. Snyder began to collaborate with the film's original post-production team for completion. Despite the process being compromised by the then-ongoing COVID-19 pandemic, which was escalating around the time, the Snyders insisted on completing it. Snyder notified the original cast of the undertaking from April and May 2020; according to Snyder, he contacted Fisher first, who initially thought that Snyder was joking. Greenblatt said WarnerMedia tried to get the news out "as quickly as possible" before HBO Max launched on May 27.

== Announcement and new production (2020-2021) ==
On May 20, 2020, Snyder announced during a Q&A after an online watch party of Man of Steel that his cut of Justice League would be released as Zack Snyder's Justice League on HBO Max in 2021. It reportedly cost more than $70 million to complete the special effects, musical score, and editing, as well as filming additional scenes with the cut also being presented in an open matte aspect ratio of 1.33:1.

Snyder stated this version is not intended to affect the future of the DCEU continuity, but that it takes place in a slightly alternate universe. Despite previous reports describing it as a mini-series, Snyder described his cut as being a four-hour movie to be viewed in "one shot".

=== Restored characters ===
Characters who were intended to debut in Snyder's original version of the film before their scenes were cut had their scenes restored, such as Darkseid (portrayed by Ray Porter), DeSaad (portrayed by Peter Guinness), Iris West (portrayed by Kiersey Clemons), and Ryan Choi (portrayed by Zheng Kai), as well as several Green Lanterns.

=== New scenes ===
Snyder also announced that he would shoot new, additional footage in order to finish his vision. Affleck, Fisher, Miller, Heard and Manganiello, along with Lennix and Jaret Leto, returned to their respective roles for additional photography, in order to finish the project.

A new Knightmare sequence was filmed by Snyder specifically for Zack Snyder's Justice League, establishing that following Darkseid's victory in the hypothetical Justice League Part Two, Aquaman and Wonder Woman have been killed, and Superman has turned evil following the death of Lois Lane. Batman has formed a makeshift Justice League with Flash, Cyborg, Mera, Deathstroke, and the Joker (with Affleck, Miller, Fisher, Heard, Joe Manganiello, and Jared Leto all reprising their DCEU roles). Cavill was unavailable, and thus was digitally imposed into the scenes using archive footage from Man of Steel and Batman v Superman: Dawn of Justice. In this scene, Batman is mocked by the Joker for failing to save those close to him, including Robin. The scene ends with the Justice League being ambushed by Superman, and Bruce Wayne waking up from this vision.

Snyder then finished shooting the scene when Bruce Wayne talks with the Green Laterns at his lake house; Snyder filmed what was missing at his house's driveway with actor Wayne T. Carr playing John Stewart, and also included Martian Manhunter, with the two speaking to Bruce about Darkseid, setting up Justice League sequels and the Green Lantern Corps film, instead of Kilowog and Tomar-Re. However, Warner Bros. Pictures did not like the idea of Snyder introducing John Stewart as they had their own plans for him elsewhere; a compromise was made and Snyder repurposed the scene to instead only include Martian Manhunter.

=== Restoring of Steppenwolf's original design ===
Steppenwolf as he appears in the theatrically released Justice League (top) and Zack Snyder's Justice League (bottom)

When working on the original cut, Snyder had to "tone down" the designed he had originally envisioned for Steppenwolf, that was briefly seen in the director's cut of Batman v Superman. This was requested by Warner Bros., which deemed the original design as "too scary".

During post-production of Zack Snyder's Justice League, which happened during the COVID-19 pandemic, several special effects studios were shut down or inaccessible, resulting in some unused visuals intended for the 2017 cut being unavailable and needing to be re-rendered. This included the rendering of Steppenwolf, who was "built from scratch" for the new cut, also because the character had reverted to Zack Snyder's original design. Hinds described Steppenwolf's characterization in Snyder's version as "old, tired" and trying to find a way to escape his role of servitude under Darkseid, with the character speaking more "poetically" but less frequently, resulting in a more intimidating and menacing presence. His armor, in particular, was rendered by Weta Digital as a bevy of spikes that appear to move with the character's emotions and also follows his design as a "space knight". Anders Langlands, one of the supervisors at Weta, comments that "Zack had the idea that his armor would react to his mood and be part of his performance, as if it was some kind of alien technology that’s symbiotic with him." In contrast to the theatrical cut, the director's cut depicts him as a tragic villain and "space knight" in similar fashion to a "fallen angel", as he is aiming to escape his role of servitude under Darkseid and regain his commander's favor.

=== Changes to Superman's suit ===
Snyder also returned to his idea about Superman using a black suit. Snyder's reasoning behind using the black suit was that it resembles Superman's character more inwards, specifically his Kryptonian heritage while the blue suit resembles his role on Earth, as humanity's protector, hero, and leader. Superman choosing the black suit is an indication that his character journey is not yet complete as Snyder's originally planned vision for his DC films was a 5-6 film arc that focused on Superman with the character at the end of the arc becoming the classic iconic Superman from the comics. Cavill did not film any new scenes with the black suit, and instead Snyder altered the footage Cavill filmed for the original cut, transforming the classic suit into a black one.

=== Musical score ===
When Holkenborg was rehired by Zack Snyder to score the film, he mostly disregarded the material Elfman had used for Whedon's version. Holkenborg's new score overall is much less whimsical and less traditionally orchestral than Elfman's score for the theatrical version. It focuses on orchestral elements such as brass, percussion, electronica, piano and electric guitar, similar to the approach he and Zimmer used in their previous DCEU work, in order to further emphasize the film having a similar feel to the first two DCEU films. Holkenborg also created new themes for established characters such as Batman and Wonder Woman.

== Zack Snyder's Justice League (2021) ==
On August 22, 2020, the first teaser was released during the DC FanDome event, which featured a remix of the song "Hallelujah" (1984) by Leonard Cohen. It was considered to be a highly anticipated part of the event, and well received by audiences and critics. The trailer had leaked hours prior to its planned debut in the DC FanDome event. Julia Alexander, writing for The Verge, had remarked that those desiring a "more Snyder vibe to the film overall should be pleased," while Alex Abad-Santos of Vox observed the inclusion of scenes not included in the theatrical version, such as the death of Cyborg's father and Wonder Woman receiving the signal from the Amazons. Critics also enjoyed the presence of Darkseid, Superman's black suit, and the inclusion of Iris West's scenes, which was omitted in the theatrical version, in the trailer. In early November, the original teaser was temporarily removed from HBO Max's social platforms due to the expiration of the rights to "Hallelujah." On November 17, the third anniversary of the theatrical release, an updated version with new footage was uploaded in black and white on Snyder's Vero account and in color on HBO Max's social media accounts. In July 2023, the trailer was delisted from YouTube again after a music licensing issue. It had by then gained over 31 million views, making it Max's most-viewed trailer. (Note: The streaming service HBO Max rebranded itself as Max after it merged with Discovery+, which had begun its roll-out by May 2023.)

Warner Bros. also announced a tie-in meal kit product based on the design of the film's Mother Boxes and menu items inspired from the characters it had developed in collaboration with Wonderland Restaurants, a DC Comics-themed restaurant operating in London. On February 14, 2021, the first official trailer for the film released. Snyder had previously been releasing sneak peeks for the trailer on social media, including showing the Batmobile and Jared Leto's Joker. As such, Abigail Covington from Esquire had said that the trailer "expands on those earlier previews" and highlighting the action sequences, Darkseid, and Superman's black suit. Charles Holmes of The Ringer highlighted Leto's appearance as Joker in the trailer, particularly his line, "We live in a society," and felt that the trailer "doubles down" on Snyder's aesthetics, but was skeptical if the film would be superior to the theatrical version. On March 14, the final trailer for the film released, with Daniel Kreps at Rolling Stone writing that it featured "many of the hallmarks that made Snyder's version of the blockbuster so mythic in the first place." Two days later, DC published three variant covers of the film in the comic book issue, Justice League #59, written by Brian Michael Bendis, penciled and inked by David Marquez, and colored by Tamra Bonvillain. The covers were drawn by Lee Bermejo, Liam Sharp, and Jim Lee.

Zack Snyder's Justice League was released on March 18, 2021, in the United States. It was initially going to be released on September 5, 2021. It is also available to stream on HBO Max in 4K, HDR in both HDR10 and Dolby Vision, and Dolby Atmos. Unlike the theatrical version which was rated PG-13, this version received an R rating for "violence and some language." Ten days prior to the scheduled debut of the film, HBO Max accidentally released the film to some viewers that were attempting to watch Tom and Jerry (2021). A week after the film's HBO Max release, the Justice Is Gray Edition was released on the platform, and in the UK through Sky Cinema on April 30.

The film was released internationally on several platforms: on HBO Go in select Asian countries; Binge in Australia; Crave in Canada; HBO services in select European countries; on digital services such as Amazon Prime Video and the iTunes Store in France; (Note: The film was originally scheduled to release on April 22, 2021, in France, but was later moved up to the simultaneous worldwide launch.) on KinoPoisk HD in Russia & CIS countries; digital services such as BookMyShow, Hungama Play, Tata Sky and the iTunes Store in India; Neon, Sky Go, and Sky Movies Premiere in New Zealand; and on Now and Sky Cinema in the United Kingdom. The film was also released on HBO Max in Latin America when the service launched on June 29, 2021.

=== Limited theatrical release ===
While the cut was originally planned to release as a four-part miniseries in addition to a single film, Snyder said on Vero in January 2021 that the cut would be released as a "one-shot." WarnerMedia later confirmed this in a press release, describing Zack Snyder's Justice League as a "full-length [HBO] Max Original feature film." The film is dedicated to Autumn Snyder's memory.

Snyder expressed his interest in screening his film in IMAX theaters once they were safe to re-open during the COVID-19 pandemic. A black and white version of the film, titled "Justice Is Gray Edition," had an exclusive theatrical release on July 19, 2022, with three IMAX screenings in New York City, Los Angeles, and Austin, Texas. Proceeds from the event were donated to a charity for the American Foundation for Suicide Prevention. For the theatrical release of the film, Snyder added a 10-minute intermission into the film accompanied by the score track "The Crew at Warpower." The film was released in an open matte 1.33:1 aspect ratio alongside IMAX 1.43:1. The film was screened in full color for the first time on IMAX on April 30, 2023, as the last film in a "Snyderverse Trilogy" three-day event to benefit suicide prevention.

=== Home media ===
The film was released May 24, 2021, on 4K Ultra HD, Blu-ray, and DVD in the United Kingdom. It was released on Ultra HD Blu-ray and Blu-ray in Hong Kong, Australia, Germany, and Italy on May 25, May 26, and May 27, 2021, respectively. A limited edition SteelBook was announced for the UK by HMV with pre-orders starting March 22. According to Warner Bros UK, pre-orders for the home media version sold out in the first 20 minutes of releases. It was released in the United States and Canada on September 7 on Blu-ray, DVD, and 4K, and a week later on those same platforms in Canada. The film was digitally released on July 19, 2022.

=== Critical response ===
On the review aggregator website Rotten Tomatoes, 71% of 314 reviews are positive, with an average rating of 6.7/10. The site's critical consensus reads, "Zack Snyder's Justice League lives up to its title with a sprawling cut that expands to fit the director's vision – and should satisfy the fans who willed it into existence." According to Metacritic, which calculated a weighted average score of 54 out of 100 based on 46 critics, the film received "mixed or average reviews." The scores of the film are higher on both sites than what the 2017 film received (39% and 45, respectively).

After filming the new scenes with Snyder, Ben Affleck changed his mind about not returning as Batman and appeared in The Flash (2023).

== Outline of Snyder's cancelled Justice League sequels ==
External image
- Justice League trilogy outline
- T-shirt design by Zack Snyder posted to his Twitter account. The cryptic logo allegedly outlines Snyder's entire plan for his five-film arc, including his Justice League trilogy.

Scripts for two sequels to follow Snyder's Justice League were never written and never had writers assigned to them, but Snyder had a plan for their stories and comic-book artist Jim Lee drew breakdown boards for them. Production was expected to begin shortly after the release of Justice League, but work on the first sequel, tentatively titled Justice League: Part Two was stopped when Snyder stepped down in May 2017 and was pushed back indefinitely in December 2017 in favor of a stand-alone Batman film titled The Batman starring Ben Affleck, which similarly never came to fruition and was converted into a separate, standalone project entirely. After the commercial flop of Justice League caused Warner Bros. to re-think their DCEU strategy and move away from Snyder's vision, Snyder and members of the cast and crew slowly began leaking details about his Justice League trilogy plan. Those details include: (Note: The following are mostly based on storyboards created by Zack Snyder, with the help of Jim Lee, and were a very rough outline for his 5-movie arc. They were made in 2014-2015, and by the release of Batman v Superman, these storyboards became outdated and abandoned as Snyder's vision evolved. They are on display at The Dreamscapes of Zack Snyder's Justice League exhibition in downtown Dallas, Texas.)

- After being teased in Zack Snyder's Justice League, Darkseid would have been the main villain of Justice League Part Two.
- The "Knightmare" would have been important to the plot. Snyder's plans for the "Knightmare" future and beyond were loosely inspired by the plot of the 2013 video game Injustice: Gods Among Us and Grant Morrison's 2008-2009 DC Comics crossover storyline "Final Crisis" and Geoff Johns' 2011 DC crossover storyline "Flashpoint".
- An early version of the first Justice League film's script, according to Snyder in the YouTube podcast of Anthony and Joe Russo, had a romantic subplot between Batman and Lois Lane prior to Superman's resurrection, citing that romance as a result of Lois being a "pretty amazing person" and his wish to incorporate the subplot to highlight Amy Adams' acting talents. He compared the storyline to the common war film-like plotline where a soldier's wife moves on after believing her husband died only for him to resurface and reveal his survival, hence why Lois would see herself in a difficult situation due to still loving Superman but Batman having already fallen for her.
- Justice League Part Two would have featured the fall of Earth and its xenoformation into a copy of Apokolips as teased by Cyborg's vision of "the future" in Zack Snyder's Justice League. Darkseid would have killed Lois Lane in the Batcave while Batman himself would have been unable to stop him, ultimately making Superman susceptible to the Anti-Life Equation through his grief, resulting in his corruption and eventual alliance with the forces of Apokolips as Earth's tyrant ruler. This would have forced the Flash—the only survivor of an attack by the evil Superman, to escape through time travel using a cosmic treadmill built by Cyborg. This plot device was also alluded to in the events of Batman v. Superman: Dawn of Justice, during which Barry Allen, presumed to be from the "Knightmare" future, broke through time to warn the present Wayne about Superman's impending threat to the planet before realizing he went back "too soon" for Bruce to understand what he was referring to.
- Following a now cut ending scene from Zack Snyder's Justice League (2021), which originally featured Green Lanterns John Stewart, Kilowog and Tomar-Re, later repurposed to Stewart and Martian Manhunter before being reworked to solely involve the latter, members of the Green Lantern Corps were expected to appear in Justice League Part Two including Hal Jordan. Producer Charles Roven was rumored to be interested in having Mark Wahlberg play The Corps' most famous member, though he was never officially cast in the role. In earlier scrapped ideas from 2014 to 2015, of Justice League Part 2 and Part 2A, Hal Jordan would have been introduced in the final Justice League film set in the "Knightmare" timeline. By 2016, with those ideas having been partly scrapped and altered, it seems plans changed for Hal to also appear a bit earlier in Justice League 2 alongside the Green Lantern Corps.
- According to Snyder, the scene in Batman v Superman with crosses over Superman's dead body was a cryptic reference to events in Justice League 2.
- In spite of having no plans to originally feature him in Justice League Part One, Snyder planned to flesh out the past story between Batman and the Joker in Justice League Part Two by exploring how Robin died, including flashbacks of how the Joker murdered Dick Grayson before burning down Wayne Manor and confronting Batman. The way this sequence would have gone was that there was a Last Supper-inspired moment with the resistance in which they all tell each other stories, as they believe they are going to die the following day, with the Joker's story being of how he killed Robin. Snyder said the fight sequence would have been shown on screen, as Robin "does [not] go down without a fight".
- While on the set of Star Wars: The Rise of Skywalker (2019) at Pinewood Studios—where Justice League was also created—Kevin Smith met with some of the crew who worked on Snyder's films and learned about what the future would have held. He revealed that Justice League 2 was supposed to end in defeat, comparing it to the films The Empire Strikes Back (1980) and Avengers: Infinity War (2018).
- Also according to Smith, Justice League 3 would have been set entirely in the post-apocalyptic "Knightmare" Earth seen in Bruce Wayne's dream sequences in Batman v Superman and Zack Snyder's Justice League, with a rough synopsis of it being, "The heroes' last stand against Darkseid and the forces of Apokolips". Conversely, Snyder later stated that it would have been Justice League Part Two that was set in the post-apocalyptic "Knightmare" Earth.
- Justice League 3 would have featured a time-traveling Flash avert the apocalyptic future by preventing Superman's fall into darkness, travelling back to the events of Part Two. As a result, Batman was to sacrifice himself to save Lois from Darkseid, resulting in Superman becoming the leader of the Justice League and the central character of the film.
- Following Batman's sacrifice, Superman would have reverted to his classic suit, completing his 5-6 film character arc as intended by Snyder since Man of Steel by uniting mankind and other armies around the Earth once more for the upcoming showdown against Darkseid and his Apokoliptian forces, including aircraft carriers, United States Army Special Forces members, Atlanteans led by Aquaman rising out of the ocean, Amazons led by Wonder Woman coming off Themyscira, and even the Green Lantern Corps. Hippolyta would have died in the war, with Diana succeeding her as queen of the Amazons. Aquaman would have united all the kingdoms of the sea and be recognized as their true king for uniting with the surface world. Sometime after the war, the Amazons would open up Themyscira to the rest of the world again. Meanwhile, Barbara Gordon, who would have been introduced to Snyder's story arc in the Ben Affleck-directed The Batman (2022), would replace her father as Commissioner of the Gotham City Police Department upon his retirement, and would have assumed Batman's crimefighting duties as Batgirl, until the powerless son of Superman and Lois became the new Batman 20 years later.
- According to storyboard artist Jay Oliva in August 2023, in addition to the intended "Darkseid quadrilogy" by Snyder that would have ended up with "a Justice League Unlimited version" of the "Snyder-verse", Warner Bros. planned to make a Flash trilogy, which was at different points of development with directors like Seth Grahame-Smith and Rick Famuyiwa, that would have culminated in a "Flashpoint" film adaptation similar to Oliva's DC Universe Animated Original Movies (DCUAOM) film Justice League: The Flashpoint Paradox (2013) that would have revealed that Professor Zoom had been behind the DCEU's events, being in the background during most of the trilogy while having some influence over the Justice League films, provoking the Flash into changing the universe in a way that everyone is enemies with those who used to be their allies, forcing Flash to reboot the film series in a way that could have introduced a new cast due to the studio feeling that the starring actors would wish to move on from their roles after a decade.

In January 2019, Snyder released a T-shirt as a reward for donating to a crowdfunding campaign, with all proceeds going toward the American Foundation for Suicide Prevention. His design, which resembles the Kabbalah Tree of Life, is said to contain the plot of his five-film arc including a planned Justice League trilogy within a mosaic of cryptic symbols and phrases. The reverse side of the shirt has a quote from Joseph Campbell, American literature professor famed for his creation of the Hero's journey, which reads: "All the gods, all the heavens, all the hells, are within you". The Dreamscapes of Zack Snyder's Justice League Exhibition in downtown Dallas revealed an outline for Justice League Parts 2 and 2A by Snyder, lettered by Geoff Johns, and with art by Jim Lee; it showed costumes and props that were used in the additional photography for Zack Snyder's Justice League.

=== Current status ===
In February 2021, Snyder stated that as far as he knew, Warner Bros. had no interest in hiring him for further Justice League sequels or any DCEU films overall. Snyder revealed at Justice Con 2021 that he had cast Wayne T. Carr as John Stewart / Green Lantern and filmed footage with him for the film's epilogue but was turned down by the studio.
