= Zack Snyder's Justice League =

2021 film by Zack Snyder

- Promotional release poster
- Directed by: Zack Snyder
- Screenplay by: Chris Terrio
- Story by: Chris Terrio; Zack Snyder; Will Beall
- Based on: Characters from DC
- Produced by: Charles Roven; Deborah Snyder
- Starring: Ben Affleck; Henry Cavill; Gal Gadot; Ray Fisher; Ezra Miller; Jason Momoa; Harry Lennix; Amy Adams; Jeremy Irons; Diane Lane; Connie Nielsen; J. K. Simmons; Ciarán Hinds; Amber Heard; Joe Morton; Ray Porter
- Cinematography: Fabian Wagner
- Edited by: David Brenner
- Music by: Tom Holkenborg
- Production companies: Warner Bros. Pictures; Access Entertainment; Dune Entertainment; DC Films; Atlas Entertainment; The Stone Quarry
- Distributed by: HBO Max (Note: In regions where HBO Max is unavailable, the film was released on home media and various streaming and PVOD platforms by Warner Bros. Pictures.)
- Release date: March 18, 2021 (U.S.)
- Running time: 242 minutes
- Country: United States
- Language: English
- Budget: $70 million (Note: The theatrical Justice League cost around $300 million to produce (Before Snyder left, the budget was $275 million). Former WarnerMedia chairman and then-head of HBO Max Robert Greenblatt had indicated that the amount required to finish the Snyder Cut would likely cost more than the reported $20–30 million. After the announcement of reshoots to film brand new footage, the estimated cost rose to around $70 million.)
- Box office: $16.4 million (DVD/Blu-Ray disc sales revenue)

Zack Snyder's Justice League is the 2021 director's cut of the 2017 American superhero film Justice League, the fifth film set within the DC Extended Universe (DCEU), which is based on the DC superhero team Justice League. It is director Zack Snyder's original vision of the film prior to his departure from the production. The film follows Batman (Ben Affleck), Wonder Woman (Gal Gadot), Cyborg (Ray Fisher), Aquaman (Jason Momoa), the Flash (Ezra Miller), and Superman (Henry Cavill) as they form an alliance to stop the extradimensional New God Steppenwolf (Ciarán Hinds) and his army of Parademons from conquering Earth for his overlord, Darkseid (Ray Porter).

The production of the theatrical film was difficult, and the script frequently underwent major changes. In May 2017, Snyder stepped down during production following the death of his daughter Autumn, and Joss Whedon was hired to finish the film, completing it as an uncredited additional director. Whedon wrote and directed new sequences and incorporated a brighter, more humorous tone while significantly reducing the runtime in accordance with directives from Warner Bros. Pictures. The theatrical version polarized critics and underperformed at the box office, prompting Warner Bros. to develop future DCEU films around individual characters with less emphasis on a broader shared universe.

Many people expressed interest in Snyder's version of the film, often colloquially referred to as the Snyder Cut. Although most industry insiders reported its release unlikely, Warner Bros. moved ahead with it in February 2020. In May 2020, Snyder announced it would be released as Zack Snyder's Justice League on HBO Max. $70 million was spent to complete the visual effects, score, and editing, with new material being shot in October 2020. The film is dedicated to Autumn's memory. Zack Snyder's Justice League was released on HBO Max in the United States on March 18, 2021. It became the fourth-most-streamed film on the platform that year. The film was released to positive reviews from critics, who generally considered it better than the theatrical cut, but criticised the lengthy runtime.

This is also the last film in the DCEU to be directed or co-written by Snyder, as well as his last film to involve Warner Bros. Pictures. The next film in the franchise The Suicide Squad (2021) would be the last he and his wife Deborah Snyder would executive produce.

== Plot ==
Thousands of years ago, Apokoliptian warlord Darkseid and his Parademons attempt to invade Earth using the combined energies of three Mother Boxes to form "the Unity", an event that would instantly devastate Earth and xenoform it into a copy of their homeworld. This would allow Darkseid to harvest the Anti-Life Equation, a secret power capable of controlling all sentient free will in the multiverse, from the planet unchallenged. However, the invasion is foiled by an alliance of the Old Gods, Amazons, Atlanteans, humanity, and extraterrestrial beings. The Mother Boxes are divided between the Amazons, Atlanteans, and humans, hidden in different locations.

Millennia later, Superman's death following the battle with Doomsday (Note: As depicted in Batman v Superman: Dawn of Justice (2016)) reactivates the Boxes. This attracts Steppenwolf, Darkseid's disgraced lieutenant who seeks to regain his favor. Steppenwolf reaches Themyscira through a portal and fights to obtain the Amazons' Mother Box. Diana Prince informs Bruce Wayne, as the two seek to form a team of metahumans to protect the planet. After failing to recruit Arthur Curry, Bruce locates Barry Allen, who joins enthusiastically.

Diana locates Victor Stone, who joins after his father, Silas, and other S.T.A.R. Labs employees are kidnapped by Parademons seeking humanity's Mother Box. Steppenwolf kills Atlantean guards and takes their Mother Box, forcing Arthur to join the group. Victor retrieves the last Mother Box, which he had hidden. He reveals his father used it to rebuild his body after a car accident, explaining that the Boxes can rearrange matter. The group realizes they could resurrect Superman using the Box. They exhume Clark Kent's body and place it in a Kryptonian ship. (Note: As depicted in Man of Steel (2013)) They successfully resurrect him, but Clark fails to remember who he is and attacks the group. Lois Lane arrives and placates him, and they go together to Clark's family home in Smallville, allowing him to regain his memories. Steppenwolf retrieves the last Mother Box, but not before Victor's father sacrifices himself to supercharge it with laser heat, allowing Victor to track it. Without Superman, the five heroes travel to the abandoned Russian city of Pozharnov, where Steppenwolf aims to form the Unity.

The team fights their way through the surrounding Parademons, with Superman arriving in time to subdue Steppenwolf. However, Victor fails to prevent the Unity, as Earth begins to be destroyed. Barry enters the Speed Force, which reverses time in order to provide Victor the necessary charge, allowing him and Superman to prevent the Unity. Working together, the team kills Steppenwolf, but Darkseid vows to return to Earth for the Anti-Life Equation. In the aftermath, Bruce and Diana make plans to set up a base of operations for the newly formed alliance at the desolated Wayne Manor. Clark resumes his double life in Metropolis, with Lois implied to be pregnant with his child. Arthur meets with Nuidis Vulko and Mera before going to see his father, (Note: As depicted in Aquaman (2018)) and Barry informs his erroneously convicted father in prison that he has acquired a job in Central City's police department. Victor is inspired by a message left by his father to realize his purpose in life.

Later, Lex Luthor, who has escaped from Arkham Asylum, is visited on his yacht by Slade Wilson, to whom he reveals Batman's secret identity. At home, Bruce awakens from an apocalyptic dream of the future, (Note: Similar to the "Knightmare" scene in Batman v Superman: Dawn of Justice) in which he is amongst a resistance troop being hunted by a vengeful Superman, due to the implied death of Lois Lane, with Batman being blamed as responsible. Bruce receives a visit from the Martian Manhunter, who promises to help the Justice League prepare for Darkseid's return.

== Cast ==
- Ben Affleck as Bruce Wayne / Batman:
  The co-founder of the Justice League dedicated to protecting Gotham City as a proficient vigilante, director Zack Snyder described Batman seeking redemption in Zack Snyder's Justice League, feeling guilty due to his actions in Batman v Superman: Dawn of Justice (2016).
- Henry Cavill as Clark Kent / Superman:
  A Kryptonian survivor with superpowers based in Metropolis, he serves as the inspiration for the Justice League, later becoming a member of the team. In 2018, Cavill described Superman as he appears in Snyder's Justice League as coming closer to completing his character arc that began with Man of Steel (2013) and becoming the "true" Superman as depicted in the comics. Snyder said while he loves the traditional portrayals of the character, he wanted Superman to have a realistic arc and develop as a character, and not be a "one-dimensional Boy Scout."
- Amy Adams as Lois Lane: A reporter for the Daily Planet and the love interest of Clark Kent.
- Gal Gadot as Diana Prince / Wonder Woman: An immortal demigoddess princess and Amazon warrior. She is a co-founder of the Justice League.
- Ray Fisher as Victor Stone / Cyborg:
  A former college athlete who, after being cybernetically reconstructed after a nearly fatal car accident, is turned into a techno-organic being enhanced by adaptive biomimetic alien technology. Much of Cyborg's character development was removed in the theatrical release, and Snyder described Cyborg's role in Zack Snyder's Justice League as "the heart of the movie." Fisher also stated Cyborg's arc is emotional and allegorical of "the journey that Black people have taken in [America]," as well as representative of people with disabilities. According to Fisher, the only Cyborg scene directed by Snyder in the theatrical release was that of Cyborg meeting with Batman and Commissioner Gordon at the Gotham City police rooftop.
- Jason Momoa as Arthur Curry / Aquaman: An Atlantean half-blood with aquatic and telepathic powers.
- Ezra Miller as Barry Allen / The Flash: (Note: Credited offscreen as the Flash)
  A Central City college student pursuing a degree in criminal justice in the hopes of exonerating his father of the murder of his wife, Barry's mother. He is capable of moving at superhuman speeds and entering the Speed Force to time-travel.
- Willem Dafoe as Vulko: An Atlantean who acts as Arthur's mentor.
- Jesse Eisenberg as Lex Luthor:
  Superman's nemesis and former head of LexCorp, his appearance at the end of the film was originally intended to tease Affleck's now-reworked The Batman project rather than a potential sequel.
- Jeremy Irons as Alfred: Bruce Wayne's butler who provides tactical support for Batman and the Justice League.
- Diane Lane as Martha Kent: Clark Kent's adoptive mother.
- Connie Nielsen as Queen Hippolyta: Diana's mother and Queen of the Amazons.
- J. K. Simmons as Commissioner Gordon: The Gotham City police commissioner and an ally of Batman.
- Ciarán Hinds as Steppenwolf:
  A New God military officer from the planet Apokolips who leads an army of Parademons to search for the three Mother Boxes on Earth. Hinds had previously described Steppenwolf as "old, tired, still trying to get out of his own enslavement to Darkseid." Steppenwolf was redesigned for the new release, bringing his appearance closer to Snyder's original vision.
- Zheng Kai as Ryan Choi:
  A scientist working at S.T.A.R. Labs, under the leadership of Silas Stone. By the end of the film, Choi is promoted to Director of Nanotechnology at the company. The character was intended to star in a spin-off, with Snyder having pitched a film to the studio, which would have featured Choi as The Atom, and have taken place in China with a Chinese cast.
- Amber Heard as Mera:
  An Atlantean who has hydrokinetic powers and was raised by Arthur Curry's mother, Queen Atlanna. Unlike her appearances in the theatrical version and Aquaman (2018), Heard uses a pseudo-Queen's English accent throughout the film.
- Joe Morton as Silas Stone: Victor Stone's father and the head scientist at S.T.A.R. Labs.
- Lisa Loven Kongsli as Menalippe
- Nick McKinless as Ares.

Ray Porter portrays Darkseid, a tyrannical New God from Apokolips. Darkseid did not appear in the theatrical release, with the film being the character's first appearance in live-action. Porter portrayed Darkseid through motion capture and "went through a few different vocal gymnastics trying to figure out the voice." He was unfamiliar with Darkseid upon being cast, with Snyder and screenwriter Chris Terrio helping him with their knowledge of comics. Peter Guinness portrays DeSaad, Darkseid's master enforcer and liaison between him and Steppenwolf.

Harry Lennix reprises his DCEU role as US Secretary of Defense Calvin Swanwick, later revealed to be J'onn J'onzz / Martian Manhunter. Snyder stated Swanwick was always Martian Manhunter since Man of Steel and secretly guided mankind to do good as he wanted humanity to try to protect Earth themselves before intervening. Jared Leto reprises his role from Suicide Squad (2016) as the Joker, a psychopathic criminal and Batman's arch-nemesis, who becomes a surviving resistance member in the Knightmare future. The Joker was not planned to appear in Snyder's original version, but he chose to use and redesign Joker for it following its revival as he intended to use Joker.

Karen Bryson portrays Elinore Stone, Victor's late mother, while Kiersey Clemons portrays Iris West, Barry Allen's future love interest. Actors reprising their roles from previous DCEU films include: Eleanor Matsuura as Epione, Samantha Jo as Euboea, Ann Ogbomo as Philippus, Doutzen Kroes as Venelia, Carla Gugino as the Kryptonian ship's voice. Uncredited appearances include Robin Wright as Antiope, Billy Crudup as Henry Allen, Kevin Costner (via archival voice recording and still photograph) as Jonathan Kent, Joe Manganiello as Slade Wilson / Deathstroke and Russell Crowe as Jor-El (also via archival voice recording).

Sergi Constance and Aurore Lauzeral portray the roles of the Old Gods Zeus and Artemis, respectively. Julian Lewis Jones and Francis Magee are credited with portraying the Ancient Atlantean king and the Ancient king of men, respectively. Michael McElhatton appears as Black Clad Alpha, the leader of a terrorist group who clash with Wonder Woman. John Dagleish appears as Black Clad Beta. Marc McClure has a brief cameo as Jerry, a police officer who befriends Lois Lane. Ingvar Sigurdsson appears as Mayor. Kobna Holdbrook-Smith appears as Detective Crispus Allen. Taylor James appears as Atlantean Military Messenger; while Hadrian Howard, Victor Gardener, and Bruce Chong appear as Atlantean Generals. Orion Lee and Oliver Gatz appear as Star Labs Scientists. William Atkinson and Sam Benjamin appear as Military Police. Green Lanterns Yalan Gur and Kilowog also appear, while Granny Goodness appears through computer-generated imagery (CGI) and was modeled after Weta artist Jojo Aguilar's aunt. Wayne T. Carr was going to appear as John Stewart / Green Lantern at the end of the movie, but the scene was deleted and was replaced by Harry Lennix's Martian Manhunter.

== History ==
=== Production of Justice League ===
Following the release of Man of Steel in 2013, director Zack Snyder outlined his vision for the DC Extended Universe (DCEU), consisting of a five-film arc including Man of Steel, Batman v Superman: Dawn of Justice (2016), and a Justice League trilogy. Snyder's original intention was for Batman v Superman to be the darkest in the franchise, and have subsequent films become lighter in tone. However, Batman v Superman was poorly received, with criticism for its dark tone, slow pacing, and lack of humor. Distributor Warner Bros. Pictures and Snyder re-evaluated upcoming DCEU films, particularly Suicide Squad (2016), which had already wrapped principal photography, and Justice League, which was a month away from filming. Thus, Snyder and screenwriter Chris Terrio rewrote Justice League to change its tone. Cinematographer Fabian Wagner said Snyder wanted to "get away from the stylized, desaturated, super-high contrast looks of other films in the franchise."

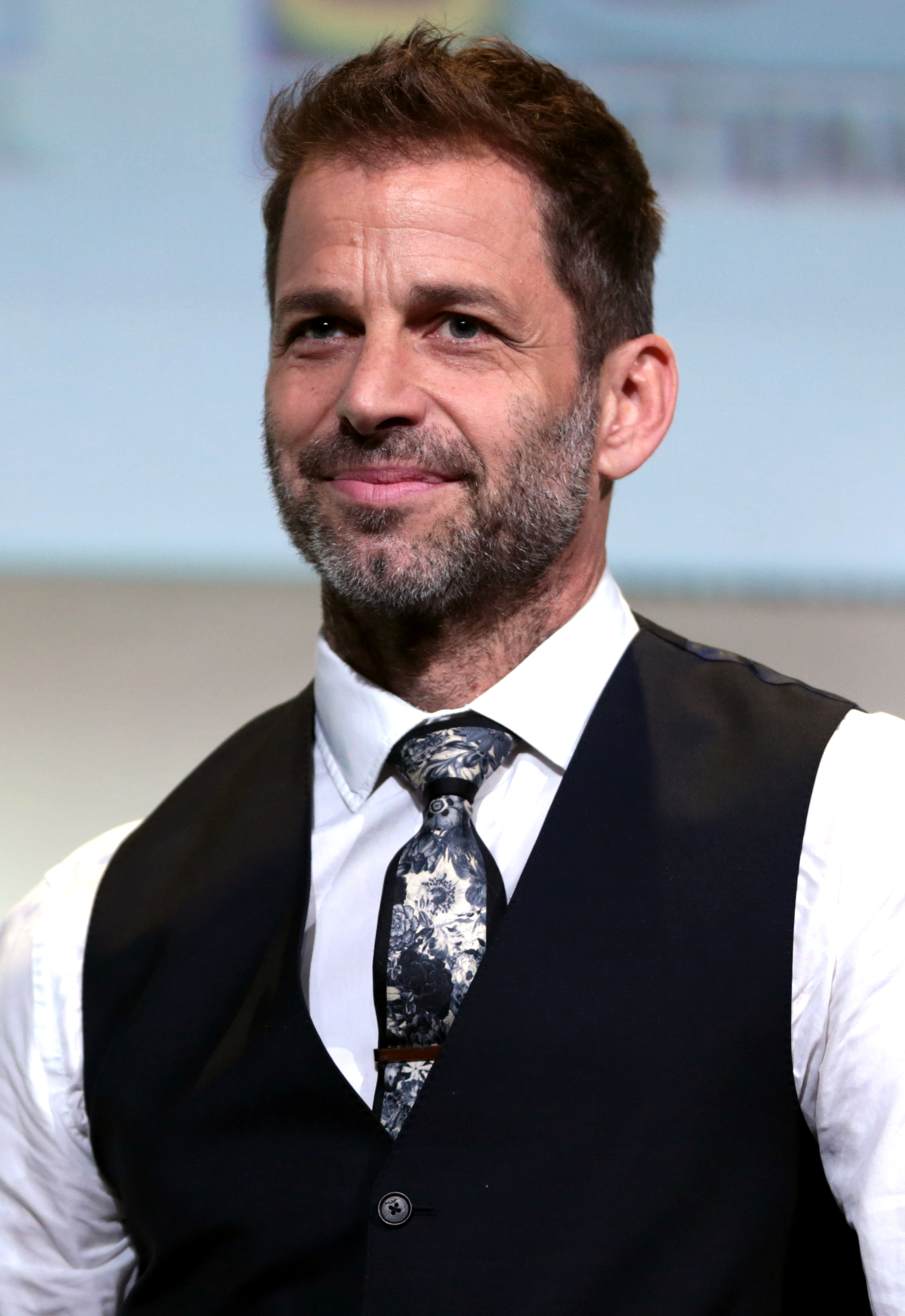
Zack Snyder, the director of Justice League

Principal photography for Justice League began in April 2016 and wrapped the following December. Months later, multiple cuts of Snyder's Justice League were shown to Warner Bros. executives, in addition to friends and family of Snyder. A final run-time and picture lock were achieved, though the cuts had incomplete visual effects shots and partial audio mixing. Snyder said his multiple cuts were essentially "done," only requiring "a few CG tweaks" for completion. Forbes contributor and film screenwriter Mark Hughes reported that Snyder's cut was more than 90% complete, while The Daily Telegraph cited a visual effects expert estimating that Warner Bros. would need another $30–40 million for completion. Snyder began screening his rough versions of Justice League by February 27, 2017, with studio executives disliking it as they felt the plot was too complex and decided to pivot.

==== Theatrical version ====
After disapproving of Snyder's direction, Warner Bros. hired Joss Whedon, who directed the Marvel Cinematic Universe (MCU) films The Avengers (2012) and Avengers: Age of Ultron (2015), to rewrite the script and help with extensive reshoots. Warner Bros. CEO Kevin Tsujihara mandated that Justice League's runtime could not exceed two hours. Warner Bros. decided not to delay the film partly due to concerns that parent company AT&T might dissolve the studio in an upcoming merger which would later happen in 2022. Snyder was expected to film scenes that Whedon re-wrote, and they were working together to meet Warner Bros.' requests when Snyder's daughter, Autumn Snyder, died in March 2017. Though Snyder was initially open to Whedon rewriting the script, he eventually became more resistant as Warner Bros. began granting Whedon more directing privileges. However, he did not directly challenge it as he and his family were dealing with Autumn's death.

Snyder left Justice League that May, and producer Deborah Snyder, his wife, left shortly after. A source claimed in February 2018 that Snyder was quietly fired by the studio approximately three months prior to the public announcement of his departure. Whedon later assumed full control over production, although Snyder retained directorial credit. Whedon added nearly 80 pages to the script, and Wagner estimates that Whedon's cut uses only about 10% of the footage that Snyder shot. Composer Tom Holkenborg completed his film score before being replaced by Danny Elfman halfway through post-production. The scenes that Whedon wrote or re-shot for the theatrical release featured a brighter tone and more humour, and reduced the level of violence seen in Snyder's darker direction. To meet the mandated runtime, more than 90 minutes of Snyder's footage was removed, but the result still adhered to the basic outline of the story. While the initial cut was poorly received by test audiences, the early screening of Whedon's cut scored as high as Wonder Woman (2017), so Warner Bros. decided to move forward with it. Later in February 2021, an anonymous Warner Bros. executive stated that even the studio did not like the "stupefying" changes in Whedon's version, they were reluctant to criticize it and thus decided to proceed with it.

Justice League was released theatrically on November 17, 2017. Critics described it as a "Frankenstein" film, identifying it as the work of two different directors with competing visions. After seeing Whedon's version in late 2017, Deborah and executive producer Christopher Nolan advised Snyder to not watch it, knowing it would "break his heart." Justice League grossed $657.9 million against an estimated $300 million budget. Against an estimated break-even point of as much as $750 million, Deadline Hollywood estimated the film resulted in a net loss of $60 million for Warner Bros. Due to the film's poor performance, Warner Bros. decided to move away from Snyder's vision for a shared universe of interconnected films and focus on standalone films and solo franchises instead.

=== #ReleaseTheSnyderCut movement ===
After leaving the project, Snyder subsequently saved the rough version of his cut on a hard drive, which had not undergone the post-production process at the time. He kept it as a "memento," so that he could show people or for "snippets" of footage to be included in a documentary, as he thought his version would not be released. Snyder sent an editor in to retrieve materials related to the film on a hard drive. However, he was asked to return them as they were considered to be studio property, but refused to do so as he said it was his "personal use." Sources said that though security was notified, no action was taken as the studio did not expect Snyder would "begin tinkering with an alternate cut of the film."

Immediately after the theatrical release of Justice League, fans created an online petition to release the "Snyder Cut" that gained more than 100,000 signatures. The movement, which used the hashtag #ReleaseTheSnyderCut on social media, began before fans had any knowledge that Snyder's cut of Justice League actually existed. The movement had gained traction following the theatrical version's mixed reviews, with fans particularly disliking the film as they assumed Whedon created an inferior film. The circumstances were compared to that of Superman II (1980): Richard Donner was able to complete his version of the film, which was released as Superman II: The Richard Donner Cut in 2006. Commentators assumed an alternate cut of Justice League was inevitable as some of Snyder's previous films had been re-released in extended cuts for home media, such as Watchmen (2009) and Batman v Superman, which critics considered an improvement to the theatrical version.

Members of the Justice League cast and crew showing support for the Snyder Cut's release included actors Ben Affleck, Gal Gadot, Jason Momoa, Ciarán Hinds, and Ray Fisher, photographer Clay Enos, storyboard artist Jay Oliva, cinematographer Fabian Wagner, and Affleck's stunt double Richard Cetrone. Deborah said executive producers Nolan and Emma Thomas encouraged them to make the Snyder Cut. On the second anniversary of the theatrical release, the cast and crew voiced support through social media. Other film- and comic book-industry figures not related to Justice League also supported the release of a "Snyder Cut," including filmmakers Kevin Smith and Alan Taylor, television producer Steven S. DeKnight, and comic book writers Rob Liefeld, Robert Kirkman and Jerry Ordway. Members of the #ReleaseTheSnyderCut movement engaged in acts of fan activism to promote it, with a few fans even contacting Warner Bros. officials.

Following the death of Snyder's daughter and his departure from Justice League, fans from the #ReleaseTheSnyderCut movement soon began campaigns to raise money for suicide prevention; these campaigns raised over $500,000 for the American Foundation for Suicide Prevention (AFSP) in donations by February 2021. These efforts garnered praise from Snyder and the AFSP. Ahead of the 2019 San Diego Comic-Con, fans launched a crowdfunding campaign with half of the revenue to be spent for an advertising campaign consisting of billboards and a flying banner ad, while the other half was donated to the AFSP. For a similar campaign at the 2019 New York Comic Con, the movement purchased ad space on two billboards over Times Square featuring quotes from members of the cast and crew. That December, the movement rented another flying banner ad, this time passing over Warner Bros. Studios and directly asking Sarnoff to release the Snyder Cut. In January 2020, the movement bought four minutes of ad space advocating for the film's release on a digital banner wrapped around the interior of Riverside Stadium during the FA Cup.

==== Reactions ====
Shawn Robbins, chief analyst for Boxoffice Pro, suggested the size of the movement was too small to make an impact, opining that the film "doesn't seem to be something many outside the die-hard fan base are clamoring to see." Writer Mario F. Robles, based on his industry connections, said Warner Bros. did not trust Snyder's vision and was not willing to spend the money required for its completion. Throughout the movement, various media journalists referred to the Snyder Cut as "fabled" or "mythical."

Members of the movement have also been described by various journalists as "toxic" for harassing, threatening, and cyberbullying those who expressed contrary opinions about the Snyder Cut. Yohana Desta of Vanity Fair broadly described the act of fans demanding an alternative cut as a "modern pattern of audience demand that is actively making fandoms more toxic," comparing it to the harassment of Star Wars: The Last Jedi (2017) actress Kelly Marie Tran. Brandon Katz of The New York Observer said that the movement was composed of "both toxic DC fans that hurl vitriolic harassment at any and all opposition, and supportive moviegoers that genuinely enjoy Snyder's style and are just hoping to see the conclusion of his trilogy that began with 2013's Man of Steel. As with any contingent, there are both extremists and level-headed individuals in its ranks."

Bob Rehak, Swarthmore College Associate Professor and Chair of Film and Media Studies, said that fandoms such as #ReleaseTheSnyderCut react strongly when a major change is made to something they enjoy, and that this reaction usually comes from a smaller subsection of the fandom, which "[paints] the whole community with a really broad brush." In July 2022, Rolling Stone reported that WarnerMedia had discovered via internal investigations that approximately 13% of online activity relating to the Snyder Cut had been deemed "fake" and the result of Internet bot activities. Rolling Stone also spoke with more than 20 people involved with both versions of the film, most of whom believe that Snyder was "working to manipulate the ongoing campaign." In September 2018, former DC Entertainment president Diane Nelson deleted her Twitter account after substantial online harassment by members of the movement. Warner Bros. telephone operators, inundated with regular calls about the "Snyder Cut," were trained to treat them as prank calls.

=== Revival ===
By March 2019, Snyder stated that a cut of Justice League did exist and that it was Warner Bros.' decision to release it. That November, an insider claimed Warner Bros. was unlikely to release Snyder's cut, calling such hopes a "pipe dream." Snyder later confirmed by that December that his cut was approximately 214 minutes. Robert Greenblatt, then chairman of WarnerMedia and head of HBO Max, stated that discussions surrounding the release of Snyder's Justice League began in late 2019, and lasted a few months. He emphasized Snyder's cut was not finalized, and that Warner Bros. would have to fund its completion while also clarifying issues with film unions. The studio first approached Snyder to release his unfinished cut, but Snyder rejected the option and insisted on either completing or not releasing it, leading Warner Bros. to decide if they would proceed across the next few months. According to Snyder, WarnerMedia chose to release the Snyder Cut in February 2020, after chairman Toby Emmerich acknowledged the #ReleaseTheSnyderCut movement and contacted Snyder.

The Snyders invited executives from Warner Bros., HBO Max, and DC to their home to watch a then-assembled black and white version of the Snyder Cut. Snyder also proposed various ideas for its release, including releasing the cut in an episodic manner. Impressed, the executives decided to proceed with the project. Snyder began to collaborate with the film's original post-production team for completion. Despite the process being compromised by the then-ongoing COVID-19 pandemic, which was escalating around the time, the Snyders insisted on completing it. Snyder notified the original cast of the undertaking from April and May 2020; according to Snyder, he contacted Fisher first, who initially thought that Snyder was joking. On May 20, 2020, Snyder announced during a Q&A after an online watch party of Man of Steel that his cut of Justice League would be released as Zack Snyder's Justice League on HBO Max in 2021. Greenblatt said WarnerMedia tried to get the news out "as quickly as possible" before HBO Max launched on May 27.

Snyder described his cut as "an entirely new thing, and, especially talking to those who have seen the released movie, a new experience apart from that movie." The Snyders felt that being able to finally finish Justice League would bring them closure, and were excited by the prospect of expanding the film's character development. Greenblatt indicated its completion would be "wildly expensive" and estimated it would cost more than $30 million. In June 2020, Sandra Dewey, president of productions and business operations for WarnerMedia, stated in an interview that they are aiming for an "early to mid-2021" release. By January 2021, Snyder had completed his cut.

The announcement of Zack Snyder's Justice League was celebrated by the #ReleasetheSnyderCut movement, with many fans expressing their enthusiasm on social media. Some Snyder fans uploaded videos of them destroying their DVD and Blu-ray copies of the theatrical release. Many industry figures, such as cast members of Justice League, expressed their gratitude to the fans who supported the release of Snyder's version of the film. However, various journalists expressed concern that WarnerMedia was conceding to fans who engaged in forms of harassment and trolling during the movement, fearing it would set a negative precedent. Screen Rant opined that it gave the impression that similar methods of fan activism can influence film studios, networks, and streaming services. In response to this concern, HBO Max CEO Tony Goncalves affirmed the passion of the fandom and denied such claims, stating that as a business, they listen to the consumers' demand.

=== Additional filming ===
While initial reports indicated that no new material would be filmed, in September 2020, it was revealed that Snyder was preparing to film additional footage, with Affleck and Fisher reprising their roles. As a result, the budget was estimated to have increased to $70 million. Filming began on October 6. Later that month, Amber Heard, Jared Leto, and Joe Manganiello joined the cast to reprise their DCEU roles as Mera, the Joker, and Deathstroke, respectively. Henry Cavill later confirmed, though briefly considered, he would not film any additional material for his DCEU role Superman for the film, and any "new" scenes would just be previously unused footage removed from the theatrical cut. Snyder also directed an additional scene with Ezra Miller as Flash over Zoom, who was then filming Fantastic Beasts: The Secrets of Dumbledore (2022) in London. Snyder sent the film's crew drawings and diagrams of how he wanted the scene to look. His video feed played through a stand on a table, enabling him to direct Miller and the crew, who filmed the scene on his behalf. He estimated that only four to five minutes of footage was shot. Heard stated that filming for reshoots had wrapped by that December.

The final scene was originally filmed with John Stewart / Green Lantern portrayed by Wayne T. Carr, but Warner Bros. rejected it as they had other plans for the character. Previous variations of the scene included characters such as Kilowog with John Stewart, Kilowog with Tomar-Re, and Stewart with Martian Manhunter. Snyder opted to change Kilowog to Martian Manhunter, while rejecting the second idea during post-production in 2017. Ultimately, Snyder chose the third idea and filmed the scene in August 2020. Warner Bros. did not want Stewart to be in the scene, so Snyder decided to compromise with the studio and reshot the scene to only include Martian Manhunter by October 2020. He reshot Affleck's side of the scene as the previous footage was unusable due to lighting issues. Snyder originally wanted to include Ryan Reynolds, who previously portrayed Hal Jordan in Green Lantern (2011), as an "additional lantern... to fill out the corps a bit," but did not contact him.

=== Differences from the theatrical version ===
While the basic framework of the story is the same, numerous scenes that were removed by Joss Whedon are restored to expand upon the characters, mythos, and worldbuilding elements. Teases for upcoming films are also present in Snyder's version. Snyder's version does not use any of the scenes shot by Whedon for his version of Justice League. Former Warner Bros. executives Jon Berg and Geoff Johns, who oversaw the production for Whedon's version, had their credits removed for Snyder's.

Snyder stated that his version is not set in the same continuity as Whedon's, which would remain the canonical version of the film. However, Jason Momoa said that Aquaman (2018) takes place after Snyder's version, rather than Whedon's. Similarly, Wonder Woman director Patty Jenkins said that no DC director considers Whedon's Justice League canonical, and that she had worked with Snyder to ensure Wonder Woman maintained continuity with his film. Despite these sentiments, commentators noted various contradictions between Aquaman and Zack Snyder's Justice League relating to Mera's backstory. Additionally, The Flash (2023) acknowledges the events of Zack Snyder's Justice League.

=== Follow-up movements ===
Following the release of the film, fans expressed their appreciation on social media. Fans soon began a new movement, #RestoreTheSnyderverse, advocating for Warner Bros. to allow Snyder to complete his originally planned Justice League trilogy. Another movement, #ReleasetheAyerCut, also started trending as well, with fans advocating for Warner Bros. to release director David Ayer's original cut of Suicide Squad (2016). In July 2022, DC artist Jim Lee, who assisted Zack Snyder in the creation of the initial five-film plan, confirmed at San Diego Comic-Con that there were no plans to make more DC projects with Snyder or develop sequels to his Justice League cut.

== Music ==
Tom Holkenborg, also known as Junkie XL, composed the film's score; he had previously worked on the score for the theatrical version of Justice League, before being replaced by Danny Elfman following Snyder's departure and Whedon's arrival. When Holkenborg was rehired to score the film in early 2020, he decided to restart and make a brand new score for the film, which consists of fifty-four tracks and is three hours and 54 minutes long. The length of the score surpassed that of Ben-Hur (1959) by nearly a full hour, becoming the longest musical score in film history. Holkenborg described the score as "fully electronic [at times], and at other times fully orchestral," incorporating elements of rock and trap. The album was released via WaterTower Music on March 18, 2021, the same day as the film's release.

Two tracks from the film's score, "The Crew at Warpower," and "Middle Mass," were released as singles on February 17, 2021, and March 12, 2021, respectively. The soundtrack also makes use of a couple of songs; the beginning of the movie features a traditional Icelandic song "Vísur Vatnsenda-Rósu" by Yong Aus Galeson, while later scenes use the songs "Distant Sky" and "There Is a Kingdom" by Nick Cave and the Bad Seeds; none are included on the soundtrack. Allison Crowe's cover of the Leonard Cohen song "Hallelujah" plays during the end credits as a tribute to Autumn Snyder.

== Marketing ==
Alongside the announcement of Zack Snyder's Justice League, HBO released posters depicting the six members of the Justice League. Although these posters had previously been used for the 2017 marketing campaign, the HBO ones featured a black-and-white filter and strongly emphasized Snyder's name. Chris Agar of Screen Rant called the filter "a stark contrast from the colorful Justice League posters that were prevalent in the buildup to the theatrical release, which is most definitely an intentional choice to separate the two versions of the movie." Rolling Stone stated that film expenditures had risen from $73 million to over $100 million after accounting for marketing costs, indicating WB spent at least $27 million in marketing.

On August 22, 2020, the first teaser was released during the DC FanDome event, which featured a remix of the song "Hallelujah" (1984) by Leonard Cohen. It was considered to be a highly anticipated part of the event, and well received by audiences and critics. The trailer had leaked hours prior to its planned debut in the DC FanDome event. Julia Alexander, writing for The Verge, had remarked that those desiring a "more Snyder vibe to the film overall should be pleased," while Alex Abad-Santos of Vox observed the inclusion of scenes not included in the theatrical version, such as the death of Cyborg's father and Wonder Woman receiving the signal from the Amazons. Critics also enjoyed the presence of Darkseid, Superman's black suit, and the inclusion of Iris West's scenes, which was omitted in the theatrical version, in the trailer. In early November, the original teaser was temporarily removed from HBO Max's social platforms due to the expiration of the rights to "Hallelujah." On November 17, the third anniversary of the theatrical release, an updated version with new footage was uploaded in black and white on Snyder's Vero account and in color on HBO Max's social media accounts. In July 2023, the trailer was delisted from YouTube again after a music licensing issue. It had by then gained over 31 million views, making it Max's most-viewed trailer. (Note: The streaming service HBO Max rebranded itself as Max after it merged with Discovery+, which had begun its roll-out by May 2023.)

Warner Bros. also announced a tie-in meal kit product based on the design of the film's Mother Boxes and menu items inspired from the characters it had developed in collaboration with Wonderland Restaurants, a DC Comics-themed restaurant operating in London. On February 14, 2021, the first official trailer for the film released. Snyder had previously been releasing sneak peeks for the trailer on social media, including showing the Batmobile and Jared Leto's Joker. As such, Abigail Covington from Esquire had said that the trailer "expands on those earlier previews" and highlighting the action sequences, Darkseid, and Superman's black suit. Charles Holmes of The Ringer highlighted Leto's appearance as Joker in the trailer, particularly his line, "We live in a society," and felt that the trailer "doubles down" on Snyder's aesthetics, but was skeptical if the film would be superior to the theatrical version. On March 14, the final trailer for the film released, with Daniel Kreps at Rolling Stone writing that it featured "many of the hallmarks that made Snyder's version of the blockbuster so mythic in the first place." Two days later, DC published three variant covers of the film in the comic book issue, Justice League #59, written by Brian Michael Bendis, penciled and inked by David Marquez, and colored by Tamra Bonvillain. The covers were drawn by Lee Bermejo, Liam Sharp, and Jim Lee.

At the 2021 WarnerMedia Upfront, Warner Media declared the film was "a hit" Max original. Priya Dogra, president of WarnerMedia Entertainment Networks for Europe, the Middle East, Africa and Asia-Pacific stated the film to be a "global phenomenon" during a presentation for HBO Max Europe.

== Release ==
=== Streaming ===
Zack Snyder's Justice League was released on March 18, 2021, in the United States. It was initially going to be released on September 5, 2021. It is also available to stream on HBO Max in 4K, HDR in both HDR10 and Dolby Vision, and Dolby Atmos. Unlike the theatrical version which was rated PG-13, this version received an R rating for "violence and some language." Ten days prior to the scheduled debut of the film, HBO Max accidentally released the film to some viewers that were attempting to watch Tom and Jerry (2021). A week after the film's HBO Max release, the Justice Is Gray Edition was released on the platform, and in the UK through Sky Cinema on April 30.

The film was released internationally on several platforms: on HBO Go in select Asian countries; Binge in Australia; Crave in Canada; HBO services in select European countries; on digital services such as Amazon Prime Video and the iTunes Store in France; (Note: The film was originally scheduled to release on April 22, 2021, in France, but was later moved up to the simultaneous worldwide launch.) on KinoPoisk HD in Russia & CIS countries; digital services such as BookMyShow, Hungama Play, Tata Sky and the iTunes Store in India; Neon, Sky Go, and Sky Movies Premiere in New Zealand; and on Now and Sky Cinema in the United Kingdom. The film was also released on HBO Max in Latin America when the service launched on June 29, 2021.

=== Limited theatrical release ===
While the cut was originally planned to release as a four-part miniseries in addition to a single film, Snyder said on Vero in January 2021 that the cut would be released as a "one-shot." WarnerMedia later confirmed this in a press release, describing Zack Snyder's Justice League as a "full-length [HBO] Max Original feature film." The film is dedicated to Autumn Snyder's memory.

Snyder expressed his interest in screening his film in IMAX theaters once they were safe to re-open during the COVID-19 pandemic. A black and white version of the film, titled "Justice Is Gray Edition," had an exclusive theatrical release on July 19, 2022, with three IMAX screenings in New York City, Los Angeles, and Austin, Texas. Proceeds from the event were donated to a charity for the American Foundation for Suicide Prevention. For the theatrical release of the film, Snyder added a 10-minute intermission into the film accompanied by the score track "The Crew at Warpower." The film was released in an open matte 1.33:1 aspect ratio alongside IMAX 1.43:1. The film was screened in full color for the first time on IMAX on April 30, 2023, as the last film in a "Snyderverse Trilogy" three-day event to benefit suicide prevention.

=== Home media ===
The film was released May 24, 2021, on 4K Ultra HD, Blu-ray, and DVD in the United Kingdom. It was released on Ultra HD Blu-ray and Blu-ray in Hong Kong, Australia, Germany, and Italy on May 25, May 26, and May 27, 2021, respectively. A limited edition SteelBook was announced for the UK by HMV with pre-orders starting March 22. According to Warner Bros UK, pre-orders for the home media version sold out in the first 20 minutes of releases. It was released in the United States and Canada on September 7 on Blu-ray, DVD, and 4K, and a week later on those same platforms in Canada. The film was digitally released on July 19, 2022.

== Reception ==
=== Audience viewership ===
Following its opening weekend, view-tracking app Samba TV reported that 1.8 million American households had watched at least the first five minutes of the film between March 19–21 (only counting smart TVs, not devices). The total was behind the three-day total of DCEU film Wonder Woman 1984 (2.2 million). Samba TV also reported that just one-third of households watched the film in its entirety in a single sitting. Over its first full week of release, the film was watched by 2.2 million US households, with 792,000 (36%) finishing it in one sitting. Over the same timeframe, the HBO Max app was downloaded 64% more and opened 8.9% more than in an average week. Later, Samba TV reported that it was watched in 3.2 million households over the first 17 days and 3.7 million US households after 39 days.

In Canada, the film became the most-streamed content of all time on Crave, with 1.1 million viewers in one week. It also allegedly led to the service growing in subscribers by 12%. In the United Kingdom, where it is streaming via Sky Cinema, the film was viewed by 954,000 households, with 458,000 (48%) watching it in its entirety. In India, where it was released on BookMyShow Stream, about 100,000 homes watched the film in its first weekend. The film went on to become the most rented film of 2021 on that service. In Spain, the film became the 3rd most viewed release of 2021 on HBO Max España. In Germany, it ranked first during its first full week of release on Netflix and spent seven weeks in its weekly rankings for top 10 most-viewed films.

According to Whip Media, who track viewership data for the 19 million worldwide users of their TV Time app, the film was the eighth most-streamed-film of 2021. In January 2022, tech firm Akami reported that the film was the second most pirated film of 2021. Variety stated that the film was the fourth most-streamed film of 2021.

=== Home media sales ===
The film ranked first on the "NPD Videoscan First Alert" chart for home media sales in the United States during its first week, as well as in the Blu-ray sales. Overall, it sold five times more than the second-ranked The Conjuring: The Devil Made Me Do It. In addition, the trilogy consisting of all three DCEU films directed by Snyder was ranked fourteenth on the Blu-ray sales chart. According to The Numbers, the film sold 107,489 Blu-ray units and 33,820 DVD units in the first week for a revenue of $4.1 million. The Numbers reported the film had made an estimated $15.96 million from domestic video sales, as of May 29, 2022, with 439,547 Blu-rays and 92,599 DVDs sold.

In the second week, the film was ranked second in home media sales as well as the Blu-ray sales, being displaced by Black Widow, which outsold it by four times overall. It sold 71,682 units overall for $2 million according to The Numbers. By the end of September, it ranked third in overall disc sales according to NPD. After dropping to the 29th rank in overall disc sales and the 24th rank in Blu-ray sales by the ninth week, it returned to the top 10 rankings by acquiring the second position overall the next week amidst discounts offered ahead of Black Friday, while also selling the most number of Blu-ray units. According to The Numbers, it sold 51,027 Blu-ray units for $1.4 million during the week. In the United Kingdom, it ranked first on the Official Film Chart for five weeks. It was the second-highest-selling Blu-ray title of 2021 in the country, selling nearly 26,000 units during the year.

=== Critical response ===
On the review aggregator website Rotten Tomatoes, 71% of 314 reviews are positive, with an average rating of 6.7/10. The site's critical consensus reads, "Zack Snyder's Justice League lives up to its title with a sprawling cut that expands to fit the director's vision – and should satisfy the fans who willed it into existence." According to Metacritic, which calculated a weighted average score of 54 out of 100 based on 46 critics, the film received "mixed or average reviews." The scores of the film are higher on both sites than what the 2017 film received (39% and 45, respectively).

According to The Hollywood Reporter, critics praised Snyder's direction and characterization, but criticized the film's length. Variety later noted that most critics felt the film was superior to the 2017 version, a sentiment The Hollywood Reporter and TheWrap also agreed with. However, Total Film reported that critical response to the film was mixed, with critics being "divided" on whether or not it was superior to the theatrical version. Rob Harvilla of The Ringer felt that the film is "A Zack Snyder film that 'critics enjoyed', or at least 'grudgingly appreciated'." He further opined both fans and critics "respect" the film due to the nature of its existence.

Robbie Collin of The Daily Telegraph awarded the film a full five stars, praising Holkenborg's score, action sequences, and characterization, which he felt was superior to the original. Collin went on to opine that Snyder's creative vision for the DCEU had felt unique. Jenna Anderson from ComicBook.com, who rated the film a 4.5 out of 5, also praised the increased characterization, performances, and Snyder's filmmaking techniques, believing Snyder created the film out of love for both his daughter and fans. She went on to describe it as being "well-executed, entertaining story about the power of human connection and inspiration, one that feels both timeless and timely." Writing for Variety, Owen Gleiberman enjoyed Snyder's direction, which he felt "exudes a majestic sense of cosmic historical evil," and compared it to Peter Jackson's Lord of the Rings trilogy (2001–2003), in addition to highlighting the visuals and the characterization. Gleiberman and Variety's Peter Debruge later ranked it as the eighth best film of 2021. Matt Zoller Seitz from RogerEbert.com, who gave it a 3.5 out of 4, felt the film was superior to the theatrical version, and described Snyder's vision as being a "brazen auteurist vision." Though he felt many scenes were protracted, he also felt it was used to improve characterization and create a "sense of space and place."

Tom Jorgensen of IGN gave the film an 8 out of 10 rating, calling it a "vindication" for Snyder's vision, and like Seitz, maintained the extended runtime allowed for further development of its lore and characters. He particularly enjoyed the extended characterization, feeling "Nearly every character in Zack Snyder's Justice League, from the top down, has a clearer journey and more dimension." Mick LaSalle, for the San Francisco Chronicle, gave the film a positive review, agreeing the increased runtime improved characterization and emphasizing his belief it was superior to the theatrical version. He concluded that it "may not be a great film, but it has the madness, strangeness and obsessiveness of a real work of art." In a more critical review, Bilge Ebiri of Vulture wrote the film "contains the best and worst of Zack Snyder," noting its existence as being a personal endeavor for Snyder. Ebiri's opinion on Cyborg's character arc was mixed: he thought Cyborg's character consisted of "broad, basic emotions" but also called it the "best stuff in the film." He mainly criticized the action – feeling it was overreliant on computer-generated imagery (CGI) and slow motion rather than practical effects – and story, calling it "least interesting part."

The Hollywood Reporter's John DeFore gave the film a negative review. Though he acknowledged that the plot, tone, and visual effects were superior to the theatrical version, he criticized the runtime and dialogue, opining that it "largely maintains a testosterocious monotony from its first chapter." Writing for The New Yorker, Richard Brody also disliked the runtime, deeming it to contain scenes "chopped down to a bare informational minimum, leaving no room for thought or emotion." Additionally, he disapproved of the visual effects and characterization, perceiving it as "trivialization, manipulation, and deformation of the sincere and serious emotions that undergird and motivate its cast of heroes." While Richard Trenholm, writing for CNET, praised the performances, he described the film as "bloated," feeling there were many redundant scenes and perceived the tone to be overly serious. In a 1.5/4 star review for The New York Observer, Siddhant Adlakha wrote that "the film's improvements are hardly enough to fix what was, now quite apparently, a flawed endeavor from the start." The BBC's Mark Kermode described the film as "turgid and bloated," further deeming the director's cut "uniformly boring as opposed to before when it was fractured and disjointed boring. Hannah Strong of Little White Lies gave a 2 out of 5 rating, concluding that it "is overlong, miserable and signifies nothing other than the potential of fandom to influence top-level creative decision-making."

=== Accolades ===
In February 2022, the film was named one of the five finalists for the new Oscars Cheer Moment Twitter Sweepstakes as part of the Academy of Motion Picture Arts and Sciences' "Oscars Fan Favorite." The scene "The Flash Enters the Speed Force" finished in the first place.

Award	Date of ceremony	Category	Recipient(s)	Result	Ref.
AEAF Awards	May 21, 2021	Feature Film – VFX	Special Merit for Weta Digital	Won	
Clio Awards	December 19, 2021	Clio Entertainment 2021 Silver Winner	Mother Box Origins, yU+co	Won	
Critics' Choice Super Awards	March 17, 2022	Best Superhero Movie	Zack Snyder's Justice League	Nominated	
Critics' Choice Super Awards	March 17, 2022	Best Actress in a Superhero Movie	Gal Gadot	Nominated	
Dragon Awards	September 5, 2021	Best Science Fiction or Fantasy Movie	Zack Snyder's Justice League (as Justice League)	Nominated	
Golden Trailer Awards	July 22, 2021	Best Action Poster	Zack Snyder's Justice League Key Art, HBO Max, Gravillis	Nominated	
Golden Trailer Awards	July 22, 2021	Best Wildposts	Zack Snyder's Justice League Character Art, HBO Max, Gravillis	Won	
MTV Movie & TV Awards	May 16, 2021	Best Fight	"Final Fight vs. Steppenwolf" – Zack Snyder's Justice League	Nominated	

== See also ==
- Superman II: The Richard Donner Cut
