= Silas Stone =

Fictional character appearing in DC Comics

Publication information
- Publisher: DC Comics
- First appearance: DC Comics Presents #26 (October 1980)
- Created by: Marv Wolfman; George Pérez

In-story information
- Species: Human
- Team affiliations: S.T.A.R. Labs; Teen Titans
- Abilities: Genius-level intellect

Silas Stone is a character appearing in American comic books published by DC Comics. He is the father of Cyborg and the creator of Titans Tower. Silas Stone first appeared in DC Comics Presents #26 and was created by Marv Wolfman and George Pérez.

Silas Stone has been featured in several adaptations, first appearing in several animated series. Actor Joe Morton portrayed the character in the DC Extended Universe films Batman v Superman: Dawn of Justice, Justice League, and its director's cut Zack Snyder's Justice League. Phil Morris portrays the character in the Doom Patrol television series on DC Universe and HBO Max.

== Fictional character biography ==
=== Pre-Crisis ===
Silas Stone is a scientist who formerly worked at S.T.A.R. Labs and is the father of Victor Stone. When Victor was in high school, he was mauled by an alien creature that emerged from an interdimensional portal at S.T.A.R. Labs, forcing Silas to convert Victor into a cyborg to save his life. Victor comes to resent Silas due to his transformation, which Silas attempts to mend by building Titans Tower for the Teen Titans.

Years later, Silas is terminally ill with radiation poisoning caused by energy from the dimensional portal; however, he manages to reconcile with Victor before dying.

=== The New 52 ===
Silas Stone is resurrected following the 2011 relaunch "The New 52", which rebooted the continuity of the DC universe. This version of Silas is a scientist at S.T.A.R. Labs in Detroit. He is studying a mysterious box when he is informed of the arrival of his son Victor, who attempts to tell him about the scholarships that he received. Silas states that Victor does not need a scholarship as he is already paying for his school, which leads to the two arguing. The box in the Justice League's possession and the box at S.T.A.R. Labs are activated, which leads to a horde of Parademons emerging and wounding Victor. Silas takes Victor to a secure room, where he is outfitted with experimental technology and briefly goes into cardiac arrest. Silas realizes that Victor is alive when he starts speaking in binary code, indicating that his repaired body is now online. When Victor awakens, he defends his father from the invading Parademons.

In Dawn of DC, Silas is revealed to have died with his consciousness being transferred into a robotic body. He later sacrifices himself to help Cyborg stop the robot Solace.

== Powers and abilities ==
Silas Stone has genius-level intellect.

== In other media ==
=== Television ===
- Silas Stone appears in Young Justice, voiced by Khary Payton. Silas was previously entrusted with studying a Father Box, which he uses to save Victor after he is mortally wounded by a Reach failsafe device. Victor blames Silas for ruining his life before they eventually reconcile.
- Silas Stone appears in Doom Patrol, portrayed by Phil Morris. This version was convinced by the Chief to save his son Victor over his wife.
- Silas Stone appears in My Adventures with Superman, voiced by Byron Marc Newsome. This version is a scientist at AmerTek Industries until he is fired by Thomas Weston for speaking out against the company's fusion reactor.

=== Film ===
- Silas Stone appears in the DC Animated Movie Universe films Justice League: War and The Death of Superman, voiced by Rocky Carroll.
- An alternate reality version of Silas Stone appears in Justice League: Gods and Monsters, voiced by Carl Lumbly. This version is a member of Lex Luthor's Project Fair Play, a weapons contingency program meant to counter their universe's Justice League if necessary. Silas is enlisted by Superman to unlock data from the latter's spaceship before he and his son Victor are attacked and killed by a Metal Man designed to frame Superman.
- Silas Stone appears in Batman Unlimited: Monster Mayhem, voiced by Cedric Yarbrough.
- Silas Stone appears in the films set in the DC Extended Universe, portrayed by Joe Morton.
  - Silas first appears in Batman v Superman: Dawn of Justice, in which he experiments on and converts his son Victor Stone into Cyborg using a Mother Box.
  - Silas also appears in Justice League, in which he and other scientists are captured by Steppenwolf due to their connection to a Mother Box. After the Justice League rescue him, Silas bonds with Victor while upgrading his body.
    - In the director's cut, Zack Snyder's Justice League, Silas is killed while remotely activating a Mother Box.

=== Video games ===
Silas Stone appears in Scribblenauts Unmasked: A DC Comics Adventure.
