= Diana Prince (DC Extended Universe) =

DC Extended Universe character

- DC Extended Universe character
- Promotional image of Gal Gadot as Wonder Woman in Batman v Superman: Dawn of Justice (2016)
- First appearance: Batman v Superman: Dawn of Justice (2016)
- Last appearance: The Flash (2023)
- Based on: Wonder Woman by: William Moulton Marston; H. G. Peter
- Adapted by: Chris Terrio; David S. Goyer; Zack Snyder; Allan Heinberg; Jason Fuchs
- Portrayed by: Gal Gadot; Emily Carey (12 years old); Lilly Aspell (8 years old)

In-universe information
- Full name: Princess Diana of Themyscira (birth name); Diana Prince (civilian name)
- Alias: Wonder Woman
- Species: Amazon–Old God hybrid
- Gender: Female
- Title: Crown Princess of Themyscira
- Occupation: Museum Curator; Warrior; Vigilante
- Affiliation: Amazons; Smithsonian Institution; Louvre Museum; Justice League
- Family: Zeus (father); Hippolyta (mother); Ares (half-brother); Atlas (grand-uncle); Antheia, Kalypso, and Hespera (first cousins-once-removed)
- Significant other: Steve Trevor

Princess Diana of Themyscira, also known by her civilian name Diana Prince or her superhero title Wonder Woman, is a fictional character in the DC Extended Universe (DCEU), based on the DC Comics character of the same name created by William Moulton Marston and H. G. Peter. First appearing in Batman v Superman: Dawn of Justice, she is portrayed by Gal Gadot and later plays a major role in the films Wonder Woman, Justice League (and its 2021 director's cut), and Wonder Woman 1984, along with cameo appearances in Shazam! Fury of the Gods and The Flash.

Gadot's performance as Wonder Woman, the first live-action portrayal of the character in cinema, has received critical praise, beginning with her debut in Batman v Superman, where she was considered a highlight. Her performance in Wonder Woman was especially praised for its warmth, optimism, and chemistry with her co-stars. However, political backlash in some Arab countries led to bans due to Gadot's Israeli background. Her role in Justice League faced criticism for being minimized and objectified, though Zack Snyder's version received more positive feedback.

== Fictional character biography ==
=== Themysciran days ===
Diana was born to Queen Hippolyta around 3000 BC on the hidden island of Themyscira, home to the Amazons, women warriors created by Zeus to protect mankind. Hippolyta explains their history to Diana, including how Ares became jealous of humanity and orchestrated its destruction. When the other gods attempted to stop him, Ares killed all but Zeus, who used the last of his power to wound Ares and force his retreat. Before dying, Zeus left the Amazons a weapon, the "Godkiller", to prepare them for Ares's return. Hippolyta reluctantly agrees to let her sister, General Antiope, train Diana as a warrior. (Note: As depicted in the flashbacks of the 2017 film Wonder Woman.)

At age 8, Diana competes in a race during an Amazonian sporting event. She uses a shortcut to the finish line, but is caught by Antiope. Hippolyta teaches Diana about the harmful effects of cheating and the importance of patience, for her time to be a hero will come someday. (Note: As depicted in the opening scene of the 2020 film Wonder Woman 1984.)

=== Foray into World War I ===
In 1918, Diana, now a young woman, rescues Captain Steve Trevor, a pilot with the American Expeditionary Forces, after his plane crashes off the coast of Themyscira. The island is soon invaded by the landing party of a German cruiser pursuing Trevor. The Amazons engage and kill all the German sailors, but Antiope dies intercepting a German bullet meant for Diana. Interrogated with the Lasso of Hestia, Trevor reveals that World War I is raging in the outside world and that he is an Allied spy. He stole a notebook with valuable information from the Spanish chief chemist Isabel Maru, who is attempting to engineer a deadlier form of mustard gas under the orders of General Erich Ludendorff. Believing Ares is responsible for the war, Diana arms herself with the "Godkiller" sword, a shield, the Lasso of Hestia, and her suit of armor and sets out on her own, in defiance of her mother, to stop Ares and end the war. She releases Trevor and immediately leaves Themyscira with him to find and destroy Ares.

The two arrive in London, and Diana is introduced to Etta Candy, Trevor's secretary. She helps Diana acquire some contemporary clothing so she can better fit in and retain her anonymity. Trevor and Diana deliver Maru's notebook to the Supreme War Council, where Patrick Morgan is negotiating an armistice with Germany. Diana translates Maru's notes, revealing that the Germans plan to release the deadly gas at the Western Front. Although forbidden by his commander to act, Trevor, with secret funding from Morgan, recruits Moroccan spy Sameer, Scottish marksman Charlie, and Native American smuggler Chief Napi to help prevent the gas from being released. Diana adopts the surname "Prince" to fit in better at Trevor's suggestion. As the group approaches the trenches, Prince, unwilling to see the civilians suffer, charges into no man's land and liberates the nearby village of Veld with the aid of the group and Allied forces. The team briefly celebrates, taking a photograph in the village, where Prince and Trevor fall in love.

The following morning, Prince ignores Trevor's advice to remain with Charlie and Napi and scouts out the surrounding area. She also enters the castle after incapacitating an aristocratic German woman and stealing her gown as a disguise. She meets Ludendorff, whom she assumes to be the mortal disguise of Ares, and plans to kill him before Steve intervenes and prevents her from doing so, fearful that their covers would be blown and result in their deaths too.

Ludendorff then fires the new gas at the battle lines from an artillery gun at the castle houses. Horrified by the result of the gas, Prince blames Trevor for letting it happen as a result of letting Ludendorff live. Prince confronts and fights Ludendorff, who bolsters his own strength by consuming an elixir procured by Maru. She kills him, but is confused and disillusioned when his death does not stop the war.

Morgan appears and reveals himself as Ares. When Prince attempts to kill Ares with the "Godkiller" sword, he destroys it, telling Diana that, as the daughter of Zeus and Hippolyta, she herself is the "Godkiller". He entreats her to help him destroy mankind in order to restore paradise on Earth, but she refuses. Ares attempts to channel Prince's rage and grief over Trevor's death by convincing her to kill Maru, but the memories of her experiences with Trevor lead her to realize that humans have good within them. She spares Maru and redirects Ares' lightning into him, destroying him for good.

=== Cold War ===
In 1984, Diana works at the Smithsonian Museum as an archaeologist under the alias of "Diana Prince" while moonlighting as Wonder Woman. With her new co-worker, Barbara Ann Minerva, becoming envious of Diana. Barbara and Diana help the FBI identify some antiques stolen from a heist foiled by Wonder Woman, noticing that one item, the Dreamstone, contains a Latin inscription claiming to grant the holder one wish. Barbara wishes to become like Diana, but acquires the same superpowers, while Diana unknowingly wishes for Steve Trevor to be alive again, which resurrects him in another man's body; the two are reunited at a Smithsonian gala. However, only Diana can see him as Steve. While in Cairo, Egypt, Diana and Steve tried to get Max Lord to hand the stone back to them after learning that the stone was actually created and empowered by the gods, with Diana claiming that "the power of the stone is too much for Max Lord to handle." After a battle between Wonder Woman and the Emir's armed security team, who now work for Max Lord, Diana gets wounded by a gunshot before Max Lord gets away. Diana phones Barbara to find out where exactly that stone came from and the next morning, Barbara, Diana, and "Steve" discover that the Dreamstone was created and empowered by Dolos/Mendacius, the god of lies, treachery, deception, and mischief, also known as Duke of Deception. It grants a user's wish while exacting a toll, which explains why Diana got wounded in the battle because the stone was taking away her powers, unless they renounce the wish or destroy the stone.

Learning from the U.S. President of a satellite system that broadcasts signals globally, Maxwell Lord, whose powers are causing his body to deteriorate, plans to grant wishes globally to steal strength and life force from the viewers and regain his health. Diana and Steve confront him at the White House, but Minerva, now aligned with Lord, defeats Prince, escaping with Lord on Marine One. Renouncing her wish and releasing Steve, Diana dons the armor of Asteria and battles Barbara, who has transformed into a cheetah-like creature. Following a brutal match, Diana tackles Cheetah into a lake and electrocutes her, then pulls her out.

She confronts Max Lord and uses her Lasso of Truth to communicate with the world through him, convincing everyone to renounce their wishes, then shows Max visions of his own unhappy childhood and of his son, Alistair, who is frantically searching for his father amid the chaos. Max renounces his wish and reunites with Alistair. On Christmas, Diana meets the man whose body Trevor possessed, and then she is shown flying in the clouds before going to supposedly stop a crime after hearing police sirens wail in the distance.

=== The Trinity ===
In 2015, Diana is invited to a gala by Lex Luthor where Bruce Wayne encounters her. They are both after encrypted information from Luthor's system, with Diana snagging a decryption device that Wayne plants, but when Diana is unable to extract data from the device, she hands it over to Wayne, who later finds that the files contain information on metahumans, one of which turns out to be Diana.

Upon hearing Superman and Batman's fight with Doomsday in Gotham City, Diana abandons a flight back to her job in France and joins the two heroes in their fight against the monster. Wonder Woman slices off the creature's hand and restrains it using her lasso as Batman stuns it, allowing Superman to kill the monster using a kryptonite spear at the cost of his own life. Moved by Superman's sacrifice, Prince later attends his funeral with Wayne, who invites her to help him recruit other metahumans to band together.

=== Remembering the Past ===
Sometime later, Wayne follows up with Prince, sending her a package containing a personal note and the photographic plate from 1918 depicting her with Trevor and the other World War I fighters, which Luthor had previously used in an attempt to blackmail her. (Note: As depicted in the 2016 film Batman v Superman: Dawn of Justice.) Prince reminisces on her past while looking at the package. She sends an email to Wayne thanking him for retrieving the photographic plate of her and Trevor. (Note: As depicted in the opening and end scenes of the 2017 film Wonder Woman.)

=== Forming the Justice League ===
==== Theatrical cut ====
In 2017, Wonder Woman stops a terrorist bomb plot at the Old Bailey in London. Seeing a news report that features a signal fire burning at the Shrine of the Amazons in Greece, Prince realizes that her mother had sent a message from Themyscira to warn her of an impending invasion. She then meets with Wayne in Gotham, explaining the history of the first invasion of Earth by the forces of Apokolips. While Wayne goes after Arthur Curry and Barry Allen, Prince tracks down the elusive Victor Stone.

Stone is initially hesitant about joining the team despite providing some intel to Prince, but later joins when Steppenwolf kidnaps his father and several other S.T.A.R. Labs employees in an attempt to retrieve the last Mother Box. The team rescues the employees and takes the last Mother Box during the skirmish before Aquaman arrives and saves them from a deluge of floodwater. Realizing the potential of the Mother Box, Wayne decides to have the team use it to resurrect Superman, whereas Prince and Curry express skepticism. Allen and Stone exhume Clark Kent's body and the team successfully resurrects him in the facility used to create Doomsday, but Superman, having lost his memories, attacks the group after Cyborg accidentally launches a missile at him. In the skirmish, Steppenwolf takes the last Mother Box from the group as it was left unattended. As Superman leaves with Lois to regain his memories, the five other heroes recuperate at the Batcave. Prince tends to Wayne's wounds as the two apologize for some harsh words towards each other earlier.

==== Director's cut ====
Wonder Woman calms down the school girls held hostage by the terrorist group in London and explores the tunnels underneath the Shrine of the Amazons to find imagery of the first invasion of Earth by Apokolips, led by Darkseid. She votes in favor of resurrecting Superman in addition to joining Allen and Stone along with Curry in digging up Clark Kent's corpse. Prince and Curry talk about the historical rivalry between the Amazons and Atlanteans, dismissing it while finding they have more in common than expected.

She is shown to be on-par with Steppenwolf in terms of melee-fighting prowess, though he manipulates her emotions by falsely claiming he killed her mother. After Superman overpowers Steppenwolf and Aquaman impales him following the separation of the Mother Boxes, Wonder Woman lands the killing blow, decapitating the New God after Superman throws him back into the boom tube, with his disembodied head and corpse landing at Darkseid's feet back on Apokolips. Following the team's victory, Prince and Wayne decide to expand the operations of the team, starting by rebuilding Wayne's old manor into their headquarters. Diana is last seen looking towards Themyscira as she contemplates about her fellow Amazons.

=== Butterfly invasion ===
In 2021, Prince, alongside The Flash, Superman and Aquaman are summoned by Amanda Waller to assist the vigilante Peacemaker in fighting a group of parasitic aliens named The Butterflies, but the team arrives too late to help. Peacemaker claims to have met Prince at a party.

=== Meeting Shazam ===
Shortly after, Prince, who is aware of Billy Batson / Shazam and what he had been through, arrives in Mount Olympus and restores the Wizard's staff imbuing it with her powers. She then uses it to restore Billy to life. Afterwards, she departs from them.

=== Fighting Al Falcone ===
Soon after, Prince, who appears to save Batman and Alberto Falcone with her Lasso of Truth, encounters Flash, who is also tied up. Prince is nowhere to be found when Allen alters the universe after saving his mother, although he later undoes most of his changes after realizing the consequences of saving his mother.

== Alternate versions ==
=== Steppenwolf victorious ===
In Zack Snyder's Justice League, Diana and the rest of the Justice League are killed by the unity of the Mother Boxes. This version of events is erased after Barry Allen enters the Speed Force and reverses time.

=== Knightmare reality ===
In Zack Snyder's Justice League, in visions received by Victor of a reality where Darkseid is victorious, Diana is killed in battle during Darkseid's takeover of Earth and is cremated by the Amazons, with parademons all around them.

== Development and portrayal ==
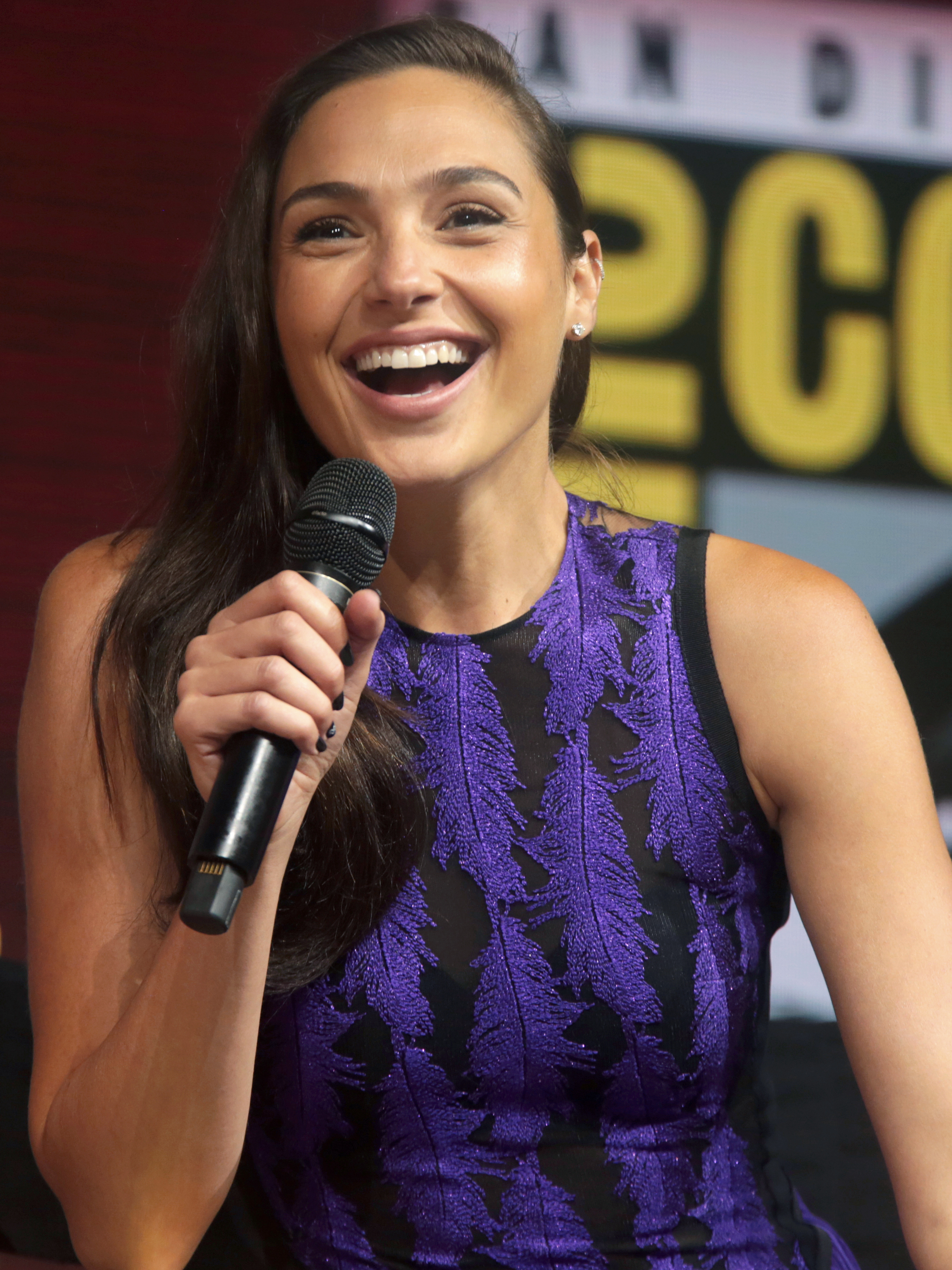
On casting Gal Gadot as Wonder Woman, director Zack Snyder mentioned that Gadot had "that magical quality that makes her perfect for the role."

Despite being one of DC Comics' flagship superhero characters, Wonder Woman had not been portrayed in live-action film until Batman v Superman: Dawn of Justice in 2016. The character was the subject of the television series Wonder Woman, which ran from 1975 to 1979 with Lynda Carter portraying the title character. Prior to that, a loosely-based television film with the same name was released in 1974 with Cathy Lee Crosby portraying a different version of Wonder Woman. However, the character has been featured in Justice League and Justice League Unlimited shows in the DC Animated Universe and movies in DC Universe Animated Original Movies line, and also appeared in The Lego Movie with Cobie Smulders providing her voice.

Development of a live-action Wonder Woman film began as far back as 1996, with producers and screenwriters such as Ivan Reitman, Jon Cohen, Joel Silver, Todd Alcott, Leonard Goldberg, and Joss Whedon attached to the project. Actresses such as Sandra Bullock, Mariah Carey, Catherine Zeta-Jones and Lucy Lawless were rumored or approached to take on the title role. A film focusing on Wonder Woman during World War II impressed the heads at Silver Pictures, but Silver did not want the film to be a period piece, despite purchasing the script to prevent the cinematic rights of Wonder Woman reverting.

By 2013, with Warner Bros. releasing Man of Steel, the studio had opened up the idea of that film creating a shared cinematic universe to compete with one set up by Marvel Comics. In addition to proven characters such as Superman and Batman, the studio once again put Wonder Woman in consideration for adaptation, along with other characters such as Aquaman. DC Entertainment president Diane Nelson said Wonder Woman "has been, since I started, one of the top three priorities for DC and for Warner Bros. We are still trying right now, but she's tricky."

=== Casting ===
Israeli actress Gal Gadot was cast as Diana Prince/Wonder Woman for Batman v Superman: Dawn of Justice by director Zack Snyder, having previously turned down the role of Faora-Ul in Man of Steel due to pregnancy. According to Empire, Gadot won the role after screen-testing with Batman actor Ben Affleck against four other actresses. Like Affleck, Gadot's casting was initially not well received, as many had considered her too "slender" for the role of Wonder Woman. In preparation for the role, Gadot underwent a diet and training regimen, practiced different martial arts and gained 17 pounds of muscle.

On Gadot's casting as Wonder Woman, Snyder said "Wonder Woman is arguably one of the most powerful female characters of all time and a fan favorite in the DC Universe. Not only is Gal an amazing actress, but she also has that magical quality that makes her perfect for the role." In 2015, Patty Jenkins accepted an offer to direct Wonder Woman, based on a screenplay by Allan Heinberg and a story co-written by Heinberg, Zack Snyder, Geoff Johns and Jason Fuchs. Jenkins worked with Gadot on the Wonder Woman film, which eventually was conceived as a prequel to Wonder Woman's first appearance in Batman v Superman, placing her in the 1910s and World War I (a decision which differs from her comic book origins as a supporter of the Allies during World War II).

After lukewarm reception to Wonder Woman 1984, a third DCEU Wonder Woman film with Jenkins directing and Gadot starring had been under development, but after James Gunn and Peter Safran became the new heads of the renamed DC Studios, Jenkins' plans were abandoned by Gunn and Safran as that film did not fit into their plans for what would become the DC Universe, which will effectively be a reboot of the DCEU. However, the duo offered to let Gadot stay on as Wonder Woman in the new timeline despite confirming that Henry Cavill and Ben Affleck would not portray the DCU's new iterations of Superman and Batman, respectively. Eventually, it was later reported by Variety in October 2023 that none of the DCEU actors cast for Snyder's films would be reprising their respective roles in the DCU, including Gadot as Wonder Woman. Despite the cancellation of the planned third film, Gadot had already shot cameos for both Shazam! Fury of the Gods and The Flash films during both productions between the months of March and September in 2021. They were scheduled to be released as the final wave of completed films for the DCEU before the DCEU continuity was "reset" with The Flash, and Gadot appeared in both films as planned, marking her final outings as Wonder Woman in 2023.

==== Justice League reshoots controversy ====
Years after the release of the theatrical version of Justice League, Gal Gadot revealed that she was uncomfortable shooting several scenes during the reshoots, refusing to film the shot of Barry Allen slipping and falling on Wonder Woman's chest during the battle under Gotham Harbor and utilizing a body double instead. This and replacement director Joss Whedon's reported on-set behavior led to a dispute, with Whedon allegedly threatening to make Gadot's career "miserable," but after she promptly reported Whedon to studio executives, the situation was "taken care of." Gadot was one of several actors in the film, including Affleck, Cyborg actor Ray Fisher, Aquaman actor Jason Momoa, and Iris West actress Kiersey Clemons, to voice complaints about working with Whedon during the reshoots.

Zack Snyder's Justice League, the director's cut of the film, omits scenes added in the theatrical cut that have arguably objectified the character, including the controversial scene with Barry Allen. Overall, while many of Diana's scenes are similar between the two versions of the film, several of Diana's lines and nuances are given different contexts, and the director's cut of the film displays her fighting skills more in-depth than the theatrical cut.

"You know Wonder Woman; she's amazing. I love everything that she represents and everything that she stands for. She's all about love and compassion and truth and justice and equality, and she's a whole lot of woman. For me, it was important that people can relate to her."

— Gal Gadot on her thoughts on portraying Wonder Woman

=== Characterization and themes ===
Possessing superhuman abilities and widely regarded as one of the world's strongest heroes, Diana is depicted as compassionate and strong-willed, gradually gaining experience after leaving her homeland to live among humanity. Influenced by her upbringing among the Amazons, she advocates for equality and seeks to protect humanity through peaceful cooperation. Alongside her empathic nature, she is shown appreciating everyday experiences, such as trying ice cream for the first time in Wonder Woman and encouraging SUperman to recoraging the positive impact of their victory over Steppenwolf in Justice League. Despite her peaceful ideals, DIana remains a trained warrior who aggresive and uncompromising when her allies are harmed.

Despite Steve Trevor being Wonder Woman's primary love interest as with the comics, a mutual interest between Diana and Bruce Wayne / Batman has been hinted at in the films, with critics noting their chemistry.

Gadot describes her character as having "many strengths and powers, but at the end of the day, she's a woman with a lot of emotional intelligence". Describing Wonder Woman's compassion, Gadot stated, "It's all her heart—that's her strength. I think women are amazing for being able to show what they feel. I admire women who do." Gadot also stated "I don't want people to think she is perfect", further explaining, "She can be naughty." On Diana leaving Themyscira, a mystical island inhabited only by females, and going to the world in Wonder Woman, Gadot stated "When Diana comes to the real world she's completely oblivious about gender and society rules, that women are not equal to men."

Describing her role in Batman v Superman, Gadot said, "In this movie you get a glimpse of who Wonder Woman is — she's being introduced into this DC Comics universe. But we were talking about her strengths, her façade, her attitude. Why is she acting the way she is?" On Wonder Woman's battle scene with Doomsday, Gadot stated, "I remember after we did that take, Zack came to me and he said, 'Did you just have a smirk?' I said, 'Yeah.' And he asked, 'Why? I think I like it, but why?' 'Well, if he's gonna mess with her, then she's gonna mess with him. And she knows she's gonna win.' At the end of the day, Wonder Woman is a peace seeker. But when fight arrives, she can fight. She's a warrior and she enjoys the adrenaline of the fight."

==== Armor and equipment ====
Diana's armor starting in Batman v Superman: Dawn of Justice consists of a red armored bustier, blue leather gladiator skirt, tiara, and knee-high boots with high heels, and has inspired the redesign of the mainline comics version of Wonder Woman after DC Rebirth. Along with her bracelets, which act as bracers producing pure concussive force, and lasso, Diana fights with a sword and shield in all her film appearances aside from Wonder Woman 1984. The sword itself in Batman v Superman is inscribed with a quote from Joseph Campbell, chosen by Zack Snyder: "Life is killing life all the time and so the goddess kills herself in the sacrifice of her own animal."

The armor and that of the other Amazons was designed to emphasize their nature as warriors, but with femininity also in mind, according to Wonder Woman director Patty Jenkins and costume designer Lindy Hemming. Jenkins elaborates, "To me, they shouldn't be dressed in armor like men. It should be different. It should be authentic and real ... and appealing to women." When asked about the decision to give the Amazons heeled sandals, Jenkins explained that they also have flats for fighting, adding "It's total wish-fulfillment ... I, as a woman, want Wonder Woman to be sexy, hot as hell, fight badass, and look great at the same time ... the same way men want Superman to have ridiculously huge pecs and an impractically big body. That makes them feel like the hero they want to be. And my hero, in my head, has really long legs."

== Other appearances ==
=== Shazam! ===
In the animated end credits sequence in the 2019 film Shazam!, Wonder Woman was seen punching a subdued villain before riding in the Batmobile with Shazam.

=== Advertising ===
Clips of Gadot as Wonder Woman as seen in Wonder Woman 1984 are featured in a 2021 DirecTV advertisement along with professional tennis player Serena Williams, with Williams being inserted into the film dressed as Wonder Woman after a customer inadvertently merges the two figures on his television screen.

=== Video games ===
Gadot's Wonder Woman appears as skins in mobile versions of the video games Injustice: Gods Among Us and Injustice 2. She is also featured as a character in the DC Movie Pack for Lego DC Super-Villains.

== Reception ==
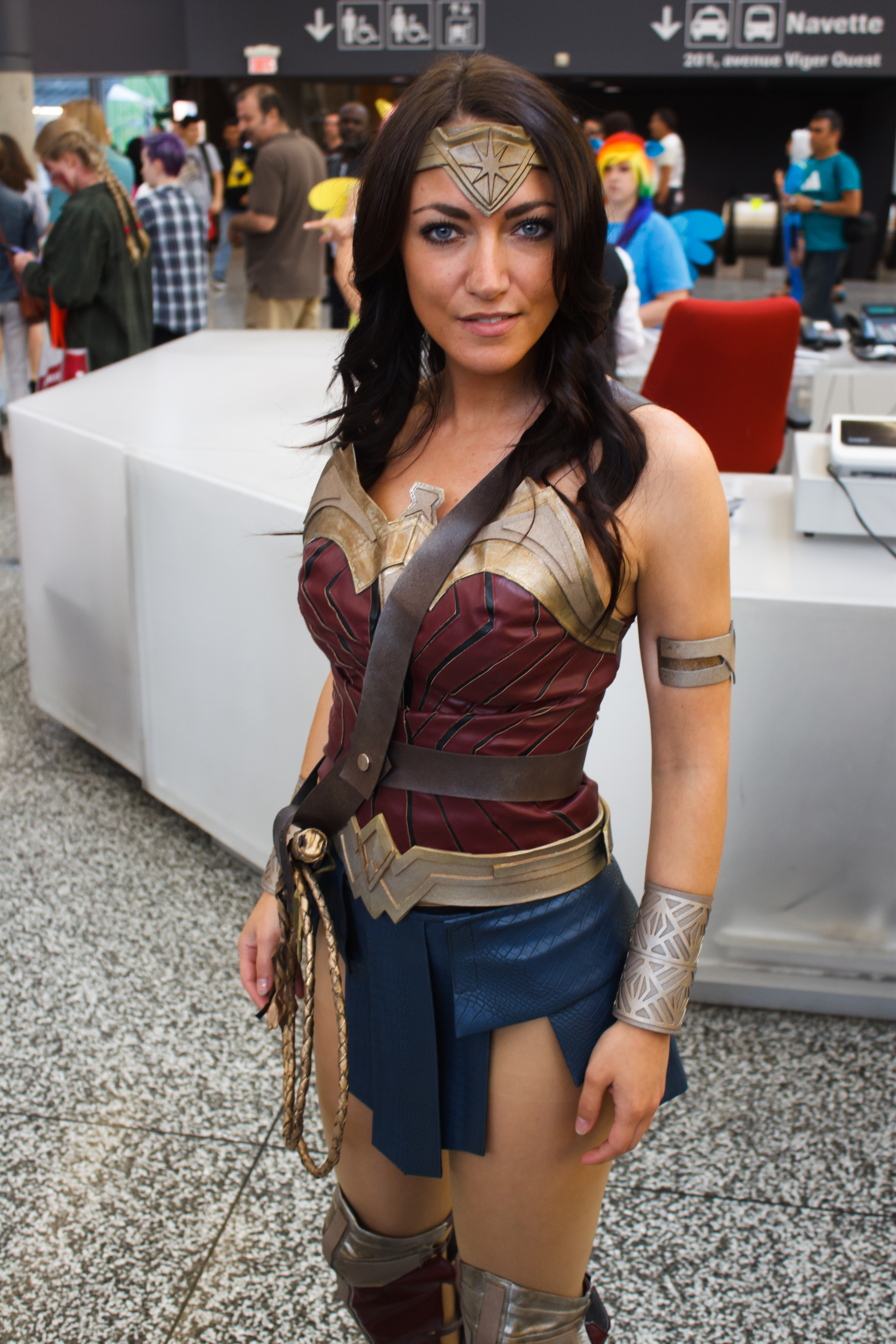
Cosplayer dressed as Gal Gadot's Wonder Woman at the 2016 Montreal Comiccon

Upon Wonder Woman's appearance in Batman v Superman, Jordan Hoffman of The Guardian noted in an ambivalent review of the film that Gadot's performance was the "best thing about the film". Cynthia Fuchs of PopMatters added in a similar review of the film that "Wonder Woman remains Batman v Superman's most compelling story, precisely because it's untold."

In Wonder Woman, Gadot's performance received a largely positive response from critics along with the film as a whole. Critics praised her chemistry with co-star Chris Pine and optimistic and lighthearted take on the character as opposed to that on other characters in the DCEU at that point. Elise Jost of Moviepilot specifically observed that "Gadot's take on Wonder Woman is one of those unique cases of an actor merging with their story, similar to Robert Downey Jr.'s Tony Stark. Gal Gadot is Wonder Woman, and Wonder Woman is Gal Gadot." She also praised Gadot's interpretation of Wonder Woman as the one in which Gadot "absolutely nails the character's unwaveringly positive outlook on life. She's a force of nature who believes in the greater good; her conviction that she's meant to save the world is stronger than her bullet-deflecting shield. She's genuine, she's fun, she's the warm source of energy at the heart of the movie."

However, there was some backlash in some Arab countries such as Lebanon and Qatar, which banned Wonder Woman due to Gadot's Israeli citizenship. Other countries such as Tunisia and Algeria saw the film pulled out of festivals due to Gadot's citizenship and military service. Jordan also reportedly considered a ban, but relented as there was no legal precedent for it.

In the theatrical release of Justice League, one of the biggest criticisms of the film was the scaling back of Wonder Woman's role and her alleged objectification by the film's creators, especially during the film's reshoots. In addition, Wonder Woman director Patty Jenkins lambasted Diana's portrayal in the theatrical cut, saying that it contradicted with the character's portrayal in her film and Zack Snyder's version of Justice League. Wonder Woman's arc and depiction in Zack Snyder's Justice League received better reviews.

In Wonder Woman 1984, Gadot once again received praise for her performance as Wonder Woman, though the film received mixed reviews. Mick LaSalle of the San Francisco Chronicle praised Gadot, saying, "Her performance here has dignity and earned emotion" and called her the best thing about the film and "She was the best thing in the first installment, too, but that was an excellent movie. This one isn't." In addition, Diana's decision to have sex with Steve Trevor, who was actually possessing another man's body, was subject to controversy.

=== Accolades ===
Gadot has received numerous nominations and awards for her portrayal of Diana Prince.

Year	Film	Award	Category	Result	Ref(s)
2016	Batman v Superman: Dawn of Justice	Chinese American Film Festival	Most Popular US Actress in China	Won	
2016	Batman v Superman: Dawn of Justice	Critics' Choice Awards	Best Actress in an Action Movie	Nominated	
2016	Batman v Superman: Dawn of Justice	Teen Choice Awards	Choice Movie: Breakout Star	Nominated	
2016	Batman v Superman: Dawn of Justice	Teen Choice Awards	Choice Movie: Scene Stealer	Nominated	
2016	Batman v Superman: Dawn of Justice	Women Film Critics Circle Awards	Best Female Action Hero	Nominated	
2017	Wonder Woman	Detroit Film Critics Society	Breakthrough	Nominated	
2017	Wonder Woman	National Board of Review Awards	Spotlight Award	Won	
2017	Wonder Woman	North Texas Film Critics Association	Best Actress	Nominated	
2017	Wonder Woman	Teen Choice Awards	Choice Liplock (shared with Chris Pine)	Nominated	
2017	Wonder Woman	Teen Choice Awards	Choice Movie: Action Actress	Won	
2017	Wonder Woman	Teen Choice Awards	Choice Movie: Actress Summer	Nominated	
2017	Wonder Woman	Teen Choice Awards	Choice Movie: Ship (shared with Chris Pine)	Nominated	
2018	Wonder Woman	Jupiter Award	Best International Actress	Won	
2018	Wonder Woman	MTV Movie & TV Awards	Best Fight (Wonder Woman vs German soldiers)	Won	
2018	Wonder Woman	MTV Movie & TV Awards	Best Hero	Nominated	
2018	Wonder Woman	Palm Springs International Film Festival	Rising Star Award - Actress	Won	
2018	Wonder Woman	Santa Barbara Film Festival	Virtuosos Award	Won	
2018	Wonder Woman	Saturn Awards	Best Actress	Won	
2018	Justice League	Teen Choice Awards	Choice Movie Actress: Action	Nominated	
2020	Wonder Woman 1984	Jay Entertainment Critics Awards	Best Actress	Won	
2021	Wonder Woman 1984	Entretenews Awards	Best Actress	Won	
2021	Wonder Woman 1984	Entretenews Awards	Best Heroine	Won	
2021	Wonder Woman 1984	Cape & Castle Awards	Best Actress of the Year	Won	
2021	Wonder Woman 1984	Golden Tomato Awards	Fan Favorite Actress of the Year	Nominated	
2021	Wonder Woman 1984	Jupiter Award	Best International Actress	Won	
2021	Wonder Woman 1984	Kids' Choice Awards	Favorite Movie Actress	Nominated	
2021	Wonder Woman 1984	Kids' Choice Awards	Favorite Superhero	Won	
2021	Wonder Woman 1984	MTV Movie & TV Awards	Best Hero	Nominated	
2021	Wonder Woman 1984	Series Em Cena Awards	Best Actress	Won	
2021	Wonder Woman 1984	Alpha Pro Awards	Best Actress in a Superhero Movie	Won	
2021	Wonder Woman 1984	Alpha Pro Awards	Best Female Hero	Won	
2021	Wonder Woman 1984	Alpha Pro Awards	Best Superhero	Won	
2021	Wonder Woman 1984	Comic Book Film Awards	Best Actress	Pending	
2021	Wonder Woman 1984	Comic Book Film Awards	Best Hero	Pending	
2021	Zack Snyder's; Justice League	MTV Movie & TV Awards	Best Fight (Final fight between Justice League and Steppenwolf)	Nominated	
2022	Zack Snyder's; Justice League	Critics' Choice Super Awards	Best Actress in a Superhero Movie	Nominated	

== See also ==
- Wonder Woman in other media
- Characters of the DC Extended Universe
