= Mythology (fiction) =

Fiction franchise's overarching plot

Mythology (also referred to as a mythos) is the term often used by fans of a particular book, television, or film series to describe a fiction franchise's overarching plot and often mysterious backstory. Daniel Peretti argues that mythology "is often used emically to refer to back story". The term was pioneered by the American science fiction series The X-Files, which first aired in 1993. With this being said, many other forms of media have some sort of mythology, and the term is often applied in regards to Buffy the Vampire Slayer, Lost, and the Batman and Superman comics, among others.

Some fictional series more literally have a mythology, i.e. a cycle of fictional myths, as part of the in-universe material. An unusually well-developed and comparatively early example is that of the legendarium of J. R. R. Tolkien (including his Middle-earth stories), for which he developed written myths and epic poems, some in fictional languages like Elvish.

== See also ==
- Fictional universe
- Mythology of Carnivàle
- Mythology of Fringe
- Mythology of Lost
- Mythology of Stargate
- Mythology of The X-Files
