= List of DC Extended Universe cast members =

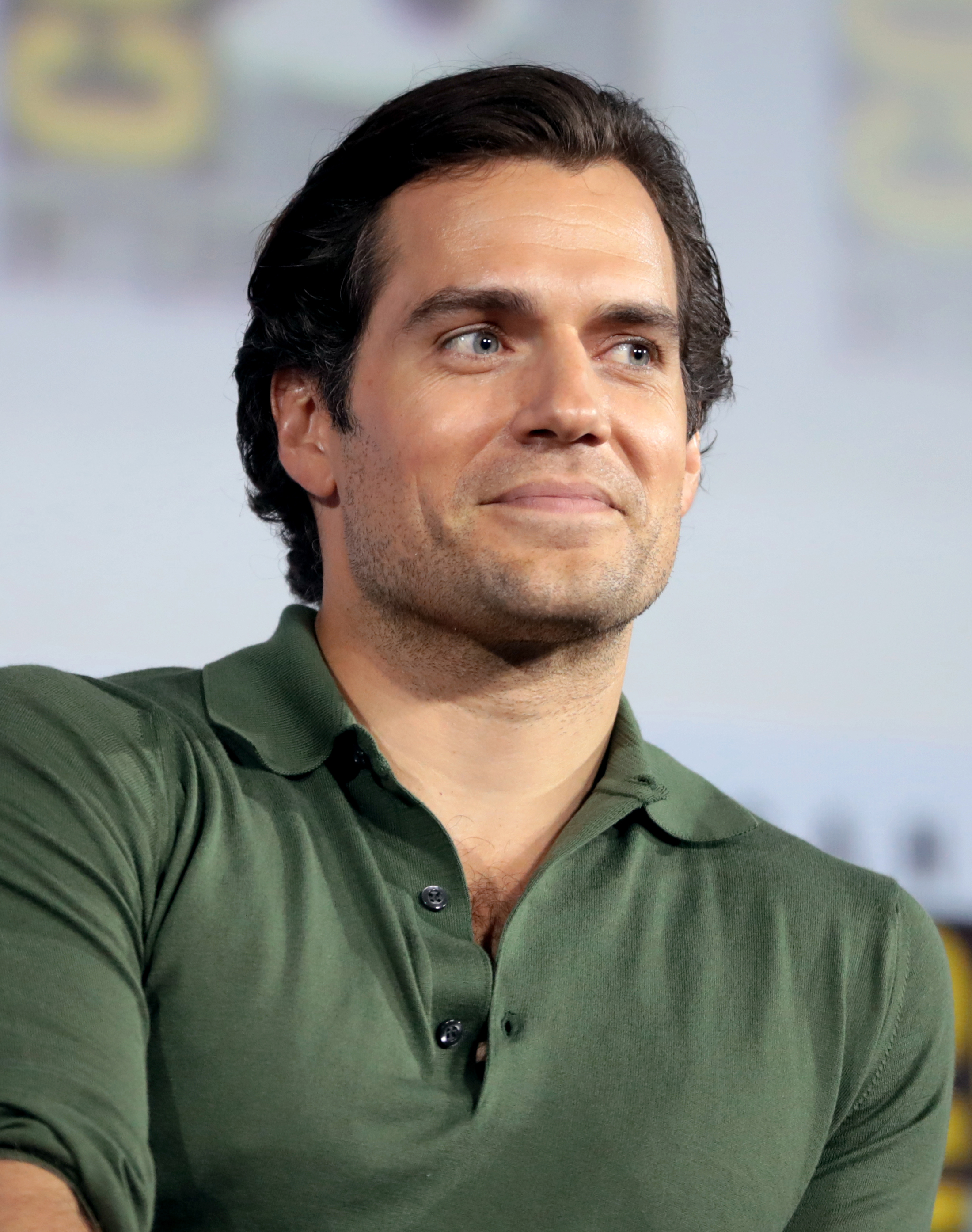
Henry Cavill

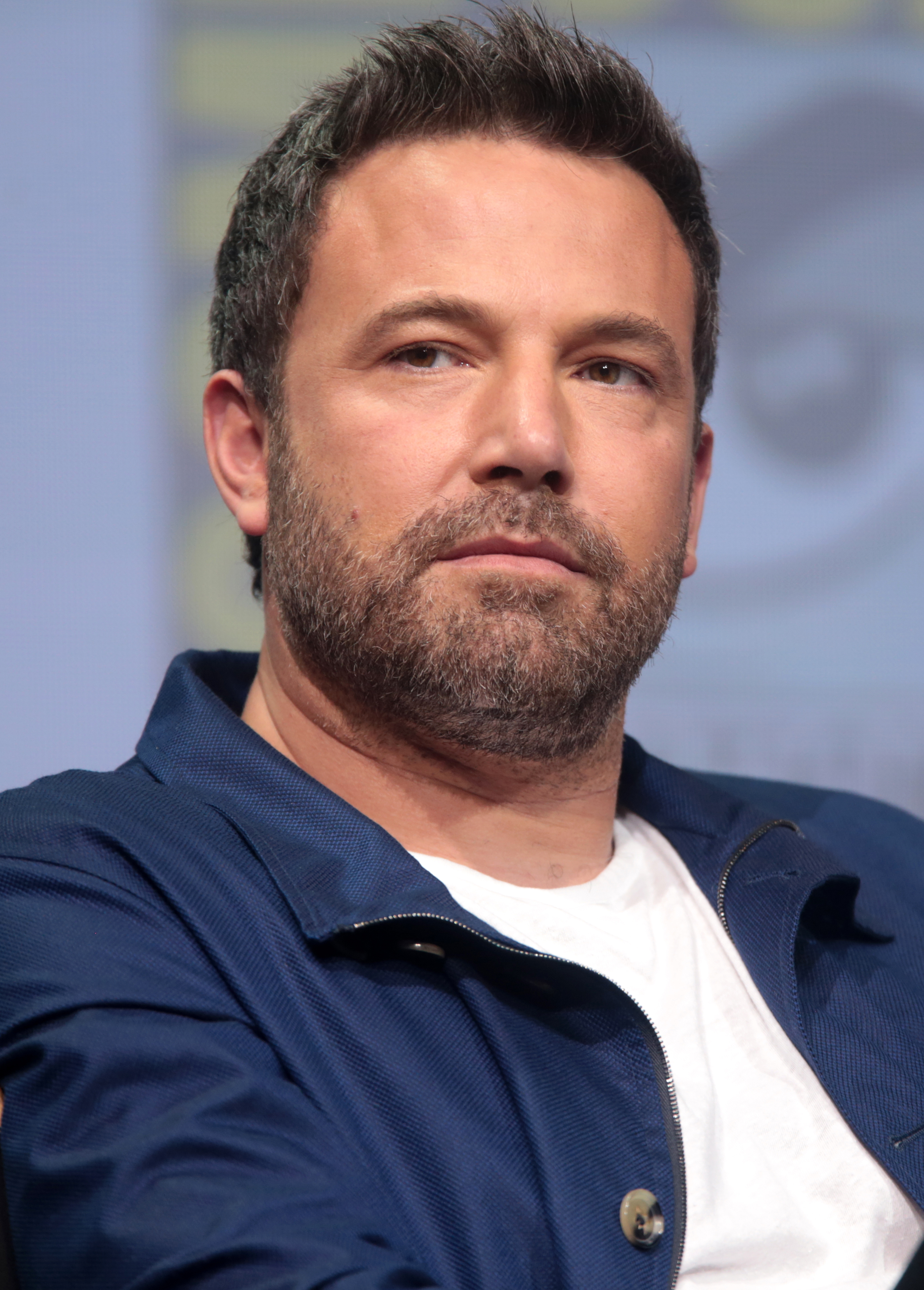
Ben Affleck

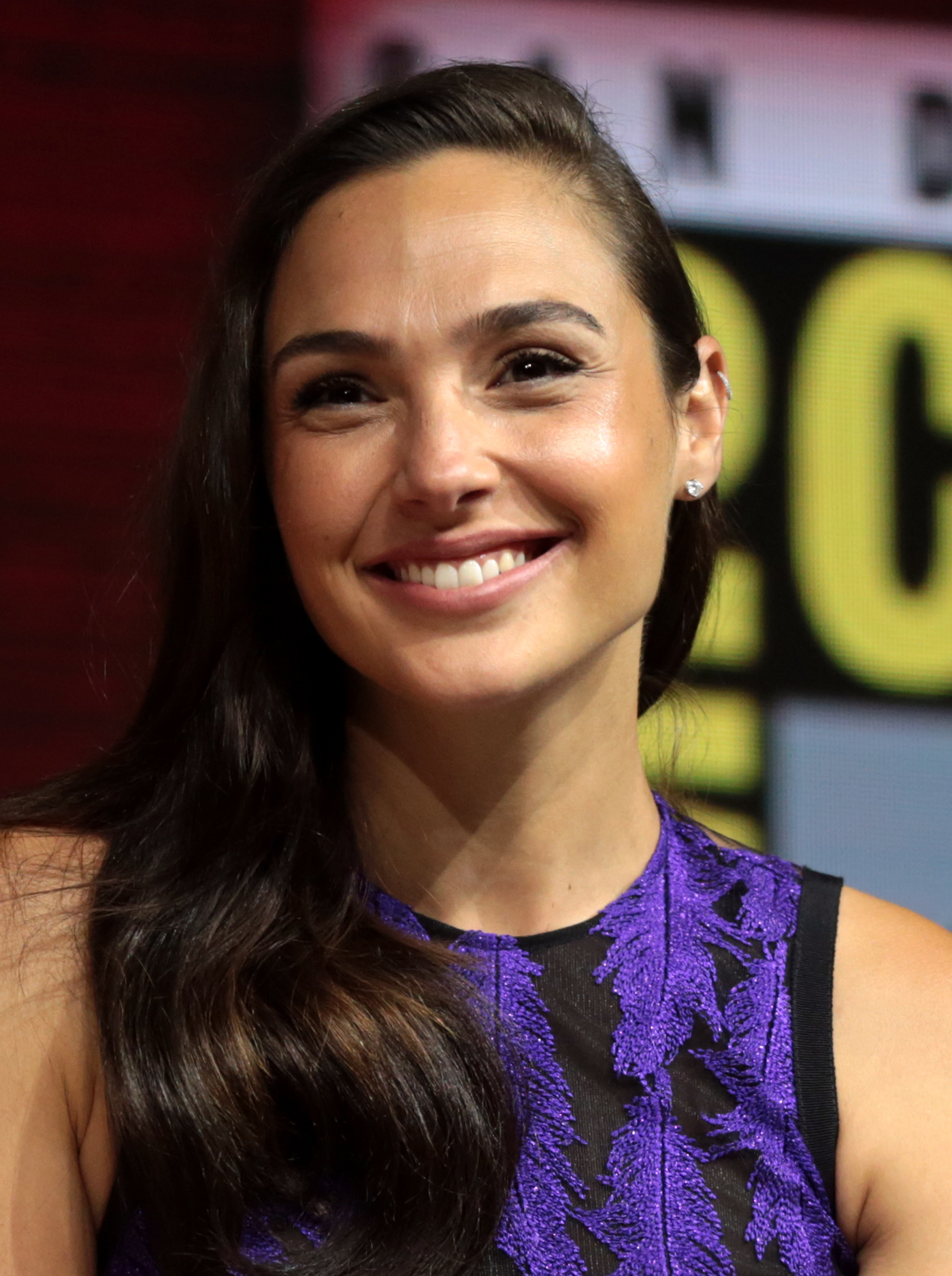
Gal Gadot

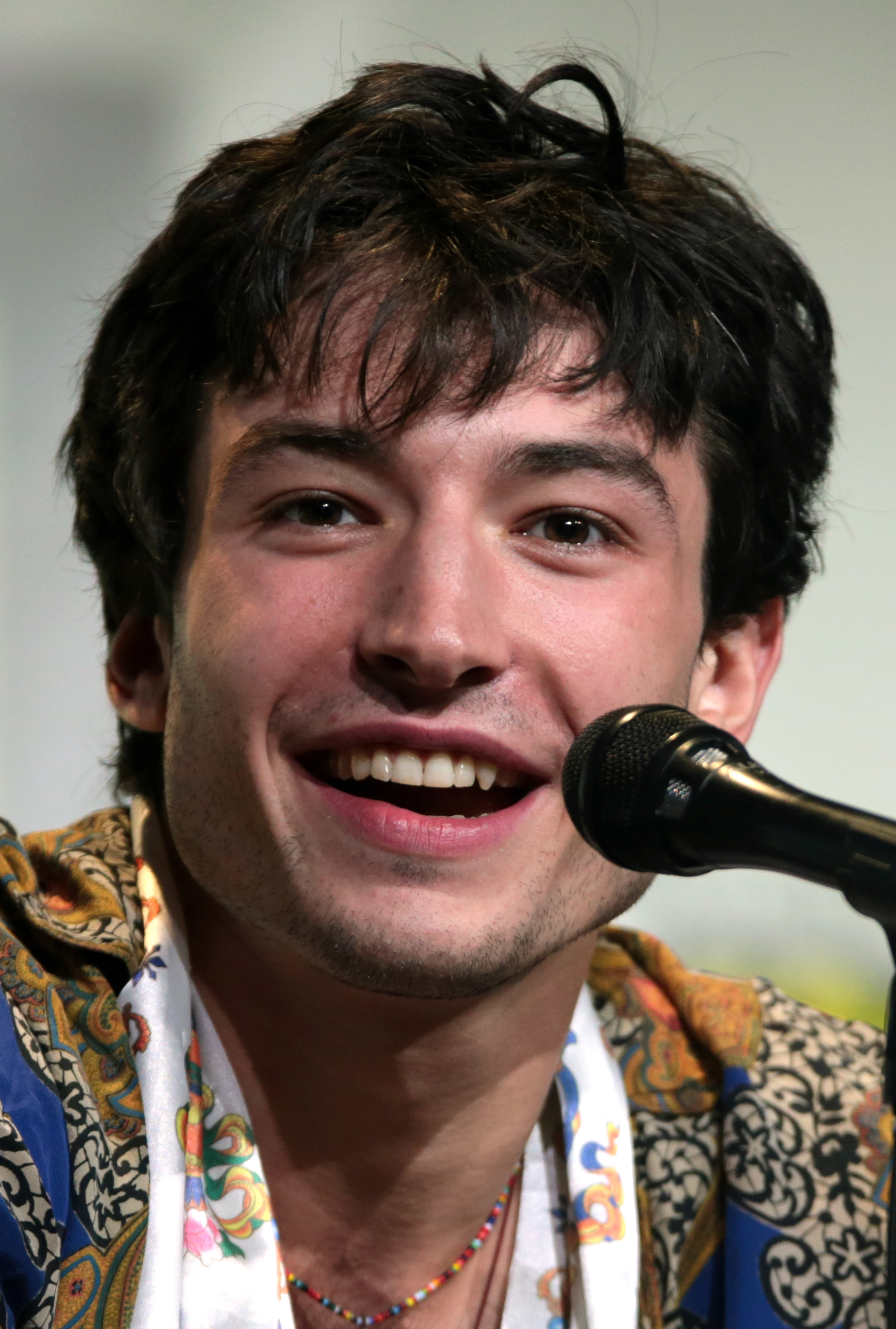
Ezra Miller

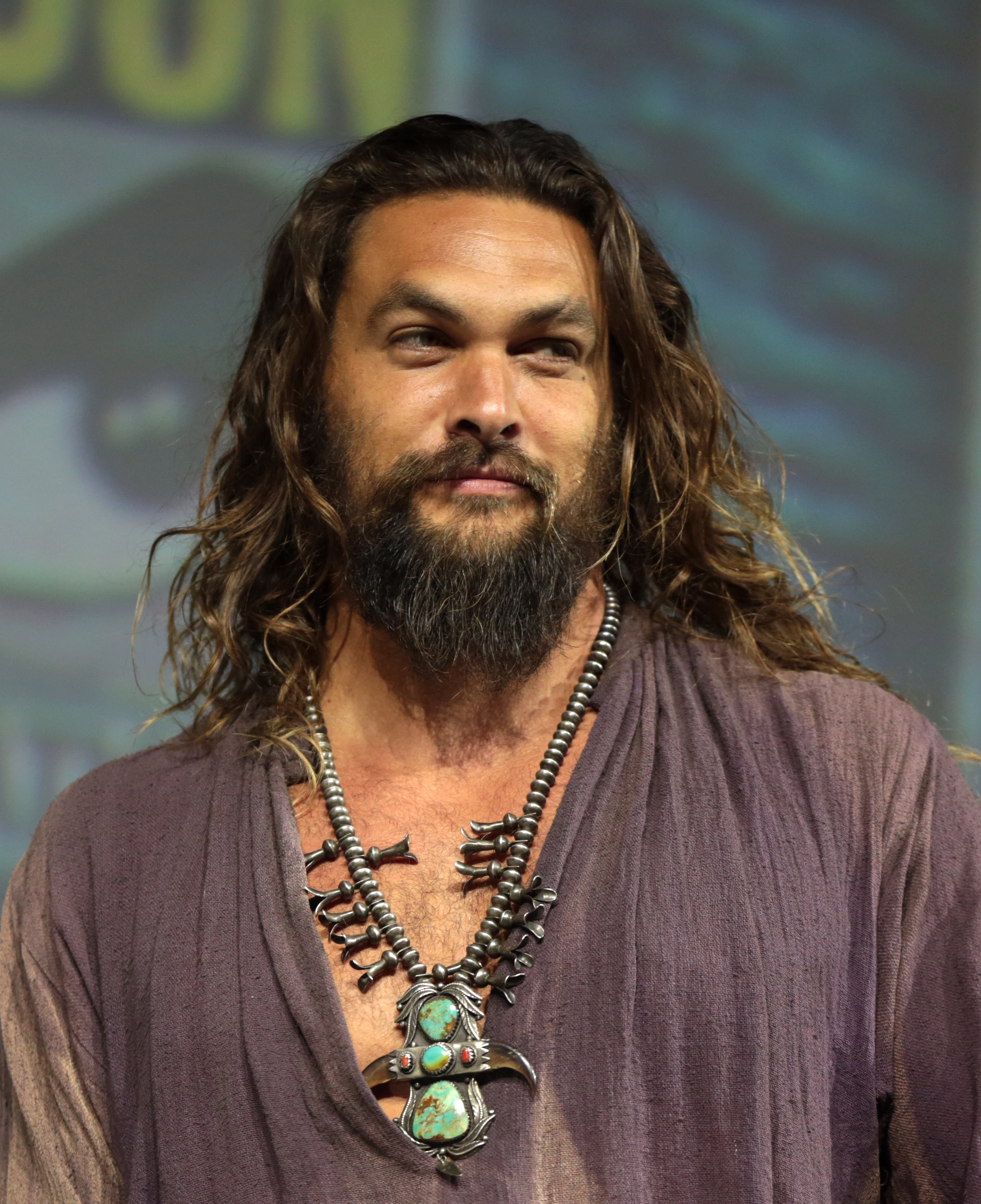
Jason Momoa

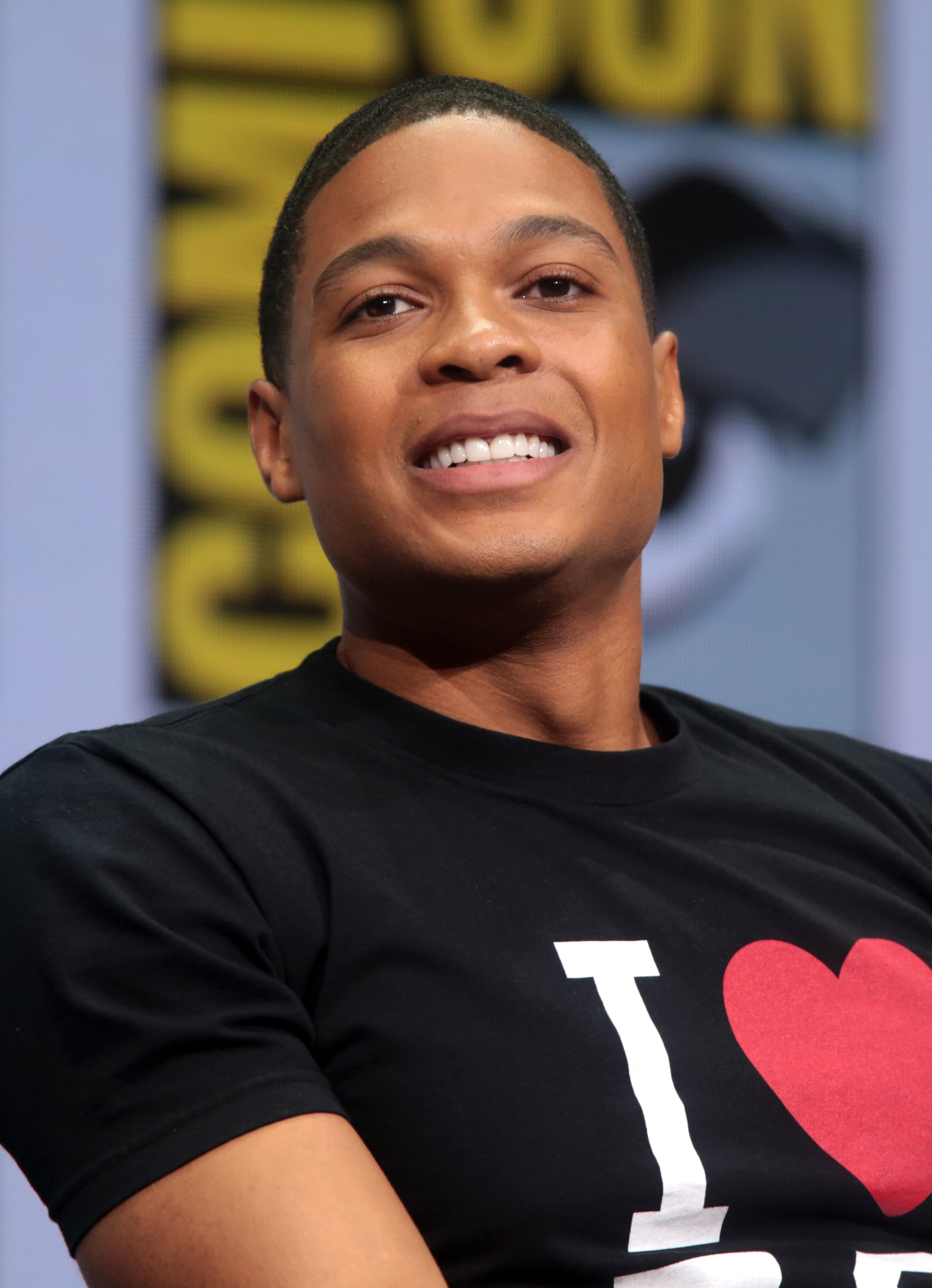
Ray Fisher

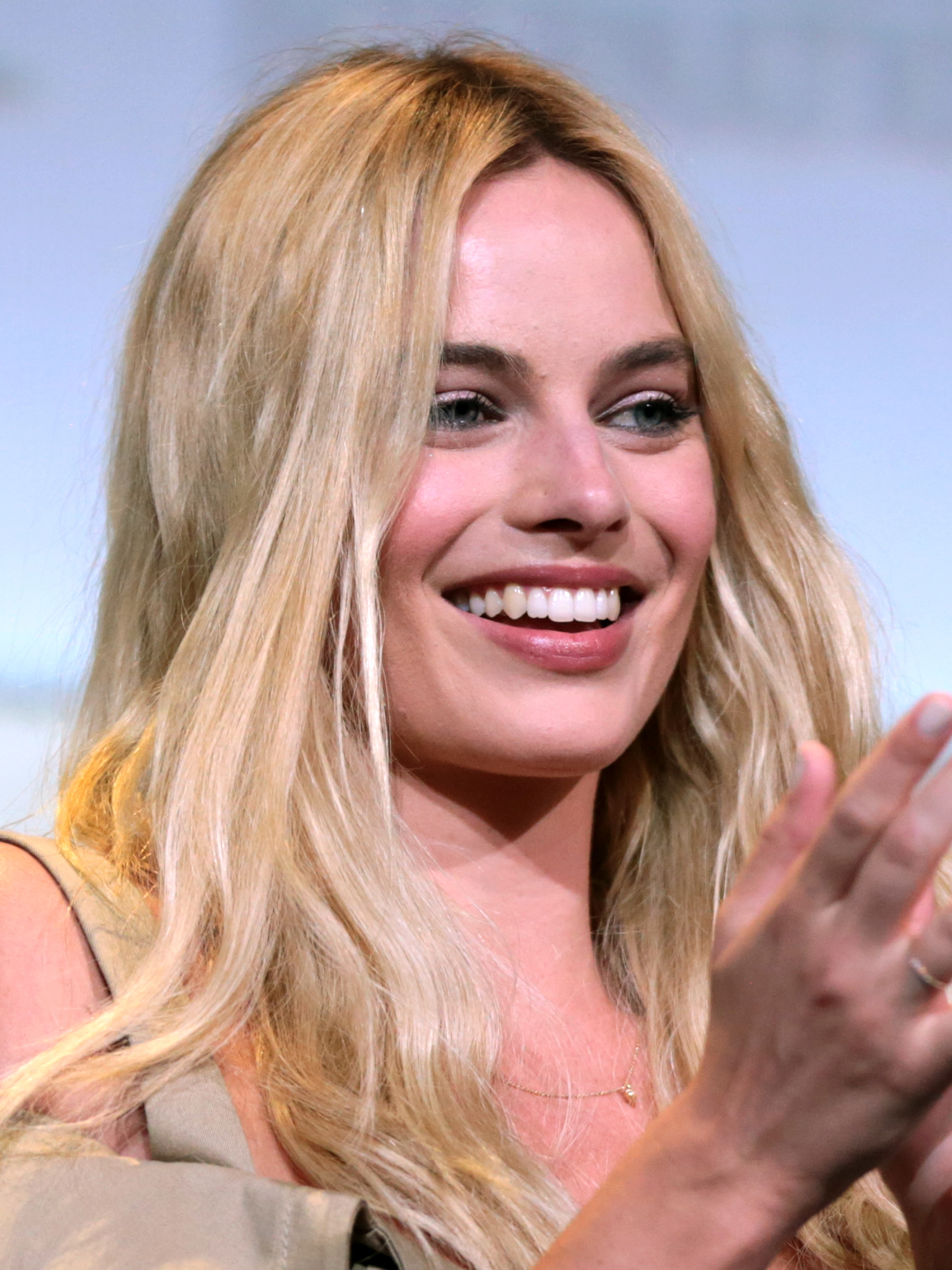
Margot Robbie

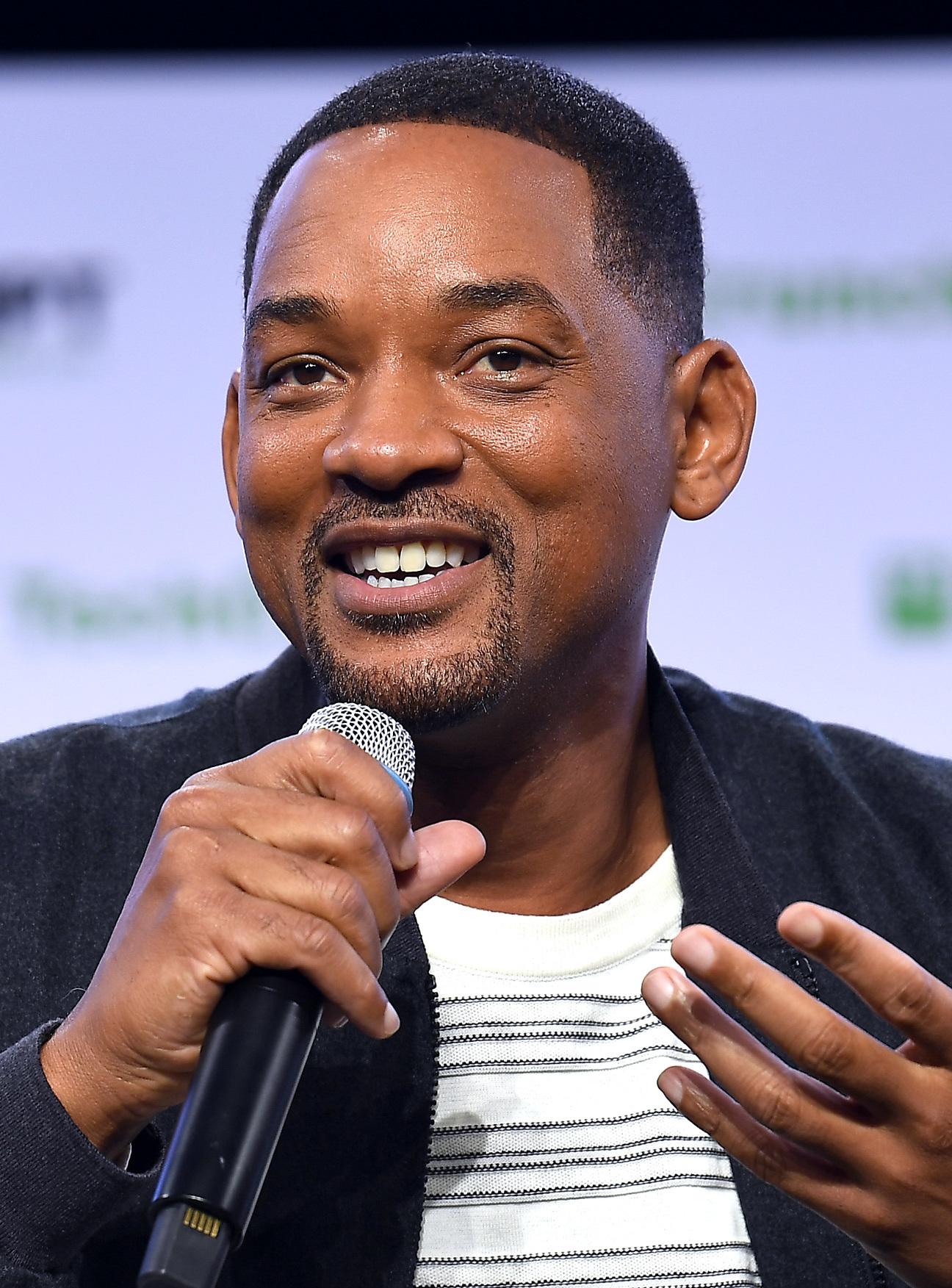
Will Smith

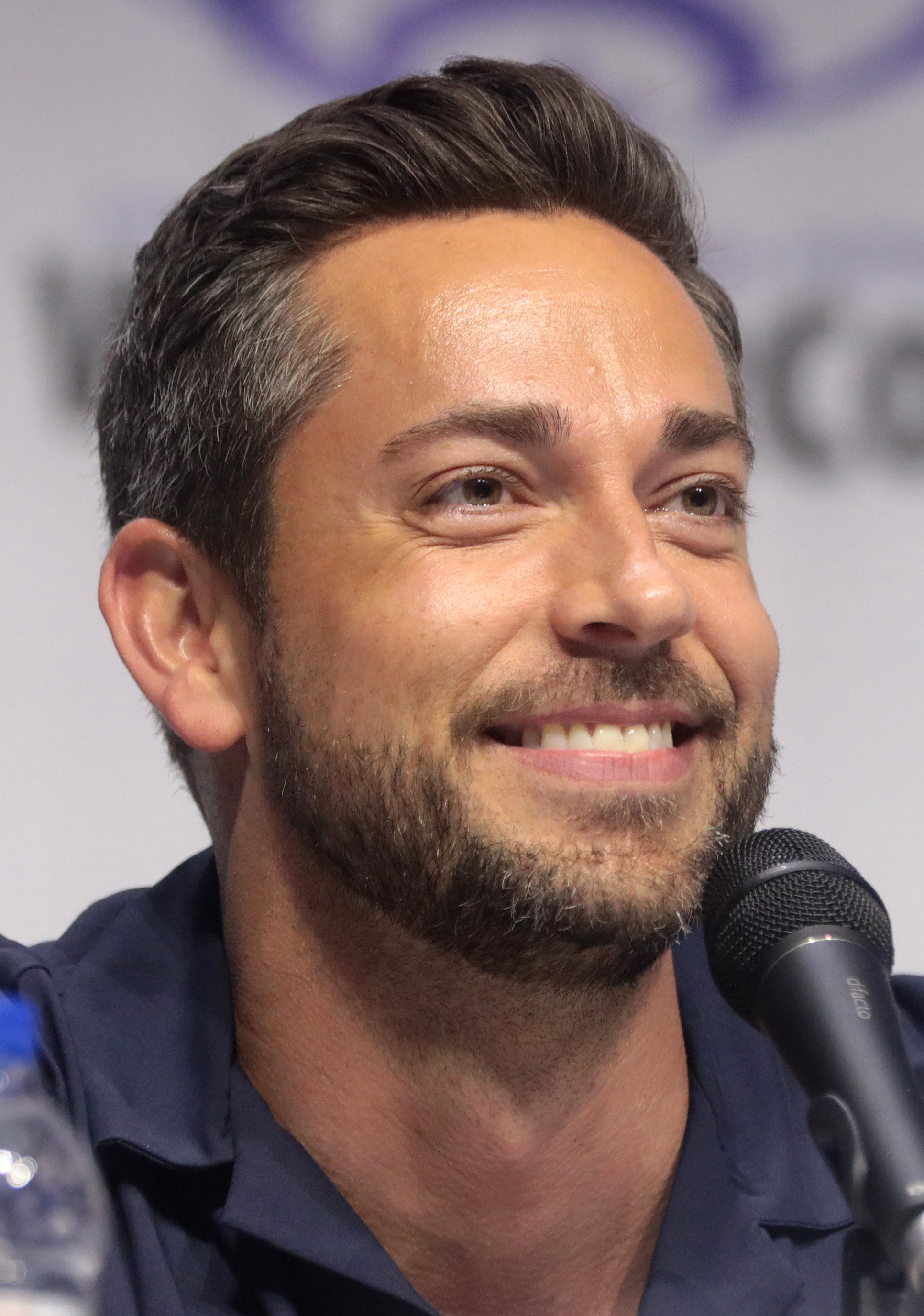
Zachary Levi

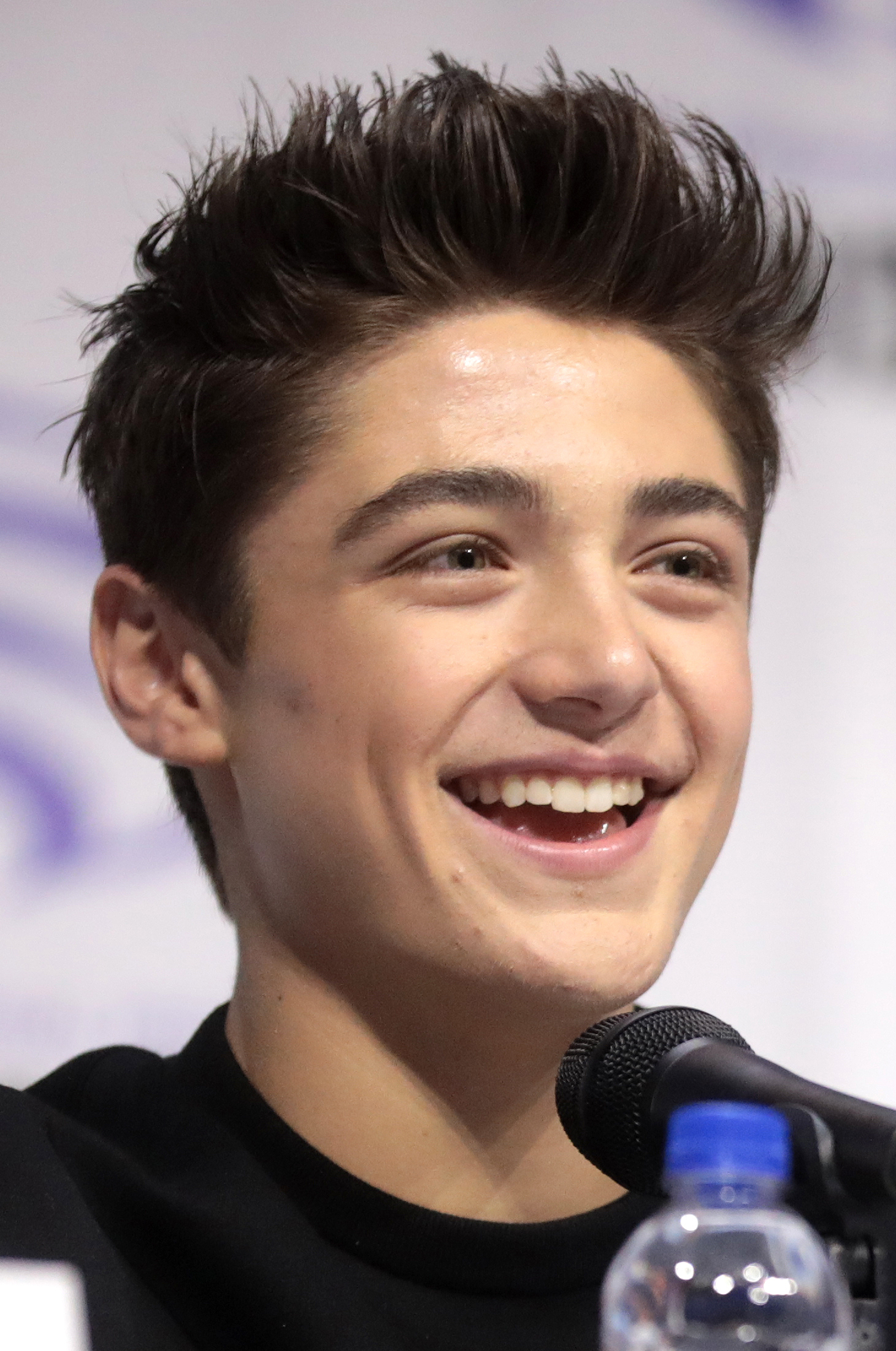
Asher Angel

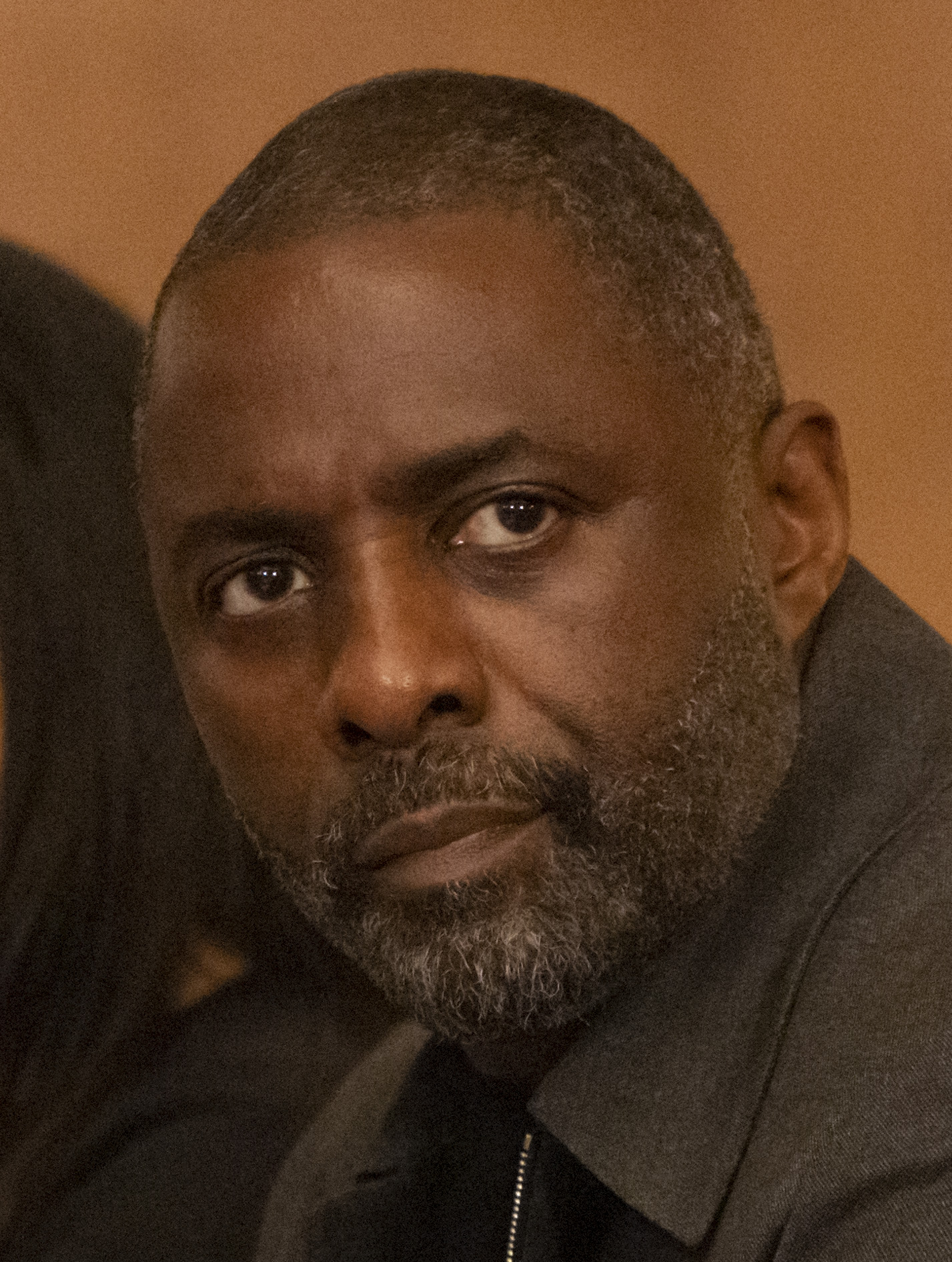
Idris Elba

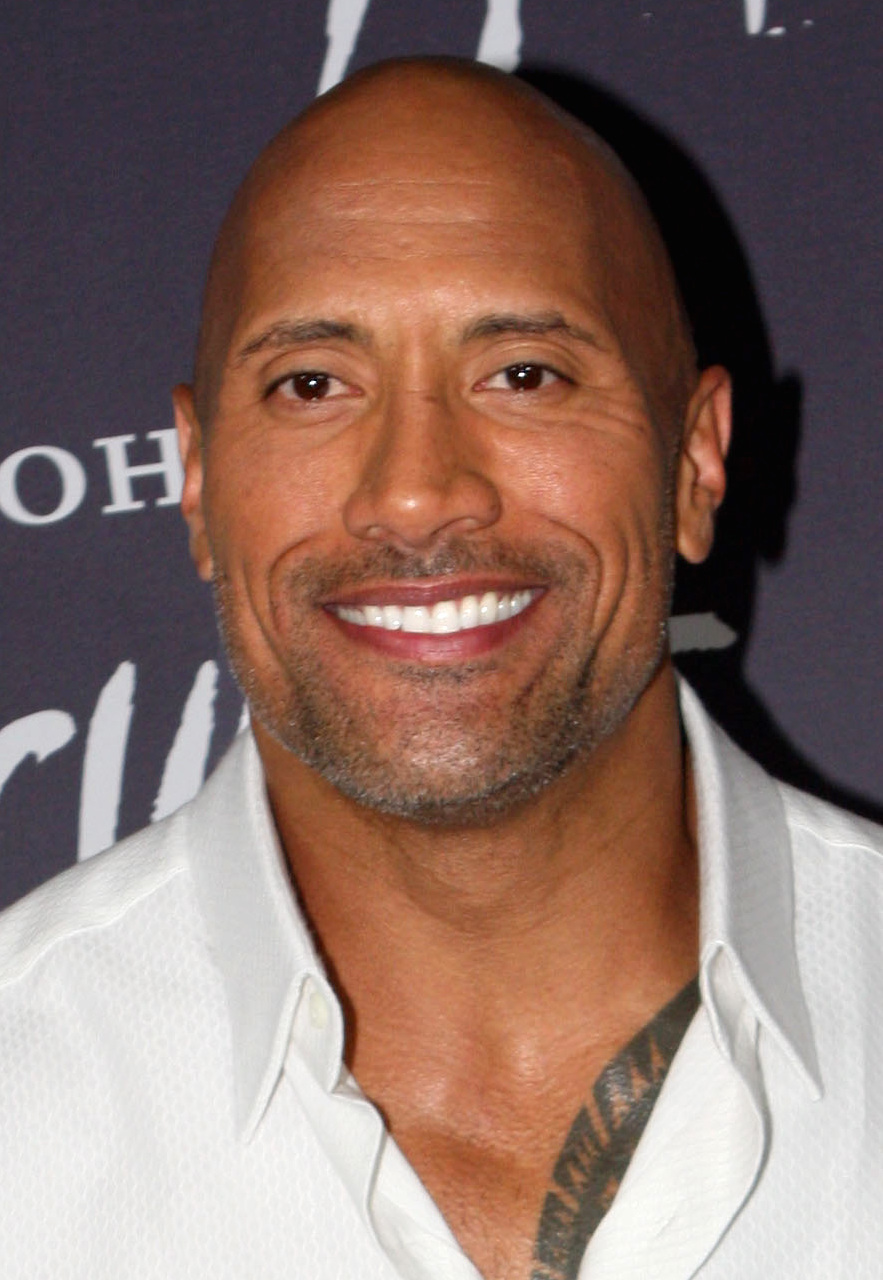
Dwayne Johnson

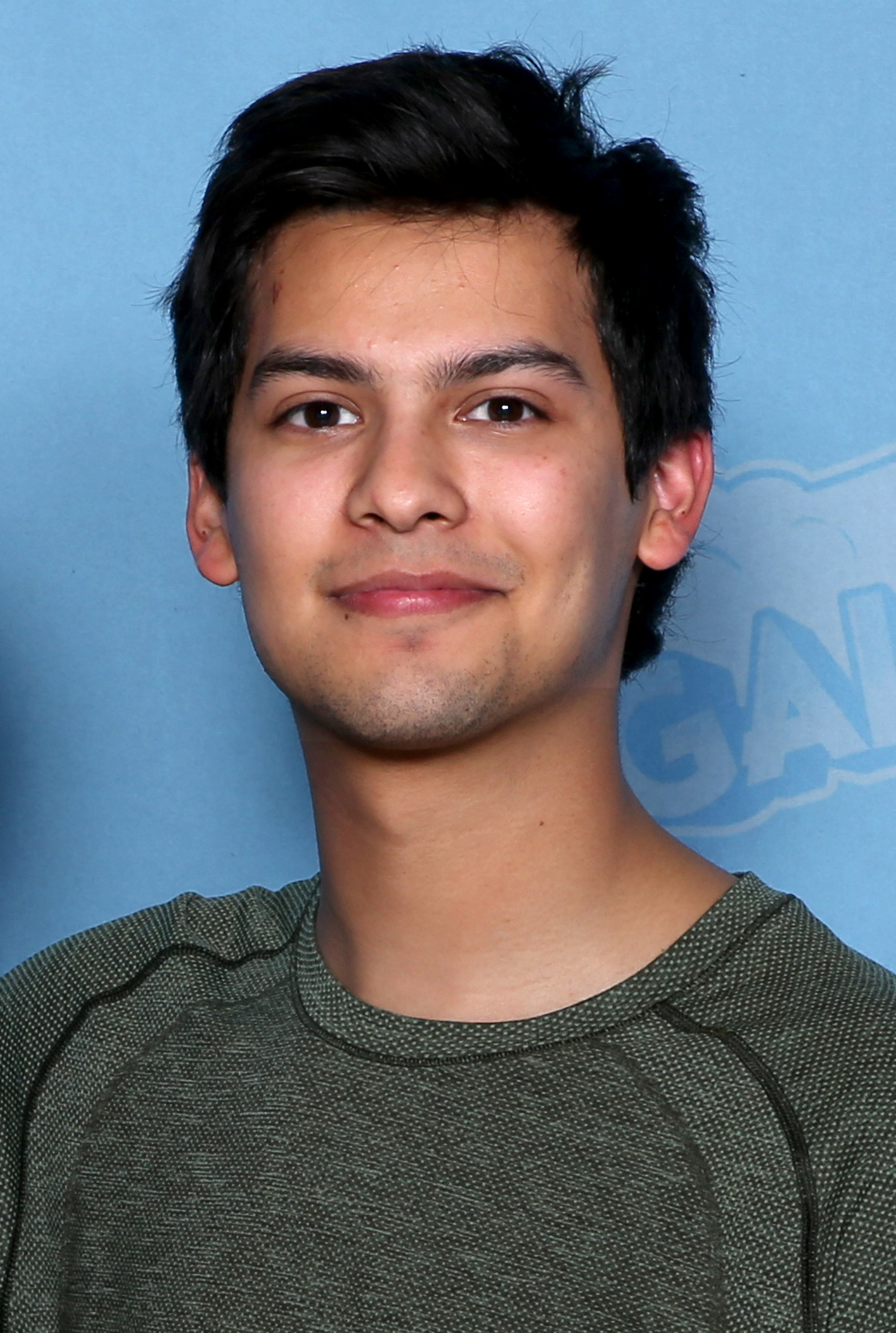
Xolo Maridueña

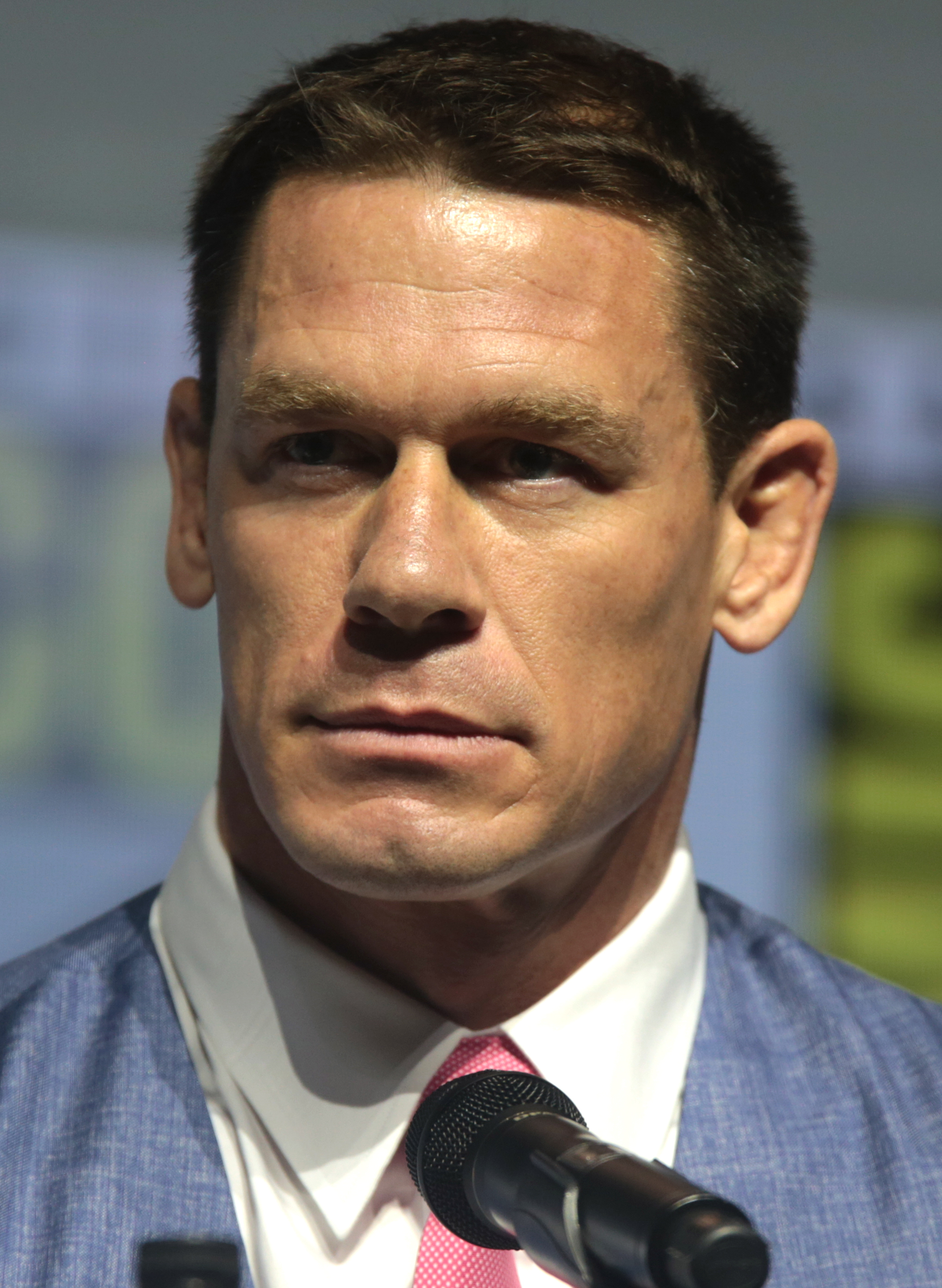
John Cena

Cavill, Affleck, Gadot, Miller, Momoa, and Fisher star in Justice League and other films in the DCEU, while Robbie, Smith, Levi, Angel, Elba, Johnson, and Maridueña headline their own films in the DCEU as well. Cena headlines his own television series.

The DC Extended Universe (DCEU) is a shared universe centered on a group of film franchises based on characters by DC Comics and distributed by Warner Bros. Pictures.

As the film franchises are adapted from a variety of DC Comics properties, there are multiple lead actors. Henry Cavill stars as Kal-El / Clark Kent / Superman in the films Man of Steel (2013) and Batman v Superman: Dawn of Justice (2016), while Ben Affleck and Gal Gadot portray Bruce Wayne / Batman and Diana Prince / Wonder Woman, respectively, in the latter film, along with Ezra Miller as Barry Allen / The Flash, Jason Momoa as Arthur Curry / Aquaman, and Ray Fisher as Victor Stone / Cyborg. Affleck and Miller reprise their roles in Suicide Squad (2016), while Gadot reprises her role in Wonder Woman (2017) and Wonder Woman 1984 (2020). All six actors reprise their roles in Justice League (2017), as well as in its 2021 director's cut. Momoa stars in Aquaman (2018) and its sequel Aquaman and the Lost Kingdom (2023), while Miller stars in The Flash (2023) in which Affleck, Gadot, and Momoa make cameo appearances.

Margot Robbie portrays Harleen Quinzel / Harley Quinn in Suicide Squad and reprises her role in Birds of Prey (2020) and The Suicide Squad (2021). Will Smith and Idris Elba also star as Floyd Lawton / Deadshot and Robert DuBois / Bloodsport in Suicide Squad and The Suicide Squad, respectively. Zachary Levi portrays the eponymous protagonist in Shazam! (2019), with Asher Angel playing the character's alter-ego Billy Batson; both return in Shazam! Fury of the Gods (2023), where Gadot makes a cameo appearance. After being introduced in The Suicide Squad, John Cena stars as Christopher Smith / Peacemaker in the first season of the television series Peacemaker (2022), with cameo appearances of Miller and Momoa. Dwayne Johnson portrays Teth-Adam / Black Adam in Black Adam (2022), which features a cameo appearance by Cavill, and Xolo Maridueña headlines Blue Beetle (2023) as Jaime Reyes / Blue Beetle.

Other recurring cast members within the DCEU include Amy Adams, Kiersey Clemons, Kevin Costner, Willem Dafoe, Viola Davis, Laurence Fishburne, Amber Heard, Jeremy Irons, Nicole Kidman, Joel Kinnaman, Diane Lane, Jared Leto, Joe Morton, Connie Nielsen, Chris Pine, Michael Shannon, Mark Strong, Patrick Wilson, and Robin Wright.

== 2013–2020 ==
List indicators

This section includes characters who have appeared in the films.

- An empty grey cell indicates the character was not in the film.
- ^{A} indicates an appearance through archival footage or audio.
- ^{C} indicates a cameo role.
- ^{E} indicates an appearance not included in the theatrical cut.
- ^{O} indicates an older version of the character.
- ^{P} indicates an appearance in onscreen photographs.
- ^{S} indicates an appearance through use of special effects.
- ^{V} indicates a voice-only role.
- ^{Y} indicates a younger version of the character.
- ^{TV} indicates the character appears in a DCEU television series.
- ^{U} indicates the character has a Multiverse appearance outside of the DCEU or originates from an alternate reality.
- ^{2} indicates the character reappears in a film that released from 2021–2023.
- ^{R} indicates the character will appear in the rebooted DC Universe shared film universe portrayed by the same actor. These characters have been confirmed to be multiverse variants separate from their original DCEU counterparts.

Character	2013	2016		2017		2018	2019	2020	
Character	Man of Steel	Batman v Superman: Dawn of Justice	Suicide Squad	Wonder Woman	Justice League	Aquaman	Shazam!	Birds of Prey	Wonder Woman 1984
=== Introduced in Man of Steel ===
Tor-An	Richard Cetrone								
Kenny Braverman	Rowen Kahn								
Jor-El	Russell Crowe				Russell Crowe^{E}^{V}				
Kal-El / Clark Kent Superman^{TV} ^{2}	Henry Cavill Dylan Sprayberry^{Y} Cooper Timberline^{Y}	Henry Cavill			Henry Cavill		Ryan Hadley (stand-in)^{C}		
Dev-Em	Revard Dufresne								
Lor-Em	Julian Richings								
Faora-Ul^{2}^{U}	Antje Traue								
Carrie Farris	Christina Wren	Christina Wren							
Emil Hamilton	Richard Schiff								
Nathan Hardy	Christopher Meloni								
Jenny Jurwich	Rebecca Buller	Rebecca Buller							
Kelor	Carla Gugino^{V}	Carla Gugino^{V}			Carla Gugino ^{E}^{V}				
Jonathan Kent	Kevin Costner	Kevin Costner^{C}			Kevin Costner^{P}^{E}^{V}				
Martha Kent	Diane Lane	Diane Lane			Diane Lane				
Lois Lane	Amy Adams	Amy Adams			Amy Adams				
Lana Lang	Jadin Gould								
Father Leone	Coburn Goss	Coburn Goss^{E}							
Steve Lombard	Michael Kelly								
Lara Lor-Van	Ayelet Zurer								
Nadira	Apollonia Vanova								
Nam-Ek^{2}^{U}	Michael Justus								
Pete Ross	Joseph Cranford	Joseph Cranford^{E}							
Calvin Swanwick Martian Manhunter	Harry Lennix	Harry Lennix			Harry Lennix^{E}				
Jax-Ur	Mackenzie Gray								
Car-Vex	Samantha Win								
Perry White	Laurence Fishburne	Laurence Fishburne							
General Zod^{2}^{U}	Michael Shannon	Michael Shannon^{S} (Note: The corpse of General Zod appears in Batman v Superman: Dawn of Justice, but Michael Shannon did not film any scenes and the corpse was created using the physique of fitness model Greg Plitt and a headcast of Shannon.)							
=== Introduced in Batman v Superman: Dawn of Justice ===
Barry Allen The Flash^{TV} ^{U} ^{2}		Ezra Miller^{C}	Ezra Miller^{C}		Ezra Miller				
Charlie		Ewen Bremner^{P}		Ewen Bremner					Ewen Bremner^{P}
Chief		Eugene Brave Rock^{P}		Eugene Brave Rock					Eugene Brave Rock^{P}
Joe Chill		Damon Caro^{C}							
Arthur Curry Aquaman^{TV} ^{2}		Jason Momoa^{C}	Jason Momoa^{P}		Jason Momoa	Jason Momoa Kaan Guldur^{Y} Otis Dhanji^{Y} Kekoa Kekumano^{Y}			
Doomsday		Robin Atkin Downes							
June Finch		Holly Hunter							
Mercy Graves		Tao Okamoto							
Wallace Keefe		Scoot McNairy							
Jenet Klyburn		Jena Malone^{E}							
Anatoli Knyazev		Callan Mulvey							
Lex Luthor		Jesse Eisenberg			Jesse Eisenberg				
Jimmy Olsen		Michael Cassidy^{C}							
Alfred Pennyworth^{2}		Jeremy Irons			Jeremy Irons				
Diana Prince Wonder Woman^{TV} ^{2}		Gal Gadot		Gal Gadot Lilly Aspell^{Y} Emily Carey^{Y}	Gal Gadot				Gal Gadot Lilly Aspell^{Y}
Senator Purrington		Patrick Leahy^{C}							
Sameer		Saïd Taghmaoui^{P}		Saïd Taghmaoui					Saïd Taghmaoui^{P}
Steppenwolf		^{E} ^{S}			Ciarán Hinds^{S}				
Silas Stone		Joe Morton^{C}			Joe Morton				
Victor Stone Cyborg		Ray Fisher^{C}			Ray Fisher				
Steve Trevor		Chris Pine^{P}		Chris Pine					Chris Pine
Emmet Vale		Ralph Lister							
Bruce Wayne Batman^{2}		Ben Affleck Brandon Spink^{Y}	Ben Affleck		Ben Affleck				
Martha Wayne		Lauren Cohan							
Thomas Wayne		Jeffrey Dean Morgan							
Parademons^{2}		Michael Owusu^{S}							
POTUS		Patrick Wilson^{C}^{V}							Stuart Milligan
=== Introduced in Suicide Squad ===
Rick Flag^{2} ^{R}			Joel Kinnaman						
Jonny Frost			Jim Parrack						
George Harkness Captain Boomerang^{2}			Jai Courtney					Jai Courtney^{P}	
Incubus			Alain Chanoine						
Joker			Jared Leto		Jared Leto^{E}			Jared Leto^{A} John Goth (stand-in)	
Waylon Jones Killer Croc			Adewale Akinnuoye-Agbaje						
Floyd Lawton Deadshot			Will Smith						
Zoe Lawton			Shailyn Pierre-Dixon						
June Moone Enchantress			Cara Delevingne						
Harleen Quinzel Harley Quinn^{2}			Margot Robbie					Margot Robbie	
Chato Santana El Diablo			Jay Hernandez						
Dexter Tolliver			David Harbour						
Amanda Waller^{TV} ^{R}			Viola Davis						
Christopher Weiss Slipknot			Adam Beach						
Tatsu Yamashiro Katana			Karen Fukuhara						
=== Introduced in Wonder Woman ===
Acantha				Florence Kasumba					
Antiope				Robin Wright	Robin Wright^{C}				Robin Wright
Ares Sir Patrick Morgan				David Thewlis	David Thewlis^{C}				
Artemis				Ann Wolfe					
Etta Candy				Lucy Davis					Lucy Davis^{P}
Egeria				Madeleine Vall Beijner					
Epione				Eleanor Matsuura	Eleanor Matsuura				
Euboea				Samantha Win	Samantha Win				
Queen Hippolyta				Connie Nielsen	Connie Nielsen				Connie Nielsen
Erich Ludendorff				Danny Huston					
Isabel Maru Doctor Poison				Elena Anaya					
Menalippe				Lisa Loven Kongsli	Lisa Loven Kongsli				
Mnemosyne				Josette Simon					
Orana				Mayling Ng					
Penthesilea				Brooke Ence	Brooke Ence				
Philippus				Ann Ogbomo	Ann Ogbomo				
Trigona				Hari James	Hari James				Hari James
Venelia				Doutzen Kroes	Doutzen Kroes				Doutzen Kroes
Zeus				^{S}	Sergi Constance				
=== Introduced in Justice League ===
Artemis					Aurore Lauzeral				
Ancient Atlantean King					Julian Lewis Jones				
Crispus Allen					Kobna Holdbrook-Smith				
Henry Allen^{2}					Billy Crudup				
Ryan Choi The Atom					Ryan Zheng^{E}				
Darkseid					Ray Porter^{E}				
DeSaad					Peter Guinness^{E}				
Goodness Granny Goodness					^{C} ^{S} ^{E}				
James Gordon					J. K. Simmons				
Kilowog					^{C} ^{S} ^{E}				
Mera^{2}					Amber Heard	Amber Heard			
Elinore Stone					Karen Bryson^{E}				
Nuidis Vulko					Willem Dafoe^{E}	Willem Dafoe			
Iris West^{2}					Kiersey Clemons^{E}				
Slade Wilson Deathstroke					Joe Manganiello				
=== Introduced in Aquaman ===
King Atlan The Dead King^{2}						Graham McTavish			
Queen Atlanna^{2}						Nicole Kidman			
The Brine King^{2}						John Rhys-Davies^{V}			
Thomas Curry^{2}^{U}						Temuera Morrison			
David Kane Black Manta^{2}						Yahya Abdul-Mateen II			
The Karathen						Julie Andrews^{C} ^{V}			
Jesse Kane						Michael Beach			
King Orm Ocean Master^{2}						Patrick Wilson			
Murk						Ludi Lin			
King Nereus^{2}						Dolph Lundgren			
Ricou The Fisherman King						Djimon Hounsou^{V}			
Rina The Fisherman Queen						Natalia Safran			
Scales The Fisherman Princess						Sophia Forrest			
Stephen Shin^{2}						Randall Park			
=== Introduced in Shazam! ===
Teth-Adam Black Adam^{2}							Dwayne Johnson^{C} ^{S} (Note: Black Adam briefly appears in the film as a CGI character during Billy and the Wizard's first meeting sequence, modeled in the likeness of Dwayne Johnson.)		
Billy Batson Shazam^{2}							Asher Angel Zachary Levi^{O}		
Mary Bromfield Mary Marvel^{2}							Grace Caroline Currey Michelle Borth^{O}		
Marilyn Batson							Caroline Palmer		
Eugene Choi^{2}							Ian Chen Ross Butler^{O}		
Darla Dudley^{2}							Faithe Herman Meagan Good^{O}		
Freddy Freeman^{2}							Jack Dylan Grazer Adam Brody^{O}		
Mister Mind^{2}							David F. Sandberg^{C} ^{V}		
Pedro Peña^{2}							Jovan Armand D. J. Cotrona^{O}		
Shazam The Wizard^{2}							Djimon Hounsou		
Thaddeus Sivana Doctor Sivana^{2}							Mark Strong Ethan Pugiotto^{Y}		
Mr. Sivana							John Glover		
Rosa Vásquez^{2}							Marta Milans		
Víctor Vásquez^{2}							Cooper Andrews		
Seven Deadly Sins							Steve Blum^{C} ^{V} Darin De Paul^{C} ^{V} Fred Tatasciore^{C} ^{V}		
=== Introduced in Birds of Prey ===
Maria Bertinelli								Charlene Amoia	
Happy								Matt Willig	
Helena Bertinelli Huntress								Mary Elizabeth Winstead Ella Mika^{Y}	
Cassandra Cain								Ella Jay Basco	
Dinah Lance Black Canary								Jurnee Smollett	
Renee Montoya								Rosie Perez	
Roman Sionis Black Mask								Ewan McGregor	
Victor Zsasz								Chris Messina	
=== Introduced in Wonder Woman 1984 ===
Barbara Ann Minerva Cheetah									Kristen Wiig
Maxwell Lorenzano Max Lord									Pedro Pascal
Alistair Lord									Lucian Perez
Asteria									Lynda Carter
Raquel									Gabriella Wilde
Simon Stagg									Oliver Cotton

== 2021–2023 ==
List indicators

This section includes characters who have appeared in the films.

- An empty grey cell indicates the character was not in the film.
- ^{C} indicates a cameo role.
- ^{O} indicates an older version of the character.
- ^{S} indicates an appearance through use of special effects.
- ^{V} indicates a voice-only role.
- ^{Y} indicates a younger version of the character.
- ^{TV} indicates the character appears in a DCEU television series.
- ^{A} indicates the character reappears in a film through the use of archival footage.
- ^{U} indicates the character has a Multiverse appearance outside of the DCEU or originates from an alternate reality.
- ^{R} indicates the character will appear in the rebooted DC Universe shared film universe portrayed by the same actor.These characters have been confirmed to be multiverse variants separate from their original DCEU counterparts.

Character	2021	2022	2023			
Character	The Suicide Squad	Black Adam	Shazam! Fury of the Gods	The Flash	Blue Beetle	Aquaman and the Lost Kingdom
=== Introduced in earlier films ===
Teth-Adam Black Adam		Dwayne Johnson				
Barry Allen The Flash^{TV} ^{U}				Ezra Miller Ian Loh^{Y} (Note: This actor plays two versions of the same character in the film, the original character from the DCEU main reality and their counterpart from an alternate universe.)		
Henry Allen^{U}				Ron Livingston (Note: This actor plays two versions of the same character in The Flash film, the original character from the DCEU main reality and his counterpart from an alternate universe.)		
King Atlan The Dead King						Vincent Regan
Queen Atlanna						Nicole Kidman
Billy Batson Shazam^{U}			Asher Angel Zachary Levi^{O}			
The Brine King						John Rhys-Davies^{S}^{V}
Mary Bromfield Mary Marvel			Grace Caroline Currey			
Eugene Choi			Ian Chen Ross Butler^{O}			
Arthur Curry Aquaman^{TV}				Jason Momoa^{C}		Jason Momoa
Thomas Curry^{U}				Temuera Morrison^{C} (Note: This actor plays two versions of the same character in The Flash film, the original character from the DCEU main reality and his counterpart from an alternate universe.)		Temuera Morrison
Darla Dudley			Faithe Herman Meagan Good^{O}			
Faora				Antje Traue		
Rick Flag^{R}	Joel Kinnaman					
Freddy Freeman			Jack Dylan Grazer Adam Brody^{O}			
George Harkness Captain Boomerang	Jai Courtney			Jai Courtney^{C} ^{S}		
Kal-El / Clark Kent Superman^{TV}		Henry Cavill^{C}		Henry Cavill^{C} ^{S} (Note: The actor’s likeness was digitally recreated for a cameo appearance in The Flash using CGI. Cavill filmed additional scenes as the character for the film, but they were removed during post-production.)		
David Kane Black Manta						Yahya Abdul-Mateen II
Jesse Kane						Michael Beach^{A}
Mera						Amber Heard
Mister Mind			David F. Sandberg^{C}^{V}			
Nam-Ek				^{S}		
King Nereus						Dolph Lundgren
King Orm Ocean Master						Patrick Wilson
Parademons				Michael Owusu^{S} ^{C}		
Alfred Pennyworth				Jeremy Irons		
Pedro Peña			Jovan Armand D. J. Cotrona			
Diana Prince Wonder Woman^{TV}			Gal Gadot^{C}	Gal Gadot^{C}		
Harleen Quinzel Harley Quinn	Margot Robbie					
Shazam The Wizard		Djimon Hounsou^{C}	Djimon Hounsou			
Stephen Shin						Randall Park
Thaddeus Sivana Doctor Sivana			Mark Strong^{C}			
Rosa Vásquez			Marta Milans			
The Seven Deadly Sins			^{C}			
Víctor Vásquez			Cooper Andrews			
Amanda Waller^{R} ^{TV}	Viola Davis	Viola Davis				
Bruce Wayne Batman				Ben Affleck		
Iris West				Kiersey Clemons		
General Zod				Michael Shannon		
=== Introduced in The Suicide Squad ===
Gunter Braun Javelin	Flula Borg					
Calendar Man	Sean Gunn					
Camila	Mikaela Hoover					
Flo Crawley	Tinashe Kajese					
Cleo Cazo Ratcatcher 2	Daniela Melchior					
Robert DuBois Bloodsport	Idris Elba					
Tyla DuBois	Storm Reid					
Brian Durlin Savant	Michael Rooker					
John Economos^{TV} ^{R}	Steve Agee		Steve Agee			
Dr. Fitzgibbon	John Ostrander					
Gaius Grieves The Thinker	Peter Capaldi					
Emilia Harcourt^{TV} ^{R}	Jennifer Holland	Jennifer Holland	Jennifer Holland			
Richard Hertz Blackguard	Pete Davidson					
Kaleidoscope	Natalia Safran					
Abner Krill Polka-Dot Man	David Dastmalchian					
Silvio Luna	Juan Diego Botto					
Milton	Julio Ruiz					
Mongal	Mayling Ng					
Nanaue King Shark^{R}	Sylvester Stallone^{V}					
Cory Pitzner The Detachable Kid	Nathan Fillion					
Ratcatcher	Taika Waititi					
Christopher Smith Peacemaker^{TV} ^{R}	John Cena					
Sol Soria	Alice Braga					
Mateo Suárez	Joaquín Cosío					
Weasel^{R}	Sean Gunn					
=== Introduced in Black Adam ===
Lady Blaze		Uncredited actress^{S}^{C}				
Ishmael Gregor Sabbac		Marwan Kenzari^{S}				
Carter Hall Hawkman		Aldis Hodge				
Maxine Hunkel Cyclone		Quintessa Swindell				
Hurut The Champion		Jalon Christian Uli Latukefu^{O}				
Kent Nelson Doctor Fate		Pierce Brosnan				
Al Pratt Atom Smasher I		Henry Winkler^{C}				
Albert Rothstein Atom Smasher II		Noah Centineo				
Shiruta		Odelya Halevi				
Adrianna Tomaz		Sarah Shahi				
Amon Tomaz		Bodhi Sabongui				
Karim Tomaz		Mohammed Amer				
=== Introduced in Shazam! Fury of the Gods ===
Anthea			Rachel Zegler			
Kalypso			Lucy Liu			
Hespera			Helen Mirren			
=== Introduced in The Flash ===
Barry Allen The Flash^{U} (Note: This version of the character, also played by Ezra Miller, originates from an alternate reality separate from that of the DCEU.)				Ezra Miller		
Nora Allen^{U}				Maribel Verdú		
Alberto Falcone				Luke Brandon Field		
Dick Grayson Robin^{U}				Burt Ward^{C} ^{S} (Note: This version of the character is that seen in the 1966 Batman TV series.)		
Jay Garrick The Flash^{U}				Jason Ballantine^{C} ^{S} (Note: This version of the character is the original Golden Age incarnation.)		
Bruce Wayne Batman^{U}				Michael Keaton (Note: This version of the character is that seen in the Tim Burton film series.) Adam West^{C} ^{S} (Note: This version of the character is that seen in the 1966 Batman TV series.) George Clooney^{C} (Note: This version of the character is that seen in the Batman & Robin film.)		
Kara Zor-El Supergirl^{U}				Sasha Calle Helen Slater^{C} ^{S} (Note: This version of the character is that seen in the Supergirl film.)		
Kal-El / Clark Kent Superman^{U}				Nicolas Cage^{C} (Note: This version of the character was set to appear in the unproduced Superman Lives! film.) Christopher Reeve^{C} ^{S} (Note: This version of the character is that seen in the Salkind film series.) George Reeves^{C}^{S} (Note: This version of the character is that seen in the Adventures of Superman TV series.)		
David Singh				Sanjeev Bhaskar		
Patty Spivot^{U}				Saoirse-Monica Jackson		
Albert Desmond^{U}				Rudy Mancuso		
=== Introduced in Blue Beetle ===
Alberto Reyes					Damián Alcázar	
Ignacio Carapax OMAC/The Indestructible Man					Raoul Trujillo	
Khaji-Da					Becky G^{V}	
Ted Kord Blue Beetle II					Bobby McGruther^{V}^{C} (Note: A key scene in the film shows a painting by Jenny's mother that reveals Ted Kord's likeness to be based on that of american actor Jason Sudeikis, per director Ángel Manuel Soto's wishes, as he hoped to cast him as Ted in a future sequel.)	
Victoria Kord					Susan Sarandon	
Nana					Adriana Barraza	
Jenny Kord					Bruna Marquezine	
Jaime Reyes Blue Beetle^{R}					Xolo Maridueña	
Milagro Reyes					Belissa Escobedo	
Rocío					Elpidia Carrillo	
César "Rudy" Reyes					George Lopez	
=== Introduced in Aquaman and the Lost Kingdom ===
Arthur Curry Jr.						Bodhi McCabe Maddox Cruz-Porter^{O}^{S}
Lady Karshon						Indya Moore
The Kingfish						Martin Short^{S}^{V}
King Kordax						Pilou Asbæk^{S}^{V}
Stingray						Jani Zhao

== Television series ==
List indicators

This section includes characters who have appeared in the series.

- An empty grey cell indicates the character was not in the series.
- ^{A} indicates an appearance through archival footage or audio.
- ^{C} indicates a cameo role.
- ^{V} indicates a voice-only role.
- ^{M} indicates the actor was part of the main cast.
- ^{R} indicates the character will appear in the rebooted DC Universe shared film universe portrayed by the same actor. These characters have been confirmed to be multiverse variants separate from their original DCEU counterparts.

Character	2022
Character	Peacemaker season 1
=== Introduced in films ===
Barry Allen The Flash	Ezra Miller^{C}
Flo Crawley^{R}	Tinashe Kajese^{C}
Arthur Curry Aquaman	Jason Momoa^{C}
John Economos^{R}	Steve Agee^{M}
Kal-El / Clark Kent Superman	Brad Abramenko (stand-in)^{C}
Rick Flag^{R}	Joel Kinnaman^{A}
Emilia Harcourt^{R}	Jennifer Holland^{M}
Diana Prince Wonder Woman	Kimberley von Ilberg (stand-in)^{C}
Christopher Smith Peacemaker^{R}	John Cena^{M} Quinn Bennett^{Y}
Amanda Waller^{R}	Viola Davis^{C}
=== Introduced in Peacemaker ===
Leota Adebayo^{R}	Danielle Brooks^{M}
Keeya Adebayo^{R}	Elizabeth Ludlow
Adrian Chase Vigilante^{R}	Freddie Stroma^{M}
Eagly^{R}	Dee Bradley Baker^{V}
Larry Fitzgibbon	Lochlyn Munro
Jamil	Rizwan Manji
Judomaster^{R}	Nhut Le
Caspar Locke	Christopher Heyerdahl
Clemson Murn Ik Nobb Llok	Chukwudi Iwuji^{M}
Auggie Smith The White Dragon^{R}	Robert Patrick^{M}
Sophie Song	Annie Chang

== See also ==
- Characters of the DC Extended Universe
