= Devoured (film) =

- Theatrical poster
- Directed by: Greg Olliver
- Written by: Marc Landau
- Starring: Marta Milans; Kara Jackson; Bruno Gunn
- Cinematography: Lyle Vincent
- Edited by: Greg Olliver
- Music by: Carly Paradis
- Production company: Secret Weapon Films
- Distributed by: Gravitas Ventures
- Release date: May 6, 2012 (Bilbao Fantasy Film Festival)
- Running time: 89 min
- Country: United States
- Languages: English, Spanish

Devoured is a 2012 dramatic horror film that was directed by Greg Olliver and is his feature film directorial debut. The film had its world premiere on May 6, 2012 at the Bilbao Fantasy Film Festival and stars Marta Milans as a hardworking young woman that begins to experience strange visions.

== Synopsis ==
Lourdes (Marta Milans) is a young woman from El Salvador that has come to New York City in hopes of raising enough money to help care for her ill son, who lives with Lourdes's mother back in her home country. She works in an upscale restaurant where her boss mistreats her, her boss's boyfriend sexually assaults her, and various men forcefully solicit her for sexual favors. Lourdes endures all of this as she cannot afford to lose her job and while she is reluctant to prostitute herself, she will do anything in order to raise enough money for her son's surgery. Her only solace is found in her phone calls to her son in El Salvador and her interactions with Frankie (Bruno Gunn), a firefighter that is the only person in New York who has shown Lourdes any true kindness. While cleaning the restaurant one night, Lourdes begins to experience strange visions where she sees strange shadowy figures that seem out to get her.

== Cast ==
- Marta Milans as Lourdes
- Kara Jackson as Kristen
- Bruno Gunn as Friendly Frankie Callahan
- Tyler Hollinger as Billy
- Luis Harris as Oliver
- Sal Rendino as Henry
- David Conley as Detective Cruthers
- Jim O'Hare as Man in Black
- Richard Alleman as Man Eating Alone
- Eric Lommel as Kitchen Staff #1
- Dixon Gutierrez as Kitchen Staff #2
- Rennel Turner as Officer #1
- Jaime Carrillo as Officer #2
- Annie Lee Moffett as Lourdes' Old Friend
- Amy Landon as Detective Sullivan

== Reception ==
Critical reception for Devoured has been predominantly positive, and the film has received praise from multiple horror review websites. Opinions were polarized on the film's pacing, which some reviewers felt could deter some viewers while others saw it as adding to the movie's overall feel.

=== Awards ===
- Best Director Award at the New York City Horror Film Festival (2012, won)
- Best Actress Award at the New York City Horror Film Festival (2012, won - Marta Milans)
