= Killer Women =

American crime drama television series

- Genre: Crime drama
- Based on: Mujeres Asesinas
- Developed by: Hannah Shakespeare
- Starring: Tricia Helfer; Marc Blucas; Alex Fernandez; Marta Milans; Michael Trucco
- Composer: Mark Kilian
- Country of origin: United States
- Original language: English
- No. of seasons: 1
- No. of episodes: 8

Production
- Executive producers: Hannah Shakespeare; Sofía Vergara; Ben Silverman; Luis Balaguer; Martin Campbell
- Running time: 42 minutes
- Production companies: Electus; LatinWE; ABC Studios

Original release
- Network: ABC
- Release: January 7 – March 25, 2014

Related
- Mujeres Asesinas (Argentina); Mujeres Asesinas (Mexico)

Killer Women is an American crime drama television series that aired on ABC from January 7 to March 25, 2014. The series is based on the Argentine crime drama Mujeres Asesinas, which was adapted into an American setting by writer Hannah Shakespeare. Shakespeare also served as an executive producer alongside Sofía Vergara, Ben Silverman, Luis Balaguer, and Martin Campbell for Pol-Ka Productions, Silverman's Electus Productions, Vergara and Balaguer's Latin World Entertainment, and ABC Studios. The series stars Tricia Helfer. The pilot episode was directed by Lawrence Trilling.

On May 9, 2014, ABC cancelled the series after one season.

== Premise ==
The series follows the life of Molly Parker, a former beauty queen and daughter of a sheriff who is recently separated from her abusive State Senator husband. She rises to the top ranks of one of the most elite and male-dominated law enforcement establishments, the Texas Rangers. The perpetrators of the episodic crimes she solves are all female.

== Cast and characters ==
=== Main cast ===
- Tricia Helfer as Molly Parker, a Texas Ranger
- Marc Blucas as Dan Winston, a DEA agent and Molly's love interest
- Alex Fernandez as Luis Zea, Molly's boss
- Michael Trucco as Billy Parker, Molly's brother
- Marta Milans as Becca Parker, Billy's wife
- Seina Agudong as Lulu Parker, Becca and Billy’s daughter

=== Guest stars ===
- Nadine Velazquez as Martina Alvarez
- Beth Riesgraf as Jennifer Jennings
- Melora Hardin as Nan Reed
- Jeffrey Nordling as Jake Colton
- Vincent Fuentes as Paco La Mosca
- Paul Howard Smith as Sherriff Lloyd Watkins
- Aisha Hinds as FBI Agent Linda Clark
- Peyton McDavitt as Andrea Corbett
- Paola Turbay as Carmen Garza
- Alexandra Pomales as Hailee Parker
- Michael Shamus Wiles as Colt Ritter
- Arlin Alcala as Nurse Sanchez
- Matt Holmes as Augie Travis

== Episodes ==
No.	Title	Directed by	Written by	Original release date	U.S. viewers (millions)
1	"La Sicaria"	Lawrence Trilling	Hannah Shakespeare	January 7, 2014	3.96
When Martina Alvarez (Nadine Velazquez) shoots and kills an ADA on her wedding day, it appears to be a case of jealous rage, until Texas Ranger Molly Parker finds several elements of Martina's story that don't add up. Molly also discovers from her new love interest, DEA agent Dan Winston, that the DEA had an upcoming meeting scheduled with the ADA. Meanwhile, Molly tries to get her estranged husband, State Senator Jake Colton, to sign divorce papers, which he's refused to do for over six months.
2	"Some Men Need Killing"	Marc Roskin	Hannah Shakespeare	January 14, 2014	3.51
A wealthy water park owner is murdered by a professional hitman at a function that Molly and Dan are attending, and suspicion falls on the man's wife, Nan (Melora Hardin), when Molly discovers that he controlled every aspect of her life. But after Nan reveals that the hitman approached her, not the other way around, Molly finds a common thread connecting this murder to similar killings—just in time for Molly to save her abusive husband Jake from becoming the next victim. Becca suspects that Billy has been cheating, as he keeps running out at night.
3	"Warrior"	Martha Coolidge	Jason Ning	January 21, 2014	3.62
A series of bank robberies have been attributed to a decorated Army veteran, Andrea Corbett (Peyton McDavitt), who always gives away the money to another veteran that she feels has been wronged. FBI Agent Clark (Aisha Hinds) allows Molly to assist in the capture of Corbett, but the two soon disagree on how to handle the situation when Corbett takes a hostage. Meanwhile, Molly's refusal to attend court-ordered marriage counseling with Jake becomes an issue when Jake fights back by serving a subpoena to Dan, which would jeopardize Dan's status as an undercover DEA agent. Luis later informs Molly that Dan has been shot. Molly also confronts Billy about a lie he told to Becca, presuming that he is covering up an affair.
4	"The Siren"	David Grossman	Jonathan Kidd & Sonya Winton	February 4, 2014	3.12
Molly hunts a serial killer who murders women after shaving their heads and eyebrows, then dresses them in men's clothing. The victims are all individuals who remind the killer, Carmen Garza (Paola Turbay), of her own abusive mother. Meanwhile, Molly introduces Dan to her family for the first time, as Dan has to recover from a mild gunshot wound and a concussion. While Becca and Hailee are out shopping for Hailee's quinceañera, Molly unknowingly introduces her sister-in-law to the killer. Elsewhere, Billy reveals he has taken on extra work because the ranch has not been lucrative, which explains his nightly absences from the home.
5	"In and Out"	Marc Roskin	Jonathan Kidd & Sonya Winton	February 11, 2014	3.03
Three masked intruders rob the home of a star basketball player from the San Antonio Spurs, and when the man returns home in the middle of the invasion he is struck on the head with one of his trophies and killed. Molly discovers the married player was sleeping with the wives of two teammates, until he met a nurse at a children's hospital and the affairs stopped. Meanwhile, Dan investigates a drug cartel that is smuggling cocaine into Texas in an unusual manner, inside of cattle. He and several DEA officers set up a blockade and stop a cattle truck, and Dan is shocked to find Billy driving the truck.
6	"Demons"	Colin Bucksey	Heather Zuhlke	Unaired on television Released online – March 30, 2014	N/A
To avoid jail time Billy makes a deal with Dan to help the DEA collar the leader of the drug cartel. Molly has to conduct a dangerous pursuit into the wilderness to catch a mentally disturbed native-american woman who robbed and killed a gasstation owner.
7	"Daughter of the Alamo"	David Grossman	Sal Calleros	February 18, 2014	3.22
Molly has decided to tell her family and the divorce judge about Jake's abuse. Billy's deal to help the DEA against the drug cartel backfires when his youngest daughter is taken hostage by the cartel. Molly makes an arrest that leads to a tip in a murder case that has been unsolved for over 10 years. She then has to work with the original officer assigned to the case, an old-school, now-retired Ranger named Colt Ritter (Michael Shamus Wiles), to track down the perpetrator.
8	"Queen Bee"	Colin Bucksey	Hannah Shakespeare	Unaired on television Released online – March 30, 2014	N/A
When Molly finally learns about Billy's involvement with the drug cartel she combines forces with the DEA to solve the hostage situation and catch the cartel leaders.

== Critical response ==
The series premiere was panned by critic Tim Goodman, who wrote: "Killer Women wants to be styled as a kind of cheap, broadcast network knockoff of Quentin Tarantino or something, but ends up redefining 'hokey' in the process." ABC initially placed an eight-episode order for Killer Women, but after low ratings for the first two episodes, especially in the 18–49 demographic (0.9 and 0.7), the first season run was shortened to six episodes. Episode 7 was aired on February 18 as series finale instead of episode 6, because it provided a better ending with the granting of Molly's divorce. As a result, ABC moved up the premiere of the rookie drama Mind Games from March 11 to February 25.
