= Asher (film) =

- Film poster
- Directed by: Michael Caton-Jones
- Written by: Jay Zaretsky
- Produced by: Ron Perlman; Josh Crook; Kirk Michael Fellows; Adam Folk; Joseph Mensch; Brian Wilkins
- Starring: Ron Perlman; Famke Janssen; Jacqueline Bisset
- Cinematography: Denis Crossan
- Edited by: István Király; Tomi Szabo
- Music by: Simon Boswell
- Distributed by: Momentum Pictures
- Release dates: October 4, 2018 (Sitges Film Festival); December 7, 2018
- Running time: 94 minutes
- Country: United States
- Language: English

Asher (titled Hitman: Redemption in the UK) is a 2018 American action thriller film directed by Michael Caton-Jones and starring Ron Perlman in the title role. It was written by Jay Zaretsky.

== Premise ==
Asher is an Israeli former Mossad agent turned gun-for-hire, living an austere life in an ever-changing Brooklyn. Approaching the end of his career, he breaks the oath he took as a young man, when he meets Sophie on a hit gone wrong. In order to have love in his life before it is too late, he must kill the man he was, for a chance at becoming the man he wants to be.

== Cast ==
- Ron Perlman as Asher
- Famke Janssen as Sophie
- Peter Facinelli as Uziel
- Marta Milans as Marina
- Richard Dreyfuss as Avi
- Jacqueline Bisset as Dora
- Ned Eisenberg as Abram
- Guy Burnet as Lyor
- William Perry as Black Fella
- Blake Perlman as Hannah
- Joseph Siprut as Craig
- Bobby Daniel Rodriguez as Latin Man
- Charles DelGatto as Bodega Clerk

== Production ==
Filming began in the Syracuse, New York, area in August 2017.

== Reception ==
=== Box office ===
The film grossed $2,846 with home DVD sales plus $1,290 home Blu-Ray sales for a total of $4,145 domestic video sales.

=== Critical response ===
On review aggregator website Rotten Tomatoes, the film holds an approval rating of 46% based on 13 reviews and an average rating of 6.6/10. On Metacritic, the film has a weighted average score of 58 out of 100, based on 6 critics, indicating "mixed or average" reviews.
