= Marta Milans =

Spanish and American actress

- Citizenship: Spain; United States (from 2020)
- Occupation: Actress
- Years active: 2006–present

Marta Milans is a Spanish and American actress. She had her breakout role in the film Devoured (2012) and landed a main role in the ABC series Killer Women (2014). She is known for playing Rosa Vasquez in the DC Extended Universe film Shazam! (2019) and its sequel (2023).

== Early life ==
Milans attended a British school and then a German school. In 2003, her family founded a goat farm and creamery called Santa Gadea in the northern Province of Burgos, which they run to this day. Milans herself became vice president of the company. At 19, Milans began studying theatre and art history at New York University (NYU). She has said that if she did not become an actress, she would have worked at the Metropolitan Museum of Art.

== Career ==
Milans played a leading role in the horror film Devoured.

Milans co-starred in the 2013 drama film The Disappearance of Eleanor Rigby and in 2014 was series regular in the short-lived ABC crime drama series Killer Women. In 2016, she co-starred opposite Gina Torres in the ABC pilot The Death of Eva Sofia Valdez. Milans later returned to Spain to star in the Movistar+ drama series El embarcadero. She also appeared in American films Asher (2018) and Shazam! (2019).

== Personal life ==
Milans divides her time between Spain, New York, and Los Angeles. She also travels frequently, and considers Amsterdam, the Scottish Highlands, Budapest, and Kenya to be among her favourite destinations. On 13 March 2020, Milans announced that she became an American citizen.

Milans married her husband Jamie Munro in 2022.

== Filmography ==
=== Film ===
| Year | Film | Role | Notes |
|---|---|---|---|
| 2006 | Love in the Age of Dion | Carol | |
| 2007 | Luchador Love | Nina | Short film |
| 2009 | Scandal | Natalia Romero | Short film |
| 2011 | Shame | Cocktail Waitress | |
| 2012 | Devoured | Lourdes | New York City Horror Film Festival Award for Best Actress; Nominated — Fangoria Chainsaw Award for Best Actress |
| 2013 | The Disappearance of Eleanor Rigby | Phoebe | |
| 2018 | Asher | Marina | |
| 2019 | Shazam! | Rosa Vásquez | |
| 2021 | Stoyan | Maika | |
| 2023 | Shazam! Fury of the Gods | Rosa Vásquez | |

=== Television ===
| Year | Film | Role | Notes |
|---|---|---|---|
| 2010 | La piel azul | Carlota | |
| 2010 | Valientes | Alba Varela | 46 episodes |
| 2011 | Law & Order: Special Victims Unit | Imelda Barros | Episode: "Bang" |
| 2014 | Killer Women | Becca Parker | Series regular, 8 episodes |
| 2016 | The Death of Eva Sofia Valdez | Alegria Valdez | Unsold TV pilot |
| 2016 | The Mysteries of Laura | Valeria Hernandez | Episode: "The Mystery of the Political Operation" |
| 2016 | High Maintenance | Solange | Episode: "Tick" |
| 2016–2017 | No Tomorrow | Sofia | 4 episodes |
| 2017 | Vergüenza | Elena | |
| 2019–2020 | El embarcadero | Katia | Series regular |
| 2020 | White Lines | Kika | Series regular |
| 2020 | The Ministry of Time | Laura | 1 episode |
| 2020 | The Favorite of Midas | Lead Role | Miniseries |
