= Masur =

Masur can mean:

- Masurians or Masurs, a small European ethnic group
- Masur (surname)
- Masur, India, a town in Maharashtra state
- Masur, Iran, a village in Lorestan Province
- Masur, Yemen
- Masur (lentil)
- Masur-e Abi also known as Māsūr

== See also ==
- Mazur (disambiguation)
