= Mazurkiewicz =

Mazurkiewicz, Mazurkievič, or Mazurkievich is a surname with variants in a number of languages. It is derived from mazurek. The surname is found across Poland. Related surnames include Mazurek and Mazur.

Language	Masculine	Feminine
Polish	Mazurkiewicz ([mazurˈkjɛvit͡ʂ])	
Belarusian (Romanization)	Мазуркевіч (Mazurkievič, Mazurkievich)	
Latvian	Mazurkevičs, Mazurkēvičs	Mazurkeviča, Mazurkēviča
Lithuanian	Mazurkevičius	Mazurkevičienė (married); Mazurkevičiūtė (unmarried)
Russian (Romanization)	Мазуркевич (Mazurkevich, Mazurkevitch)	
Ukrainian (Romanization)	Мазуркевич (Mazurkevych, Mazurkevyč)	

== People ==
- Antoni Mazurkiewicz (born 1934), computer scientist, inventor of the trace theory
- Jan Mazurkiewicz (1896–1988), Polish underground soldier during WW2 and later a general
- Ladislao Mazurkiewicz (1945–2013), Uruguayan football goalkeeper
- Paul Mazurkiewicz (born 1968), drummer of the band Cannibal Corpse
- Robert Mazurkiewicz (born 1954), Polish actor
- Stefan Mazurkiewicz (1888–1945), Polish mathematician
- Tomasz Mazurkiewicz (born 1981), Polish footballer
- Władysław Mazurkiewicz (1871–1933), Polish physician
- Władysław Mazurkiewicz (1911–1945), Polish serial killer
