= Clayface (film) =

2026 DC Studios film

- Theatrical release poster
- Directed by: James Watkins
- Screenplay by: Mike Flanagan; Hossein Amini
- Story by: Mike Flanagan
- Based on: Characters from DC
- Produced by: Matt Reeves; Lynn Harris; James Gunn; Peter Safran
- Starring: Tom Rhys Harries; Naomi Ackie; David Dencik; Max Minghella; Eddie Marsan
- Cinematography: Rob Hardy
- Edited by: Jon Harris
- Music by: Volker Bertelmann
- Production companies: DC Studios; 6th & Idaho
- Distributed by: Warner Bros. Pictures
- Release dates: October 13, 2026 (Los Angeles); October 23, 2026 (United States)
- Running time: 108 minutes
- Country: United States
- Language: English
- Budget: $30–44 million
- Box office: $126.2 million

Clayface is a 2026 American body horror film based on the eponymous character from DC Comics. Directed by James Watkins from a screenplay by Mike Flanagan and Hossein Amini, it is the third film in the DC Universe (DCU). Tom Rhys Harries stars as Matt Hagen / Clayface, alongside Naomi Ackie, David Dencik, Max Minghella, and Eddie Marsan. In the film, after becoming disfigured by a mobster (Dencik), rising actor Matt Hagen seeks help from a scientist (Ackie) to restore his appearance, but the procedure transforms him into a shapeshifting creature. It is produced by Matt Reeves and Lynn Harris alongside James Gunn and Peter Safran of DC Studios.

After expressing interest in a Clayface film both publicly and to DC Films for their DC Extended Universe (DCEU) franchise, Flanagan pitched the project to the newly formed DC Studios in March 2023. The film and Flanagan's involvement were confirmed in December 2024 as part of the DCU, the successor to the DCEU. Flanagan was unable to direct the film due to scheduling issues. Watkins was hired in February 2025, Amini was rewriting the script by May, and Rhys Harries was cast in June. Additional casting took place in the following months. Filming lasted from the end of August until the start of November 2025, taking place on location throughout Liverpool and on soundstages at Warner Bros. Studios Leavesden in England.

Clayface premiered at the Hollywood Legion Theater in Los Angeles on October 13, 2026, and was released by Warner Bros. Pictures in the United States on October 23, 2026. It is part of the DCU's Chapter One: Gods and Monsters. Critics gave the film generally positive reviews, praising Rhys Harries's performance and the practical body-horror effects, but some criticized its script and visual effects. It has grossed $124.2 million worldwide.

== Plot ==
After being nominated for an Academy Award, actor Matt Hagen attends a party with his childhood friend and fellow actor Corey Bowery. There, he meets actress Mia Torrez and spends the night with her despite Corey's warning that she is the girlfriend of crime lord Markos Szabo. The next morning, Szabo and his men ambush Matt and disfigure his face with a knife. Although Matt reports the attack to the police, Szabo avoids prosecution due to a lack of evidence and control over the corrupt Gotham police. Mia later falsely claims in a television interview that Matt had drugged her. Unable to find work due to his appearance and Mia's allegations, Matt runs out of money and returns to his childhood home in the Gotham City slums.

After multiple botched surgeries, Matt learns of Caitlyn Corr, a doctor who is developing a nanite treatment capable of rapidly healing damaged tissue and skin. Caitlyn initially hesitates to use Matt as a test subject, but her fiancé, detective John Borrelli, who is investigating Szabo, encourages her to help him. The treatment initially succeeds, allowing Matt to return to public life with his face apparently restored. When his face begins melting during a red carpet event, however, Matt panics and returns to Caitlyn. Against her wishes, he injects himself with a larger dose of nanites, seemingly curing the problem.

Matt subsequently discovers that he can instantly recover from any injury. Although thrilled by his abilities, Caitlyn grows concerned. While flying home after visiting Corey, Matt learns from a news broadcast that his former manager, Frank Fitzpatrick, now works for Mia and Szabo. Matt briefly loses control of his powers but, with Caitlyn's guidance, discovers that he can alter his facial features and voice to impersonate anyone. He confronts Frank, who admits to betraying him to conceal his embezzlement of Matt's earnings, and reveals that Corey helped him ruin Matt's reputation. Unable to fully control his powers, Matt accidentally kills Frank and assumes his appearance to escape, then tracks down and willingly murders a remorseful Corey by suffocating him inside his body.

John begins to suspect Szabo of the killings, prompting Szabo to threaten both John and Caitlyn. When Caitlyn visits Matt, he confesses he loves her, but she hesitates to reciprocate due to her relationship with John. After one of Szabo's men follows Caitlyn, Matt kills him and infiltrates Szabo's club, massacring the gang before confronting Szabo and Mia. Matt forces part of his body into Mia's throat, suffocating her. He then cuts his own face in a manner identical to how Szabo's men had disfigured it and lets his blood drip onto Szabo's face. As Matt's wounds regenerate, the nanites in his blood crush and dissolve Szabo's face, killing him.

With Szabo's criminal empire destroyed, John visits Matt to verify his whereabouts. Caitlyn realizes that Matt is responsible for the murders and returns home to tell John everything. After the conversation, she discovers the real John's corpse and realizes that she has been speaking to Matt in disguise. Convinced that their romantic feelings are mutual, Matt declares that they can finally be together and attempts to kiss her. Horrified, Caitlyn attacks him with a taser and activates the nanites' "kill switch", causing his body to melt away into the sewers, while Caitlyn informs the police. Unable to find any trace of him, the authorities dismiss her account. Matt is declared missing, and Caitlyn abandons her research.

Later, Caitlyn gives a dollar to a homeless man, unaware that he is Matt, who survived and is living in Gotham's sewers. Using his clay-like flesh, Matt creates a replica of Caitlyn and acts out a scenario in which they reconcile and kiss. As he transforms into a hulking form, Matt roars in rage.

== Cast ==
- Tom Rhys Harries as Matt Hagen / Clayface: An actor who is transformed into a shapeshifting creature after undergoing an experimental treatment
- Naomi Ackie as Dr. Caitlyn Corr: A fringe scientist and Matt's love interest who creates the treatment he undergoes
- David Dencik as Markos Szabo: A mobster who disfigures Matt
- Max Minghella as John Borrelli: A Gotham City police detective who is engaged to Caitlyn
- Eddie Marsan as Frank Fitzpatrick: Matt's manager

Other cast members include Nancy Carroll as Hildie Love, Matt's agent; Joshua James as Corey Bowery, Matt's best friend and a fellow movie star; Wil Coban as Bones; Joana Ribeiro as Mia Torrez, Markos's lover; and Rob Brydon as Vic Chissler, a chat show host. Aaron Paul makes an uncredited cameo appearance as Jimmy Hagen, Matt's abusive father.

== Production ==
=== Development ===
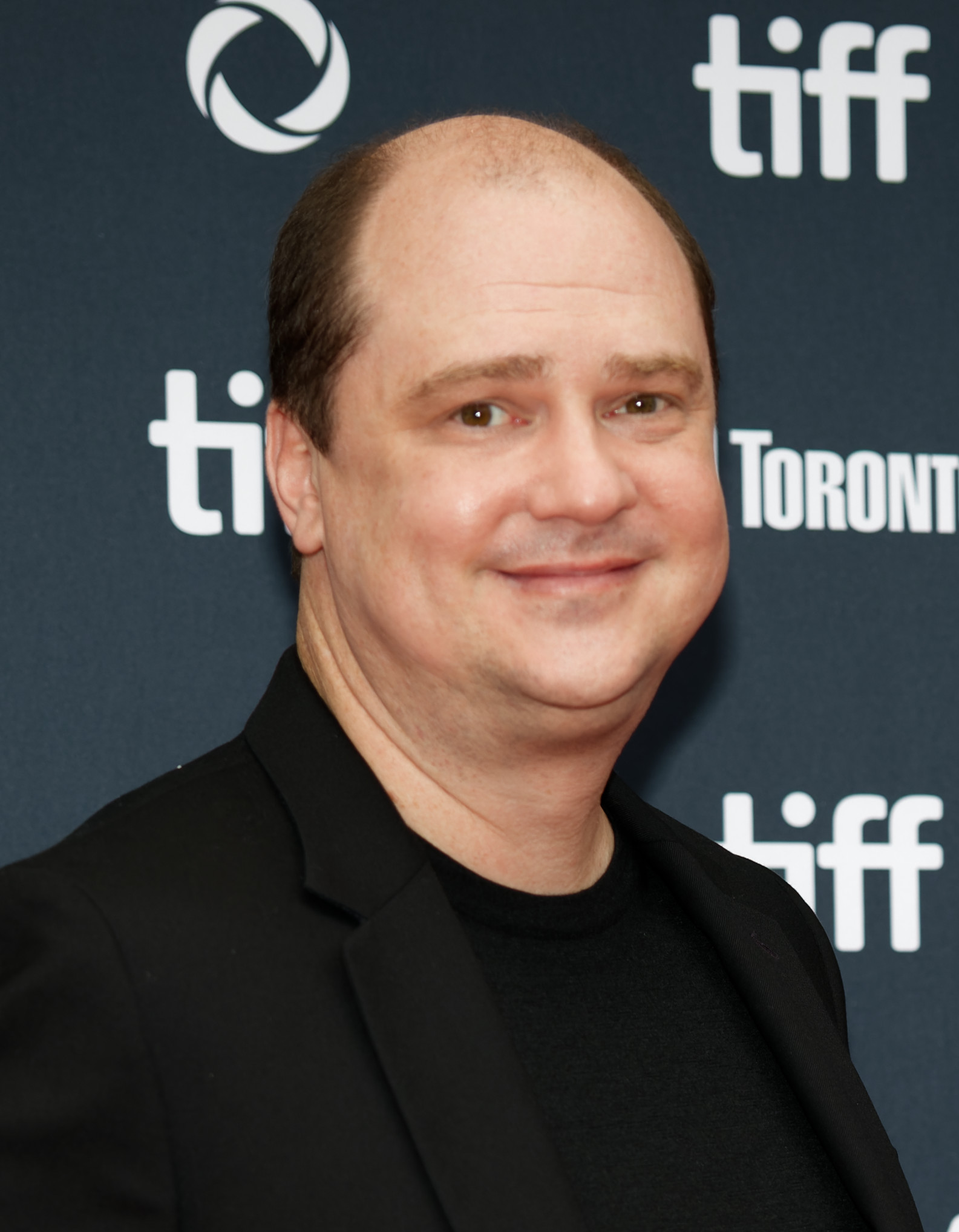
Writer Mike Flanagan discussed making a Clayface film with DC numerous times before it was greenlit due to the strength of his pitch.

In January 2021, filmmaker Mike Flanagan publicly expressed interest in making a standalone film focused on the DC Comics character Clayface. Being a fan of the character's depiction in the Batman: The Animated Series two-part episode "Feat of Clay" (1992), in which he was voiced by Ron Perlman, Flanagan wanted the project to be a horror film that was also a thriller and a tragedy. He previously discussed making a "horror-leaning" Clayface film for the DC Extended Universe (DCEU) franchise in a general meeting with DC Films producer Jon Berg. Flanagan felt the meeting "kind of went nowhere", and said DC did not "bite on" his idea, but he was ready to commit to the project at any time.

Discovery, Inc. and Warner Bros.' parent company WarnerMedia—the owner of DC—merged in April 2022 to become Warner Bros. Discovery (WBD), led by president and CEO David Zaslav. The new company was expected to restructure DC Entertainment and Zaslav began searching for an equivalent to Marvel Studios president Kevin Feige to lead the new subsidiary. Writer/director James Gunn and producer Peter Safran were announced as the co-chairs and co-CEOs of the newly formed DC Studios at the end of October 2022. A week after starting their new roles, the pair had begun planning a new DC Universe (DCU) that would be a "soft reboot" of the DCEU. By the time they were hired, filmmaker Matt Reeves was meeting with directors and writers about multiple potential film and television spin-offs related to his standalone DC film The Batman (2022). These projects were in early development and centered on members of Batman's rogues gallery, such as Clayface. The Batman and its spin-offs were expected to be kept separate from the new DCU shared universe under the "DC Elseworlds" label.

In March 2023, Flanagan and his Intrepid Pictures partner Trevor Macy met with Gunn and Safran to pitch a Clayface film in which the character would not be portrayed as a villain like he is in the comics. At that time, the character was expected to appear in Reeves's The Batman: Part II (2028) but Flanagan did not pitch his project as being connected to Reeves's films. It was unclear at the time whether the film would be part of the DCU or the Elseworlds label if it moved forward. Flanagan said the report was "entirely speculative", and in May, he added that a Clayface film was not in development and he was participating in the 2023 Writers Guild of America strike. In August, the film was reported to be in development with Flanagan as writer and director. Reeves, Gunn, and Safran were listed as producers. Clayface was introduced to the DCU in the first season of the animated series Creature Commandos (2024–25), the first DCU project to be released, with Alan Tudyk providing the character's voice after previously doing so for a different version of Clayface in the unrelated animated series Harley Quinn (2019–present).

DC Studios officially greenlit Clayface in December 2024, as part of the DCU. Gunn explained that he had not planned to make a film about Clayface, but was won over by Flanagan's pitch and subsequent script drafts. Filming was expected to begin in early 2025 and the studio was searching for a different director due to Flanagan's commitments to the 2027 film The Exorcist: Martyrs and the 2026 series Carrie. Flanagan said he enjoyed developing the project with Reeves, and then with Gunn and Safran, and this was the first time in his career where he had to leave a project he was passionate about due to scheduling concerns. Several days after the greenlight was revealed, the studio scheduled the film for release on September 11, 2026. Gunn, Safran, and Reeves were confirmed to be producing alongside Lynn Harris of Reeves's company, 6th & Idaho Motion Picture Company. The film was intended to be produced on a "stripped down" budget of around $40 million; it was subsequently reported to have a budget around the $30 million range. Safran said the film would not have a campy tone and instead compared it to the horror film The Fly (1986).

=== Pre-production ===
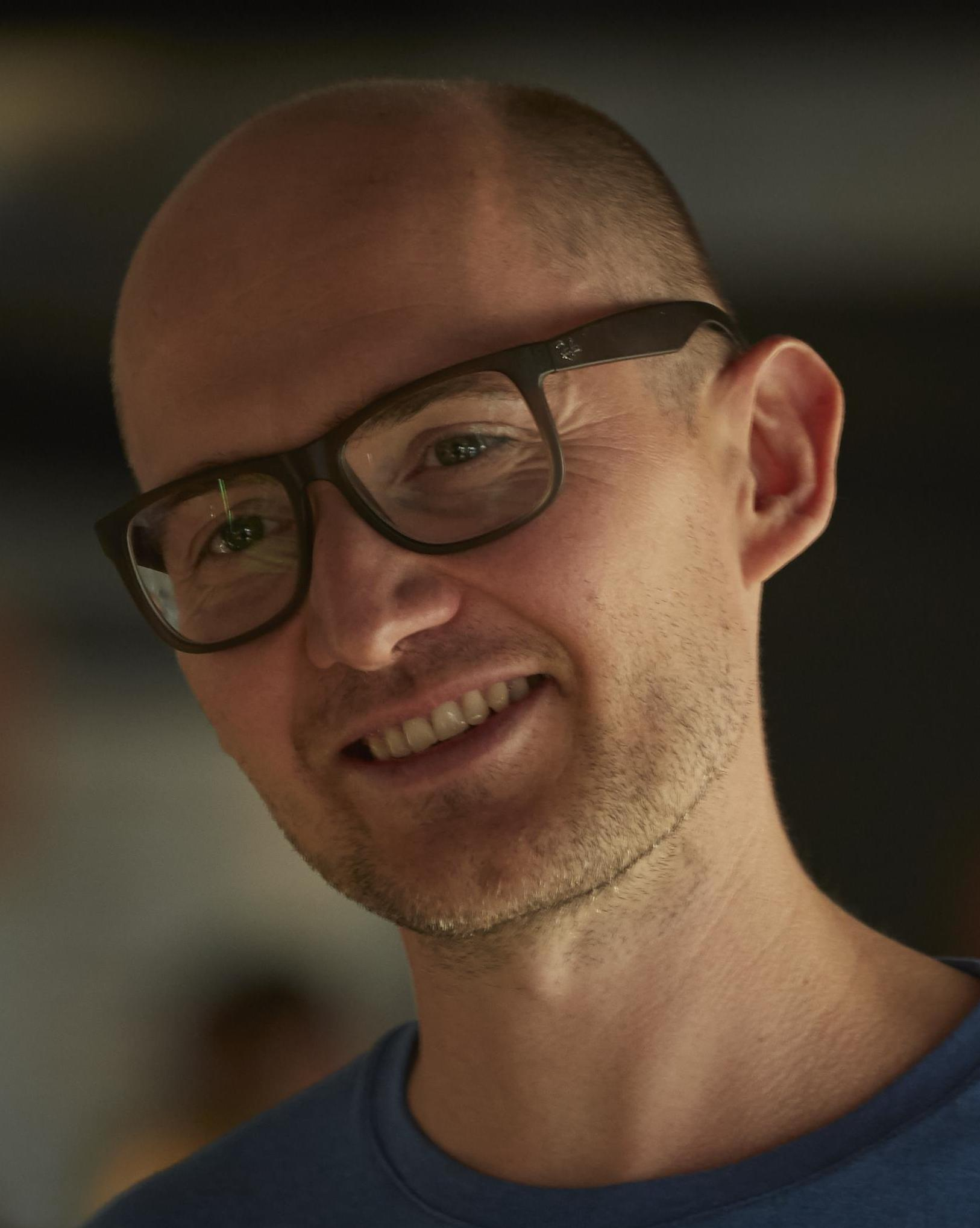
James Watkins was hired to direct Clayface after writer Mike Flanagan was unable to due to other commitments.

DC Studios was eyeing J. A. Bayona to direct the film by the end of 2024. The studio was set to hear pitches from potential directors in the week of February 17, 2025, including James Watkins. Casting had begun by then, and the director was expected to be involved in that process once they were hired. Demián Rugna was also approached, but declined because he was not familiar with the character and was not interested in making a superhero film. Anthony D'Alessandro and Justin Kroll at Deadline Hollywood reported that Jeff Wadlow was also on the list of potential directors, but Aaron Couch and Borys Kit of The Hollywood Reporter said Wadlow was never in the mix. They added that the film was considering potential production locations in North America, unlike other DC Studios films that were based in the United Kingdom, due to its lower budget. The film was described as a "Hollywood horror story" about the original incarnation of Clayface, and was expected to be set in both Hollywood and Gotham City. It was unclear whether filming would take place in Los Angeles following the January 2025 Southern California wildfires. Watkins entered negotiations to direct on February 21 after he gave a final presentation to Gunn the day before.

A few days after Watkins's selection was revealed, Gunn and Safran confirmed that he was in talks to direct, casting was underway, and the film would be part of the DCU's Chapter One: Gods and Monsters slate. They were aiming to start filming in the middle of 2025. Safran called it "an origin story for a classic Batman villain that we want to have" in the DCU, and Gunn hoped it would work for horror fans who were not interested in DC, describing it as a body horror film. He said Tudyk would not reprise his role as Clayface, despite Gunn's intention to have the same actors portraying characters across different mediums, because the character was not Tudyk's "primary role" in the DCU; Tudyk primarily voiced Alex Sartorius / Doctor Phosphorus in Creature Commandos. Gunn also stated the film's events occurred before that of Superman (2025), and that its standalone story would also be "very connected" to the overarching DCU narrative. Safran later confirmed that it both took place before the first season of Creature Commandos (2024) and that both iterations of Clayface were the same character. Daniel Radcliffe, who starred in Watkin's 2012 film The Woman in Black, was reported by journalist Jeff Sneider later in February to be one of two actors eyed to portray Clayface in the film, but Gunn said Radcliffe was not being considered. The next month, Sneider reported that another writer had joined the film to perform a "significant pass" on Flanagan's script.

By April 2025, the start of filming was pushed to that October. Hossein Amini, who co-created the television series McMafia (2018) with Watkins, was revealed to be rewriting the script a month later. Watkins said Flanagan's earlier drafts featured "mythic things within the shape-shifting world of [Hagen]. Questions of our humanity — how we lose our humanity and what it means to be a monster." He added that the script significantly evolved from this once Amini joined. Flanagan confirmed that he was no longer involved and said he expected Watkins to "make it [his] own", but he hoped the film would remain true to the spirit of what he originally wanted it to be. Safran described Clayface as "lean[ing] into horror and psychological thriller in a way that definitely differentiates it from more traditional superhero entries, while still being anchored in what I would say is a recognizable character," with Harries adding, "It asks, How far would you go to reclaim your life that you've built?" Reeves likewise described the film as a grounded "tragic character journey wrapped in terrifying body horror". Tom Blyth, George MacKay, Jack O'Connell, and Leo Woodall were in the running and read for the title role in early June, but Gunn and Safran "weren't ready to pull the trigger" on any of those actors and decided to widen the search. Later that month, Gunn announced that relative newcomer Tom Rhys Harries had been cast as Clayface "after a long and incredibly exhaustive search", which Safran estimated saw "hundreds" of actors considered, but said they did not intend on casting a high-profile star and were rather focused on finding the best performer for the role. Rhys Harries informally met with Watkins after his initial audition to discuss the role before reading the script and screen testing. Safran said the producers were impressed by Rhys Harries's audition and screen test. Amini completed multiple drafts by then, and Gunn said the script was entirely Flanagan's story with minor changes being made to finalize the shooting script. The film was intended to receive an R-rating from the Motion Picture Association. The character Matt Hagen, the second incarnation of Clayface in the comics, was expected to appear. Filming was set to take place at DC Studios' production hub at Warner Bros. Studios Leavesden in England. By early July, filming had reportedly been moved up to start the following month.

In the week of July 14, reading sessions for the film's female lead were held in England. Naomi Ackie emerged as the top choice for the role and was set to enter formal talks the next week. Her casting as the scientist who creates Clayface was confirmed a month later, when Max Minghella was in final talks to join the cast as a Gotham City police detective who is dating Ackie's character. James Price was the production designer, after previously working with Watkins on his film Speak No Evil (2024), while Keith Madden was the costume designer. Watkins said he and Gunn wanted to give Gotham City's design "certain impressiveness and corruption to it and dirt to it" while being colorful to avoid feeling "murky". He specifically highlighted using tungsten lighting as "orange sodium vapor-type light that creates a real atmosphere". He added that while visual background references alluded to wider aspects of Batman's rogues gallery, they were primarily "little Easter eggs for those really in the know" that would not detract from the story. Watkins also chose to include visual references to previous horror films, such as The Fly for the evolution of Hagen's physical transformation, The Invisible Man (1933) and House of Wax (1953) for different facial coverings worn by Hagen, and Frankenstein (1931) for the initial scarring of Hagen's face.

=== Filming ===
Principal photography began on August 31, 2025, in Liverpool, England, under the working title Corinthians. Rob Hardy was the cinematographer, returning from the DCU film Supergirl (2026). Rhys Harries shot all of his scenes with a torn ACL. Filming was previously expected to start in the middle of 2025, and then in October. Location shooting in Liverpool, where scenes for The Batman were also shot, was taking place in the city centre. Gotham-themed vehicles were stored at the former Merseyside Police headquarters. Scenes on August 31 were filmed in Derby Square with the Law Courts building standing in for Gotham Hospital, while part of North John Street was made to look like the Gotham Docks, and the Liverpool Central Library doubled for Gotham City Crown Court. Eddie Marsan was revealed to be part of the cast. Additional filming locations in Liverpool included Pier Head and the old Birkenhead Tunnel. Filming also took place in the nearby town of Wallasey, including at the Seacombe Ferry Terminal. On September 11, filming took place on the Marine Promenade outside Adventureland in the suburb of New Brighton. A house on Tollemache Street was dressed as an American home for filming. Soundstage work took place at Warner Bros. Studios Leavesden in England. Filming wrapped on November 1.

=== Post-production ===
Jon Harris, a frequent collaborator of Watkins', edited the film. Visual effects were provided by Framestore, while visual effects were supervised by Angus Bickerton. In January 2026, Gunn said Watkins was finalizing his director's cut and the producers would weigh in on it when it was done. The following month, Warner Bros. pushed back the film's release date to October 23, 2026. It was intended to serve as a Halloween event film similar to Halloween Kills (2021) and Black Phone 2 (2025). At that time, David Dencik was revealed to have a role in Clayface, after previously working with Watkins on McMafia. With the release of the teaser trailer in April 2026, Nancy Carroll, Joshua James, Francesca Corney, Ruby Sear, and Wil Coban were revealed to be appearing in the film. By that July, Watkins stated the film's editing was finished. Leading up to the film's release, Gunn responded to criticism on why DC Studios decided to move forward with Clayface, explaining, "Sometimes someone — in this case initially Mike Flanagan and then James Watkins and Hossein Amini — were inspired by a relatively little known fictional character and crafted what I believe is a very special story around that character. I'd take that inspiration a thousand times over some writer trying to make a buck by writing a listless screenplay about a majorly popular character he or she has no passion or feel for." Safran called horror "one of the most reliable and popular genres with moviegoers", citing the success of fellow horror films Sinners, Obsession (both 2025), and Backrooms (2026). Aaron Paul appears in the film as Jimmy, the abusive father of Matt, and initially filmed extensive flashback scenes. However, the filmmakers ultimately cut most of this footage after shifting the narrative focus away from generational trauma toward a more universal theme of human retribution. As a result, Paul's role was reduced to a fleeting cameo appearance during a climactic club sequence in the final cut.

The special effects studio Legacy Effects developed the conceptual designs and practical effects under the supervision of Shane Mahan. James Watkins favoured practical effects to provide actors with tangible prosthetics during filming. During pre-production, Legacy created clay maquettes as references for designs approved by Watkins and DC Studios co-presidents Gunn and Safran. The prosthetic makeup depicting Matt's facial disfigurement was designed to be forensically realistic, while hidden fabric pull tabs distorted Rhys Harries' face during the transformations. An oversized replica eye was used for the scene in which Matt cuts his own eye with scissors. For the final sequence where Matt was an entirely computer generated creature, Legacy created a practical creature suit as a reference for the digital effects artists.

=== Music ===
Clayface (Original Motion Picture Soundtrack)

Soundtrack album by Volker Bertelmann
- Released: October 16, 2026
- Genre: Horror
- Length: 70:23
- Label: WaterTower Music

By May 2026, Volker Bertelmann had already composed the film's score. The soundtrack was released by WaterTower Music on October 16, 2026.

All music is composed by Volker Bertelmann

Clayface (Original Motion Picture Soundtrack)
No.	Title	Length
1.	"Clayface Theme"	1:55
2.	"If You Leave Me Now – Jasmine Jethwa"	3:30
3.	"Call Back"	4:09
4.	"Just a Message"	2:10
5.	"All Worked Up"	4:56
6.	"Pretty No More"	2:48
7.	"What Do You Have There?"	3:45
8.	"Who Are You?"	2:38
9.	"Mirror"	3:08
10.	"Turbulence"	2:57
11.	"Revenge Inside of You"	3:46
12.	"No Soft Story"	1:16
13.	"Maybe a Smoothie"	4:34
14.	"Your Face Changed"	4:06
15.	"Do You Know?"	2:39
16.	"Not Fair"	2:42
17.	"Rebirth"	1:30
18.	"I Don't Have a Year"	3:42
19.	"No One Up"	1:25
20.	"A Ghost Town"	2:16
21.	"Help Me"	5:11
22.	"Leap of Faith"	1:32
23.	"End Credit (Clayface)"	3:48
Total length:		70:23

== Release ==
Clayface premiered at the Hollywood Legion Theater in Los Angeles on October 13, 2026, and was released theatrically by Warner Bros. Pictures in the United States on October 23. It was originally scheduled for release on September 11, 2026, but was pushed back to the October date in February 2026 to take advantage of the Halloween period. It is part of the DCU's Chapter One: Gods and Monsters.

== Reception ==
=== Box office ===
As of November 21, 2026, Clayface has grossed $65.3 million in the United States and Canada, and $58.9 million in other territories, for a worldwide total of $124.2 million.

Clayface was projected to gross $25–35 million in its opening weekend in the United States and Canada, and $20–25 million internationally, for a worldwide opening of $45–55 million. It earned $24.5 million in its opening weekend in the United States and Canada, with $10.4 million on Friday (including previews), and reached $43 million worldwide. It attracted 73% of viewers aged 18–34, with Hispanic and Latino audiences accounting for 35% of it. In its second weekend, with a 57% drop, the film earned $10.4 million in the United States and Canada, taking its total to $44 million, and reached $83 million worldwide. In its third weekend, Clayface grossed $6.675 million in the United States and Canada, a 39% drop from the previous weekend.

=== Critical response ===
Clayface received generally positive reviews from critics, with praise for Rhys Harries's performance, the body horror, and the use of practical effects, but some criticism for its formulaic script, visual effects, and the depiction of Gotham City. On the review aggregator website Rotten Tomatoes, 78% of 218 critics' reviews are positive, with an average rating of 6.6/10. The website's consensus reads: "Carving out a unique identity for itself in the DCU while closely resembling a litany of body horror classics, Clayface takes time to get going until it eventually morphs into an icky and satisfying revenge thriller." Metacritic, which uses a weighted average, assigned the film a score of 58 out of 100, based on 46 critics, indicating "mixed or average" reviews. Audiences polled by CinemaScore gave the film an average grade of "A−" on an A+ to F scale, while 68% of those surveyed by PostTrak said they would definitely recommend the film.

Frank Scheck of The Hollywood Reporter praised the film as "a big bet that pays off", highlighting Tom Rhys Harries' performance and the portrayal of Matt Hagen's physical and emotional deterioration. Scheck also praised James Watkins for his direction of the body horror sequences and the use of practical effects, and highlighted the psychological depth and emotional resonance of the film. He also compared it to the works of body horror filmmakers David Cronenberg and Sam Raimi. Guy Lodge of Variety praised Clayface as a refreshingly, grotesque body-horror film that exceeds expectations without losing its B-movie spirit, highlighting Watkins' direction, Rhys Harries' anguished performance and the film's grisly practical effects. Hossein Amini's screenplay was commended for its sharp dialogue and sly humour, while Naomi Ackie's performance and the imaginative casting added depth to the characters. Glenn Garner for Deadline Hollywood praised the graphic body horror and jump scares, and the chemistry between Rhys Harries and Ackie, which adds a dark romantic element to the film. Garner also praised its exploration of Hollywood's obsession with beauty, police corruption and medical companies prioritising cosmetic procedures over life-saving research, without becoming preachy.

Amy Nicholson from the Los Angeles Times praised the inventive body-horror sequences but criticised its slow pacing, lack of originality and weak characterisation. Nicholson also faulted the screenplay for failing to develop Matt's moral complexity and the romance between Rhys Harries and Ackie, arguing that the film lacks emotional impact. Brian Tallarico from RogerEbert.com gave the film a one-and-a-half-star-out-of-four review. While noting that the film "ultimately gets to a few memorable set pieces," Tallarico felt that Rhys Harries and Watkins lacked a clear vision for approaching Matt's journey, criticized the performance as inconsistent, and considered the film's vision of Gotham City dull.
