= Qaleh Mansur =

Qaleh Mansur (Persian: قلعه منصور) may refer to:

- Masur, Iran
- Qaleh-ye Mansur
