= Amanda Waller (DC Extended Universe) =

- DC Extended Universe and DC Universe character
- Viola Davis as Amanda Waller in Suicide Squad (2016)
- First appearance: DC Extended Universe: Suicide Squad (2016); DC Universe: "The Collywobbles"; Creature Commandos season 1 (2024)
- Last appearance: DC Extended Universe: Black Adam (2022)
- Based on: Amanda Waller by: John Ostrander; Len Wein; John Byrne
- Adapted by: David Ayer (DCEU); James Gunn (DCU)
- Portrayed by: Viola Davis

In-universe information
- Full name: Amanda Belle Waller (née Blake)
- Occupation: Government official; Director of A.R.G.U.S.; Leader of the Suicide Squad and the Creature Commandos
- Affiliation: A.R.G.U.S.; Suicide Squad; 11th Street Kids; Creature Commandos
- Family: Leota Adebayo (daughter)

Amanda Belle Waller (née Blake) is a fictional character in the DC Extended Universe (DCEU) and later the DC Universe (DCU) media franchise. She is portrayed by Viola Davis and is based on the DC Comics character of the same name. A morally ambiguous "ends justify the means" character as portrayed in the comics, Waller is a ruthless, calculating government official and the director of the agency A.R.G.U.S.

In the DCEU, Waller initially oversees the operations of the black ops unit "Task Force X", selecting an ensemble of incarcerated inmates at the Belle Reve Correctional Facility to partake in covert operations that were to be performed discreetly, to preserve government interests and avoid interference from other active metahumans. She notably supervised the original incarnation of Task Force X that was dispatched to stop the Enchantress from taking over Earth alongside her brother, as well as a second iteration of the team that infiltrated the remote island of Corto Maltese in order to destroy the fortified base Jotunheim and neutralize an extraterrestrial being known as "Starro".

In the DCU, she sent out a group of A.R.G.U.S. agents alongside former Task Force X member Christopher Smith / Peacemaker and her estranged daughter Leota Adebayo, to destroy an alien species known as Butterflies to prevent a global invasion. Following its completion, Adebayo leaked the existence of Task Force X and Waller's involvement, leading the U.S. Congress to bar her from exploiting any human subjects. Waller instead forms "Task Force M", a conceptually similar strike team now composed of monsters and metahumans, who are sent out to Pokolistan in order to stop an ongoing invasion effort by the Amazonian sorcereress Circe and the Sons of Themyscira, while protecting its Princess Illana Rostovic. A vision of a potential future from Circe leads Waller to direct them back to the country in order to kill Rostovic before she is poised to wage war against Earth and kill all metahumans.

As of 2023, the character was a major recurring figure in the DCEU, appearing in the films Suicide Squad (2016), its standalone sequel The Suicide Squad (2021), and Black Adam (2022) with an uncredited cameo, as well as the first season of the television series Peacemaker (2022–present). The character is integrated into the rebooted continuity of the DC Universe (DCU) media franchise, returning in both the animated series Creature Commandos (2024–present), and is to be featured in the live-action series Waller as the main protagonist.

== Character development ==
=== Comics origins and prior portrayals ===
In the comics, Amanda Waller first appeared in the 1980s as a Congressional aide who is placed in charge of the Suicide Squad, with her role and characteristics varying with publication changes such as The New 52. Waller has often been featured in other media based on DC Comics, with voice actresses CCH Pounder, Sheryl Lee Ralph, and Tisha Campbell voicing the character in cartoons and animated films such as Justice League Unlimited, Young Justice, the DC Animated Movie Universe, and Harley Quinn, as well as being portrayed in live action by Pam Grier in Smallville, Cynthia Addai-Robinson in the Arrowverse, and Angela Bassett in the film Green Lantern.

=== Casting in the DCEU ===
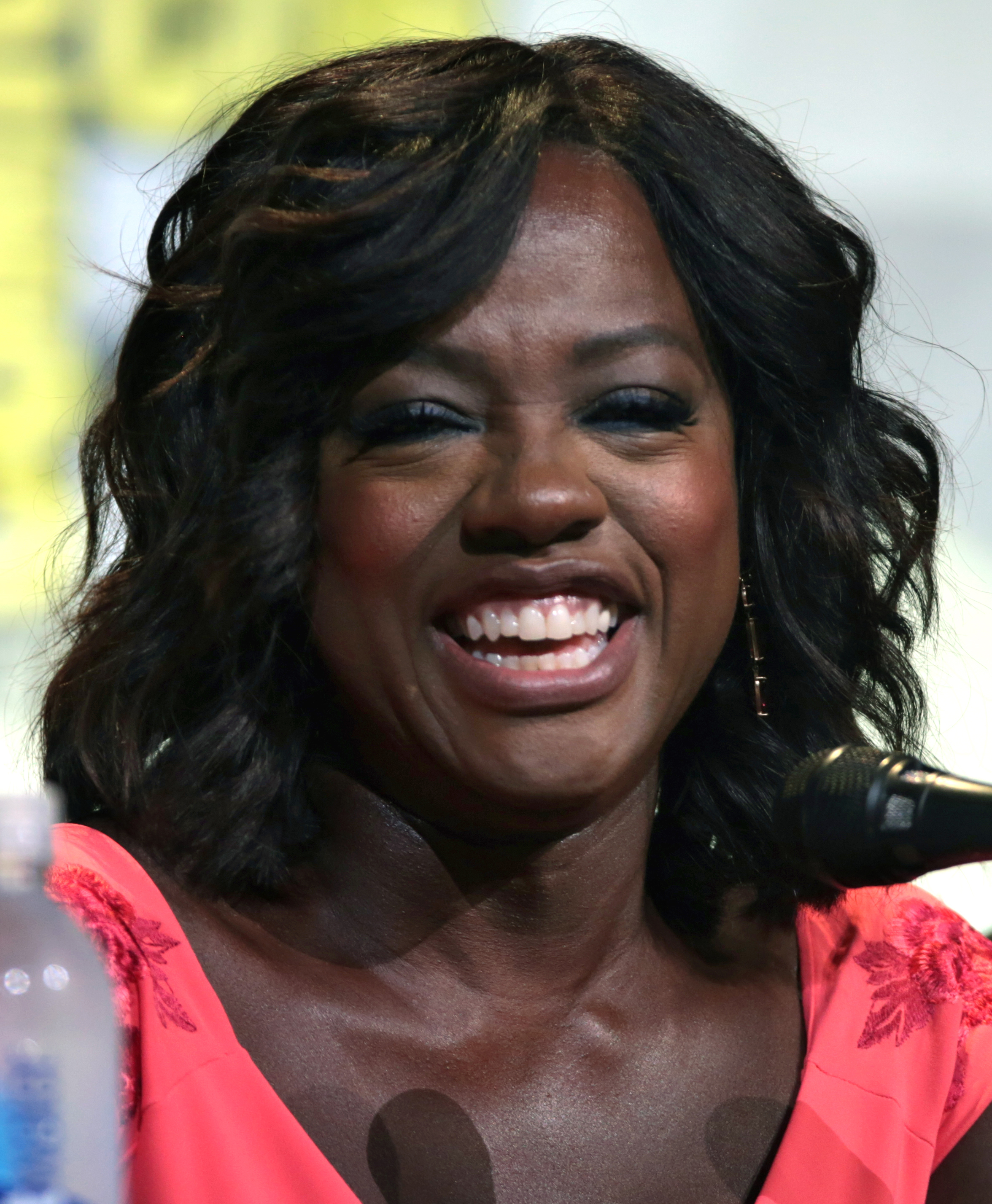
Upon being cast as Waller, Viola Davis praised her character's strength and ability to manipulate superheroes and supervillains on a whim.

Actress Viola Davis was cast to play Waller in Suicide Squad, which is set in the DC Extended Universe. Davis stated of her character: "She's a strategist. She's a manipulator. She doesn't fly in the sky or swim in the water. She's just a regular person who can manipulate these superheroes. And I love that." She also singled out her psychology and strength and described her as a "powerful black woman, hard, ready to pick up a gun and shoot anyone at will," in addition to "relentless in her villainy" and noted that her powers are "her intelligence and her complete lack of guilt."

Davis read Confessions of a Sociopath in order to prepare for the role. She stated that her experience working on the film was unique for her, as director David Ayer and other cast members utilized unorthodox acting techniques during filming. In one instance, Ayer made her call Rick Flag actor Joel Kinnaman a "pussy" and "bitch", which as she described, made her "feel like a straight up thug, and it made Rick Flag want to kick my ass. So David got what he wanted." Kinnaman later confirmed he felt "betrayed" by Davis' words, but that it was what Ayer wanted his character to feel at that moment. In a later interview, she said that during the early stages of filming, Joker actor Jared Leto had a "henchman" leave a dead pig on a table in the rehearsal room, unsettling Davis until she "snapped out of it" and used the incident to motivate her own performance, and that Leto had also given Margot Robbie, who portrayed Harley Quinn, a live black rat in a box. Davis commented that Robbie "screamed, and then she kept it."

Davis reprised the role in The Suicide Squad, Peacemaker, and Black Adam. She has also entered talks to star in an HBO Max series centered on her character.

== Fictional character biography ==
=== DC Extended Universe ===
==== Creating Task Force X ====
Amanda Waller is introduced in Suicide Squad as an FBI official in charge of A.R.G.U.S.. She is shown to be in contact with vigilantes such as Bruce Wayne / Batman, to whom she provides intelligence in order for him to apprehend criminals such as Floyd Lawton / Deadshot. Following the death of Superman, (Note: As depicted in Batman v Superman: Dawn of Justice (2016)) Waller, concerned that the "next Superman" may not "share his moral code," creates Task Force X, later known as the "Suicide Squad", by enlisting incarcerated metahumans and other extraordinary criminals such as Deadshot, Harley Quinn, Captain Boomerang, El Diablo, and Killer Croc. She also attempts to enlist June Moon / Enchantress and Slipknot, but Enchantress goes rogue and creates a global threat while Slipknot is executed for desertion by squad leader Rick Flag during the squad's mission to contain Enchantress. The squad is forced to rescue Waller, much to their chagrin, as she is attempting to cover up her role in Enchantress' escape.

After the team neutralizes Enchantress, freeing Moon from her possession, Waller rewards most of its members except Captain Boomerang with 10 years reduced from their sentences and various gifts. She later meets in-person with Bruce Wayne, giving him classified government documents on several metahumans including Arthur Curry and Barry Allen so he can recruit them for his own team, (Note: As depicted in Justice League (2017) and its 2021 director's cut) in exchange for Wayne protecting her reputation and concealing her involvement with Task Force X.

==== Destroying Project Starfish ====
Years later, Waller deploys two new Task Force X groups, each squad initially unaware of the existence of the other, in Corto Maltese following an anti-American coup to disrupt the country's "Project Starfish", revealed to be also a mission to conceal America's role in the inhumane experiments while besides destroying the said project before being weaponized by the new regime. The first squad, led by Rick Flag and also including Harley Quinn, Captain Boomerang, and several others, attacks via amphibious warfare and save for Flag, Quinn, and teammates Cory Pitzner / T.D.K. and "John Doe" / Weasel, is annihilated by Corto Maltesean defenses, with Flag being rescued by the local rebellion group, the Freedom Fighters, Quinn being captured by the military and T.D.K. and Weasel being left for dead but still had survived. Waller personally executes a terrifying teammate Brian Durlin / Savant for desertion by remotely detonating an explosive planted in his head. The second squad, consisting of Robert DuBois / Bloodsport, whom Waller personally blackmails into joining and leading the second team by threatening to incarcerate his daughter Tyla into Belle Reve, Chris Smith / Peacemaker, Nanaue / King Shark, Cleo Cazo / Ratcatcher 2 and her pet rat Sebastian, and Abner Krill / Polka-Dot Man, infiltrates while the Corto Maltesean military is distracted by the first squad, which was merely a deliberate decoy.

The second squad rescues Flag and Quinn before converging on the location of Project Starfish at Jötunheim, a Nazi-era research facility. Both revealed by their captive, the project's head geneticist, Thinker, who was forced by the team to help them infiltrated Jötenheim, that he had been hired by both the United States and Corto Maltesean governments to oversee the project and Waller's real attention to assembled this squad. Waller has also specifically planted Peacemaker to ensure no one leaked the project. The ensuing scuffle results in Peacemaker remorsefully killing Flag and almost killing Cazo before Bloodsport subdues him, in addition to Starro, the giant, starfish-like alien at the center of "Project Starfish", breaking out, kills Thinker for the experiments on it, wreaking havoc on the island, killing its inhabitants and taking control of their corpses. Waller orders the remaining squad members to evacuate, seeing that Starro's escape their secrecy and that it would help bring down a hostile country, but they defy her orders, out of concern for Corto Maltese's citizens. Enraged for risking their secrecy, Waller threatens to execute them all before her subordinate Flo Crawley knocks her out and, along with the tactical support team, including Emilia Harcourt and John Economos, give the squad the go-ahead to save Corto Maltese from Starro. After they kill the giant alien, Bloodsport is able to negotiate with a recovering Waller to let him and his remaining squad teammates Quinn, Nanaue, Cazo and Sebastian go free and airlifted them off the island along to still drop his daughter's incarcerate, using the evidence he took of the American involvement in Project Starfish as a bargaining chip.

==== Project Butterfly ====
Several months after Project Starfish, Waller commissions a new team to contain an extraterrestrial threat, an alien race called the Butterflies, with Clemson Murn assigned to lead and Peacemaker assigned after his recovery, unknown to her that Murn is killed and controlled by a rogue Butterfly named Ik Nobe Lok. As punishment for their insubordination during Project Starfish, Economos and Harcourt are also assigned by Waller, much to their chagrin as they feel as if they are being forced to "babysit" Smith. Waller's daughter Leota Adebayo, also assigned to the team, is conflicted between following her mother's orders to incriminate Smith and her bond with him. Leota, becoming disillusioned with her mother, later leaks Waller's involvement with both Project Butterfly and Task Force X, clearing Smith's name and putting a shocked Waller in a predicament in the process.

==== Release of Teth-Adam ====
After Teth-Adam is awakened from a 5,000-year slumber in Kahndaq, Waller contacts Carter Hall / Hawkman and the Justice Society, dispatching them to contain Adam and prevent him from potentially unleashing another rampage for which he was imprisoned by the Council of Wizards. After coming to terms with Adam and facing off against Intergang, the Justice Society take in Adam, who surrenders out of remorse and feeling unfit to be a hero. However, Adam is broken out of his containment by Kent Nelson / Doctor Fate and helps save the country from Sabbac. Waller contacts Adam, who has now adapted the more modern name Black Adam, warning him not to leave Khandaq and sending a since-resurrected Superman to have a word with him.

=== DC Universe ===
==== Forming the Creature Commandos ====
In the new continuity of the DC Universe, this iteration of Waller heads the Advanced Research Group of the United States, which monitors and potentially intervenes with metahuman, paranormal and occult activities. After Leota Adebayo exposed her involvement with Task Force X, an injunction was made to prevent Waller from exploiting the human population of Belle Reve by the U.S. congress. Since then, to protect the allied nation of Pokolistan and its heiress, Princess Ilana Rostovic, from the attacks of the rogue Amazonian sorceress Circe and her followers, the Sons of Themyscira, she assembles and sends a black ops team of non-human Belle Reve inmates, from their Non-Human Interment Division, called Task Force M, also known as the Creature Commandos. The team is led by Gen. Rick Flag Sr. and consists of Nina Mazursky, Alex Sartorius / Dr. Phosphorus, the Bride, G.I. Robot, and a returned, reconvicted Weasel.

After the team manages to apprehend Circe, who destroyed G.I., Waller, Flag, and Economos meet her in the interrogation room at Belle Reve, where Circe tries to prove her claim that they were dooming the world, by showing Waller visions of an apocalyptic future. In it, Waller sees Rostovic become a ruthless warlord who works with Gorilla Grodd to conquer other nations and murder numerous superheroes. She later verifies the vision with Themyscyran expert Alisa MacPherson, who confirms Circe's clairvoyant powers as legitimate. She then orders Flag to return with the Commandos to Pokolistan and assassinate Rostovic, but Flag refuses, believing that the vision may have been falsified. After dismissing Flag, Waller assigns the Bride as the new leader of the Commandos.

Later, Waller learns that Flag has been hospitalized after suffering serious injuries, and that Eric Frankenstein helped to get him there. Some time after, Flag regains consciousness, and tells Waller that the assassination mission is a set-up, prompting her and Economos to investigate MacPherson's home. They learn that the real MacPherson has been killed and impersonated by Clayface, who attacked Flag and Frankenstein, leading them to believe that Circe tricked them into potentially starting a war. Waller contacts Rostovic's Amethyst Knights and manages to stop them from apprehending the Commandos, though she was too late to prevent Nina's death at Rostovic's hands. Unbeknownst to Waller, Rostovic was working with Clayface to trick both her and Flag, but, after seeing a video footage of the princess and Clayface, the Bride, who became fond of Nina, deduces Rostovic's deception and kills her before leaving the country with the rest of her team.

Some time later, Waller assigns the Bride, as well as the Commandos, along with G.I. who have been rebuilt with a giant body, with a new living space within Belle Reve, while also appoints three new members to the team: Nosferata, Khalis, and a reconvicted King Shark.

==== Stepping down from A.R.G.U.S. ====
Following Task Force M's successful operation in Pokolistan and amidst continued congressional scrutiny regarding Task Force X's creation, Waller left her responsibilities as director of A.R.G.U.S. and was immediately succeeded by Rick Flag Sr. at the request of the President of the United States. Flag Sr. immediately demanded access to confidential documentation pertaining to the death of his son Rick Flag Jr. during "Project Starfish" in Corto Maltese, and learned about Waller's orders to Chris Smith / Peacemaker to assassinate Flag for threatening to expose the country's collusion.

== Reception ==
Mark Birrel of Screen Rant ranked Amanda Waller in Suicide Squad the best villain in any DCEU film, looking at the films up to 2019. He writes "Viola Davis' turn as the fan-favorite character produced the DCEU's most human, and most cunning, villain in what has been their most critically reviled effort yet. Davis manages to outshine some of the biggest, brightest, loudest stars in an almighty ensemble movie that's chock-full of conflicting motivations and personalities." He also notes that her unwavering confidence and ruthlessness makes her the perfect "don" of the Suicide Squad. Darren Mooney writes in a review of the film's standalone sequel/soft reboot The Suicide Squad that Waller's character and "spymaster archetype" had been deconstructed in the film, due to factors such as having a less dominating presence in the sequel in favor of the second Suicide Squad's members and being more mistake-prone, making errors such as erroneously sending Weasel on an amphibious assault when he is unable to swim and being out-maneuvered by Bloodsport in the film's climax. Mooney also describes Waller as the DCEU's counterpart to Nick Fury of the Marvel Cinematic Universe (MCU), continuing to say that like Fury, Waller is "another seemingly mortal character manipulating the superheroes around her within a military framework."

After the release of the film The Woman King, which starred Viola Davis, Renaldo Matadeen of CBR.com wrote in 2022 that the DCEU was "wasting" her portrayal of Amanda Waller, given Davis' strong performance in the film. Matadeen argued that the DCEU should have portrayed more angles of Waller's character instead of having her "being put in a box in the Suicide Squad and Peacemaker properties, where she barks orders from the Task Force X headquarters", also calling her nothing more than a "corporate shill for the government" aside from when she met Bruce Wayne and came off as "quite scary" in Suicide Squad.

== See also ==
- Characters of the DC Extended Universe
