= DC Showcase: Sgt. Rock =

2019 animated superhero short film

- Directed by: Bruce Timm
- Written by: Louise Simonson; Walter Simonson; Tim Sheridan
- Based on: Sgt. Rock by; Robert Kanigher; Joe Kubert; Lt. Matthew Shrieve and The Creature Commandos by; J.M. DeMatteis; Pat Broderick
- Produced by: Amy McKenna
- Starring: Karl Urban; Keith Ferguson; William Salyers; Audrey Wasilewski
- Edited by: Christopher D. Lozinski
- Music by: Lolita Ritmanis; Michael McCuistion; Kristopher Carter
- Production companies: Warner Bros. Animation; DC Entertainment
- Distributed by: Warner Bros. Home Entertainment
- Release date: August 6, 2019
- Running time: 14 minutes
- Country: United States
- Language: English

DC Showcase: Sgt. Rock is a 2019 American animated short war superhero film based on the titular character, directed by Bruce Timm, written by Louise Simonson, Walter Simonson and Tim Sheridan, and produced by Warner Bros. Animation and DC Entertainment. The short was included as part of the home media release of Batman: Hush (2019).

It is the first DC Showcase installment in eight years since DC Showcase: Catwoman.

== Plot ==
Waking up in a field hospital months after his squad, Easy Company, was killed in a fierce battle and recovering from his injuries, Sgt. Rock is tasked by Lt. Matthew Shrieve to capture a female German Nazi scientist with the aid of the top secret Creature Commandos, consisting of Pvt. Warren Griffith, a wolfman hybrid; Sgt. Vincent Velcro, a vampire; and Pvt. Elliot Taylor, a Frankenstein-like monster. They quietly enter the castle and find the scientist and her assistant but are ambushed by Rock's archenemy, the Iron Major. The scientist activates a switch to a generator powering a "rumored doomsday weapon". Taylor destroys the generator, and Velcro stopped the assistant from opening the steel doors of a chamber, but the doors burst open, releasing Rock's squad, the Easy Company, who were revived as undead soldiers. The Creature Commandos manage to kill five of the zombies but discover that the generator was meant to revive Rock's friend Bulldozer. Bulldozer was a physically equal match to Taylor and both Velcoro and Griffith could not stop him either. Sgt. Rock manages to get a hold of his Thompson submachine gun and kills Bulldozer with it. As the laboratory catches on fire, Iron Major and the scientists attempt to flee but Rock and the Commandos corner them. The Major gloats saying Rock will not shoot them because he has orders to take them alive so that the Americans can force them to build their own "army of the dead". Realizing this, Rock orders the Commandos to kill the Iron Major and the scientists and burn down the castle along with their research. Once outside, Rock orders the Commandos to fall in as he is about to make a statement. He says that Lt. Shrieve has been taking them for granted and for withholding information in the mission briefing, Rock has guaranteed he will do everything in his power so that never again will the Creature Commandos be deployed in battle in this manner and they will keep quiet about what had happened in the castle. As they move out, Rock takes one last look at the burning castle knowing he has given Easy Company a proper cremation before he departs.

== Cast ==
- Karl Urban as Sgt. Rock
- Keith Ferguson as Lt. Matthew Shrieve
- William Salyers as The Iron Major
- Audrey Wasilewski as Nurse
