= Mazur (surname) =

Mazur (archaic feminine: Mazurowa, plural Mazurowie) is the 14th most common surname in Poland (68,090 people in 2009). It signifies someone from northern Mazovia and has been known since the 15th century.

Notable people with the surname include:

- Adam Mazur (born 2001), American baseball player
- Aleksandr Mazur (1913–2005), Ukrainian wrestler
- Alexander J. Mazur (1969–2016), American scholar
- Alexandra Mazur (born 1986), Russian beauty pageant contestant
- Alla Mazur (born 1965), Ukrainian journalist
- Amy Mazur (born 1962), American political scientist
- Barry Mazur (born 1937), American mathematician
- Carter Mazur (born 2002), American ice hockey player
- D. Bennett Mazur (1924–1994), American politician
- Daniel Mazur (born 1960), American mountain climber
- Eddie Mazur (1929–1995), Canadian ice hockey player
- Edward Mazur (1946–2023), Polish-American businessman
- Eliyahu Mazur (1889–1973), Israeli politician
- Elżbieta Trela-Mazur (born 1947), Polish historian
- Epic Mazur (born 1970), American musician
- Eric Mazur (born 1954), American physicist
- Federico Mazur (born 1993), Argentine footballer
- Grace Dane Mazur (born 1944), American writer
- Gyula Mazur (1888–1953), Hungarian cyclist
- Henry Mazur (1919–1988), American military officer and football player
- Henryk Mazur (born 1953), Polish wrestler
- Jan Mazur (1920–2008), Polish Roman Catholic bishop
- Jay Mazur (born 1965), Canadian-American ice hockey player
- Jay Mazur (labor union president) (1932–2025), American labor leader
- Jerzy Mazur (born 1953), Polish Roman Catholic bishop
- Joanna Mazur (born 1990), Polish Paralympic athlete
- John Mazur (1930–2013), American football player and coach
- John Mazur (ice hockey) (born 1954), Canadian ice hockey player
- Joseph Mazur (born 1942), American mathematician
- Jozef Mazur (1897–1970), Polish-American artist
- Heather Mazur (born 1976), American actress
- Kazimierz Mazur (1930–2000), Polish modern pentathlete
- Lara Mazur, Canadian film and television editor
- Lucas Mazur (born 1997), French para badminton player
- Magdalena Mazur (born 1976), Polish television presenter
- Marian Mazur (1909–1983), Polish cyberneticist
- Marilyn Mazur (1955–2025), American-born Danish percussionist
- Mark Mazur, American economist
- Mary Mazur, American producer
- Meron Mazur (born 1962), Brazilian Ukrainian Greek Catholic hierarch
- Michael Mazur (1935–2009), American artist
- Miriam Mazur (1909–2000), American mathematician
- Mirek Mazur (born 1961), Polish-Canadian cycling coach
- Monet Mazur (born 1976), American actress and musician
- Myroslav Mazur (born 1998), Ukrainian footballer
- Peter Mazur (1922–2001), Dutch theoretical physicist
- Piotr Mazur (born 1982), Polish-Canadian road bicycle racer
- Piotr Mazur (canoeist) (born 1991), Polish sprint canoeist
- Przemysław Mazur (born 1978), Polish rally codriver
- Richard Masur (born 1948), American actor
- Rodrigo Mazur (born 1992), Argentine footballer
- Ruby Mazur, American artist
- Sara Mazur (born 1966), Swedish physicist
- Serhiy Mazur (born 1970), Ukrainian footballer
- Stanisław Mazur (1905–1981), Polish mathematician
- Steve Mazur (born 1977), American guitarist
- Vasyl Mazur (born 1970), Ukrainian footballer
- Viktoria Mazur (born 1994), Ukrainian rhythmic gymnast
- Vladimir Mazur (born 1966), Russian politician
- Vladyslav Mazur (born 1996), Ukrainian athlete
- Włodzimierz Mazur (1954–1988), Polish footballer

== See also ==
- Mazur (disambiguation)
- Mazurka
- Masur (surname)
