= Creature Commandos (TV series) =

DC Studios animated series

- Genre: Superhero
- Created by: James Gunn
- Based on: Characters from DC
- Showrunner: Dean Lorey
- Written by: James Gunn
- Starring: Indira Varma; Sean Gunn; Alan Tudyk; Zoë Chao; David Harbour; Frank Grillo
- Music by: Kevin Kiner; Clint Mansell
- Opening theme: "Moliendo Café" by Fanfare Ciocǎrlia
- Ending theme: "Juodaan Viinaa" by Korpiklaani (episode 1); "Ompa til du dør" by Kaizers Orchestra (episode 2); "The Feeling You Bring" by Mount Righteous (episode 3)
- Country of origin: United States
- Original language: English
- No. of seasons: 1
- No. of episodes: 7

Production
- Executive producers: James Gunn; Peter Safran; Sam Register; Dean Lorey
- Producer: Kandace Reuter
- Editors: Annie De Brock; Craig Paulsen
- Running time: 22–28 minutes
- Production companies: Troll Court Entertainment; The Safran Company; Lorey Stories; DC Studios; Warner Bros. Animation

Original release
- Network: HBO Max
- Release: December 5, 2024 – present

Related
- DC Universe television series

Creature Commandos is an American adult animated superhero television series created by James Gunn for the streaming service HBO Max. Based on the eponymous team from DC Comics, it is produced by DC Studios and Warner Bros. Animation as the first television series and the first installment in the DC Universe (DCU). The series focuses on a black ops team of monsters assembled by Amanda Waller. All seven episodes of the first season were written by Gunn, with Dean Lorey serving as showrunner and Yves "Balak" Bigerel as supervising director.

The series features an ensemble cast including Indira Varma, Sean Gunn, Alan Tudyk, Zoë Chao, David Harbour, and Frank Grillo. After James Gunn and Peter Safran became co-CEOs of DC Studios in October 2022, they announced Creature Commandos in January 2023. Production on the series had begun by then and casting was underway. The cast was announced that April. Bobbypills and Studio IAM provided animation for the series.

Creature Commandos premiered on the streaming service HBO Max on December 5, 2024, with its first two episodes. The series received positive reviews from critics, who praised the voice acting, Gunn's writing, and emotional weight. It is the first entry in the DCU's Chapter One: Gods and Monsters. In December 2024, the series was renewed for a second season.

== Premise ==
After the events of the first season of Peacemaker (2022), Amanda Waller assembles a black ops team of monsters led by General Rick Flag Sr.

== Cast and characters ==
=== Main ===
- Indira Varma as the Bride:
  A member turned leader of Task Force M and a homunculus created from various female corpses' body parts to serve as a companion to Eric Frankenstein. Creator James Gunn felt Varma's performance adds a "whole other dimension" to the character, being incredible alongside Eric.
- Sean Gunn as
  - G.I. Robot: A member of Task Force M and the World War II infantry unit Easy Company and a military android whose purpose is to kill Nazis. James Gunn said there was a "sweet, mechanic innocence" to the character that he did not see until Sean's performance. Early designs for the character were similar to a trash can and robots from the 1950s science fiction before the "friendlier, wide-eyed" final design was settled on.
  - "John Doe" / Weasel: An anthropomorphic, rodent-like member of Task Force M and the Suicide Squad, who was compared to the Tasmanian Devil from Looney Tunes. Gunn said Weasel's backstory would be explored in the series, which showrunner Dean Lorey described as "heartbreaking, touching and emotional" in ways that would surprise the audience.
- Alan Tudyk as
  - Alex Sartorius / Doctor Phosphorus: A member of Task Force M and a scientist turned crime lord who is a metahuman with radioactive powers. The Kirby Krackle effect was incorporated into the character's flaming skin.
  - Will Magnus: A scientist specializing in robotics who studied G.I. Robot during the 1960s. Tudyk based his performance on director Mike Nichols.
  - Matt Hagen / Clayface: A shapeshifting criminal whose body is made of clay. Tudyk reprises his role from the Harley Quinn (2019–present) animated series, where he voiced a different version of the character. In July 2026, producer Peter Safran confirmed the character was the Matt Hagen version, who would be seen portrayed by Tom Rhys Harries in the live-action DC Universe (DCU) film Clayface (2026), with that film set before the events of Creature Commandos.
- Zoë Chao as Nina Mazursky (season 1): A member of Task Force M and a mutant with aquatic features who is only able to breathe underwater and is forced to wear a containment suit on land.
- David Harbour as Eric Frankenstein:
  A homunculus and the Bride's "very colorful" intended love interest turned stalker who killed their creator and the Bride's lover Victor in a jealous rage centuries earlier. By taking more inspiration from Mary Shelley's novel Frankenstein (1818) instead of his "lumbering and grunting" portrayal in adaptations such as the 1931 film, Gunn found Eric to be well-spoken and intellectual while still being driven by his rage, anger, inability to be truly human and not being loved by the one he loves.
- Frank Grillo as Rick Flag Sr.:
  A United States Army General and the first leader of Task Force M. Grillo describes Flag Sr. as having more gravitas and competence than his son, Suicide Squad leader Rick Flag Jr., who was killed in the DC Extended Universe (DCEU) film The Suicide Squad (2021).
- Sydney Chandler as Nosferata (season 2):
  A vampire created by the 1940s experiments of Project Moreau who is selected to join the second iteration of Task Force M. The character originally made non-speaking appearances in season 1.

=== Recurring ===
- Maria Bakalova as:
  - Princess Ilana Rostovic:
    The heiress to the throne of Pokolistan. Bakalova was the first person cast in the DCU, with Gunn developing Ilana with her and her knowledge of Bulgarian in mind.
  - An unnamed old woman who watches over Frankenstein's Castle at Eric's request.
- Anya Chalotra as Circe: A rogue Amazonian sorceress who seeks to become ruler of her homeland Themyscira.
- Viola Davis as Amanda Waller: The director of A.R.G.U.S. who assembles Task Force M.
- Julian Kostov as
  - Alexi: The Amethyst Knight Captain who serves Ilana until he is killed by Doctor Phosphorus.
  - Sergei: The second Amethyst Knight Captain, who replaces Alexi following his death.
- Steve Agee as John Economos: An A.R.G.U.S. agent and aide to Waller who is currently recuperating from an injury.
- Stephanie Beatriz as Aisla MacPherson: A professor who specializes in studying Themyscira.

=== Guest ===
- Peter Serafinowicz as Victor Frankenstein: A 19th-century scientist, the creator of Eric and the Bride, and the latter's lover who was killed by Eric out of jealousy.
- Michael Rooker as Sam Fitzgibbon: A military antique collector and member of a neo-Nazi group who, despite their friendship, was killed by G.I. in the 1990s.
- Maury Sterling as Sgt. Frank Rock: The leader of the Easy Company.
- Paul Ben-Victor as Bulldozer: A member of the Easy Company.
- Robbie Daymond as Little Sure Shot: A member of the Easy Company.
- Linda Cardellini as Elizabeth Bates: Weasel's lawyer.
- Jason Konopisos as Congorilla: A talking, yellow-furred gorilla and a Belle Reve inmate who is killed by the Bride for bullying Nina.
- Shohreh Aghdashloo as Madam Gyurov: The madam of the Can-Can Brothel in Pokolistan that the Bride and Nina hide out with.
- Benjamin Byron Davis as Rupert Thorne: A Gotham City mob boss who is responsible for Doctor Phosphorus' transformation.
- Parisa Fakhri as Parvin Sartorius: Doctor Phosphorus' late wife who was killed by Rupert Thorne's men.
- Luke Cook as Paddy Craic: An electrokinetic metahuman in Pokolistan who encounters the Bride at the Can-Can Brothel.
- Russ Bain as Brian Craic: An electrokinetic metahuman in Pokolistan and brother of Paddy Craic who encounters the Bride at the Can-Can Brothel.
- Gregg Henry as Edward Mazursky: A scientist from Star City and Nina's late father.
- Joy Osmanski as Lily Mazursky: Nina's mother and Edward's wife.
- Diedrich Bader as Nanaue / King Shark:
  A shark-human hybrid, Belle Reve inmate, and member of the Suicide Squad and the second iteration of Task Force M. The character was previously voiced by Sylvester Stallone in The Suicide Squad.

Additionally, several DC Comics characters make non-speaking cameo appearances in the series, including:

- Superheroes Superman, Batman, Wonder Woman, Hawkgirl, Peacemaker, Vigilante, Blue Beetle, Booster Gold, Starfire, Mister Terrific, Green Lantern, Supergirl, Robin, Kid Flash, and Judomaster as well as the supervillain Gorilla Grodd are seen in Circe's flashforward, with Batman also appearing in Doctor Phosphorus' flashback.
- Easy Company members Wildman, Four Eyes, and Canary are seen in G.I. Robot's flashback. Animal-Vegetable-Mineral Man, Crimson Centipede, Shaggy Man, and Fisherman appear as inmates of Belle Reve.
- Khalis, Egg Fu, Bug-Eyed Bandit, Chemo, and Orca appear as inmates of Belle Reve's Non-Human Interment Division.

== Episodes ==
=== Season 1 (2024–25) ===
No.	Title	Directed by	Written by	Original release date
1	"The Collywobbles"	Matt Peters	James Gunn	December 5, 2024
The nation of Pokolistan is under attack by the Amazonian sorceress Circe and her followers, the Sons of Themyscira. As the United States is interested in Pokolistan's petroleum, A.R.G.U.S. director Amanda Waller tasks General Rick Flag Sr. with entering Pokolistan to help their heiress and de facto ruler, Princess Ilana Rostovic, stop Circe. Due to Congress shutting down Waller's Task Force X program (Note: As depicted in the Peacemaker episode "It's Cow or Never" (2022)) for putting human lives in jeopardy two years prior, (Note: As depicted in The Suicide Squad (2021)) she recruits a team of non-human inmates from Belle Reve Penitentiary; the Bride, Doctor Phosphorus, G.I. Robot, Weasel, and Nina Mazursky; and codenames them "Task Force M". After meeting Ilana, Flag and the team settle in her castle. Ilana makes sexual advances towards Flag, which he brushes aside. Later that night, Phosphorus sneaks into Flag's room to steal his remote detonator, which allows Flag to electrically shock the others should they disobey orders. Flag discovers this and defeats Phosphorus in a fight. Meanwhile, the Bride, followed by a reluctant Nina, sneaks out of the castle to visit the Bride's birthplace, an abandoned mansion in Pokolistan. An old woman living nearby notifies Eric Frankenstein of the Bride's appearance.
2	"The Tourmaline Necklace"	Sam Liu	James Gunn	December 5, 2024
In 1831, Eric requests that his creator, Dr. Victor Frankenstein, create a bride for him from female cadavers. After successfully doing so, Victor teaches the Bride how to speak and function normally, to Eric's dismay. Despite Eric's advances, the Bride remains fearful of him, causing him to run away. Sometime later, Victor presents the Bride with a tourmaline necklace. The two of them fall in love and have sex, which Eric witnesses. Eric subsequently murders Victor, causing the Bride to attack him. In the ensuing fight, Victor's mansion burns down and the Bride runs away. In the intervening centuries, Eric chases the Bride across the world despite her rejecting him in every encounter. In the present, Ilana tends to Flag's wounds, then seduces him once more, leading to them having sex. Meanwhile, the Bride and Nina successfully search Victor's mansion for the necklace. They are attacked by Circe, who was alerted to their presence by the Sons. Circe fights and defeats the Bride. Nina contacts Flag for assistance, but one of the Sons shoots her helmet, breaking it and rendering her unable to breathe. The Sons then capture Nina and the Bride.
3	"Cheers to the Tin Man"	Matt Peters	James Gunn	December 12, 2024
In flashbacks, G.I. Robot joins the Easy Company in fighting during World War II. In the 1960s, the United States government hands the decommissioned G.I. off to scientist Will Magnus for study. In the 2000s, G.I. is found in an antiques shop by collector Sam Fitzgibbon, who accepts the former into his home. Eventually, G.I. learns that Sam is part of a neo-Nazi group and carries out his directive: to kill all Nazis and their allies. After killing Sam, among other neo-Nazis, G.I. is arrested and sentenced to imprisonment in Belle Reve. In the present, Task Force M arrives at Victor's mansion to find that Nina and the Bride were left alive. Flag realizes that Circe and the Sons have already left to attack Ilana's castle. The team returns to find the castle under siege. Ilana kills two Sons to avoid capture. Flag tells G.I. that the Sons are Nazis, so G.I. responds by shooting and killing the Sons. Circe destroys G.I. and nearly kills Ilana before being stopped by Weasel and Phosphorus. A defeated Circe exclaims that Task Force M has doomed the world by stopping her.
4	"Chasing Squirrels"	Sam Liu	James Gunn	December 19, 2024
In flashbacks, Weasel befriends and plays with eight schoolchildren. An old man mistakes Weasel as a threat and calls the police. The old man shoots at Weasel, inadvertently causing an explosion that kills himself and most of the children. Weasel tries to save the last child, but the police shoot and arrest Weasel while the child dies. Weasel is incriminated for the deaths. In the present, Flag rejects Ilana's suggestion to execute Circe. Task Force M returns to Belle Reve, where Flag, Waller and A.R.G.U.S. agent John Economos interrogate Circe. She shows Waller a vision of an apocalyptic future where Ilana and her army have conquered the United States, massacring civilians and superheroes. After verifying Circe's clairvoyant power with Professor Aisla MacPherson, Waller orders Task Force M to return to Pokolistan and kill Ilana. Flag refuses, so Waller assigns the Bride to lead the team. Flag returns home, where he is ambushed by Eric, who has been secretly following Task Force M and came to believe the Bride is in love with Flag. Flag clears up the misunderstanding and the pair agree to work together to stop Task Force M from killing Ilana and reunite Eric with the Bride.
5	"The Iron Pot"	Matt Peters	James Gunn	December 26, 2024
In 1831, following the incident at Victor's mansion, an unconscious Eric is found by Bogdana, an old medicine woman, who nurses him back to health. After making a full recovery, Eric sets out to find the Bride despite Bogdana trying to convince him that the Bride does not love him back. Bogdana protests that she does not want to be alone, so Eric kills her. In the present, Eric and Flag investigate MacPherson and see her acting strangely. They infiltrate MacPherson's home and find her corpse, leading them to believe that the MacPherson who spoke to Waller was an imposter. Flag calls Ilana and warns her about Task Force M returning to assassinate her before the fake MacPherson returns home and is revealed to be Clayface. Flag and Eric attempt to sneak out, but are caught by Clayface. In the ensuing fight, Clayface critically injures Flag, then Eric defeats Clayface using electrical wires. Before passing out, Flag convinces Eric to tell the Bride the truth. Meanwhile, Ilana orders her army to detain Task Force M, sparking a battle where Task Force M gets separated. The Bride and Phosphorus kill various Pokolistan soldiers and knights, including Alexi.
6	"Priyatel Skelet"	Sam Liu	James Gunn	January 2, 2025
In flashbacks, nuclear scientist Alex Sartorius receives funding from mob boss Rupert Thorne to develop a cure for cancer using nuclear fusion. Alex realizes Thorne's intentions to share nuclear research with the fascist nation of Bialya and falsifies the results provided to Thorne. Upon discovering this, Thorne has Alex's family killed, frames him for his crimes, and tries to kill Alex with his nuclear equipment. Instead, Alex becomes a radioactive metahuman. Taking the name "Doctor Phosphorus", he kills Thorne and his family and takes over his criminal empire until he is defeated by Batman and imprisoned in Belle Reve. In the present, Eric sends Flag to a hospital and hijacks a private jet to reach Pokolistan. Phosphorus encounters and plays with a Pokolistani child, who reminds him of his son; the child's parents direct Phosphorus to Ilana's castle. The Bride and Nina find shelter in a brothel, where the Bride kills two violent metahumans visiting the brothel. Weasel escapes into a forest, where he befriends a wolf pack before leaving them to find Ilana, who reminds him of the child he tried to save. As Ilana assembles her forces, Task Force M reunites outside her castle.
7	"A Very Funny Monster"	Matt Peters	James Gunn	January 9, 2025
In flashbacks, Nina is born with lungs outside of her body. Her father, Edward, builds a device to help her breathe before experimenting on her, only to turn her into a piscine mutant. After years of homeschooling, he enrolls Nina in a private school to help her socialize. After being bullied by other students, Nina runs away and lives in Star City's sewers until the police arrest her. Edward intervenes, so the police kill him. In the present, Eric finds Task Force M, but the Bride shoots him and leaves him for dead. Upon finding Ilana, they task Nina with assassinating her, but a worried Weasel alerts Ilana, who kills Nina. Waller learns of Clayface's deception and orders Task Force M to stand down. Ilana ends hostilities with Task Force M. The Bride privately confronts Ilana, having deduced from video footage that Ilana tasked Clayface with discrediting MacPherson and Circe, hence tricking Flag and Waller. The Bride kills Ilana to avenge Nina. Sometime later, the Bride, Phosphorus, Nosferata, Khalis, Weasel, a rebuilt G.I., and King Shark form the new Task Force M. In a post-credits scene, a recovering Eric takes refuge with the old woman living near Victor's mansion.

=== Season 2 ===
The premiere episode of the second season, titled "Starry Night", was written by Dean Lorey.

== Production ==
=== Background ===
James Gunn was hired in October 2018 to write and direct The Suicide Squad (2021), a standalone sequel to the DC Extended Universe (DCEU) film Suicide Squad (2016) which retained some cast members but otherwise told its own story. He worked with producer Peter Safran, who also produced the DCEU films Aquaman (2018) and Shazam! (2019). They later expanded The Suicide Squad into a spin-off television series, Peacemaker (2022–2025), for the streaming service HBO Max. Discovery, Inc. and Warner Bros.' parent company WarnerMedia merged in April 2022 to become Warner Bros. Discovery (WBD), led by president and CEO David Zaslav. The new company was expected to restructure DC Entertainment and Zaslav began searching for an equivalent to Marvel Studios president Kevin Feige to lead the new subsidiary. Gunn and Safran were announced as the co-chairs and co-CEOs of the newly formed DC Studios at the end of October 2022. A week after starting their new roles, the pair had begun developing an eight-to-ten-year plan for a new DC Universe (DCU) that would be a "soft reboot" of the DCEU. Gunn and Safran said some cast members would return from The Suicide Squad and Peacemaker in the DCU, and a "rough memory" of the events of those projects would remain.

=== Development ===
Gunn discussed making an animated series for Max, the successor to HBO Max, after the success of Peacemaker. As Max was asking him for another show but knowing committing to one was a "big deal", Gunn was unsure on what to do, so he started playing off with ideas and came up with the show's concept as spec scripts, finishing them within a few weeks prior to his promotion. He wrote the seven-episode series without a deal, based on the Creature Commandos team of monsters from DC Comics. After he was hired to lead DC Studios, Gunn greenlit the project. On January 31, 2023, Gunn and Safran unveiled the first projects from their DCU slate, which begins with Chapter One: Gods and Monsters. The first project was Creature Commandos, which was expected to be released as an "aperitif" for the DCU before the film Superman (2025), with some characters from the series appearing in that film. Creature Commandos wasn't meant to be the franchise's "right entry point", but was chosen to be due to being already written. Gunn said the series was integral to their vision for the DCU, establishing the fact that characters would be treated consistently across different mediums moving forward. Warner Bros. Animation co-produced the series. Executive producers include DC Studios' Gunn and Safran, Warner Bros. Animation's Sam Register, and Dean Lorey. Lorey served as showrunner for the series, with Yves "Balak" Bigerel as supervising director and Warner Bros. Animation's Rick Morales as supervising producer. Gunn hired Lorey as showrunner due to his commitments to the DCU. Describing his involvement in the production, Gunn said the team took his scripts and made an "innately good" series that he suggested some improvements for.

Lorey and Gunn had discussed a potential second season by November 2024, but Lorey said it depended on Gunn having time to write more scripts. Gunn said he wanted Lorey and others who worked on the first season to return, even if the story continued in a different format, such as a Creature Commandos film rather than a second season. Ahead of the first season's finale, it was announced that Max had greenlit a second season in December 2024. Production for the second season had begun by June 2025. Gunn said the following month that the season would be written by a writers' room rather than by himself, adding in January 2026 that it would take place after the events of the second season of Peacemaker (2025). Gunn confirmed later in October 2026 that the season will release in HBO Max after Man of Tomorrow (2027) comes out in theaters.

=== Writing ===
Created for Weird War Tales #93 (1980) by J. M. DeMatteis and Pat Broderick, the Creature Commandos were originally a team of monsters fighting Nazis during World War II. The series depicts a modern version of the team being assembled by Amanda Waller following the events of the first season of Peacemaker. The team is also referred to as Task Force M, with the 'M' standing for monster. It includes Rick Flag Sr., Nina Mazursky, Alex Sartorius / Doctor Phosphorus, Eric Frankenstein, the Bride, G.I. Robot, and Weasel. Gunn said the Bride was the lead character. Waller, Weasel, and Flag's son Rick Flag Jr. previously appeared in The Suicide Squad (2021). Much like with The Suicide Squad, Gunn considered different characters that did not make it to the titular team's roster in the finished version, such as comic book members Warren Griffith / Wolfpack and Vincent Velcro and personal favorites Man-Bat and Solomon Grundy. However, he removed Griffith and Man-Bat because he felt that there would be "too many rabid and fuzzy" characters if he included them alongside Weasel, whose story he was set on telling, and Grundy as he was set on including Frankenstein. Additionally, Gunn replaced Velcro with Phosphorus so he could have a "creature" far outside the team's usual roster. Furthermore, Gunn considered Nosferata and ape characters like Congorilla, with both making cameo appearances in the fourth episode and the former joining the team in the first season finale.

Each episode of the first season, with the exception of the first episode, centers on a different member of the team along with Eric Frankenstein, with the exception of Rick Flag Sr., similar to the series Lost (2004–2010). In his pitch for the series, Gunn described it as dark, "humorous but never goofy", and unsentimental, with adult and political themes. He was influenced by the Universal Classic Monsters, manga series Golgo 13 (1968–present), and 1960s war films. The characterization of Frankenstein and the Bride took inspiration from Mary Shelley's original Frankenstein novel (1818) rather than Boris Karloff's Frankenstein film (1931). Grillo said the series was "hard R" with a "funny and filthy" tone, and "X-rated" sex scenes. Morales described it as a "macabre spin" on action ensembles such as the film The Dirty Dozen (1967) and the series The A-Team (1983–1987). Gunn compared the series to The Suicide Squad and his Marvel Cinematic Universe (MCU) film Guardians of the Galaxy (2014), noting that they are both focused on "outcasts and irregular types and weirdoes" but Creature Commandos is less sentimental than Guardians of the Galaxy due to the different moral allegiances of each team.

=== Casting and voice recording ===
Early promotional art released in January 2023 featuring the titular team's designs: (L–R) Rick Flag Sr., Nina Mazursky, Doctor Phosphorus, Eric Frankenstein, the Bride, G.I. Robot, and Weasel

Gunn and Safran said Viola Davis would reprise her role as Amanda Waller from The Suicide Squad and Peacemaker in the DCU, and she was confirmed to be voicing the character in Creature Commandos with the series' announcement. Further casting was underway by then, with Gunn and Safran intending to hire actors who could voice the characters in the series and also portray them in live-action DCU projects, with Gunn assuring it's 100% to happen; actors performed on-camera auditions instead of voice-over ones. Casting was almost complete by late February 2023.

The cast was announced in April, with Frank Grillo as Rick Flag Sr.; Maria Bakalova as Princess Ilana Rostovic, an original character created for the series; Zoë Chao as Nina Mazursky; Alan Tudyk as Alex Sartorius / Doctor Phosphorus; David Harbour as Eric Frankenstein; Indira Varma as the Bride; Sean Gunn as G.I. Robot in addition to returning as Weasel from The Suicide Squad; and Steve Agee reprising his role as John Economos from The Suicide Squad and Peacemaker. James Gunn said Harbour was his first choice for Frankenstein, and some of the actors, including Grillo, were already planned for live-action appearances. Gunn had wanted to work with Grillo for a while and said he would "find something cool" for Grillo to do in the DCU, leading to his casting as Flag Sr. in multiple projects. Voice recording began by May 2023, and was completed by that August. Unlike most Hollywood projects where actor schedules do not align, the show's actors were able to record together mostly because the showrunners felt the energy between them had to feel real, with Varma and Chao or Grillo with Harbour and Bakalova recording together for example, "fangirling" each other. Gunn served as the voice director for the main actors.

In November 2023, Anya Chalotra was reported to have been cast as Circe, which Gunn confirmed in January 2024. In October 2024, Michael Rooker, Linda Cardellini, Gregg Henry, Peter Serafinowicz, and Benjamin Byron Davis were revealed to have guest roles in the series, and the character Clayface was revealed to be appearing. Rooker readily accepted the role as per custom due to always "making favours" to Gunn whenever he needs him, just like Cardellini, whom Gunn considers another one of his close friends. At that time, Davis was confirmed to be voicing Rupert Thorne in the series. Tudyk stated the next month that he would reprise his role as Clayface from the Harley Quinn (2019–present) animated series. When Gunn told Tudyk that he would be voicing the character again, Tudyk was already planning to ask if he could. Gunn revealed in late November that Tudyk was also voicing Will Magnus in the series.

In April 2026, journalist Jeff Sneider reported that Sydney Chandler—the daughter of the DCU's Hal Jordan / Green Lantern actor Kyle Chandler—had been cast in the second season to voice Nosferata, who had joined the titular team at the end of the first season finale. This came after Chandler unsuccessfully auditioned for the role of Maxima in the DCU film Man of Tomorrow (2027). In September 2026, James Gunn confirmed that voice recording was already underway and that his brother Sean would reprise his roles as G.I. Robot and Weasel for the second season. The following month, Gunn confirmed that Nanaue / King Shark will be a regular in the season as well when confirming The Suicide Squad remains canon within the DCU, although he will be voiced by Diedrich Bader instead of Sylvester Stallone. While promoting Violent Night 2 in November 2026, Harbour confirmed that he will return as Eric in the second season and that he had already recorded some lines for the new episodes, praising Gunn's writing for the characters while noting the "crazy" character arcs some of them had in the season.

=== Animation and design ===
Production was underway by the end of January 2023. Gunn said animation was a way to "tell stories that are gigantic" without a large budget. Animation studio Bobbypills worked on the pre-production, whereas Studio IAM worked on the main production of the series. By February 2024, the initial animatics had been finished and picture locked. Gunn said "elaborate animated finals" were being worked on. The series adheres to Gunn's mandate for a cohesive approach to the DCU, so characters and locations can move between mediums and be familiar to audiences. The designers initially redesigned Belle Reve prison to be a "beautiful gothic locale on top of a hill", but Gunn told them that it had to match the "dull, boring building" design seen in The Suicide Squad. New locations, such as Frankenstein's mansion, feature designs closer to the original Belle Reve look. Despite this, Gunn stated in October 2024 that he was "not imposing any overall aesthetic" on the DCU and wanted each project to be "its own thing". Lorey said the series had an Eastern European style that was grounded but stylized, and different from Harley Quinn. The sixth episode marks Bruce Wayne / Batman's first appearance in the DCU, introducing him in a way that implies he is already an established hero like Clark Kent / Superman without the need to retell his origin story; the original idea involved showing more of Batman's design but Gunn didn't feel ready yet to commit to an official look before Batman's proper debut in the upcoming The Brave and the Bold film, so he requested a silhouetted appearance instead.

=== Music ===
In August 2024, Gunn revealed that Kevin Kiner and Clint Mansell were composing the score for the series. The pair previously scored the first season of Peacemaker. Creature Commandos' theme song is a version of "Moliendo Café" by Venezuelan artist Hugo Blanco, performed by Romani band Fanfare Ciocărlia. When developing the series, Gunn created a "musical mood-board" inspired by the works of Gogol Bordello and the Dresden Dolls.

== Marketing ==
A making-of session and presentation for the series with Balak and Morales took place at the 2024 Annecy International Animation Film Festival. Gunn was unable to attend due to his filming schedule for Superman, but he introduced the presentation via a video message. Two storyboard sequences were shown along with character and location designs. Rafael Motamayor of /Film and Kambole Campbell of Animation Magazine both criticized Gunn's video message as boring and too focused on corporate strategy. They were more positive about the rest of the presentation and the footage that was shown, but expressed concern that the needs of the wider DCU were being put ahead of what was best for the series; Motamayor said the change from the new Belle Reve design to one more similar to The Suicide Squad was met with "palpable disappointment" during the presentation. They both praised other design elements. Campbell hoped the creative intentions of Balak and Bobbypills would come through in the final series with more prominence than the needs of corporate synergy.

Gunn made a surprise appearance during a San Diego Comic-Con panel for DC Comics COO Jim Lee in July 2024 and released the first teaser trailer for the series. Based on the teaser, James Whitbrook at Gizmodo said Gunn was "taking his Suicide Squad ideas even wilder" with the series, while Molly Edwards of GamesRadar+ described the teaser as a "colorful, madcap ride". Charles Barfield at The Playlist said the style, tone, and structure of the series appeared to be similar to Gunn's Guardians of the Galaxy and The Suicide Squad films, again bringing together a "group of disparate characters" to fight some villains. A full trailer was released during a panel for the series at New York Comic Con in October, attended by James Gunn, Lorey, Grillo, Harbour, Chao, Agee, Bakalova, Tudyk, and Sean Gunn. Writing about the trailer for The A.V. Club, William Hughes said the series "looks fun as hell" and like "classic Gunn 'superhero' fare: Darkly funny, energetic, and gory". Gizmodo's Justin Carter said the trailer was "a bunch of monstrous fun", and Eric Francisco of Vulture said it has "a vivid art and animation style with deep, bold colors". He added that the trailer "goes hard and heavy on the bloodletting"; multiple other commentators also noted the violence and gore depicted in the trailer.

== Release ==
Creature Commandos premiered on the streaming service Max on December 5, 2024, with its first two episodes. The other five episodes of the first season were released weekly until January 9, 2025. It is the first entry in the DCU's Chapter One: Gods and Monsters. The show was made available to watch in the UK on Sky Max on July 8, 2025.

== Reception ==
=== Critical response ===
Professional ratings
Aggregate scores
Source	Rating
Metacritic	74/100
Rotten Tomatoes	93%
Review scores
Source	Rating
Collider	8/10
ComicBook.com	5/5 stars
IGN	8/10
Looper	7.5/10
Screen Rant	8/10
Total Film	4/5 stars

Reviews for Creature Commandos were positive. On the review aggregator website Rotten Tomatoes, 93% of 42 critics' reviews are positive, with an average rating of 7.9/10. The website's consensus reads: "Bearing writer James Gunn's trademark penchant for kooky humor and lovable characters, Creature Commandos marks an auspicious debut for the DCU." Metacritic, which uses a weighted average, assigned the film a score of 74 out of 100, based on 12 critics, indicating "generally favorable" reviews.

The A.V. Club said that "there's no mistaking it for anything but a byproduct of Gunn's horror/junk/sleaze-addled mind", and that Creature Commandos was another successful example of Gunn bringing success to niche characters, as he did with Guardians of the Galaxy. Screen Rant's Ben Gibbons felt similarly about Gunn's ability to highlight obscure characters in his work. Though Gibbons felt the first episode was a copy of Gunn's introduction to Suicide Squad's team, he said the show picked up afterwards, and pointed out Gunn's use of music and the "beautiful" animation style. He concluded the show "combines individually strong elements that are executed to a high standard, creating a very worthy foundation for the DCU". Collider felt that it was natural for Gunn to tell a "sympathetic" story about misfits, and felt that these misfits were played well as relatable and human. They said the series did well to play-off of Gunn's creative strengths, and praised the animation style, which was a spot between the cartoonish TV series Harley Quinn and the "self-serious" aspect of the typical DC direct-to-video film.

ComicBook.com's Charlie Ridgely gave Creature Commandos a 5 out of 5 rating, declaring "you'll fall in love with every single member of this team, and perhaps almost every character on the show". Ridgely said the series was able to tell its story through the "breeze" of its half-hour episodes, and praised Gunn's knack for "making you laugh and cry in equal measure, while never sacrificing the story to do so", an element Ridgely found a clear example to Gunn's story-first vision for the DCU. IGN gave it an 8/10, admitting its style was not for everyone, questioning the DCEU–DCU canon overlap, and feeling it was a surprising direction for the DCU, but declared it a "solid job" at bridging old DC TV and films with the new, and praised Gunn's ability to bring heart to the "goofiest, raunchiest" characters. Total Film's Lauren Milici gave praise to the NSFW elements, crude humor and violence, feeling they were refreshing, and praised the complex, likable anti-heroes, but threw shade at its length and how Economos and Flag were "underused".

JoBlo.com's Steve Seigh said that "if there's one thing James Gunn is incredibly good at, it's mixing action, comedy, and drama into a compelling narrative with characters that present depth and complexity". He called it "cinematic" in presentation and pace, and praised the "standout" voice performances of Grillo, Varma, Bakalova, and Chao. Looper said "basically, Creature Commandos is the most James Gunn cartoon to have ever James Gunn-ed", and said this was mostly good, meaning Gunn's work was "entertainingly twisted" yet kept emotional sincerity, though nothing new was accomplished. Inverse's Ryan Britt thought the team "aren't remotely aspirational", and feel like "benchwarmers" for the Suicide Squad. He said Gunn's work was expected, yet remained a good show for fans, but questioned its position as the first entry of the DCU reboot due to its familiarity.

=== Ratings ===
The series became the third most-watched show in the first full week of release for any show on Max, according to Luminate, garnering a viewership of 22 million minutes.

=== Accolades ===
Creature Commandos was nominated for Outstanding Achievement for Editorial in an Animated Television / Broadcast Production for Annie De Brock on the episode "Cheers to the Tin Man" at the 52nd Annie Awards.
