= Ice Cream Soldier =

Ice Cream Soldier may refer to:

- Ice Cream Soldier (DC Comics), a member of Sgt. Rock's Easy Company
- Ice Cream Soldier (G.I. Joe), a member of G.I. Joe

== See also ==
- Ice Soldiers, a 2013 film
