= Mazurka (disambiguation) =

Mazurka is a Polish folk dance in triple meter.

Mazurka may also refer to:

- A number of musical compositions, including:
  - Mazurkas (Chopin), written by Frédéric Chopin
  - Dąbrowski's Mazurka, the national anthem of Poland
- Mazurka (film), 1935 German drama film
- Operation Mazurka, Australian Defence Force's contribution to the Multinational Force and Observers
- "Mazurka" is a variant of toe loop jump in figure skating

== See also ==
- Mazurek (disambiguation)
