= Mazur =

Mazur can refer to:

== People ==
- Masovians or Mazurs, an ethnic group with historic origins in the Polish region of Mazovia
- Masurians or Mazurs, a related ethnic group with origins in Masuria
- Mazur (surname), including a list of people so named

== Other uses ==
- Mazur (dance), a traditional Polish folk dance
- Mazur, Iran, a village in Markazi Province
- ORP Mazur, ships of the Polish Navy

== See also ==
- Masur (disambiguation)
- Mazor (disambiguation)
- Mazurek (disambiguation)
- Mazurski
- Mazyr, a city in Gomel Region of Belarus
- Mazyr District, Belarus
