= Mazurek (surname) =

Other names
- Variant forms: Mazurkowa, Mazurkówna, Mazurkowie, Mazur, Mazurka

Mazurek (archaic feminine Mazurkowa for "wife"; Mazurkówna for "daughter of Mr. Mazurek"; Mazurkowie for plural) is one of the most common surnames in Poland and the 2nd most popular in Lublin Land (9,644). It is uncommon as a given name. People with the name include:

== People ==
- Beata Mazurek (born 1967), Polish politician
- Bartosz Mazurek (born 2007), Polish football player
- Edward Mazurek (1938–2017), American politician from Maine
- Franco Mazurek (born 1993), Argentine football player
- Fred Mazurek (born 1943), American football player
- Joseph P. Mazurek (1948–2012), American politician and attorney from Montana
- Marcin Mazurek (born 1998), Polish film music composer
- Marta Mazurek (born 1990), Polish film actress
- Rob Mazurek (born 1965), American jazz musician
- Robert Mazurek (journalist) (born 1971), Polish journalist
- Zuzanna Mazurek (born 1991), Polish swimmer
- Milan Mazurek (born 1994), Slovak politician

== See also ==
- Mazur (surname)
- Masur (surname)
- Mazurski, Mazursky
- Mazurka
- Mazurik
