= Mazurek =

Mazurek may refer to:

- Mazurek (surname) (includes a list of people with the name)
- Mazurek (cake), a traditional Polish Easter cake
- Mazurek was the sloop used by Krystyna Chojnowska-Liskiewicz for her circumnavigation
- Polish name for the Mazurka, a dance and type of music
  - "Dąbrowski's Mazurka" (Mazurek Dąbrowskiego), the Polish national anthem, written by Józef Wybicki in 1797

== See also ==
- Mazur (disambiguation)
- Mazurik
