= Mazursky =

Mazurski or Mazursky is a Polish language family name derived, as an adjective, from the words "Mazur" or "Mazury" (Mazovia) and meaning "of Mazur" or "from Mazur". Notable people with the surname include:

- Paul Mazursky (1930–2014), American film director, screenwriter and actor
- Mazursky family, several characters in the film Alpha Dog
- Alexis and Hernan Mazurski, members of Uruguay national roller hockey team (2010 squad)
- Nina Mazursky, a fictional character in DC Comics and Max Original Creature Commandos
