= Rupert Thorne =

- Rupert Thorne as depicted in Detective Comics #469 (May 1977). Art by Walt Simonson (penciller), Al Milgrom (inker), and Jerry Serpe (colorist).

Publication information
- Publisher: DC Comics
- First appearance: Detective Comics #469 (May 1977)
- Created by: Steve Englehart (writer); Walt Simonson (artist)

In-story information
- Species: Human

Rupert Thorne is a fictional character appearing in comic books published by DC Comics. The character is a crooked politician, a crime boss, and an enemy of Batman.

Thorne has made several appearances in animated DC media, such as Batman: The Animated Series, in which he is voiced by John Vernon, and the DC Universe animated series Creature Commandos, voiced by Benjamin Byron Davis.

== Publication history ==
Created by Steve Englehart and Walter Simonson, the character first appeared in Detective Comics #469.

== Fictional character biography ==
Rupert Thorne is a corrupt politician with extensive ties to organized crime and ambitions of becoming a crime boss in his own right. Doctor Phosphorus blackmails him with evidence of his crimes into turning Gotham City against Batman. After Phosphorus is defeated, Thorne decides not to waste the opportunity and persuades his fellow city councilors to declare Batman an outlaw. He attempts to gain complete control of Gotham by running for mayor, but fails.

Thorne, Penguin, and Joker make a bid at Hugo Strange's secret auction to be told Batman's secret identity. Thorne kidnaps and tortures Strange to force him to divulge Batman's identity rather than risk losing the auction. Strange resists, however, and apparently dies in the process. After disposing of his body, Thorne is haunted by eerie sounds and visions of Strange.

After failing in his campaign against Batman and spending some time in hiding, Thorne secretly returns to Gotham City. He gets Hamilton Hill elected as the mayor of Gotham and orders him to fire Police Commissioner James Gordon in favor of Peter Pauling, who is on Thorne's payroll. Thorne finally identifies Bruce Wayne as Batman after acquiring photos of him changing into his costume from reporter Vicki Vale. Thorne then hires Deadshot to kill Wayne. Deadshot is unsuccessful, but before Thorne can deal with the problem, he begins to succumb to Strange's manipulations; Strange is revealed to have faked his death while using elaborate special-effects devices to simulate ghostly encounters. Thorne becomes paranoid, convinced that Hill and Pauling are plotting against him and trying to drive him insane. Thorne kills Pauling, but is eventually apprehended by Batman.

In 2016, DC Comics implemented a relaunch of its books called DC Rebirth, which restored its continuity to a form much as it was prior to The New 52 reboot. Thorne and the city councilors in his payroll established the Oceangate Nuclear Power Plant on the outskirts of Gotham City following the destruction of the plant that Alex Sartorius worked at. Thorne is investigated by the police following the murder of councilwoman Ann Vinton, who was killed with a radioactive bullet. Batman reasons that Thorne and Sartorius were involved in the murder, as the bullet was coated with Sartorius' blood.

== Other versions ==
An alternate universe version of Rupert Thorne appears in Gotham by Gaslight. This version is a respected member of Gotham's city council who later becomes interim mayor in the aftermath of Jack the Ripper's killing spree.

== In other media ==
=== Television ===
- Rupert Thorne appears in Batman: The Animated Series, voiced by John Vernon. This version is Gotham's most powerful crime boss who contributed to Two-Face's creation.
- Rupert Thorne appears in The Batman episode "The Bat in the Belfry", voiced by Victor Brandt.
- Rupert Thorne appears in Batman: Caped Crusader, voiced by Cedric Yarbrough. This version is a politician, crime boss, and rival of the Penguin who, like the Batman: The Animated Series incarnation, contributed to Two-Face's creation. In the premiere of second season, Thorne is killed by the Joker and his body later frozen by Mr. Zero.
- Rupert Thorne appears in flashbacks in the DCU's Creature Commandos episode "Priyatel Skelet", voiced by Benjamin Byron Davis. This version is an industrialist who financed Alex Sartorius' efforts to create a cure for cancer via nuclear fusion in exchange for access to Sartorius's findings so he can sell it to the country of Bialya. Upon discovering Sartorius gave him falsified data, Thorne has Sartorius' family killed, frames him for it, and attempts to kill him with his nuclear equipment. However, Sartorius transforms into Doctor Phosphorus, kills Thorne and his family, and takes over his criminal empire.

=== Film ===
- Rupert Thorne was originally intended to appear in Batman (1989) before he was replaced with film-original character Carl Grissom (portrayed by Jack Palance).
- Rupert Thorne appears in Batman: Mystery of the Batwoman, voiced again by John Vernon.

=== Video games ===
- Rupert Thorne appears in the Sega CD version of The Adventures of Batman & Robin, voiced again by John Vernon.
- Rupert Thorne appears as a character summon in Scribblenauts Unmasked: A DC Comics Adventure.

=== Miscellaneous ===
- Rupert Thorne appears in The Batman Strikes!.
- An alternate universe version of Rupert Thorne appears in the Justice League: Gods and Monsters prequel comic.

== See also ==
- List of Batman family enemies
