= Masur (surname) =

Masur is a surname signifying membership in the Masurians ethnic group. Related surnames include "Mazur" and "Mazurek".

- Andy Masur (born 1967), American sportscaster
- Daniel Masur (born 1994), German tennis player
- David Masur (born 1962), American soccer player
- Harold Q. Masur (1909–2005), American author
- Howard Masur, American mathematician
- Jonathan Masur, American legal scholar
- Kate Masur (active 2022), American author
- Ken-David Masur (born 1977), German conductor
- Kurt Masur (1927–2015), German conductor
- Louis Masur (born 1957), American historian
- Norbert Masur (1901–1971), Swedish representative to the World Jewish Congress
- Richard Masur (born 1948), American actor
- Wally Masur (born 1963), Australian tennis player
