= Piotr Mazur =

Polish cyclist

Personal information
- Full name: Piotr Mazur
- Born: December 2, 1982 (age 43) Vancouver, Canada
- Height: 1.77 m (5 ft 10 in)
- Weight: 73 kg (161 lb)

Cycling career
- Sport: Cycling
- Current team: Retired
- Discipline: Road
- Role: Rider

Amateur teams
- 2003: Bonda
- 2004: Moser–AH.nl
- 2005: Navigators Insurance (stagiaire)

Professional teams
- 2005: Skil–Moser
- 2006–2007: Saunier Duval–Prodir
- 2008: CCC Polsat–Polkowice

Major wins
- (Poland) National time-trial champion (2005–2006)

Piotr Mazur (born December 2, 1982) is a Polish former professional road bicycle racer. He rode in the 2006 Giro d'Italia, but did not finish.

== Major results ==
1999
3rd Overall Tour de la région de Łódź

1st Stage 2

2000
1st Time trial, UCI Junior Road World Championships
1st Overall UCI Junior World Challenge
1st Overall Tour de l'Abitibi

1st Stage 5

1st Overall Course de la Paix Juniors
3rd Overall Coupe du Président de la Ville de Grudziądz

1st Prologue & Stage 2

2003
1st Lubelski Wyscig 3-Majowy
2004
1st Young rider classification Tour de Pologne
2nd Chrono des Nations Espoirs
3rd Overall Course de Solidarność et des Champions Olympiques
7th Time trial, UCI Under-23 Road World Championships
2005
National Road Championships

1st Time trial
3rd Road race

1st Glasgow Criterium
3rd Overall Dookoła Mazowsza
2006
1st Time trial, National Road Championships

== Personal life ==
Mazur was born in Vancouver, Canada. His father Mirek Mazur is a Canadian cycling coach.
