= ORP Mazur =

ORP Mazur may refer to one of two ships of the Polish Navy:

- ORP Mazur (1922), the ex-German torpedo boat, V-105, launched in 1914, transferred to Poland in 1921 and sunk in 1939
- ORP Mazur (1954), a Soviet M-class submarine which served with the Polish Navy from 1954 to 1965
