= Masur-e Abi =

Masur-e Abi ماسورابي
- Village
- Location within Iran
- Coordinates: 33°24′03″N 48°55′57″E
- Country: Iran
- Province: Lorestan
- County: Dorud
- Bakhsh: Central
- Rural District: Dorud

Population (2006)
  - Total: 66
- Time zone: UTC+3:30 (IRST)
  - Summer (DST): UTC+4:30 (IRDT)

Masur-e Abi (Persian: ماسورابي, also Romanized as Māsūr-e Ābī; also known as Māsūr) is a village in Dorud Rural District, in the Central District of Dorud County, Lorestan Province, Iran. At the 2006 census, its population was 66, in 15 families.
