= Jonathan Masur =

American legal scholar

Jonathan S. Masur
- Born: October 17, 1977 (age 47)
- Education: Stanford University (A.B., B.S.); Harvard Law School (J.D.)
- Employer: University of Chicago Law School
- Known for: Behavioral law and economics, intellectual property, and criminal law

Jonathan S. Masur is an American legal scholar who is currently the John P. Wilson Professor of Law at the University of Chicago Law School. He writes and teaches primarily in the areas of behavioral law and economics, intellectual property, and criminal law Masur also directs the Wachtell, Lipton, Rosen & Katz Program in Behavioral Law, Finance, and Economics.

== Education and career ==
Masur began his career working as a research assistant at Fermilab in Batavia, Illinois, in the summers of 1995 and 1996 and at the Lawrence Livermore National Laboratory in Livermore, California, in the summer of 1997. He graduated from Stanford University with an A.B. with distinction (majoring in political science) and a B.S. (majoring in physics) with distinction in 1999. He later worked as a legislative assistant to U.S. Representative Zoe Lofgren of the Democratic Party before earning his J.D. magna cum laude from Harvard Law School.

After graduating from law school, Masur worked as a law clerk for Judge Marilyn Hall Patel on the U.S. District Court for the Northern District of California and for Judge Richard A. Posner on the U.S. Court of Appeals for the Seventh Circuit.

In 2007, Masur joined the University of Chicago Law School faculty as an assistant professor of law, having served as a Bigelow Teaching Fellow for two years. He became a professor of law in 2012 and the John P. Wilson Professor of Law in 2014. He served as deputy dean of the law school between 2012 and 2014. His teaching and research focuses on behavioral law and economics, administrative law, and criminal law. He is the co-author of Patent Law: Cases, Problems, and Materials (2021), Cannons and Codes in War in Law and Literature (2020) and Happiness and the Law (2014). Masur is one of the most cited active intellectual property scholars in the United States.
