= Mirek Mazur =

Canadian cycling coach (born 1961)

Mirek Mazur (born January 12, 1961, in Jelcz, Poland) is a Canadian cycling coach. His coaching career spanned 30 years, coaching professionally in Canada (National Coach at 1991 Pan-Am Games) USA (1998 National Coach) and Poland. Developed three world champions in three different countries (Poland, US, Canada). Under his direction, Canadian riders won three medals at the Olympic Games in Atlanta in 1996. Cycling coach of Clara Hughes, the only person ever to have won multiple medals in both Summer and Winter Olympics. His rider was the first Canadian woman to win a medal in road cycling at the Olympics, winning two in the 1996 Atlanta Olympics. His son Piotr Mazur has won 2000 World Junior Time Trial Championship and 2000 Junior World Cup overall.
