= Creature Commandos =

Fictional DC Comics military team

- Weird War Tales #93 (November 1980), the first appearance of the original Creature Commandos, art by Joe Kubert.

Publication information
- Publisher: DC Comics
- First appearance: Weird War Tales #93 (November 1980)
- Created by: J. M. DeMatteis (writer); Pat Broderick (artist)

In-story information
- Type of organization: Military unit
- Base(s): Project M (modern version)
- Agent(s): Aten; Bogman; Gunner; Hunter; Medusa; Patchwork; Velcoro; Wolfpack; G.I. Robot; Matthew Shrieve

The Creature Commandos is the name of several military special forces groups appearing in American comic books published by DC Comics. Co-created by writer J. M. DeMatteis and artist Pat Broderick, the team first appeared in Weird War Tales #93 (November 1980).

The Creature Commandos are a special forces group consisting of individuals either resembling or are in some way a monster or robotic entity. Led by, in most instances, a seasoned human general officer, the team tackles missions that are often fantastical or too dangerous for ordinary soldiers.

The team has been adapted into a HBO Max animated series of the same name (2024–present), which served as the first installment in the DC Universe (DCU) series of films and television shows.

== Concept and creation ==
Asked how the Creature Commandos came about, writer J. M. DeMatteis recalled:

I was doing [Weird] War Tales for about six months before the DC Implosion put me out of work for almost a year. And the last idea I had... I took a look at the title, Weird War, and I said, "Ya gotta have a lot of monsters". ... then after I was getting work there again was when they were trying to revivify the mystery books by putting series in them. So I went to Len [Wein, editor] with the Creature Commandos—the actual title may have been Len's; I think it was—and he said the same thing: "That's so silly that it will work. Let's do it". And we did it and it was silly and nothing came of it and the book died anyway.

DeMatteis did not stay on the feature very long, and his replacement was Robert Kanigher, who wrote the series until Weird War Tales was canceled in 1983.

== Fictional team history ==
=== Project M ===
Project M is a secret government organization that began during World War II and specializes in experimental biotechnology and necromancy. Known creations of the Project beside the Creature Commandos include Miss America and G.I. Robot. The Project's main scientist is Professor Mazursky. Mazursky, along with Robert Crane, operates from a secret underground complex on the mythical Ferris Island in New York.

Panel from Weird War Tales #119 (January 1983), art by Fred Carrillo.

In 1942, Project M creates the Creature Commandos, largely consisting of humans who were experimented on and transformed to resemble monsters. The group consists of Lt. Matthew Shrieve (a normal human), Warren Griffith (a werewolf), Sgt. Vincent Velcro (a vampire), Pvt. Elliot Taylor (a Frankensteinian monster) and Dr. Myrra Rhodes (a gorgon).

=== World War II ===
The team's first mission is in France, where they destroy Nazi-manufactured android duplicates of the Allied leaders. In their next mission to France to free scientist Dr. Renee Frederique, the Commandos find Frederique in a death camp and are forced to kill her, as her knowledge of a chemical nerve gas is too risky to be left in Nazi hands. Because of his part in the killing, Taylor attempts suicide. Although doctors attempt to repair him, he remains mute for the rest of the series. On another morally dubious mission, the team causes the deaths of dozens of super soldier children.

In 1943, the Commandos are deployed to Dinosaur Island in the South Pacific. They are supposed to solve the disappearance of several Allied spotter planes, but discover a hidden Axis naval base and trick the dinosaurs in turning on the Japanese navy. Shrieve takes pictures for his commanders as proof of the island's existence, but Velcro destroys them, believing that the war would bring destruction to the dinosaurs if the island became public knowledge.

When the team returns to Dinosaur Island, they meet J.A.K.E. 1, the G.I. Robot. Together, the team discovers an underwater civilization, a supposed lost colony of Atlantis situated in the Pacific. The lost colony had created a group of robots to carry on the work of Atlantean conquest. The androids take control of G.I. Robot, who ultimately overrides their commands and sacrifices itself to destroy the colony.

At the end of the war, the Creature Commandos and J.A.K.E. 2 (and both its robot dog C.A.P. and C.A.P.'s robot cat) are forced to man a rocket aimed at Berlin. However, the rocket goes off course and heads into deep space. Much later, the Creature Commandos appear as captives in Brainiac's ship.

=== Modern era ===
Cover of Creature Commandos #1 (May 2000), art by Scott Eaton and Ray Kryssing.

The original team, with J.A.K.E. 2, is freed from Brainiac's ship, which is now controlled by the inhabitants of Kandor. Frankenstein, whose sense of time is not the same as his comrades, convinces his group to trust Superman and they join in with a fight against the threat that freed them, an attack by Reactron and Metallo.

Somehow, the original team later returns to Earth and to Project M, where they continue to serve as a special operations force. To keep pace with their aging physiology, Mazursky, the doctor who had originally mutated them, continues to perform a series of body modifications, extending their lives at the cost of their humanity.

At an unspecified date in the near future, the various original team members adopt code names. Project M continues to grow in size, and the original team form the core field team codenamed M-Team Alpha. M-Team Alpha is sporadically infused with new operatives as attrition took its toll. Presumably, Lt. Shrieve died or retired along the way. He is replaced by Capt. Lucius Hunter, a former member of Hunter's Hellcats who received extensive body modifications and rejuvenation therapies. Other new members are: Aten, a mummy-like communications specialist; the Bogman, a humanoid amphibian grunt resembling the Gill-man; and recently-revived cyborg Gunner Mackey, who — along with his partner "Sarge" — died during World War II. Both Hunter and Mackey were featured characters in Our Fighting Forces.

While deep undercover, Medusa discovers that Earth's dimension was in danger of invasion by a military alliance from the alternate Earth of Terra Arcana. This other-dimensional conglomerate of warlords includes Lord Saturna, Hyathis of Alstair, Tazzala of Korrl, Sayvar the reptilian Lord of Llarr, Kraad of Kranaal, Simon Magus of Blackstaff, Xotar the Weapons Master, Kromm of Mosteel, and the Troll King.

In order to conquer Earth, the one remaining free dimension, Saturna's alliance enlists the assistance of a powerful consortium on Future Earth. This group from Earth gives weapons and teleportation technology to the alliance in return for alien real estate. Tazzala and Magus soon betray Saturna, cutting their own deal with Murray. In M-Team Alpha's raid on Terra Arcana, Velcro and Gunner are captured by Claw the Unconquered. Claw is convinced to ally with them, with his people joining the battle against Saturna. In the end, Tazzala killed Saturna and was herself killed. Terra Arcana's future was then left in the hands of its people.

=== The New 52 ===
In The New 52 reboot of DC's continuity, a new version of the Creature Commandos is introduced and featured in the series Frankenstein, Agent of S.H.A.D.E.. This incarnation of the team works as field agents for the secretive organization S.H.A.D.E. and are led by Frankenstein. The rest of the team consists of Khalis (a mummy), Warren Griffith, and Vincent Velcoro. Griffith and Velcoro were both originally humans who volunteered to be mutated by Nina Mazursky, who later mutates herself into an amphibious creature to fight alongside the team. Frankenstein's estranged wife the Bride is also a member of the team until she leaves after learning the fate of her son, with Shrieve returning to the team later on.

== Membership ==
=== Original team ===
- Warren Griffith – A timid farm boy who suffered from clinical lycanthropy, irrationally believing himself to be a werewolf. Project M gave Griffith the ability to change into a true werewolf, but his transformations are erratic and uncontrollable due to a flaw in the serum that created him.
- J.A.K.E. – The first G.I. Robot. Destroyed itself and a lost Atlantean colony.
- J.A.K.E. 2 – The second G.I. Robot, lost in space with the Creature Commandos.
- Dr. Myrra Rhodes (also spelled Myrna) – Also known as Dr. Medusa. After inhaling strange fumes, she grew living snakes for hair, causing her to resemble Medusa.
- Lt. Matthew Shrieve – Matthew was their team leader. He was a fully human hard-as-nails soldier.
- Pvt. Elliot Taylor – Lucky barely survived stepping on a mine. He was stitched back together against his will, so he resembles the Frankenstein Monster and has damaged vocal cords.
- Sgt. Vincent Velcro (also spelled Velcoro) – Velcro volunteered for the project in order to commute a 30-year sentence in the brig for crippling an officer. His powers come from a compound that contains vampire bat DNA. Like a vampire, Velcro can now change into a bat and requires human blood to survive.

=== Modern team ===
- Aten – A mummy-like communications specialist.
- The Bogman – A humanoid amphibian grunt resembling the Gill-man.
- Gunner MacKay – A cyborg, who died during World War II.
- Captain Lucius Hunter – The 74-year-old former member of Hunter's Hellcats.
- Dr. Medusa (Dr. Myrra Rhodes) – An individual whose body has mutated even further into a Gorgon-like form since her first appearances.
- Patchwork (Elliot "Lucky" Taylor) – An individual who is pretty much the same as before.
- Vincent Velcro – Like Myrra, he has mutated even further due to his treatments and now has red skin and a white ponytail.
- Wolfpack (Warren Griffith) – He is even more savage and out-of-control in this incarnation.

=== The Agents of S.H.A.D.E. ===
- Father Time – Leader of S.H.A.D.E.
- Dr. Ray Palmer – U.N. Scientist Liaison, formerly the Atom, creator of S.H.A.D.E. City and the majority of S.H.A.D.E.'s technology.
- Frankenstein – The Frankenstein Monster. He has taken the name solely for simplicity. Frankenstein acts as the team leader.
- Bride of Frankenstein – Frankenstein's female creation, was intended to be Frankenstein's mate, but refused. She was the first official S.H.A.D.E. agent, but is currently retired in Frankenstein: Agent of S.H.A.D.E. #8 after it was revealed that Father Time reanimated and imprisoned her and Frankenstein's son in "the Zoo".
- Dr. Nina Mazursky – An amphibious humanoid resembling the Gill-man, Mazursky is the team's scientist and the founder of S.H.A.D.E.'s Creature Commandos.
- Vincent Velcro – A vampire who serves as the team pilot. In this continuity, Valcro's vampiric abilities come from a modified version of the Man-Bat Serum.
- Warren Griffith – A werewolf who serves as the soldier.
- Khalis – A mummy who serves as the team medic. His origin and abilities are classified/unknown.
- Matthew Shrieve – A former POW with ties to the Commandos and Robotman during World War II.

== Other versions ==
An alternate universe iteration of the Creature Commandos appear in Flashpoint: Frankenstein and the Creatures of the Unknown, consisting of Frankenstein, Lt. Matthew Shrieve, Nina Mazursky, Sgt. Vincent Velcoro, and Warren Griffith. This version of the group was inspired by a Romanian village of peaceful monsters that Professor Myron Mazursky had encountered. Following the end of WWII, Project M was shut down by Robert Crane while the Creature Commandos were captured and placed in stasis. In the intervening years, Matthew recruited Solomon Grundy, Man-Bat, and Doctor Phosphorus to form a new iteration of the Creature Commandos, only for them to betray and kill him on General Sam Lane's orders. In the present, the original Commandos escape, only to be hunted by Miranda, Matthew's granddaughter who blames monsters for ruining her life. Nonetheless, they head to Gotham City to find Myron, only to learn he had moved to Romania before they are ambushed by Miranda, G.I. Robot, and a platoon of soldiers. However, the Commandos are saved by the Bride. Taking Miranda captive, the Bride reveals the truth behind Matthew's death while the original Commandos travel to Romania, where they find the village of monsters before it is attacked by a giant G.I. Robot. While Frankenstein and the Bride fight it, the others find Myron. He explains that when Project M was shut down, he returned to the village to find eternal life. Frankenstein and the Bride eventually defeat the G.I. Robot, though Velcoro dies during the sunrise. After Griffith is mortally wounded by a silver bullet, Myron reverses the process that transformed him, returning him to his human form. Griffith stays behind with Nina while Frankenstein, the Bride, and Miranda leave to participate in the Atlantean/Amazon war.

== Collected editions ==
The original team's adventures have been collected in the following trade paperback:

Title	Material collected	Publication date	ISBNT
The Creature Commandos	Weird War Tales #93, 97, 100, 102, 105, 108-112, 114-119, 121 and 124	2014	978-1401243821

== In other media ==
=== Television ===
- The Creature Commandos appear in the Batman: The Brave and the Bold short "The Creature Commandos in The War That Time Forgot!", consisting of Lt. Matthew Shrieve, Pvt. Warren Griffith, Sgt. Vincent Velcro, Pvt. Elliot "Lucky" Taylor, and Dr. Myrra Rhodes (voiced by Cathy Cavadini).
- The Creature Commandos appear in a self-titled segment of DC Nation Shorts, consisting of Lt. Matthew Shrieve, Pvt. Warren Griffith, Sgt. Vincent Velcoro, Pvt. Elliot "Lucky" Taylor, and Dr. Myrra Rhodes (voiced by Rachel Ramras).
- The Creature Commandos appear in a self-titled animated series, initially led by Gen. Rick Flag Sr. before being replaced by the Bride, and consisting of Nina Mazursky, G.I. Robot, Doctor Phosphorus, and Weasel. This version of the team, also known as "Task Force M", consists of monstrous inmates of Belle Reve Penitentiary's Non-Human Internment Division. In the first season finale, Nina is killed and Nosferata, Khalis, and King Shark are recruited into the team.

=== Film ===
The Creature Commandos appear in DC Showcase: Sgt. Rock, consisting of Lt. Matthew Shrieve, Pvt. Warren Griffith, Sgt. Vincent Velcro, and Pvt. Elliot "Lucky" Taylor.

== See also ==
- Nick Fury's Howling Commandos, a similar team from Marvel Comics
- The Bureau of Paranormal Research and Defense, a team of fantastic creatures featured in magazines published by Dark Horse Comics
- The Perhapanauts, a team of monster hunters that includes Bigfoot and the Chupacabra that appears in Image Comics
- Proof, a government-run team of monster hunters, including Proof the Sasquatch
