= Easy Company (comics) =

Fictional DC comics series

Publication information
- Publisher: DC Comics
- First appearance: Our Army at War #81 (April 1959)
- Created by: Bob Haney (writer); Ross Andru (artist)

In-story information
- Type of organization: Military unit
- Leader(s): Sergeant Frank Rock
- Agent(s): Bulldozer; Bogman; Canary; Four Eyes; Hot-Head; Ice Cream Soldier; Jackie Johnson; Little Sure Shot; Long Round; Short Round; Wildman; Worry Wart; Zack

Easy Company is a fictional comic book World War II US Army infantry unit led by Sgt. Rock in stories published by DC Comics. The group first appeared in Our Army at War #81 (April 1959), and were created by Bob Haney and Ross Andru.

== Publication history ==
In the stories, the unit saw action in every combat zone in the European Theatre. The unit has at least one African-American member, which would have been unusual at the time given that Army units were generally racially segregated at the time.

In the graphic novel Between Hell and a Hard Place, Sgt. Rock explained that he gave nicknames to Easy Company men because during battle, they would be required to do things their civilian identities might not be able to live with; once the war was over, the nicknames could be left behind once the soldiers resumed their civilian lives. This accounts for the proliferation of unusual character names in Easy Company over the years.

The characters of Sergeant Rock and Easy Company appeared in new monthly stories published in Our Army at War (title changed to Sgt. Rock in March 1977) until Sgt. Rock #422 (July 1988). While no longer appearing in a monthly book, Easy Company appear from time to time in World War II stories in other DC publications, including comic book miniseries Between Hell and a Hard Place (2003), The Prophecy (2005), and The Lost Battalion (2008–2009).

== "The Combat-Happy Joes" ==
Core members of Easy Company included:

- The Skipper - Easy was always commanded by an officer, usually referred to by Rock as "the skipper" and holding the rank of captain or lieutenant. At least one company commander, a "retread", was shown in the rank of major.
- Sergeant Frank Rock - The "topkick" or senior NCO of "Easy Company", with the Rank of "Master Sergeant". Rock was a steelworker from Pennsylvania who enlisted in the U.S. Army the day after the attack on Pearl Harbor. He was later promoted to sergeant after the Battle of Three Stripe Hill, in which he held off a German attack single-handed after they killed everyone else in his unit, earning him the nickname "the Rock of Easy Company". He was usually depicted carrying a belt of .50-caliber bullets over his shoulders despite the company's lack of heavy machine guns. Rock supposedly died "from the last bullet fired in the last battle on the last day" of World War II, but retconned continuities have him survive the war to later become a General.
- Bulldozer - Rock's second-in-command, holding the rank of Corporal. He is notably large and strong man. Real name: Horace Eustace Canfield, Bulldozer is usually seen using a machinegun or an automatic rifle. Note: an earlier character named Sergeant Nichols first had the nickname "Bulldozer."
- Wildman - A history professor from Colorado before the war, noted for his bright red full beard. His nickname derives from turning into a "Wildman" when engaged in battle. His real name is Harold Shapiro, though some sources list his first name as Joseph.
- Jackie Johnson - An African-American trooper and ex-heavyweight boxing champion, whose character was an amalgamation of Jackie Robinson and Joe Louis. He is notable as one of the first non-stereotypical African-American characters in comics.
- Little Sure Shot - An Apache sniper who always decorates his helmet with feathers. Real name: Louis Kiyahani.
- Ice Cream Soldier - A small soldier whose nickname derives in part from being at his best in combat during cold weather, and in always being "cool in combat". Real name: Phil Mason. In stories post-2000, his nickname is further shortened to "Ice".
- Four Eyes - A bespectacled soldier and, ironically, one of Easy's best sharpshooters.
- Zack Nolan - Easy's original bazooka man. He lost one arm in combat, but returned for a final mission. Some sources list his surname as Taylor.
- Long Round and Short Round - Zack's replacements on the bazooka, always working as a team.
- Canary - A soldier known for always whistling in any circumstances not requiring silence.
- Worry Wart - A solid soldier, constantly worrying about whether his number was almost up.
- Farmer Boy - He refused to let the war stop him from doing what he was born to do.
- Junior - He lied about his age to enlist in the Army. Real name: William West.
- Sunny - He earned the nickname "Sunny" because he was always smiling. Real name: Samuel S. Gordon.
- Tag-a-Long - He got the nickname "Tag-a-Long" due to his shadowing Sgt. Rock's every move, including following Rock into dangerous solo missions. Real name: Thomas.
- Wee Willie - He was called Wee Willie because of his small size.
- Tin Soldier - He was an actor who became a soldier. Real name: Randy Booth.

This does not include anonymous replacements and one-time characters who are frequently killed off in the stories. Easy Company's lieutenants, when they appear at all, are frequently killed off within the first few pages. Letters columns in the 1980s included a roster of all characters introduced into the series; several dozen character names were listed, including some anonymous soldiers.

== In other media ==
- The Easy Company appear in the Justice League three-part episode "The Savage Time", consisting of Sgt. Rock (voiced by Fred Dryer), Bulldozer (voiced by Ted Levine), Wildman, and Ice Cream Soldier. Additionally, they are briefly joined by a temporarily depowered, time-traveling Green Lantern. The Easy Company join forces with the U.S. Armed Forces, Steve Trevor, the Blackhawks, and the time-traveling Justice League to foil Vandal Savage's plot to help Nazi Germany win World War II and eventually conquer the world.
- The Easy Company appear in flashbacks in the Creature Commandos episode "Cheers to the Tin Man", consisting of Sgt. Rock (voiced by Maury Sterling), Little Sure Shot (Robbie Daymond), Bulldozer (Paul Ben-Victor), G.I. Robot (Sean Gunn), Wildman, Four Eyes, and Canary.
