= Batman in popular culture =

The DC Comics character Batman has become a popular culture icon, recognized around the world. The character's presence has extended beyond his comic book origins; events such as the release of the 1989 Batman film and its accompanying merchandising "brought the Batman to the forefront of public consciousness". In an article commemorating the sixtieth anniversary of the character, The Guardian wrote, "Batman is a figure blurred by the endless reinvention that is modern mass culture. He is at once an icon and a commodity: the perfect cultural artefact for the 21st century."

In September 2024, Batman became the first superhero to be given a star on the Hollywood Walk of Fame.

== In other media ==
The character of Batman has appeared in various media aside from comic books, such as newspaper syndicated comic strips, books, radio dramas, television, a stage show, and several theatrical feature films. The first adaptation of Batman was as a daily newspaper comic strip which premiered on October 25, 1943. That same year the character was adapted in the 15-part serial Batman, with Lewis Wilson becoming the first actor to portray Batman on screen. While Batman never had a radio series of his own, the character made occasional guest appearances in The Adventures of Superman, starting in 1945 on occasions when Superman voice actor Bud Collyer needed time off. A second movie serial, Batman and Robin, followed in 1949, with Robert Lowery taking over the role of Batman. The exposure provided by these adaptations during the 1940s "helped make [Batman] a household name for millions who never bought a comic book".

In the 1964 publication of Donald Barthelme's collection of short stories Come Back, Dr. Caligari, Barthelme wrote "The Joker's Greatest Triumph". Batman is portrayed for purposes of spoof as a pretentious French-speaking rich man.

== Television ==
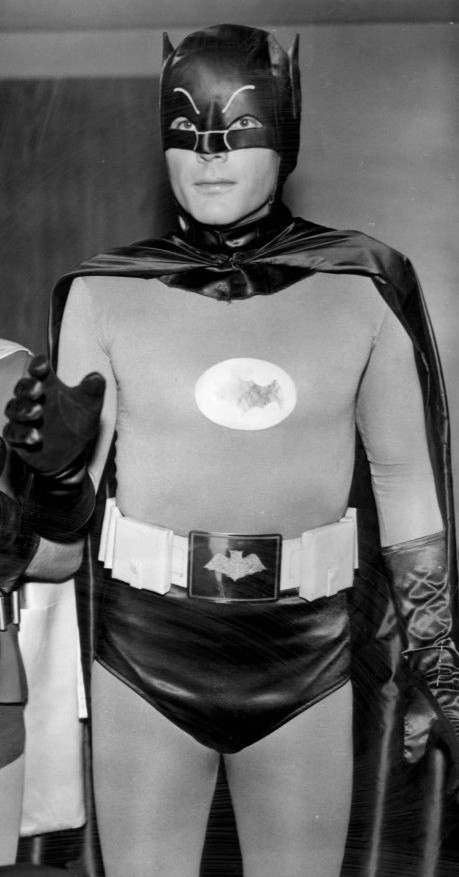
Adam West as Batman in the 1960s TV series.

The Batman television series, starring Adam West, premiered in January 1966 on the ABC television network. Inflected with a camp sense of humor, the show became a pop culture phenomenon. In his memoir, Back to the Batcave, West notes his dislike for the term 'camp' as it was applied to the 1960s series, opining that the show was instead a farce or lampoon, and a deliberate one, at that. The series ran for 120 episodes, ending in 1968. In between the first and second season of the Batman television series, the cast and crew made the theatrical film Batman (1966). The Who recorded the theme song from the Batman show for their 1966 EP Ready Steady Who, and the Kinks performed the theme song on their 1967 album Live at Kelvin Hall. Adam West also appeared in character as Batman in several commercials and a 1966 US Government PSA for Savings Bonds. Despite not having an immediate continuation, the series spawned a (failed) pilot episode for a spin-off Batgirl television series and, decades later, the Batman '66 (2013–2016) comic book series, the animated films Batman: Return of the Caped Crusaders (2016) and Batman vs. Two-Face (2017), and even the mockumentary Return to the Batcave: The Misadventures of Adam and Burt (2003).

In the 1996 episode Heroes and Villains of Only Fools and Horses, David Jason spoofed the role of Batman.

The popularity of the Batman TV series also resulted in the first animated adaptation of Batman in The Batman/Superman Hour; the Batman segments of the series were repackaged as The Adventures of Batman and Batman with Robin the Boy Wonder which produced thirty-three episodes between 1968 and 1977. From 1973 until 1986, Batman had a starring role in ABC's Super Friends series, which was animated by Hanna-Barbera. Olan Soule was the voice of Batman in all these shows, but was eventually replaced during Super Friends by Adam West, who also voiced the character in Filmation's 1977 series The New Adventures of Batman.

In 1992, Batman: The Animated Series premiered on the Fox television network, produced by Warner Bros. Animation and featuring Kevin Conroy as the voice of Batman. The series received considerable acclaim for its darker tone, mature writing, stylistic design, and thematic complexity compared to previous superhero cartoons, in addition to multiple Emmy Awards. The series' success led to the theatrical film Batman: Mask of the Phantasm (1993), as well as various spin-off TV series that included Superman: The Animated Series, The New Batman Adventures, Justice League and Justice League Unlimited (each of which also featured Conroy as Batman's voice). The futuristic series Batman Beyond also took place in this same animated continuity and featured a newer, younger Batman voiced by Will Friedle, with the elderly Bruce Wayne (again voiced by Conroy) as a mentor.

In 2004, an unrelated animated series titled The Batman made its debut with Rino Romano voicing Batman. In 2008, this show was replaced by another animated series, Batman: The Brave and the Bold, featuring Diedrich Bader's voice as Batman. In 2013, a new animated series titled Beware the Batman made its debut, with Anthony Ruivivar voicing Batman.

In 2014, the live-action TV series Gotham premiered on the Fox network, featuring David Mazouz as a 12-year-old Bruce Wayne. In 2018, when the series was renewed for its fifth and final season it was announced that Batman would make an appearance in the series finale's flash-forward.

Iain Glen portrays Bruce Wayne in the live-action series Titans, appearing in the show's second season in 2019. Prior to Glen, Batman was played by stunt doubles Alain Moussi and Maxim Savarias in the first season.

To commemorate the 75th anniversary of the character, Warner Bros aired the television short film, Batman: Strange Days, that was also posted on DC's YouTube channel.

In August 2019, it was announced that Kevin Conroy would make his live-action television debut as an older Bruce Wayne in the upcoming Arrowverse crossover, Crisis on Infinite Earths. In the crossover, he portrayed a parallel universe iteration of Batman from Earth-99. In Batwoman, the Earth-Prime version of Bruce Wayne / Batman is portrayed by Warren Christie.

A new animated series titled Batman: Caped Crusader was released on Amazon Prime Video on August 1, 2024 by Bruce Timm (co-creator of Batman: The Animated Series), JJ Abrams, and Matt Reeves. The series is a reimagining of the Caped Crusader that returns to the character's noir roots with Hamish Linklater voicing Bruce Wayne / Batman.

== Film ==
As previously stated, Batman's first cinematic appearances consisted of the 1943 serial film Batman and its 1949 sequel Batman and Robin, which were both released by Columbia Pictures and depicted a government-backed version of Batman and Robin (censorship at the time would not have allowed for vigilantes to be depicted as unauthorized crimefighters). The serials (especially the first one) are, though, notorious for their accentuation on anti-Japanese sentiments due to their World War II-period setting. In 1966, 20th Century Fox released Batman's first feature-length film, titled Batman (also advertised as Batman: The Movie), based on and featuring most of the cast from the 1960s TV series.

=== Burton/Schumacher series ===
In 1989, Warner Bros. released the feature film Batman, directed by Tim Burton and starring Michael Keaton as the title character. The film was a huge success; not only was it the top-grossing film of the year, but at the time was the fifth highest-grossing film in history. The film also won the Academy Award for Best Art Direction. The film's success spawned three sequels: Batman Returns (1992), Batman Forever (1995) and Batman & Robin (1997), the latter two of which were directed by Joel Schumacher instead of Burton, and replaced Keaton as Batman with Val Kilmer and George Clooney, respectively. The second Schumacher film failed to outgross any of its predecessors and was critically panned, causing Warner Bros. to cancel the planned fourth sequel, Batman Unchained, and end the initial film series. The first two films later became the basis for the Burton-inspired comic book series Batman '89 (2021). Keaton would later reprise his role as Bruce Wayne / Batman for the 2023 film, The Flash.

=== The Dark Knight Trilogy ===
In 2005, Batman Begins was released by Warner Bros. as a reboot of the film series, directed by Christopher Nolan and starring Christian Bale as Batman. Its sequel, The Dark Knight (2008), set the record for the highest grossing opening weekend of all time in the U.S., earning approximately $158 million, and became the fastest film to reach the $400 million mark in the history of American cinema (eighteenth day of release). These record-breaking attendances saw The Dark Knight end its run as the second-highest domestic grossing film (at the time) with $533 million, bested then only by Titanic. The film also won two Academy Awards, including Best Supporting Actor for Heath Ledger's portrayal of the Joker. It was eventually followed by The Dark Knight Rises (2012), which served as a conclusion to Nolan's film series that has since been known as The Dark Knight Trilogy.

=== Animated films ===
Since 2008, Batman has also starred in various direct-to-video films under the DC Universe Animated Original Movies label. Kevin Conroy reprised his voice role of Batman for several of these films while others have featured celebrity voice actors in the role, including Jeremy Sisto, William Baldwin, Bruce Greenwood, Ben McKenzie, Peter Weller, and Jensen Ackles. In the direct-to-video films of the DC Animated Movie Universe, Batman was voiced by Kevin Conroy again in Justice League: The Flashpoint Paradox (2013) and by Jason O'Mara in all subsequent films, such as The Death of Superman (2018) and Batman: Hush (2019). A Lego-themed version of Batman was also featured as one of the protagonists in the theatrically released animated film The Lego Movie (2014), with Will Arnett providing the voice. Arnett reprised the voice role for the spin-off film The Lego Batman Movie (2017), as well as for the sequel The Lego Movie 2: The Second Part (2019). Keanu Reeves voiced Batman in the animated film DC League of Super-Pets (2022).

=== DC Extended Universe ===
In 2016, Ben Affleck began portraying Batman in the DC Extended Universe with the release of the film Batman v Superman: Dawn of Justice, directed by Zack Snyder, a younger child version of the character was played by Brandon Spink in the same film. Affleck also made a cameo appearance as Batman in David Ayer's film Suicide Squad (2016). Affleck reprised the role in the 2017 film Justice League, also set in the DC Extended Universe, as well as the director's cut, Zack Snyder's Justice League. Affleck reprised his role in the 2023 film, The Flash, also set in the DC Extended Universe. This is expected to be Affleck's last appearance in the role.

=== DC Elseworlds films ===
Dante Pereira-Olson portrays a young Bruce Wayne in the 2019 film Joker.

=== Batman Epic Crime Saga ===
Robert Pattinson portrays Bruce Wayne / Batman in the 2022 film, The Batman, directed by Matt Reeves.

=== DC Universe ===
A new iteration of Batman is set to appear in the DC Universe (DCU) franchise, beginning with the film The Brave and the Bold, produced by DC Studios. The film will focus on Batman and Damian Wayne. The film will be directed by The Flash director Andy Muschietti and produced by James Gunn, Peter Safran and Barbara Muschietti.

== Fine art ==
Starting with the Pop Art period, and on a continuing basis, since the 1960s, the character of Batman has been "appropriated" by multiple visual artists and incorporated into contemporary artwork, most notably by Andy Warhol, Roy Lichtenstein, Mel Ramos, Dulce Pinzon, Mr. Brainwash, Raymond Pettibon, Peter Saul, and others.

== Video games ==
Since 1986, Batman has starred in multiple video games, most of which were adaptations of the various cinematic or animated incarnations of the character. Among the most successful of these games is the Batman: Arkham series. The first installment, Batman: Arkham Asylum (2009), was released by Rocksteady Studios to critical acclaim; review aggregator Metacritic reports it as having received 92% positive reviews. It was followed by the sequel Batman: Arkham City (2011), which also received widespread acclaim and holds a Metacritic ranking of 94%. A prequel game titled Batman: Arkham Origins (2013) was later released by WB Games Montréal. A fourth game titled Batman: Arkham Knight (2015) has also been released by Rocksteady. As with most animated Batman media, Kevin Conroy provided the voice of the character for these games, with the exception of Arkham Origins in which the younger Batman is voiced by Roger Craig Smith. In 2016, Telltale Games released Batman: The Telltale Series adventure game, which changed the Wayne family's history as it is depicted in the Batman mythos. A sequel, titled Batman: The Enemy Within, was released in 2017.

=== Role-playing games ===
Mayfair Games published the DC Heroes role-playing game in 1985, then published the 80-page supplement Batman the following year, written by Mike Stackpole, with cover art by Ed Hannigan. In 1989, Mayfair Games published an updated 96-page softcover Batman Sourcebook, again written by Mike Stackpole, with additional material by J. Santana, Louis Prosperi, Jack Barker and Ray Winninger, with graphic design by Gregory Scott, and cover and interior art by DC Comics staff.

Mayfair released a simplified version of DC Heroes called The Batman Role-Playing Game in 1989 to coincide with the Batman film.

== Literary interpretations ==
=== Psychological interpretation ===
Batman has been the subject of psychological study for some time, and there have been a number of interpretations into the character's psyche. In Batman and Psychology: A Dark and Stormy Knight, Dr. Travis Langley argues that the concept of archetypes as described by psychologists Carl Jung and Joseph Campbell is present in the Batman mythos, such that the character represents the "shadow archetype". This archetype, according to Langley, represents a person's own dark side; it is not necessarily an evil one, but rather one that is hidden from the outside and concealed from both the world and oneself. Langley argues that Bruce Wayne confronts his own darkness early in life; he chooses to use it to instill fear in wrongdoers, with his bright and dark sides working together to fight evil. Langley uses the Jungian perspective to assert that Batman appeals to our own need to face our "shadow selves". Langley also taught a class called Batman, a title he was adamant about. "I could have called it something like the Psychology of Nocturnal Vigilantism, but no. I called it Batman," Langley says.

Several psychologists have explored Bruce Wayne/Batman's mental health. Robin. S. Rosenberg evaluated his actions and problems to determine if they reach the level of mental disorders. She examined the possibility of several mental health issues, including dissociative identity disorder, obsessive–compulsive disorder, and several others. She concluded that Bruce Wayne/Batman may have a disorder or a combination of disorders but due to his fictional nature, a definitive diagnosis will remain unknown. However, Langley himself states in his book that Batman is far too functional and well-adjusted, due to his training, confrontation of his fear early on and other factors, to be mentally ill. More likely, he asserts Batman's mental attitude is far more in line with a dedicated Olympic athlete.

=== Gay interpretation ===
Gay interpretations of the character have been part of the academic study of Batman since psychologist Fredric Wertham asserted in Seduction of the Innocent in 1954 that "Batman stories are psychologically homosexual ...The Batman type of story may stimulate children to homosexual fantasies, of the nature of which they may be unconscious." Andy Medhurst wrote in his 1991 essay "Batman, Deviance, and Camp" that Batman is interesting to gay audiences because "he was one of the first fictional characters to be attacked on the grounds of his presumed homosexuality". Professor of film and cultural studies Will Brooker argues the validity of a queer reading of Batman, and that gay readers would naturally find themselves drawn to the lifestyle depicted within, whether the character of Bruce Wayne himself were explicitly gay or not. He also identifies a homophobic element to the vigor with which mainstream fandom rejects the possibility of a gay reading of the character. In 2005, painter Mark Chamberlain displayed a number of watercolors depicting both Batman and Robin in suggestive and sexually explicit poses, prompting DC to threaten legal action.

Creators associated with the character have expressed their own opinions. Writer Alan Grant has stated, "The Batman I wrote for 13 years isn't gay ...everybody's Batman all the way back to Bob Kane ...none of them wrote him as a gay character. Only Joel Schumacher might have had an opposing view." Frank Miller views the character as sublimating his sexual urges into crimefighting so much so that he is "borderline pathological", concluding "He'd be much healthier if he were gay." Grant Morrison said that "Gayness is built into Batman ...Obviously as a fictional character he's intended to be heterosexual, but the basis of the whole concept is utterly gay."

== Sources ==
- Boichel, Bill (1991). "Batman: Commodity as Myth". The Many Lives of the Batman: Critical Approaches to a Superhero and His Media. London: Routledge. ISBN 978-0-85170-276-6.
- Daniels, Les (1999). Batman: The Complete History. Chronicle Books. ISBN 978-0-8118-2470-5.
- Pearson, Roberta E.; Uricchio, William, eds. (1991). The Many Lives of the Batman: Critical Approaches to a Superhero and His Media. London: Routledge. ISBN 978-0-85170-276-6.
