= Doctor Phosphorus =

DC Comics supervillain

- Doctor Phosphorus as depicted in Batman: Eternal #6 (May 2014). Art by Trevor McCarthy.

Publication information
- Publisher: DC Comics
- First appearance: Detective Comics #469 (May 1977)
- Created by: Steve Englehart; Walt Simonson

In-story information
- Alter ego: Alexander James Sartorius
- Species: Metahuman
- Team affiliations: Secret Society of Super Villains
- Abilities: Thermokinesis; Radiation manipulation; Superhuman endurance

Doctor Phosphorus (Alexander James Sartorius) is a supervillain who appears in American comic book published by DC Comics. Primarily an enemy of Batman, the villain exists in DC's main shared universe, known as the DC Universe.

Doctor Phosphorus appears in the DC Universe series Creature Commandos, voiced by Alan Tudyk.

== Publication history ==
Doctor Phosphorus first appeared in Detective Comics #469 (May 1977), and was created by writer Steve Englehart and artist Walt Simonson.

== Fictional character biography ==
Dr. Alex Sartorius was a member of the Tobacconists' Club who intended to build a nuclear power plant in Gotham City with help from the Club's chairman, Rupert Thorne. However, the people of Gotham refused the construction of the plant and he was forced to take the project far from the city. Eventually, Sartorius was transformed by sand irradiated during the nuclear plant's meltdown, driven up one element on the chemical table, from silicon to phosphorus. His body was changed as his skin would burn at any contact and his skeleton showed through his flesh similar to x-ray. For his mutation, he swore to make Gotham pay by poisoning the water supply. This plan is foiled by Batman, but Phosphorus escapes and contacts Thorne to eliminate Batman. Batman continues his search for Phosphorus and they eventually clash in the nuclear power plant. Phosphorus falls into the nuclear reactor and is presumed dead in the resulting explosion.

During the Underworld Unleashed storyline, Phosphorus sells his soul to the demon Neron to gain increased control over his powers. He becomes able to wear normal clothing without it bursting into flame.

In the series Starman, Phosphorus is hired by Mist to kill the original Starman, Ted Knight, but is defeated by the retired hero. They face each other a second time; this time, Phosphorus has given Knight a significant dose of radiation, which gave him terminal disease. In a third and final confrontation, Knight is determined to ensure that Phosphorus would harm no one else. During the battle, he uses his cosmic rod to tear the pavement from beneath Phosphorus and drive him into the earth, apparently killing him.

Phosphorus returns in Detective Comics #825, where he is being held in Cadmus Research laboratories. Cadmus scientists discover that he is no longer human and has had his organs replaced by energy. He eventually escapes, but is defeated by Batman and imprisoned in Arkham Asylum.

During Batman's absence after his presumed death, Phosphorus escapes custody and kidnaps Kirk Langstrom and his wife Francine for information about their research. However, Kirk stops him after transforming into Man-Bat.

In 2011, The New 52 rebooted the DC Comics universe. In this new continuity, Phosphorus appears as a member of the Secret Society of Super Villains.

== Powers and abilities ==
Doctor Phosphorus has the ability to manipulate radiation for various effects, such as burning skin and toxic fume emissions. His body's major organs are not present, but he produces an endless source of energy for himself. When he sold his soul to Neron, Sartorius was granted greater powers, as well as temperature control.

== Other versions ==
An alternate universe version of Doctor Phosphorus appears in Flashpoint. This version is a member of the Creature Commandos.

== In other media ==
=== Television ===
- Doctor Phosphorus was used as inspiration for The Batman's incarnation of Firefly (voiced by Jason Marsden). In the episode "White Heat", Firefly and his girlfriend, Dr. Jane Blazedale attempts to steal a phosphorus isotope so he can upgrade his arsenal. However, an accident occurs that turns Firefly into Phosphorus, granting him fiery skin and a burning touch.
- Alexander "Alex" Sartorius / Doctor Phosphorus appears in Creature Commandos, voiced by Alan Tudyk. This version is an inmate of Belle Reve Penitentiary, former scientist turned crime boss, widower to an immigrant woman named Parvin, and member of the eponymous group. In flashbacks, Alex sought out industrialist and crime lord Rupert Thorne's help in funding research to cure cancer via nuclear fusion while secretly giving Thorne falsified data due to Thorne's involvement with the country Bialya. Upon discovering this, Thorne had Parvin and the Sartoriuses' son killed, framed Alex for it, and attempted to kill him with his nuclear equipment. Following his transformation, Alex went insane, killed Thorne, his family and his men, and took over his criminal empire until he was defeated by Batman and sent to Belle Reve.

=== Film ===
Doctor Phosphorus appears in The Lego Batman Movie.

=== Video games ===
- Doctor Phosphorus appears as a character summon in Scribblenauts Unmasked: A DC Comics Adventure.
- Dr. Alex Sartorius appears in Batman: Arkham Knight via Simon Stagg's audiotapes. This version was raised as a Catholic, but chose science over faith and became an employee at Stagg Industries. He later discovers that Stagg is collaborating with the Scarecrow to develop the Cloudburst technology and is exposed to the latter's fear toxin, causing him to develop pyrophobia.

=== Miscellaneous ===
- Doctor Phosphorus appears in Smallville Season 11: Titans.
- Doctor Phosphorus appears as part of the Lego minifigure series for the Batman Movie Series 2.

== See also ==
- List of Batman family enemies
