= Masur, Iran =

Masur ماسور
- Village
- Location within Iran
- Coordinates: 33°26′19″N 48°19′17″E
- Country: Iran
- Province: Lorestan
- County: Khorramabad
- Bakhsh: Central
- Rural District: Koregah-e Gharbi

Population (2006)
  - Total: 15,037
- Time zone: UTC+3:30 (IRST)
  - Summer (DST): UTC+4:30 (IRDT)

Masur (Persian: ماسور, also Romanized as Māsūr; also known as Qal‘eh Mansūr) is a village in Koregah-e Gharbi Rural District, in the Central District of Khorramabad County, Lorestan Province, Iran. At the 2006 census, its population was 15,037, in 3,093 families.
