= Daniela Melchior =

Portuguese actress (born 1996)

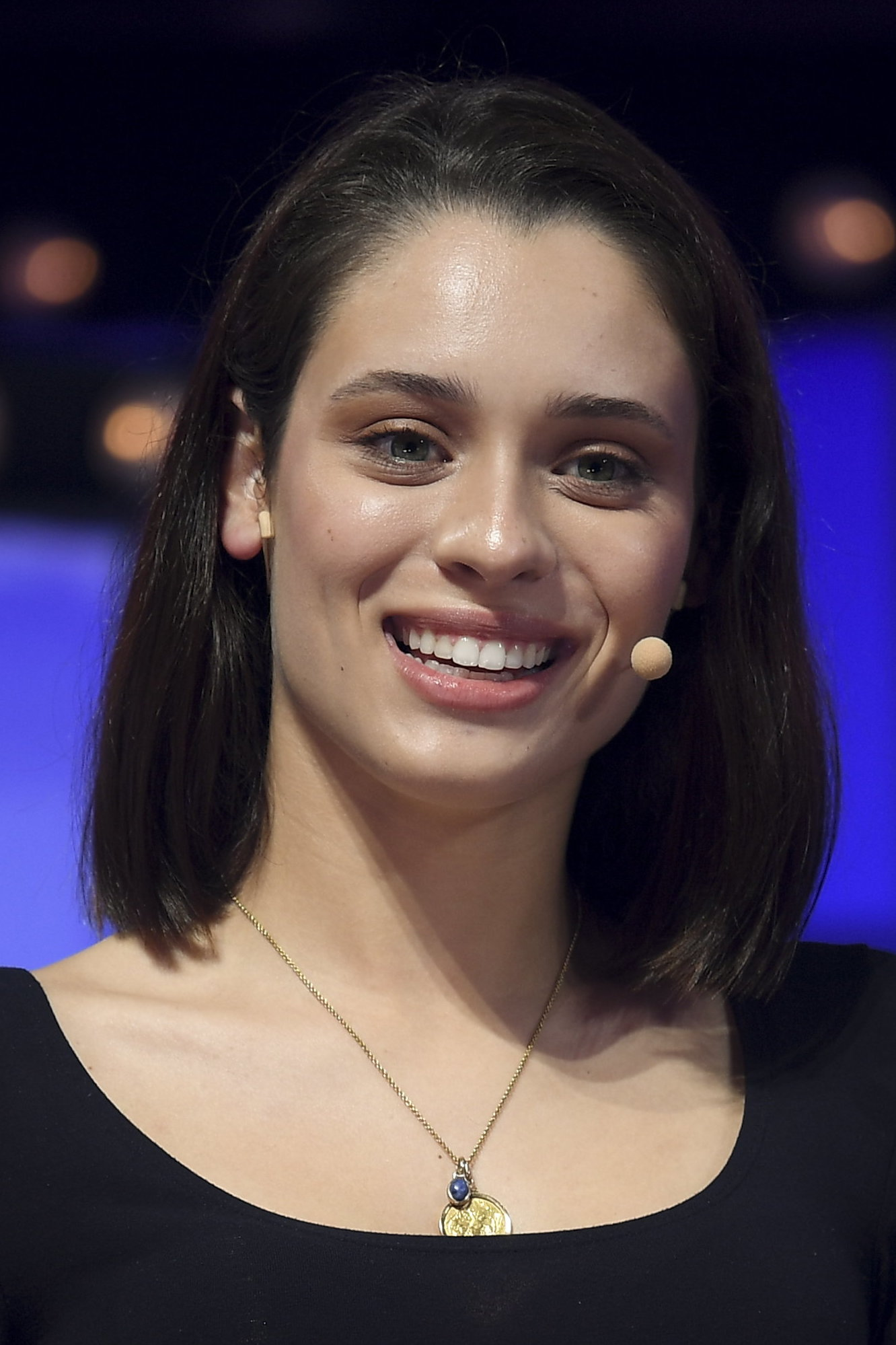
- Melchior at the Web Summit, Lisbon in 2021
- Born: Daniela Melchior dos Reis Lopes Pereira; 1 November 1996 (age 29); Almada, Portugal
- Occupation: Actress
- Years active: 2014–present
- Notable work: The Suicide Squad, Fast X and Guardians of the Galaxy Vol. 3
- Height: 170 cm (5 ft 7 in)

Daniela Melchior dos Reis Lopes Pereira (European Portuguese: [dɐniˈɛlɐ mɛlʃiˈɔɾ]; born 1 November 1996) is a Portuguese actress. She started her career in 2014 with a recurring role in telenovela Mulheres, followed by the teen drama Massa Fresca (2016). In 2017, she was cast in a leading role in the award-winning telenovela Ouro Verde. She appeared in other telenovelas, such as A Herdeira (2018), Valor da Vida (2018) and Pecado (2021) Melchior made her film debut in 2018 with The Black Book. She provided the Portuguese dubbing for Gwen Stacy in Spider-Man: Into the Spider-Verse and was cast in the comedy drama Parque Mayer in the same year. Her performance in the latter earned her a nomination for the Sophia Award Best Actress.

Melchior's first international casting was as Cleo Cazo in the DCEU film The Suicide Squad (2021), which earned her a nomination for Best Newcomer at the Portuguese Golden Globes. Subsequently, she took on minor and supporting roles in English-language films, including Marlowe (2022), Assassin Club (2023), Guardians of the Galaxy Vol. 3 (2023), Fast X (2023), Road House (2024), American Sweatshop (2025) and Anaconda (2025). In 2024, she joined the cast of Balls Up, and in 2025 of Violent Night 2.

== Early life ==
Daniela Melchior dos Reis Lopes Pereira was born on 1 November 1996 in Almada, Portugal. From a young age, she showed a strong interest in acting, aspiring to become a film star. She attended a convent school and later did a vocational course in performing arts in high school. During her school years, she participated in local and school theatre productions. At 16, she joined a modelling agency as a way to gain access to the acting industry, appearing in small commercials before eventually landing her first television role.

== Career ==
=== 2014–2021: Portuguese film and television ===
Melchior started her career in 2014 with the role in telenovela Mulheres, where she starred for 316 episodes and, subsequently, in 68 episodes of teen drama Massa Fresca (2016). Her breakthrough came with her first leading role as Cláudia Andrade for 221 episodes of the award-winning (Note: won the 46th International Emmy Awards for Best Telenovela) Portuguese telenovela Ouro Verde (2017), establishing her as one of Portugal's most promising young actresses. She also participated in other Portuguese film and television productions, such as telenovelas A Herdeira (2018), Valor da Vida (2018) and Pecado (2021) and feature-length films The Black Book (2018) and comedy drama Parque Mayer (2018). Her performance in Mayer earned her a Sophia Awards nomination for Best Actress. After a representative from the United States saw the trailer for Mayer, they offered to represent her, prompting her eventual move to pursue roles abroad. She also provided the Portuguese voice for Gwen Stacy in Spider-Man: Into the Spider-Verse, earning recognition among the comic book fan community in Brazil.

=== 2021–present: Hollywood work ===
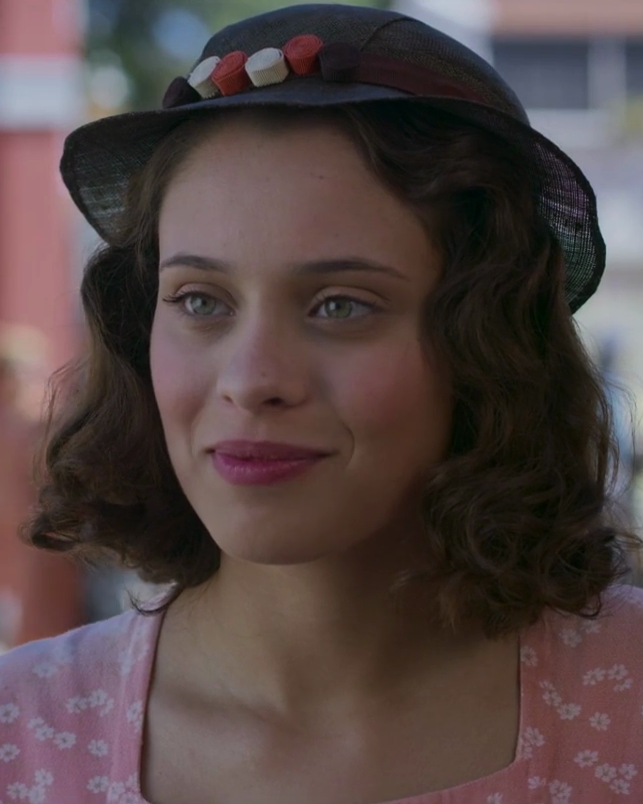
Daniela Melchior in Parque Mayer as Deolinda

In 2019, James Gunn cast Daniela Melchior as Cleo Cazo, also known as Ratcatcher 2, for his film The Suicide Squad (2021). Melchior was encouraged to present herself in a traditionally glamorous manner for her initial pre-audition meeting, but this approach reportedly did not align with the vision of the film's producers. For her subsequent audition, Melchior adopted a darker, more eccentric portrayal of the character, which resonated with Gunn and ultimately led to her casting. She also had a further audition with rats. Melchior as Cleo Cazo marked the first portrayal by a Portuguese actress in a DC Extended Universe film. Gunn described Melchior as "the heart of the film." Critics identified Melchior as the film's standout, describing her as "luminous", "wonderfully guileless", and "the film's secret weapon."

In 2021, Melchior was cast in the crime thriller Marlowe and action thriller Assassin Club. In March 2022, she joined the cast of the tenth Fast & Furious film titled, Fast X, with Vin Diesel offering her the role after seeing her performance in The Suicide Squad. In June 2022, it was announced that she would collaborate for the second time with James Gunn in his MCU film Guardians of the Galaxy Vol. 3, making her the first Portuguese actress to appear in an MCU film. Gunn is reported to have written the character, Ura, specifically for Melchior. In August 2022, she joined the action film Road House, a remake of the 1989 film. In 2024, she joined the cast of action comedy Balls Up, directed by Peter Farrelly. In August 2025, she starred in the mystery thriller American Sweatshop; with critics saying that Melchior was underused in the movie. In October 2025, it was announced that Melchior would star in the comedy horror Anaconda, a remake of the 1997 film, and in the action comedy Violent Night 2.

In 2023, Melchior went to Paris Fashion Week as a Balmain's muse. On International Women's Day, French fashion company ba&sh invited Melchior for their new campaign.

== Activism and advocacy ==
Melchior has been involved in various activist movements, particularly those focused on anti-racism. In 2020, she participated in Blackout Tuesday, a global wave of protests after the murder of George Floyd, and took part in an anti-racism protest in Lisbon. In April 2025, Melchior was one of the public figures who criticized the launch of the all-female space crew Blue Origin's New Shepard, calling it "the opposite of women's empowerment" and a "waste of money, resources and pollution just to put a group of women in space and sell it as women's power."

== Personal life ==
Before the filming of The Suicide Squad, Melchior suffered from health issues due to the anxiety she felt working with high-profile actors on the shoot such as Margot Robbie and Idris Elba. Melchior has attention deficit hyperactivity disorder and anxiety.

== Filmography ==
=== Film ===
Key
†	Denotes films that have not yet been released

Year	Title	Role	Notes
2018	The Black Book	La Fille	
2018	Spider-Man: Into the Spider-Verse	Gwen Stacy / Spider-Woman	Portuguese dubs
2018	Parque Mayer	Deolinda	
2021	The Suicide Squad	Cleo Cazo / Ratcatcher 2	
2022	Marlowe	Lynn Peterson	
2023	Guardians of the Galaxy Vol. 3	Ura	
2023	Assassin Club	Sophie	
2023	Fast X	Isabel Neves	
2024	Road House	Ellie	
2025	American Sweatshop	Ava Lopez	
2025	Anaconda	Ana Almeida	
2026	Balls Up	Isabella Costa	
2026	Violent Night 2 †	TBA	

=== Television ===
Year	Title	Role	Notes	Ref
2014–15	Mulheres	Viviana Gomes	316 episodes	
2016	Massa Fresca	Carminho Santiago	68 episodes	
2017	Ouro Verde	Cláudia Andrade	221 episodes	
2018	A Herdeira	Ariana Franco	190 episodes	
2018–19	Valor da Vida	Isabel Vasconcellos	203 episodes	
2021	Pecado	Maria Manuela	6 episodes	

== Awards and nominations ==
Year	Award	Category	Nominated work	Result	Ref
2019	Sophia Awards	Best Actress	Parque Mayer	Nominated	
2019	CinEuphoria Awards	Best Actress - National Competition	Parque Mayer	Nominated	
2019	CinEuphoria Awards	Best Ensemble - National Competition	Parque Mayer	Nominated	
2021	Portuguese Golden Globes	Best Newcomer	The Suicide Squad	Nominated	
