= Parque Mayer =

2018 Portuguese comedy drama film by António-Pedro Vasconcelos

- Film poster
- Directed by: António-Pedro Vasconcelos
- Written by: Tiago Santos
- Produced by: Tino Navarro
- Starring: Francisco Froes; Daniela Melchior
- Music by: José M. Afonso
- Production company: MGN Filmes
- Distributed by: Big Picture Films
- Release date: December 6, 2018
- Running time: 134 minutes
- Country: Portugal
- Language: Portuguese

Parque Mayer is a 2018 Portuguese comedy drama film directed by António-Pedro Vasconcelos. The film stars Francisco Froes and Daniela Melchior in the main lead roles. The film was released on 6 December 2018.

== Cast ==
- Francisco Froes as Mário Pintor
- Daniela Melchior as Deolinda
- Diogo Morgado as Eduardo Gonzaga
- Miguel Guilherme as José
- Alexandra Lencastre as Madame Calado
- Carla Maciel as Maria Gusmão
- Sérgio Praia as Augusto
