= American Sweatshop =

2025 mystery thriller film by Uta Briesewitz

- U.S release poster
- Directed by: Uta Briesewitz
- Written by: Matthew Nemeth
- Produced by: Barry Levinson; Tom Fontana
- Starring: Lili Reinhart; Daniela Melchior; Jeremy Ang Jones; Josh Whitehouse; Tim Plester; Christiane Paul; Joel Fry
- Cinematography: Jörg Widmer
- Edited by: Philipp Thomas
- Production companies: Elsani Film; Baltimore Pictures; MMC Movies; RNA Pictures
- Distributed by: Plaion Pictures (Germany); Brainstorm Media (United States)
- Release dates: March 8, 2025 (SXSW); September 19, 2025 (United States)
- Running time: 93 minutes
- Countries: Germany; United States
- Language: English

American Sweatshop is a 2025 mystery thriller film directed by Uta Briesewitz and written by Matthew Nemeth. It stars Lili Reinhart as social media content moderator Daisy Morris who attempts to solve a violent crime she sees in a video while on the job. Daniela Melchior and Joel Fry act in supporting roles and the film was produced by Barry Levinson and Tom Fontana.

The film premiered at the 2025 South by Southwest Film & TV Festival in March 2025 in the Narrative Spotlight category.

== Plot ==
Daisy Morris works at Paladin as a social media content moderator. Her job is to review flagged content and, based on a stringent set of guidelines, decide if it should be removed from an unnamed platform. The office has rigid quotas, dictatorial manager Joy Jones, panic attacks and meltdowns by employees, even an alligator lurking in a man-made pond.

Daisy tries to maintain a normal routine—using sex, drugs and alcohol to numb herself, but constant exposure to disturbing imagery causes her sense of well-being to erode. She struggles to sleep, is unable to connect with peers and grows increasingly isolated and detached. She comes across a post that proves particularly damaging. The video is never shown but flashes of footage and subsequent discussions imply it contains a violent, mechanized rape. Haunted by what she's seen, Daisy grows obsessed with holding someone accountable. However, both Joy and the police dismiss her concerns, claiming the content is fake and outside their realm of concern. So she takes matters into her own hands and attempts to find the man from the video.

With little evidence and no detective skills, Daisy relies on the internet to fuel her quest, which leads to a series of dead ends and wild goose chases. Her investigation spirals into dangerous territory, forcing her to confront her own mental limits and the grisly reality of what's online. Her frustration boils over and causes her to commit an act of violence. She attacks crude bartender Gus Delong and, hands covered in blood, she's finally able to sleep through the night. Shortly after, she manages to track down the man from the video and she prepares to enact justice.

However, a video of Daisy assaulting Gus ends up flagged on social media. She realizes she has perpetuated the very thing she's trying to stop. She quits her job and starts to heal. She goes to an interview for a coveted position at a healthcare firm. In the final moments, it's revealed the person interviewing her is actually the man she's been searching for. She turns to the camera—breaking the fourth wall as if to shift the focus onto the audience—and flashes a smile. The ending is seemingly ambiguous.

== Cast ==
- Lili Reinhart as Daisy Morris
- Daniela Melchior as Ava Lopez
- Jeremy Ang Jones as Paul Hui
- Josh Whitehouse as Isaac
- Tim Plester as Jeffrey Moore
- Christiane Paul as Joy Jones
- Joel Fry as Bob
- Sean O. McGuiness as Voyeur
- Faith Delaney as Violet Smith
- Mark Ryder as Gus Delong
- Chris Ginesi as Richard Kusser
- Max Croes as Eddie Holt
- Levi Mattey as Andre Koeb
- Alex Lee as Mark Smith

== Production ==
Uta Briesewitz made her feature directorial debut with American Sweatshop, having previously worked as a cinematographer and television director. Matthew Nemeth wrote the screenplay. Lili Reinhart signed on for the film's lead role in May 2024. Daniela Melchior joined the cast in a major supporting role in August 2024. Filming took place in Cologne, Germany at MMC Studios and also in Bonn in the summer of 2024. The Film and Media Foundation NRW of Germany supported the project spending €400,000.

== Release ==
American Sweatshop premiered at the 2025 South by Southwest Film & TV Festival in March 2025. Plaion Pictures will distribute the film in Germany. In June 2025, Brainstorm Media acquired the North American distribution rights to the film, and released it on VOD in the U.S. on September 19. Myriad Pictures handled international sales.

== Reception ==
On the review aggregator website Rotten Tomatoes, 81% of 21 critics' reviews are positive. The website's consensus reads: "Led by Lili Reinhart's powerful portrayal of a deteriorating mind, American Sweatshop delivers a bracingly tense exploration of the dark side of digital labor and 21st century disillusionment." Metacritic, which uses a weighted average, assigned the film a score of 58 out of 100, based on six critics, indicating "mixed or average" reviews.
