= Ratcatcher (comics) =

DC Comics character

Publication information
- Publisher: DC Comics
- First appearance: Detective Comics #585 (April 1988)
- Created by: Alan Grant (writer); John Wagner (writer); Norm Breyfogle (artist)

In-story information
- Alter ego: Otis Flannegan
- Species: Metahuman
- Place of origin: Gotham City
- Abilities: Control over an army of sewer rats; Manipulation over various things with cyanide gases; Use of gas gun

The Ratcatcher (Otis Flannegan) is a character appearing in American comic books and other media published by DC Comics, primarily as an enemy of Batman. He belongs to the collective of adversaries that make up the Dark Knight's rogues gallery. Once an actual rat-catcher in Gotham City, Flannegan sank into a life of crime. Calling himself the Ratcatcher because of his special ability to communicate with and train rats, he has used his minions to plague Gotham on more than one occasion by unleashing hordes of the vermin.

A female version of the character named Cleo Cazo / Ratcatcher 2 appeared in the DC Extended Universe film The Suicide Squad (2021), portrayed by Daniela Melchior. Taika Waititi portrayed the first Ratcatcher, Cleo's father.

== Publication history ==
The Ratcatcher first appeared in Detective Comics #585 (April 1988) and was created by writers Alan Grant and John Wagner, and artist Norm Breyfogle.

== Fictional character biography ==
Otis Flannegan is a former rat-catcher in the Gotham City Sanitation Department who claims he could train rats to attack before he is arrested and sentenced to ten years in Gotham State Penitentiary after stabbing a man to death in a street fight. After being released from prison, Flannegan kidnaps the four officials responsible for his arrest and subsequent sentence and takes them to his hideout in the city's sewers, where he keeps them for five years. During this period, Flannegan develops his criminal alter-ego of the Ratcatcher. Wearing protective equipment and using his animal training skills, Flannegan gathers a swarm of rats to torture and restrain his prisoners.

After five years of captivity, one of Flannegan's prisoners escapes. Though he orders his rats to kill him, the latter reaches the surface, where Batman discovers his body, tracks down Flannegan, and easily defeats him upon dispersing his rats. After being re-incarcerated, Flannegan escapes his parole hearing using a flute he carved to control rats via a high-pitched frequency, only to be foiled by Dick Grayson disguised as Batman and captured again.

During the events of Infinite Crisis, Flannegan finds refuge with Gotham's homeless community. One of the homeless men discovers that he is an OMAC while attempting to help Flannegan and vaporizes him.

In The New 52 continuity reboot, Flannegan is resurrected and makes a minor appearance in Batman Eternal.

== Powers and abilities ==
The Ratcatcher possesses the ability to communicate and control an army of rats and in-depth knowledge of Gotham City's sewer system and Blackgate Penitentiary's layout. Additionally, he wields a gas gun and can manipulate various objects with cyanide gas.

== Other versions ==
- An original alternate universe incarnation of the Ratcatcher named Ransom Trappe appears in Master Comics as an enemy of Bulletman and Bulletgirl.
- An alternate reality version of Otis Flannegan appears in Mother Panic. This version has reformed, retired, and moved into the basement of the hotel that Violet Paige uses as her headquarters.

== In other media ==
=== Television ===
- The Ratcatcher appears in Harley Quinn, voiced by James Adomian. This version is an underling of Two-Face.
- The Ratcatcher appears in Suicide Squad Isekai, voiced by Yōji Ueda in the original Japanese version and by Adam Noble in the English dub. This version bears a grudge against Deadshot for slandering him. After being recruited into the Suicide Squad and sent to another world, he escaped and gained a magic scepter that allows him to control other animals, such as werewolves. After Deadshot destroys his scepter, Ratcatcher's thralls betray him.

=== Film ===
An original, female incarnation of the Ratcatcher named Cleo Cazo / Ratcatcher 2 appears in The Suicide Squad, portrayed by Daniela Melchior as an adult and by Maya Le Clark as a child. This version is the daughter of an unnamed previous Ratcatcher (portrayed by Taika Waititi), who was originally from Portugal and died from a heroin overdose. Following this, Cazo came to America and used her father's equipment to become a criminal, only to be arrested for armed bank robbery due to authorities considering rats as weapons and incarcerated in Belle Reve Penitentiary. Sometime later, Cazo and her pet rat Sebastian (vocal effects provided by Dee Bradley Baker) join the eponymous squad to infiltrate and destroy Jötenheim, a Corto Maltesean laboratory containing the alien Starro. Along the way, she forms bonds with her teammates Bloodsport, despite his fear of rats, and King Shark.

=== Video games ===
- The Ratcatcher appears as a boss in Batman: Dark Tomorrow, voiced by Jeff Meller.
- The Ratcatcher appears as a character summon in Scribblenauts Unmasked: A DC Comics Adventure.
- The Ratcatcher appears in Batman: Arkham Shadow, voiced by Khary Payton. This version is African-American and an inmate of the Blackgate Penitentiary.
- Ratcatcher 2 and Sebastian make cameo appearances as non-player characters (NPC) in Lego Batman: Legacy of the Dark Knight.

=== Miscellaneous ===
- The Ratcatcher appears in Batman: Arkham Unhinged as a juror in Two-Face's trial against the Joker, during which he votes guilty in retaliation for the latter poisoning his rats.
- The Ratcatcher appears in Batman: Arkham Knight – Genesis #1. Following the events of Batman: Arkham City, he survived an encounter with the Penguin, but lost his left eye and arm, before he is eventually killed by the Arkham Knight.
- The Ratcatcher appears in Batman: The Adventures Continue #16.

== See also ==
- List of Batman family enemies
- Pied Piper, a similarly themed Flash villain
- Pied Piper of Hamelin
