= Max Croes =

Dutch actor and model

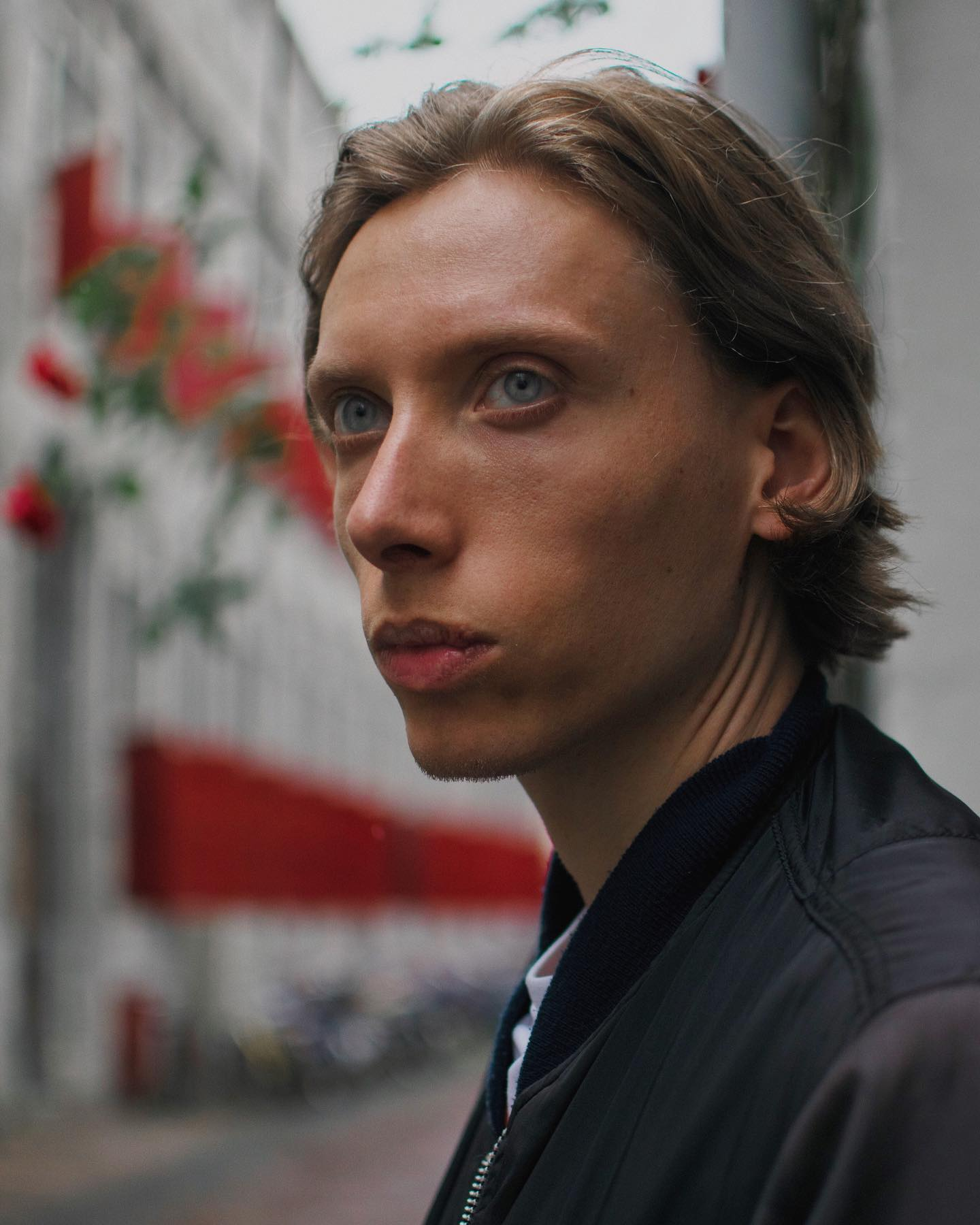
- Born: Maximiliaan Johannes Rudolf Croes; Netherlands
- Education: University of Amsterdam
- Occupations: Actor; Model
- Years active: 2016–present
- Website: www.maxcroes.com

Maximiliaan Johannes Rudolf Croes is a Dutch actor and model.

== Early life and education ==
Croes grew up in Italy and briefly lived in Belgium before moving to the Netherlands to complete his double Bachelor in Communications and Law, following a Master's degree in IP-law at the University of Amsterdam. Shortly after, he turned to acting and moved to London.

== Career ==
Shortly after moving to the UK, Croes got cast in National Geographic series Locked Up Abroad. In November 2018 it was announced that Croes got cast in upcoming Elton John biopic Rocketman.

In the following years, Croes expanded his career with roles in television and independent films.

In 2025, he appeared in A Working Man, opposite Jason Statham. This was followed by roles in upcoming thriller American Sweatshop and Pressure, further establishing himself in international productions.

== Filmography ==
=== Film ===
Year	Title	Role	Notes	Ref.
2026	Pressure	Private Eugene Shaw	Feature Film	
2025	American Sweatshop	Eddie Holt	Feature Film	
2025	A Working Man	Karp	Feature Film	
2019	Rocketman	Parklands Patient	Feature Film	

=== Television ===
Year	Title	Role	Ref.
2024	Flikken Maastricht	Dealer	
2023	Het Verhaal van Nederland	Engelbrecht van Oranje-Nassau	
2023	Ferry: The Series	The Cook	
2022	Fils de	Homme Kremers	
2018	Locked Up Abroad	Tom Whitmore	
