= Assassin Club =

- Directed by: Camille Delamarre
- Written by: Thomas C. Dunn
- Produced by: Ellen Wander; Jordan Dykstra; Todd Lundbohm; Emanuele Moretti; Kieran Corrigan
- Starring: Henry Golding; Noomi Rapace; Daniela Melchior; Jimmy Jean-Louis; Sam Neill
- Edited by: Lori Ball
- Music by: Alexandre Azaria
- Production companies: Film Bridge International; 828 Media Capital
- Distributed by: Paramount Global Content Distribution
- Release date: May 16, 2023
- Running time: 111 minutes
- Countries: United States; Italy
- Language: English
- Box office: $188,292

Assassin Club is a 2023 action thriller film written by Thomas C. Dunn, directed by Camille Delamarre and starring Henry Golding and Noomi Rapace along with Daniela Melchior, Jimmy Jean-Louis and Sam Neill.

Assassin Club centers around Morgan Gaines, a former Royal Marines officer turned ruthless assassin who unwittingly enters a deadly game in which each of the six targets is also an assassin assigned to eliminate Morgan.

== Plot ==
Morgan Gaines, a former Royal Marine sniper turned professional assassin, is tasked by his employer and mentor, Ian Caldwell, with assassinating a European human trafficking kingpin named Luka Lesek. During the mission, Morgan is attacked and wounded by another assassin, forcing him to flee as the attacker kills Lesek. Morgan meets with Caldwell and attempts to end their partnership, wanting to retire and live a peaceful life with his girlfriend Sophie. Caldwell offers Morgan one final job of six separate contacts for one million dollars each, but Morgan refuses. The next night, Morgan and Sophie are attacked on their walk home, but Morgan kills their attacker and they flee. Morgan questions Caldwell about the incident and Caldwell reveals that the attacker was Alec Drakos, the same man who interrupted Morgan's assassination attempt on Lesek, and also one of the six targets in the job Caldwell offered Morgan. All six targets are assassins as well, and they have all been offered the same job, to kill each other. Morgan still wants out, but Caldwell tells him the five other remaining assassins still have contracts for him, and they will come for him whether he wants the job or not.

Morgan identifies his five targets: sadistic serial killer Anaselm Ryder, poison expert Pablo Martinez, martial artist Yuko, imprisoned criminal Demir, and the mysterious Falk, whose identity is unknown. Falk infiltrates the prison Demir is being held in, kills him, and severs his thumb. Inspector Leon, a French police officer who is assigned to track down the assassins, receives Demir's thumb in his PO box and brings it to a forensics lab. He then meets with Joona Ilyich, a wealthy benefactor helping the French police with the investigation in the hopes of discovering the identity of the person who murdered her father, a wealthy and powerful businessman named Yakov Ilyich, when she was young. Morgan tracks down Leon and interrogates him about the origin of the contract, and Leon reveals that the French police created it in collaboration with Joona. Later, Morgan is contacted by Falk, who offers to work with him to find the person behind the contract; she reveals that all of the assassins had previously been hired at various points by Mariusz Ilyich, Joona's uncle, and she suspects that Mariusz is the one who had his brother assassinated in order to take over Yakov's business empire. Falk then provides Morgan Pablo Martinez's location as a gesture of good faith. Morgan finds Martinez and prepares to kill him, but spares his life upon realizing he is long retired and lives peacefully with his four-year-old daughter. That night, Yuko arrives to kill Pablo, but Morgan fights and kills her before severing a finger from Pablo to protect him by using it to fool the police and Joona into thinking he is dead.

Falk comes to Caldwell and demands his files on Morgan, and Caldwell secretly transfers his files on Falk to Morgan before Falk kills him. Investigating the files, Morgan learns that Falk's real name is Vos and she is a police officer working with Leon in the assassin case. Vos sends Morgan's file to Ryder, who then attempts to kill Sophie to draw Morgan out, but Sophie eludes him. Morgan sends Sophie away to stay with her mother in Lisbon while he finds Ryder and interrogates him. Ryder reveals that Falk also contacted him, offering him all the same information she offered Morgan, and says that she has been manipulating everyone. Falk/Vos, who is tracking both Morgan and Ryder's locations, arrives with GIGN forces and Ryder is killed but Morgan escapes. Morgan then tells Leon everything he knows and convinces him to help him apprehend Vos. The two lure Vos into a trap and Morgan beats her in a fight but is forced to flee when more police show up before he can kill her.

Morgan infiltrates Joona's home and confronts her, but Joona reveals that the contract was all Vos's idea, and Joona simply provided the funding, which has also now disappeared. Morgan informs Joona that Vos and Falk are the same person, that Falk is the one who assassinated Joona's father, and that she set up the contract to take the money for herself, cover her tracks, and disappear. Wanting to tie up loose ends, Falk kidnaps Sophie and lures Morgan to her location, having set a trap for him, but Leon arrives to help, having received a call from Morgan after Morgan learned Sophie had been kidnapped. Falk shoots Leon and escapes, but Leon helps free Sophie despite his injuries and Morgan goes after Falk and shoots her in the street, then flees the scene.

Sometime later, Morgan and Sophie live peacefully in Porto, Portugal. Meanwhile, Falk wakes up in a hospital, having survived her gunshot wound.

== Cast ==
- Henry Golding as Morgan Ganes
- Daniela Melchior as Sophie
- Jimmy Jean-Louis as Inspector Leon
- Noomi Rapace as Falk/Agent Vos
- Sam Neill as Caldwell

== Release ==
The film was released in digital in the United States on May 16, 2023.

== Reception ==
The film received generally negative reviews, and has a 13% rating on review aggregator site Rotten Tomatoes based on 23 reviews. Simon Abrams of RogerEbert.com awarded the film one star, writing "While the ideal viewer of Assassin Club probably understands and accepts the limitations of this bottom-dollar time-waster, even the least choosy genre fans can do better." Verdosa of Screen Rant awarded the film one and a half stars out of five. Martin Unsworth of Starburst awarded the film two stars out of five. John Nugent of Empire awarded the film one star out of five.

Sergio Pereira of Comic Book Resources gave the film a positive review and wrote, "Assassin Club isn't about to knock John Wick off his perch, but it is an entertaining, turn-off-the-brain movie in the same vein as other '90s classics like Assassins and Hard Target."
