= Marlowe (2022 film) =

2022 film directed by Neil Jordan

- American theatrical release poster
- Directed by: Neil Jordan
- Screenplay by: William Monahan; Neil Jordan
- Based on: The Black-Eyed Blonde by Benjamin Black
- Produced by: Philip Kim; Patrick Hibler; Alan Moloney; Gary Levinsohn; Mark Fasano; Billy Hines
- Starring: Liam Neeson; Diane Kruger; Jessica Lange; Adewale Akinnuoye-Agbaje; Ian Hart; Colm Meaney; Daniela Melchior; François Arnaud; Seána Kerslake; Danny Huston; Alan Cumming
- Cinematography: Xavi Giménez
- Edited by: Mick Mahon
- Music by: David Holmes
- Production companies: Parallel Films; Hills Productions; Davis Films
- Distributed by: Metropolitan Filmexport (France); Diamond Films (Spain); Sky Cinema; Miracle Communications (Ireland)
- Release dates: 24 September 2022 (Zinemaldia); 15 February 2023 (United States)
- Running time: 109 minutes
- Countries: France; Ireland; Spain
- Language: English
- Budget: €22.3 million
- Box office: €5,9 million

Marlowe is a 2022 neo-noir crime thriller film directed by Neil Jordan, who co-wrote the screenplay with William Monahan. Based on the 2014 novel The Black-Eyed Blonde by John Banville, writing under the pen name Benjamin Black, the film stars Liam Neeson as private detective Philip Marlowe, a fictional character created by Raymond Chandler. It features Diane Kruger, Jessica Lange, Adewale Akinnuoye-Agbaje, Alan Cumming, Francois Arnaud, Ian Hart, Danny Huston, Daniela Melchior and Colm Meaney.

It premiered at the 70th San Sebastián International Film Festival on 24 September 2022 and was theatrically released in the United States on 15 February 2023, by Open Road Films and Briarcliff Entertainment. The film made $6.2 million in theaters and received generally negative reviews from critics.

== Plot ==
In 1939 Bay City, California, private detective Philip Marlowe is hired by glamorous heiress Clare Cavendish to find her missing lover, Nico Peterson, a prop master at Pacific Film Studios. Marlowe discovers that Peterson was killed after being run over outside the exclusive Corbata Club. When he informs Cavendish of Peterson's death, she insists she recently saw Peterson in Tijuana. Frustrated by her secrecy, Marlowe leaves, encountering Cavendish's mother, former film star Dorothy Quincannon.

Marlowe visits Peterson's grave and encounters a grieving woman who flees. His friend, homicide detective Joe Green, declines to investigate the true victim as he was positively identified by the Corbata's owner Floyd Hanson. Marlowe meets Hanson at the club, but both fail to extract information from each other. As he leaves, Marlowe spots the woman from the grave—Peterson's sister, Lynn—and arranges to meet her later at the Cabana Club. Their conversation is observed by Hanson. When Marlowe arrives, he is unsuccessfully ambushed by two men.

Quincannon attempts to hire Marlowe to find Peterson herself. She admits that her strained relationship with Cavendish stems from years of pretending she was her niece, following the advice of her former lover, Pacific's owner Joseph O'Reilly. Quincannon discloses that Peterson was the talent agent for actress Amanda Toxteth, who informs Marlowe that Peterson frequently smuggled cocaine from Tijuana. Marlowe breaks into Peterson's house and finds Lynn, but they are ambushed by two Mexican men searching for someone called "Serena". Marlowe is knocked unconscious, and Lynn is taken captive.

Later, Marlowe is picked up by drug lord Lou Hendricks and his henchman, Cedric. Hendricks reveals that Peterson smuggled drugs for, and has stolen a large amount of cocaine from, him. Marlowe enlists his friend, police officer Bernie Ohls, to search for Lynn. Meanwhile, Cavendish visits Marlowe and attempts to seduce him. He rejects her advances but agrees to dance with her. Later, he secretly follows her to a rendezvous with O'Reilly and encounters Quincannon, who expresses her anger over her daughter's relationship with the much older and influential O'Reilly.

The next day, Ohls discloses to Marlowe that Lynn was tortured, raped, and murdered. He traces the Mexican assailants to the Corbata and gives Marlowe his unofficial support to avenge Lynn. Marlowe confronts Hanson, who offers him a drink. Suspecting it is poisoned, Marlowe disposes of it and feigns death. Hanson has Marlowe taken to a hidden area where the Mexicans have been killed, Hendricks is being tortured, and Cedric has been restrained. Hendricks reveals that "Serena" is a mermaid statue containing the stolen cocaine, which Peterson hid in a nearby fish tank. Marlowe frees Cedric, and together they kill Hanson and his men, inadvertently destroying the statue and the drugs. When Hendricks threatens Cedric with lifelong debt to repay their value, Cedric kills him.

Marlowe returns home to find Peterson waiting for him. Peterson admits to feeling no guilt over Lynn's death, and his "dead body" was a musician who resembled him. He asks Marlowe to arrange a meeting with Cavendish at the studio prop house.

Peterson meets Cavendish and reveals his intent to sell records of every drug deal made through the studio to the highest bidder, which would destroy O'Reilly's reputation. As Marlowe arrives, Cavendish betrays Peterson, setting him and the evidence on fire. Marlowe deduces that she wanted him to find Peterson to ensure he was dead, and O'Reilly will now be indebted to her. He chooses not to turn her in but takes her gun.

Sometime later, Cavendish has become vice president of the studio and is attempting to reconcile with her mother, who has returned to acting. She offers Marlowe a job as the head of security, but he instead recommends Cedric. He later gives Cavendish's gun to Cedric for security.

== Cast ==
- Liam Neeson as Philip Marlowe
- Diane Kruger as Clare Cavendish
- Jessica Lange as Dorothy Quincannon
- Adewale Akinnuoye-Agbaje as Cedric
- Colm Meaney as Bernie Ohls
- Daniela Melchior as Lynn Peterson
- Alan Cumming as Lou Hendricks
- Danny Huston as Floyd Hanson
- Seána Kerslake as Amanda Toxteth
- François Arnaud as Nico Peterson
- Ian Hart as Joe Green
- Patrick Muldoon as Richard Cavendish
- Mitchell Mullen as Joseph O'Reilly, "The Ambassador"

== Production ==
Marlowe is actor Liam Neeson's 100th film. William Monahan wrote the screenplay, adapting it from the 2014 novel The Black-Eyed Blonde by John Banville. Neeson came on board to star in March 2017, and Neil Jordan signed on to direct in June 2021. Additional castings were announced in November 2021.

Principal photography took place for two months, starting in November 2021. Filming for exterior scenes set in Los Angeles took place in Barcelona, Spain, while interior scenes were shot in Dublin, Ireland. Jordan cited the 1982 film Blade Runner as an influence on the film's look, stating, "I'm making a film set in L.A. in the past, but somehow it's a sci-fi film. [...] It was a good reference for the designers and camera team."

== Release ==
Marlowe had its world premiere on 24 September 2022, as the closing film of the 70th San Sebastián International Film Festival. It was originally set for a 2 December 2022 release in the United States, but was delayed to 15 February 2023.

== Reception ==
=== Box office ===
The film made $1.8 million in its opening weekend (and a total of $2.9 million over its first five days) from 2,281 theaters, finishing in eighth.

=== Critical response ===
On Rotten Tomatoes, the film has a 26% rating based on 108 reviews, with an average rating of 4.9/10. The critics consensus reads: "Liam Neeson isn't necessarily a bad fit for the classic character, but Marlowe fails to make a case for itself as either a worthwhile franchise extension or a fun mystery in its own right." Metacritic assigned the film a weighted average score of 41 out of 100, based on 24 critics, indicating "mixed or average reviews". Audiences polled by PostTrak gave the film a 51% positive score, with 27% saying they would "definitely recommend" it.

Reviewing from the San Sebastián International Film Festival, Screen Daily wrote, "With some crunchingly incongruous gags about famous screen MacGuffins, the knowing screenplay by Jordan and William Monahan...doesn't feel devious enough in its plotting or sufficiently fresh in reimagining either its hero or his LA world". Guy Lodge from Variety wrote in his review, "Jordan's film is both resolutely conservative in its period framing and irksomely postmodern in its audience pandering".

After its theatrical release, a review from Chicago Sun-Times's Richard Roeper said, "Thanks to the high-end production values, the juicy script and the vigorous performances from that first-rate cast, it's great to see another iteration of Marlowe on the case". Mick LaSalle writing for San Francisco Chronicle said, "It's not a terrible movie, but a terribly misbegotten one, off in all its details. This is the work of a reasonable, intelligent director, Neil Jordan...who had a bad idea and then compounded it with wrong choices and crazy casting." Frank Scheck from The Hollywood Reporter wrote, "But for all the authentic genre tropes on display, Marlowe never comes to life on its own, lacking the verve or wit to make it feel anything other than a great pop song played by a mediocre cover band".
