= The Suicide Squad (film) =

2021 superhero film by James Gunn

- Release poster
- Directed by: James Gunn
- Written by: James Gunn
- Based on: Characters from DC
- Produced by: Charles Roven; Peter Safran
- Starring: Margot Robbie; Idris Elba; John Cena; Joel Kinnaman; Jai Courtney; Peter Capaldi; Sylvester Stallone; Viola Davis
- Cinematography: Henry Braham
- Edited by: Fred Raskin; Christian Wagner
- Music by: John Murphy
- Production companies: Warner Bros. Pictures; DC Films; Atlas Entertainment; The Safran Company
- Distributed by: Warner Bros. Pictures
- Release dates: July 30, 2021 (United Kingdom); August 6, 2021 (United States)
- Running time: 132 minutes
- Country: United States
- Languages: English; Spanish
- Budget: $185 million
- Box office: $168.7 million

The Suicide Squad is a 2021 American superhero film based on the DC Comics team Suicide Squad. Written and directed by James Gunn, it is a sequel to Suicide Squad (2016) and the tenth film in the DC Extended Universe (DCEU). The film stars an ensemble cast including Margot Robbie, Idris Elba, John Cena, Joel Kinnaman, David Dastmalchian, Daniela Melchior, Michael Rooker, Jai Courtney, Peter Capaldi, Alice Braga, Pete Davidson, Sylvester Stallone, and Viola Davis. In the film, a group of convicts join a task force known as the "Suicide Squad" in exchange for lighter sentences. They are sent to the South American island nation of Corto Maltese to destroy all traces of the giant alien starfish Starro the Conqueror before it falls into the local government's control.

Warner Bros. Pictures originally hired Gavin O'Connor to direct. However, O'Connor left due to creative differences, and Gunn was hired to write and direct the film after being temporarily fired by Disney and Marvel Studios as director of Guardians of the Galaxy Vol. 3 (2023). He drew inspiration from war films and John Ostrander's 1980s Suicide Squad comics. Filming took place from September 2019 to February 2020, primarily in Atlanta, Georgia, as well as in Colón, Panama, and Porto, Portugal. The film had the biggest sets ever built for a Warner Bros. production.

The Suicide Squad premiered theatrically in the United Kingdom on July 30, 2021, and was released in the United States on August 5, simultaneously in theaters and on the streaming service HBO Max. Unlike its predecessor, the film received positive reviews from critics and became the second most-streamed DCEU film on HBO Max. The Suicide Squad grossed $169 million against a $185 million production budget. Its box office performance was attributed to factors such as the COVID-19 pandemic, the film's availability on HBO Max, and its relationship to the first Suicide Squad. It was followed by a spin-off television series, Peacemaker, in 2022, and an animated series, Creature Commandos, in 2024. In October 2026, it was announced that the film would be retroactively integrated as the first installment in the rebooted DC Universe.

== Plot ==
Intelligence officer Amanda Waller assembles two Task Force X teams, colloquially known as the "Suicide Squad", which consists of Belle Reve penitentiary inmates who agree to carry out missions in exchange for commuted sentences. The teams are sent to the South American island nation of Corto Maltese after an anti-American regime overthrows its government and are tasked with destroying the Nazi-era laboratory Jötunheim, which houses the secret experiment "Project Starfish".

Upon making landfall, most of the first team is slaughtered by the Corto Maltese military, who capture Harley Quinn while team leader Rick Flag Jr. escapes. Elsewhere, the second team – led by assassin Bloodsport, whom Waller blackmailed in exchange for not sending his estranged daughter Tyla to prison, and consisting of Peacemaker, King Shark, Polka-Dot Man, Ratcatcher 2, and her pet rat Sebastian – enters the country undetected, revealing that the other team was a deliberate decoy. Waller orders the squad to find Flag, who is being held at a rebel base. The team massacres the rebel soldiers, only to learn that rebellion leader Sol Soria had saved Flag. Despite the group's actions, Soria agrees to help them infiltrate the capital, where they capture Project Starfish's lead scientist, the Thinker. Harley is taken to Corto Maltese's new dictator, Silvio Luna, who wishes to marry her. Harley is initially enchanted by this proposition, but after learning of Luna's plans to use Project Starfish on political dissidents, including children, she kills him and escapes. She joins the others, who use the Thinker to break into Jötunheim, in exchange for sparing his life, and begin rigging it with explosives.

Flag and Ratcatcher 2 enter the Thinker's laboratory and find Starro the Conqueror, a giant starfish-like alien that creates smaller versions of itself to kill people and control their bodies. The Thinker explains that Starro was brought to Earth by American astronauts, that the U.S. government has secretly funded experiments on it for decades using Corto Maltesean citizens and political enemies of the prior dictatorship as test subjects, that said regime used Project Starfish to strengthen its rule, and that Waller sent them to cover up American ties to the project. An enraged Flag decides to leak a hard drive containing evidence of this, but is killed by Peacemaker, who is under orders from Waller to ensure the coverup. Meanwhile, a skirmish between the rest of the team and the military leads to Polka-Dot Man accidentally setting off the explosives prematurely. As Jötunheim crumbles, the drive falls into Ratcatcher 2's possession. Peacemaker attempts to kill her before she can escape with it, but Bloodsport shoots him and takes it.

Starro escapes the destroyed Jötunheim, kills the Thinker and much of the military, and begins taking control of the island's population. Waller tells the squad that their mission is complete and orders them to leave, but Bloodsport leads the team in fighting Starro. Waller, wanting to keep the squad's secrecy from the public, attempts to execute them for this, but her subordinates knock her out. Polka-Dot Man weakens Starro, but is killed. Harley pierces a hole in Starro's eye, allowing Ratcatcher 2 to summon the city's rats to chew it to death from the inside. With the military diverted, Soria takes control of the government, promising democratic elections. Bloodsport blackmails Waller into releasing him and the surviving squad members and dropping Tyla's charges in exchange for keeping the contents of the drive confidential. Waller reluctantly agrees and the remaining squad members are airlifted out of Corto Maltese; Harley proposes she and Bloodsport become friends with each other, in honor of their fallen common friend Flag.

In a mid-credits scene, it is revealed that Weasel, a member of the first team, has survived and runs off into the jungle. In a post-credits scene, Waller punishes two of her subordinates, Emilia Harcourt and John Economos, by assigning them to a new mission with Peacemaker, who is still alive and recovering in a hospital. (Note: This scene sets up the events of the first season of the spin-off television series Peacemaker (2022).)

== Cast ==
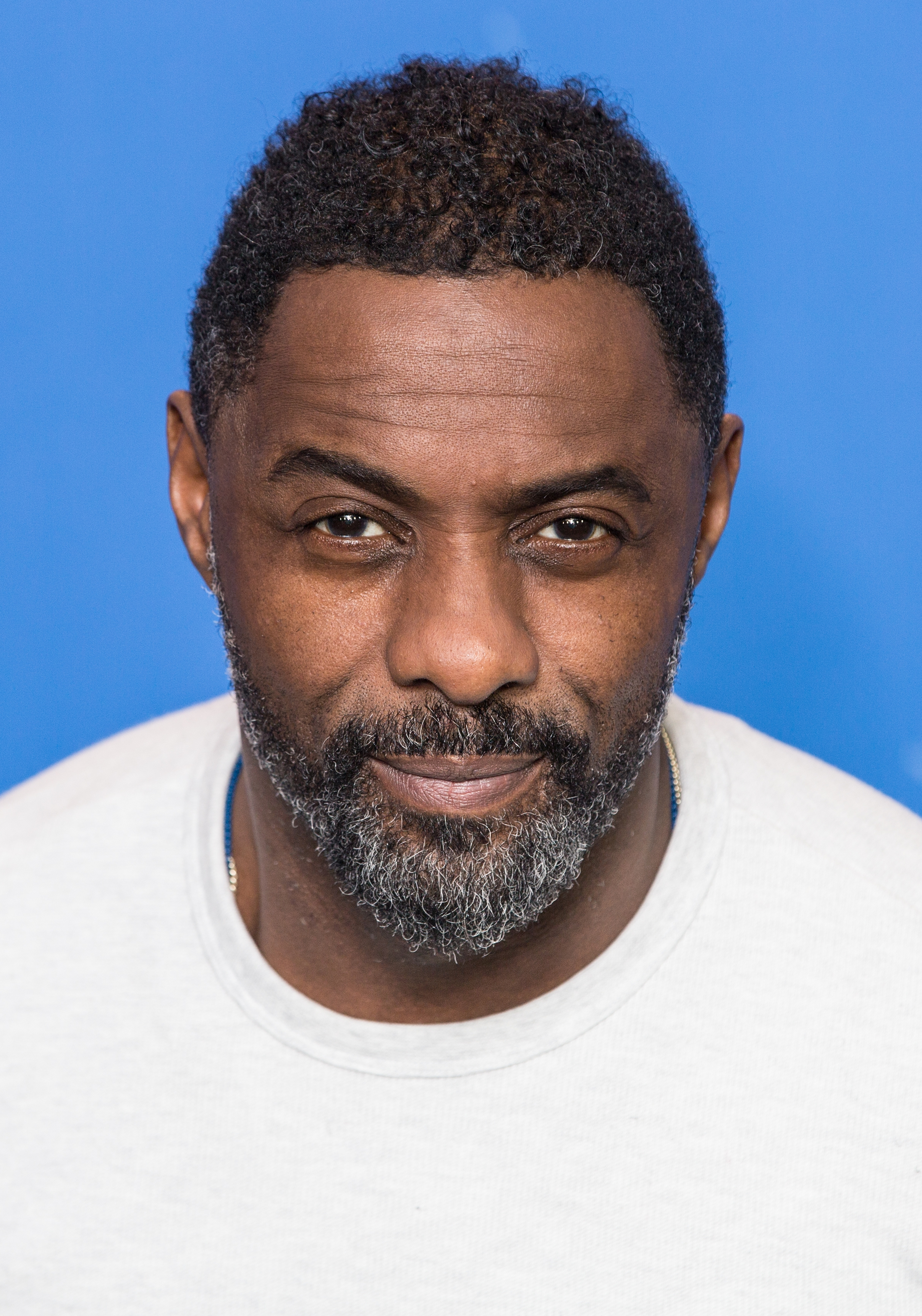
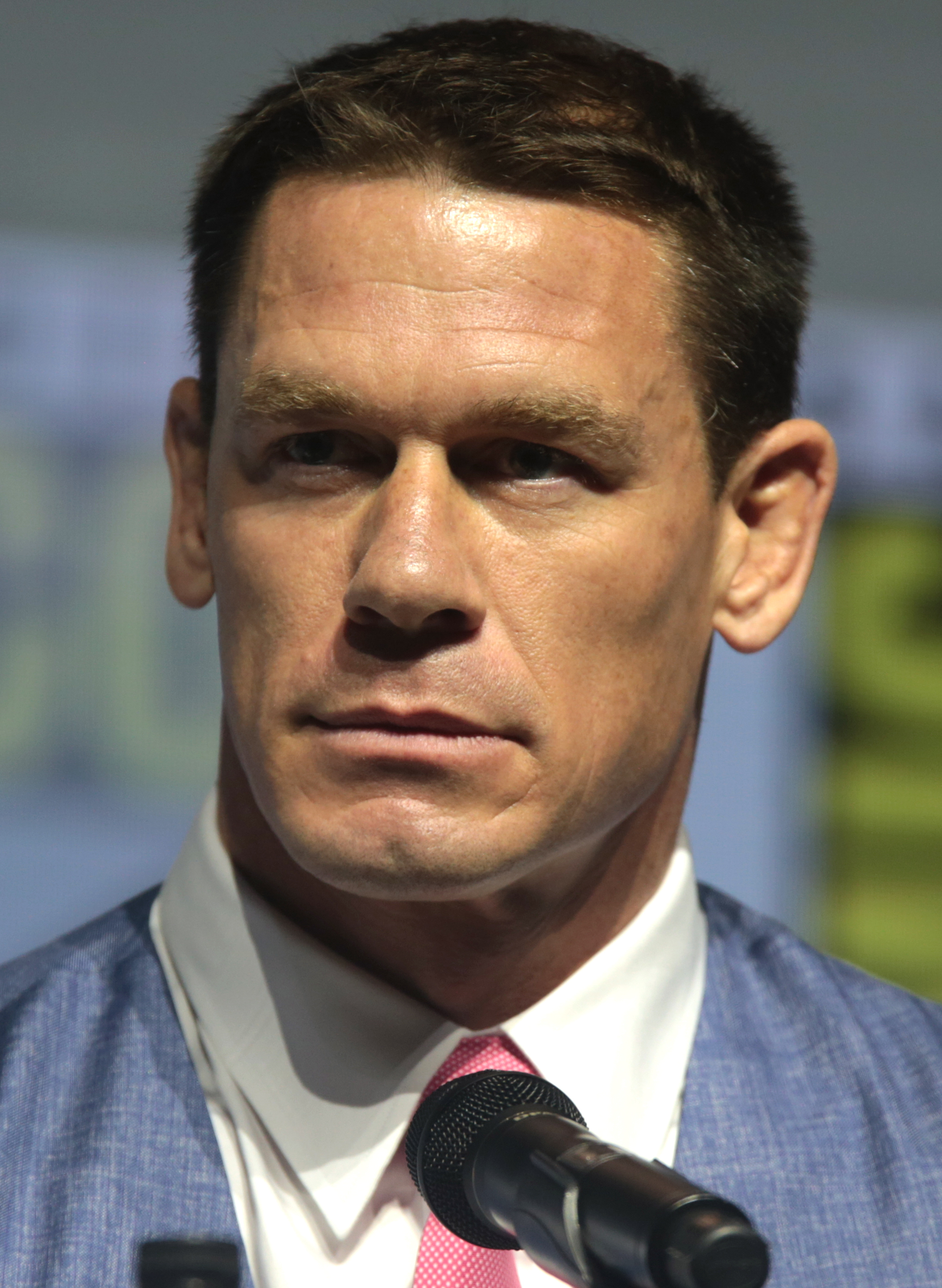
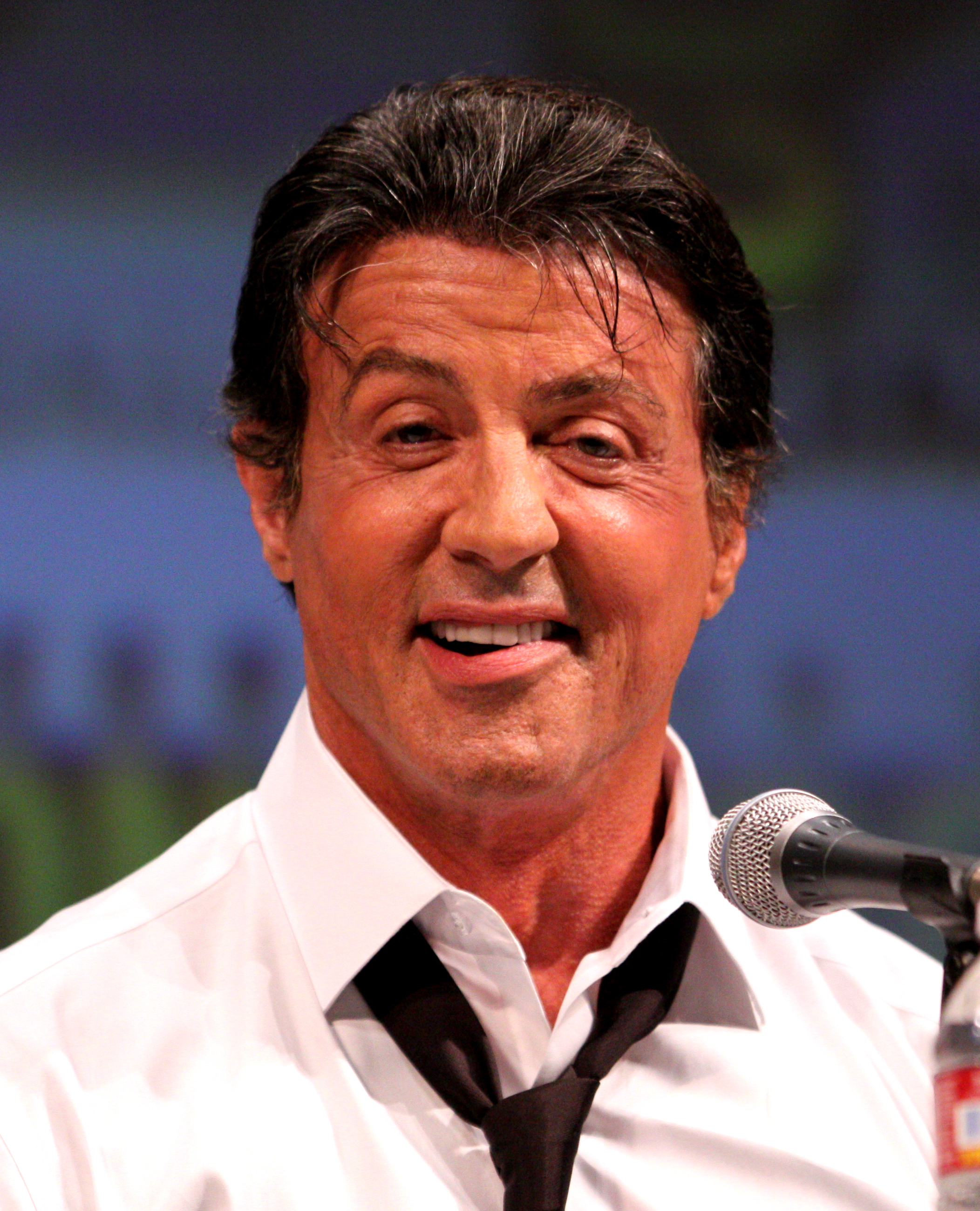
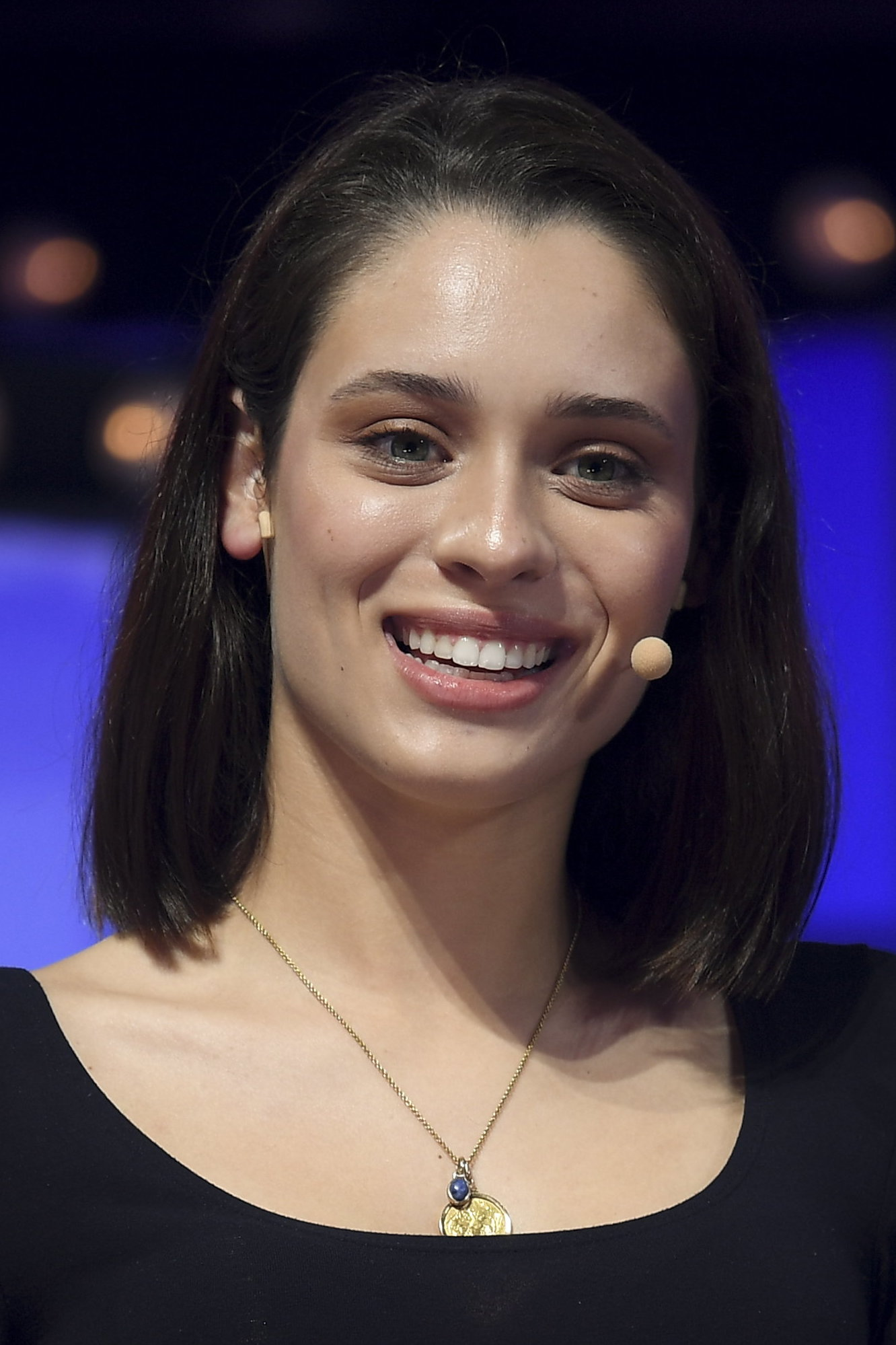
The film's second Suicide Squad team includes Idris Elba as Bloodsport, John Cena as Peacemaker, Sylvester Stallone as the voice of King Shark, and Daniela Melchior as Ratcatcher 2.
- Margot Robbie as Dr. Harleen Quinzel / Harley Quinn:
  A crazed criminal and former psychiatrist. Robbie said the film would show a new side of the character compared to her previous DC Extended Universe (DCEU) appearances due to her being in a new place and surrounded by new characters. Despite inheriting this version of Harley from previous films, writer/director James Gunn loved the character and felt very comfortable writing for her. He wanted her to be "the most Harley of all Harleys" depicted on film, including making "healthy" choices, following her toxic relationship with the Joker, that other people would find insane. He likened Harley's relationship with Bloodsport to the comedy duo Abbott and Costello, with Harley being Costello.
- Idris Elba as Robert DuBois / Bloodsport:
  A mercenary with a technologically advanced suit that he can use to create different gadgets and transforming weaponry (an adaptation of the comic book character's ability to manifest weapons). After being convicted of shooting Superman with a Kryptonite bullet, Bloodsport shortens his prison sentence by joining Task Force X so he can help his daughter Tyla. Gunn said each member of the Suicide Squad in the film was inspired by a different film genre, and described Bloodsport as an unsentimental portrayal of a 1960s action hero like Steve McQueen, without their "moral repercussions". The character's story in the film takes him from a "toxic asshole to a true leader".
- John Cena as Christopher Smith / Peacemaker:
  A ruthless, jingoistic killer who believes in achieving peace at any cost. Gunn told Cena not to read any Peacemaker comics before filming, and Cena originally approached the role with an "angular, drill sergeant, Full Metal Jacket (1987)–esque personality" before Gunn told him to act like a "douchey, bro-y Captain America" who could have appeared in a 1970s television series like Wonder Woman. The character does not get as much exploration or development as the other members of the Suicide Squad, which is one of the reasons that Gunn decided to create the spin-off television series Peacemaker despite him originally intending for the character's apparent death in the film to be permanent.
- Joel Kinnaman as Colonel Rick Flag Jr.:
  The field leader of the Suicide Squad. Gunn said Flag was the character that changed the most compared to the first Suicide Squad (2016), with Kinnaman describing this version as sillier, less jaded, more naive, and funnier. Gunn said Kinnaman was not used to comedic acting but "quickly showed a talent and an affinity" for it. Flag begins the film on the Suicide Squad team that Amanda Waller sends as a decoy, and a deleted scene would have explained that she did this because he made fun of an ugly shirt she was wearing. Gunn said Flag has grown sick of being taken advantage of and doing bad things, which leads to him disobeying Waller and being killed by Peacemaker.
- Sylvester Stallone as the voice of Nanaue / King Shark:
  A man-eating shark-human hybrid, created with visual effects. Steve Agee, a longtime friend of Gunn's, developed King Shark's portrayal on set. He was chosen partly because he is 6 feet 7 inches (2.01 m), and wore a wireframe version of a shark head as well as a body suit to further approximate the character's size and shape. Gunn wanted the underlying story for King Shark to explore his loneliness as someone who wants to be part of the world and connect with other people, but is not able to due to his appearance. This is seen in moments where he pretends to read or looks longingly out a window at a couple who are together.
- Viola Davis as Amanda Waller:
  The director of A.R.G.U.S. who runs the Task Force X program. Gunn said Waller, along with the U.S. government, is the true villain of the film, which explores the different reactions that the Suicide Squad have to her asking them to cover up illegal experiments in Corto Maltese. He added that there was "no better Amanda Waller" than Davis, and said she was "incredibly intimidating" when portraying the character.
- David Dastmalchian as Abner Krill / Polka-Dot Man:
  An "experiment gone wrong" in a suit covered with polka dots. Gunn described Polka-Dot Man as "the dumbest DC character of all time" whom he hoped to turn into a tragic character, with the film's version being infected with an interdimensional virus by his mother in an attempt to turn him into a superhero. The virus develops into colorful balls of acid under Polka-Dot Man's skin that cause him pain unless he expels them as polka-dot weapons or vomits them up. Due to experimentation from his mother, Polka-Dot Man sees everyone as his mother. Unbeknownst to Gunn, Dastmalchian felt a personal connection to the character because he has the skin condition vitiligo, for which he was bullied as a child and called "polka dots".
- Daniela Melchior as Cleo Cazo / Ratcatcher 2:
  A thief who inherited the mantle of "Ratcatcher" from her father, along with equipment that allows her to control rats and communicate with them. Gunn described her as the "heart of the film", and noted that she is different from the other characters because she had her father's love growing up where the other characters had problematic relationships with their parents. Gunn explained that the moment where Ratcatcher 2 covers Bloodsport to protect him from the rats at the end of the film signifies her being able to share her father's love with him, which is why the moment is intercut with a flashback of her sitting with her father.
- Michael Rooker as Brian Durlin / Savant: a hand-to-hand combat and weapons expert. He is killed in the opening scene when Waller detonates a bomb in his head for deserting the mission.
- Jai Courtney as Digger Harkness / Captain Boomerang: an unhinged Australian thief who wields boomerangs. Courtney said the character was "the same shitbag liability" he was in the first film.
- Peter Capaldi as Gaius Grieves / The Thinker: the lead scientist of Project Starfish, who has been experimenting on Starro the Conqueror on behalf of the U.S. government.
- Alice Braga as Sol Soria: the leader of a rebel faction on Corto Maltese who aligns herself with the Suicide Squad.
- Pete Davidson as Richard "Dick" Hertz / Blackguard: an easily manipulated mercenary. He betrays the first Suicide Squad team to the Corto Maltese military, who then kill him.

In addition to playing King Shark on set, Steve Agee portrays John Economos, an A.R.G.U.S. agent who is an aide to Waller. Other aides to Waller include Jennifer Holland as Emilia Harcourt and Tinashe Kajese-Bolden as Flo Crawley, the aide who knocked out Amanda Waller before she could execute the squad and was later arrested in Peacemaker. The ill-fated first Suicide Squad team includes Savant, Captain Boomerang, and Blackguard, as well as Nathan Fillion as Cory Pitzner / T.D.K. (The Detachable Kid), a metahuman who can detach his arms from his body; Flula Borg as Gunter Braun / Javelin, a former Olympic athlete who wields javelins as weapons; Mayling Ng as Mongal, an alien mass murderer; and Sean Gunn as "John Doe" / Weasel, an anthropomorphic weasel whose portrayal is based on Bill the Cat from the comic strip Bloom County. James Gunn said Weasel was "barely more than an animal" which raised some ethical questions about his involvement in the squad.

Also appearing in the film are Juan Diego Botto as President General Silvio Luna, the dictator of Corto Maltese who proposes marriage to Harley Quinn; Joaquín Cosío as Major General Mateo Suárez of Corto Maltese; Storm Reid as Bloodsport's daughter Tyla; Julio Ruiz as Milton, an associate of Task Force X and member of the rebel faction on Corto Maltese; Lynne Ashe as Polka-Dot Man's abusive mother; and Taika Waititi as Ratcatcher 2's father, the original Ratcatcher. In addition to Weasel, Sean Gunn also portrays Calendar Man, one of several DC villains that appear as Belle Reve inmates. Others include Natalia Safran as Kaleidoscope and Jared Leland Gore as Double Down. John Ostrander, creator of the 1980s Suicide Squad team that influenced the film, makes a cameo appearance as Dr. Fitzgibbon, while Stephen Blackehart has a small role as the pilot Briscoe, and both Lloyd Kaufman and Gunn's Guardians of the Galaxy Vol. 2 (2017) collaborator Pom Klementieff appear as dancers in a nightclub in uncredited appearances. Ratcatcher 2's pet rat Sebastian was voiced by Dee Bradley Baker and portrayed on-set by rats named Jaws and Crisp Ratt.

== Production ==
=== Development ===
==== Original plans ====
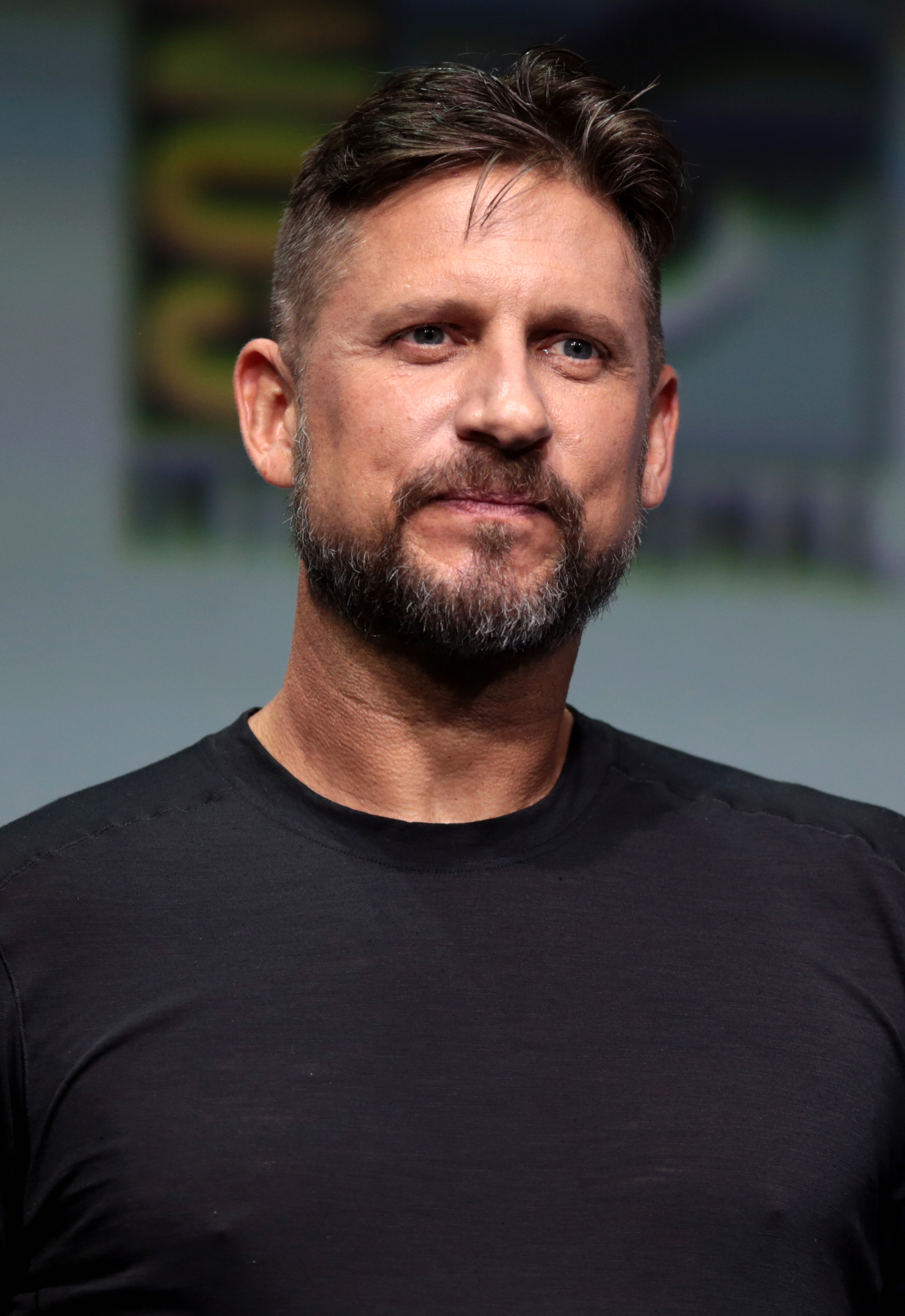
David Ayer was initially set to return as director from the first Suicide Squad, but chose to work on other projects.

Before the first Suicide Squad film was released in August 2016, director David Ayer and star Will Smith were expected to return for a sequel. Filming was planned to begin in 2017 after the pair completed their work on the film Bright (2017). Karen Fukuhara expressed her interest in fleshing out Tatsu Yamashiro / Katana's backstory in a sequel, though she also noted that if not, that could be in a spin-off film of her own. In September, Ayer said the first film had been rated PG-13 because it had originally been envisioned that way by the studio and an R-rating needed to be planned from the start of a production. He said that it would be worth "lobbying" to make a sequel R-rated, as he felt the first film had the "edge" and "attitude" of an R-rated film already. Suicide Squad was released to a polarized response and was reported to have a difficult production, but the film grossed enough for Warner Bros. Pictures to fast-track development of a sequel. Several spin-off films were also in development by December, including one featuring Smith as Deadshot. The project that was furthest along was Gotham City Sirens, an all-female team-up film with Margot Robbie planned to reprise her role as Harley Quinn. Ayer was set to direct and produce that film rather than Suicide Squad 2.

Warner Bros. began searching for a new director for Suicide Squad 2 and was courting Mel Gibson by mid-February 2017. Ruben Fleischer, Daniel Espinosa, Jonathan Levine and David S. Goyer were also considered. Adam Cozad entered negotiations to write the film a month later, at which point there was still no director attached to the project. It was described as being a priority for Warner Bros. Script delays led to the planned filming start being pushed to mid-2018, at which point Gibson moved on from the project. Jaume Collet-Serra became the new frontrunner to direct in early July, by which time both Smith and Robbie were set to reprise their roles. Zak Penn had pitched a new story treatment for the film to Warner Bros., and wrote a draft of the script as a favor to the studio. Later in July, Collet-Serra was hired to direct The Walt Disney Company's Jungle Cruise (2021) and withdrew from directing Suicide Squad 2 after deciding he would rather originate a new story than continue an existing franchise; Collet-Serra went on to direct the DC Extended Universe (DCEU) film Black Adam (2022).

In August, Jared Leto was expected to reprise his role as the Joker from the first film, while production was not expected to begin until Smith completed his work on Aladdin (2019) and Gemini Man (2019) in late 2018. The next month, Gavin O'Connor was chosen to direct the film and co-write it with his writing partner Anthony Tambakis, based on his own vision. The character Black Adam was reportedly the main villain of O'Connor's script, with Dwayne Johnson already attached to that role for DC Films. Michael De Luca joined the film as a producer in January 2018, working with the first film's producer Charles Roven. David Bar Katz and Todd Stashwick were co-writing the film with O'Connor in June, and they had completed their draft by that September. O'Connor left the film by early October to focus on The Way Back (2020). This was reportedly out of frustration that Warner Bros. was already moving ahead with Birds of Prey (2020), a new Harley Quinn spin-off film with a similar story to the one he wrote for Suicide Squad 2. Years later while promoting The Accountant 2 (2025), O'Connor clarified that he had written three-quarters of a screenplay that focused on a "father-daughter story" between Deadshot and his daughter Zoe when a new regime was established in DC and the filmmakers he was working with were replaced. Upon meeting new president Walter Hamada, he and his writing partner told him to wait until they finished the script to show it to him, but once they did a couple of weeks later, Hamada asked them to make it a comedy, which they declined because that was not what O'Connor agreed to do for the studio, so he ultimately left. During the development process, the character Deathstroke appeared in four or five different versions of the script to fight Deadshot. Joe Manganiello was attached to reprise his role as Deathstroke from Justice League (2017), but his agent constantly informed him about the director changes until telling him that the film would be stand-alone, so the experience left him feeling that he would never portray the character again until he was asked to return for Zack Snyder's Justice League (2021).

==== James Gunn ====
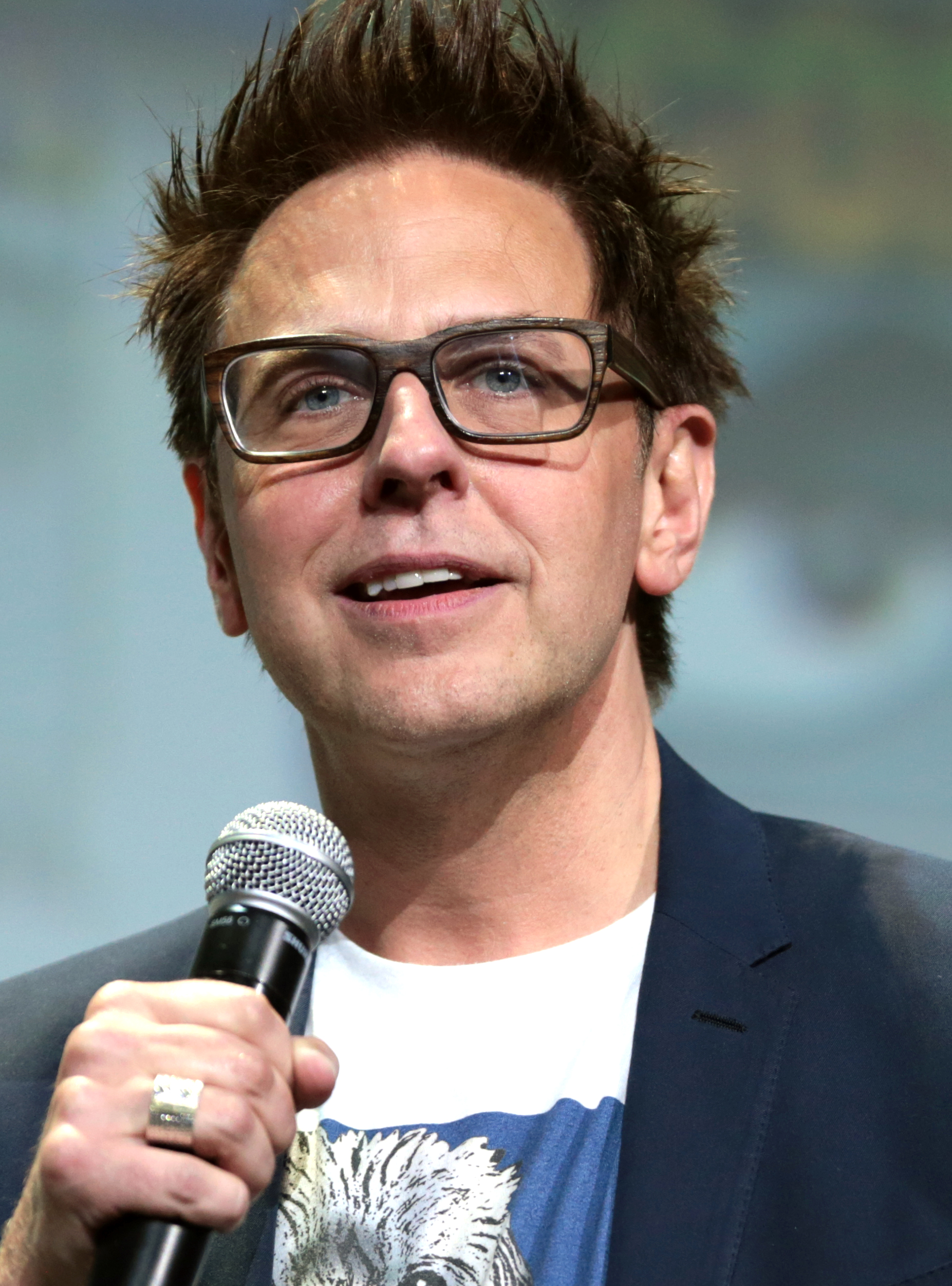
James Gunn, writer and director of The Suicide Squad

In October 2018, James Gunn was hired to write and possibly direct the next Suicide Squad film. His deal with Warner Bros. closed following the completion of his exit settlement with the Walt Disney Company, after he was dismissed by Disney and Marvel Studios as director of the Marvel Cinematic Universe (MCU) film Guardians of the Galaxy Vol. 3 (2023) in July 2018 when conservative commentators, such as Mike Cernovich, circulated controversial Twitter posts he made involving rape, pedophilia, AIDS, the Holocaust, bestiality and the September 11 attacks. Warner Bros. had been interested in recruiting Gunn for the DCEU immediately after his dismissal by Disney and asked him to make a new Superman film with an offer to recast Henry Cavill in the role. Gunn was uncertain if he wanted to take on Superman, so Warner Bros. told him that he could adapt any DC property he liked. He chose to make a Suicide Squad film, recalling that it was the one DC property he dreamed of adapting and had been jealous when Ayer's Suicide Squad film performed well. Ayer supported Gunn's hiring as a "brave and smart move" and called him "the right man for the job". Dave Bautista, who starred in the Guardians of the Galaxy films for Gunn, expressed interest in appearing in his Suicide Squad film.

One of the first things Gunn did when discussing the film with Warner Bros. was watch Suicide Squad for the first time. The studio said he could take or leave any elements he wanted from the first film, but they hoped that he would bring back Robbie as Harley Quinn. The day after he was hired, Disney decided to reinstate Gunn as director of Guardians of the Galaxy Vol. 3. He discussed his new DCEU commitment with Marvel Studios President Kevin Feige, who encouraged him to "make a great movie" and agreed to delay production on Guardians until Gunn had completed work on the Suicide Squad sequel. In January 2019, the film was officially titled The Suicide Squad and was scheduled for release on August 6, 2021. The title was suggested by Gunn as a joke, but executives at Warner Bros. liked it. At that time, Gunn was in negotiations to direct the film which was described as a relaunch rather than a direct sequel that would take the franchise in a new direction and feature a largely new cast. Roven and Peter Safran were set as producers, with Zack Snyder and Deborah Snyder as executive producers. Safran, who produced the DCEU films Aquaman (2018) and Shazam! (2019), had pushed Gunn to take on the project and felt there was no better director to "bring together a disparate group of outsiders on a mission".

=== Writing ===
We really wanted to make sure that this stands on its own two feet. So... it's not a sequel, but there are some characters that were in the first movie, right? So it's not really a full reboot either. So we just call it James Gunn's The Suicide Squad.

— Producer Peter Safran on the relationship between The Suicide Squad and the first Suicide Squad film

Gunn wrote a treatment that was a few pages long, and then quickly produced several drafts of the script that Warner Bros. was "extremely high" on. He said the film was "its own thing", rather than a sequel or reboot; it does not explicitly address the events of the first film or Birds of Prey, but it also does not contradict them. Warner Bros. asked Gunn to make the film PG-13, but he insisted on it being R-rated if he was going to direct it; the studio felt Gunn's involvement was "worth the trade-off" for the higher rating. He took inspiration from John Ostrander's original 1980s run on the Suicide Squad comic books, which he was drawn to because it was about a "bunch of loser, B-grade supervillains". Safran described The Suicide Squad as a "gritty 1970s war movie combined with the brilliance of James Gunn's characters and comedy", and Gunn was influenced by war films such as The Great Escape (1963), The Dirty Dozen (1967), Where Eagles Dare (1968) and Kelly's Heroes (1970).

Already knowing the kind of story that he wanted to tell, Gunn's first step in writing the film was picking the characters for the Suicide Squad roster. He spent days going through the library of existing DC Comics characters and deciding which group would work well together. He wanted to create a blend of characters by having each feel like they were part of a different film genre. The first new character that Gunn added to the roster was King Shark, who was intended to appear in the first film before being replaced by Killer Croc. Gunn sought to feature an animal on the team and chose King Shark because he enjoyed the concept of a man-eating fish-human hybrid. Other new characters that Gunn added include Polka-Dot Man, Peacemaker and a female version of Ratcatcher. He said one of the main differences between this film and the Guardians of the Galaxy films was that it would be unclear whether some Suicide Squad members would turn out to be good or bad, unlike the Guardians of the Galaxy who are portrayed as heroes despite their flaws. Characters that were considered but ultimately rejected include Sportsmaster, Dogwelder, Bat-Mite, Livewire, Punch and Jewelee, Black Spider, Deathstroke, Man-Bat, Plastique, Chemo, KGBeast, Solomon Grundy, Rainbow Creature, Gunhawk, Knockout, Killer Frost, Mr. Freeze, and Yahya Abdul-Mateen II's Black Manta from Aquaman. He did not consider using the Joker because he felt Amanda Waller would not have any use for the character, and chose not to use Kite Man because he felt the character was already a punchline in the comics and would not feel fresh for the film. Gunn also avoided characters like Bronze Tiger and Katana since they are antiheroes rather than villains.

Gunn felt he was in a position, and had the responsibility, to take risks with the property and try make "an all-out entertaining film from start to finish that didn't play by the rules". This included "post-modern" aesthetic decisions such as creating sequences that showed the perspectives of Harley Quinn and Polka-Dot Man, adding an extended subplot where Harley Quinn is on her own away from the action and adding title cards that segue between sequences. These elements were written into the script, including what Gunn referred to as "Harley-vision" where gory murders are depicted through Harley's "starry-eyed way of looking at life" by mixing "hearts and beautiful little things" with the blood that is coming out of the people Harley is killing. The "Harley-vision" visuals were inspired by Lollipop Chainsaw (2012), a video game that Gunn helped develop.

The main villains of the film are Amanda Waller and the U.S. government, who are trying to cover up their involvement in illegal experiments on the island of Corto Maltese. Gunn did not feel that this storyline was specifically critical of the U.S. government, just realistic given the real-world history of the U.S. interfering in other countries. He also wanted to use this to make dramatic points rather than political ones, with the different stances on the government's actions that the film's main characters take leading to dramatic conflict. For the antagonist that Waller sends the Suicide Squad to fight, Gunn initially considered using Superman before deciding to feature Starro the Conqueror instead. He found the character to be both ridiculous and terrifying, which reflected what he was trying to accomplish with the film, and he felt Starro was the only major DC Comics villain that was unlikely to appear in another live-action film or who would not be adapted faithfully by another filmmaker if it was. He also wanted to avoid potential questions regarding who should be portraying Superman in the DCEU and what that would mean for the film's connections to the wider shared universe. DC allowed Gunn to kill any character, including Harley Quinn, and he ignored the potential backlash from doing this to prioritize the natural evolution of the story. He did not want it to be like other films which might kill off some characters early on but then not kill any of the main characters at the end, so he knew that one of the Suicide Squad members would die during the final battle. He originally intended for this to be Ratcatcher, but ultimately felt that this would be too heartless. He chose Polka-Dot Man instead because he thought the character had the most complete story arc at that point in the film.

=== Casting ===
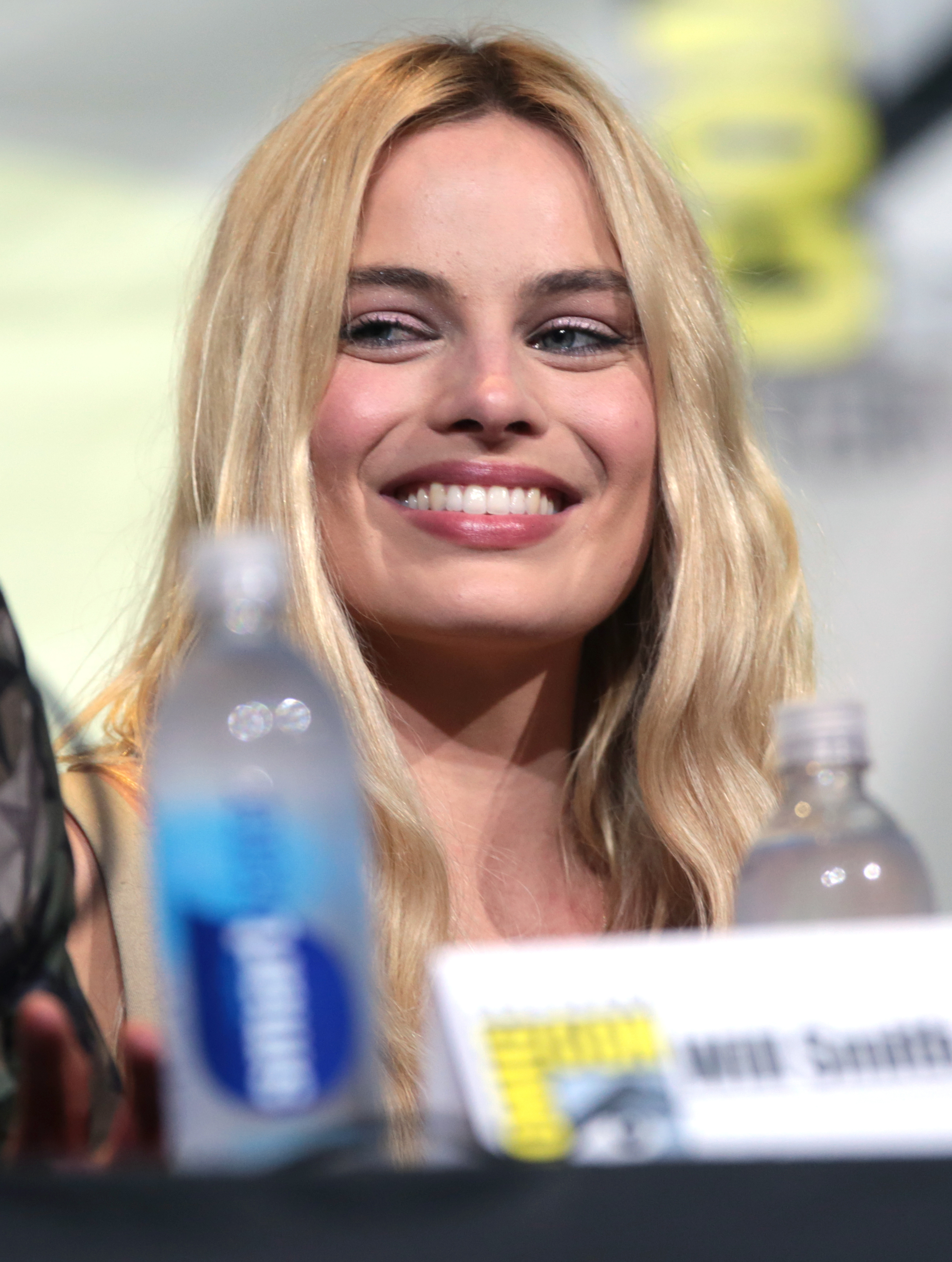
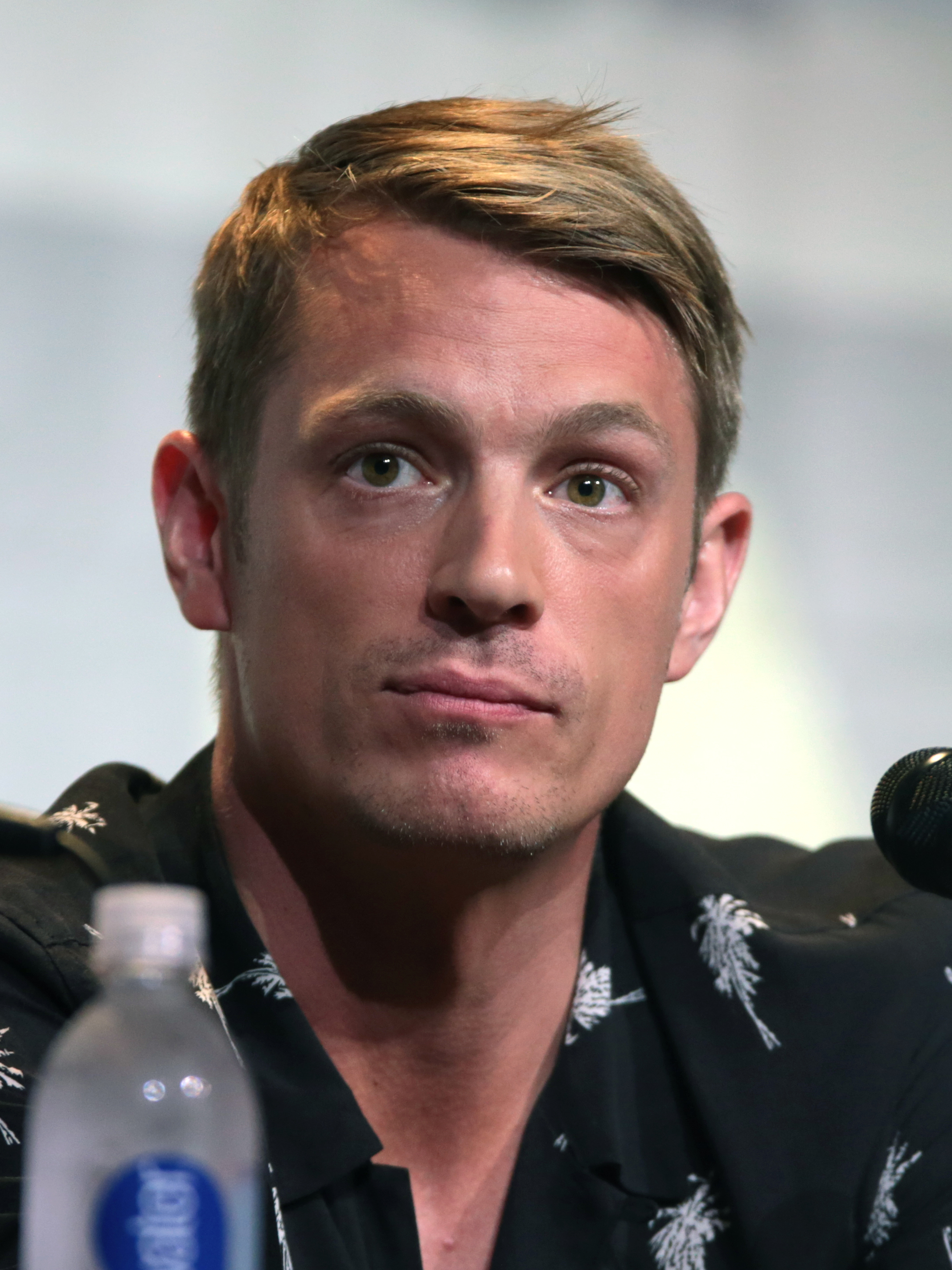
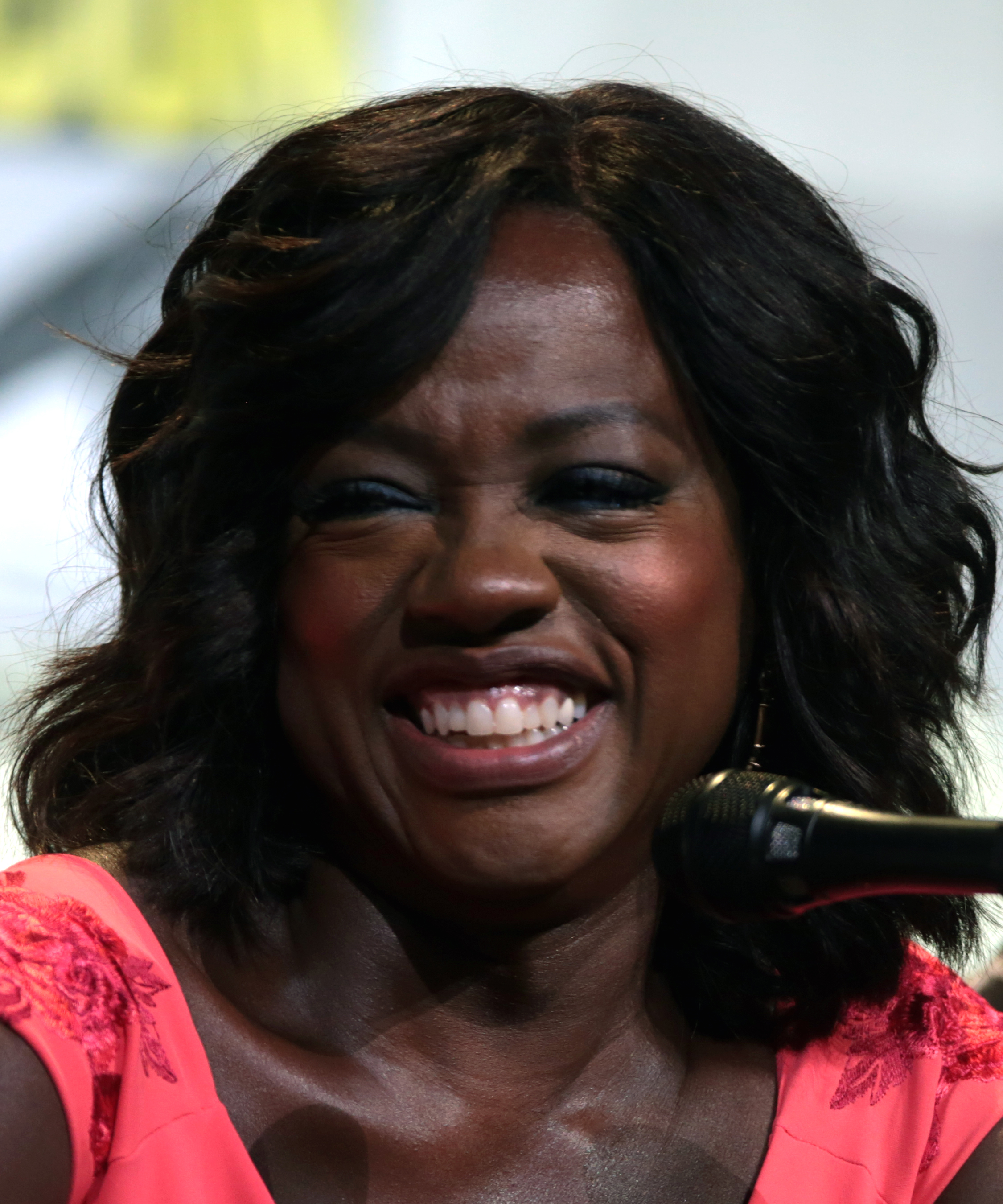
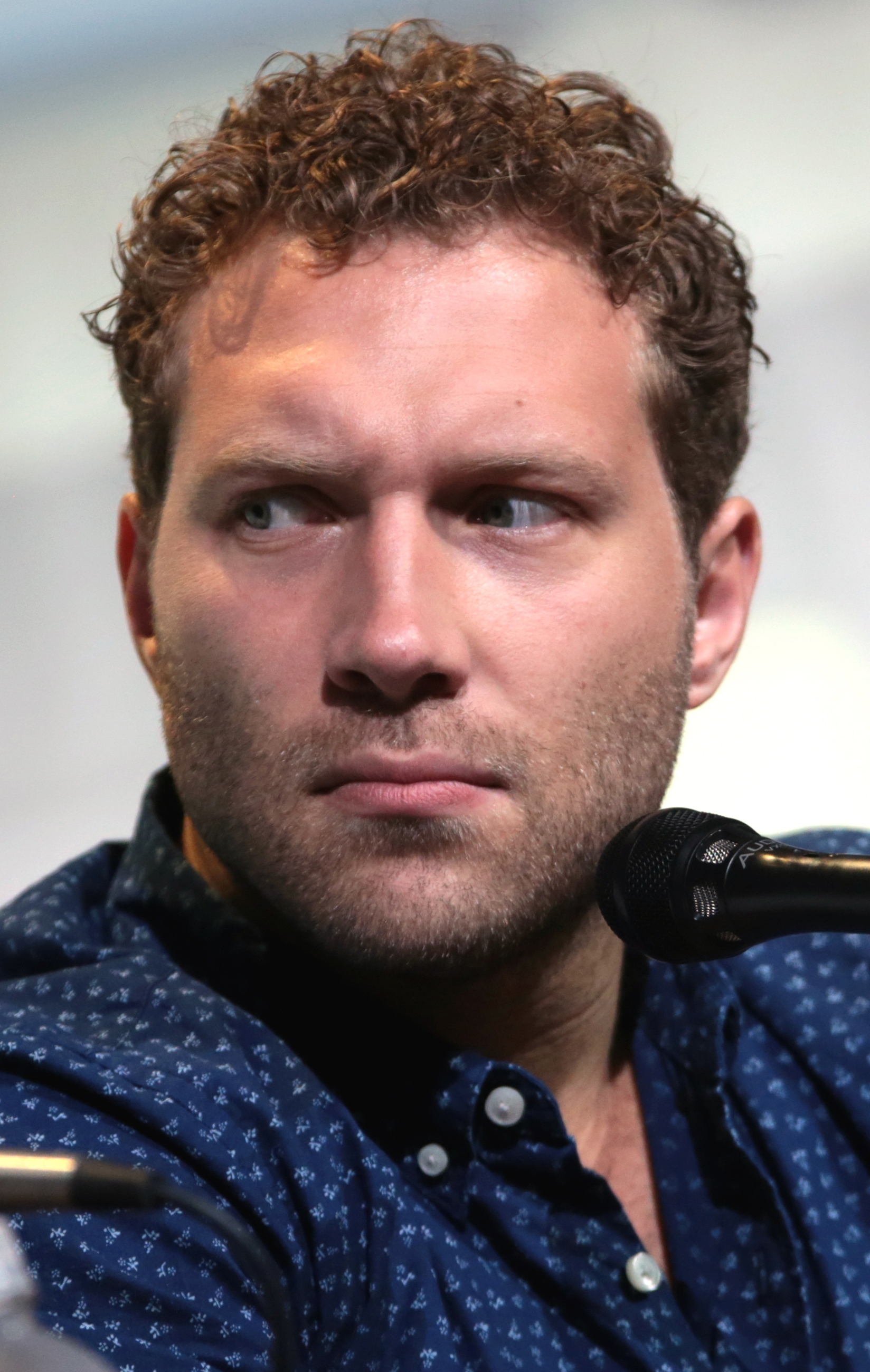
Reprising their roles from the first Suicide Squad film are Margot Robbie as Harley Quinn, Joel Kinnaman as Colonel Rick Flag, Viola Davis as Amanda Waller and Jai Courtney as Captain Boomerang.

When acknowledging the first film's negative reception, Gunn said there were aspects of it that he loved and defended Ayer's casting choices; the first decision Gunn made on the new film was to bring back Robbie as Harley Quinn and Viola Davis as Amanda Waller. On February 27, 2019, Smith was revealed to no longer be in the film's cast due to scheduling issues. On March 1, Gunn met with Idris Elba to discuss him joining the film, reportedly as a replacement for Smith as Deadshot. Elba was Gunn's only choice for the role, and he wrote the script with Elba in mind—something Gunn rarely does for actors he has not met. Elba agreed to join the film during that conversation, as he wanted to work with Gunn and felt "so touched and honored that someone of [Gunn's] talent was really keen to work with" him. Elba was in official negotiations the next week. Joel Kinnaman's Rick Flag was expected to return from the first film at that point, and Jai Courtney revealed later that month that he was returning as Captain Boomerang from the first film. Scott Eastwood, who played GQ Edwards in the first film, was approached to reprise his role by Warner Bros. offering him a three-picture deal for more Suicide Squad movies, but the studio did not wish to pay him for those movies nor send him a script, leading Eastwood to be unaware of the plans he was signing up for; after seeking advice from his father Clint, Scott declined to return because he did not feel Warner really needed him back and was not answering his questions. In April, the film's creative team decided that Elba would play a new character rather than Deadshot. This decision was made, following weeks of discussions that included Gunn and Elba, to be respectful to Smith and allow him the option to return to the role in the future. Elba later stated that Gunn never intended to cast him as Deadshot, while Gunn said he changed his mind about who Elba would portray "a lot". Gunn ultimately chose to cast Elba as Bloodsport because he liked the character in the comics. Though the film has an ensemble cast, Gunn felt Bloodsport was the main protagonist due to being the most prominent and because of the amount of character growth that he goes through.

Gunn wrote King Shark with Sylvester Stallone in mind, but tested three other voice actors before asking Stallone to join the film. Stallone agreed to voice the character due to his experience working with Gunn on the MCU film Guardians of the Galaxy Vol. 2 (2017). Gunn wrote Peacemaker for Bautista, but the actor declined as he had a scheduling conflict with Zack Snyder's Army of the Dead (2021). John Cena entered talks for a role in the film that was believed to be Peacemaker in late April, as Gunn had wanted to work with Cena since seeing his performance in Trainwreck (2015). Cena made numerous unsuccessful attempts to join the DCEU prior to his casting in this film. David Dastmalchian and Daniela Melchior were respectively cast as Polka-Dot Man and Ratcatcher 2 at the end of April. Gunn said the role of Polka-Dot Man was "tailor made" for Dastmalchian, who had been friends with Gunn for a long time. In contrast, Melchior was cast from a group of 200 actors. She did a chemistry test with live rats as part of her audition process because her character controls rats in the film and had to interact with them on set. Gunn's frequent collaborator Michael Rooker was in talks to join the cast in May, while Storm Reid was cast as the daughter of Elba's character in July. Flula Borg, Nathan Fillion and Steve Agee joined the film in August, with Agee initially reported to be portraying King Shark. Also in August, Taika Waititi entered negotiations for a role. Peter Capaldi joined the cast in early September, when Pete Davidson was in talks to make a cameo appearance during a break from his work on Saturday Night Live. Davidson agreed to join the film because his character is called "Dick Hertz", which Davidson found to be funny. Maria Gabriela de Faría auditioned for a role in the film with self-tapes, but was left so "starstruck" by Gunn during her audition that, coupled with her poor English at the time, she did not understand his instructions about "acting like a brat" because she did not want him to think she could not speak English and did not perform the scene as he wanted, later Googling the word and finding out what it really meant. de Faría would later be cast as Angela Spica / The Engineer in Gunn's DC Universe (DCU) film Superman (2025).

A table read for the film with the full cast was held on September 11, ahead of the start of filming later that month. Gunn later announced the film's full main cast and characters: Dastmalchian as Polka-Dot Man, Cena as Peacemaker, Courtney as Captain Boomerang, Joaquín Cosío as Mateo Suarez, Fillion as T.D.K., Kinnaman as Rick Flag, Mayling Ng as Mongal, Borg as Javelin, Gunn's brother Sean Gunn as Weasel, Juan Diego Botto as Silvio Luna, Reid as Tyla, Davidson as Blackguard, Waititi as the first Ratcatcher, Alice Braga as Sol Soria, Agee, Tinashe Kajese as Flo Crawley, Melchior as Ratcatcher 2, Capaldi as Thinker, Julio Ruiz as Milton, Jennifer Holland as Emilia Harcourt, Davis as Waller, Elba as Bloodsport, Robbie as Quinn and Rooker as Savant. Agee was the on-set reference for King Shark, and also portrays John Economos.

=== Design ===
Production designer Beth Mickle said Gunn wanted the film to be "grey and drab and monotone" until the characters arrive in Corto Maltese, which he wanted to "explode with color" like Panama and Cuba. The design team took inspiration from photos of Havana, Cuba and São Paulo, Brazil. Gunn said the film featured the biggest sets ever built for a Warner Bros. film, with Mickle building a set the size of three football fields for the outside of Jötunheim where the final battle was filmed, and an even bigger beach set that had real waves and a palm tree forest which Gunn called "the greatest set [he had] ever been on". The jungle featured a bamboo cage that was 8 feet (2.4 m) deep. Gunn said building a whole beach was expensive, but it was more cost-effective than using a real beach due to changing tides and the limited amount of time available for filming in a real environment.

Because of the mixture of characters that Gunn selected for the film's Suicide Squad roster, there are "dorky comics costumes" alongside "modern, scary, grimdark" costumes. One of the biggest costume challenges for Gunn was creating Bloodsport's suit, from which the character can form various weapons. Robbie wears a new costume that features Harley's traditional red and black color palette, with Gunn taking inspiration from the character's costume in the video game Batman: Arkham City (2011). He wanted her jacket to have "motorcycle gang style"-writing on the back and chose "Live fast, die clown" over other potential options "Clown AF" and "World's Best Grandpa". Gunn also removed Harley's "Rotten" facial tattoo that she had in previous DCEU films because both he and Robbie disliked it. Flag wears a yellow T-shirt with a cartoon character called "Ultra Bunny" on it. Gunn drew the character and added the text "obstacles are opportunities" which is his slogan when directing on set. Gunn initially used a hammerhead shark design from the New 52 comics for King Shark, but found that it would be awkward to film the character with other actors due to his eyes being on the sides of his head. Gunn settled on a great white shark design that is similar to the one seen in the Harley Quinn animated series, though this was a coincidence as that series was released after filming for The Suicide Squad began. Gunn gave King Shark a dad bod to make him look less like a mammal, as well as small eyes, a big mouth and a small head to avoid the "cute anthropomorphic beast" design seen in popular characters like Baby Groot from Guardians of the Galaxy Vol. 2 and Grogu from The Mandalorian (2019–present).

=== Filming ===
Principal photography began on September 20, 2019, at Pinewood Atlanta Studios in Fayette County, Georgia, under the working title El Dorado. Henry Braham served as cinematographer, after previously doing so for Gunn's Guardians of the Galaxy Vol. 2. Feige and Marvel Studios co-president Louis D'Esposito visited the set during filming. Gunn took several precautions to try to avoid details about the film leaking, such as referring to Elba's character in the script and on set as "Vigilante" to prevent his actual role from being revealed and also not giving some of the actors script pages from after their characters' deaths.

Gunn extensively storyboards his films, but the opening shot of The Suicide Squad—in which the camera rotates out of a puddle's reflection on the ground to reveal Savant bouncing a ball—was a spontaneous decision that he made on set when he saw the reflections on the ground. For a scene where Bloodsport smokes a cigarette, Elba—who has asthma and does not smoke himself—was left with tears in his eyes that had to be removed digitally since Gunn otherwise liked the shot. Gunn said the film used more practical effects than any other blockbuster comic book film, with on-set special effects provided by Dan Sudick and prosthetics created by Legacy Effects. Gunn highlighted a shot in the film where King Shark, who is created with visual effects, rips a person in half, which was done practically using special effects and prosthetics. Stunt supervisor Guy Norris served as second unit director for the car scenes in the film. Gunn explained that he rarely uses second unit directors on his films and has never liked working with them, but he enjoyed the experience of working with Norris as he was not comfortable shooting with cars and had already known Norris for a long time.

Filming in Atlanta was expected to last three months before moving to Panama for a month, with Colón, Panama standing in for the streets of Corto Maltese. Gunn said the city was "beautiful but falling-apart... we were able to use all the colors but to keep the grime" as well. The cast and crew rescued several animals from the streets of Panama. Filming also took place in Porto, Portugal, and wrapped on February 28, 2020.

=== Editing ===
Fred Raskin and Christian Wagner served as editors on the film. Raskin previously collaborated alongside Gunn on Guardians of the Galaxy (2014) and Guardians of the Galaxy Vol. 2. By April 2020, Gunn was editing the film at his home due to the COVID-19 pandemic, which he said had not affected post-production or the release schedule at that time. The initial assembly cut for the film was around two hours and forty minutes long and around twenty minutes of that was soon cut down during editing. Gunn felt the film was still too long and removed some elements such as part of Harley Quinn's separate storyline that he felt was "pushing audiences away a little bit too much", as well as a sequence with Ratcatcher, King Shark, Polka-Dot Man and the Thinker when they exit a Corto Maltese bar. Gunn felt the latter was "pretty dynamite stuff" but it was slowing down the film and at the wrong time. A smaller scene that was cut involved Waller's aide Flo Crawley being arrested for knocking Waller out during the final battle; Gunn explained that this was a mostly unnecessary detail which made the audience feel uncomfortable since it felt less like the villain, Waller, had lost, but he included the moment in a recap of the film that begins the spin-off series Peacemaker to explain why Crawley is not in that series. In December, Gunn said editing for the film's final cut had been completed and work on the remaining visual effects, sound and score was continuing. The final runtime is two hours and twelve minutes.

=== Visual effects ===
Kelvin McIlwain was the visual effects supervisor for the film, with visual effects vendors including Framestore, Weta Digital, Trixter, Scanline VFX and Cantina Creative. Gunn said the visual effects for King Shark, primarily handled by Framestore and Weta Digital, were particularly difficult to get right.

=== Music ===
In May 2020, John Murphy was set as the composer for the film. Tyler Bates, who scored all of Gunn's previous films, was originally attached to compose the score for The Suicide Squad but eventually left the project. During pre-production, Bates wrote music for Gunn to use on set as he had previously done for Gunn on the Guardians of the Galaxy films. The single "Rain" by grandson and Jessie Reyez from the film's soundtrack album was released on June 22, 2021, with the artists also expected to contribute songs individually to the album. A single from Murphy's score, "So This Is The Famous Suicide Squad", was made available on July 8. On August 6, two full albums for the film were released by WaterTower Music: one featuring Murphy's score and a soundtrack album featuring songs from the film, including "Rain".

=== Completion ===
In January 2021, at the beginning of filming for Peacemaker in Vancouver, Canada, Gunn filmed a post-credits scene for The Suicide Squad that sets up the series. He had not planned an alternative post-credits scene before deciding to make Peacemaker. A month later, the film was fully finished. Gunn said Warner Bros. had not interfered with his vision for the film and had only given a few minor notes. He added that The Suicide Squad was the most fun he had making a film, which he attributed to prioritizing creativity over perfectionism, being in the best place mentally and emotionally of his career, having a "stupendous" cast and crew and supportive studio and feeling that he was at the height of his directing abilities with the film. It came in under budget and had no days of additional photography. In July, the film's release date was moved up by a day to August 5.

== Marketing ==
A behind-the-scenes featurette was released on August 22, 2020, during the virtual DC FanDome event. A panel for the film was held during Comic Con Experience's digital event CCXP Worlds on December 6, with James Gunn and members of the cast in attendance. The cast members discussed their characters, and a design for Elba's costume as Bloodsport was revealed. Cena decided to wear the Peacemaker costume for interviews and other promotional events as a way to familiarize the audience with the lesser-known character, which was a tactic that he had previously used when he was a professional wrestler.

The film's first trailer was released on March 26, 2021, with Alex McLevy of The A.V. Club praising its jokes and action. He felt everything about the trailer perfectly captured the Suicide Squad's inherent "outlandish fun" from the comics. Anthony D'Alessandro at Deadline Hollywood felt the trailer had all the trademarks of Gunn's Guardians of the Galaxy films, noting the use of a "retro hit single" in Steely Dan's "Dirty Work", with The Verge's Jay Peters also getting "some serious Guardians of the Galaxy vibes" from the trailer. D'Alessandro and Peters both compared it to the recently released DC film Zack Snyder's Justice League and noted how the trailer was much more colorful and humorous than that film. McLevy, Jennifer Bisset and Sean Keane of CNET, and CinemaBlend's Sean O'Connell all highlighted King Shark and his R-rated scenes. The trailer was viewed 150 million times within a week of its release, breaking the record for red band trailers that was established earlier in the year by the trailer for Mortal Kombat (2021).

A green band trailer was released online on April Fool's Day, after debuting in front of theatrical screenings of Godzilla vs. Kong (2021). It features new footage because Gunn did not want to use an edited version of the red band trailer as is usually done. Jennifer Ouellette at Ars Technica noted that the new trailer had a darker, more ominous tone than the red band version, without the jokes and King Shark scenes and with added character beats. Another trailer was released on June 22 by the main cast of the film in a marketing stunt where they pretended that they were leaking the trailer early. Gunn and Warner Bros. also joked about the trailer's "early release". The trailer features the song "Rain" by grandson and Jessie Reyez from the film's soundtrack album. Footage from the film is included in the music video for "Rain", which was released the next month.

== Release ==
=== Theatrical and streaming ===
The Suicide Squad premiered theatrically in the United Kingdom on July 30, 2021. It was scheduled to debut in the United States on August 6, but was moved up a day to August 5, for early preview screenings. The film was also made available on the streaming service HBO Max on August 5, for a one-month premiere streaming window. This was done as part of Warner Bros.'s joint theatrical and streaming release strategy for 2021 films that was announced in December 2020 amid the COVID-19 pandemic. Reflecting on this release strategy in January 2022, Gunn acknowledged suggestions that it negatively impacted on the film's box office performance and said the approach was not ideal for the film. He added that the film was widely pirated following its streaming debut, with a high quality version of the film appearing on piracy websites almost immediately after it was released on HBO Max. Internet technology company Akamai reported, based on global unlicensed streaming and torrent data, that The Suicide Squad was the sixth most pirated film between January and September 2021. Despite this, Gunn was grateful that people had been able to see the film online during the pandemic and that it had otherwise been well received.

=== Home media ===
The film was made available for digital purchase and rental on September 17, 2021, after leaving its HBO Max same day premiere window. The Suicide Squad was then released on DVD, Blu-ray, and Ultra HD Blu-ray on October 26, with special features including a commentary by Gunn, deleted and extended scenes, a gag reel, three retro style trailers, breakdowns of key scenes from the film, and several making-of featurettes. The film was the top-seller for home media sales in the United States for two weeks after its release, on both the NPD Videoscan First Alert chart (which tracks combined Blu-ray and DVD sales) and the dedicated Blu-ray sales chart. According to The Numbers, it sold a combined 146,752 Blu-ray and DVD units in its first week for a total of $3.8 million. It was the fourth highest-selling title for the month of October on the VideoScan First Alert chart.

== Reception ==
=== Box office ===
The Suicide Squad grossed $55.8 million in the United States and Canada, and $112.9 million in other territories, for a worldwide total of $168.7 million, against a production budget of $185 million.

In the United States and Canada, the film made $12.2 million on its first day, including $4.1 million from Thursday night previews, which was the biggest first day for an R-rated film during the pandemic. That contributed to $26.2 million (47.0% of total gross) across the film's opening weekend, which was also the biggest for an R-rated film during the pandemic. The film dropped 72% in its second weekend, finishing fifth with just $7.5 million. This drop was similar to those seen in the second weekends of other films released simultaneously in theaters and on HBO Max, such as Space Jam: A New Legacy (2021). It dropped 55% in its third weekend, grossing $3.4 million, before crossing $50 million in its fourth weekend with an additional $2 million.

The week prior to its domestic release, the film made $6.7 million from five countries, including $4.5 million in the United Kingdom and $1.6 million in France. The Suicide Squad expanded to 69 countries, covering all major markets except Japan, in its second week of international release. It made $35 million, finishing first in Russia ($4.2 million), Mexico ($2 million), Brazil ($1.4 million), Spain ($1.3 million), and Italy ($1 million), and only dropped 25% in markets that it opened in the previous week. The film opened at number one in Japan the following week with $1.9 million, retained first position in Brazil, and moved to first in Australia as well. Overall, the weekend total was $17 million, down 50% from the previous week and behind new release Free Guy in many markets. The film added $8.7 million in its fourth international weekend, before passing $100 million internationally the next week with an additional $4.6 million. The United Kingdom, Russia, France, Germany, and Mexico were the leading markets for the film outside of the U.S. and Canada.

The film's box office underperformance was generally attributed to its release during the COVID-19 pandemic, the fact that it was also available for streaming on HBO Max at the same time as its theatrical release, piracy allowed by the streaming release, the R-rating which limited younger audiences, the poor reception to the first Suicide Squad, and confusion from general audiences over its relationship to the first film caused by their similar titles. Anthony D'Alessandro of Deadline Hollywood felt the HBO Max availability and feelings about the first film outweighed the impacts of the pandemic, and noted that other films had made significantly more money at the box office in recent weeks. Writing for Forbes, Scott Mendelson felt that general audiences would not be compelled by Gunn's involvement and instead would see the film as a sequel without the main draws of the first film, such as Will Smith. Mendelson added that the film's $185 million budget was an "absurd amount to spend" on an R-rated film and was significantly more than what was spent on previous R-rated superhero films. He said the film required a "best-case-scenario box office" just to break even with that budget, and that did not turn out to be the case.

=== Streaming viewership ===
HBO Max reported that The Suicide Squad had the second-biggest opening weekend of all the films that premiered simultaneously on the streaming service and in theaters. The service did not provide further details or data, but analytics company Samba TV, which gathers viewership data from certain Smart TVs and content providers, reported that 2.8 million U.S. households watched the film over its first four days of release on HBO Max, which placed it only behind Mortal Kombat (3.8 million) for simultaneous theater and streaming releases. Also according to Samba TV, The Suicide Squad had the biggest HBO Max debut for a DC film, ahead of both Wonder Woman 1984 (2.2 million) and Zack Snyder's Justice League (1.8 million). While discussing Nielsen Media Research's streaming ratings—which HBO Max does not participate in—for the week of the film's release, Forbes's Scott Mendelson estimated that around 369 million minutes of the film had been viewed based on Samba TV's figures, which would have placed it third on Nielsen's list of top streaming films for the week behind Netflix's Vivo (493 million minutes) and Disney+'s Jungle Cruise (407 million minutes).

Samba TV later reported that 3.5 million American households had watched the film within its first week of release. This grew to 4.7 million for the first 17 days, which placed it third after Mortal Kombat (5.5 million) and Godzilla vs. Kong (5.1 million). These rankings remained the same for Samba TV's 30-day figures, which reported 5.1 million households having viewed The Suicide Squad in that time. According to Whip Media, who track viewership data for the 19 million worldwide users of their TV Time app, The Suicide Squad was the seventh-most-streamed-film of 2021 and the most-streamed-project of the year for HBO Max.

=== Critical response ===
On Rotten Tomatoes, The Suicide Squad holds an approval rating of 90% based on 384 reviews, with an average score of 7.5/10. The site's critical consensus reads, "Enlivened by writer-director James Gunn's singularly skewed vision, The Suicide Squad marks a funny, fast-paced rebound that plays to the source material's violent, anarchic strengths." On Metacritic, the film has a weighted average score of 72 out of 100, based on 55 critics, indicating "generally favorable" reviews. Audiences polled by CinemaScore gave the film an average grade of "B+" on an A+ to F scale, the same score that the first film and Birds of Prey received, while PostTrak reported that 83% of audience members gave it a positive score compared to 73% for the first film. 62% told PostTrak that they would definitely recommend the film.

Reviewing for The A.V. Club, Katie Rife gave the film a "B+" grade and said, "Now that superhero movies have gone from disreputable entertainment for children to global events ushered in with awed reverence, it was time for someone to come along and pop the balloon. Pulpy and outrageous, irreverent and ultraviolent, The Suicide Squad does so with a smile." Writing for Variety, Owen Gleiberman called the film what "the first Suicide Squad should have been" and said that "The Suicide Squad comes sizzlingly alive as all-cylinders comic-book moviemaking. There's a frowsy destructive joy to the staging". Clarisse Loughrey of The Independent also praised the film and considered it an improvement over Suicide Squad, writing "Gunn's distinct and self-assured vision, which he's said was left untouched and unbothered by studio interference, puts The Suicide Squad alongside the very best of modern comic-book filmmaking. His film, which now comes with an all-important 'The' at the beginning of its title, functions both as a sequel and a fresh start." Brian Truitt of USA Today gave the film 3.5 stars out of 4 and said "The Suicide Squad shifts superhero movies into a hilarious, gory and exceedingly bonkers new direction but writer/director James Gunn still makes time to show one goofy supervillain making sure another's buckled up for a plane ride headed for certain doom" and also said that the film "is a bloody marvel that blows up the superhero genre."

Justin Chang from Los Angeles Times stated: "After 2016's ugly, bludgeoning Suicide Squad, I couldn't imagine liking—and could barely stomach the idea of seeing—another movie called Suicide Squad. I'm delighted to be proven wrong", and called the film "redemption for James Gunn and DC". Richard Trenholm of CNET gave the film a positive review and praised it for its themes, writing "This irreverent comic book movie takes shots at very big and serious themes, raging against Western imperialism, American foreign policy and government deception as it indicts interference in foreign countries. Representing this chilling bureaucratic evil, Amanda Waller emerges as perhaps the most hateful villain in the DC universe — certainly the coldest". Alonso Duralde of the TheWrap wrote: "The Suicide Squad is by no means perfect, but like the Deadpool movies, it's a showcase for what can happen when a superhero movie is allowed to be sprightly, self-aware, and sardonic while also indulging in hard-R violence, gore, and language. Gunn's latest creation is not without moments that drag, but when it pops, it pops brilliantly". Entertainment Weekly's Leah Greenblatt gave the film a C+ grade and wrote: "The script, accordingly, herks and jerks along with a sort of forced-festive glee, its mounting body count buffeted by goofball banter and pounding soundtrack cues. A good half of the jokes don't land, but unlike his predecessor's joyless slog, Gunn's version at least celebrates the nonsense." Peter Bradshaw of The Guardian gave the film 3 out of 5 stars, and called it "a long, loud, often enjoyable and amusing film that blitzes your eyeballs and eardrums and covers all the bases". Eric Kohn of IndieWire described the film as a reminder of the United States' historical interventions in Latin America.

=== Themes and analysis ===
Some critics have interpreted The Suicide Squad as a critique and even a parody of American foreign policy and noted some anti-imperialist themes, which was arguably done in greater extent than the film's predecessor. Noah Berlatsky of Foreign Policy compares the rationale of the Suicide Squad's intervention in the Corto Maltese civil war to the 2003 invasion of Iraq on the grounds of an anti-American regime purportedly gaining access to and weaponizing a destructive force such as Starro. He also notes that American interference in Corto Maltese is "as every bit as disastrous as the 2003 Iraq invasion," also commenting that The Suicide Squad depicts the U.S. government as "bumbling" and "corrupt", citing the squad's accidental slaughter of the very fighters they were supposed to protect and Amanda Waller's desire to cover up America's role in Project Starfish and ambivalence towards Starro's rampage. Reuben Baron of Comic Book Resources compares the torture and experimentation of Corto Maltese civilians in Project Starfish to the Abu Ghraib torture and prisoner abuse scandal and allegations of prisoner torture at Guantanamo Bay detention camp. He opines that the evil actions of Silvio Luna's regime and Starro, while heinous, are "just symptomatic of the ultimate villain of The Suicide Squad: the United States government," describing Peacemaker's betrayal of the team as "misguided patriotism", and that the "heroes in this movie are those who are willing to defy the orders given to them by the government". Lucy Nichols of Counter Fire writes that the film "bizarrely, openly critiques American imperialism in Latin America", and like Baron, comments that The Suicide Squad is unusual among superhero films with its direct criticism of the U.S. government and military.

=== Accolades ===
Accolades received by The Suicide Squad (film)
Award	Date of ceremony	Category	Recipient(s)	Result	Ref.
Annie Awards	February 26, 2022	Best Character Animation – Live Action	Thomas Becker, Daniel Cavalcante, Philipp Winterstein, Victor Dinis, and Thiago Martins	Nominated	
Costume Designers Guild Awards	March 9, 2022	Excellence in Sci-Fi/Fantasy Film	Judianna Makovsky	Nominated	
Critics' Choice Super Awards	March 17, 2022	Best Superhero Movie	The Suicide Squad	Nominated	
Critics' Choice Super Awards	March 17, 2022	Best Actor in a Superhero Movie	John Cena	Nominated	
Critics' Choice Super Awards	March 17, 2022	Best Actor in a Superhero Movie	Idris Elba	Nominated	
Critics' Choice Super Awards	March 17, 2022	Best Actress in a Superhero Movie	Margot Robbie	Nominated	
Georgia Film Critics Association Awards	January 14, 2022	Oglethorpe Award for Excellence in Georgia Cinema	James Gunn	Nominated	
Golden Trailer Awards	July 22, 2021	Best Summer 2021 Blockbuster Trailer	"No Problemo" (BOND)	Nominated	
Golden Trailer Awards	July 22, 2021	Best Summer 2021 Blockbuster Trailer	"Rebellion" (Mob-Scene)	Nominated	
Golden Trailer Awards	October 6, 2022	Best International Poster	The Suicide Squad (WORKS ADV)	Won	
Hollywood Critics Association Awards	February 28, 2022	Best Action Film	The Suicide Squad	Nominated	
Hollywood Critics Association Awards	February 28, 2022	Best Animated or VSX Performance	Sylvester Stallone	Nominated	
Hollywood Critics Association Awards	February 28, 2022	Best Visual Effects	Jonathan Fawkner, Kelvin McIlwain, Dan Sudick, and Guy Williams	Nominated	
Hollywood Music in Media Awards	November 17, 2021	Best Original Score in a Sci-Fi/Fantasy Film	John Murphy	Nominated	
Make-Up Artists and Hair Stylists Guild Awards	February 19, 2022	Best Contemporary Make-Up	Heba Thorisdottir, Greg Funk, Sabrina Wilson, and Jillian Erickson	Nominated	
Make-Up Artists and Hair Stylists Guild Awards	February 19, 2022	Best Special Make-Up Effects	Shane Mahan, Brian Sipe, Matt Sprunger, Greg Funk	Nominated	
Make-Up Artists and Hair Stylists Guild Awards	February 19, 2022	Best Contemporary Hair Styling	Janine Rath-Thompson, Michelle Diamantides, Melizah Wheat, Kristen Saia	Nominated	
People's Choice Awards	December 7, 2021	The Female Movie Star of 2021	Margot Robbie	Nominated	
Satellite Awards	April 2, 2022	Best Visual Effects	Jonathan Fawkner, Kelvin McIlwain, Dan Sudick, and Guy Williams	Nominated	
Satellite Awards	April 2, 2022	Stunt Performance Award	The Suicide Squad	Won	
Saturn Awards	October 25, 2022	Best Superhero Film	The Suicide Squad	Nominated	
Saturn Awards	October 25, 2022	Best Actor in a Film	Idris Elba	Nominated	
Saturn Awards	October 25, 2022	Best Supporting Actress in a Film	Viola Davis	Nominated	
Saturn Awards	October 25, 2022	Best Film Make-up	Heba Thorisdottir, Greg Funk, and Brian Sipe	Nominated	
Visual Effects Society Awards	March 8, 2022	Outstanding Created Environment in a Photoreal Feature	Nick Cattell, Jason Desjarlais, Matt Fitzgerald, and Jerome Moo for Valle Del Marre	Nominated	
Visual Effects Society Awards	March 8, 2022	Outstanding Model in a Photoreal or Animated Project	Simon Dean Morley, Cedric Enriquez Canlas, Layne Howe, and Alberto R. S. Hernandez for Jötunheim	Nominated	
Visual Effects Society Awards	March 8, 2022	Outstanding Effects Simulations in a Photoreal Feature	David R. Davies, Rogier Fransen, Sandy Sutherland, and Brandon James Fleet for Corto Maltese City Destruction	Nominated	

== Franchise ==
=== Spin-offs ===
Gunn began working on a spin-off series featuring Peacemaker while completing work on The Suicide Squad. In January 2021, Gunn said he had ideas for more television spin-offs beyond Peacemaker. DC Films president Walter Hamada said a month later that they had plans for more projects with Gunn, and Safran said there was potential for more spin-offs based on Suicide Squad members such as Ratcatcher and Bloodsport if a filmmaker had a unique vision for them. Gunn said in February that he did not necessarily intend to write and direct every The Suicide Squad spin-off, like he did for Peacemaker. In November 2022, Stallone said he would reprise his role as King Shark in the future.

==== Peacemaker season 1 ====
While completing work on The Suicide Squad during the COVID-19 pandemic, Gunn began writing a spin-off television series centered around Peacemaker. In September 2020, HBO Max ordered Peacemaker straight-to-series, with Gunn writing all eight episodes and directing five of them. Cena stars as Peacemaker, with Agee, Holland, and Davis also reprising their respective film roles. Gunn and Safran executive produce the series, which premiered in January 2022.

=== Unproduced sequel ===
In July 2021, Gunn said he had ideas for a sequel film that would go in a different direction from just assembling a new Suicide Squad team. In June 2022, Gunn said there had been discussions about a sequel to The Suicide Squad and he was considering it for his next feature film but his focus was on television for the foreseeable future following his positive experience making Peacemaker. The following June, Gunn said there would not be a sequel.

=== DC Universe ===
In October 2022, Gunn and co-producer Peter Safran were announced to be assuming roles as the dual CEOs and chairmen of the newly established DC Studios, placing them in supervision over all DC Comics-based media between film, television, animation and video games. Following the assumption of their new posts in November, the pair began devising an eight-to-ten year plan for a new interconnected DC Universe (DCU) franchise that would succeed and reboot the DCEU following the December 2023 release of Aquaman and the Lost Kingdom. Gunn and Safran later said that certain actors and their respective characters from The Suicide Squad and Peacemaker would appear in the new DCU, and clarified the events of both the film and series would exist as a "rough memory" in the new DCU canon. He later clarified that The Suicide Squad would not be retroactively incorporated into the DCU and that events would only exist in the DCU's continuity if they were explicitly mentioned in DCU media. In October 2026, Gunn hosted a podcast episode titled "The Suicide Squad: Is It Canon?", in which he declared that The Suicide Squad moving forward could be considered the first canon DCU film. During the episode, Gunn explained that minor details and continuity inconsistencies, such as the film's 2021 setting and Robbie's portrayal of Harley Quinn, could be overlooked if necessary to accommodate the franchise's broader narrative.

==== Creature Commandos ====
Gunn had been working on a new series for DC following Peacemaker's success and prior to his promotion. HBO Max had not greenlit the series, which had yet to be written, but prioritized its release based on Gunn's enthusiasm for it. The series was reported to feature A.R.G.U.S. director Amanda Waller in May 2022, but Gunn stated a month later that the series was separate from a potential Amanda Waller project though there would be "some blending" of characters from Peacemaker in the series. Gunn greenlit the series himself following his assumption of duties at DC Studios, which was revealed to be an animated series based on the Creature Commandos team in January 2023. The series was positioned to be the first installment of Gunn and Safran's DCU, acting as an "apertif" prior to the release of the film Superman (2025), which they regarded as the DCU's "true beginning." The series takes place after and acknowledges several events from both The Suicide Squad and the first season of Peacemaker, notably establishing that the aftermath of Leota Adebayo's exposure of Waller's role in creating the Suicide Squad involved her being banned from recruiting other human inmates at Belle Reve for her black ops missions. As such, she circumvented this ban through recruiting a team composed of monsters and other inhuman subjects. The team's leader Rick Flag Sr., is the father of the DCEU's Rick Flag Jr., who was acknowledged as having been killed in action during "Project Starfish", the Corto Maltese-based mission during the events of The Suicide Squad. Numerous cast members from The Suicide Squad and Peacemaker also appear in the series, with Viola Davis and Steve Agee respectively reprising their roles as Waller and A.R.G.U.S. agent John Economos. The Suicide Squad actor Sean Gunn reprises his role as Weasel and voices G.I. Robot, who are both members of the Creature Commandos. The first season of the series had a two-episode premiere on December 5, 2024, and ran for eight episodes, concluding on January 9, 2025. It has been renewed for a second season.

==== Superman ====
Multiple cast members and characters from The Suicide Squad and Peacemaker appear in the DCU film Superman (2025). Tinashe Kajese reprises her role as Flo Crawley, who became the director of the Federal Bureau of Investigation (FBI) after being released from custody following Waller's arrest, and works alongside Rick Flag Sr., who became the new director of A.R.G.U.S. following the events of Creature Commandos. John Cena makes an uncredited cameo appearance as Christopher Smith / Peacemaker on a news interview where he mocks Superman after the complete message from his biological parents Jor-El and Lara Lor-Van is broadcast by Lex Luthor. Sean Gunn, who voices Weasel and G.I. Robot in DCEU and DCU media, appears as Maxwell Lord, the CEO of LordTech and the benefactor of Metropolis' metahuman team the Justice Gang. Nathan Fillion, who previously played Cory Pitzner / T.D.K. (The Detachable Kid) in The Suicide Squad, is cast as Guy Gardner / Green Lantern, a member of the Green Lantern Corps who leads the Justice Gang. Michael Rooker and Jennifer Holland, who respectively portrayed Savant and Emilia Harcourt in DCEU media, voiced Superman Robot #5 and #22.

==== Peacemaker season 2 ====
In February 2022, HBO Max renewed Peacemaker for a second season, with James Gunn returning as writer, showrunner, and director of all episodes. John Cena reprises his DCEU role as Christopher Smith / Peacemaker in season 2, with Freddie Stroma, Danielle Brooks, Jennifer Holland, Steve Agee, Robert Patrick and Nhut Le also returning as their respective characters from the first season. Frank Grillo, Sol Rodríguez, Tim Meadows and David Denman join the ensemble in main and recurring roles throughout the season, with Grillo reprising his role as Rick Flag Sr. from Creature Commandos and Denman portraying Keith Smith / Captain Triumph, an older counterpart of Peacemaker's deceased brother from an alternate universe. Michael Rooker, who portrayed Savant in The Suicide Squad, also recurs in the season as new character Red St. Wild. The season continues storylines from The Suicide Squad, notably charting Flag Sr.'s attempts to surveil and detain Peacemaker as revenge for his son's murder during the events of the film. Joel Kinnaman also makes uncredited guest appearances as Rick Flag Jr., who was revealed as having an affair with Emilia Harcourt (Holland) between the events of the DCEU film Suicide Squad (2016) and The Suicide Squad, and an alternate Flag Jr. from Earth-2, who is in a committed relationship with Harcourt after she had broken up with that world's Peacemaker. The season premiered on August 21, 2025, and ran for eight episodes, concluding on October 9.

==== Waller ====
A spin-off series featuring Amanda Waller was revealed in May 2022, with Christal Henry writing and serving as executive producer alongside Gunn and Safran. Davis was in negotiations to reprise her role and also executive produce the series, which was expected to build off Waller's appearances in Peacemaker which publicly revealed her work with the Suicide Squad. The series was revealed to be titled Waller and in development for the DCU in January 2023.
