= A Working Man =

2025 film by David Ayer

- Theatrical release poster
- Directed by: David Ayer
- Screenplay by: Sylvester Stallone; David Ayer
- Based on: Levon's Trade by Chuck Dixon
- Produced by: Chris Long; Jason Statham; John Friedberg; David Ayer; Sylvester Stallone; Bill Block; Kevin King Templeton
- Starring: Jason Statham; Jason Flemyng; Michael Peña; David Harbour
- Cinematography: Shawn White
- Edited by: Fred Raskin
- Music by: Jared Michael Fry
- Production companies: Black Bear; Cedar Park Entertainment; Punch Palace Productions; Balboa Productions
- Distributed by: Amazon MGM Studios (United States and United Kingdom); Warner Bros. Pictures (United Kingdom)
- Release dates: March 28, 2025 (United States and United Kingdom)
- Running time: 116 minutes
- Countries: United Kingdom; United States
- Language: English
- Budget: $40 million
- Box office: $89 million

A Working Man is a 2025 action thriller film produced and directed by David Ayer, who co-wrote the screenplay with Sylvester Stallone, based on the 2014 novel Levon's Trade by Chuck Dixon. It stars Jason Statham, Michael Peña and David Harbour. In the film, soldier-turned-construction worker Levon Cade hunts down the human traffickers who kidnapped his employer Joe Garcia's daughter Jenny.

A Working Man was released in the United States by Amazon MGM Studios and in the United Kingdom by Warner Bros. Pictures on March 28, 2025. The film received mixed reviews from critics and grossed $89 million worldwide against a $40 million budget.

== Plot ==
Levon Cade, an ex-Royal Marine Commando, works as a construction foreman in Chicago and has a close friendship with the Garcia family – Joe, his wife, Carla and their daughter, Jenny – that runs the company. He suffers from PTSD and struggles to gain custody of his daughter, Merry, after his wife committed suicide. Merry is now living with Levon's wealthy father-in-law, Jordan Roth, with whom Levon has a rocky relationship after the death of his wife, Jordan's daughter.

One night, while Jenny is out with friends, she is kidnapped by Russian traffickers Viper and Artemis. Joe and Carla report their missing daughter to the police, but they are unable to find any leads. Desperate, the parents offer Levon money to find Jenny, knowing his military past, but Levon refuses, wanting to move on from that. Unsure, he consults his old friend, Gunny Lefferty, a blind ex-Marine Raider, who suggests doing what is right, so Levon agrees to bring Jenny home. He tracks Jenny's last location at a bar, follows the bartender, Johnny, and interrogates him before two more thugs arrive. Levon kills them all and learns that all three were working for the Bratva, a Russian mafia crime syndicate with Symon Kharchenko as enforcer.

Symon's captain, Wolo Kolisnyk, discovers the carnage and has a clean-up crew remove the evidence, but Levon follows him to his private estate, where he interrogates him before drowning him in his pool. Symon sends his sons Danya and Vanko to kill Levon.

Using his contacts from the DEA, Levon infiltrates the organization by pretending to be a dealer to get close to Wolo's son Dimi, who runs the trafficking part of the organization with a biker gang and their leader, Dutch. Danya and Vanko capture Levon with the aid of corrupt cops, but he kills them and crashes the van. Symon learns of his sons' deaths and sends his men to set Jordan's home ablaze, but Levon saves him. Levon takes Merry to stay with Gunny and Gunny's wife at their remote cabin for safety while he heads out to fight the mafia.

Levon interrogates Dimi and has him lead them to the compound where Jenny is being kept before he kills Dimi. He gears up and attacks the compound, taking out Dutch and his biker gang. He finds Jenny and kills Viper, while Jenny breaks Artemis' neck. Symon arrives to see Levon and Jenny leaving. He calls for backup; his boss orders him to leave Levon alone to avoid exposing their organization, and tells him the mafia will kill Symon if he goes rogue. Symon cries out in frustration, unable to exact revenge against Levon.

Levon reunites Jenny with her family and returns home to have breakfast with Merry and Gunny.

== Cast ==
- Jason Statham as Levon Cade, a retired Royal Marines Colour Sergeant working as a construction foreman
- Andrej Kaminsky as Symon Kharchenko, head enforcer of the Russian Mafia
- Jason Flemyng as Wolo Kolisnyk, captain of the Russian Mafia
- Merab Ninidze as Yuri, a representative of the Moscow Bratva whom Symon answers to
- Maximilian Osinski as Dimi Kolisnyk, Wolo's son who runs the sex trafficking ring
- Cokey Falkow as Dougie, an ex-spec op working with Dimi
- Michael Peña as Joe Garcia, Jenny's father and Levon's boss
- David Harbour as Gunny Lefferty, a blind former Marine Raider and Levon's friend
- Noemi Gonzalez as Carla Garcia, Jenny's mother
- Arianna Rivas as Jenny Garcia, Joe's daughter
- Emmett J. Scanlan as Viper, a kidnapper for the trafficking ring
- Eve Mauro as Artemis, a kidnapper for the trafficking ring also known to run surveillance
- Chidi Ajufo as Dutch, a former Army paratrooper-turned-biker leader connected to Dimi
- David Witts as Johnny, the bartender and drug dealer working for the abductors
- Richard Heap as Jordan Roth, Levon's overbearing pacifist father-in-law
- Isla Gie as Merry Cade, Levon's daughter
- Ricky Champ as Nestor, one of Symon's hitmen
- Max Croes as Karp, one of Symon's hitmen

== Production ==
Sylvester Stallone originally developed an adaptation of the Chuck Dixon novel Levon's Trade as a television series with Balboa Productions. The project changed into a film that was up for sale at the 2023 American Film Market, where the film was first announced to have David Ayer attached to direct and Jason Statham to star. In January 2024, Amazon MGM Studios acquired U.S. and select international distribution rights to the film from Black Bear International, which sold the film to independent distributors elsewhere. The film was put into development in part due to its potential for subsequent entries given the number of novels written by Dixon in the series.

In April 2024, David Harbour, Michael Peña, Jason Flemyng, Arianna Rivas, Noemi Gonzalez, Emmett J. Scanlan, Eve Mauro, Maximilian Osinski, Kristina Poli, Andrej Kaminsky and Isla Gie joined the cast in undisclosed roles.

Principal photography began in April 2024 in London. Filming also took place at Winnersh Film Studios in Berkshire, where it wrapped on May 31.

== Release ==
In April 2024, the film was set to be released in the United States on January 17, 2025. In December 2024, the title was changed from Levon's Trade to A Working Man, with a new release date of March 28, 2025. The theatrical release also included engagements in 4DX, Dolby Cinema and D-Box.

== Reception ==
=== Box office ===
A Working Man grossed $37 million in the United States and Canada, and $52 million in other territories for a worldwide total of $89 million.

In the United States and Canada, A Working Man was released alongside The Woman in the Yard, The Penguin Lessons and Death of a Unicorn, and was projected to gross $10–12 million from 3,262 theaters in its opening weekend. The film made $6 million on its first day, including an estimated $1.1 million from Thursday night previews. It went on to slightly overperform and debut to $15.5 million, topping the box office. In its second weekend, the film made $7.3 million (a drop of 53%), finishing second behind newcomer A Minecraft Movie.

=== Critical response ===
On the review aggregator website Rotten Tomatoes, 46% of 162 critics' reviews are positive, with an average rating of 4.9/10. The website's consensus reads: "An efficient action flick that delivers on the meat and potatoes of a Jason Statham vehicle while skimping out on the personality, A Working Man clocks in and out without much fuss or flair." Metacritic, which uses a weighted average, assigned the film a score of 52 out of 100, based on 31 critics, indicating "mixed or average" reviews. Audiences polled by CinemaScore gave the film an average grade of "B" on an A+ to F scale.

In a 2 out of 5 star review for The Guardian, Jesse Hassenger wrote: "At its best, a movie like A Working Man functions as an update to the hard-boiled detective story, with a resilient bruiser conducting his own off-books missing-person investigation. [...]. But Stallone and Ayer don't have the patience for too much skullduggery; skullsmashery is more their thing, and as an action movie, A Working Man doesn't reach the giddy highs of Statham's best."

In a review for The Hollywood Reporter, Frank Scheck praised the acting, particularly Harbour's, but stated: "The film feels overlong at nearly two hours, with repetitiveness settling in early. But it does have its enjoyable eccentric touches, several of which smack of Stallone, who often infuses his portrayals with subtle humor."

David Ehrlich from IndieWire called the film underwhelming, although praised its colourful supporting cast, including Kaminsky, Max Croes and Chidi Ajufo, as well as Rivas. He also considered Statham's performance intriguing and against type, stating: "There's a softness to and around Statham's performance that we rarely get to see."
