= Golden Globe (Portugal) for Best Newcomer =

Annual Portuguese acting award

The Golden Globe (Portugal) for Best Newcomer is awarded annually at the Golden Globes (Portugal) to one of the best Portuguese personalities which had their first success the previous year.

== Winners ==
2010	2011	2012	2013	2014	2015	2016	2017	2018	2019
Daniela Ruah	André Villas-Boas	Nélson Oliveira	Victória Guerra	Sara Matos	Tiago Teotónio Pereira	Mariana Pacheco	Beatriz Frazão	Bárbara Bandeira	João Félix
Acting	Football	Football	Acting	Acting	Acting	Acting	Acting	Music	Football
