= Shared universe =

Type of universe in which works written by multiple writers are set

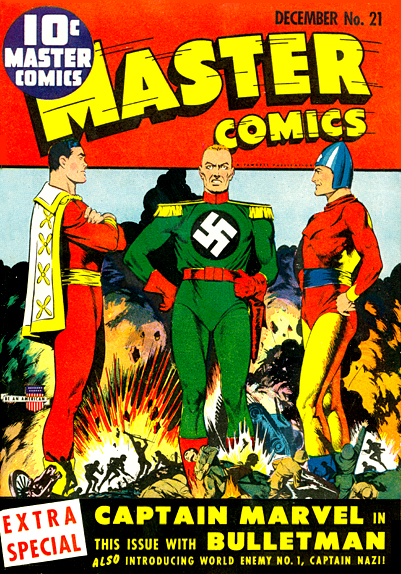
Captain Marvel and Bulletman join forces to battle Captain Nazi, thereby establishing a shared continuity within the Fawcett "universe".

A shared universe or shared world is a fictional universe from a set of creative works where one or more writers (or other artists) independently contribute works that can stand alone but fit into the joint development of the storyline, characters, or world of the overall project. It is common in genres like science fiction. It differs from collaborative writing in which multiple creators are working together on the same work and from crossovers where the works and characters are independent except for a single meeting.

The term shared universe is also used within comics to reflect the overall milieu created by the comic book publisher in which characters, events, and premises from one product line appear in other product lines in a media franchise. A specific kind of shared universe that is published across a variety of media (such as novels and films), each of them contributing to the growth, history, and status of the setting is called an "imaginary entertainment environment".

The term has also been used in a wider, non-literary sense to convey interdisciplinary or social commonality, often in the context of a "shared universe of discourse".

== Definitions ==
Fiction in some media, such as most television programs and many comic book titles, is understood by viewers or readers to require the contribution of multiple authors and does not by itself create a shared universe and is considered a collaborative art form. Incidental appearances, such as that of d'Artagnan in Cyrano de Bergerac, are considered literary cameo appearances. More substantial interaction between characters from different sources is often marketed as a crossover. While crossovers occur in a shared universe, not all crossovers are intended to merge their settings' back-stories and are instead used for marketing, parody, or to explore "what-if" scenarios, often being one-offs.

It can become difficult for writers contributing to a shared universe to maintain consistency and avoid contradicting details in earlier works, especially when a shared universe grows to be very large. The version deemed "official" by the author or company controlling the setting is known as canon. Not all shared universes have a controlling entity capable of or interested in determining canonicity, and not all fans agree with these determinations when they occur. A fanon may instead find some degree of consensus within the setting's fandom.

Some writers, in an effort to ensure that a canon can be established and to keep details of the setting believable, employ tools to correct contradictions and errors that result from multiple contributors working over a long period of time. One such tool is retconning, short for "retroactive continuity", which resolves errors in continuity that came about through previously-written conflicting material.

Readers may also object when a story or series is integrated into a shared universe, feeling it "requir[es] one hero's fans to buy other heroes' titles".

=== Markstein's criteria ===
Comics historian Don Markstein first defined the term in a 1970 article in CAPA-alpha. He laid out the following criteria:

1. If characters A and B have met, then they are in the same universe; if characters B and C have met, then, transitively, A and C are in the same universe.
2. Characters cannot be connected by real people — otherwise, it could be argued that Superman and the Fantastic Four were in the same universe, as Superman met John F. Kennedy, Kennedy met Neil Armstrong, and Armstrong met the Fantastic Four.
3. Characters cannot be connected by characters "that do not originate with the publisher" — otherwise it could be argued that Superman and the Fantastic Four were in the same universe, as both met Hercules.
4. Specific fictionalized versions of real people — for instance, the version of Jerry Lewis from DC Comics' The Adventures of Jerry Lewis, who was distinct from the real Jerry Lewis in that he had a housekeeper with magical powers — can be used as connections; this also applies to specific versions of public-domain fictional characters, such as Marvel Comics' version of Hercules or DC Comics' version of Robin Hood.
5. Characters are only considered to have met each other if they appeared together on-panel in a story.

== Originating in print publications ==
=== Originating in novels ===
The expansion of existing material into a shared universe is not restricted to settings licensed from movies and television. For example, Larry Niven opened his Known Space setting to other writers initially because he considered his lack of military experience prevented him from adequately describing the wars between mankind and the Kzinti. The degree to which he has made the setting available for other writers became a topic of controversy, when Elf Sternberg created an erotic short story set in Known Space following an author's note from Niven indicating that "[i]f you want more Known Space stories, you'll have to write them yourself". Niven has since clarified that his setting is still to be used only "under restricted circumstances and with permission", which Niven granted to the several authors of the Man-Kzin Wars series. By contrast, author Eric Flint edited and published collaborations with fan fiction writers directly, expanding his 1632 series.

A setting may also be expanded in a similar manner after the death of its creator, although this posthumous expansion does not meet some strict definitions of a shared universe. One such example is August Derleth's development of the Cthulhu Mythos from the writings of H. P. Lovecraft, an approach whose result is considered by some to be "completely dissimilar" to Lovecraft's own works. Less controversial posthumous expansions include Ruth Plumly Thompson's and later authors' sequels to L. Frank Baum's Oz stories and the further development of Isaac Asimov's Foundation universe by Greg Bear, Gregory Benford, and David Brin.

Many other published works of this nature take the form of a series of short-story anthologies with occasional standalone novels. Examples include Robert Lynn Asprin's Thieves' World, C. J. Cherryh's Merovingen Nights and Janet Morris' Heroes in Hell.

=== Originating in comics/based upon comics ===
Within comics, the term shared universe has been used to reflect the overall milieu created by the comic book publisher in which characters, events, and premises from one product line appear in other product lines in a media franchise.

By 1961, Marvel Comics writer and editor Stan Lee, working with artists Jack Kirby and Steve Ditko, merged the bulk of the publisher's comics characters into the Marvel Universe. Marvel sets its stories in an increasing number of alternate realities, each with an assigned number in a greater "multiverse". DC Comics and Marvel have also periodically co-published series in which their respective characters meet and interact. These intercompany crossovers have typically been written as self-limiting events that avoid implying that the DC Universe and Marvel Universe co-exist. Exceptions include the twenty-four comics released under the metafictional imprint Amalgam Comics in 1996, depicting a shared universe populated by hybridizations of the two companies' characters. Marvel has since referred to this as part of its setting's greater multiverse by labeling it Earth-692.

Although DC and Marvel's shared universe approaches to comics have set them apart from competitors in the industry, other companies have attempted similar models. Valiant Comics and Crossgen both produced titles primarily set from their inception in a single, publisher-wide shared universe, known respectively as Unity and the Sigilverse.

== Universes in films and television ==
Universes in films (or television) mostly consist of a franchise featuring an umbrella of multiple franchises (film or television) set within the same continuity, each franchise within telling its own stand-alone story focusing on a different character (or group of characters), as well as featuring its own cast, directors, and writers, while also being a part of a coherent, non-contradictory continuity shared with the other works. Fictional universes with major presence in films are referred to as cinematic universes, while fictional universes with major presence in television are referred to as television universes. Universes with major presence in both films and television are also generally called cinematic universes. Some film and television universes are accompanied by video games, and print works such as novels or comics, telling additional canonical stories set within the same continuity.

=== Universes in films ===
Following the films Son of Frankenstein (1939) and Dracula's Daughter (1935), Universal began experimenting with transfictional storytelling with their horror films series throughout the early to mid 1940s. This form was conceptualized by Richard Saint-Gelais who described it as when "two (or more) texts exhibit a transfictional relationship where they share elements, such as characters, imaginary locations, and fictional worlds."

William Proctor in Horror Franchise Cinema (2021) wrote that Universal began transfictional storytelling by applying it to the film series, but these experiments were "not always conducted as carefully or as thoroughly as audiences, especially fans, would expect in contemporary terms". This is seen in Universal's Frankenstein films, the Dracula films which are sequentially fragmented as Son of Dracula (1943) does not reference narratives or characters from either Dracula (1931) or Dracula's Daughter. Following the release of The Wolf Man (1941) and The Ghost of Frankenstein (1942), Universal released Frankenstein Meets the Wolf Man (1942) which operated as a sequel to both films. Proctor suggested that Frankenstein Meets the Wolf Man (1942), the first crossover in film history, and the ensemble films House of Frankenstein (1944) and House of Dracula (1945) established the first "cinematic universe".

Some universes in film have originated as film adaptations of novels, such as the James Bond film series based on the spy novels by Ian Fleming. The films adapt some elements from the novels; however, they are not direct adaptations, nor were they adapted in the same order as the books were released. The first film in the series is Dr. No (1962), followed by 19 sequels until Die Another Day (2002). Due to the 20 films spanning 40 years, James Bond was portrayed by five actors, and other recurring characters have also been portrayed by multiple actors. Die Another Day was succeeded by a rebooted series consisting of five movies from Casino Royale (2006) through No Time to Die (2021), with Daniel Craig as another version of James Bond. After all of Fleming's Bond novels were adapted, (Note: Casino Royale was adapted prior to the 2006 film Casino Royale, but not in the main film series.) the series shifted towards original scripts. Aspects of the fictional universe are retained between films.

The Planet of the Apes film series also originated as a film adaptation of the novel of the same name, taking many creative liberties. The original film titled Planet of the Apes (1968) focused on present-day astronaut George Taylor landing on a mysterious planet ruled by apes, which is revealed to be a future planet Earth at the end of the film. The sequel Beneath focused on Brent, an astronaut sent on a rescue mission to save Taylor. The third film Escape introduced time travel and shifted the focus towards the apes Zira and Cornelius, who appeared as supporting characters in the previous films, as they travel to the past in Taylor's spaceship. The fourth and fifth films, Conquest and Battle, focus on Zira and Cornelius' son Caesar leading the uprising against the humans and to the future depicted in the original film. A television series and an animated series are also considered part of the story. The origin of the Planet of the Apes in the original timeline before the time travel occurred was explained in a prequel-reboot film series with the ape Cesar becoming the main protagonist again, with the story focused on his life from childhood to an old ape, and how the conflict between the apes and the humans started.

The Star Wars film series was created by George Lucas, produced by his self-funded production company Lucasfilm. It originated with the film Star Wars (1977), followed by two sequels The Empire Strikes Back (1980) and Return of the Jedi (1983); together, those three films are known as the original trilogy and focuses on Luke Skywalker, Han Solo and Princess Leia. The prequel trilogy composed of Star Wars: Episode I – The Phantom Menace (1999), Star Wars: Episode II – Attack of the Clones (2002), and Star Wars: Episode III – Revenge of the Sith (2005) expanded the series into a Saga, and focused on Luke Skywalker's father Anakin Skywalker, new cast members portrayed younger versions of characters from the original trilogy, while other actors returned to their original trilogy roles.

On television, the lore was expanded through animation, the animated film titled Star Wars: The Clone Wars (2008) served as the pilot of an animated series of the same name (2008–2014, 2020). Lucas was deeply creatively involved in the previously mentioned works, but he ceased creative involvement with the Star Wars franchise in 2014. Lucasfilm announced that from April 2014, only such previously mentioned works would be considered canonical, along with all of the fictional works released after such date. The animated series Star Wars Rebels (2014–2018), was the first work released after. A sequel trilogy formed by Star Wars: The Force Awakens (2015), Star Wars: The Last Jedi (2017) and Star Wars: The Rise of Skywalker (2019) featured many returning cast members along with newcomers. The films' main saga is conformed of the original, prequel, and sequel trilogies. A concurrent spin-off film series, known as the anthology films, expands the stories of plot points and characters from the main series.

Additionally the Star Wars series expanded into video games, comics, novels, short stories, animated series, and RPG adventures, telling original stories based on the franchise. This classified it as an imaginary entertainment environment, where the films shared the same continuity as all the other media formats — until Disney's 2014 decision to change the canon of the shared universe. Lucasfilm's early teams under Carol Wakarska (later Titleman), Lucy Wilson, Allan Kausch, Sue Rostoni, and later, Leland Chee and Pablo Hidalgo, coordinated a cohesive story-telling and ensured consistency and synergy by avoiding plot holes between all the film and non-film works. The Star Wars Legends brand is now used to brand all the re-prints of these Expanded Universe works (television films, animated series, video-games, comics, and novels) of the franchise which were produced and/or ceased production before April 2014. Lucas praised these expansions of his work in the introduction to the reprinted Splinter of the Mind's Eye, and included a few elements within his works, such as characters and places. Storytellers after Lucas have also incorporated Legends elements in their stories.

There are three cinematic universes based on Marvel Comics characters, all set within a different continuity. The X-Men film series, beginning with X-Men (2000) and concluding with The New Mutants (2020), was the longest-running superhero film franchise to be set within the same continuity. The on-going Marvel Cinematic Universe (MCU), which began with Iron Man (2008), has the most films, as well as television series produced by Marvel Television and produced by Marvel Studios, and a separate run of tie-in comics that share the same multiversal continuity. Following Disney's acquisition of 21st Century Fox, the X-Men film universe was incorporated into the MCU multiverse. Sony's Spider-Man Universe centers on characters related to Spider-Man whose rights are owned by Sony Pictures. It has also crossed over with the MCU, beginning with Venom: Let There Be Carnage (2021) and Spider-Man: No Way Home (2021).

Following the success of the MCU, other studios attempted to replicate its success. The DC Extended Universe (DCEU) is a shared universe that encompasses different film franchises based on DC Comics characters, all of them sharing a continuity. In 2024, it was replaced by the DC Universe (DCU).

In horror, Forbes and The Hollywood Reporter described The Conjuring as the first successful cinematic universe after Marvel's universe, and as of 2022 the second most-successful after it.

Writer/director Kevin Smith created a fictional universe used in several of his films, as well as comics and a television series: the View Askewniverse, which is named for Smith's production company, View Askew Productions. The characters Jay and Silent Bob (played by Smith) appear in almost all the View Askewniverse media, and characters from one story often reappear or are referred to in others. Recurring characters, settings, and motifs of the View Askewniverse first appeared in Smith's debut film, Clerks, in 1994.

A cinematic universe consisting of films whose titles are the names of songs by Simon and Garfunkel was proposed and publicly discussed by movie creators in 2017. Filmmaker Edgar Wright wrote that the Simon and Garfunkel cinematic universe could begin with his movie Baby Driver and Marc Webb's The Only Living Boy in New York, and Wright suggested creation of a film named So Long, Frank Lloyd Wright. Subsequently, other writers, directors, and actors expressed their interest in making films within the universe, such as Rian Johnson: Keep the Customer Satisfied; Lin-Manuel Miranda: Cecilia; Marc Webb and Dwayne Johnson: I Am a Rock.

=== Universes in television ===
This refers to universes that are based on television shows without any films. Television series may lead to a spin-off series set in the same universe, often focusing on a single character from the original. The American sitcom Cheers led to two spin-off series, Frasier and The Tortellis.

An example of shared universes among television shows is the Tommy Westphall Universe Hypothesis, which suggests that hundreds of American television series take place in the same universe. It builds from the assumption that when an actor playing a character from one series guest-stars in a second series, in character, both of those series must take place in the same universe. The theory takes its name from a character in the final episode of St. Elsewhere, where the common interpretation of the events of that finale is that the entire St. Elsewhere universe – including all connected series – exist only within Westphall's imagination.

Following the 2005 revival of Doctor Who, the parent television show developed into a "small television industry" of various interconnected spin-offs, known as the Whoniverse. Two of these spin-offs, Torchwood and The Sarah Jane Adventures, crossed over into the fourth series finale, "The Stolen Earth" and "Journey's End". The main character of Doctor Who, the Doctor, also made appearances in episodes of The Sarah Jane Adventures and Class.

From 2012 to 2023, the television network The CW broadcast the Arrowverse, a shared universe of television shows based on characters from DC Comics. From 2009 to 2022, The CW also housed The Vampire Diaries Universe, a shared universe of various interconnected television series; The Vampire Diaries, The Originals, and Legacies.

Death in Paradise, Beyond Paradise, and Return to Paradise are television series that collectively form a shared narrative continuity often referred to as the "Paraverse". Originating with Death in Paradise, the franchise expanded through Beyond Paradise, which follows former Saint Marie detective Humphrey Goodman after his departure to England, and Return to Paradise, which introduced Australian detective Mackenzie Clarke while featuring Jack Mooney, another former Saint Marie detective, in a key linking role. The three series are connected through recurring characters, shared institutions such as the Metropolitan Police, and direct crossover events, including Goodman's return to Saint Marie in Beyond Paradise. These elements establish a unified fictional universe spanning multiple countries and narrative tones, with each series contributing to an interconnected detective franchise built on character migration, continuity of police hierarchies, and explicit references to events across the shows.

The Marvel Cinematic Universe (MCU) has had expanded into multiple interconnected television universes through shows produced by Marvel Television, such as Marvel's ABC television series, Marvel's Netflix television series, Marvel's young adult television series, and the planned Adventure into Fear franchise. After Marvel Television was folded into Marvel Studios in December 2019, streaming television shows set in the MCU were developed for Disney+, beginning with WandaVision (2021).

The concept of "universes" has also occasionally been discussed in the context of reality television franchises (which, though documenting real-life individuals and situations, typically involve a significant amount of producer guidance). TLC reality series 90 Day Fiancé has had a large number of spinoffs, which have aired both on TLC and on sibling streaming service Discovery+; these have occasionally been referred to, by both parent company Warner Bros. Discovery (WBD) and others, as a "universe". In a 2022 investor presentation, WBD executives referenced the "90 Day Fiancé Universe" as being a core franchise for the company, on par with Game of Thrones and the DC Comics superheroes.

=== Universes in animated movies and series ===
The Mickey Mouse universe dates back to the 1930s when the animated cartoon was expanded into a newspaper strip. Although the characters occasionally portray other roles and with other names, the writers address this discrepancy by thinking of the characters as being "employed" by Disney as actors. Walt Disney, when asked whether or not Mickey Mouse and Minnie Mouse were married, replied that the mice were indeed married in their "private life", but that they sometimes appeared as boyfriend and girlfriend for "screen purposes". The Mickey Mouse universe also includes the Donald Duck universe as a subset.

The Pixar universe is an elaborate fan theory suggesting that all Pixar animated movies take place in the same universe. At the 2015 D23 Expo, during the "Pixar Secrets Revealed" panel, director Mark Andrews rejected the theory, with Inside Out co-director Ronnie del Carmen adding "Do you know what kinds of meetings we'd have to have to make sure all our movies line up?!"

The DC Animated Universe (DCAU) is a television universe that encompasses different animated series based on characters from DC Comics but its associated media includes feature and short films, comic books and video games as well.

=== Universes in video games and the internet ===
Shared timelines originate in video games and the internet. The influence of the Internet on collaborative and interactive fiction has also resulted in a large number of amateur shared universe settings. Amateur authors have created shared universes by contributing to mailing lists, story archives and Usenet. One of the earliest of these settings, SFStory, saw its spin-off setting Superguy cited as illustrative of the potential of the Internet. Another example is the furry-themed Tales from the Blind Pig created at the Transformation Story Archive with some limited publication. Other early examples include the Dargon Project and Devilbunnies.

The computer game series Command and Conquer (since 1995) and Red Alert (since 1996) originally were set in the same universe, connected by character Kane, who had a cameo appearance in Red Alert. Though Command and Conquer does not refer to the alternate timeline of Red Alert, in which Hitler was removed before he came to power, what caused an Allied - Soviet world war instead. Furthermore, if the Allied campaign were to be completed, the Allies would emerge victorious and the timeline would lead into the events of Red Alert 2, though the latter completely ignores anything that could connect it to the Tiberium timeline.

== Other media ==
The 2000 musical Seussical presented several works of Dr. Seuss as taking place in the same fictional world.

Hasbro toy products including G.I. Joe and Transformers are considered by their manufacturer to exist fictionally within the Hasbro Universe. Related shared universes include the Hasbro Comic Book Universe by IDW Publishing and the Energon Universe by Skybound Entertainment.

In the music industry, all kinds of works by American singer-songwriter Taylor Swift, such as her songs, albums, music videos, films, tours, promotional activities, as well as the narratives surrounding her, have been collectively referred to as a musical or cinematic universe by several journalists and media outlets.

== See also ==
- Expanded universe
- Fictional crossover
  - Intercompany crossover
- Fictional universe
  - List of science fiction universes
- Literary cycle
- Media franchise
- Series fiction
- Setting (narrative)
- Spin-off and sister show

== Literature ==
- James Lowder. "Shared Worlds". The Greenwood Encyclopedia of Science Fiction and Fantasy: Themes, Works, and Wonders. Edited by Gary Westfahl. Advisory Board Richard Bleiler, John Clute, Fiona Kelleghan, David Langford, Andy Sawyer, and Darrell Schweitzer. Westport, Connecticut: Greenwood Press, 2005. ISBN 0-313-32950-8/ISBN 978-0-313-32950-0.
