= Blind pig (disambiguation) =

A blind pig is a type of speakeasy.

Blind pig may also refer to:

- Blind Pig (venue), a music venue in Ann Arbor, Michigan, US
- Blind Pig Records, San Francisco, US blues record label
- Blind Pig, whiskey- and rum-flavoured ciders by HP Bulmer
- Blind Pig Brewing Company, a branding of the Russian River Brewing Company
- Blind Pigs, former name of the Brazilian band Porcos Cegos
- Tales from the Blind Pig, a story universe largely hosted on the Transformation Story Archive

== See also ==
- Blind Pig Who Wants to Fly, a 2008 film directed by Edwin
