= DC Universe (franchise) =

Superhero media franchise

- DC Studios logo, used since 2024
- Created by: DC Studios; James Gunn; Peter Safran
- Original work: Creature Commandos (television; 2024–present); Superman (film; 2025)
- Owner: Skydance
- Years: 2024–present
- Based on: Characters from DC Comics

Miscellaneous
- Related media: DC Extended Universe (2013–2023); The Suicide Squad (2021); Peacemaker season 1 (2022); Blue Beetle (2023)

Official website
- Movies at DC.com; TV series at DC.com

The DC Universe (DCU) is an American media franchise and shared universe based on characters from DC Comics publications. It was created by James Gunn and Peter Safran, the first co-chairmen and co-CEOs of DC Studios. The DCU is a soft reboot of a previous franchise, the DC Extended Universe (DCEU), retaining select cast members and narrative elements but disregarding others. In contrast to the previous state of DC Comics adaptations, the DCU features a unified continuity and story across live-action films and television, animation, and video games. Concurrent DC adaptations that do not fit this continuity are labeled "DC Elseworlds". The films and television series of the DCU are divided into "chapters"; the first chapter, named "Gods and Monsters", began with the animated series Creature Commandos and the film Superman (2025).

After Discovery, Inc. and WarnerMedia merged to become Warner Bros. Discovery (WBD), CEO David Zaslav revealed a plan to revitalize the DC brand following the poor reception of several DCEU films. Gunn and Safran were hired to lead the newly formed DC Studios in November 2022 after working on some DCEU projects, including the film The Suicide Squad (2021) and its spin-off series Peacemaker (2022–2025). The pair spent several months with a group of writers developing the overarching story for a new DC continuity that features a mix of popular and obscure DC characters. Some DCEU projects in development were abandoned in favor of new takes, while others—including Peacemaker—continued within the new franchise. Certain DCEU actors reprise their roles in the DCU, with others recast. Gunn and Safran wanted to focus on storytelling needs rather than forcing creators to rush their projects to meet specific release dates. After Skydance inherited the DCU and DC Studios by acquiring WBD in October 2026, former Marvel Studios executive Jeremy Latcham was named as the successor of Gunn and Safran, effective December 1, 2026.

== Background ==
=== DC Extended Universe ===
By late 2012, Warner Bros. Pictures was deemed to be "lagg[ing] behind" rival company Marvel Studios and their shared universe of superheroes, the Marvel Cinematic Universe (MCU). Warner Bros. began planning for Man of Steel (2013), based on the DC Comics character Superman, to start their own shared universe, which became known as the "DC Extended Universe" (DCEU). They announced a full slate of DC films in October 2014. Man of Steel director Zack Snyder was set to return for Batman v Superman: Dawn of Justice (2016) and Justice League (2017), with spin-off films planned for the Justice League members and other DC characters. Snyder was involved in creating the style and projects for the new DC brand, which at that point had films scheduled through 2020.

"The history of DC is pretty messed up. There is the Arrowverse. There is the DCEU which then split and became the Joss Whedon Justice League at one point, became the Snyder-verse at the other point. There was Superman & Lois, there's the Reeves-verse… we came in and did [The Suicide Squad] and that became Peacemaker and all of a sudden Bat-Mite is a real guy… No one was minding the mint, they were just giving away IP like they were party favors to any creators that smiled at them."

— DC Studios co-CEO James Gunn on the state of DC Comics film and television adaptations before the DC Universe

While Batman v Superman grossed $864 million worldwide and was considered profitable for Warner Bros., its box-office performance and divisive reception did not meet the studio's expectations, and many fans and critics scrutinized its dark tone and character choices, blaming Snyder. Warner Bros. executives felt they could no longer give Snyder the "long leash" he had on Man of Steel and Batman v Superman, and reorganized future DC projects under the new DC Films division, though it was not designed to override the studio's "director-driven" mandate. Warner Bros. executive vice president and frequent film producer Jon Berg and comic book writer Geoff Johns were set to run DC Films and wanted to make Justice League more optimistic and hopeful. When the studio was not satisfied with their efforts, Joss Whedon was hired to write reshoots for the film. Snyder left the film after the death of his daughter in March 2017, and Whedon completed the film with significant changes. Justice League was another critical and commercial disappointment for Warner Bros., and the studio was again rethinking its approach to DC in late 2017. Following the film's failure, Warner Bros. met with Marvel Studios president Kevin Feige to discuss whether he would lead DC. Feige apparently entertained the idea, but the talks reportedly "fizzled". Berg and Johns left DC Films, and a planned Batman spin-off film was reworked into director Matt Reeves's The Batman (2022), a film separate from the DCEU.

Warner Bros. intended for future DCEU films to be more standalone than their previous interconnected plan. Walter Hamada was appointed the new president of DC Films in January 2018. That October, James Gunn was hired to write and direct The Suicide Squad (2021), a standalone sequel to the earlier DCEU film Suicide Squad (2016) which retained some cast members but otherwise told its own story. He worked with producer Peter Safran, who also produced the DCEU films Aquaman (2018) and Shazam! (2019). In May 2020, Warner Bros. and Snyder announced that his original vision for Justice League would be released on the streaming service HBO Max as Zack Snyder's Justice League (2021). By the end of 2020, Hamada was planning spin-off DCEU television series for HBO Max, including Gunn's The Suicide Squad spin-off Peacemaker (2022–2025). At that point, there were around 25 other live-action and animated DC-based series in addition to the various film projects. Hamada planned to connect all of these using the multiverse, which was introduced in The Flash (2023).

=== Warner Bros. Discovery ===
In April 2022, Discovery, Inc. and Warner Bros. owner WarnerMedia merged to become Warner Bros. Discovery (WBD), led by president and CEO David Zaslav. The new company was expected to restructure DC Entertainment so the film, television, and video game divisions of the company could be aligned. Even before the merger was complete, Zaslav began meeting with candidates to take over DC—including film executive Emma Watts—with the hope of finding an equivalent to Marvel Studios president Kevin Feige. Despite some recent successes with DC films and series, Zaslav and WBD felt DC lacked a "coherent creative and brand strategy" and were underusing key characters such as Superman. Hamada was still contracted until 2023, and his supporters felt Zaslav was not giving him enough credit for his DC plans and successes. In June, Zaslav announced that DC Films would be separated from Warner Bros. within the WBD structure but would be overseen by Warner Bros. film chairs Michael De Luca and Pamela Abdy until a new DC head was appointed.

At the start of August 2022, WBD decided not to release the DCEU film Batgirl on HBO Max or theatrically, stating that it "simply did not work" and went against Zaslav's mandate to make DC films "big theatrical event films". Soon after, Zaslav said he wanted a new 10-year plan for DC films, and he had enlisted former Walt Disney Studios and Warner Bros. executive Alan F. Horn as a consultant to help find a new leader for DC. Hamada was reportedly upset by the cancellation of Batgirl and tried to leave DC Films, but was convinced by De Luca and Abdy to stay through the release of Black Adam in October 2022. Around that time, Henry Cavill reprised his role as Superman from Man of Steel for a cameo appearance in Black Adam. This was against Hamada's wishes and was approved by De Luca and Abdy when they were approached directly by Black Adam star Dwayne Johnson. Johnson began promoting the idea of a Black Adam vs. Superman film co-starring Cavill in the future, and Warner Bros. began pursuing a sequel to Man of Steel starring Cavill. At the end of August, producer Dan Lin emerged as a potential candidate for taking over DC, but exited talks weeks later, in part due to his concerns with the Batgirl cancellation. Todd Phillips, director of the standalone DC film Joker (2019), was also considered for the role but remained focused on directing the sequel Joker: Folie à Deux (2024).

== Development ==
=== DC Studios and initial developments ===
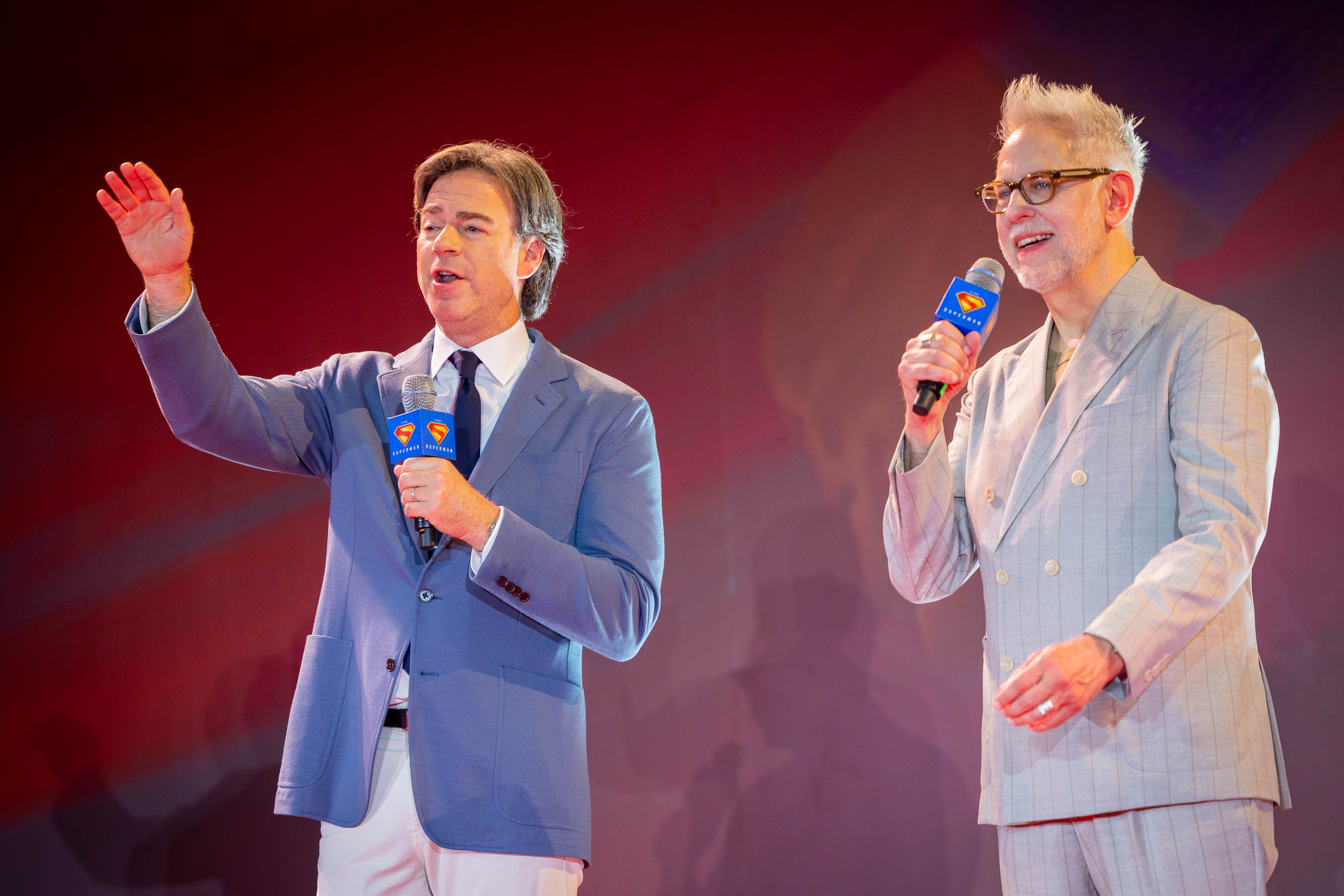
Writer/director James Gunn (right) and producer Peter Safran were appointed as the co-chairmen and co-CEOs of DC Studios in October 2022 and began planning the new DC Universe with a group of writers.

James Gunn and Peter Safran were announced as the co-chairs and co-CEOs of the newly formed DC Studios at the end of October 2022 and were set to take over from Hamada on November 1. The decision to have a high-profile director like Gunn transition to a top executive position at a film studio was considered shocking and unprecedented. Gunn was expected to focus on the creative side of the company while Safran focused on the business and production side, and their deal was reportedly for four years. In addition to their new roles, Gunn and Safran were expected to continue directing and producing projects, respectively, though exclusively for WBD. They would report directly to Zaslav and work closely with De Luca and Abdy. A week after starting their new roles, the pair said they had begun working with a group of writers to develop an eight-to-ten-year plan for the new DC Universe (DCU). Zaslav said they had begun work on a bible for future DC projects that would be finished soon. He also said the new plan would emulate Marvel's model of having a single, unified approach to each character, specifically highlighting new approaches to Batman and Superman. By mid-November, Gunn had already begun writing the script for a new DC film while Safran focused on "fixing" the DCEU film Aquaman and the Lost Kingdom (2023). At the time of Gunn and Safran's hiring, Reeves and Antonio Campos were working on a series centered on Arkham Asylum for the DCU that was originally developed as a spin-off from The Batman, but it was no longer moving forward by July 2024.

In early December, Gunn and Safran were finalizing their plans ahead of a meeting with Zaslav. Patty Jenkins was no longer developing a sequel to her DCEU films Wonder Woman (2017) and Wonder Woman 1984 (2020) after being told by Gunn and Safran that such a film did not fit within their new plans. Various rumors about the plans were circulating, including that the DCU would be a complete reboot of the DCEU that moved away from the actors cast by Snyder, that Matt Reeves's The Batman films would be integrated with the DCU, and that Aquaman actor Jason Momoa would be recast as the character Lobo. These reveals and rumors led to concerns within the industry and among DC fans about the direction Gunn and Safran were taking the franchise, and Gunn put out a statement saying they "were coming into a fractious environment" and there would be an "unavoidable transitional period as we moved into telling a cohesive story across film, TV, animation and gaming". A week later, Gunn announced that they had a slate of projects "ready to go" and would provide more details in 2023. He was writing a new Superman film that would not star Cavill, and Ben Affleck was confirmed not to be reprising his DCEU Batman role moving forward. Gunn and Safran discussed potentially returning for the DCU with Cavill and Affleck to portray a new character and direct a project, respectively; Affleck later said he was not interested in directing a DCU project.

=== Chapter One: Gods and Monsters ===
In January 2023, the DCU was reported to be a "broad but not blanket reset" of the DCEU. On January 31, Gunn and Safran unveiled the first projects from the DCU slate. They revealed the writers who had been working with them on the overall story for the DCU: Drew Goddard, Jeremy Slater, The Flash writer Christina Hodson, Christal Henry, and comic book writer Tom King. The writers took inspiration from the Star Wars franchise, which has "different times, different places, different things", as well as from the series Game of Thrones (2011–2019) and its morally complex characters. The group had planned two "chapters" of story for the eight-to-ten-year plan, with the potential for more chapters after that. The first chapter was titled "Gods and Monsters" and its first five films were Superman: Legacy, The Authority, The Brave and the Bold, Supergirl: Woman of Tomorrow, and Swamp Thing; Legacy and Woman of Tomorrow subsequently had their subtitles dropped. Its first five television series were Creature Commandos, Waller, Lanterns, Paradise Lost, and Booster Gold. Any DC projects that did not fit within the shared universe would be labeled "DC Elseworlds". Gunn said the slate combined DC's "diamond characters", such as Superman, Batman, and Wonder Woman, with lesser-known characters who they hoped would become just as popular. He chose not to retell the origin stories of Superman and Batman because "everyone knows them" already, and pushed back against a suggestion that the DCU was focusing on "niche" characters that only interested comic book fans. He defended the initial slate selection and its different tones and styles by comparing it to the vastly different tones throughout DC Comics publications. Gunn reflected in September 2025 that DC Studios would likely not make films featuring lesser-known characters, such as the Authority, because it was more difficult to attract an audience in theaters for them. DCU television series were initially all intended for HBO Max (briefly renamed to simply "Max"), but in June 2024, WBD shifted many of its planned big-budget Max series to be HBO originals beginning in 2025, including upcoming DCU series such as Lanterns.

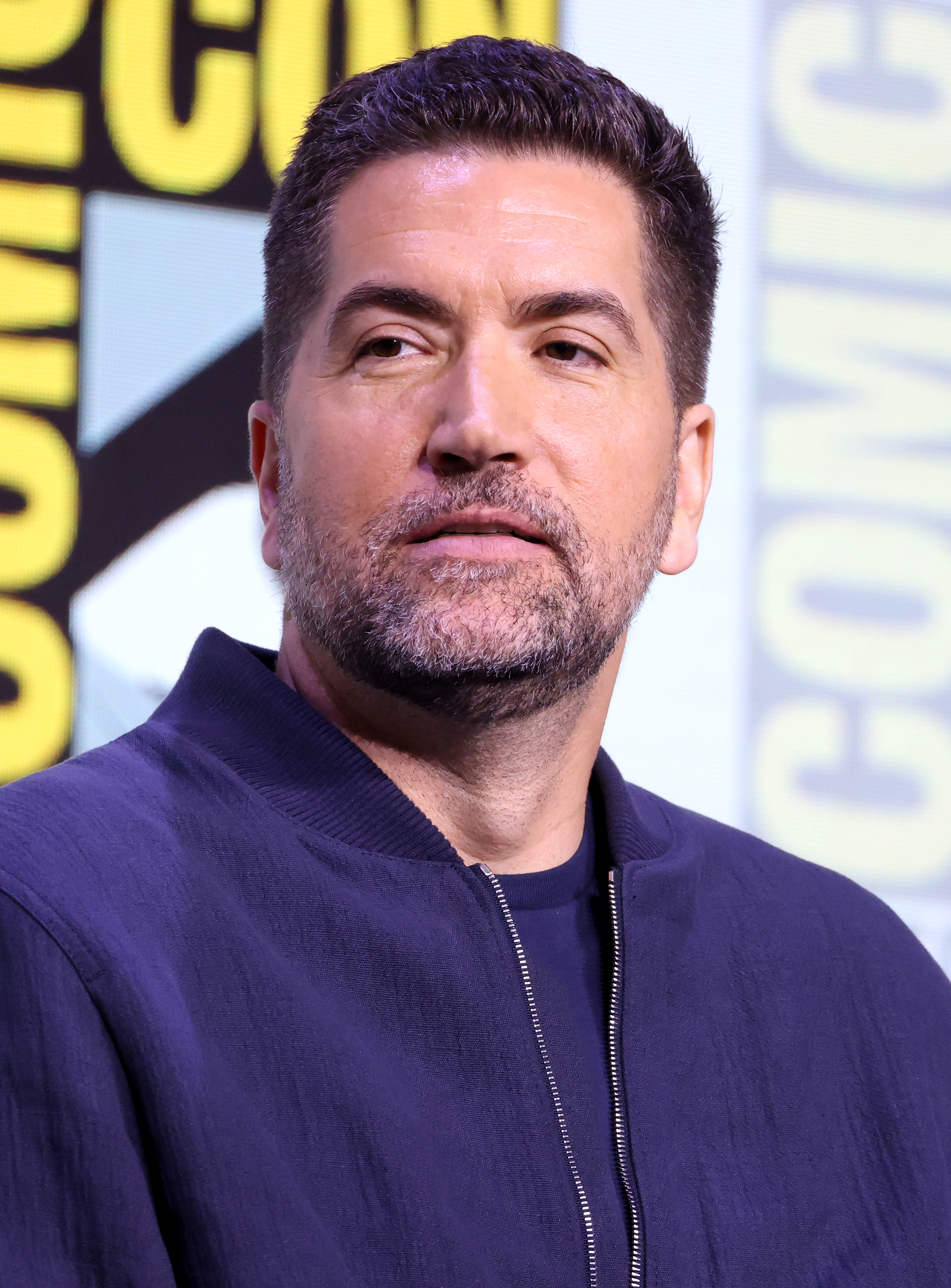
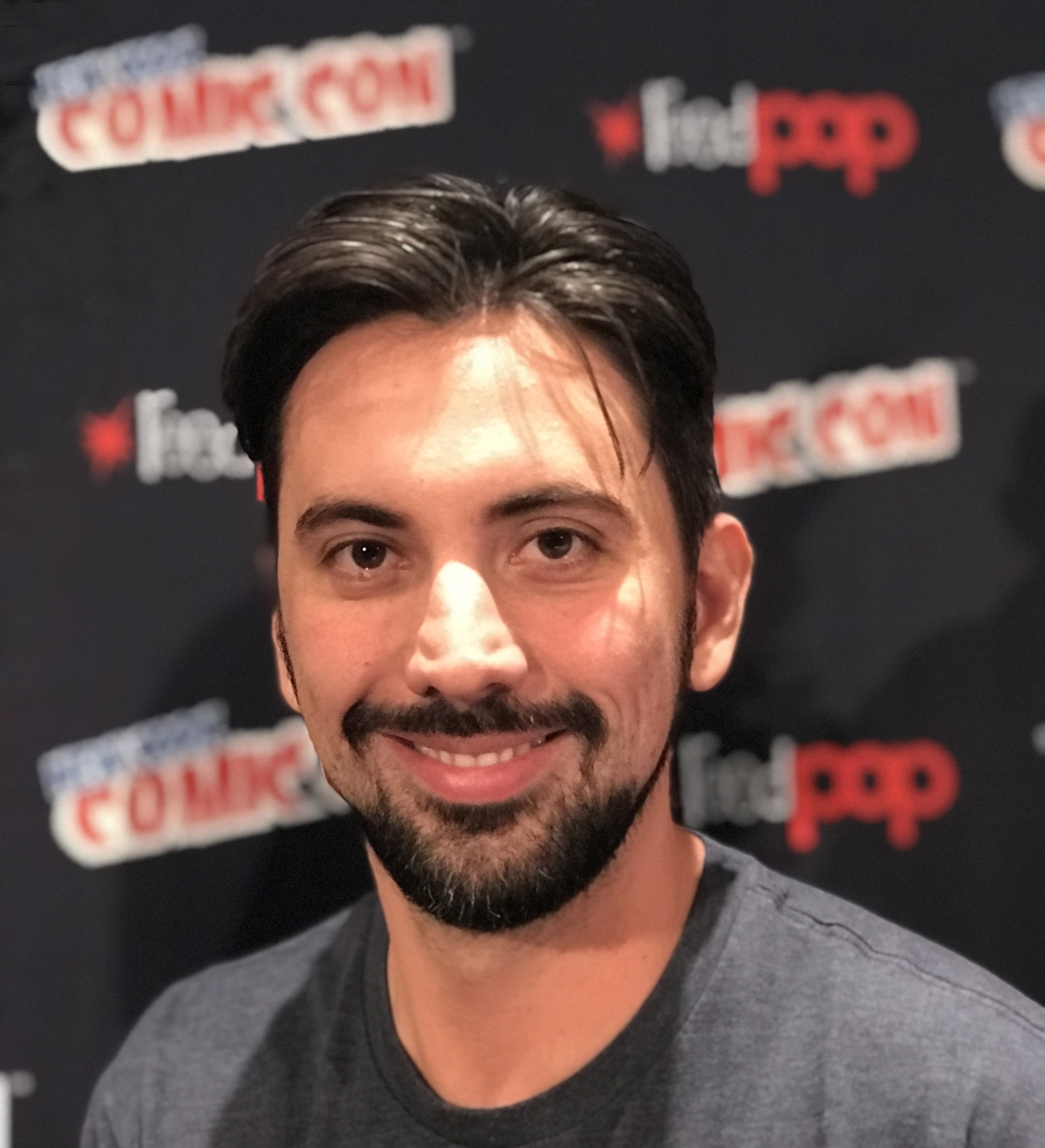
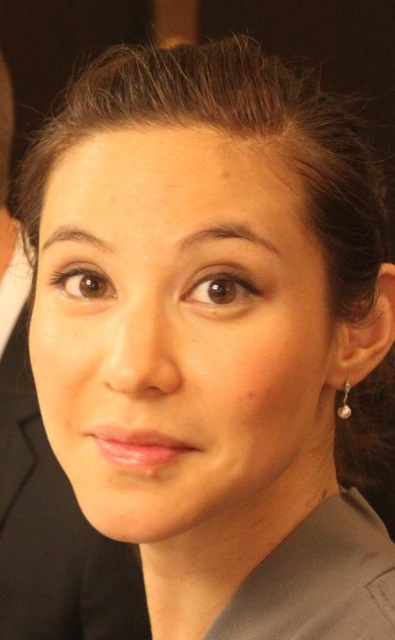
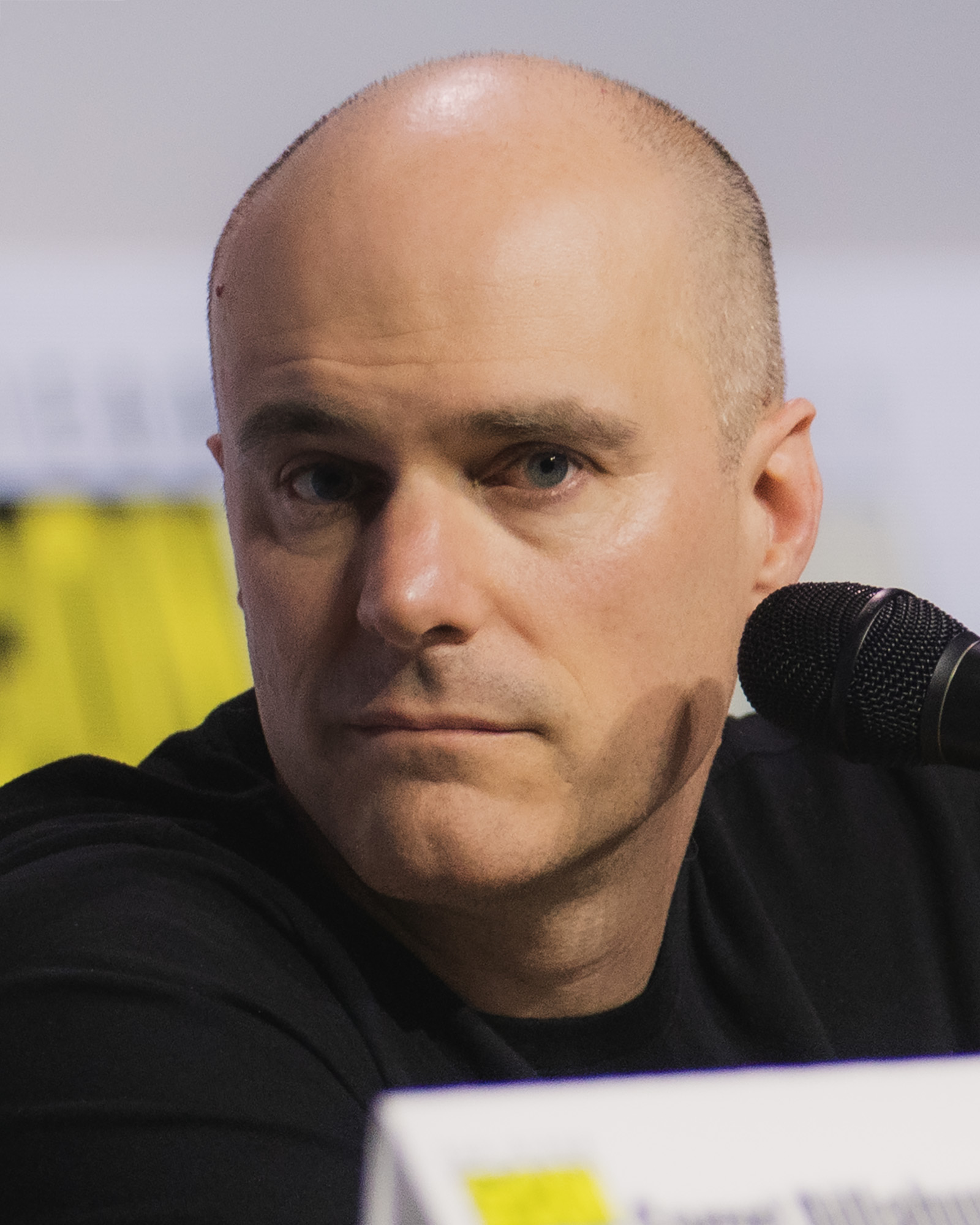
Drew Goddard, Jeremy Slater, Christina Hodson, and Tom King serve as members of the DCU's writers' room, helping plan the franchise's overall story.

Gunn said The Flash would "reset" the DCEU continuity, making the DCU a "soft reboot" that retains certain cast members and elements of the DCEU while replacing others. Gunn and Safran primarily selected the elements that are carried over based on actors. The pair expected characters to be portrayed by the same actors across mediums, including animation. They said Viola Davis (Amanda Waller) and John Cena (Peacemaker) would reprise their The Suicide Squad and Peacemaker roles in the DCU, and a "rough memory" of those projects would remain. Specific moments from the DCEU are deemed to be canon to the DCU if they are directly referenced in a DCU project. In addition to Davis and Cena, there was potential for DCEU actors Jason Momoa, Gal Gadot (Wonder Woman), Ezra Miller (the Flash), and Zachary Levi (Shazam) to also reprise their roles in the DCU, but decisions on those characters had not been made by January 2023. No actor would be playing multiple characters, so if Momoa were cast as Lobo he would not portray Aquaman in the DCU as well; Momoa was later cast as Lobo for the DCU. Gunn added that the then-upcoming DCEU film Blue Beetle (2023) was disconnected from previous DCEU entries and could connect to the DCU, which was reiterated by the film's director Ángel Manuel Soto, who said it was part of future DCU plans. Gunn and Safran soon clarified that Xolo Maridueña's Jaime Reyes / Blue Beetle would continue in the DCU, but the film itself would stand on its own. In July 2023, following the commercial failure of the DCEU film Shazam! Fury of the Gods, Levi cast doubt on his return in the DCU. The next month, Gadot said she would be developing a new Wonder Woman film with Gunn and Safran, but this was soon reported not to be the case. No decision had been made on whether Gadot would be reprising her role in the DCU. Despite this, Gadot later reaffirmed that Gunn and Safran had informed her that they would develop a third film together, and expressed her feeling that DC Studios's transition to the DCU and Jenkins's departure were not "handled elegantly". She confirmed that she would subsequently not return for another Wonder Woman film. Variety reported in October 2023 that no actors from Snyder's DCEU films would reprise their roles in the DCU.

Safran said they were being flexible with the DCU's release order, though some projects key to the overall story would need to be released in a specific order. He added that they aimed to release two films and two series per year. Gunn felt studios being "beholden to dates" was an industry-wide issue and wanted to focus on getting the screenplays right for each project before putting them into production, contrasting Marvel Studios's approach to its productions. He said this happened with The Suicide Squad and that film did not require any reshoots, unlike other DCEU projects. Contrasting the DCU with the MCU, Gunn said the former was set in a "fictional universe" with an alternate history and locations such as Metropolis, Gotham City, Themyscira, and Atlantis, while the MCU is set in a version of the real world, with many of its heroes residing in New York City. Gunn added that he expected the DCU to be more planned out from the beginning than the MCU due to the group of writers working on the DCU's overall story, the DCU focuses on traditional superheroes with secret identities, and some DCU projects were announced to be based on specific comic book runs and story arcs compared to the MCU approach of taking different elements from throughout Marvel Comics history. The day after the slate announcement, several of the comics that Gunn had named as influences on in-development projects appeared on best-selling lists, and some had sold out. Another difference Gunn saw between DC and Marvel was the former having more limited runs with unique tones that were separate from "mainstream comics", such as The Dark Knight Returns (1986), Watchmen (1986–87), and All-Star Superman (2005–2008). He intended to replicate this feeling by having the creators of each DCU project bring their own sense and vision to their projects, adding that the DCU would not have a singular "company style". Supergirl director Craig Gillespie added that Gunn informed him that DC Studios approached each project as if it were an individual graphic novel. Gunn added that most characters' deaths in the DCU would remain permanent, unlike several comic book deaths that saw characters resurrected, unless there was a narrative device that benefited the story and character, such as the Lazarus pits.

When Gunn and Safran unveiled the first projects from their DCU slate, they said a second season of Peacemaker was delayed while Gunn was busy writing Superman. In February 2023, Gunn confirmed that Peacemaker was not canceled, clarifying in October that the second season would be set in the DCU continuity, and said in December that the season would be part of the Chapter One slate. In December 2024, Gunn explained that despite revealing some titles as part of Chapter One, namely the film The Brave and the Bold and the series Waller and Booster Gold, he would not greenlight a project for production until he was happy with its script and it was "where I want them to be". Shortly after, DC Studios greenlit Mike Flanagan's screenplay for Clayface, giving it a release date of September 11, 2026. Gunn explained that a Clayface project had not been planned, but he had been impressed by Flanagan's take on the character after submitting multiple drafts of the script; he decided to greenlight the project and find a way to incorporate it into the larger DCU plans. The Brave and the Bold director Andy Muschietti said development on that film had been postponed at that time in part because DC Studios wanted to ensure it did not conflict with Reeves's The Batman: Part II (2028). Gunn added in June 2025 that the quality of the Supergirl and Lanterns scripts led to their early greenlights, but said that another greenlit film, Sgt. Rock, had been put on hold by then after they determined that its script was not ready at that point. In February 2025, Gunn and Safran stated that they were flexible with the DCU's content output but aimed to release three films—two live-action and one animated—per year, alongside two live-action and two animated series. They had an approximate six-year plan that included a crossover project similar to the MCU's Avengers films, and eventually planned to make a new Justice League film, but described each character and project as individual "chapters of an overall story". DC Studios was reportedly "fast-tracking" a new Wonder Woman film by July 2025, to be part of the Chapter One slate and written by Ana Nogueira, who was described as one of DC Studios' "go-to hitters" after writing Supergirl and working on a planned Teen Titans film for the DCU that had been de-prioritized at that point.

"We have to treat every project as if we're lucky. We don't have the mandate to have a certain amount of movies and TV shows every year. So we're going to put out everything that we think is of the highest quality. We're obviously going to do some good things and some not-so-good things, but hopefully on average everything will be as high-quality as possible. Nothing goes before there's a screenplay that I personally am happy with."

— DC Studios co-CEO James Gunn on the process for the DC Universe films and TV series requiring completed scripts before entering production, which has resulted in some announced projects being put on hold

The second season of Peacemaker, which debuted in August 2025, retroactively changes the DCEU Justice League's appearance in the first season to feature the Justice Gang members from Superman—Isabela Merced's Kendra Saunders / Hawkgirl, Nathan Fillion's Guy Gardner / Green Lantern, and Edi Gathegi's Michael Holt / Mister Terrific—alongside Superman and Kara Zor-El / Supergirl. After announcing the Superman follow-up film Man of Tomorrow (2027) in September 2025, as part of the Chapter One slate, Gunn said that the film would be directly set up by the events of Peacemaker season 2. That season's finale, released in October 2025, introduces the organization Checkmate and the inter-dimensional prison Salvation, which were two important aspects to Gunn's overarching DCU story that he had planned out before being hired as co-head of DC Studios. Gunn said Lanterns would also touch upon both story points and Salvation was a major aspect of Man of Tomorrow. Later that month, Gunn said that the character Darkseid, a member of the New Gods who seeks the Anti-Life Equation to control the universe, was not planned to serve as the Big Bad of the DCU because the DCEU version of the character served a similar role and due to his similarities with the MCU antagonist Thanos. Darkseid and the New Gods are featured in the DCU animated series Mister Miracle.

=== Leadership change under Skydance ===
By December 2025, Gunn and Safran's contracts were scheduled to last through early to mid-2027. At that point, Safran said they had "only literally started scratching the surface" of their long-term plans for DC, and called Gunn the "architect of this grand vision". On the prospects of Warner Bros. Discovery being sold, industry analyst Rich Greenfield stated, "DC is probably the single greatest opportunity in this transaction. DC has been one of the most undermonitized franchises in all of Hollywood, and while it's certainly showing signs of life, it's still a tiny fraction of where Marvel got to under Disney." By April 2026, The Authority was no longer actively being developed. At the end of June, DC Studios executive Lars P. Winther stated that Paramount Skydance CEO David Ellison was interested in and supportive of the studio's DC plans, adding that Gunn and Safran had discussed their content slate with him in anticipation of the acquisition of Warner Bros. Discovery by Paramount Skydance. This followed concerns about whether Gunn and Safran would remain involved if the transaction were finalized, although Ellison and Paramount Skydance planned to retain Gunn and Safran. Gunn stated that no DC Studios project had been put on hold due to the prospective merger.

Responding to questions about a potential strategic revision at DC Studios following the financial underperformance of Supergirl, Zaslav stated in August that the studio was focused on Man of Tomorrow while touting the then-forthcoming 2026 releases Clayface and Lanterns. He stated that DC Studios had a "robust pipeline" that Gunn and Safran were "hard at work" on. Lesley Goldberg at The Ankler reported that month that Waller and Paradise Lost were no longer moving forward. Both series were subsequently reported to no longer be in active development because other DCU series, such as Lanterns and the Jimmy Olsen–centered Superman spin-off The People v. Gorilla Grodd, had taken priority over them, but Waller remained in development while Paradise Lost still had the potential to eventuate. Goldberg explained that Gunn and Safran preferred to coordinate with HBO chief Casey Bloys before moving forward with any series development for the network, and they mutually did not plan to increase the output of DC series at that time.

After the Warner Bros. Discovery and Paramount Skydance merger was completed in October, Gunn and Safran were reported to be formally set to remain at DC Studios and report directly to Skydance co-CEOs Ellison and Ynon Kreiz. Skydance subsequently listed several DCU films as being in early development: The Brave and the Bold, the Bane and Deathstroke–centered Savage Hunters, Swamp Thing, and the Teen Titans and Wonder Woman films. In November, however, Skydance named former Marvel Studios executive Jeremy Latcham as the successor of Gunn and Safran, effective December 1. At this point, Gunn and Safran had planned several films and television series featuring different DC superheroes into the 2030s. Ben Fritz at The Wall Street Journal reported that parts of this plan included debuting Wonder Woman in Man of Tomorrow, introducing the DCU Batman in 2028 or 2029 with The Brave and the Bold, and further Superman sequels intended to be directed by Gunn that somewhat evolved into planned Justice League films that were intended for release in 2029 and 2031. It remained unclear whether this creative plan would remain intact. The Hollywood Reporter and TheWrap attributed the firings to tensions over power between Ellison's team at Skydance and the Gunn–Safran duo, as well as the conglomerate's dissatisfaction with Superman and Supergirl's box-office performances and Ellison's desire to appeal to a more general audience over the focus on lesser-known characters that Gunn had been prioritizing. Ellison and Kreiz had personally delivered the news to Gunn and Safran, who were described as "blindsided", after more than a month of private deliberations. Matthew Belloni from Puck News reported that many of Gunn and Safran's future plans beyond Man of Tomorrow would be "dismantle[d]", with the franchise going "back into reboot mode".

== Feature films ==
=== Chapter One: Gods and Monsters films ===
Feature films of the DC Universe's Chapter One: Gods and Monsters
Film	U.S. release date	Directed by	Screenplay by	Produced by	Status
Superman	July 11, 2025	James Gunn	James Gunn	Peter Safran and James Gunn	Released
Supergirl	June 26, 2026	Craig Gillespie	Ana Nogueira	Peter Safran and James Gunn	Released
Clayface	October 23, 2026	James Watkins	Mike Flanagan and Hossein Amini	Matt Reeves, Lynn Harris, James Gunn, and Peter Safran	Released
Man of Tomorrow	July 9, 2027	James Gunn	James Gunn	Peter Safran and James Gunn	Post-production
The Brave and the Bold	TBA	Andy Muschietti	Christina Hodson	Peter Safran, James Gunn, and Barbara Muschietti	In development
Swamp Thing	TBA	James Mangold	James Mangold	TBA	In development
Untitled Wonder Woman film	TBA	TBA	Ana Nogueira	TBA	In development

==== Superman (2025) ====
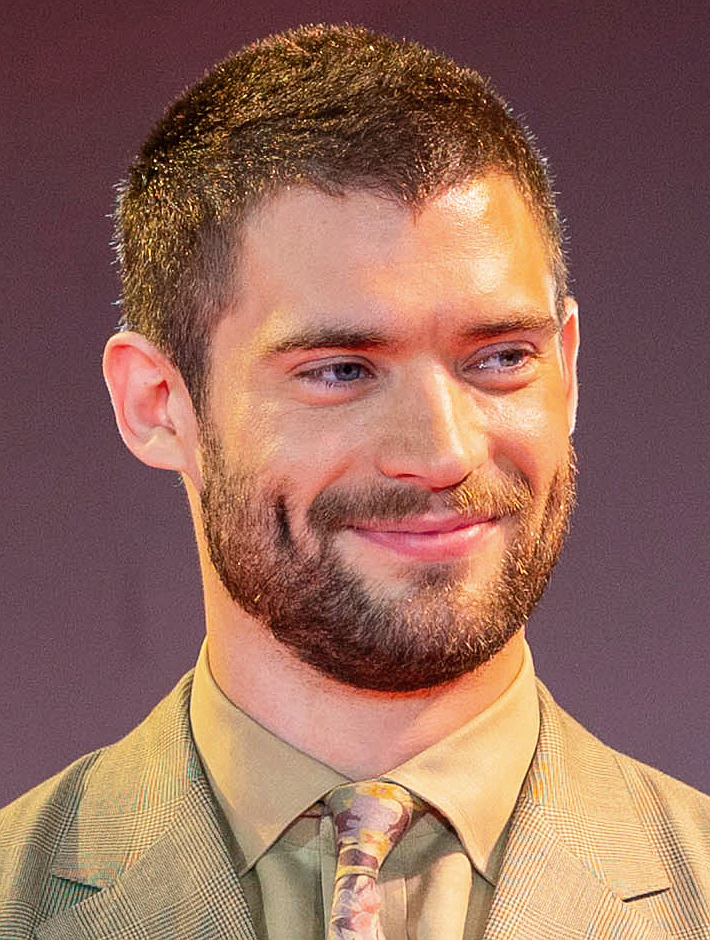
David Corenswet, the star of Superman and co-star of Man of Tomorrow

Although it is not an origin story, the film focuses on a young version of Clark Kent / Superman as a reporter interacting with key characters such as Lois Lane, as he goes on a journey to reconcile his Kryptonian heritage with his human family in Smallville, Kansas. Safran described Superman in the film as "the embodiment of truth, justice and the American way; he's kindness in a world that thinks of kindness as old fashioned".

James Gunn was already writing a new DC film by the middle of November 2022, and revealed it to be a Superman film the next month. He said it would not star the DCEU's Henry Cavill because the script focused on a younger version of Superman. When Gunn and Peter Safran unveiled their initial DCU slate in January 2023, the film was titled Superman: Legacy. Gunn said the film would take specific inspiration from the comic book All-Star Superman (2005–2008) by Grant Morrison and Frank Quitely, along with other comic books. In March, Gunn confirmed he would direct while Safran was producing with him. David Corenswet and Rachel Brosnahan were cast as Superman and Lois Lane in June. The title was shortened to just Superman by the end of February 2024, when filming began in Norway, and primarily occurred at Trilith Studios in Atlanta, Georgia. Filming wrapped on July 30. Gunn and Safran consider the film to be the true beginning of the DCU. Superman premiered on July 7, 2025, and was released on July 11.

Superman is set in mid-2025, after the first season of the animated DCU series Creature Commandos (2024–25), with Frank Grillo reprising his role as Rick Flag Sr. María Gabriela de Faría is introduced in Superman as Angela Spica / The Engineer, a member of the Authority, ahead of a planned film about the team, alongside the introduction of other superheroes, including Nathan Fillion as the Green Lantern Guy Gardner, while Sean Gunn portrays Maxwell Lord; Fillion and Sean Gunn respectively portrayed Cory Pitzner / T.D.K. (The Detachable Kid) and Weasel in The Suicide Squad, with the latter also voicing Weasel in Creature Commandos. John Cena and Tinashe Kajese-Bolden also make uncredited appearances as Chris Smith / Peacemaker and A.R.G.U.S. affiliate Flo Crawley, reprising their roles from The Suicide Squad. The film features the "Quantum Unfolding Chamber" technology from the first season of the television series Peacemaker (2022).

==== Supergirl (2026) ====
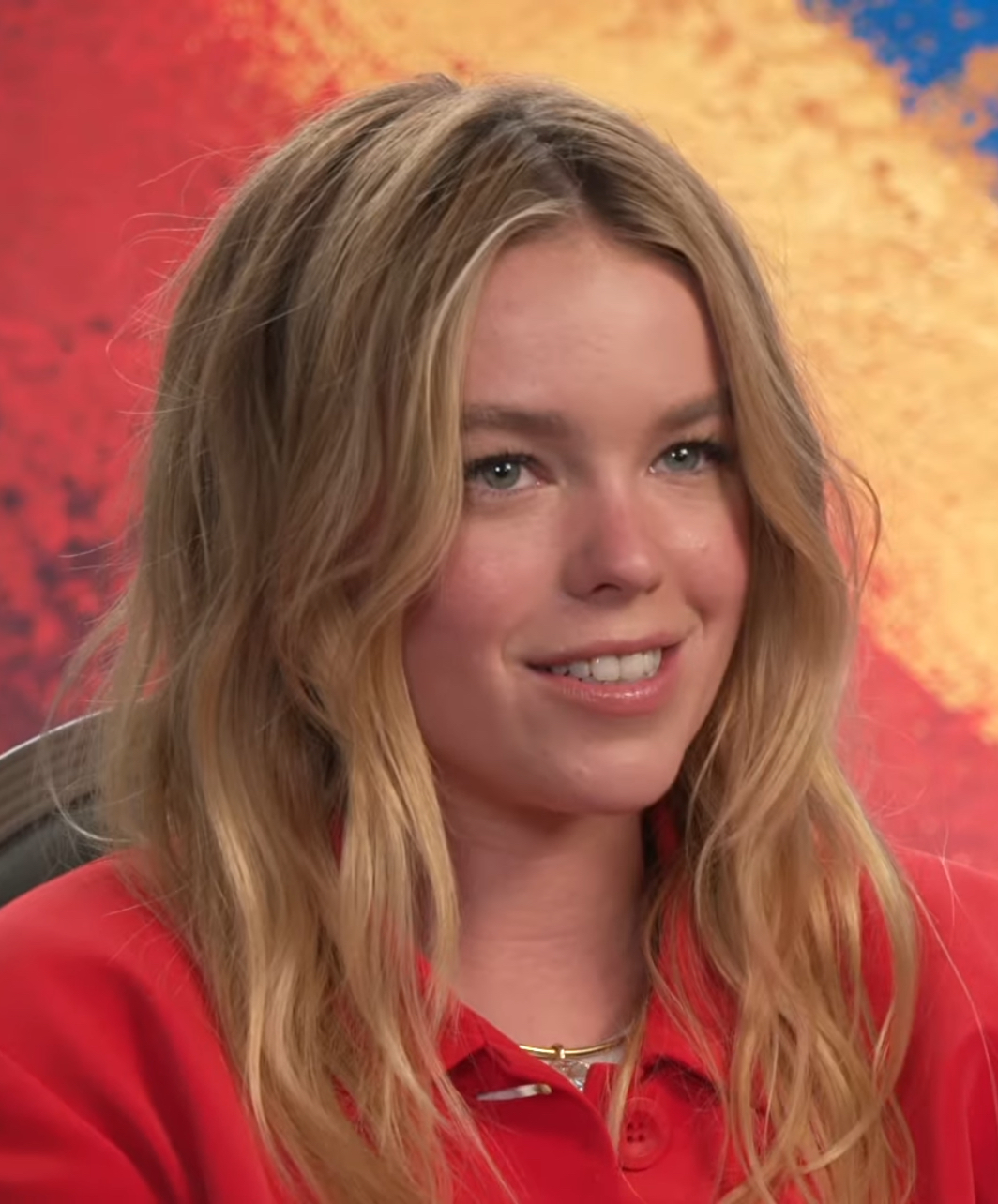
Milly Alcock headlines Supergirl after debuting in Superman.

Described by Gunn as "a big science fiction epic film" and a "beautiful, star-spanning tale", the film contrasts the jaded character Kara Zor-El / Supergirl, who was raised on a chunk of the destroyed planet Krypton and watched everyone around her die, with her cousin Superman, who was raised on Earth by loving parents.

When Gunn and Safran unveiled their initial DCU slate in January 2023 they included a film adaptation of the comic book miniseries Supergirl: Woman of Tomorrow (2021–22) by Tom King and Bilquis Evely. In November 2023, Ana Nogueira was revealed to be writing the screenplay, and Milly Alcock was cast as Supergirl in January 2024, to debut in Superman. Craig Gillespie entered talks to direct the film in April 2024, and was confirmed as director the next month. Filming took place from mid-January to mid-May 2025 at Warner Bros. Studios Leavesden and London in England, and Scotland. The title was shortened by June 2025. Supergirl premiered on June 22, 2026, and was released on June 26.

Supergirl takes place after the events of Superman, with Corenswet reprising his role as Superman. Jason Momoa portrays Lobo in the film, after previously playing Aquaman in the DCEU.

==== Clayface (2026) ====
Clayface is a body horror story about an up-and-coming actor whose face is disfigured by a gangster. As a last resort, he turns to a scientist who transforms his body into clay.

In March 2023, filmmaker Mike Flanagan and his Intrepid Pictures partner Trevor Macy met with Gunn and Safran regarding a film centered on the character Clayface, in which he would not be the villain that he is typically portrayed as in the comics. At the time, it was unclear whether the film would move forward as part of the DCU or as an Elseworlds film; Matt Reeves's The Batman: Part II (2028) was also reportedly expected to feature the character. In December 2024, DC Studios greenlit the film for the DCU with a script written by Flanagan. Safran compared the film's tone to the 1986 film The Fly. Reeves was confirmed to be producing alongside Lynn Harris of his company 6th & Idaho Productions, but Flanagan was unable to direct due to his commitments to the 2027 film The Exorcist: Martyrs and the 2026 miniseries Carrie. In February 2025, Alan Tudyk was confirmed not to be reprising his voice role as Clayface from Creature Commandos and the standalone animated series Harley Quinn (2019–present) because it was not his primary DCU role. At that time, James Watkins was hired to direct the film, Hossein Amini was writing a new draft of the script by May, and Tom Rhys Harries was cast as Clayface in June. Filming lasted from the end of August to the start of November 2025 in Liverpool, England. Clayface premiered on October 13, 2026, and was released on October 23.

Clayface takes place before the events of Creature Commandos and Superman, though Gunn stated that the film's standalone story would also be "very connected" to the overarching DCU narrative.

==== Man of Tomorrow (2027) ====
Man of Tomorrow follows Superman and Lex Luthor "having to work together to a certain degree against a much, much bigger threat" in the superintelligent alien android Brainiac, but Gunn said it would be more complicated than that.

In June 2025, Gunn said he had begun writing a follow-up to Superman that would not be a direct sequel, but would feature Superman in a major role. Corenswet and Brosnahan had options for a potential sequel, but following Superman's release in July, a direct sequel was not expected to be imminently announced. In August, Zaslav confirmed that Gunn was writing and directing the next film in the "Super-Family", which Gunn described as the next story in the "Superman Saga" and said he hoped to begin production soon. In September, Gunn announced that the film was titled Man of Tomorrow and it was given a release date of July 9, 2027, with Corenswet expected to return alongside Nicholas Hoult as Luthor. Gunn said he had finished writing the script at that time. Lars Eidinger was cast as Brainiac in December. Filming took place from April to August 2026, primarily at Trilith Studios in Georgia, as well as in Macon, Georgia, Cincinnati, Ohio, and the United Kingdom.

Man of Tomorrow is set in "real time" after Superman, roughly occurring in mid-2027. The film is also directly set up by the events of Peacemaker season 2 (2025). Aaron Pierre reprises his role of the Green Lantern John Stewart from the DCU series Lanterns (2026), while Xolo Maridueña reprises his role of Jaime Reyes / Blue Beetle from the DCEU film Blue Beetle (2023).

==== The Brave and the Bold ====
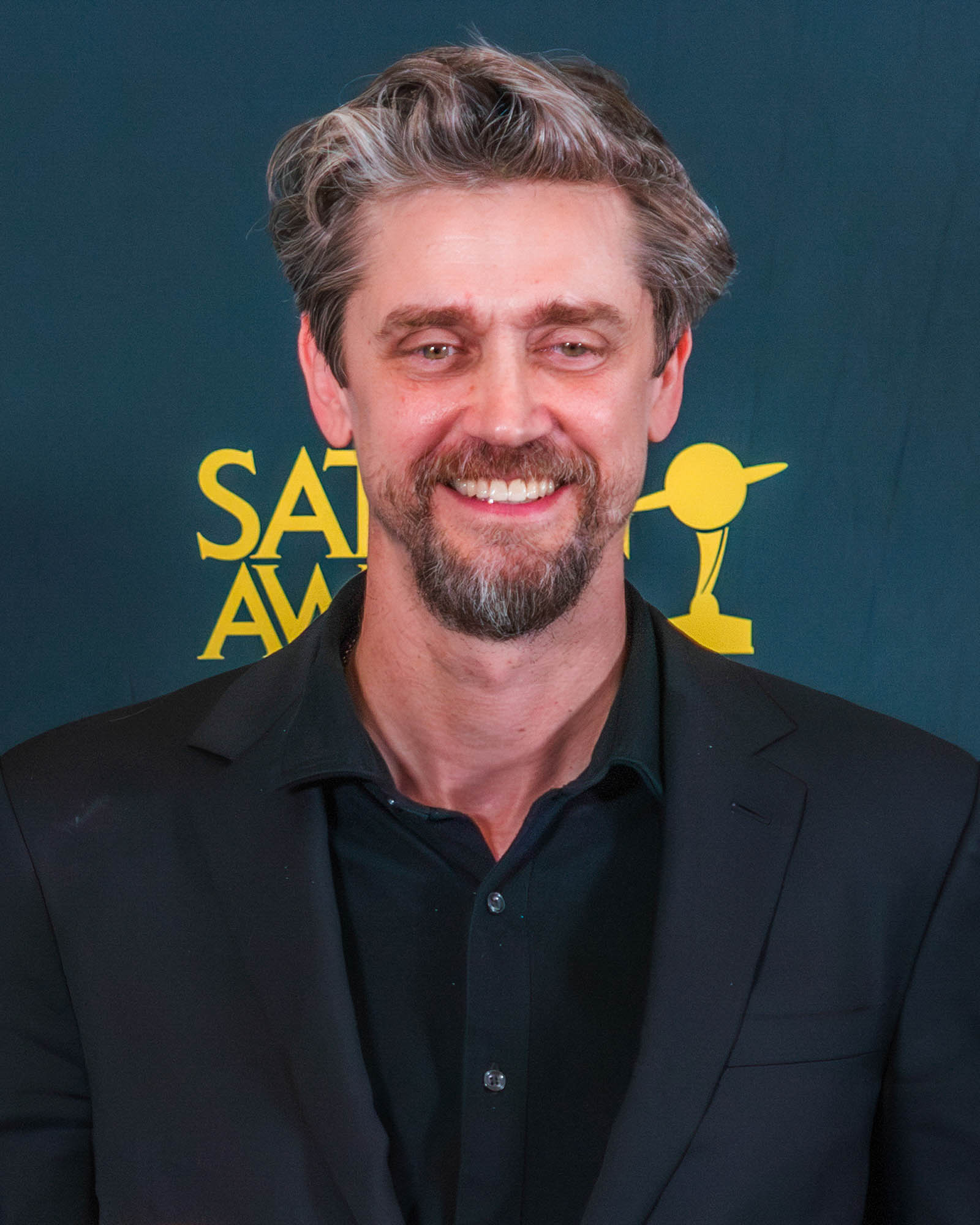
Andy Muschietti, the director of The Brave and the Bold and the DCEU film The Flash

The Brave and the Bold explores members of the "Bat-Family", including introducing Bruce Wayne / Batman's son Damian Wayne as a version of Robin. Gunn said the film would be a "strange father and son story" about Batman and Robin.

After Gunn and Safran were hired, Zaslav said there would not be multiple iterations of Batman with their new plan for the DCU. When Gunn and Safran unveiled their initial DCU slate a month later, they included The Brave and the Bold, which introduces the DCU version of Batman. Gunn said the film was based on Grant Morrison's 2006 to 2013 run on the comics. Ben Affleck was confirmed not to be reprising his DCEU role of Batman, while Matt Reeves's version of Batman was confirmed to continue separately from the DCU's version under the DC Elseworlds label. The Flash director Andy Muschietti was hired to direct the film in June 2023, with his sister Barbara co-producing alongside Gunn and Safran. Muschietti said that development on the film had been postponed by December 2024 because of his other commitments and to ensure it did not conflict with Reeves's The Batman: Part II. A writer had been hired for the film by February 2025 and was closely working on the script with Gunn. Muschietti was not actively involved in the project by then, but Safran said he would be shown a script once it was ready. Christina Hodson was working on the film by late 2025, and she was revealed to be attached to write the script in January 2026.

==== Swamp Thing ====
This Gothic horror film explores the "dark origins" of Swamp Thing.

In December 2022, James Mangold was reported to be interested in working with Gunn and Safran on a DCU project. When the pair unveiled the first projects from their DCU slate in January 2023, they included a new Swamp Thing film. Gunn said it would take specific inspiration from Alan Moore's 1984–85 The Saga of the Swamp Thing comic book run. After the announcement, Mangold posted a picture of Swamp Thing on social media. He was confirmed to be in negotiations to write and direct the film the next day, but was not expected to start work on it until he had completed the films Indiana Jones and the Dial of Destiny (2023) and A Complete Unknown (2024). Mangold's involvement was confirmed in April when he had begun writing. He was simultaneously working on a planned Star Wars film and was unsure which project would move forward first. Gunn described Swamp Thing as a passion project for Mangold. Mangold was actively writing the script by October 2026.

Despite being tonally darker than other DCU projects, Gunn and Safran intend for Swamp Thing to be interconnected with the rest of the DCU.

==== Untitled Wonder Woman film ====
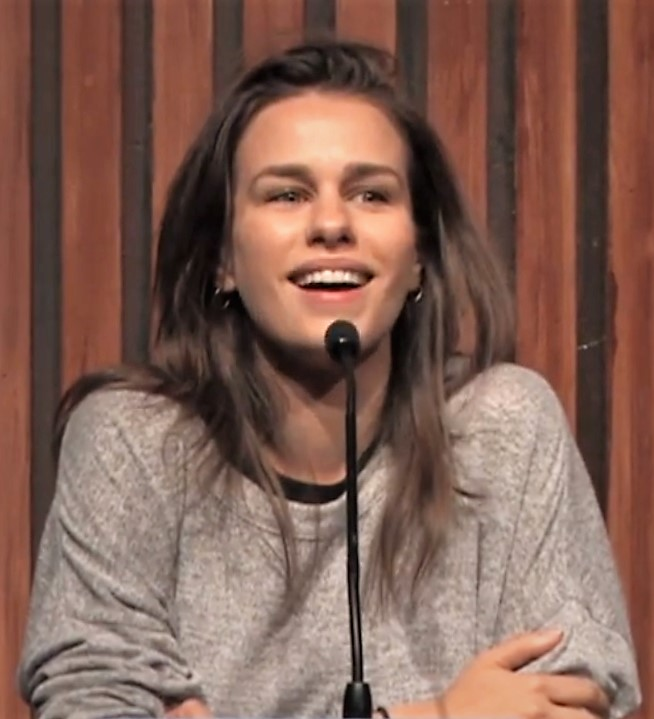
Ana Nogueira, the writer of Supergirl and the Wonder Woman and Teen Titans films

In December 2022, Patty Jenkins was revealed to no longer be developing a sequel to Wonder Woman and Wonder Woman 1984 after Gunn and Safran informed her that such a film did not align with their new plans. In June 2025, Gunn revealed that a new film featuring Wonder Woman, separate from the prequel television series Paradise Lost, was being written and slowly progressing. Ana Nogueira was revealed to be writing the script the following month, when DC Studios was reported to be "fast-tracking" the film.

=== Future films ===
Future films of the DC Universe
Film	U.S. release date	Directed by	Screenplay by	Produced by	Status
Untitled Teen Titans film	TBA	TBA	Ana Nogueira	TBA	In development
Savage Hunters	TBA	TBA	Matthew Orton	TBA	In development

==== Untitled Teen Titans film ====
In March 2024, a film centered on the Teen Titans team was revealed to be in development, with Ana Nogueira writing the screenplay. Gunn and Safran confirmed that Nogueira had been working on the script by February 2025 and that it was in the "very early stages", but the film was de-prioritized when Nogueira began working on the Wonder Woman film instead.

==== Savage Hunters ====
In September 2024, a team-up film featuring the villains Bane and Deathstroke was revealed to be in development, with Matthew Orton writing the screenplay. Orton was confirmed to be writing a script for a DC Studios film in February 2025, though Gunn said its story was not specifically focused on those characters but was similar to that. By May 2026, DC Studios was meeting with several potential directors, including Greg Mottola, who was a frontrunner. Orton was expected to rewrite the script for Mottola if he were hired, but had not yet submitted a completed screenplay while the film remained in early development. DC Studios was reportedly prioritizing the film by the end of June. The title was revealed as Savage Hunters in October 2026.

== Television series ==
=== Chapter One: Gods and Monsters series ===
Chapter One: Gods and Monsters includes several seasons of DCU television series.

Television series of the DC Universe's Chapter One: Gods and Monsters
Series	Season	Episodes	Originally released			Showrunner(s)	Status
Series	Season	Episodes	First released	Last released	Network	Showrunner(s)	Status
Creature Commandos	1	7	December 5, 2024	January 9, 2025	Max	Dean Lorey	Released
Peacemaker	2	8	August 21, 2025	October 9, 2025	HBO Max	James Gunn	Released
Lanterns	1	8	August 16, 2026	October 4, 2026	HBO	Chris Mundy	Released
The People v. Gorilla Grodd	1	8	Mid-to-late 2027	TBA	HBO Max	Tony Yacenda and Dan Perrault	Post-production
Mister Miracle	1	8	2028	TBA	TBA	Tom King	In production
Booster Gold	1	TBA	TBA	TBA	HBO Max	TBA	In development

==== Creature Commandos season 1 (2024–25) ====
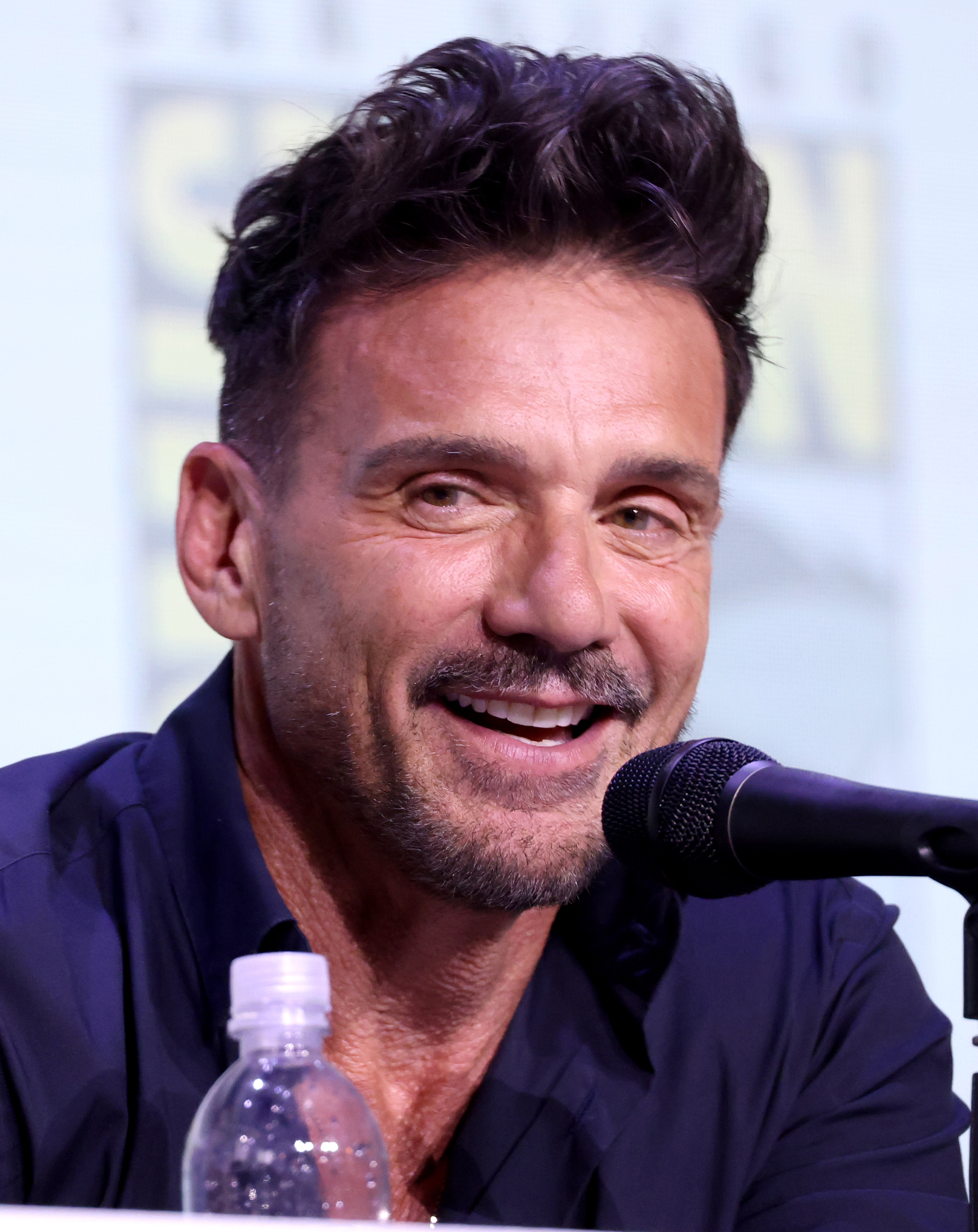
Frank Grillo stars in Creature Commandos and recurs throughout the DCU

Following the events of the first season of Peacemaker, Amanda Waller can no longer put human lives in jeopardy for her clandestine operations as she did with the Suicide Squad and Team Peacemaker. Instead, she assembles a black ops team of monsters consisting of Nina Mazursky, Alex Sartorius / Doctor Phosphorus, the Bride, G.I. Robot, and Weasel, who are led by Rick Flag Sr.

Gunn discussed making an animated series for HBO Max after the success of Peacemaker. He wrote the seven-episode series without a deal, based on the Creature Commandos team of monsters. After he was hired to lead DC Studios, Gunn greenlit the project. When Gunn and Safran unveiled their initial DCU slate in January 2023, the first project was Creature Commandos. Warner Bros. Animation co-produced the series, with Dean Lorey as showrunner and Yves "Balak" Bigerel as supervising director. The main cast was confirmed in April, including Frank Grillo as Rick Flag Sr. and Indira Varma as the Bride, who Gunn said was the main protagonist. Voice recording began by May 2023 and was completed by that August. The first season of Creature Commandos was released from December 5, 2024, to January 9, 2025, as an "aperitif" for the DCU before Superman.

Sean Gunn reprises his role as Weasel from The Suicide Squad, while Viola Davis and Steve Agee reprise their respective roles as Waller and John Economos from both the film and Peacemaker. The series acknowledges the overall events in The Suicide Squad, such as the death of Flag's son Rick Flag Jr. (Joel Kinnaman) at the hands of Peacemaker during "Project Starfish" at Corto Maltese. Members of G.I. Robot's Easy Company are featured, including Maury Sterling as Sgt. Franklin Rock, Robbie Daymond as Little Sure Shot, and Paul Ben-Victor as Bulldozer. Alan Tudyk also voices Matt Hagen / Clayface, after voicing a different version of the character in the standalone Harley Quinn series, debuting ahead of a film for the character.

==== Peacemaker season 2 (2025) ====
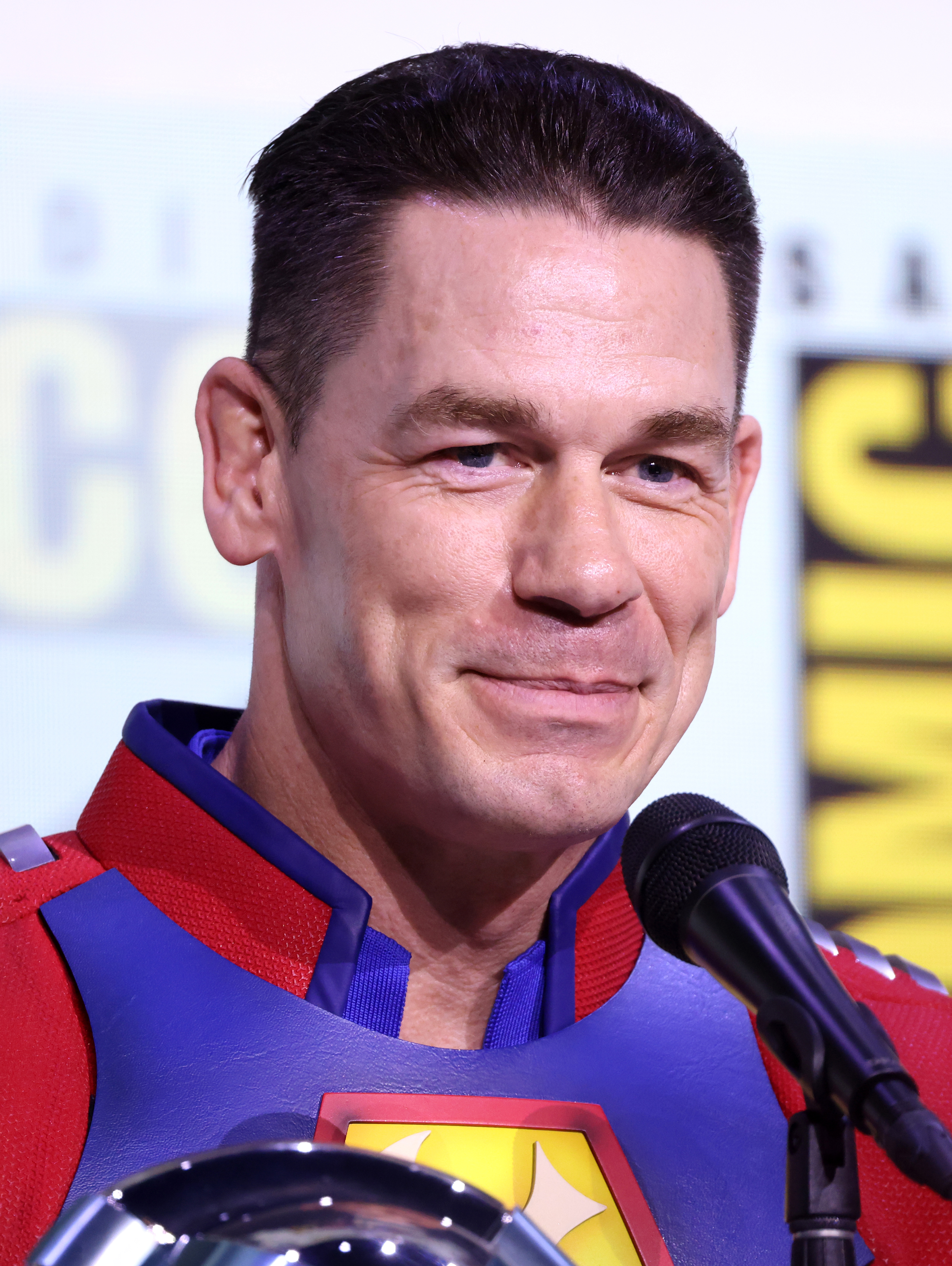
John Cena stars in Peacemaker season 2, reprising his role from the DCEU

Chris Smith / Peacemaker enters an alternate universe where he leads an idyllic life, but discovers he must confront his traumatic past.

HBO Max announced a second season of Peacemaker in February 2022, with Gunn set to write and direct all eight episodes. In February 2023, Gunn said work on the season would continue after Waller had been made, later saying it was his next project after Superman. Gunn was writing the season by that October, when he confirmed that it would take place in the DCU continuity. In March 2024, Gunn revealed that Waller had been delayed and the second season of Peacemaker would instead be produced first. Filming was set to begin later in 2024, simultaneously with Superman. This meant Gunn could no longer direct all of the episodes. Filming began on April 13 with a "pre-shoot", ahead of principal photography, which began in June and concluded in late November 2024. The season was released from August 21 to October 9, 2025.

The season is set one month after the events of Superman, as well as after the first season of Creature Commandos. Reprising their roles from earlier DCU media are Frank Grillo as Rick Flag Sr., Isabela Merced as Kendra Saunders / Hawkgirl, Nathan Fillion as Guy Gardner, Sean Gunn as Maxwell Lord, and Nicholas Hoult as Lex Luthor. Gunn said Luthor's cameo, in which Flag Sr. offers Luthor "an opportunity for redemption", was an important moment for the entire DCU. The DCEU Justice League's appearance in the first season is retroactively changed to feature Hawkgirl, Guy Gardner, and a silhouette of their fellow Justice Gang member Michael Holt / Mister Terrific (Edi Gathegi), alongside Superman and Supergirl. Joel Kinnaman reprises his role as Rick Flag Jr. from the DCEU in a flashback and in an alternate universe. Gunn said the season would be a direct narrative follow-up to the events of Superman containing connections to the larger storyline of the DCU, and described the season as a direct prequel to the Superman follow-up Man of Tomorrow.

==== Lanterns season 1 (2026) ====
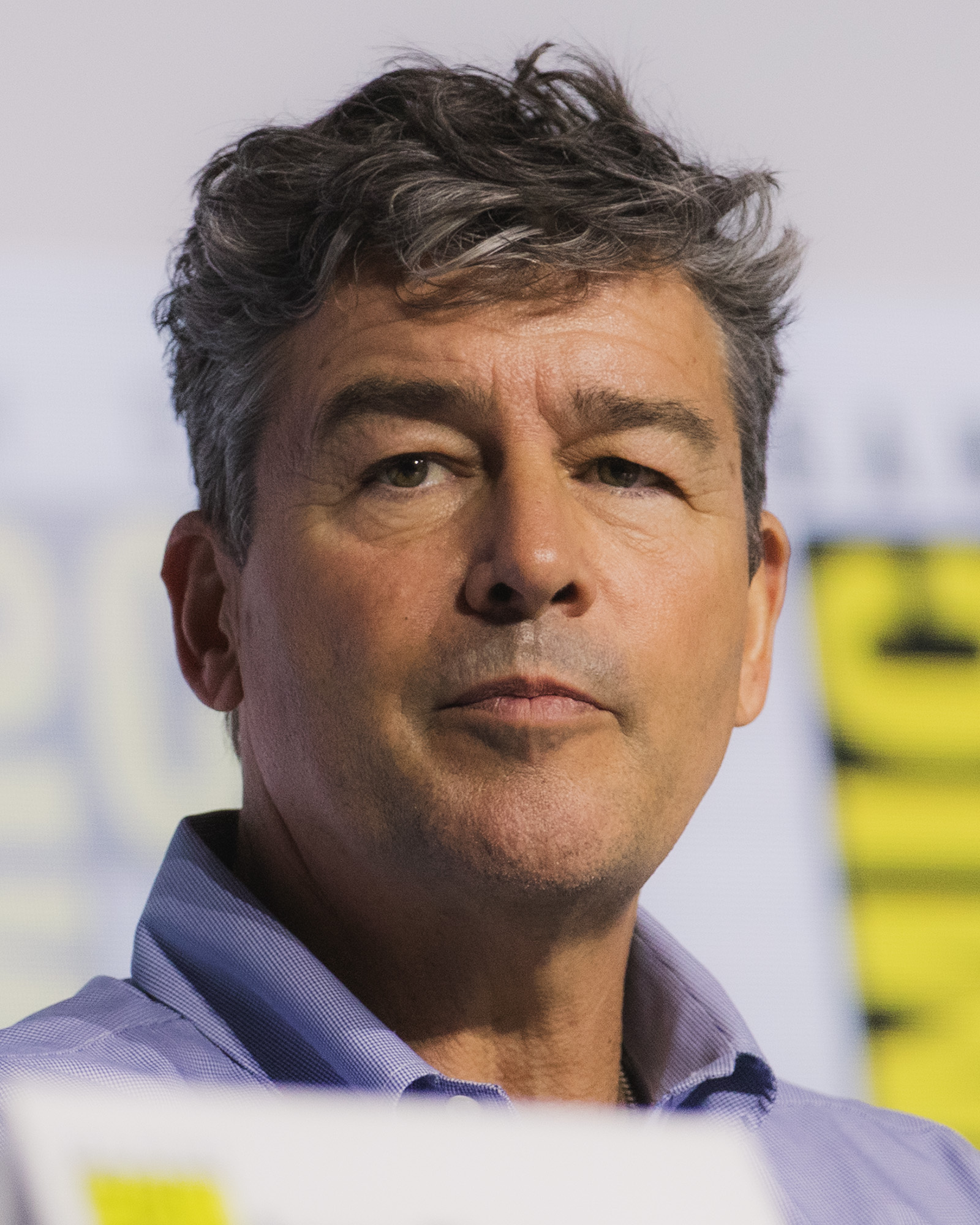
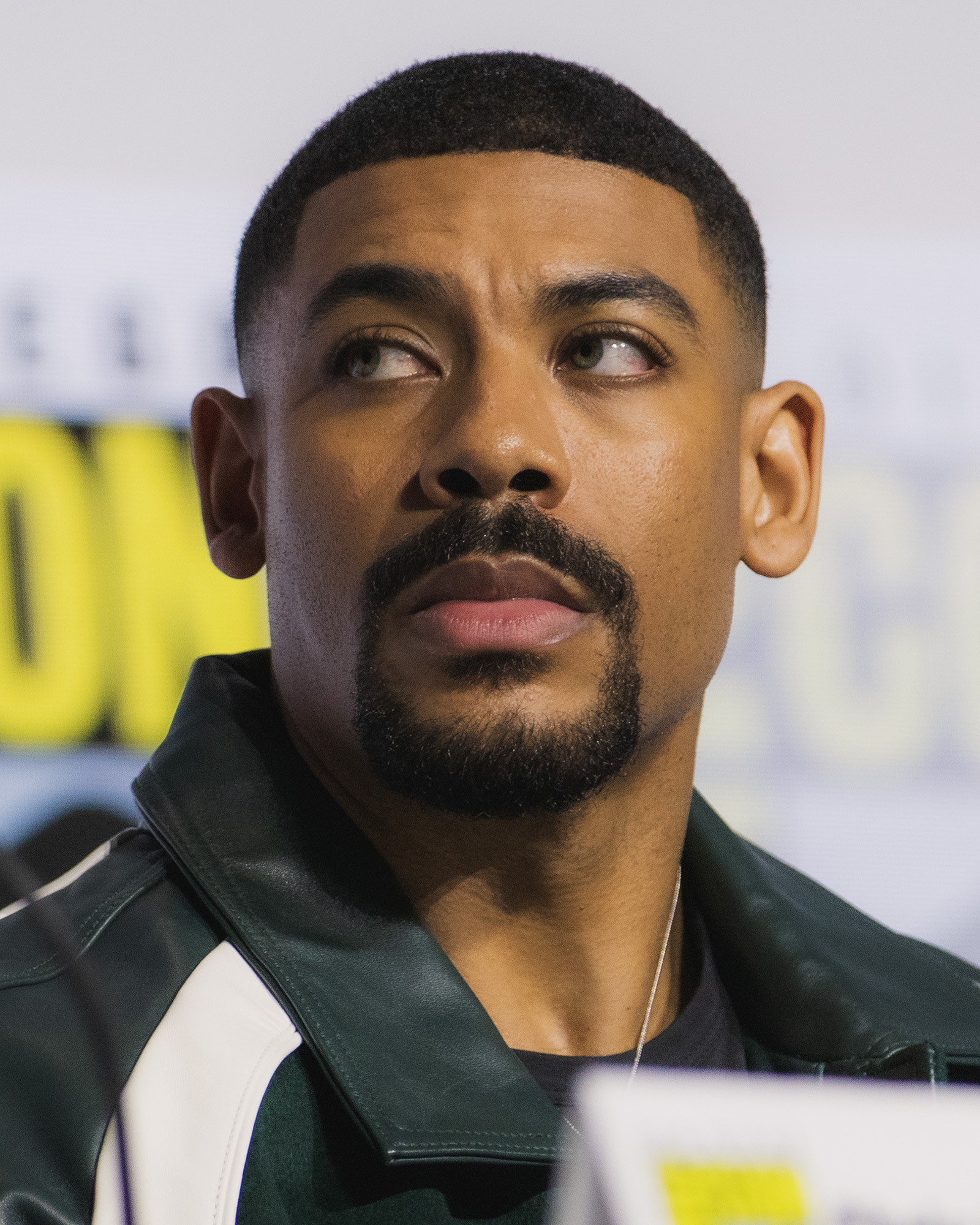
Kyle Chandler (left) and Aaron Pierre (right) headline Lanterns as the Green Lantern members Hal Jordan and John Stewart

Hal Jordan and John Stewart, two Green Lanterns (intergalactic heroes who wear rings that give them extraordinary powers), investigate a mystery on Earth.

Gunn confirmed in December 2022 that the Green Lantern characters would have a significant role in the new DCU. When he and Safran unveiled their initial DCU slate a month later, they included Lanterns, a new iteration of a long-in-development Green Lantern series. Safran said the series would be an Earth-based detective story and "a huge HBO-quality event" in the style of the series True Detective (2014–present). Chris Mundy, Tom King, and Damon Lindelof wrote the pilot script and series bible for Lanterns by the end of May 2024. Mundy serves as showrunner for the eight-episode HBO series. In October 2024, Kyle Chandler and Aaron Pierre were cast to respectively portray Hal Jordan and John Stewart, while James Hawes was hired to direct the first two episodes and executive produce. Filming lasted from mid-February to late July 2025 in Los Angeles. Lanterns aired from August 16 to October 4, 2026. A potential second season was in development by August 2026 and was awaiting a formal greenlight.

The majority of Lanterns is set in 2016 and 2026, with the events of Superman occurring between these two settings. In 2023, Safran said the mystery Jordan and Stewart investigate in the series leads into the main DCU storyline, and Gunn said it would touch upon the story points connecting to Checkmate and Salvation. Nathan Fillion reprises his role as the Green Lantern Guy Gardner from previous DCU media.

==== The People v. Gorilla Grodd ====
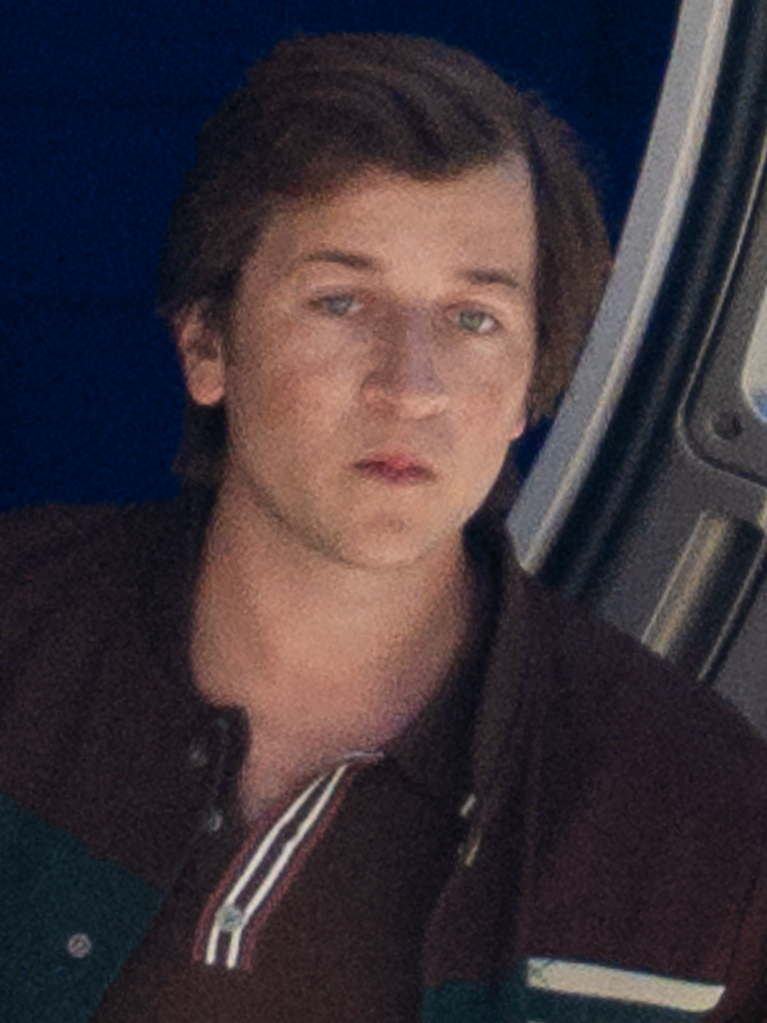
Skyler Gisondo headlines The People v. Gorilla Grodd as Jimmy Olsen

The People v. Gorilla Grodd is presented as a true crime docuseries following host Jimmy Olsen and other Daily Planet reporters investigating whether the superintelligent ape Gorilla Grodd was wrongfully convicted of murdering his father, the king of Gorilla City.

In July 2025, Gunn was reported to be considering spin-off television series focused on supporting characters from Superman, such as Skyler Gisondo's Jimmy Olsen. A mockumentary comedy series featuring Olsen investigating cases involving supervillains, such as Gorilla Grodd, was announced in November, with Dan Perrault and Tony Yacenda attached as the writers, executive producers, and showrunners, along with Gisondo reprising his role. Jimmy Tatro was cast to co-star as Grodd in July 2026, followed by Mary Holland joining early the next month as the series's female lead, Sandra. Later in August, HBO Max ordered The People v. Gorilla Grodd for eight half-hour-long episodes directed by Yacenda. Filming took place from September to October 2026 in Atlanta. The series is set to be released after Man of Tomorrow later in 2027.

The People v. Gorilla Grodd is primarily set after the events of Man of Tomorrow, with various other time periods also depicted. Additional supporting cast members from Superman reprising their roles in the series are Wendell Pierce as the Daily Planet editor-in-chief Perry White, Beck Bennett as Daily Planet reporter Steve Lombard, and Mikaela Hoover as Daily Planet columnist Cat Grant.

==== Mister Miracle ====
This series follows the journey of Scott Free / Mister Miracle, an escape artist and a member of the New Gods, and his warrior wife Big Barda when their home worlds of Apokolips and New Genesis go to war.

In June 2025, DC Studios and Warner Bros. Animation greenlit an adult animated DCU series adaptation of the 2017–18 Mister Miracle comic book miniseries written by Tom King and illustrated by Mitch Gerads. King was attached as showrunner and an executive producer, after previously working on a planned New Gods film for the DCEU that was shelved in 2021, while Gerads was working on the animation. At the time of the series' announcement, the studios had not yet determined a network for its release. King was nearly finished writing all of the episodes by November 2025. In October 2026, Josh Hutcherson and Mackenzie Davis were announced to be starring in the series as Scott Free / Mister Miracle and Big Barda, respectively. Mister Miracle is expected to be released in 2028.

Nathan Fillion reprises his role as the Green Lantern Guy Gardner from previous DCU media.

==== Booster Gold ====
Mike Carter / Booster Gold, a washed-up athlete from the 25th century, travels back in time to the 21st and uses futuristic technology to pose as a superhero.

When Gunn and Safran unveiled their initial DCU slate in January 2023, they included Booster Gold, an "outright comedy" series set in the DCU. A showrunner had expressed interest in taking on the project but had ultimately passed on it by February 2025. The series was reported to be "progressing" at HBO Max in July 2025 with David Jenkins hired to write the pilot and serve as showrunner if the series moved forward; Jenkins took over the series from Danny McBride. Gunn confirmed in April 2026 that the series was still being developed, and Jenkins submitted the pilot script that June. However, Jenkins announced the following month that his pilot was no longer moving forward, with DC Studios looking for a new creative team for the series.

=== Future series ===
Future television series of the DC Universe
Series	Season	Episodes	Originally released			Showrunner(s)	Status
Series	Season	Episodes	First released	Last released	Network	Showrunner(s)	Status
Untitled Blue Beetle series	1	TBA	TBA	TBA	TBA	Miguel Puga	In production
Creature Commandos	2	TBA	TBA	TBA	HBO Max	Dean Lorey	In production
Untitled Mister Terrific series	1	TBA	TBA	TBA	TBA	Allan Heinberg	In development
Lanterns	2	TBA	TBA	TBA	HBO	Chris Mundy and Christopher Cantwell	In development; awaiting potential greenlight

==== Untitled Blue Beetle series ====
In June 2024, an animated series focused on Jaime Reyes / Blue Beetle was revealed to be in development with Warner Bros. Animation for the DCU. It was expected to build off the DCEU film Blue Beetle but tell its own story, and had the potential to lead to that film's star, Xolo Maridueña, starring in a DCU film if successful. Miguel Puga had been working on the series since early 2024 and was expected to serve as showrunner and director. Cristian Martinez was set as writer, with the film's director Ángel Manuel Soto, writer Gareth Dunnet-Alcocer, and producer John Rickard all serving as executive producers. Contracts with the main cast were said to be "in flux" but DC Studios had received positive responses when asking the film's cast about returning to reprise their roles. Maridueña confirmed in July that he would reprise his role as Blue Beetle in the series, and said in February 2025 that the series was intended to debut in 2026. The series was intended to target a young audience, but after HBO Max announced in 2025 that it would de-prioritize children's programming in favor of adult and family programming, it was unclear by July 2026 whether the series would move forward as a result. The following month, Gunn reaffirmed that the series remained in development.

==== Creature Commandos season 2 ====
Creature Commandos was renewed for a second season in December 2024, with Dean Lorey returning as showrunner. Production for the second season had begun by June 2025. Gunn said the following month that the season would be written by a writers' room rather than by himself.

This season takes place after the events of Peacemaker season 2.

==== Untitled Mister Terrific series ====
In July 2025, Gunn was reported to be considering spin-off television series focused on supporting characters from Superman, such as Edi Gathegi's Michael Holt / Mister Terrific. A year later, the Mister Terrific series was revealed to be in active development with Allan Heinberg writing the pilot.

==== Lanterns season 2 ====
Lanterns was expected to be a multi-season series by May 2026, when a potential second season entered development with Christopher Cantwell hired to serve as co-showrunner alongside Mundy. Lindelof and King did not return as writers because of their commitments to the HBO series The Chain and Mister Miracle, respectively, though King remained involved in some capacity. A writers' room had been working on the season for around six weeks by that August, but HBO was waiting to greenlight a second season until after the series premiered later that month to gauge its reception, viewership ratings, and potential demand. Mundy said he, Cantwell, and the writers' room were in the "breaking-story stages" and would discuss it with HBO and DC Studios once they had mapped out a whole season.

==== Other series ====
In September 2025, Gunn said that an undisclosed writer and director were working on a secret DCU television series, and they had discussed visual effects budgets for its superhero costumes.

== Other media ==
=== Related media ===
- The Suicide Squad (2021): This film was written and directed by James Gunn originally for the DCEU. It serves as a standalone sequel to the earlier DCEU film Suicide Squad (2016), but remains largely separate. By October 2026, Gunn considered The Suicide Squad to be mostly canon within the DCU continuity.
- Peacemaker season 1 (2022): The first season of this television series, which is a spin-off from The Suicide Squad, is set in the DCEU, before its events were retroactively changed to fit within the DCU canon in its second season.
- Blue Beetle (2023): This DCEU film remains largely standalone from the rest of that franchise, with its protagonist reintroduced into the DCU in Man of Tomorrow.

=== Krypto Saves the Day! shorts (2025–present) ===
A series of animated short films focused on the character Krypto the Superdog was announced in February 2025. The first season includes four shorts, starting in August 2025 with "School Bus Scuffle!", which debuted on YouTube and as part of Superman's home media releases. It was followed by the remaining shorts: "Halloween Havoc" in October, "Package Pandemonium" in November, and "Coastal Catastrophe" in April 2026, for "Superman Day" and to promote Supergirl. Upon its release, a second season was in production, and it premiered on HBO Max on September 10, 2026. Though the characters' designs are largely inspired by their DCU appearances, the shorts are not canon to the DCU.

=== Comic books ===
In October 2024, Gunn stated that there were no plans to include tie-in comic books as part of the DCU at that time, explaining that any tie-in comics were not canon to the DCU. The following are tie-in comics to DCU media:

- Peacemaker Presents: The Vigilante/Eagly Double Feature! (2025): This comic book was announced at New York Comic Con in October 2024 to promote Peacemaker season 2, with Gunn serving as a story consultant. It features two stories, set between the series's first and second seasons, in which Adrian Chase / Vigilante believes Peacemaker was kidnapped and tries to find him, while Peacemaker himself attempts to go on vacation with Eagly but is hunted down.
- Superman: A Friendship Unleashed (2025): This comic book which was published in May 2025 as part of a cross-promotion by DC Comics and dog biscuit company Milk-Bone for Superman. The comic was also made available at San Diego Comic-Con that July, and remained available for free on DC's website. The comic features Superman and Krypto protecting dogs in a city park while helping evacuate S.T.A.R. Labs in an incident.

=== Video games ===
After announcing the initial DCU projects, Gunn confirmed plans to include new video games in the DCU's shared storyline and said these would tell new stories that could bridge the gap between films and series. They were also being developed so that audiences who do not play video games would not miss any overall story elements. He expected the games to take around four years to make. Warner Bros. Games was developing video games for the DCU by January 2024.

DCU content has been featured in video games such as Minecraft, Fortnite Battle Royale, Mortal Kombat 1 and the mobile version of Injustice 2.

== Timeline and continuity ==
DC Universe timeline
- Titles in parentheses were originally set in the DC Extended Universe, but events from them that are referenced in the DCU are canon.
- Lanterns (2016 setting); (The Suicide Squad); (Peacemaker season 1); Clayface; Creature Commandos season 1; Superman (mid-2025); Peacemaker season 2 (mid-2025); Supergirl; Lanterns (2026 setting); Man of Tomorrow (mid-2027); The People v. Gorilla Grodd

The DCU is the successor to and a soft reboot of the DC Extended Universe (DCEU). The DCEU film The Flash (2023) resets that franchise's continuity, and the DCU largely discards the prior canon while accommodating the inclusion of certain characters from the outgoing franchise. Despite this, James Gunn said in January 2023 that a "rough memory" of events depicted in his DCEU projects, the film The Suicide Squad (2021) and the first season of its spin-off television series Peacemaker (2022), would remain in the DCU, with specific moments from the DCEU deemed to be canon to the DCU if they are directly referenced in a DCU project. The Suicide Squad was not initially retroactively incorporated into the DCU; however, Gunn stated in October 2026 that the majority of The Suicide Squad was canon to the DCU. He acknowledged that while some aspects may not accurately line up within the DCU timeline, he felt it was a more seamless inclusion than Peacemaker season 1. The overall events of The Suicide Squad were acknowledged in the first season of the animated series Creature Commandos (2024–25), the second season of Peacemaker (2025), and the 2026 setting of Lanterns (2026), with the former two set a few years after the film's events. Both Creature Commandos and Peacemaker notably address the death of Rick Flag Sr.'s son Rick Flag Jr. at the hands of Peacemaker during "Project Starfish" at Corto Maltese, while Lanterns references Starro, the basis of Project Starfish. Peacemaker also addresses Flag Jr.'s relationship with Dr. June Moone / Enchantress from the DCEU film Suicide Squad (2016). A vision presented by Circe in Creature Commandos season 1 depicts a potential apocalyptic-future Earth ruled by Gorilla Grodd and Princess Ilana Rostovic.

Clayface (2026) is the first DCU film not to be set in the chronological order of its release, taking place before the events of Creature Commandos and the first DCU film, Superman (2025). That film establishes that Kal-El / Clark Kent emerged as Superman three years before the film's events, which occur in mid-2025, after arriving on Earth from the planet Krypton three decades earlier. Metahumans emerged approximately 300 years before the film's events, with numerous superheroes being active during this period. On retroactively incorporating The Suicide Squad within the DCU canon, Gunn stated that there were some potential complications, such as that film's references to Superman. He clarified that while the film is believed to take place in 2021, it would need to occur around 2023 or 2024, after Superman's emergence, to line up with the timeline established in Superman. (Note: A DCU timeline listing by Total Film places The Suicide Squad approximately 2–3 years before Superman.) Superman takes place after the events of Creature Commandos's first season. Peacemaker season 2 is set a month after Superman, and "an unspecified amount of a couple of years" after its first season. (Note: A DCU timeline listing by Total Film places Peacemaker season 2 six months after the first season.) The majority of Peacemaker's first season is canon to the DCU, except for the cameo appearance of the DCEU Justice League, because that team had yet to be formed in the new continuity. That team is replaced by the Justice Gang members from Superman—Kendra Saunders / Hawkgirl, Guy Gardner / Green Lantern, and Michael Holt / Mister Terrific—alongside Superman and Kara Zor-El / Supergirl, with that scene and the rest of the first season taking place before the events of Superman.

Peacemaker season 2 continues from the events of Superman, and introduces the concept of the multiverse within the DCU through the "Quantum Unfolding Chamber" pocket universe technology that Lex Luthor uses in Superman to access alternate dimensions; at least 100 realities exist within the DCU. Peacemaker season 2 takes place between the main DCU dimension and Earth-X, an alternate reality where the United States is ruled by Nazis and features alternate versions of Peacemaker and other characters. That season also introduces the inter-dimensional prison Salvation, and directly sets up the Superman follow-up film Man of Tomorrow (2027). Supergirl (2026) takes place in between Superman and Man of Tomorrow, with the latter set in "real time" after Superman, roughly occurring in mid-2027. The second season of Creature Commandos will also take place after the events of Peacemaker season 2. Lanterns is primarily set in 2016 as well as 2026, with the events of Superman occurring between those two settings. The People v. Gorilla Grodd is set to take place primarily after the events of Man of Tomorrow, with various other time periods also depicted.

== Recurring cast and characters ==
List indicators

This section includes characters who will appear or have appeared in prominently appeared in two or more DCU projects with significant roles.

- An empty grey cell indicates the character was not in the film or television series, or that the character's official presence has not yet been confirmed.
- ^{C} indicates a cameo role.
- ^{R} indicates a recurring role in the film or television series.
- ^{U} indicates an uncredited appearance.
- ^{V} indicates a voice-only role.

Recurring DCU cast and characters
Character	Films				Television series				
Character	Superman	Supergirl	Clayface	Man of Tomorrow	Creature Commandos season 1	Peacemaker season 2	Lanterns	The People v. Gorilla Grodd	Mister Miracle
Kal-El / Clark Kent Superman	David Corenswet	David Corenswet		David Corenswet		Silhouette^{C}^{U}			
Rick Flag Sr.	Frank Grillo			Frank Grillo	Frank Grillo^{V}	Frank Grillo			
Guy Gardner Green Lantern	Nathan Fillion			Nathan Fillion		Nathan Fillion	Nathan Fillion		Nathan Fillion^{V}
Matt Hagen Clayface			Tom Rhys Harries		Alan Tudyk^{V}				
Michael Holt Mister Terrific	Edi Gathegi			Edi Gathegi		Silhouette^{C}^{U}			
Lois Lane	Rachel Brosnahan			Rachel Brosnahan					
Maxwell Lord	Sean Gunn^{C}					Sean Gunn			
Lex Luthor	Nicholas Hoult			Nicholas Hoult		Nicholas Hoult^{C}			
Jimmy Olsen	Skyler Gisondo			Skyler Gisondo				Skyler Gisondo	
Kendra Saunders Hawkgirl	Isabela Merced			Isabela Merced		Isabela Merced			
Chris Smith Peacemaker	John Cena^{C}^{U}					John Cena			
John Stewart Green Lantern				Aaron Pierre			Aaron Pierre		
Kara Zor-El Supergirl	Milly Alcock^{C}^{U}	Milly Alcock		Milly Alcock		Silhouette^{C}^{U}			

== Reception ==
=== Box-office performance ===
Box-office performance of DC Universe films
Film	U.S. release date	Box office gross			All-time ranking		Budget	Ref.
Film	U.S. release date	U.S. and Canada	Other territories	Worldwide	U.S. and Canada	Worldwide	Budget	Ref.
Superman	July 11, 2025	$354,223,803	$264,500,000	$618,723,803	75	194	$225 million	
Supergirl	June 26, 2026	$72,366,532	$54,000,000	$126,366,532	1,282	1,598	$170–186 million	
Clayface	October 23, 2026	$56,660,568	$52,400,000	$109,060,568	—N/a	—N/a	$30–44 million	
Total		$483,250,903	$370,900,000	$854,150,903	–	–	$425–455 million	

=== Critical and public response ===
Critical and public response to DC Universe films
Film	Critical		Public	
Film	Rotten Tomatoes	Metacritic	CinemaScore	PostTrak
Superman	83% (509 reviews)	68 (58 reviews)	A−	86%
Supergirl	52% (380 reviews)	50 (56 reviews)	B−	—N/a
Clayface	78% (227 reviews)	58 (46 reviews)	A−	90%

Critical response to DC Universe television series
Series	Season	Rotten Tomatoes	Metacritic
Creature Commandos	1	93% (42 reviews)	74 (12 reviews)
Peacemaker	2	94% (149 reviews)	78 (18 reviews)
Lanterns	1	92% (168 reviews)	72 (38 reviews)

== Music ==
=== Soundtracks ===
Soundtracks to DC Universe media
Title	U.S. release date	Composed by	Length	Label
Superman (Original Motion Picture Soundtrack)	July 8, 2025	John Murphy and David Fleming	77:00	WaterTower Music
Supergirl (Original Motion Picture Soundtrack)	June 26, 2026	Claudia Sarne	49:41	WaterTower Music
Clayface (Original Motion Picture Soundtrack)	October 16, 2026	Volker Bertelmann	70:23	WaterTower Music

== Paused projects ==
=== The Authority film ===
Gunn described the Authority as a team that thinks "the world is completely broken. And the only way to fix it is to take things into their own hands, whether that means killing people, destroying heads of state, changing governments, you know, whatever they want to do to make the world better". Safran compared the morally complex team to Jack Nicholson's character Nathan R. Jessep in the film A Few Good Men (1992).

When Gunn and Safran unveiled their initial DCU slate in January 2023, they included a film based on the superhero team the Authority, which was created in 1999 by Warren Ellis and Bryan Hitch for the independent comic book publisher WildStorm. WildStorm was acquired by DC Comics and its characters, including the Authority, were introduced to the DC Comics continuity in 2011. Similarly, Gunn and Safran intended to include WildStorm's characters in their own DC Universe continuity, starting with the Authority. Gunn described the film as a passion project for which he had been working on an outline with the other DC Studios writers, and that the film would have connections to Superman. Gunn was originally set to direct The Authority, but other projects had taken priority over it by February 2025, when Gunn said the film was very big and that the script had struggled coming together. Gunn said in July that the film's unannounced writer had moved on to a different DCU film, and he had met with a television creator about the Authority by that September, but was unsure whether the film would be redeveloped as a television series. The Hollywood Reporter later reported that Jeremy Slater had been the film's writer. In April 2026, describing why the project was no longer in active development, Gunn reiterated the struggles the script went through, noting it did not work "in terms of the larger DCU, both in terms of the story and practical concerns". He hoped to potentially revisit the project in the future, but said it would not be soon and was not in active development. Gunn added that he had no intention of writing or directing The Authority.

=== Sgt. Rock film ===
Safran described the film as a World War II story that explores heroism and conflict. It would follow Sgt. Franklin Rock teaming up with a female French resistance fighter to locate the Spear of Destiny before the Nazis do.

By late November 2024, Justin Kuritzkes had written the script for a film featuring the character Sgt. Rock. Luca Guadagnino and Daniel Craig were in negotiations to direct and star in the title role, respectively, after working together with Kuritzkes on the film Queer (2024). Though there was potential for the project to fall apart if the deals with Guadagnino and Craig did not go through, DC Studios was said to be "bullish" on Kuritzkes's script and it was expected to be Guadagnino's next film ahead of his planned adaptation of the novel American Psycho (1991). Craig had not been attached to the role and passed on it by February 2025, reportedly due to scheduling conflicts and his dissatisfaction with the reception to Queer. Colin Farrell entered negotiations to star in March, but production was halted at the end of April, reportedly due to location shooting issues, but had the potential to be reassessed later that year for filming in mid-2026. Gunn stated in June that the film was put on hold because it "wasn't exactly where I wanted it to be creatively" and he felt it needed to "change a little bit" first. He confirmed that it was still moving forward, and said Guadagnino was no longer involved the following month.

=== Waller series ===
Waller was planned to continue the story of Amanda Waller and Team Peacemaker.

In May 2022, a Peacemaker spin-off series was revealed to be in development featuring Amanda Waller, with Christal Henry writing and serving as executive producer alongside Gunn and Safran. When Gunn and Safran unveiled their initial DCU slate in January 2023, the second project was Waller, which Gunn said would be a continuation of Peacemaker because that series' second season was delayed while Gunn focused on the rest of the DCU slate. Henry was set as co-showrunner of Waller alongside Jeremy Carver, and Viola Davis was confirmed to be reprising her role as Waller from Peacemaker and the DCEU. Additional Peacemaker cast members were expected to reprise their roles in the series, including Steve Agee as John Economos. The series was scheduled to be released in 2024, as an "aperitif" for the DCU before Superman, but production was delayed by the 2023 Hollywood labor disputes and it was set to be released after the second season of Peacemaker. In February 2025, Gunn said the series had subsequently been reconceived to follow that season and had struggled to perfect the script. In August 2026, The Ankler reported that the series was no longer moving forward, but it was subsequently reported to remain in development and was no longer in active development because other DCU series had taken priority over it. Gunn clarified in October that while Waller was no longer actively being developed, it had not received a formal greenlight because it "didn't get to where we wanted it to be", but it remained in development.

=== Paradise Lost series ===
Paradise Lost was planned to be a political drama about the scheming and power struggles on the all-female island of Themyscira before the birth of Wonder Woman.

In December 2022, Patty Jenkins was revealed to no longer be developing a sequel to Wonder Woman and Wonder Woman 1984 after Gunn and Safran informed her that such a film did not align with their new plans. When Gunn and Safran unveiled their initial DCU slate a month later, they included Paradise Lost, which they compared to Game of Thrones. The title is similar to "Paradise Island Lost", a 2001 comic book story arc by Phil Jimenez and George Pérez about a civil war on Themyscira. Gunn said in April 2026 that development was still progressing on the series at that time. Kira Snyder and Janet Lin were revealed to be writing for the series by that June, after their involvement was first reported in 2024. In August 2026, The Ankler reported that the series was no longer moving forward, but it was subsequently reported to still have the potential to eventuate and was no longer in active development because other DCU series had taken priority over it.

== DC Elseworlds ==
When announcing the first projects for the DCU in January 2023, Gunn said any project that did not fit into the DCU's shared universe would be labeled as "DC Elseworlds" moving forward. This is the same as how DC Comics uses the Elseworlds imprint to mark comic books that are separate from its main continuity. Safran said there was a high bar that non-DCU projects would have to meet to be greenlit.

The following projects have been confirmed as part of the "DC Elseworlds" label:

- DC Universe Animated Original Movies (2007–present)
- The animated series Teen Titans Go! (2013–present)
- The animated series Harley Quinn (2019–2025)
- Director Todd Phillips's films Joker (2019) and Joker: Folie à Deux (2024)
- The live-action series Superman & Lois (2021–2024)
- Director Matt Reeves's films The Batman (2022) and The Batman: Part II (2028) starring Robert Pattinson as Batman, as well as the spin-off television series The Penguin (2024), which encompass the Batman Epic Crime Saga; DC Studios briefly considered integrating Pattinson's Batman and Reeves's plans into the DCU before rejecting such a notion.
- The animated film Merry Little Batman (2023) and its spin-off series Bat-Fam (2025–present)
- A planned animated film based on the comic The Jurassic League (2022) written by Brian Lynch and produced by Gunn and Safran
- The animated series Starfire!, My Adventures with Green Lantern, and DC Super Powers
- A planned Black-led Superman film written by Ta-Nehisi Coates and produced by J. J. Abrams set during the civil rights era; While Zaslav initially shelved the project around April 2022, Gunn and Safran reportedly still had the potential to move forward with it, but active development had stalled by early 2023. Gunn said the film was still in development in January 2024.
- A planned sequel to the film Constantine (2005) with director Francis Lawrence and star Keanu Reeves returning. It was one of several DC films listed by Skydance as being in early development by October 2026.

== See also ==
- List of films based on DC Comics publications
- List of television series based on DC Comics publications
