= SFStory =

SFStory was originally a creative fiction writing group on the now-defunct UMNEWS mailing list service. After UMNEWS collapsed, the group was merged in 1991 with the more active Superguy creative fiction writing group and mailing list, with which it shared many active writers.

SFStory is a parody of the science fiction genre, and is one of the first examples of a shared universe on the Internet. The first story was posted on January 19, 1987, by an unknown person, quickly attracting other contributing writers. Some of these writers went on to start Superguy, which soon surpassed SFStory in recognition and volume of output. SFStory has the additional distinction of having been active for over two decades, with new stories posted as recently as 2010. SFStory existed during the birth of the modern Internet culture, and along with Superguy helped illustrate the potential of the medium to mainstream users right when the Internet began to actually see mainstream use. It has survived much longer than similar Internet-based shared universe writing groups, diminishing in activity along with Superguy only when the webcomic trend became widespread.

== Alumni ==
- Eric Burns of Websnark was one of the first and most prolific writers for SFStory, writing regularly from 1987 through 1993, with sporadic entries following.

== See also ==
- Superguy
