= Supergirl (soundtrack) =

2026 soundtrack album by Claudia Sarne

Supergirl (Original Motion Picture Soundtrack)

Soundtrack album by Claudia Sarne
- Released: June 26, 2026
- Recorded: 2026
- Studio: Abbey Road Studios
- Genres: Film score; soundtrack album
- Length: 49:41
- Label: WaterTower
- Producers: Claudia Sarne; Nick Chuba

Claudia Sarne chronology
| Love+War (2025) | Supergirl (Original Motion Picture Soundtrack) (2026) |

Supergirl (Original Motion Picture Soundtrack) is the soundtrack album to the DC Universe (DCU) film of the same name directed by Craig Gillespie and starring Milly Alcock as the eponymous character. The film score is composed by Claudia Sarne.

The soundtrack was released by WaterTower Music on June 26, 2026.

== Production history ==
Ramin Djawadi was revealed to be composing the Supergirl score in December 2025, after scoring several comic book films and Craig Gillespie's 2011 film Fright Night. He was revealed to have been replaced by frequent DCEU film composer Tom Holkenborg in February 2026, before Claudia Sarne took over as composer by the following month.

== Release ==
The soundtrack was released by WaterTower Music on June 26, 2026.

== Reception ==
David Rooney of The Hollywood Reporter gave a mixed review, writing the soundtrack had "the usual random assortment of needle drops".

== Track listing ==
All music is composed by Claudia Sarne.

Track listing
| No. | Title | Length |
|---|---|---|
| 1. | "Supergirl Suite" | 3:05 |
| 2. | "Bar Fight" | 2:50 |
| 3. | "Krypton Destroyed" | 1:53 |
| 4. | "Argo, Pt. 1" | 2:31 |
| 5. | "Argo, Pt. 2" | 2:59 |
| 6. | "Cat and Mouse Hunt" | 3:01 |
| 7. | "Silent Scream" | 1:29 |
| 8. | "Lobo" | 2:56 |
| 9. | "Krem" | 2:27 |
| 10. | "The Battle" | 2:28 |
| 11. | "Flying Through Space" | 2:15 |
| 12. | "Sklarian Raiders" | 3:00 |
| 13. | "Vigilantes (Space Cowgirls)" | 2:30 |
| 14. | "The Cave" | 3:14 |
| 15. | "Supergirl" | 2:58 |
| 16. | "Poisoned" | 2:56 |
| 17. | "Ruthye" | 2:16 |
| 18. | "Clark's Apartment" | 1:38 |
| 19. | "Reunited" | 3:05 |
| Total length: | | 49:41 |

== Additional music ==
Songs featured in the film that are not featured on the soundtrack album include: "This Summer" by Sleigh Bells, "Digital Tattoo" by Werner Neidermeier, "Le Temps de l'amour" by Françoise Hardy, "Catch These Fists" by Wet Leg, "Silver Lining" by Rilo Kiley, "Satin in a Coffin" by Modest Mouse, "Smile" by Wolf Alice, "(I've Got) Trouble in Mind" by The Limiñanas, "What Are We" by Winnie Ama, "The Girl from Ipanema" by Antônio Carlos Jobim, "Cheek to Cheek" by Ella Fitzgerald, "Safeword" by Halsey, "Care" by Hana Vu, "Roforofo Fight" by Fela Kuti, "Don't Speak (I Came to Make a Bang!)" by Eagles of Death Metal, "The Middle" by Kelty Greye and KidMotel, and the "Original Superman Theme" by John Williams. "The Middle", which plays over the film's final major action sequence, was chosen after Gunn personally selected it out of approximately 45 songs that were in contention. The original plan was to have a cover version of "Girls Just Wanna Have Fun" by Cyndi Lauper, also chosen by Gunn, but this was scrapped.

== Charts ==
Chart performance for Supergirl (Original Motion Picture Soundtrack)
| Chart (2026) | Peak position |
|---|---|
| UK Album Downloads (Official Charts) | 92 |
| UK Soundtrack Albums (Official Charts) | 50 |
