= Superman: A Friendship Unleashed =

2025 tie-in comic

Publication information
- Format: One-shot
- Genre: Superhero
- Publication date: July 2025
- No. of issues: 1
- Main character(s): Superman; Krypto

Creative team
- Written by: Ivan Cohen
- Artist: Travis Mercer
- Letterer: Dave Sharpe
- Colorist: Andrew Dalhouse
- Editor: Michael McCalister

Superman: A Friendship Unleashed is a 2025 comic and tie-in for the film Superman. The comic was written by Ivan Cohen with art by Travis Mercer and a cover by Mercer and Andrew Dalhouse. The comic was created in partnership with one of the film's sponsors, Milk-Bone, and features Krypto in a story ahead of his appearance in the film.

== Plot ==
Superman and Krypto play with meteors in space, then return to Metropolis to play fetch. They are interrupted by an explosion at S.T.A.R. Labs and notice a fire truck rushing to help that accidentally drives through the park. Krypto helps the panicking dogs return to the dog park while Superman rushes to S.T.A.R. Labs, finding two scientists stuck on the fortieth floor. Superman rescues the scientists, and Krypto rescues one of the scientists' service dog. Superman and Krypto take the scientist and his dog to play in the park.

== Publication history ==
The comic is written by Ivan Cohen, with art by Travis Mercer. The cover was made by Mercer along with Andrew Dalhouse. In the comic, Superman displays various abilities of his, including his x-ray vision, ability to survive a vacuum, flight, superhuman strength, invulnerability, and superhuman breath, for the first time in the rebooted DC Universe (DCU).

The comic was published in May 2025 and sold as part of a bundle with Milk-Bone dog biscuits. It was also put up on DC Universe Unlimited for free, which stayed up even after the deal was taken off Milk-Bone's website. At San Diego Comic-Con that year, DC Comics gave the comic out for free at their booth with a purchase of a box of Milk-Bone biscuits which featured Krypto. That version of the comic had no logos or text on the cover. Another day, DC hosted Guide Dogs of America at their booth.

== Reception ==
David Thompson of The Direct noted significance in Superman using his x-ray vision to locate the scientists, since the previous live-action incarnation, portrayed by Henry Cavill, rarely used the power. Thompson expressed hope that the power would be used in the film, hoping to explore the broader range of Superman's abilities unlike the previous version. He also said that the comic represented the major creative difference between the rebooted Superman and the previous version, recentering Superman's mythos in the reboot as indicated by the comic.

Writing for Nerdist, Tai Gooden praised the artwork on the Milk-Bone box that came with the comic and referred to the comic itself as "fun." In a similarly lighthearted review of all of the Milk-Bone tie-ins with Superman, including a commercial for the dog biscuits, Shame Romanchick wrote for Collider that, "Corenswet's Superman is going to have his hands full with this energetic space pup," praising Krypto's characterization in the comic.
