= Paradise Island Lost =

2001 Wonder Woman comic book story arc

- Cover of Wonder Woman vol. 2, 168 (May 2001), art by Adam Hughes
- Publisher: DC Comics
- Publication date: May – June 2001
- Genre: Superhero; Mythology
- Title(s): Wonder Woman vol. 2, #168–169
- Main character(s): Wonder Woman, Queen Hippolyta, Donna Troy, Artemis

Creative team
- Writer(s): Phil Jimenez, George Pérez
- Penciller: Phil Jimenez
- Inker(s): Phil Jimenez, George Pérez
- Colorist: Pamela Rambo

"Paradise Island Lost" is the name of a two-part story arc written by Phil Jimenez and George Pérez, featured in Wonder Woman (Vol. 2) #168–169. The story's name is derived from the epic poem Paradise Lost by John Milton.

== Background ==
This was Jimenez's second story arc under his run on Wonder Woman, with the first being the "Gods of Gotham" four-issue story arc from Wonder Woman (Vol. 2) #164–167, which he co-wrote with J. M. DeMatteis. Jiminez co-wrote this story arc with George Pérez, best known to have rebooted Wonder Woman in 1987 first with the "Gods and Mortals" story arc. It was Pérez's first return to the book since 1992. It would not be until issue #171 that Jimenez became the book's sole writer.

== Plot ==
While the feud between Princess Diana and Queen Hippolyta continues, because of Diana's role as Wonder Woman and not Queen of Themyscira, another feud arises between the Themysciran Amazons and their Bana-Mighdall Amazon sisters. It is not long until the feud leads to a civil war on Paradise Island between the two tribes breaking out. The war comes to a head as Magala from Bana-Mighdall, the architect of the conflict, is revealed to be none other than Ariadne, in her plot for revenge against the Amazons. With the help of Fury, Ariadne is defeated, and mother and daughter stop the war between the two above the skies with the promise of starting change. They start by shocking everyone with the abolition of the Themysciran Royal Family as both Hippolyta and Diana lay down their titles as Queen and Princess, thus resolving the differences that have long festered between the Amazons of Paradise Island and the Bana-Mighdalls. But even after all that, Hippolyta continues to fight alongside the Justice Society of America as their own Wonder Woman.

== Aftermath ==
The ramifications of this two-parter would continue up to issue #177. During that time, there was a bit of mother/daughter feuding between Diana and Queen Hippolyta, mainly due to Hippolyta being a Wonder Woman (aka the Golden Age Wonder Woman, as she had battles during World War II). The feud is left unresolved when DC Comics's crossover of 2001, "Our Worlds at War", led to Hippolyta being killed off in issue #172, before the two could reconcile. In issue #173, Diana returns to her Amazon sisters to help them before they are destroyed. Later on, in issue #177, Themyscira is rebuilt as, at that time, floating islands. When Diana becomes their princess and ambassador again, she meets her mother once more in the afterlife, and the two are given closure. Eventually, in the 2007 limited series crossover Amazons Attack!, Hippolyta returns from the grave.
