= Superguy =

Superguy was originally a creative fiction writing group on the now-defunct UMNEWS mailing list service. After UMNEWS collapsed, the mailing list became internet-based.

Originally a spinoff of another writing universe (SFStory), Superguy was a forum for the posting of original, comedic fiction based loosely on superheroes and related concepts, and is one of the first examples of a shared-fiction universe on the Internet. Superguy has the additional distinction of having been active for over two decades, with new stories posted as recently as 2011. Superguy existed during the birth of the modern Internet culture, and along with SFStory helped illustrate the potential of the medium to mainstream users right when the Internet began to actually see mainstream use. It has survived much longer than similar Internet-based shared universe writing groups, diminishing in activity along with SFStory only when the webcomic trend became widespread.

== Alumni ==
- Jimmy Wales was an early contributor and collaborator, in part because a number of the people involved with UMNEWS's SUPERGUY list were also involved with the same server's POLITICS list. Wales was one of the regulars of that list, and there was considerable cross-pollination between the two.
- Randy Milholland of Something Positive wrote for Superguy from 1995 through 1998. He has been known to put references to his Superguy writing into Something Positive, including A cameo by his lead character Betty Yeh.
- Eric Burns of Websnark was one of the first and most prolific writers for Superguy, having contributed to the very first digest, and writing from 1989 through 1996 regularly, with sporadic entries following. Burns has more than once drawn comparisons between modern webcomics and Superguy, believing that Superguy and other fiction lists like it filled the same niche as webcomics before the web made sharing graphics simple.
- Ken Cooney wrote for Superguy 1990-1992 regularly with a handful of stories written in 1995, 1997, and 2009. He also wrote stories for SF (Sci-Fi) and WM (Metaworld). His series included: Legion of Stuperheroes, Quarters Quarterly, Stan the Toilet Man (a 2-D plumber shot into the 3-D world) as well as MW series Mind Trekker and Slate.

== See also ==
- SFStory
