= Transformation Story Archive =

Archive website of works regarding transformation in fiction

The Transformation Story Archive (TSA) was a website archiving amateur fiction featuring a personal physical transformation or its aftermath. The archive was created by Austrian web designer Thomas Hassan, who intended it to be a premier showcase for transformation-themed fiction and a showcase for amateur authors. The TSA was operating at least as early as May 1995, leading to claims of being the earliest Internet archive for fiction of this genre.

== Included content ==
Although a wide variety of metamorphoses were considered suitable content for inclusion, transgender and furry wish-fulfillment stories predominated. The archive's community also created or fostered a large number of shared universe fiction settings, in part due to a prohibition against traditional fanfiction. One of the biggest of these, Tales from the Blind Pig, was represented by hundreds of stories contributed by dozens of authors over the life of the archive. Some stories on the archive contained controversial themes, such as age regression or overtly sexual content.

== History ==
During its heyday, the TSA inspired the creation of countless similar sites, often with narrower focuses. Its high volume of amateur fiction also led to its inclusion in lists of ezines, although it was never actually structured in that manner. In 1997, eSCENE, an annual award anthology for works first published in ezines, invited nominations from the TSA, and considered 17 such stories, the most from any single source. Fiction written in the TSA's shared universes have at times also been accepted in unrelated online anthologies. Its content has been cited as inspiration or influence by others in the genres the archive included, from the USENET community that pioneered modern therianthropy to creators of webcomics such as Zebra Girl.

== Accusations ==
The success of the TSA accounted for a significant portion of the Internet traffic of its non-profit server in Vienna, run by hosting service public netbase/t0. A shift to the right in Austrian politics worked against the site and its host, however. Austrian Freedom Party (FPÖ) leader Jörg Haider selected "degenerate art" as one target for his party's political capital. By July 1998, this included accusations of the acceptance and facilitation of child pornography against public netbase/t0. Initially, the FPÖ explicitly alleged links between public netbase/t0 and a separate hosting service from the British Virgin Islands, but the sexual content of the TSA and its age-alteration themes was implicitly included when allegations continued after that connection was refuted. When the results of these attacks stripped its host of public funding and free access, the TSA hastily relocated to an American server, assisted by several mirror servers.

== Server relocation ==
However, the TSA would never recover as a community from the server relocation. The shift from Austrian to North American hosting led to the departure of Hassan from the project; he went on to join Austrian software developer Public Voice Lab, eventually earning a seat on their board. Posting of new content to the archive finally stopped in July 2003 and the archive's users have largely moved to other websites or dropped from public view, although the site remains available as of April 2026. Much of the content has been redistributed, both during and after the TSA's active existence, however. Its sister-project mailing list continued under separate administration long after the stagnation of the actual web archive, and an ezine continued for some years, hosted on the current TSA server (and still there for archival purposes). And, despite its long inactivity, the TSA remains on most lists of sources for furry, transgender, or metamorphosis-themed fiction, and still receives occasional mention in wider indexes of online fiction sites.

== Archive ==
Although the original archive has been inactive since 2003, the TSA Mailing list still sees new stories added regularly by old members of the TSA community, as well as newcomers. A project by members of the mailing list to produce a successor to the original Transformation Story Archive was started in 2007 at Shifti.org.
