= DargonZine =

Online fantasy periodical

DargonZine is a periodically published ezine or online magazine. Formerly called FSFnet (Fantasy and Science Fiction on the Internet), DargonZine caters to readers of fantasy and science fiction literature and was first published in December 1984 on the co-operative university network BITNET. It releases 4-10 issues a year, and its International Standard Serial Number (ISSN) is 1080-9910.
