= Red ball =

Red ball or Red Ball may refer to:

== Entertainment ==
- Red ball, an impending murder, in the 2002 science fiction film Minority Report
- "Red Ball" (Law & Order), a 2005 episode of the American television series Law & Order
- "The Red Ball", a 2010 episode of the American animated television series The Boondocks
- Red Ball Express (film), a 1952 American movie based on the World War II military truck convoy system

== Sports ==
- Red ball, a ball used in snooker or billiards, see glossary of cue sports terms
- Red ball, a red cricket ball used in test matches

== Transportation ==
- American Red Ball, an American moving company founded in 1919
- Red Ball Express, an American military truck convoy system used in Europe after D-Day in the summer of 1944
- Red Ball Route, an early American auto trail, c. 1913, now part of U.S. Route 218 in Iowa

== Other uses ==
- Red Ball (event), an annual charity fashion event for AIDS Awareness, established in 2008
- Red ball or redball, jargon for a high-profile police case that draws media and political attention, often used in the 1991 book Homicide: A Year on the Killing Streets
- Red Ball Garage, a historic building located in Swedesburg, Iowa, U.S.

== See also ==
- Red Balloon (disambiguation)
- Red Bull (disambiguation)
