= Theo Bialek =

American visual effects artist

- Occupation: Visual effects artist

Theo Bialek is an American visual effects artist. He was nominated for an Academy Award in the category Best Visual Effects for the film Guardians of the Galaxy Vol. 3.

== Selected filmography ==
- Stuart Little (1999)
- Stuart Little 2 (2002)
- The Polar Express (2004)
- Monster House (2006)
- Green Lantern (2011)
- The Amazing Spider-Man (2012)
- The Amazing Spider-Man 2 (2014)
- Spider-Man: Homecoming (2017)
- Spider-Man: Far From Home (2019)
- Doctor Strange in the Multiverse of Madness (2022)
- Guardians of the Galaxy Vol. 3 (2023; co-nominated with Stéphane Ceretti, Alexis Wajsbrot and Guy Williams)
