= Charles E. Hult House, Summer Kitchen and Wood Shed =

Historic house in Iowa, United States

- U.S. National Register of Historic Places
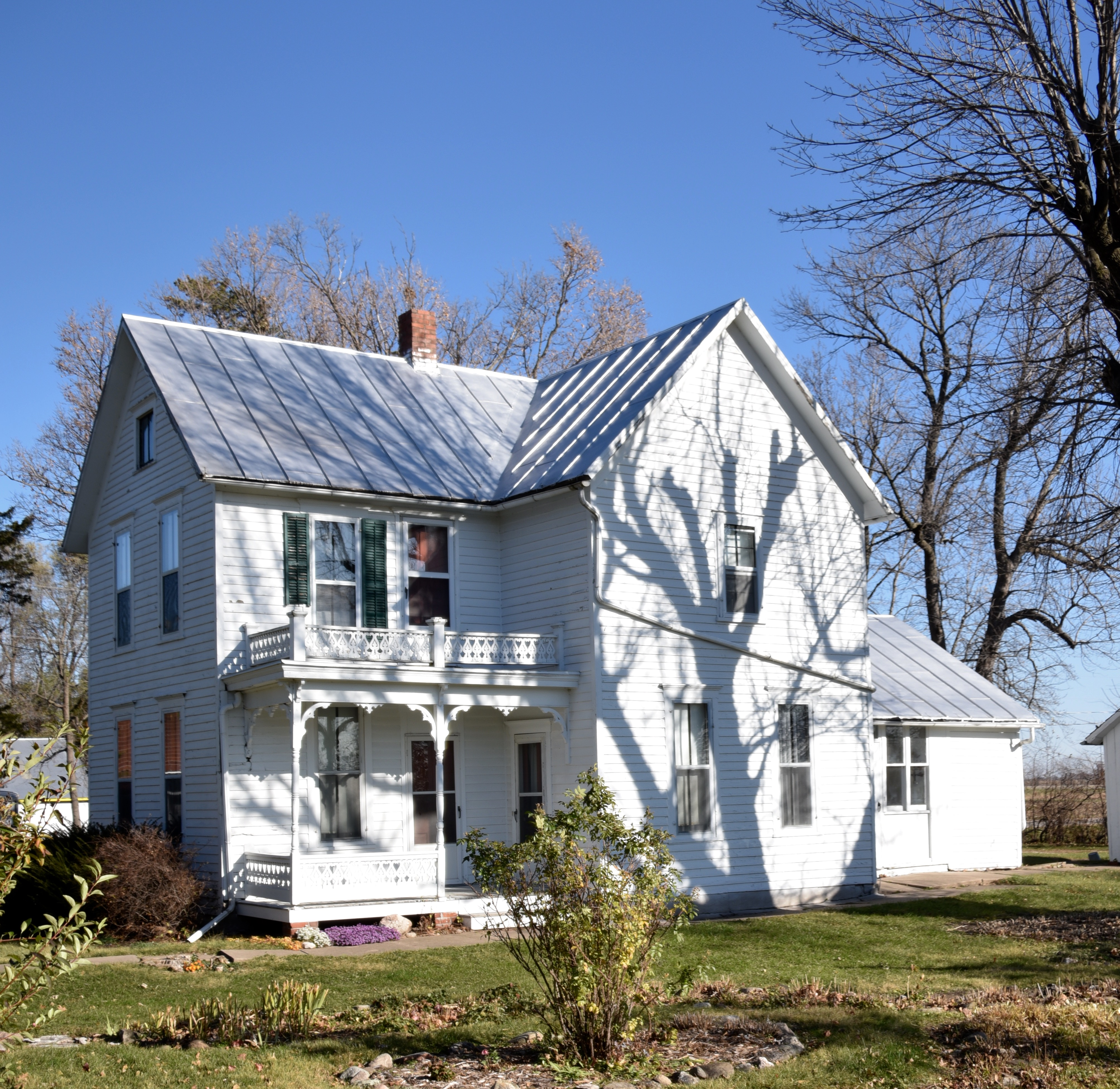

- Location within Iowa Location within the United States
- Location: 1904 140th St. Swedesburg, Iowa
- Coordinates: 41°06′16.2″N 91°32′44.4″W
- Area: less than one acre
- Built: 1867, 1882, 1890
- Architectural style: Late Victorian
- MPS: Henry County, Iowa MPS
- NRHP reference No.: 99000830
- Added to NRHP: July 15, 1999

The Charles E. Hult House, Summer Kitchen and Wood Shed are historic buildings located in Swedesburg, Iowa, United States.

Hult was a native of Jämshög in Sweden who emigrated to the United States in 1854. He initially settled in Illinois and fought in the Union Army during the American Civil War. He relocated to Iowa in 1866 and settled on this 80-acre (32 ha) farm, making the Hult's among the first Swedish settlers in Wayne Township. They settled here after the Lutheran Church across the road was founded, but before the village of Swedesburg was established. Hult built the original part of the house in 1867, and expanded it to two stories around 1882 and added the kitchen wing. Charles and Charlotta were known for their hospitality. New settlers waiting for their own houses to be built, clergy who came here for conferences, travelers in need of rescue from the poor roads after a storm, and visitors to the community from Sweden all found accommodation here. The house became known as the "Swedesburg Hotel." After Charles and Charlotta died, their son Albert and his family lived in the house followed by his daughter Inez.

The house is a common residential form known as Folk Victorian. The summer kitchen behind the house was used for canning and baking. It and the wood shed were built about 1890. The three buildings were listed on the National Register of Historic Places in 1999.
