= Alexis Wajsbrot =

French film director, producer, and VFX artist

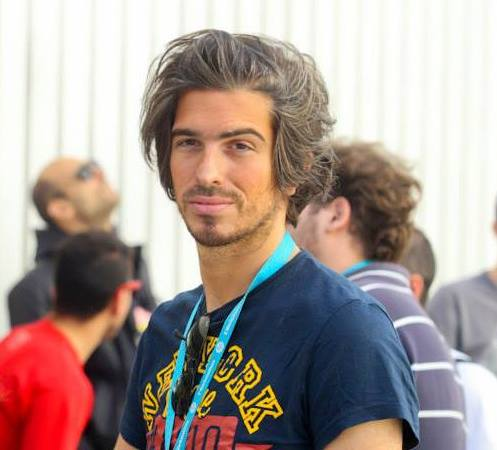
- Wajsbrot in 2013
- Born: Alexis Mickael Wajsbrot; Paris, France
- Occupations: Film director, Visual effects supervisor, screenwriter
- Years active: 2002–present

Alexis Mickael Wajsbrot is a French film director, producer, and visual effects supervisor best known for his 2016 horror film Don't Hang Up.

Wajsbrot's directorial debut was the short film Red Balloon, a 13-minute thriller, which he co-directed. In 2010 he won the Directorial Discovery Award at the Rhode Island International Horror Film Festival and 35 selections in others.

As well as being a director, Wajsbrot is a visual effects supervisor at Framestore. In 2014 he won a Visual Effect Society Award on Alfonso Cuarón's Gravity for Outstanding FX and Simulation Animation in a Live Action Motion Picture.

In 2024, Wajsbrot was nominated for an Academy Award in the category Best Visual Effects for the film Guardians of the Galaxy Vol. 3. His nomination was shared with Stéphane Ceretti, Guy Williams and Theo Bialek.

== Filmography ==
Year	Title	Director	Role
2027	Harry Potter	Mark Mylod	Production Visual Effects Supervisor
2024	Paddington in Peru	Dougal Wilson	Production Visual Effects Supervisor
2023	Guardians of the Galaxy Vol. 3	James Gunn	Visual Effects Supervisor
2022	Doctor Strange in the Multiverse of Madness	Sam Raimi	Visual Effects Supervisor
2022	Picture Book	Alexis Wajsbrot and Damien Mace	Director
2021	Spider-Man: No Way Home	Jon Watts	Additional Visual Effects Supervisor
2020	Wonder Woman 1984	Patty Jenkins	Visual Effects Supervisor
2020	How I Became a Super Hero	Douglas Attal	Production Visual Effects Supervisor
2019	Spider-Man: Far From Home	Jon Watts	Visual Effects Supervisor
2018	Mary Poppins Returns	Rob Marshall	Additional Visual Effects Supervisor
2017	Thor Ragnarok	Taika Waititi	Visual Effects Supervisor
2017	Don't Hang Up	Alexis Wajsbrot and Damien Mace	Director / Visual Effects Supervisor
2017	Geostorm	Dean Devlin	CG Supervisor
2016	Doctor Strange	Scott Derrickson	CG Supervisor
2014	Paddington	Paul King	CG Supervisor
2014	Men, Women & Children	Jason Reitman	CG Supervisor
2014	Edge of Tomorrow	Doug Liman	CG Supervisor
2013	The Secret Life of Walter Mitty	Ben Stiller	CG Supervisor
2013	Percy Jackson: Sea of Monsters	Thor Freudenthal	CG Supervisor
2013	Iron Man 3	Shane Black	CG Supervisor
2013	Gravity	Alfonso Cuarón	CG Effects Supervisor
2011	Your Highness	David Gordon Green	FX Lead
2010	Red Balloon	Alexis Wajsbrot and Damien Mace	Director / Visual Effects Supervisor
2010	Prince of Persia	Mike Newell	FX Lead
2010	The Wolfman	Joe Johnston	Senior FX TD
2009	G.I. Joe: The Rise of Cobra	Stephen Sommers	Senior FX TD
2009	Harry Potter and the Half-Blood Prince	David Yates	FX Lead
2008	Cloverfield (Viral Marketing)	Matt Reeves	Senior FX TD
2007	Harry Potter and the Order of the Phoenix	David Yates	Senior FX TD
2007	Sweeney Todd: The Demon Barber of Fleet Street	Tim Burton	Senior FX TD
2005	Somne	Isidro Ortiz	CG Artist
2005	20 Centimetros	Ramón Salazar	CG Artist
