= Red Balloon =

Red Balloon or Red Balloons may refer to:

== Film ==
- The Red Balloon, a 1956 French short film
- Flight of the Red Balloon, a 2007 film based on the 1956 short film
- Red Balloon (2010 film), a 2010 thriller short film directed by Alexis Wajsbrot and Damien Mace

== Music ==
- "Red Balloon", a song by Tim Hardin
- Red Balloon, an album by Sandra McCracken
- "Red Balloon", a song by Charli XCX, from the album Sucker
- "The Red Balloon" (song), a song by the Dave Clark Five

== Other uses ==
- The 2009 DARPA Network Challenge (also known as the Red Balloon Challenge), involving spotting 10 red balloons in the Continental United States.
- Red Balloon, a 1922 painting by Paul Klee
- Red Balloon Learner Centres, an educational charity
- Red Balloon a First Capital Connect train named after the Red Balloon Learner Centres
- RedBalloon, an online experience gift retailer based in Australia.
- Red Balloon (TV series), a 2022 South Korean television series
