= Swedesburg, Iowa =

- Census-designated place
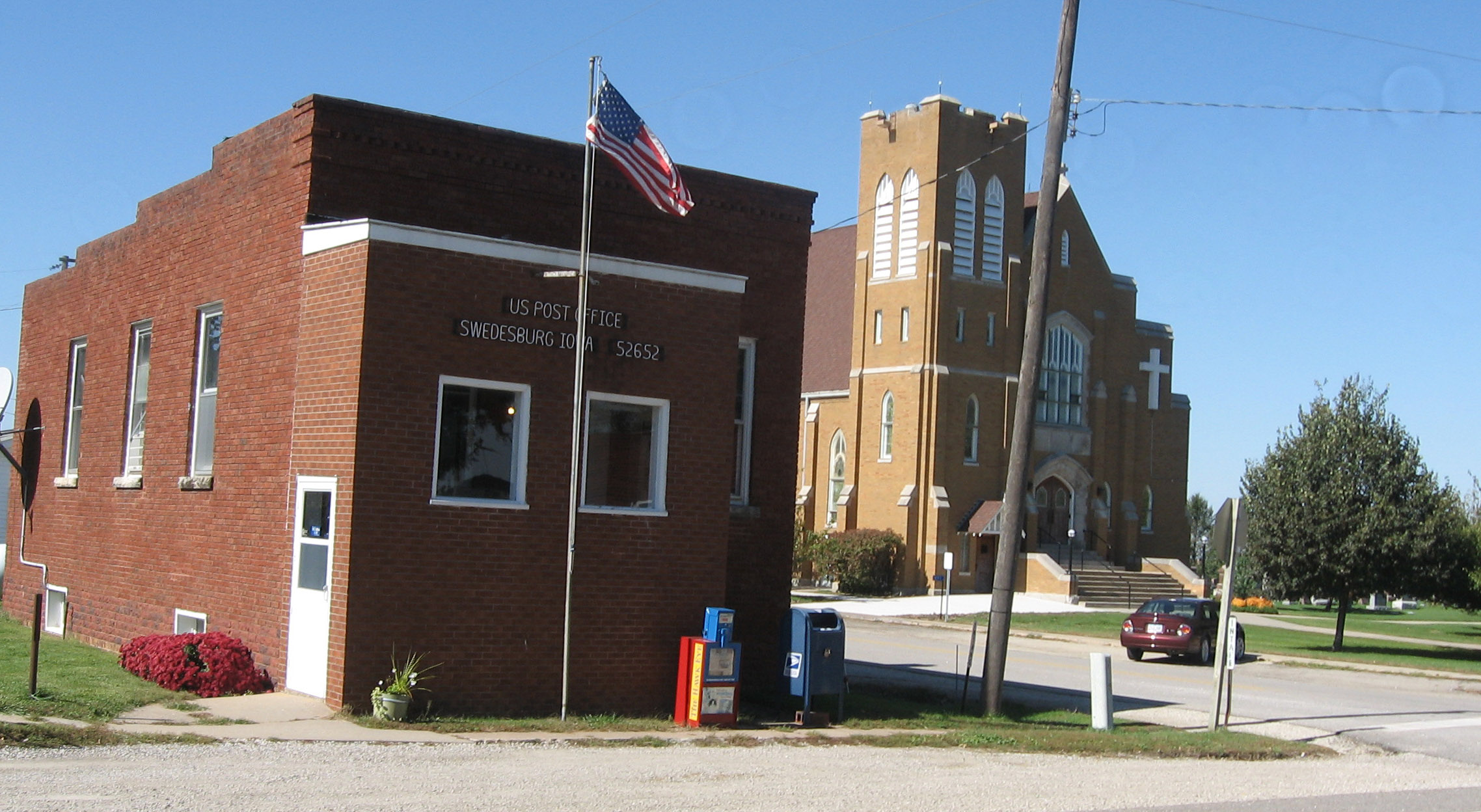
- Church and Post Office in Swedesburg, Iowa

- Location within Iowa Location within the United States
- Coordinates: 41°06′22″N 91°33′12″W
- Country: United States
- State: Iowa
- County: Henry

Area
  - Total: 2.31 sq mi (5.97 km^{2})
  - Land: 2.31 sq mi (5.97 km^{2})
  - Water: 0 sq mi (0.00 km^{2})
- Elevation: 735 ft (224 m)

Population (2020)
  - Total: 99
  - Density: 43.0/sq mi (16.59/km^{2})
- Time zone: UTC-6 (Central (CST))
  - Summer (DST): UTC-5 (CDT)
- ZIP codes: 52652
- FIPS code: 19-76800
- GNIS feature ID: 2804140

Swedesburg is an unincorporated community and census-designated place (CDP) in northern Henry County, Iowa, United States. It was first listed as a CDP prior to the 2020 census. As of the 2020 census, Swedesburg had a population of 99.

== Location ==
Swedesburg is in north central Henry County just west of US Route 218 nine miles north of Mount Pleasant.

== History ==
Swedesburg was originally built up chiefly by Swedish immigrants. They first arrived in the region in the 1860s after a wave of migration to the nearby Jefferson County in the 1840s.

The population was 75 in 1940.

== Landmarks ==
The Swedish American Museum, which commemorates the community's Swedish heritage, is in the former Farmers Union Exchange Building which dates from the 1920s.

The following buildings are on the National Register of Historic Places:

- Swedish Evangelical Lutheran Church
- John Hultquist House
- Charles E. Hult House, Summer Kitchen and Wood Shed
- Red Ball Garage

== Education ==
It is in the Waco Community School District.

== Literature ==
The author Bill Bryson mentions Swedesburg in his 2006 memoir, The Life and Times of the Thunderbolt Kid. Bryson recalls seeing Swedesburg from a distance whilst visiting his grandparents in nearby Winfield in the 1950s, and reflects how the heritages of settlements such as Swedesburg were affected by the policies of Governor William L. Harding, which resulted in the decline of European languages in the state.

== Demographics ==
Historical population
Census	Pop.	Note	%±
2020	99		—
U.S. Decennial Census

=== 2020 census ===
As of the census of 2020, there were 99 people, 41 households, and 33 families residing in the community. The population density was 43.0 inhabitants per square mile (16.6/km^{2}). There were 51 housing units at an average density of 22.1 per square mile (8.5/km^{2}). The racial makeup of the community was 89.9% White, 0.0% Black or African American, 2.0% Native American, 4.0% Asian, 0.0% Pacific Islander, 0.0% from other races and 4.0% from two or more races. Hispanic or Latino persons of any race comprised 0.0% of the population.

Of the 41 households, 34.1% of which had children under the age of 18 living with them, 58.5% were married couples living together, 7.3% were cohabitating couples, 14.6% had a female householder with no spouse or partner present and 19.5% had a male householder with no spouse or partner present. 19.5% of all households were non-families. 19.5% of all households were made up of individuals, 7.3% had someone living alone who was 65 years old or older.

The median age in the community was 41.1 years. 26.3% of the residents were under the age of 20; 4.0% were between the ages of 20 and 24; 25.3% were from 25 and 44; 26.3% were from 45 and 64; and 18.2% were 65 years of age or older. The gender makeup of the community was 40.4% male and 59.6% female.
