= John Hultquist House =

Historic house in Iowa, United States

- U.S. National Register of Historic Places
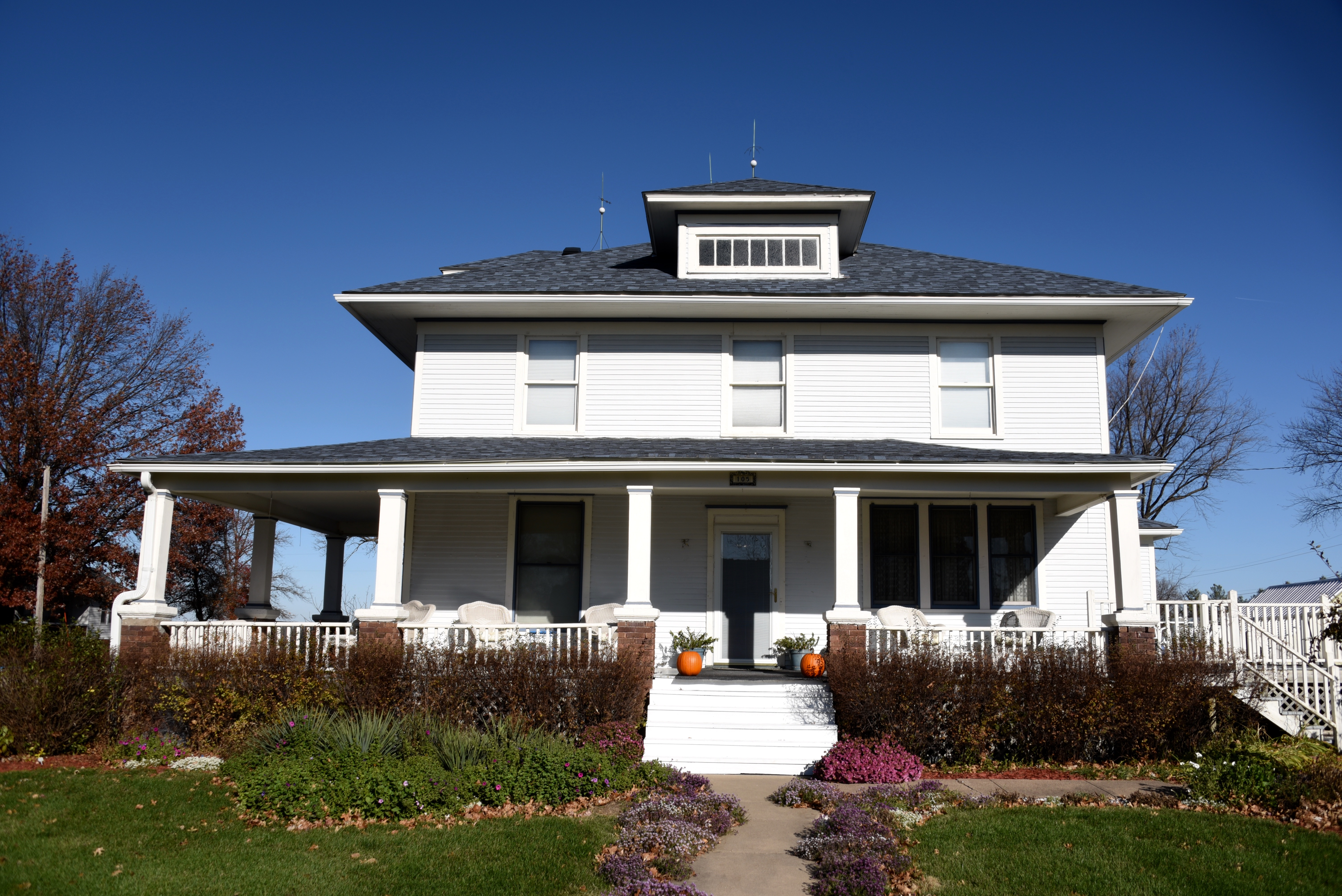

- Location within Iowa Location within the United States
- Location: 105 Park St. Swedesburg, Iowa
- Coordinates: 41°06′16.2″N 91°32′44.4″W
- Area: less than one acre
- Built: 1918
- Built by: C.K. Schantz
- Architectural style: Late 19th and Early 20th Century American Movements
- NRHP reference No.: 99000828
- Added to NRHP: July 15, 1999

The John Hultquist House is a historic building located in Swedesburg, Iowa, United States. Hultquist was a native of Småland in Sweden who immigrated to the United States in 1880. After working for the Chicago, Burlington and Quincy Railroad he began farming and he was eventually able to buy 200 acres (81 ha) of land for his own farm north of town. In 1918 Hultquist employed C.K. Schantz to build this two-story, frame, American Foursquare for him and his second wife Amanda after his retirement. It was fairly common for the early Swedish immigrants in Wayne Township to relocate to Swedesburg after they retired from farming so as to maintain their Swedish traditions. The house was listed on the National Register of Historic Places in 1999. The historic designation also includes a small barn to the east of the house. The front gable structure originally housed horses, a cow and chickens.
