= Guardians of the Galaxy Vol. 3 =

2023 Marvel Studios film

- Theatrical release poster
- Directed by: James Gunn
- Written by: James Gunn
- Based on: Marvel Comics
- Produced by: Kevin Feige
- Starring: Chris Pratt; Zoe Saldaña; Dave Bautista; Karen Gillan; Pom Klementieff; Vin Diesel; Bradley Cooper; Will Poulter; Sean Gunn; Chukwudi Iwuji; Linda Cardellini; Nathan Fillion; Sylvester Stallone
- Cinematography: Henry Braham
- Edited by: Fred Raskin; Greg D'Auria
- Music by: John Murphy
- Production company: Marvel Studios
- Distributed by: Walt Disney Studios Motion Pictures
- Release dates: April 22, 2023 (Disneyland Paris); May 5, 2023 (United States)
- Running time: 150 minutes
- Country: United States
- Language: English
- Budget: $250 million
- Box office: $845.6 million

Guardians of the Galaxy Vol. 3 (marketed as Guardians of the Galaxy Volume 3) is a 2023 American superhero film based on Marvel Comics featuring the superhero team Guardians of the Galaxy. Produced by Marvel Studios and distributed by Walt Disney Studios Motion Pictures, it is the sequel to Guardians of the Galaxy (2014) and Guardians of the Galaxy Vol. 2 (2017), and the 32nd film in the Marvel Cinematic Universe (MCU). Written and directed by James Gunn, it features an ensemble cast including Chris Pratt, Zoe Saldaña, Dave Bautista, Karen Gillan, Pom Klementieff, Vin Diesel, Bradley Cooper, Will Poulter, Sean Gunn, Chukwudi Iwuji, Linda Cardellini, Nathan Fillion, and Sylvester Stallone. In the film, the other Guardians race to save the life of Rocket (Cooper) from his creator, the High Evolutionary (Iwuji), who is an alien scientist trying to perfect the universe.

By November 2014, James Gunn had initial ideas for a third and final Guardians of the Galaxy film, and he announced in April 2017 that he would return to write and direct it ahead of Vol. 2's release. Vol. 3 explores the origin story of Rocket, with whom Gunn personally identifies. Disney fired Gunn from Vol. 3 in July 2018 after controversial jokes he made on Twitter resurfaced. Gunn received support from several cast members, and the studio reversed course by that October. His return was publicly revealed in March 2019, and he restarted work on the film after completing his film The Suicide Squad (2021) and the first season of its spin-off series Peacemaker (2022) for DC Films. New cast members, including Iwuji and Poulter, joined by the start of filming, which took place at Trilith Studios in Atlanta, Georgia, from November 2021 to May 2022.

Guardians of the Galaxy Vol. 3 premiered at Disneyland Paris on April 22, 2023, and was released in the United States on May 5, as part of Phase Five of the MCU. Like its predecessors, it was a critical and commercial success, with many critics deeming it to be a satisfactory conclusion to the trilogy. It grossed over $845.6 million worldwide, becoming the fourth-highest-grossing film of 2023. At the 96th Academy Awards, the film was nominated for Best Visual Effects.

== Plot ==
At their new headquarters on Knowhere, the Guardians of the Galaxy are attacked by Adam Warlock, a Sovereign warrior created by High Priestess Ayesha who seeks to destroy them for stealing from her. (Note: As depicted in Guardians of the Galaxy Vol. 2 (2017)) After critically wounding Rocket, Adam is stabbed by Nebula and flees. The Guardians' med-packs are ineffective at healing Rocket's wounds due to a kill switch embedded in him by the organization Orgocorp. The Guardians travel to Orgocorp's headquarters to find the switch's override code and save Rocket's life.

As Rocket lies dying, he recalls his past. He was found and experimented on as a baby raccoon by the High Evolutionary, leader of Orgocorp, who aimed to enhance and anthropomorphize animal lifeforms into "Humanimals" for an ideal society, Counter-Earth. Rocket's fellow Batch 89 test subjects included the otter Lylla, walrus Teefs, and rabbit Floor. Rocket's insights were used to improve later batches of Humanimals, although the High Evolutionary was angry that one of his creations could solve a problem that he could not. The High Evolutionary planned to harvest Rocket's brain and incinerate all of Batch 89. Rocket tried to rescue his friends, but the High Evolutionary killed Lylla and mocked Rocket's grief. Enraged, Rocket attacked the High Evolutionary while henchmen killed Teefs and Floor during the chaos. Rocket killed the henchmen and then escaped in a spaceship.

In the present, an alternate version of Gamora, (Note: Introduced through time travel in Avengers: Endgame (2019)) who has joined the Ravagers, helps the Guardians infiltrate Orgocorp. They retrieve Rocket's file but discover that Theel, one of the High Evolutionary's advisors, has removed the override code. The Guardians and Gamora travel to Counter-Earth to find him. They are followed by Ayesha and Adam after the High Evolutionary, their race's creator, threatened to wipe out the Sovereign if they failed to retrieve Rocket. At Counter-Earth, Drax and Mantis remain with Gamora and Rocket while Peter Quill, Groot, and Nebula go to the High Evolutionary's Arête Laboratories complex. Guards force Nebula to wait outside due to her cybernetic enhancements; Quill and Groot enter Arête. Drax tricks Mantis into pursuing Quill's group and Gamora saves Rocket from Adam and War Pig, one of the High Evolutionary's Hellspawn guards.

The High Evolutionary agrees with Quill that Counter-Earth is imperfect and begins bombarding the entire planet, killing the Humanimals and Ayesha. Arête, which is actually a spaceship, departs as Nebula, Drax, and Mantis board it to rescue Quill and Groot. However, the latter pair jump off the spaceship with Theel, whom they kill before retrieving the override code from his corpse. They are rescued by Gamora on their ship. As they use the code, Rocket flatlines and has a near-death experience in which he reunites with Lylla, Teefs, and Floor. Lylla tells him his time has not yet come, and Quill succeeds in disabling the kill switch and restarting Rocket's heart.

Drax, Nebula, and Mantis encounter the High Evolutionary's next batch of test subjects—genetically modified humanoid children—before they are captured. The other Guardians orchestrate a rescue, which leads to a battle against the High Evolutionary's forces. Kraglin opens fire on Arête with Knowhere and then helps to save Knowhere citizens from a counter-attack by the High Evolutionary's Hellspawn. Intent on retreat, the High Evolutionary's crew mutinies, but their leader kills them. Drax, Nebula, and Mantis befriend three monstrous Abilisks to escape and reunite with the rest of the Guardians. The Guardians delay leaving Arête, choosing to rescue the children, who escape to Knowhere via a tunnel constructed by Cosmo's telekinesis. Rocket discovers imprisoned animals on the ship and is confronted by the High Evolutionary, whom the other Guardians defeat. Rocket spares the High Evolutionary, (Note: Director James Gunn confirmed that the film shows the High Evolutionary being rescued by Drax during the evacuation of the ship, with the High Evolutionary later being imprisoned on Knowhere off-screen.) and the Guardians help the animals escape to Knowhere. Quill nearly dies trying to reach Knowhere but is saved by Adam, whom Groot had earlier rescued from Arête's destruction.

Quill decides to leave the Guardians, names Rocket as the new captain, and reunites with his grandfather Jason on Earth. Mantis embarks on a journey of self-discovery with the Abilisks, Gamora rejoins the Ravagers, and Nebula and Drax remain on Knowhere to raise the rescued children. The new Guardians—Rocket, Groot, Kraglin, Cosmo, Adam, Phyla (one of the rescued children), and Adam's pet Blurp—later take on a mission.

== Cast ==
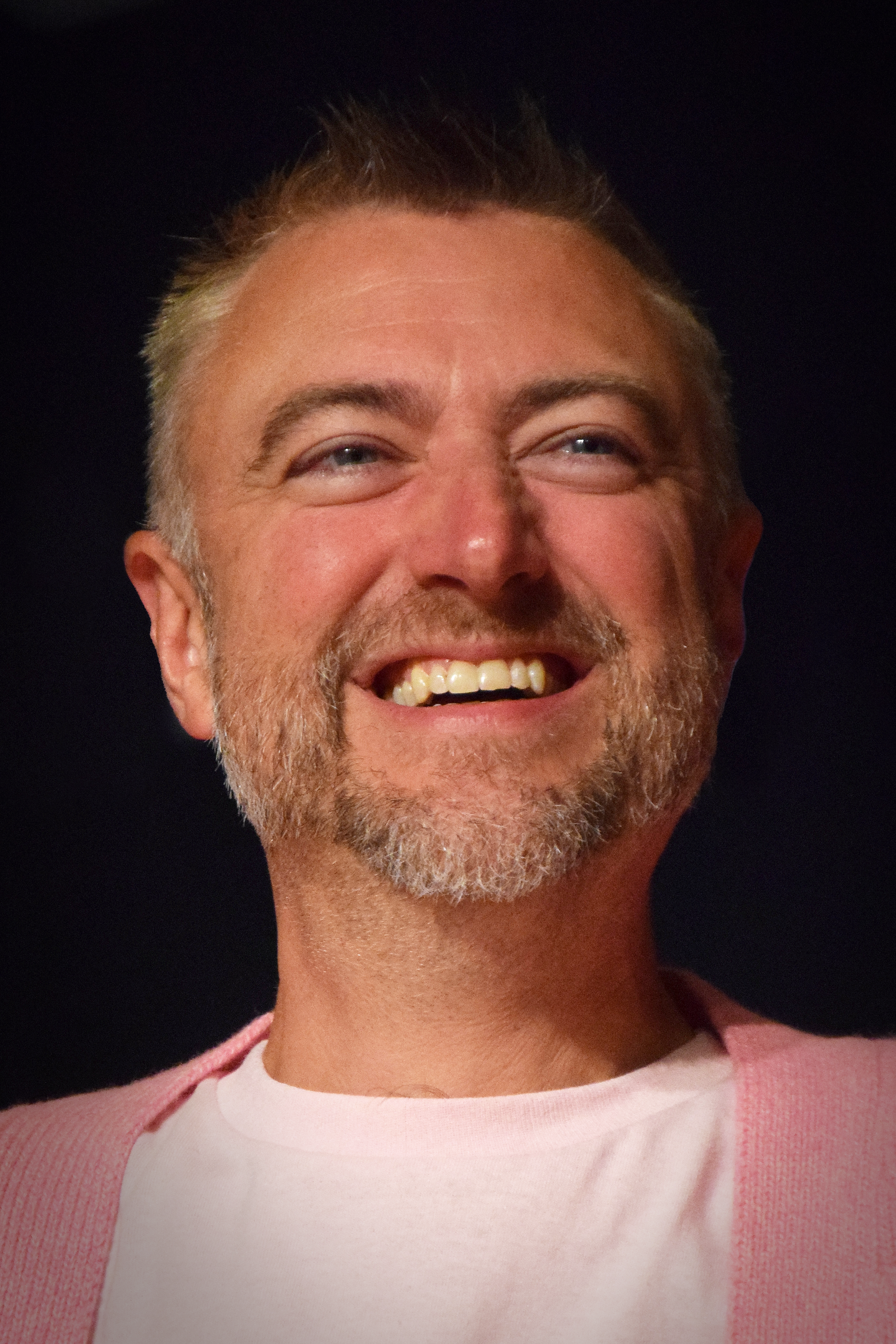
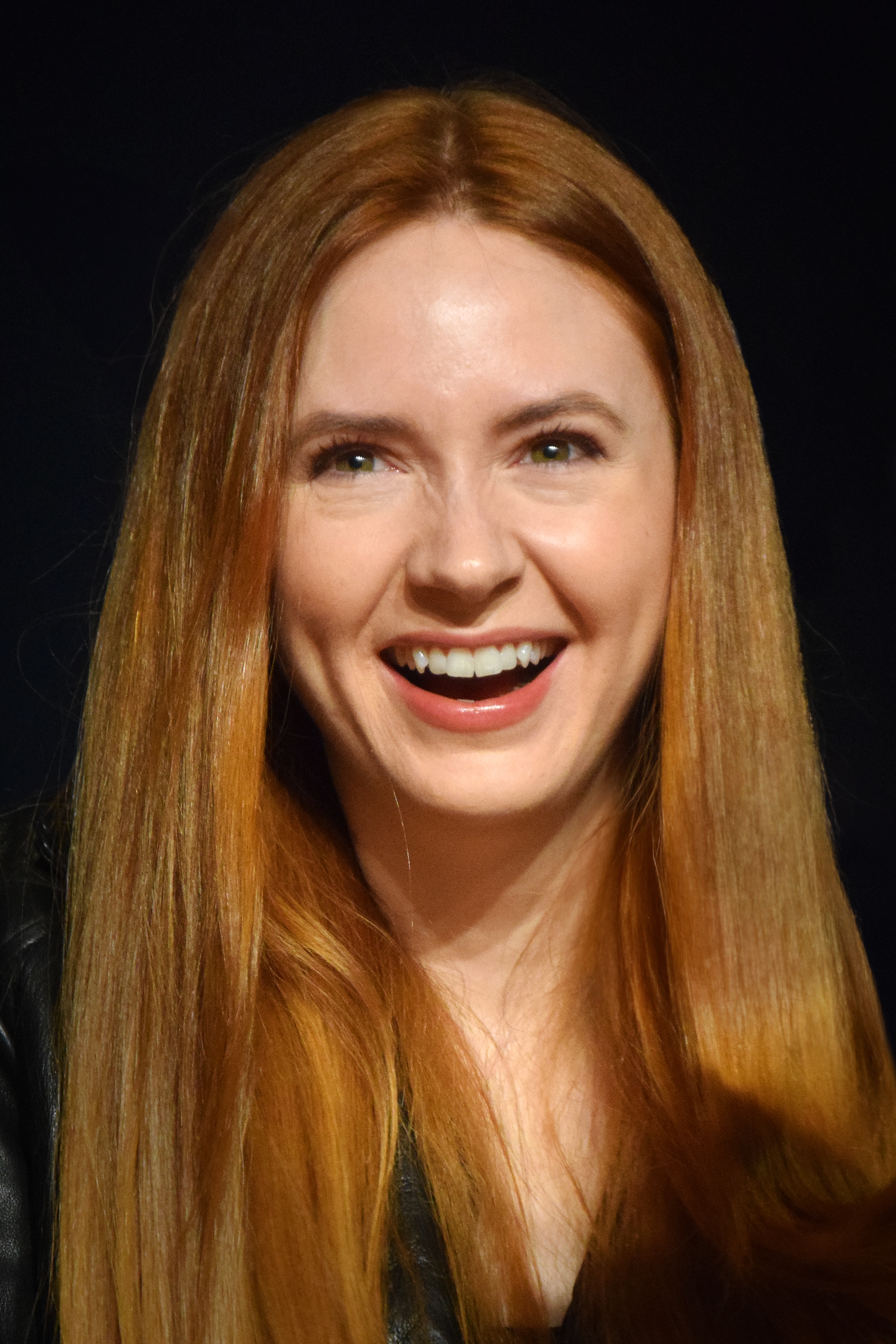
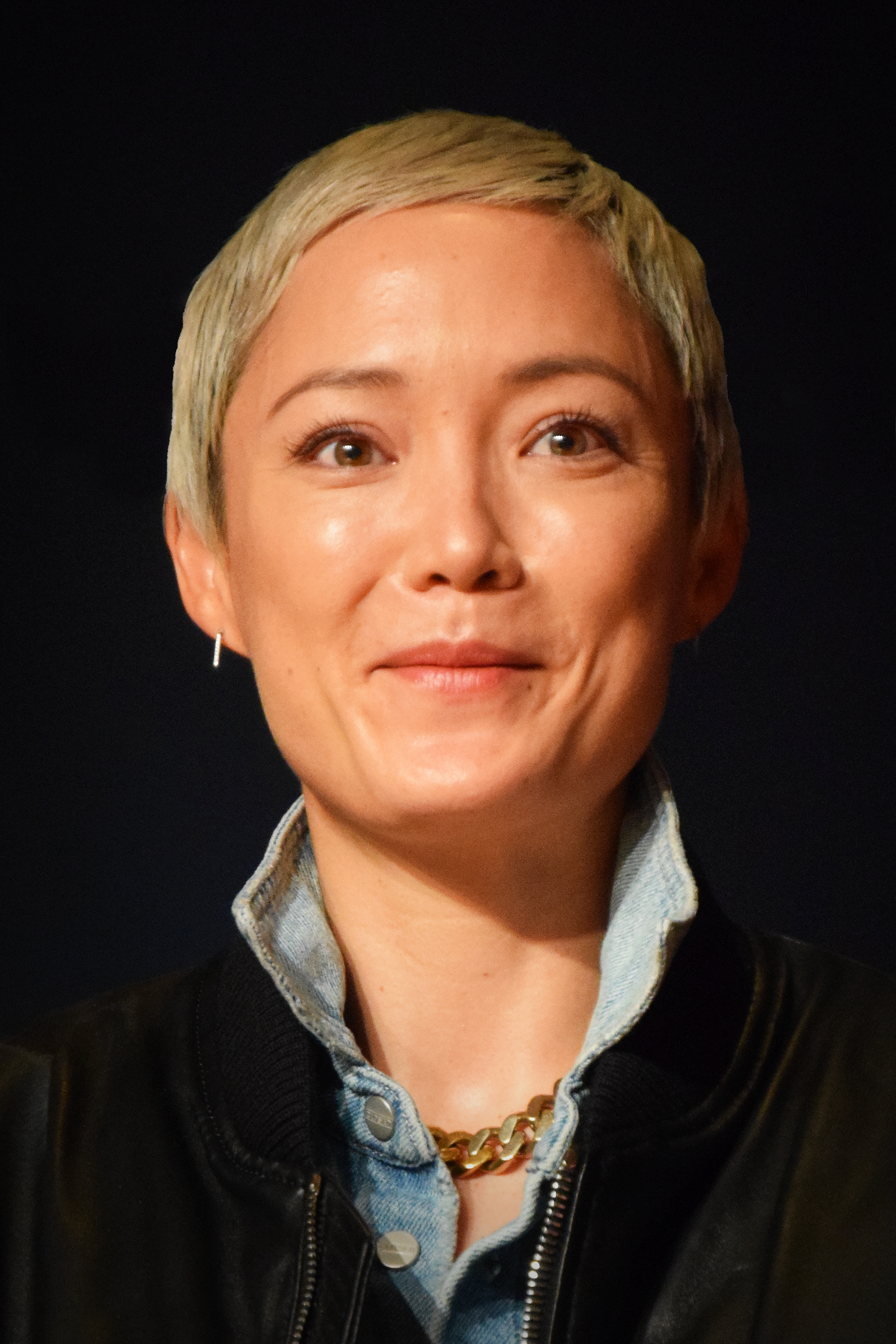
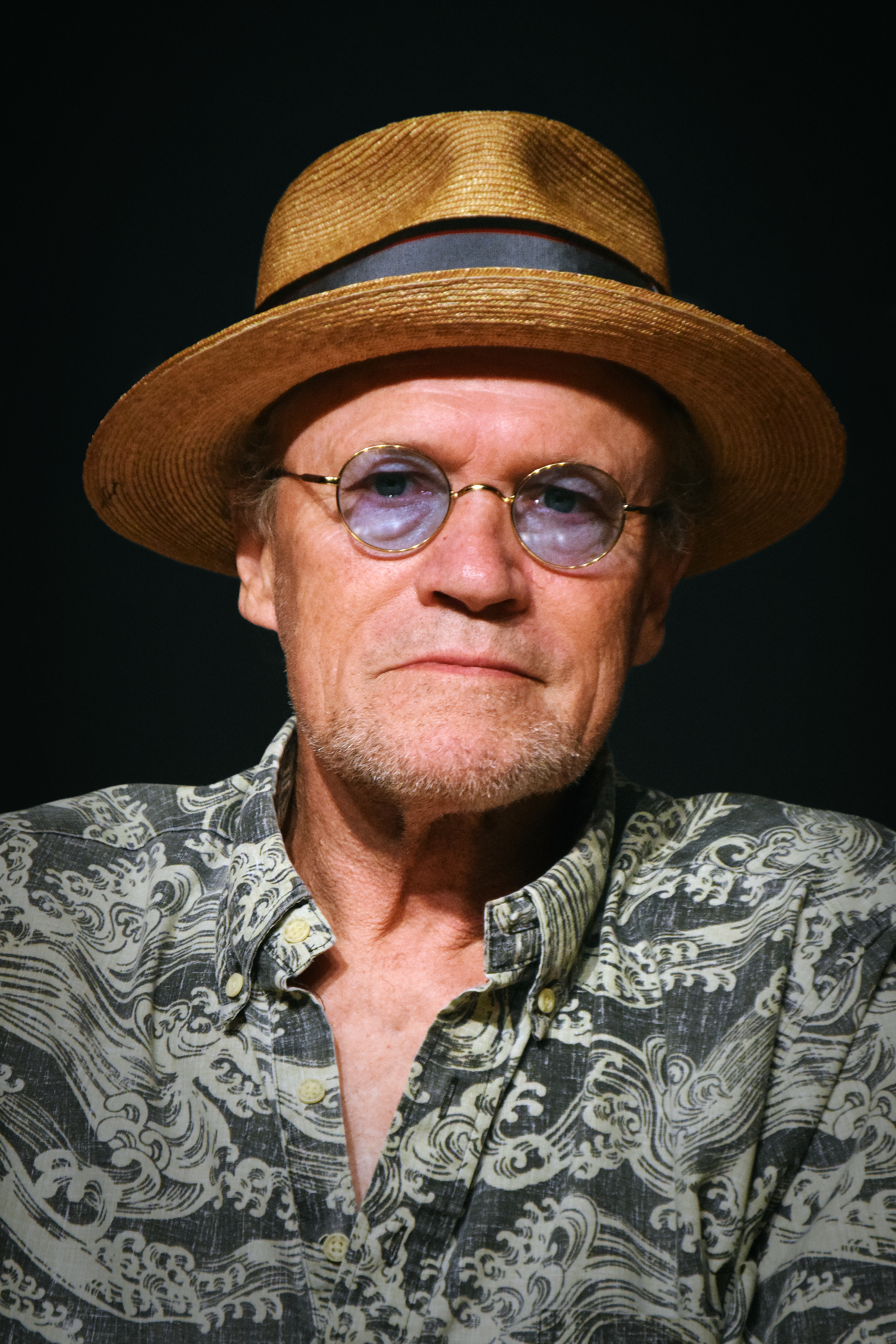
Cast members Sean Gunn, Karen Gillan, Michael Rooker, and Pom Klementieff at the 2023 New York Comic Con
- Chris Pratt as Peter Quill / Star-Lord:
  The half-human, half-Celestial leader of the Guardians of the Galaxy who was abducted from Earth as a child and raised by a group of alien thieves and smugglers, the Ravagers. In the film, Quill is in a "state of depression" following the appearance of a variant of his dead lover Gamora, who does not share the same affection for Quill as her older version had for him, which in turn affects his leadership of the Guardians.
- Zoe Saldaña as Gamora:
  An orphan who seeks redemption for her past crimes, and was adopted and trained by Thanos to be his personal assassin. The original version of Gamora, a member of the Guardians, was killed by Thanos in Avengers: Infinity War (2018), and an alternate version of the character traveled to the present in Avengers: Endgame (2019); Saldaña reprises the latter role in this film, now serving as a member of the Ravagers. Saldaña stated that Vol. 3 would be the final time she would portray Gamora, noting that she originally signed to play her in one film and ended up playing the role for much longer, a role she was grateful to play due to the impact it especially had on female fans.
- Dave Bautista as Drax the Destroyer:
  A member of the Guardians and a highly skilled warrior whose family was slaughtered by Ronan the Accuser, under the instructions of Thanos. Bautista stated that Vol. 3 would be the final time he would portray Drax, having been grateful for the role, while still calling it a "relief" to have concluded his time with the character, given the long hours needed to get into makeup and hoping to pursue more dramatic acting roles. Because of Bautista's decision, writer and director James Gunn opted not to include Drax in the post-credits scene.
- Karen Gillan as Nebula:
  A member of the Guardians, a former Avenger, and Gamora's adoptive sister who, similarly to her, was trained by their adoptive father Thanos to be his personal assassin. Gillan believed Nebula was developing into a "slightly different person" with more levity as she starts to heal psychologically following the death of Thanos, who was the source of her abuse and torment. Vol. 3 fulfills a character arc for the character Gunn envisioned when starting work on Guardians of the Galaxy (2014), going from a minor villain to a member of the Guardians. The film teases a possible romance between Star-Lord and Nebula, but Gunn denied having ever considered the two becoming a couple. Despite this, Gillan felt that Nebula harbors a small crush on Quill.
- Pom Klementieff as Mantis: A member of the Guardians with empathic powers, and Quill's half-sister.
- Vin Diesel as Groot:
  A member of the Guardians who is a tree-like humanoid and the accomplice of Rocket. Austin Freeman, who played Randy in the Loki season one episode "The Variant" (2021), provided on set motion-capture for Groot.
- Bradley Cooper as Rocket:
  A member of the Guardians and a former Avenger who is a genetically engineered raccoon-based bounty hunter and a master of weapons and military tactics. Gunn said that the film tells Rocket's story, including his background and "where he's going", along with how that ties into the other Guardians and the end of this iteration of the team. The film completes a character arc that was established in Guardians of the Galaxy and Guardians of the Galaxy Vol. 2 (2017), and continued in Infinity War and Endgame. Sean Gunn once again provided on set motion capture for the character, while also voicing young Rocket. Cooper also voiced adolescent Rocket while Noah Raskin voiced baby Rocket.
- Will Poulter as Adam Warlock:
  A powerful artificial being created by the Sovereign to destroy the Guardians. Given Warlock is newly born from the Sovereign's cocoon, he is "basically a baby" that "does not understand life very well". Poulter believed there was "a lot of comedy" in someone just entering the world for the first time and "trying to develop his moral compass", while also having "some genuine pathos". Gunn thought Warlock's interactions with the Guardians provided "an interesting juxtaposition" to what their journey has been, and described him as a more traditional superhero compared to the Guardians, although not necessarily a hero.
- Sean Gunn as Kraglin: A member of the Guardians and Yondu Udonta's former second-in-command in the Ravagers.
- Chukwudi Iwuji as the High Evolutionary:
  An alien cyborg scientist and CEO of OrgoCorp specializing in creating hybrid creatures and Rocket's creator, seeking to forcibly enhance all living beings into a "special race" where he has been credited as creating the Animen, the Humanimals, the Hell Spawn, the Sovereign, the Xeronians, and the Star Children. Iwuji described the character as "narcissistic, sociopathic, but very charming", adding that there was "something very Shakespearean about him, there's something very emotionally dark about him, and he's a lot of fun on top of all that". In preparation for the role, Iwuji listened to his character's taste for classical music in contrast to the American rock and pop music songs played in the film, allowing Iwuji to go back to his favorite arias and operas, like Wolfgang Amadeus Mozart's The Marriage of Figaro (1786) and Don Giovanni (1787). Gunn likened the High Evolutionary to "a space version" of Doctor Moreau from Island of Lost Souls (1932), a film Gunn is a big fan of, calling him "a detestable character". Gunn described the High Evolutionary as the "cruelest MCU villain" up to that point due to how he negatively impacts the lives of Rocket and his fellow subject friends, while Iwuji and Gunn ensured they avoided giving the character any intentional sympathy unlike previous MCU villains such as Thanos or Killmonger, instead opting to focus on the character's single mindedness and his narcissistic and zealous personality, which was likened to some of the "most horrific" historical figures.
- Linda Cardellini as Lylla:
  An anthropomorphic otter who is an associate and friend of Rocket. Cardellini provided both the voice and motion capture for Lylla, having previously played Laura Barton in past MCU media.
- Nathan Fillion as Master Karja: An orgosentry at Orgocorp.
- Sylvester Stallone as Stakar Ogord: A high-ranking Ravager.

Reprising their respective roles from previous Guardians films and/or The Guardians of the Galaxy Holiday Special (2022) are Elizabeth Debicki as Ayesha, the golden High Priestess and the leader of the Sovereign people who created Adam Warlock to destroy the Guardians; Michael Rosenbaum as Martinex, a high-ranking Ravager; Seth Green as the voice of Howard the Duck; Christopher Fairbank as the Broker; Stephen Blackehart and Rhett Miller as Steemie and Bzermikitokolok, two denizens of Knowhere; Gregg Henry as Quill's grandfather Jason; and Michael Rooker as Yondu Udonta, the former head of the Ravagers and Peter's deceased mentor. Maria Bakalova reprises her voice and motion capture role from the Holiday Special as Cosmo, a member of the Guardians who is a sapient dog that developed psionic abilities after being abandoned in outer space by the Soviet Union. Gunn changed Cosmo's gender from male, as depicted in the comics, to female for the film, as a tribute to the character's original inspiration, Laika, a Soviet space dog who became one of the first animals in space. Cosmo was physically portrayed by dog actor Slate, after also doing so for the Holiday Special, and was previously portrayed by dog actor Fred in the first two Guardians films. Tara Strong (who voiced Miss Minutes in the Disney+ series Loki) voices Mainframe who was previously voiced by an uncredited Miley Cyrus in Vol. 2. Jared Gore provides motion capture for Krugarr, a Ravager who wields sorcery powers and speaks through his sorcery.

Asim Chaudhry voices Teefs, an anthropomorphic walrus; Mikaela Hoover (who played Nova Prime's assistant in the first film) voices Floor, an anthropomorphic rabbit; Daniela Melchior appears as Ura, the receptionist at Orgocorp; Miriam Shor and Nico Santos appear as Recorder Vim and Recorder Theel, respectively, the scientifically minded henchmen of the High Evolutionary; Jennifer Holland appears as Administrator Kwol, a security employee of Orgocorp; Kai Zen appears as Phyla, one of the High Evolutionary's Star Child prisoners; Judy Greer (who played Maggie Lang in the first two Ant-Man films) voices War Pig, a cyborg pig and member of the Hell Spawns working for the High Evolutionary; Reinaldo Faberlle voices Behemoth, a cyborg bird and member of the Hell Spawns who also works for the High Evolutionary; Dee Bradley Baker voices Blurp, a furry F'saki that is an unnamed Ravager's pet; and Dane DiLiegro appears as an Humanimal octopus drug dealer on Counter-Earth (credited as "Unsavory Octopus").

Cameo appearances in the film include Lloyd Kaufman as Gridlemop, a Krylorian on Knowhere who partakes in a card game with Kraglin; Pete Davidson as Phlektik, a guard at Arête Laboratories; Molly C. Quinn as a Ravager; and writer and director James Gunn as the voice of Lambshank, a deformed experiment of the High Evolutionary that is among those freed by the Guardians of the Galaxy. Gunn originally wrote the role for Stan Lee and planned to have him record Lambshank's voice instead of traveling to Atlanta due to Lee's growing age, before designing the character's face to resemble Lee's. After Lee's death, Gunn chose to take over the role.

== Production ==
=== Development ===
==== Initial work ====
Guardians of the Galaxy (2014) writer and director James Gunn stated in November 2014 that, in addition to having the "basic story" for Guardians of the Galaxy Vol. 2 (2017) while working on the first film, he also had ideas for a potential third film. Despite this, he was unsure in June 2015 if he would be involved with a third Guardians film, saying that it would depend on how he felt after making Vol. 2. In April 2016, Marvel Studios president Kevin Feige, the producer of the Guardians films, said a third film was planned for the franchise as part of the Marvel Cinematic Universe (MCU) in "2020 and beyond". In March 2017, Gunn said there would be a third film "for sure. We're trying to figure it out", soon adding that there were no specific plans for the film yet, but that Marvel would want to make it "unless something goes horribly—which is always possible, you never know". He also reiterated that he had not decided whether he would be directing the film, and that he was going to figure out his involvement and his next project "over the next couple of weeks". Part of Gunn's reluctance to return to the franchise came from not wanting to work on it without Michael Rooker, whose character from the first two films, Yondu Udonta, died at the end of Vol. 2.

"In the end, my love for Rocket, Groot, Gamora, Star-Lord, Yondu, Mantis, Drax, and Nebula—and some of the other forthcoming heroes—goes deeper than you guys can possibly imagine, and I feel they have more adventures to go on and things to learn about themselves and the wonderful and sometimes terrifying universe we all inhabit."

— James Gunn, writer and director of Guardians of the Galaxy Vol. 3, on his decision to return for the film

Gunn announced in April 2017 that he would return to write and direct Guardians of the Galaxy Vol. 3. He said the film would be set after Avengers: Infinity War (2018) and Avengers: Endgame (2019), and would "conclude the story of this iteration of the Guardians of the Galaxy, and help catapult both old and new Marvel characters into the next ten years and beyond". He also felt that the three Guardians films would "work together as a whole", telling one story, with the third film "tying a lot of stuff together" from the first two and giving "a lot of answers on a lot of different things". Gunn also planned to work with Marvel on the future of the "Marvel Cosmic Universe". He was set to begin work on Vol. 3 shortly after completing his work as executive producer and consultant on Infinity War. On returning for the third film, Gunn said, "I wouldn't have said yes if I didn't have a fairly clear idea of where we were going and what we were going to do. I'm not a guy that's just going to do it if I don't have a vision for it".

After originally including Adam Warlock in his script treatment for Vol. 2, Gunn and Feige noted the importance of the character on the cosmic side of the MCU and hinted that he would make an appearance in Vol. 3. In May 2017, after the release of Vol. 2, Gunn said he would be creating the third film "over the next three years", and confirmed that Pom Klementieff would reprise her role as Mantis. He also intended to have Elizabeth Debicki reprise her role as Ayesha. By mid-June, Gunn had completed the first draft of his script treatment for the third film, and was considering changing a piece of character info he had placed in the background of the mugshot sequence in the first film (when the Guardians are captured by the Nova Corps). In September, Gunn reiterated that Vol. 3 would be released "in a little under three years", as the film had privately been set for release on May 1, 2020. At the end of February 2018, Gunn planned to meet with Mark Hamill about possibly appearing in the film. In April, Chris Pratt was set to reprise his role as Peter Quill / Star-Lord, and the following month, Dave Bautista confirmed that he would reprise his role as Drax the Destroyer. Marvel received the completed first draft of the screenplay from Gunn by the end of June, ahead of the beginning of official pre-production on the film.

==== Firing of James Gunn ====
On July 20, 2018, Disney and Marvel severed ties with Gunn. This came after conservative commentators, such as Mike Cernovich, began circulating old tweets he had made regarding controversial topics such as rape and pedophilia, and called for his firing. The Walt Disney Studios chairman Alan F. Horn stated, "The offensive attitudes and statements discovered on James' Twitter feed are indefensible and inconsistent with our studio's values, and we have severed our business relationship with him". While not part of the decision to fire Gunn, the Walt Disney Company CEO Bob Iger supported the "unanimous decision" from the various executives at Marvel and Walt Disney Studios. In response, Gunn said in a series of tweets that when he started his career he was "making movies and telling jokes that were outrageous and taboo" but felt as he has "developed as a person, so has my work and my humor". He continued, "It's not to say I'm better, but I am very, very different than I was a few years ago; today I try to root my work in love and connection and less in anger. My days saying something just because it's shocking and trying to get a reaction are over". In a separate statement, Gunn said the tweets at the time were "totally failed and unfortunate efforts to be provocative", adding "I understand and accept the business decisions taken today. Even these many years later, I take full responsibility for the way I conducted myself then".

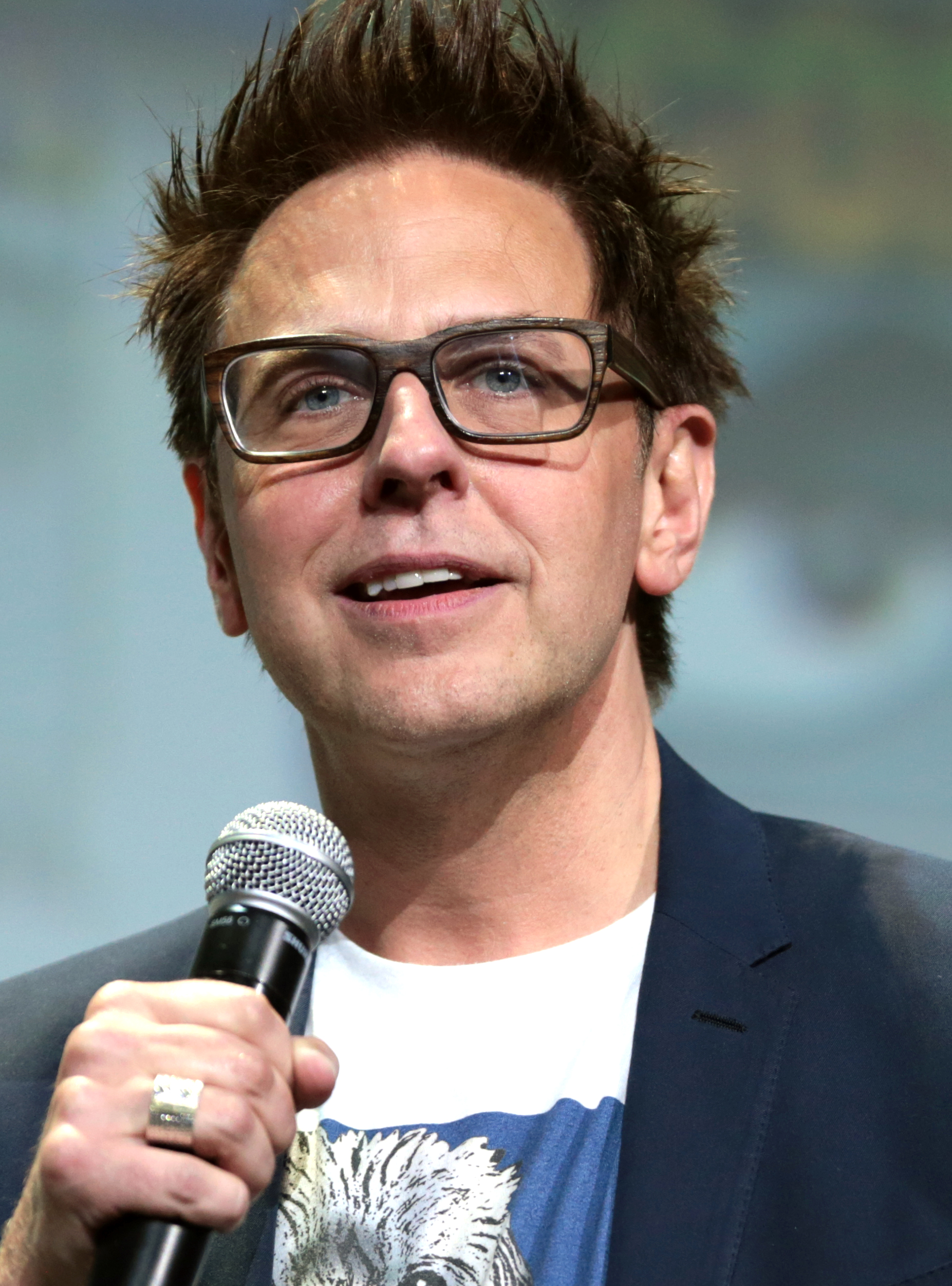
James Gunn, writer and director of Guardians of the Galaxy Vol. 3

In response to the firing, many of the Guardians cast members tweeted support for Gunn. Rooker decided to leave Twitter, while fans signed an online petition asking for Gunn to be reinstated which received over 300,000 signatures. The firing also garnered reaction from other Hollywood personalities, such as actress Selma Blair and comedian Bobcat Goldthwait, and inspired opinion pieces on the firing and how it would affect Hollywood from Kareem Abdul-Jabbar, and news organizations such as The Hollywood Reporter, Variety, Deadline Hollywood, and Forbes. On July 30, the cast of the Guardians of the Galaxy films, including Pratt, Zoe Saldaña, Bautista, Bradley Cooper, Vin Diesel, Sean Gunn, Klementieff, Rooker, and Karen Gillan, issued a statement in support of James Gunn, saying, "We fully support James Gunn. We were all shocked by his abrupt firing last week and have intentionally waited these ten days to respond in order to think, pray, listen, and discuss. In that time, we've been encouraged by the outpouring of support from fans and members of the media who wish to see James reinstated as director of Volume 3 as well as discouraged by those so easily duped into believing the many outlandish conspiracy theories surrounding him". Despite this and the notable "vociferous support" Gunn received, Variety reported that Disney was not planning to rehire him as the jokes were "unacceptable in the #MeToo era and are not in line with Disney's family-friendly image". Variety continued that, despite rumors of Gunn being replaced by established Marvel directors such as Jon Favreau, Taika Waititi, or the Russo brothers, Marvel had yet to meet with any other director, and would most likely hire someone new. In early August, Bautista said that he would fulfill his contract and appear in the film as long as Marvel chose to use Gunn's existing script.

Disney and Marvel still wanted to "move forward quickly" on the film, and were soon confirmed to be keeping Gunn's script. This, combined with the fact that Gunn did not breach his contract since the tweets were written years before he signed on to the film, had led to "complicated negotiations" between Gunn and Disney over his exit settlement. Gunn was expected to be paid $7–10 million or more, and there was some hope that the negotiations could lead to him eventually returning in some capacity, "even if [it was] to develop and direct another Marvel movie". Gunn would be free to move on to new projects following the settlement, and other major studios were interested in hiring him including Warner Bros. for their rival superhero franchise, the DC Extended Universe (DCEU). During this time, executives at Marvel Studios began "back channel conversations" with Disney in an attempt to find a compromise that could lead to Gunn returning to the film in some way. This "eleventh-hour" effort from Marvel was inspired by the statements from the film's cast. In mid-August, Gunn met with Horn following a strong push from Gunn's talent agency for him to be given a second chance. Despite this and the reported "civil and professional" nature of the meeting, Horn only took it as a courtesy and used it to reaffirm Disney's decision to fire Gunn.

Later in August, the small crew that was preparing for pre-production were dismissed as production of the film was postponed so Marvel and Disney could find a director to replace Gunn. Pre-production was to have begun by the end of 2018, with principal photography set for January or February 2019. At this time, Bautista was unsure if he would return for the film, as he did not know if he would "want to work for Disney" given how they handled the firing of Gunn. In late September, James Gunn's brother Sean, who played Kraglin Obfonteri and provided motion capture for Rocket in the previous Guardians films, reiterated that Disney still intended on making the film with James's script, but had not revealed to the cast when production may continue. Sean added that he had been preparing to reprise his roles for the third film before his brother's firing. At the end of the month, Cooper was asked if he would consider directing Vol. 3 after the success of his directorial debut A Star Is Born (2018), but said that he "could never imagine" directing a film that he did not write. By mid-October, James Gunn had completed his exit settlement with Disney and was set to write and potentially direct The Suicide Squad (2021) for Warner Bros. and DC Films.

==== Rehiring Gunn ====
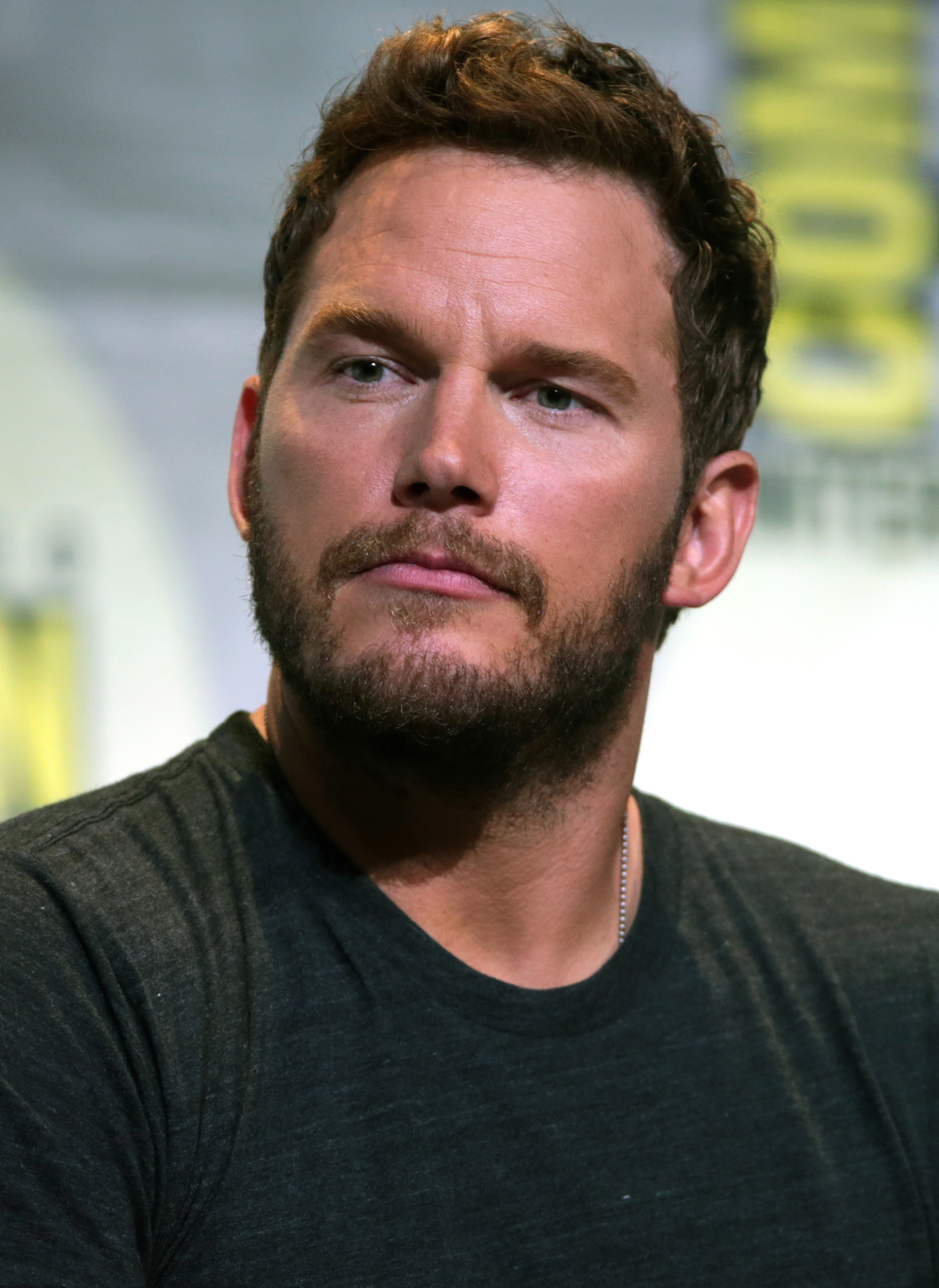
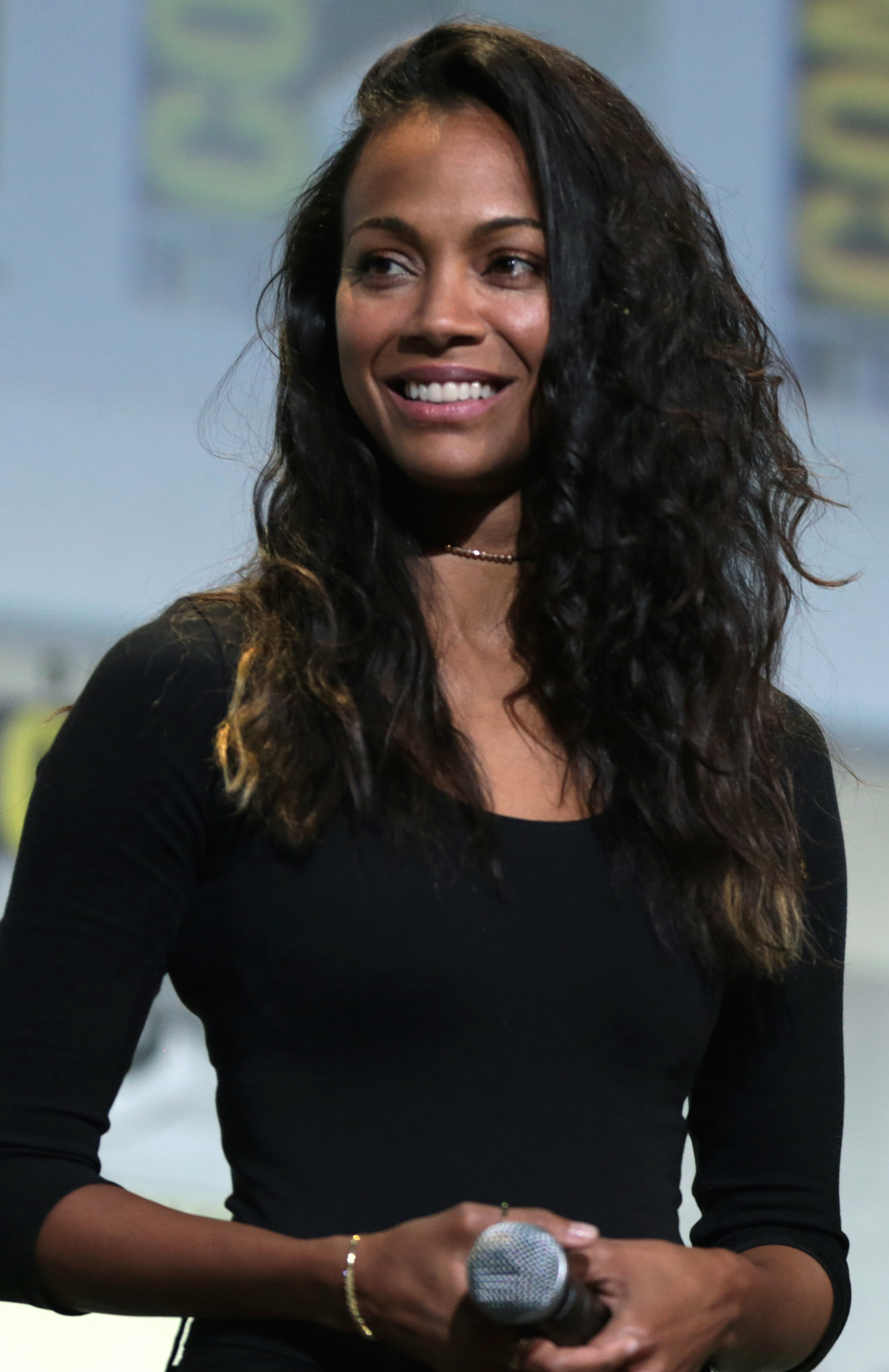
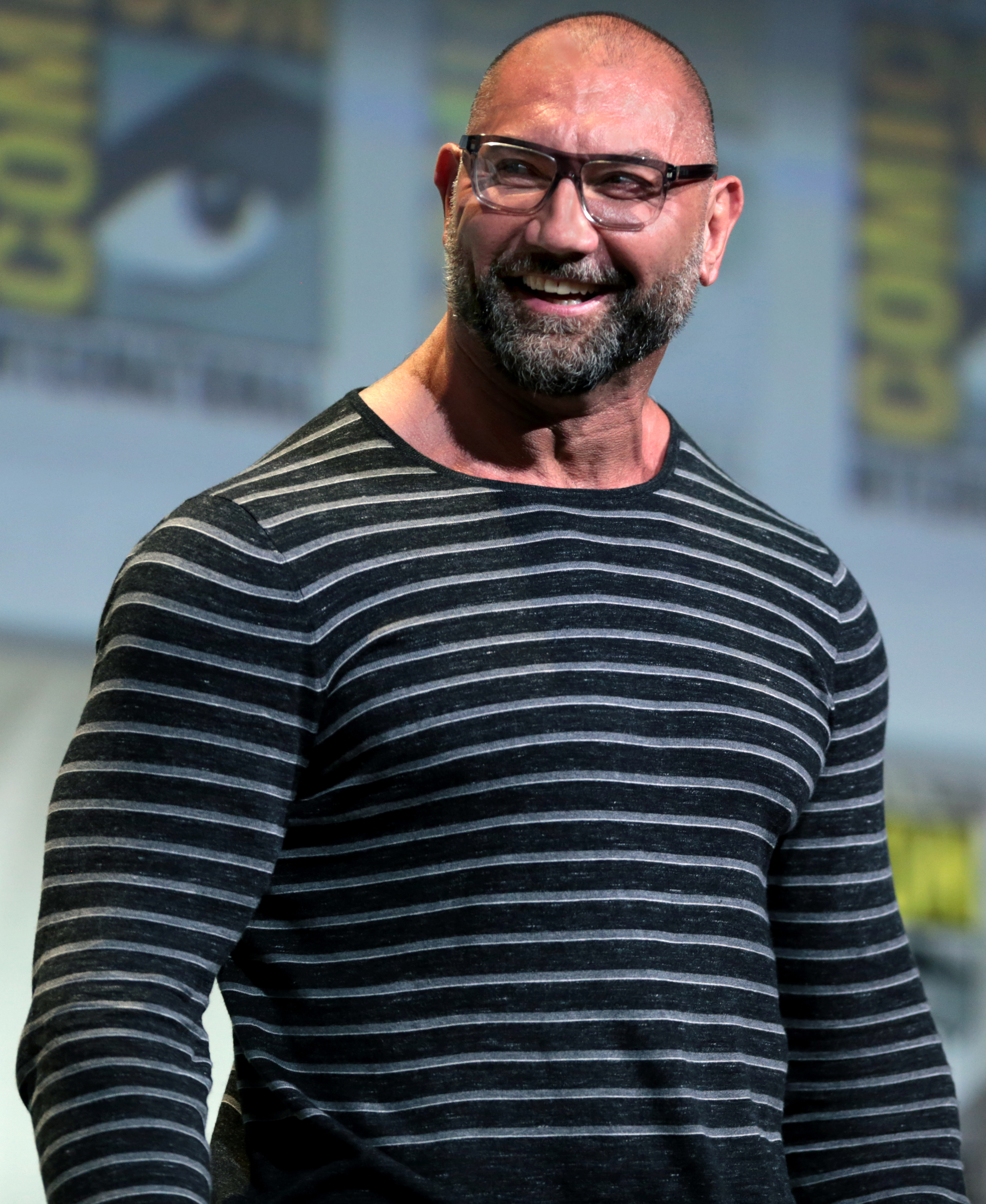
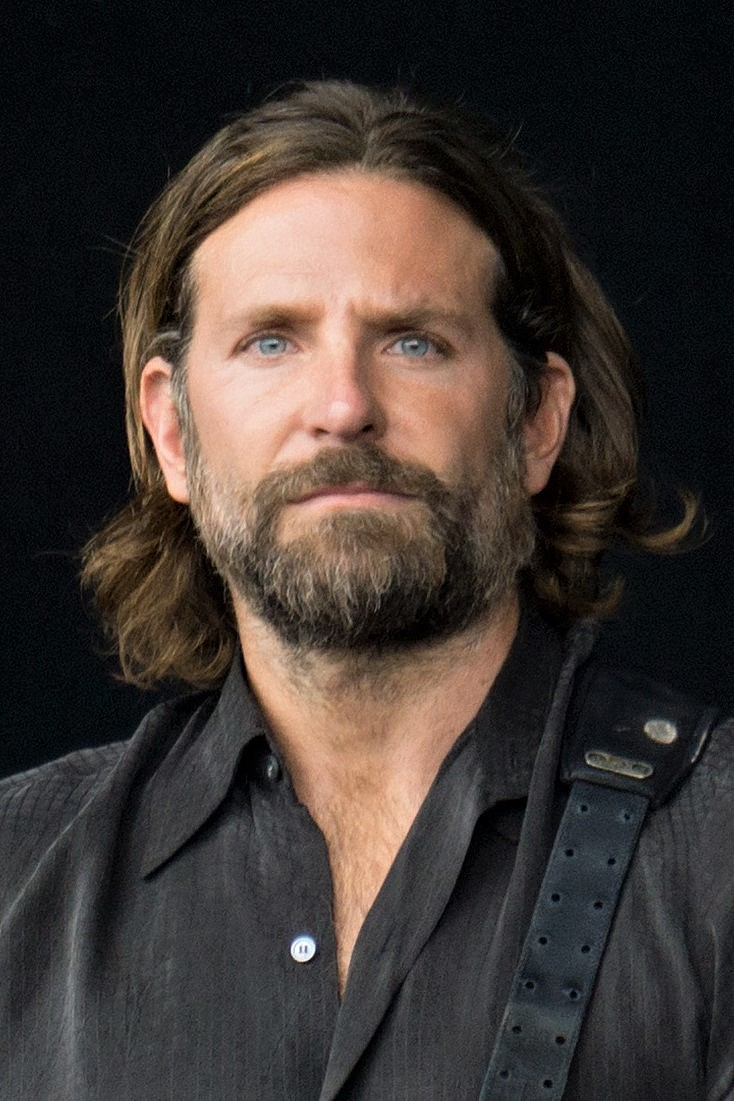
Cast members Chris Pratt, Zoe Saldaña, Bradley Cooper, and Dave Bautista were among those who voiced support for Gunn and called for his rehiring.

The day after Gunn joined The Suicide Squad in mid-October 2018, he was privately notified by Horn that he could return as director for Vol. 3. This came after further meetings between the studios and Gunn. Horn had changed his mind after being impressed by Gunn's response to the situation. Gunn discussed his commitments to The Suicide Squad with Feige, and production on Vol. 3 was put on hold until February 2021 to allow Gunn to complete The Suicide Squad first. In December, after working with Marvel Studios on the script for Ant-Man (2015), Adam McKay said he was willing to work with the studio again and stated that he had discussed taking over as director for Vol. 3 with Feige, among other projects. In early 2019, Feige and Pratt reiterated that Marvel would still make Vol. 3, and in March 2019, Gunn was publicly revealed to have been rehired as director of the film. Deadline Hollywood stated that Marvel Studios had "never met with or considered any other director" for the film. By the end of April, the franchise's five main stars—Pratt, Saldaña, Bautista, Cooper, and Diesel—were all expected to return for the sequel, with filming to take place in 2020.

Discussing his firing and re-hiring in May 2019, Gunn said that of all the elements of the film that he had been sad to leave when he was fired, the most meaningful to him was the character of Rocket. Gunn personally identifies with Rocket, describing himself and the character as "the same". He had grown to love the character since working on the first film due to feeling that an origin story for Rocket could justify what a Bugs Bunny-like "goofy character" like him could exist in the MCU if it were the saddest one in the universe, crediting it as the "seed" of the trilogy. While Vol. 3 effectively reveals Rocket's backstory through flashbacks akin to those from the story structure of The Godfather Part II (1974), Gunn initially considered telling Rocket's origins in a team-up movie between him and Groot without the other Guardians. He was eventually convinced to make a third Guardians-centric film instead of the Rocket and Groot film but chose to use it to tell Rocket's story. That month, Gillan confirmed that she was returning for the sequel and expressed excitement for Gunn's return to the franchise. In June, Saldaña was asked about her role in the film after her character Gamora was killed in Infinity War, and she returned to play a younger version in Endgame who travels through time to the present. Saldaña said that Gamora's fate would depend on the plans that Marvel and Gunn have for Vol. 3, but that she would like to see Gamora rejoin the Guardians and also be portrayed as "the most lethal woman in the galaxy" as she has been referred to previously. Gunn was asked in October if he was unhappy about Marvel's decision to kill Gamora in Infinity War and said he was not, adding that he had discussed the storyline with the studio beforehand. According to Infinity War and Endgame screenwriters Christopher Markus and Stephen McFeely, Gamora was brought back in Endgame specifically so that Gunn could include her in Vol. 3.

In December 2019, Gunn was asked if he would have Yondu return in the film and said as long as he was involved with the Guardians characters, he would not have the character be resurrected. Gunn felt the stakes of a character's death were important and said characters who die in his films would likely remain dead. Gunn said in February 2020 that bringing Yondu back to life would "nullify Yondu's sacrifice" in Vol. 2, and said the character would not return unless it was for a prequel or flashback; Gunn later said Yondu would not be resurrected in the film to not diminish his death's meaning. In April, Gunn said the COVID-19 pandemic would not affect production plans for the film at that time, saying the next month that the film would be released "a little after 2021". In August, Gunn turned in a new draft of the film's script and began writing a spin-off television series from The Suicide Squad titled Peacemaker (2022). A month later, he was planning to begin work on Vol. 3 in 2021 after completing that film and series. He confirmed in November that the script for Vol. 3 was finished, and said that very little had changed from his initial ideas despite the production setbacks. The film was given a 2023 release date a month later, with filming set to begin in late 2021. Shortly after, it was revealed to also be set after The Guardians of the Galaxy Holiday Special (2022).

=== Pre-production ===
Pre-production work creating the designs and visuals for the film began by April 2021. In early May, Marvel Studios announced that the film would be released on May 5, 2023. Later that month, Gunn said Vol. 3 would take place after the events of Thor: Love and Thunder (2022), which features several Guardians characters. That film concludes the storyline established in Endgame which sees Thor journey off with the Guardians. Gunn noted this ending was decided upon "in editing" and conflicted with his already-submitted screenplay for Vol. 3, since he never planned to feature Thor in the film, as he did not "understand the character that much" nor how to write Thor. Gunn had begun storyboarding the film by June, with filming later revealed to begin in November 2021 in Atlanta, Georgia for an expected end around April 2022. By then, Bautista said he had not read a script for Vol. 3 and was unsure if it had changed during the production delays. The next month, Gillan said that she and Klementieff had read the script together and she found it to be incredible, brilliant, emotional, and funny. She also felt it was Gunn's "strongest work yet" with the Guardians characters. Gunn reiterated that the script had "basically stayed the same" from three years prior but he had been "playing with it in little ways" over the years. He was in the middle of another draft by the end of the month and said the film would be emotional and have a "heavier" story than the previous films, with a more grounded approach that was inspired by The Suicide Squad and Peacemaker. An early option Gunn had in mind for the character who would become the film's main villain and be revealed to be the one who created Rocket was the Fantastic Four villain Annihilus, but Gunn ultimately opted to fill that role with the High Evolutionary. Gunn originally wrote a cameo appearance for Kumail Nanjiani, a friend of his, but removed this after learning Nanjiani was cast as Kingo in Marvel Studios' Eternals (2021).

By late August, Gunn and Marvel Studios began meeting with actors for the role of Adam Warlock, including Will Poulter, who auditioned for the role over Zoom before an in-person screen test with Gunn in Atlanta. Poulter initially knew the character had been teased at the end of Vol. 2, but was not told the character's name until he was "drip-fed" information about Warlock's "steeped" comic book history with the High Evolutionary. George MacKay had also been on the shortlist and Regé-Jean Page was considered for the part, while David Corenswet also auditioned and Aaron Pierre was almost cast in the role; the latter two were later cast by Gunn for the DC Universe (DCU) franchise, as Superman and John Stewart / Green Lantern respectively. Gunn found it difficult to integrate the character into the story, despite setting up the character's appearance at the end of Vol. 2, calling his inclusion "kind of fitting a weird square peg into a round hole". In September, Gillan reiterated her positive comments about the script and said the film would explore the characters from the previous Guardians films on a deeper level, while Seth Green, who voices Howard the Duck in the MCU, said the film would be about Gamora and Nebula's story. He did not know at that time if Howard would appear after doing so in the previous Guardians films. Poulter was cast as Adam Warlock in October, and Gunn said "dozens of roles" had already been cast. Poulter was chosen for the part because of his dramatic and comedic abilities and because Gunn "wanted somebody who was youthful" and would fit with Marvel Studios' future plans for the character. Casting also took place for various background roles, including aliens and security guards. Pratt began rehearsals and camera tests later that month, and a production meeting was held in early November, shortly before the start of filming. Gunn also reiterated his comments on not resurrecting Yondu in the film.

=== Filming ===
Principal photography began on November 8, 2021, at Trilith Studios in Atlanta, Georgia, under the working title Hot Christmas. Henry Braham served as cinematographer, after doing so for Vol. 2, The Suicide Squad, and The Guardians of the Galaxy Holiday Special. Filming was previously scheduled to begin in January or February 2019 prior to Gunn's firing, and then in February 2021, before Gunn began work on Peacemaker. With the start of filming, Sylvester Stallone revealed that he would return as Stakar Ogord from Vol. 2, and Gunn posted a photo of the main cast members which revealed that Chukwudi Iwuji was part of the film following his collaboration with Gunn on Peacemaker. Iwuji's screen test for the film was shot on the set of Peacemaker with that series' crew, and Marvel repaid this favor by letting Gunn use the Vol. 3 set and crew to film Ezra Miller's cameo appearance as Barry Allen / The Flash for the Peacemaker first-season finale.

Production designer Beth Mickle said Gunn chose to mainly use practical effects for Vol. 3 after they did so with their work on The Suicide Squad. In February 2021, Gunn stated the film would be shot using Industrial Light & Magic's StageCraft virtual production technology that was developed for the Disney+ Star Wars series The Mandalorian (2019–2023), but in October, he said they would not be able to use the technology because the sets were too big, believing they were larger than the sets used on The Suicide Squad. The interior of the Guardians' new ship, the Bowie, was a four-story set. Judianna Makovsky served as costume designer. The Guardians of the Galaxy Holiday Special was filmed at the same time as Vol. 3, from February to late April 2022, with the same main cast and sets. Gunn enjoyed being able to switch to filming the special after doing scenes for Vol. 3, given the tonal difference between the two with Vol. 3 being more "emotional", feeling it helped provide a "relief" to the actors as well, and called the Holiday Special shoot easier than Vol. 3. In February 2022, Callie Brand was revealed to appear in the film as an alien. Shooting was also expected to occur in London, England, in late 2021. Vol. 3 is the first MCU film to feature the word "fuck" uncensored; it is spoken by Quill. The dialogue "Open the fucking door" was not scripted, but improvised by Pratt on Gunn's suggestion, although, there was some consideration over giving the one-liner to Groot instead. Gunn was inspired by the Korean film The Villainess (2017) for the action scenes in Vol. 3. Filming on Vol. 3 wrapped on May 6, 2022.

=== Post-production ===
In early June 2022, Daniela Melchior was revealed to have a small role in the film, after previously starring in The Suicide Squad. Debicki was also confirmed to be reprising her role as Ayesha, while Maria Bakalova and Nico Santos were also revealed to be appearing in the film. In July, Iwuji and Bakalova were revealed to be portraying the High Evolutionary and Cosmo the Spacedog, respectively. Cosmo was physically portrayed by dog actor Fred in the first two Guardians films, and Slate in the Holiday Special and Vol. 3. The following month, Michael Rosenbaum revealed that he had reprised his role as Martinex from Vol. 2 in the film. In October 2022, it was revealed that Bakalova would appear as Cosmo in the Holiday Special ahead of her role in Vol. 3. In February 2023, Asim Chaudhry revealed he had a role in the film, voicing Teefs, and in April, Linda Cardellini and Tara Strong were revealed to have respectively voiced Lylla and Mainframe. Cardellini previously appeared in multiple MCU projects as Laura Barton, starred in the Gunn-written films Scooby-Doo (2002) and Scooby-Doo 2: Monsters Unleashed (2004), and had a cameo in Gunn's film Super (2010), while Strong replaced Miley Cyrus, who voiced Mainframe in Vol. 2, due to Cyrus being unavailable. Two days of reshoots occurred.

The visual effects were provided by Framestore, Wētā FX, Sony Pictures Imageworks, Industrial Light & Magic, Rodeo FX, Rise FX, Crafty Apes, BUF, Lola VFX, Perception, and Compuhire. Stephane Ceretti returned from the first film to serve as the visual effects supervisor, while Fred Raskin returned from the first two films to serve as the editor, alongside Greg D'Auria, who returned from the Holiday Special. Additional editing was provided by Tatiana S. Riegel.

== Music ==
In April 2017, Gunn felt the music for the film would be different from what was used for the first two films' soundtracks, Awesome Mix Vol. 1 and Vol. 2. The next month, he added that he was "panicking" about the soundtrack and had to make some "pretty specific choices" shortly due to the wider range of available music for the story, By early July 2017, Gunn had narrowed down his choices for potential songs to 181, but noted that this list could grow again. All of the songs for the film had been selected by the following month; the songs are not modern and come from Quill's Zune that he received at the end of Vol. 2, although Gunn added that the soundtrack was not limited to 1970s pop songs compared to the first two films, instead spanning multiple decades. Gunn was unable to use the song "Russian Roulette" by the Lords of the New Church for Vol. 3 due to a legal battle over its ownership. The film opens with an acoustic version of "Creep" by Radiohead, which provided "a much different tone from the beginning than the other two films". The film ends with "Dog Days Are Over" by Florence and the Machine, as Gunn is a fan of its album Lungs; he had thought about including the song to wrap-up the trilogy since he started writing Vol. 2.

The track list for Awesome Mix Vol. 3 was revealed in April 2023, and was made available on Spotify and Apple Music on April 3 as part of a larger Guardians of the Galaxy: The Official Mixtape playlist, which also featured the soundtracks and scores from the previous two films. Awesome Mix Vol. 3 was released by Hollywood Records on CD and digital download on May 3, 2023, a 12" 2-LP vinyl on May 5, and on cassette on July 7.

In October 2021, Gunn revealed that John Murphy was composing the film's score and had already recorded music to be played on set during filming. Murphy replaces Tyler Bates, who composed the score for the first two films. However, Bates' theme from the previous films were referenced; Murphy had also replaced Bates as composer of The Suicide Squad after Bates left that film during production. Murphy's original score for the film was released digitally on May 3, 2023.

== Marketing ==
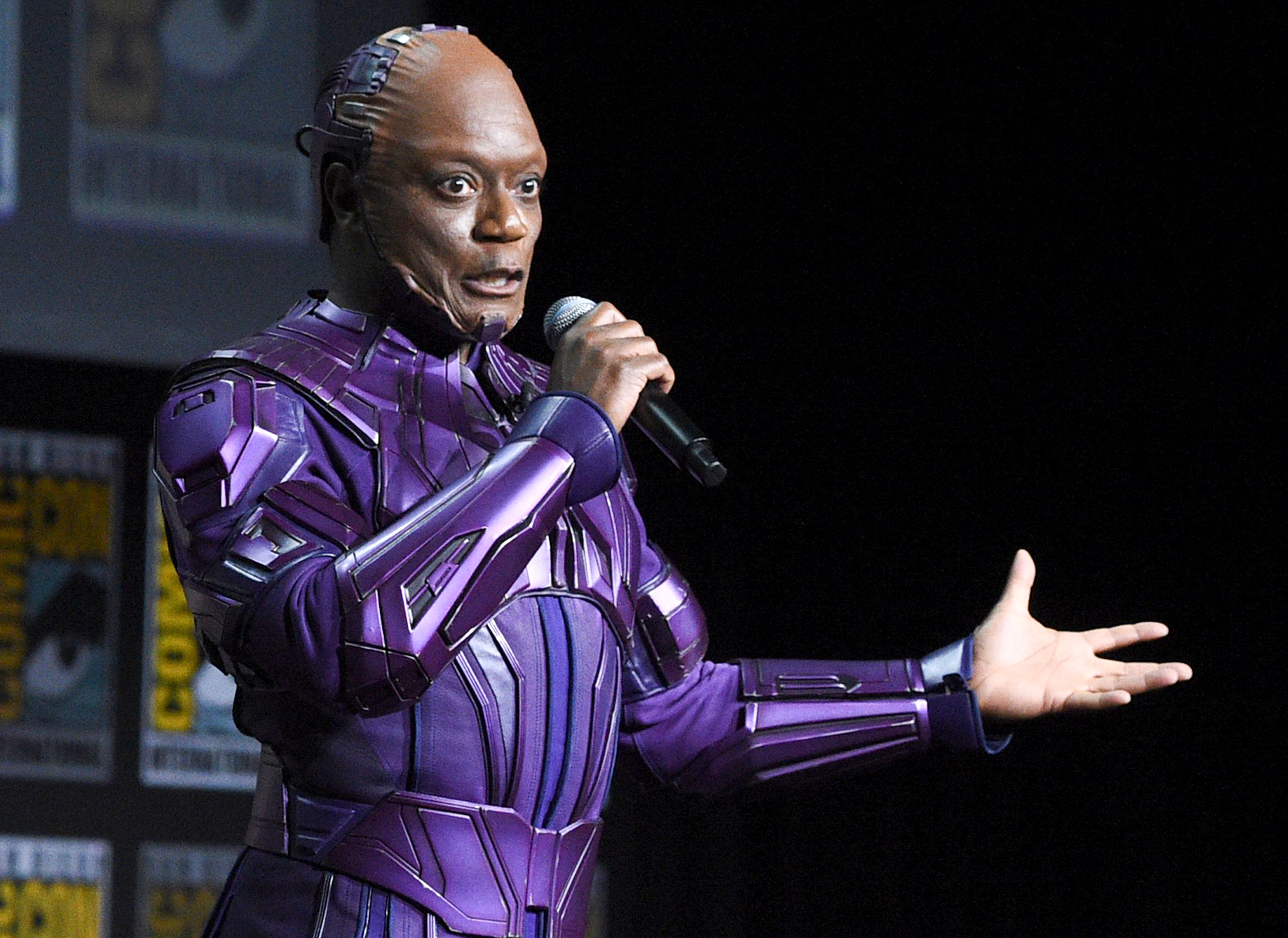
Chukwudi Iwuji promoting the film at San Diego Comic-Con in costume as the High Evolutionary

The film was discussed during Marvel Studios' panel at the 2022 San Diego Comic-Con, where the first footage was revealed. Iwuji was also announced as playing the High Evolutionary, appearing at the panel in costume. Gunn stated the footage was not released publicly because the visual effects were not complete enough for "repeated views and close inspection". An official trailer was released on December 1, 2022, during the CCXP. It featured "In the Meantime" by Spacehog. Drew Taylor of TheWrap called the trailer a doozy, thrilling, and emotional, and stated that "Gunn's patented, rollicking 'Guardians of the Galaxy' tone is very much in place", and noted "an undercurrent of extreme melancholy". Carson Burton of Variety predicted from the trailer that the film would be "shaping up to be an emotional ending" by showing Rocket's memories and Star-Lord missing Gamora. Jay Peters at The Verge said the trailer intrigued him as a "wild ride across the stars" with different planets.

A second trailer for the film was released during Super Bowl LVII on February 12, 2023. It featured "Since You Been Gone" by Rainbow. Grant Hermanns of Screen Rant felt the trailer gave "a deeper look" at the film, particularly Adam Warlock's powers as compared to his brief appearance in the first one. Hermanns also said the second trailer "goes a step further in highlighting the emotional story" after the first one "efficiently set [the film's] tone, featuring plenty of melancholic shots of the [Guardians of the Galaxy] facing the music". The trailer accumulated 134.1 million views across TikTok, Instagram, YouTube, Twitter, and Facebook, and was the most-watched Super Bowl trailer in post-game day traffic according to RelishMix. It was also the first time since the onset of the COVID-19 pandemic that a Super Bowl trailer exceeded 100 million views on social media in a 24-hour period.

Disney and Marvel Music partnered with Spotify in May 2023, to promote the film. As part of the promotion, a playlist, titled the "K-GOTG Radio Experience", was created on the platform. Marvel Studios also promoted the film with General Mills limited-edition cereals and snacks, including Honey Nut Cheerios, Cookie Crisp, Lucky Charms, Trix, Reese's Puffs, Cinnamon Toast Crunch, and Go-Gurt. Microsoft also partnered with Marvel Studios to promote the film with a limited-edition Zune MP3 player; a single non-functional model would be created using 3D printing and launched inside the International Space Station.

== Release ==
=== Theatrical ===
Guardians of the Galaxy Vol. 3 had an early screening at Dongdaemun Design Plaza on April 19, 2023. The film premiered at Disneyland Paris on April 22, 2023, and its North American premiere was held at the Dolby Theatre in Hollywood, Los Angeles, on April 27. The film was released in several countries including the United Kingdom on May 3, 2023, and in the United States on May 5. It was originally set for release on May 1, 2020, before it was dropped from that date. It is part of Phase Five of the MCU. The film was released in 3D, IMAX, Dolby Cinema, 4DX, and ScreenX. Disney released over 600 unique versions of the film to theaters, including a version with variable aspect ratios. Forty-five minutes of the film was presented in the flat 1.85:1 aspect ratio, while the rest of the film is in the 2.39:1 letterboxed aspect ratio.

=== Home media ===
Guardians of the Galaxy Vol. 3 was released by Walt Disney Studios Home Entertainment on digital download on July 7, 2023; on Ultra HD Blu-ray, Blu-ray, and DVD on August 1; and on Disney+ on August 2, where an IMAX Enhanced version was also available. The UHD and Blu-Ray features the variable 1.85/2.39 aspect ratio available on select non-IMAX presentations. The film was the final physical media release for Walt Disney Studios Home Entertainment in Australia, as they decided to discontinue selling their films on physical home media there.

== Reception ==
=== Box office ===
Guardians of the Galaxy Vol. 3 grossed $359 million in the United States and Canada, and $486.6 million in other territories, for a worldwide total of $845.6 million. Deadline Hollywood calculated the net profit of the film to be $124 million, when factoring together all expenses and revenues.

In the US and Canada, Guardians of the Galaxy Vol. 3 was projected to gross around $110 million from 4,450 theaters in its opening weekend. The film made $48.2 million on its first day, including $17.5 million from Thursday night previews. It went on to debut with $118.4 million, topping the box office. In its second weekend, Guardians of the Galaxy Vol. 3 retained the top spot at the box office with $62 million, a 48% decline from its opening weekend and the best second-weekend hold of any sequel in the Marvel Cinematic Universe, and a notably smaller second-weekend decline than those of the franchise's recent releases, including Ant-Man and the Wasp: Quantumania (70%), Thor: Love and Thunder (68%), and Doctor Strange in the Multiverse of Madness (67%). The film made $32 million in its third weekend, being dethroned by Fast X.

Outside the US and Canada, the film grossed $168.1 million in its opening weekend. In its second weekend, the film grossed $92 million for a drop of 40% from its opening weekend. As of May 27, 2023, the highest grossing territories were China ($77.4 million), the United Kingdom ($36 million), Mexico ($30.8 million), South Korea ($26.7 million), and France ($24.3 million).

=== Critical response ===
The review aggregator website Rotten Tomatoes reported an approval rating of 82% based on 404 reviews with an average rating of 7.2/10. The site's critics consensus reads: "A galactic group hug that might squeeze a little too tight on the heartstrings, the final Guardians of the Galaxy is a loving last hurrah for the MCU's most ragtag family." On Metacritic, the film has a weighted average score of 64 out of 100, based on 63 critics, indicating "generally favorable" reviews. Audiences polled by CinemaScore gave the film an average grade of "A" on an A+ to F scale, the same as the previous two Guardians films, while PostTrak reported that moviegoers gave the film a 91% positive score, with 79% saying they would definitely recommend it.

The Independent found it was "the best Marvel movie in years" as did Vox and the CBC. In mixed reviews, Peter Bradshaw of The Guardian and Nicholas Barber of the BBC agreed the film was overlong, Barber opining that "the film's saving grace is that, just as Gunn has been allowed to unleash his gonzo imagination, he has also been allowed to pour out his emotions." Wendy Ide of The Observer lauded the films for its emotional weight and deemed it a satisfying conclusion, stating that "What elevates Vol 3 (supposedly the final film in the GOTG series) is the way it keeps that personality, nodding to the irreverent swagger that is a crucial component of the Guardians USP while delivering a series of devastating emotional sucker punches along the way." Matt Singer from ScreenCrush praised the film for concluding Rocket's arc story stating that "a character tells Rocket that the events unfolding onscreen have been his story all along — and with Guardians of the Galaxy Vol. 3, it does feel like Marvel has spent $200 million on a movie about a melancholy space raccoon looking for love and acceptance."

Writing for The Verge, Charles Pulliam-Moore praised the film's action sequences and storyline and commented that "Guardians of the Galaxy Vol. 3 tells the action-packed, flashback-filled story of how Rocket Raccoon's (Bradley Cooper) life being gravely endangered gives the rest of the Guardians a reason to come together and really start working on some of the emotional issues that've been haunting them since Endgame." The Hindustan Times praised Gunn's direction and writing, commenting that "As James Gunn concludes his journey with these characters he clearly cares so deeply about, you can't help but reflect on your own. Walking out, I had my own little flashback montage playing in my head of all the adventures we've been on and foes we've faced with this lovable group of galaxy-saving idiots." Nathan Durr of CBS News praised the film's soundtrack and stated that "There's no exception here regarding the soundtrack as Gunn and company cleverly implement songs that add weight to the complexities and emotions of the characters."

A negative review from NPR criticized the approach of cruelty to animals and animal testing in the film, while The New York Times called it a "dour, visually off-putting two-and-a-half-hour A.S.P.C.A. nightmare of a film (that) may only be for completionist fans", and the Chicago Tribune, "the most empty, brutal MCU movie yet". Conversely, People for the Ethical Treatment of Animals (PETA) declared the film to be "the best animal rights film of the year", and gave Gunn a "Not a Number Award" for his depiction of animal testing.

=== Accolades ===
Accolades received by Guardians of the Galaxy Vol. 3
| Award | Date of ceremony | Category | Recipient(s) | Result | Ref. |
|---|---|---|---|---|---|
| Academy Awards | March 10, 2024 | Best Visual Effects | Stephane Ceretti, Alexis Wajsbrot, Guy Williams, and Theo Bialek | Nominated | |
| Annie Awards | February 17, 2024 | Outstanding Achievement for Character Animation in a Live Action Production | Fernando Herrera, Chris Hurtt, Nathan McConnel, Daniel Cabral, and Chris McGaw | Won | |
| Art Directors Guild Awards | February 10, 2024 | Excellence in Production Design for a Fantasy Film | Beth Mickle | Nominated | |
| Astra Film Awards | January 6, 2024 | Best Voice-Over Performance | Bradley Cooper | Nominated | |
| Astra Film Awards | January 6, 2024 | Best Action Feature | Guardians of the Galaxy Vol. 3 | Nominated | |
| Astra Film Creative Arts Awards | February 26, 2024 | Best Costume Design | Judianna Makovsky | Nominated | |
| Astra Film Creative Arts Awards | February 26, 2024 | Best Make-Up and Hair | Cassie Russek and Alexei Dmitriew | Nominated | |
| Astra Film Creative Arts Awards | February 26, 2024 | Best Visual Effects | Guardians of the Galaxy Vol. 3 | Nominated | |
| Astra Film Creative Arts Awards | February 26, 2024 | Best Stunts | Guardians of the Galaxy Vol. 3 | Nominated | |
| Austin Film Critics Association | January 10, 2024 | Best Voice Acting/Animated/Digital Performance | Bradley Cooper | Won | |
| British Academy Film Awards | February 18, 2024 | Best Special Visual Effects | Theo Bialek, Stephane Ceretti, Alexis Wajsbrot, and Guy Williams | Nominated | |
| Chinese American Film Festival | November 11, 2023 | Most Popular U.S. Film in China | Guardians of the Galaxy Vol. 3 | Won | |
| Critics' Choice Awards | January 14, 2024 | Best Visual Effects | Guardians of the Galaxy Vol. 3 | Nominated | |
| Critics' Choice Super Awards | April 4, 2024 | Best Superhero Movie | Guardians of the Galaxy Vol. 3 | Nominated | |
| Critics' Choice Super Awards | April 4, 2024 | Best Actor in a Superhero Movie | Bradley Cooper | Nominated | |
| Critics' Choice Super Awards | April 4, 2024 | Best Actress in a Superhero Movie | Zoe Saldaña | Nominated | |
| Critics' Choice Super Awards | April 4, 2024 | Best Villain in a Movie | Chukwudi Iwuji | Nominated | |
| Georgia Film Critics Association | January 5, 2024 | Oglethorpe Award for Excellence in Georgia Cinema | James Gunn | Nominated | |
| Golden Globe Awards | January 7, 2024 | Cinematic and Box Office Achievement | Guardians of the Galaxy Vol. 3 | Nominated | |
| Golden Trailer Awards | June 29, 2023 | Best Fantasy Adventure | Guardians of the Galaxy Vol. 3 "Encore" | Nominated | |
| Golden Trailer Awards | June 29, 2023 | Best Summer 2023 Blockbuster Trailer | Guardians of the Galaxy Vol. 3 "Encore" | Nominated | |
| Golden Trailer Awards | June 29, 2023 | Best Teaser | Guardians of the Galaxy Vol. 3 "Magic" | Nominated | |
| Grammy Awards | February 4, 2024 | Best Compilation Soundtrack for Visual Media | Guardians of the Galaxy Vol. 3: Awesome Mix Vol. 3 | Nominated | |
| Guild of Music Supervisors Awards | March 5, 2023 | Best Music Supervision in a Trailer – Film | Cynthia Blondelle and Heather Kreamer | Nominated | |
| Hollywood Critics Association Midseason Film Awards | June 30, 2023 | Best Picture | Guardians of the Galaxy Vol. 3 | Nominated | |
| Hollywood Music in Media Awards | November 15, 2023 | Best Soundtrack Album | Guardians of the Galaxy Vol. 3: Awesome Mix Vol. 3 | Nominated | |
| Hollywood Professional Association | November 9, 2023 | Outstanding Visual Effects – Live-Action Feature | Guy Williams, Daniel Macarin, Mike Cozens, Mark Smith, and Marvyn Young (Wētā FX) | Nominated | |
| Houston Film Critics Society | November 22, 2024 | Best Visual Effects | Guardians of the Galaxy Vol. 3 | Nominated | |
| Houston Film Critics Society | November 22, 2024 | Best Stunts | Guardians of the Galaxy Vol. 3 | Nominated | |
| Make-Up Artists and Hair Stylists Guild | February 18, 2024 | Best Contemporary Make-Up | Jane Galli, Personal | Nominated | |
| Make-Up Artists and Hair Stylists Guild | February 18, 2024 | Best Period and/or Character Make-Up | Alexei Dmitriew, Nicole Sortillon, Amos Samantha Ward, and LuAndra Whitehurs | Nominated | |
| Make-Up Artists and Hair Stylists Guild | February 18, 2024 | Best Period Hair Styling and/or Character Hair Styling | Cassandra Lyn Russek, Stephanie Fenner, Peter Tothpal, and Connie Criswell | Nominated | |
| Make-Up Artists and Hair Stylists Guild | February 18, 2024 | Best Special Make-Up Effects | Alexei Dmitriew, Lindsay MacGowen, Shane Mahan, and Scott Stoddard | Nominated | |
| Make-Up Artists and Hair Stylists Guild | February 18, 2024 | Commercials and Music Videos: Best Hairstyling | Ashleigh Childers for "From the Cubicle to the Cosmos" (collaborated with HelloFresh) | Nominated | |
| MTV Millennial Awards | August 6, 2023 | Killer Series / Movie | Guardians of the Galaxy Vol. 3 | Nominated | |
| Nickelodeon Kids' Choice Awards | July 13, 2024 | Favorite Movie | Guardians of the Galaxy Vol. 3 | Nominated | |
| Nickelodeon Kids' Choice Awards | July 13, 2024 | Favorite Movie Actor | Chris Pratt | Nominated | |
| Nickelodeon Kids' Choice Awards | July 13, 2024 | Favorite Movie Actress | Zoe Saldaña | Nominated | |
| People's Choice Awards | February 18, 2024 | The Movie of the Year | Guardians of the Galaxy Vol. 3 | Nominated | |
| People's Choice Awards | February 18, 2024 | The Action Movie of the Year | Guardians of the Galaxy Vol. 3 | Nominated | |
| People's Choice Awards | February 18, 2024 | The Male Movie Star of the Year | Chris Pratt | Nominated | |
| People's Choice Awards | February 18, 2024 | The Action Movie Star of the Year | Chris Pratt | Nominated | |
| Santa Barbara International Film Festival | February 10, 2024 | Variety Artisans Award | Stephane Ceretti – VFX | Won | |
| Saturn Awards | February 4, 2024 | Best Superhero Film | Guardians of the Galaxy Vol. 3 | Won | |
| Saturn Awards | February 4, 2024 | Best Actor | Chris Pratt | Nominated | |
| Saturn Awards | February 4, 2024 | Best Director | James Gunn | Nominated | |
| Saturn Awards | February 4, 2024 | Best Producer Designer | Beth Mickle | Nominated | |
| Saturn Awards | February 4, 2024 | Best Costume | Judianna Makovsky | Nominated | |
| Saturn Awards | February 4, 2024 | Best Make-Up | Alexei Dmitriew, Lindsay MacGowan, and Shane Mahan | Nominated | |
| Saturn Awards | February 4, 2024 | Best Special Effects | Stephane Ceretti, Alexis Wajsbrot, Guy Williams, and Dan Sudick | Nominated | |
| Screen Actors Guild Awards | February 24, 2024 | Outstanding Performance by a Stunt Ensemble in a Motion Picture | Guardians of the Galaxy Vol. 3 | Nominated | |
| Seattle Film Critics Society | January 8, 2024 | Best Visual Effects | Guardians of the Galaxy Vol. 3 | Nominated | |
| Set Decorators Society of America Awards | February 13, 2024 | Best Achievement in Décor/Design of a Fantasy or Science Fiction Film | Rosemary Brandenburg and Beth Mickle | Nominated | |
| St. Louis Film Critics Association | December 17, 2023 | Best Visual Effects | Guardians of the Galaxy Vol. 3 | Nominated | |
| Visual Effects Society Awards | February 21, 2024 | Outstanding Visual Effects in a Photoreal Feature | Stephane Ceretti, Susan Pickett, Alexis Wajsbrot, Guy Williams, and Dan Sudick | Nominated | |
| Visual Effects Society Awards | February 21, 2024 | Outstanding Animated Character in a Photoreal Feature | Nathan McConnel, Andrea De Martis, Antony Magdalinidis, and Rachel Williams (for Rocket) | Won | |
| Visual Effects Society Awards | February 21, 2024 | Outstanding Created Environment in a Photoreal Feature | Omar Alejandro, Lavrador Ibanez, Fabien Julvecourt, Klaudio Ladavac, and Benjamin Patterson (for Knowhere) | Nominated | |
| Visual Effects Society Awards | February 21, 2024 | Outstanding Compositing and Lighting in a Feature | Indah Maretha, Beck Veitch, Nathan Abbot, and Steve McGillen | Nominated | |
| Visual Effects Society Awards | February 21, 2024 | Outstanding Virtual Cinematography in a CG Project | Joanna Davison, Cheyana Wilkinson, Michael Cozens, and Jason Desjarlais | Won | |
| Visual Effects Society Awards | February 21, 2024 | Outstanding Model in a Photoreal or Animated Project | Kenneth Johansson, Jason Galeon, Tim Civil, and Artur Vill (for the Arête) | Nominated | |

== Documentary special ==
In February 2021, the documentary series Marvel Studios: Assembled was announced. The special on this film, "The Making of Guardians of the Galaxy Vol. 3", was released on Disney+ on September 13, 2023.

== Future ==
James Gunn said in April 2017 that a fourth Guardians film could happen but it would likely center on a new group of characters since he planned to conclude the story of the current team in Vol. 3. Later in September, Gunn said he was unlikely to return for another Guardians film but would continue to work with Marvel Studios on other projects that use the Guardians and cosmic characters. One such potential project from Gunn was a film centered on Drax and Mantis. Bautista praised the idea for the project, but had not heard any updates on it by May 2021 and believed Marvel Studios was not interested in the idea or it did not fit into their plans for the MCU. Gunn confirmed in September 2019 that he intended for Vol. 3 to be his last Guardians film, and reaffirmed this in May 2021. In July, Gillan expressed her desire to continue playing Nebula after Vol. 3. In April 2023, Saldaña confirmed that Vol. 3 would be the last time she portrays Gamora, but hoped Marvel would recast the role with a younger actor because she wished for the character to continue.

Pratt indicated in May 2023 that he was willing to continue playing Peter Quill if the right script came along, and a note at the end of Vol. 3's post-credits scene states that the "Legendary Star-Lord" will return to the MCU. In December 2024, Gunn said he had given his blessing to Pratt to continue in the role without him, and he was excited for Marvel to use the Guardians again in future projects. He noted that there were planned spin-offs that did not eventuate but still could without his involvement, including a television series focused on the Ravagers and a project that he called "Legendary Star-Lord" which they "had a whole idea for". In January 2026, Pratt said he had an idea for how Quill's story could continue which he shared with Feige, and he was open to contributing to the next 10 years of the MCU however Marvel Studios needed him to. While he hoped that Gunn could direct the next film featuring Quill, Pratt knew that was unlikely since Gunn became the co-chairman and co-CEO of DC Studios. He was open to working with another director who would be good for the project. In September 2026, Sean Gunn said Marvel Studios had not contacted him about returning as Rocket, but said he had retired from providing the on-set motion capture for the role due to his increased age and the effects it had on his physiology.
