= Red Balloon (2010 film) =

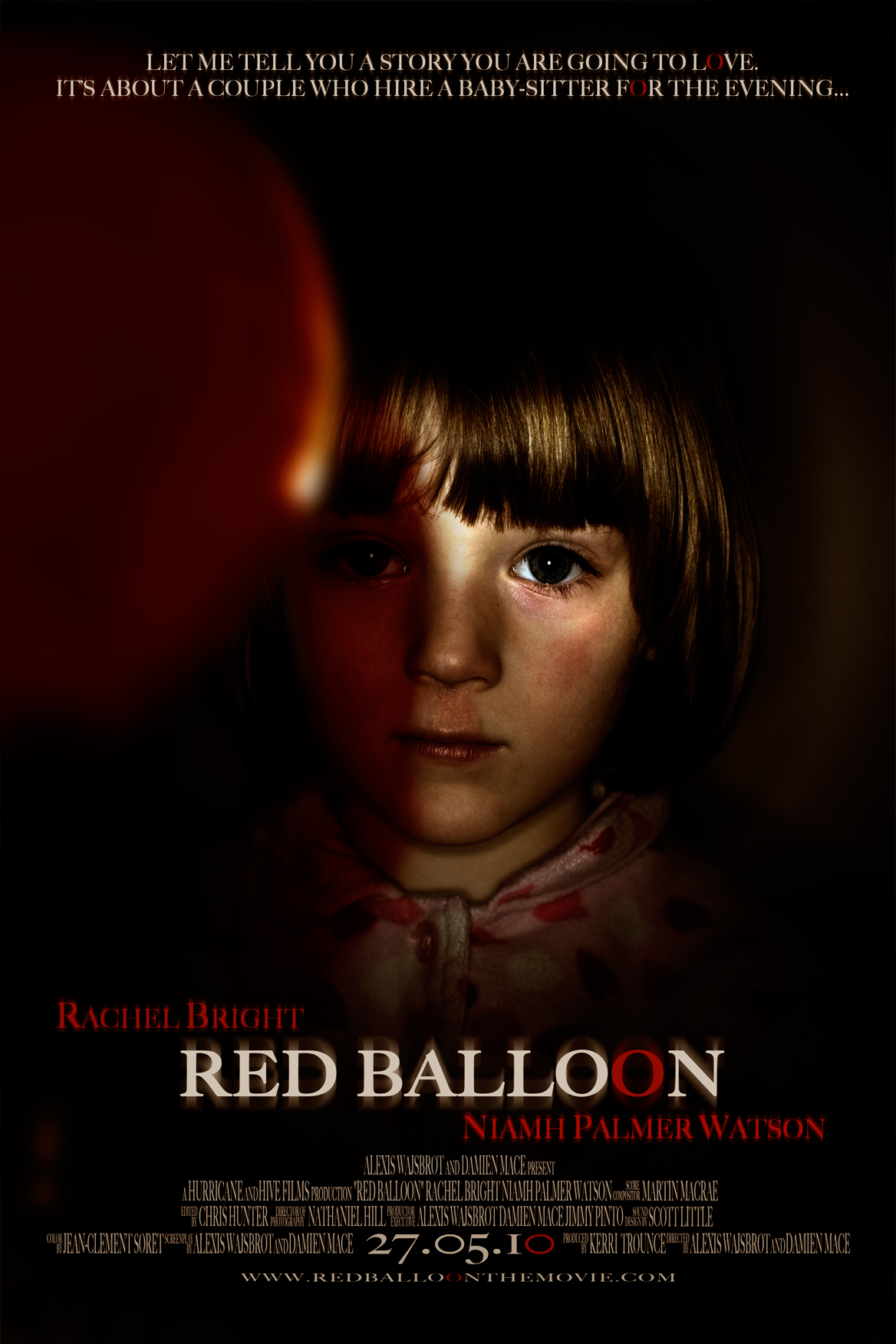
- Official poster of Red Balloon film.
- Directed by: Alexis Wajsbrot; Damien Mace
- Written by: Alexis Wajsbrot; Damien Mace; Jimmy Pinto
- Produced by: Kerri Trounce; Alexis Wajsbrot; Damien Mace
- Starring: Rachel Bright
- Cinematography: Nathaniel Hill
- Edited by: Chris Hunter
- Music by: Martin Macrae
- Distributed by: Hurricane Production
- Release date: May 2010
- Running time: 13 minutes
- Countries: France; United Kingdom
- Language: English
- Budget: £5,000

Red Balloon is a 13-minute thriller short film directed by Alexis Wajsbrot and Damien Mace. It is adapted from the "clown statue" urban legend.

The movie was nominated to numerous festivals (including Festival international de Clermont-Ferrand, Palm Springs International ShortFest, Festival International Du Film Fantastique de Gerardmer, Festival De Cannes Short Film Corner. It recently won the Directorial Discovery Award at Rhodes Island Horror film Festival, and was sold to the TV channels Arte TV and Egoist TV.

Red Balloon was released online on Vimeo and Dailymotion on 22 July 2011. It reached more than 100,000 views in a week. Red Balloon has now been seen more than 2 million times with over 1.5 million on this YouTube release.

The directors, Alexis Wajsbrot and Damien Mace are working in post-production visual effects and Red Balloon is their directorial debut. Red Balloon was shot with RedCam 4K, it includes challenging CG shots present in the trailer, with a team of 30 professionals including Jean Clement Soret for the grading (Danny Boyle's colorist).

== Plot ==
A young teenage girl named Julie is babysitting a younger child named Dorothy whilst the parents are out by themselves. Dorothy interrupts Julie's phone conversation with her friend, telling her she needs more money and so is babysitting. After hearing the child yell, she comes up to her bedroom and reassures her she has just had a nightmare. In the child's room, a pile of dolls and teddy bears are clearly noticed, including a large patchwork rabbit. Throughout the night, the teenager flicks through random TV channels and paints her nails, obviously bored with her job. A news report is informing viewers of a criminal breaking out of a mental institute, but she ignores the show and nearly falls asleep. She wakes to apparently see a red balloon and too Dorothy next to the sofa, looking terrifying, but realises she has just woken up. Another scream is heard from Dorothy's room, who is now standing up in her bed, pointing at the rabbit from the pile of toys. Julie impatiently tucks her back into bed and tells her she has nothing to be scared of, it is just a doll. Once in the landing, she phones a woman, supposedly Dorothy's mother, to ask whether the girl has had any trouble sleeping before and to question her on why she is so anxious of her toy rabbit. The mother has no idea what she is talking about because Dorothy has never had a large toy rabbit of which Julie has just described. A horrified Julie gasps and struggles to speak, her eyes flickering upstairs as the rabbit in the bedroom shuffles the other smaller toys off. The eyes snap open and it is shown that the "toy" is in fact a human intruder.

Julie runs down the stairs and out of the house into the pouring rain, sobbing hysterically. She calls the police and is even more distraught when Dorothy seems to be smothered by a figure from the bedroom window. Julie tiptoes back into the house, a powercut turning everything pitch black. She tries to conceal her heavy breathing until she is more calm. Glancing into the landing, she sees a red balloon floating in the air. Dorothy is sitting on the floor and with her hands over her eyes, appearing to be playing an innocent 'hide and seek' game. She is unfazed by the situation and clearly is unaware to Julie's panic. Julie gently kneels in front of her and quietly whispers that mummy and daddy are outside. In the background, a looming figure saunters towards the two. Dorothy points and says "Alister", going back to the news report, stating that Alister Radford was the dangerous inmate who had broken out of the institution. We also see the family home's gate, spelling out "Radford" on the sign attached to it. Speechless, Julie realises that the child knows the intruder (he is possibly her father or brother) that he is also right behind her. He attacks and she screams for a while, obviously fighting him off but he is much stronger and powerful. From the eyes of Julie laying on the floor, the intruder takes the hand of a naive Dorothy and leads her away. It is assumed that Julie has been violently killed.

== Festivals selections and awards ==
- Festival de Cannes Short Film Corner
- London Film4 Frightfest
- Sainte Maxime international horror film festival
- Fantastique Semaine du Cinema
- Directorial Discovery Award at Rhodes Island Horror film Festival
- Iinterfilm Berlin Short Film Festival
- Vimeo Film Festival narrative shortlist
- Festival du Film Court de Villeurbanne
- Festival Tous Courts d'Aix En Provence
- Festival international de Clermont-Ferrand
- Dark Mills festival
- Best Film Award at "Films in the city event" in London
- San Francisco Independent Film Festival
- Festival International Du Film D'Aubagne
- Festival International Du Film Fantastique de Gerardmer
- Festival du court métrage à MontLucon (rencontre Cine en Herbe)
- A Night of Horror International Film Festival, Sydney, Australia
- Brussels Short Film Festival
- Mecal Festival International De Cortometrajes De Barcelona
- Festival l'Europe en court-metrages
- Filmets Badalona Film Festival
- Festival Séquence court-métrage
- Palm Springs International ShortFest
- Interplay Film Festival in Canada
- International Izmir Short Film Festival
- Spasm Film Festival
- The 36th Cleveland International Film Festival
