= Red Ball Garage =

- U.S. National Register of Historic Places
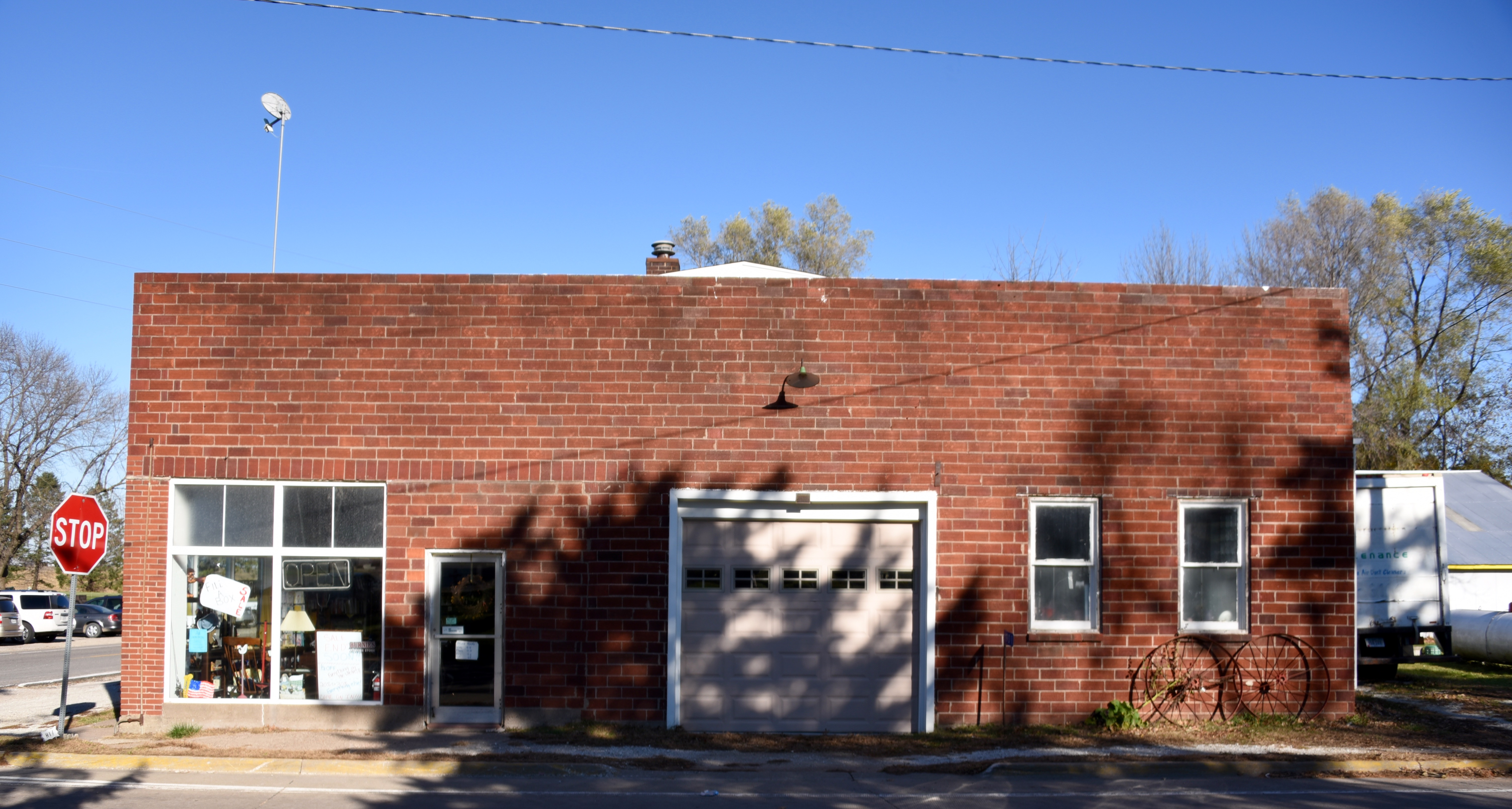

- Location within Iowa Location within the United States
- Location: 1901 140th St. Swedesburg, Iowa
- Coordinates: 41°06′19.3″N 91°32′40.2″W
- Area: less than one acre
- Built: 1929
- Architectural style: Late 19th and Early 20th Century American Movements
- MPS: Henry County, Iowa MPS
- NRHP reference No.: 99000826
- Added to NRHP: July 15, 1999

The Red Ball Garage, also known as the Ed Neil Garage, is a historic building located in Swedesburg, Iowa, United States. The building is located along what was known as the Military Road. Because of the marshy land in the area, wagons and buggies had to be pulled out of the mud. In 1913 the road became a part of the Red Ball Route, a highway that linked the Minneapolis/St. Paul area with St. Louis. It received its name from the highway signs used to mark the route. The highway was paved from 1929 to 1930, and later became U.S. Route 218 until it was moved to the east as a four lane-highway in the 1990s.

This property has been the location of vehicle-oriented businesses since 1870 when a blacksmith shop opened there. It was followed by a blacksmith and wagon-making business. As automobiles started to replace wagons the blacksmith shop was replaced by a garage. This single-story, brick building was built in 1929, replacing the original wood garage. It was remodeled in 1944 to include a Studebaker dealership. The dealership was closed in 1966 when Ed Neil bought the business. It continued to house a garage and small motor repair shop until 1998. The Swedish Heritage Museum acquired the building that year, and it was listed on the National Register of Historic Places in 1999.
