= Swedish Evangelical Lutheran Church (Swedesburg, Iowa) =

- U.S. National Register of Historic Places
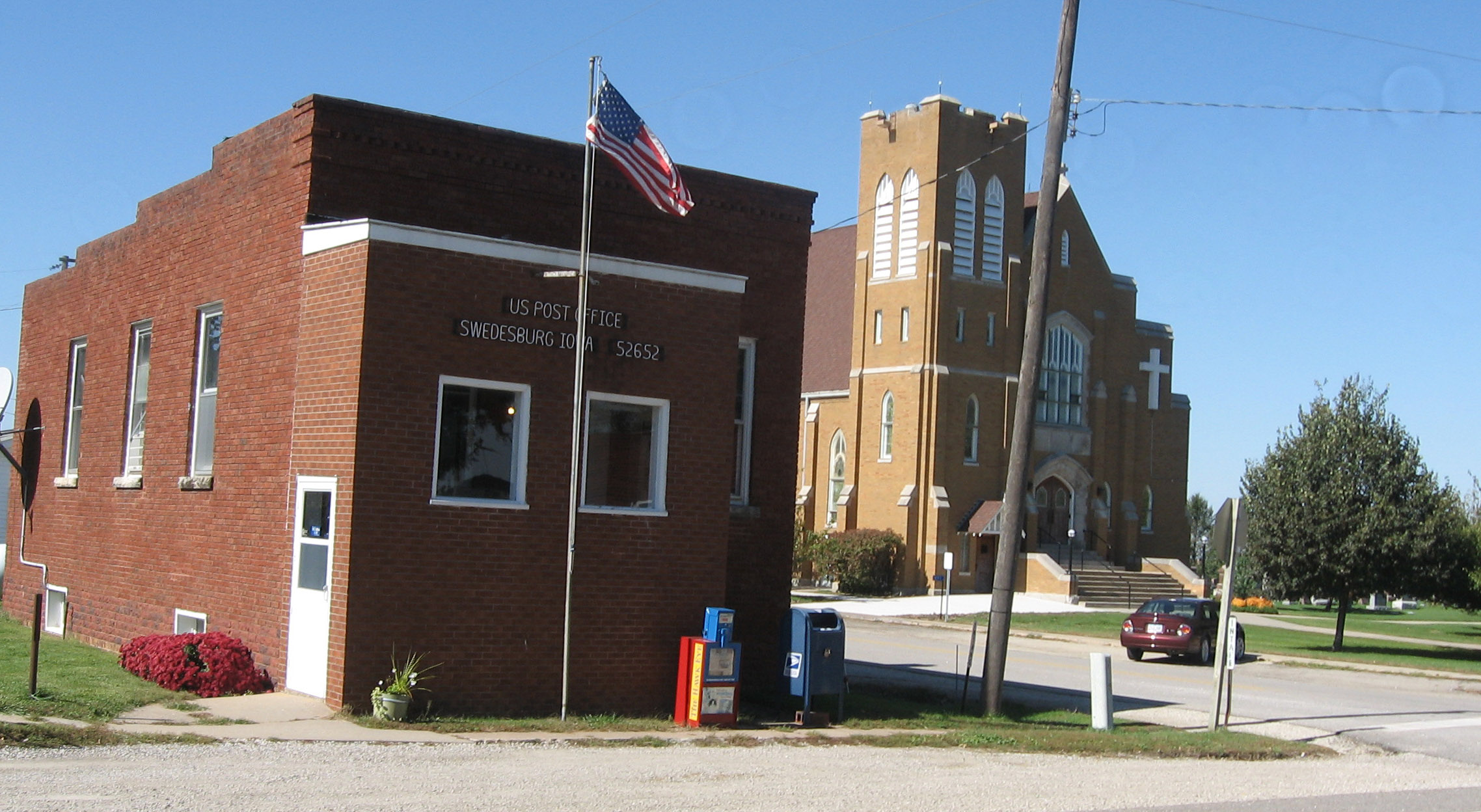
- The Swedesburg post office (left) and the church (right)

- Location within Iowa Location within the United States
- Location: 1897 140th St. Swedesburg, Iowa
- Coordinates: 41°6′19″N 91°32′43″W
- Area: less than one acre
- Built: 1928
- Architect: W.F. Weibley
- Architectural style: Late Gothic Revival
- MPS: Henry County, Iowa MPS
- NRHP reference No.: 99000827
- Added to NRHP: July 15, 1999

Swedish Evangelical Lutheran Church, now known as Swedesburg Evangelical Lutheran Church, is a historic church located in Swedesburg, Iowa, United States. The congregation was officially organized in 1866 by the Swedish Lutheran congregation from New Sweden in Jefferson County, Iowa. The present church was built in 1928 as the third church to stand on the same site. The first frame church, built in 1868, was destroyed in a fire in 1883. The second frame church, with a 110-foot (34 m) tower, was completed the same year. In 1927 it too was also destroyed by fire. The congregation hired Burlington, Iowa architect W.F. Weibley to design the present Late Gothic Revival church building. It is composed of tan brick with Bedford stone trim. The church was added to the National Register of Historic Places in 1999.

The congregation began to use English instead of Swedish in their programming beginning with the children's Sunday School classes in 1910. The men's Sunday School class was the last group to switch to English in the 1920s. The Rev. Delmar Karstens, who was called in 1966, was the first pastor who was not of Swedish descent. The congregation, however, continued to observe its Swedish traditions.
