= Guy Williams (visual effects artist) =

American visual effects artist

- Education: Mississippi State University
- Occupation: Visual effects artist

Guy Williams is an American visual effects artist. He was nominated for four Academy Awards in the category Best Visual Effects for the films The Avengers, Iron Man 3, Guardians of the Galaxy Vol. 2 and Guardians of the Galaxy Vol. 3.
