= Jason Friedberg and Aaron Seltzer =

American and Canadian screenwriter and filmmaker duo

- Born: Jason Friedberg; October 13, 1971 (age 55); Newark, New Jersey, U.S. Aaron Seltzer; January 12, 1974 (age 52); Mississauga, Ontario, Canada
- Education: University of California, Santa Barbara
- Occupations: Directors; screenwriters
- Years active: 1994–present (Note: Their last credited work was in 2015, with their works announced as late as 2017, and there have been no updates or listings for any of their other projects, nor any announcements of retirement.)
- Parent: Rick Friedberg (Jason's father)

Jason Friedberg (born October 13, 1971) and Aaron Seltzer (born January 12, 1974) are American-Canadian (respectively) filmmakers. They have primarily worked on parody films, which they began directing during the mid-2000s.

Friedberg and Seltzer met while both attending the University of California, Santa Barbara, and began their filmmaking careers as screenwriters for the films Spy Hard (1996) and Scary Movie (2000) before progressing to directing their own projects. Their first five directorial efforts between 2006 and 2010 received wide theatrical releases to mostly commercial success, but were universally panned; their films Date Movie (2006), Epic Movie (2007), Meet the Spartans and Disaster Movie (both 2008) are considered among the worst ever made. Following Vampires Suck (2010), their subsequent releases in the 2010s garnered less attention, largely due to their limited theatrical distribution.

== Early lives and education ==
Interviews with the duo are rare, but in an exclusive 2014 interview with the publication Grantland, their background was discussed: Seltzer is part of a Canadian shoe salesmen family from Mississauga, Ontario, and Friedberg, who was born in Newark, New Jersey, was raised in Paterson, New Jersey and is the son of director Rick Friedberg. Seltzer and Friedberg met at the University of California, Santa Barbara and bonded over their love of film, especially comedy. Both are Jewish. They did not attend film school, with Seltzer majoring in art history and Friedberg in history, but decided to try a career in the film industry after attending a class about Martin Scorsese in their last semester.

== Career ==
=== Spy Hard, Scary Movie and screenwriting ===
While writing screenplays at night, both spent the day attending jobs to pay their tuition, selling homemade T-shirts, starting their own food delivery service, and opening shoe shops in Los Angeles. When Rick Friedberg made the comic instruction video Bad Golf Made Easier with Leslie Nielsen, he showed his son's script for a spy film spoof to him. Nielsen approved, and this led to 1996's Spy Hard.

Friedberg and Seltzer then spent some years as screenwriters for hire, with Seltzer estimating the duo sold "upward of 40 scripts". The only finished project was an uncredited rewrite to the Jean-Claude Van Damme film Maximum Risk (1996), while an unproduced Liberace biopic (unrelated to Steven Soderbergh's TV movie Behind the Candelabra) introduced them to future collaborator and producer Peter Safran. In 1998, Safran managed to sell to Miramax's Dimension Films division a horror film spoof spec script of Friedberg and Seltzer's named Scream If You Know What I Did Last Halloween. Shawn Wayans and Marlon Wayans, with Buddy Johnson and Phil Beauman, developed a similar project and, thanks to a WGA decision, all six writers were credited on what became Scary Movie, despite Friedberg and Seltzer not actually working on the final script. The film was a sleeper hit in 2000, bringing much attention to Friedberg and Seltzer.

=== Directing ===
Tired of unmade projects as screenwriters, and with Regency Enterprises unable to find a director for their romantic comedy spoof, Seltzer and Friedberg opted to direct Date Movie (2006) themselves. Date Movie opened with $12.1 million and earned $48.9 million overall. Moving forward, they would direct their own scripts, leading to a long tract of parody films, spoofing major blockbusters. Disaster Movie opened with $5.8 million and earned $14.2 million total in the United States. Vampires Suck, which opened on a Wednesday, earned an estimated $19.7 million in its first five days.

=== Announced projects ===
In May 2014, Friedberg and Seltzer announced their intention to release Who the F#@K Took My Daughter?, a parody of Taken. In February 2017, they were reportedly developing a parody of Star Wars titled Star Worlds Episode XXXIVE=MC2: The Force Awakens the Last Jedi Who Went Rogue, whose filming was scheduled for late 2017.

== Recurring cast members ==
Crista Flanagan and Nick Steele have been the duo's most frequent collaborators, appearing in five of their films, followed by Carmen Electra (4 films) and Tony Cox, Ike Barinholtz, and Diedrich Bader (3 films each).

Actor	Date Movie	Epic Movie	Meet the Spartans	Disaster Movie	Vampires Suck	The Starving Games	Best Night Ever	Superfast!
Nick Steele	X mark	X mark	X mark	X mark			X mark	
Carmen Electra	X mark	X mark	X mark	X mark				
Tony Cox	X mark	X mark		X mark				
Adam Campbell	X mark	X mark						
Jennifer Coolidge	X mark	X mark						
Fred Willard	X mark	X mark						
Crista Flanagan		X mark	X mark	X mark	X mark		X mark	
Jareb Dauplaise		X mark	X mark					
Jim Piddock		X mark	X mark					
Tad Hilgenbrink		X mark		X mark				
Ike Barinholtz			X mark	X mark	X mark			
Diedrich Bader			X mark		X mark	X mark		
John Di Domenico			X mark	X mark				
Nicole Parker			X mark	X mark				
Matt Lanter				X mark	X mark			
Amin Joseph							X mark	X mark
Nick Gomez					X mark	X mark		

== Criticism ==
The critical reception of Friedberg and Seltzer's directorial efforts has been overwhelmingly negative. Common criticisms of their work include being heavily reliant on pop culture references, passing trends, product placement, toilet humor, gratuitous nudity, casual violence and offensive stereotypes for their humor, as well as mistaking plagiarism for parody. Disaster Movie and Meet the Spartans were rated the two worst films of 2008 by The Times. Additionally, every film they have directed has made it into Rotten Tomatoes' "Worst of the Worst" for the 2000s, only one scoring a spot outside of the bottom 25. The pair appears more often than any other person on the fan-voted list of "The 50 Worst Movies Ever" in noted British film magazine Empire; almost all of their films appear with a rank, and all are mentioned in the full review text. Flavorwire collectively lists the duo's entire filmography at #9 in its list of the 50 worst films of all time, saying:

You may as well lump them all together, because they all bleed together in cinematic hell: the "parody" efforts of Jason Friedberg and Aaron Seltzer, which include Date Movie, Epic Movie, Disaster Movie, Meet the Spartans, Vampires Suck. They're sad, limp affairs that have all but single-handedly reduced the "spoof movie" from parody to mere quotation: From Napoleon Dynamite to Borat to the "Leave Britney alone!" guy, no payoff delights these comic geniuses more than cutting away to the flavor of the month, presumably causing the audience to roar with laughter, smack themselves on the forehead, and exclaim, "Hot damn, how the hell'd the Kardashians end up in thar? Hyuck, hyuck!" Their most recent efforts, the Hunger Games parody The Starving Games and the Hangover riff Best Night Ever, both sunk without a trace, meaning the jig might finally be up for these two rip-off artists.

The two are frequent nominees of the Golden Raspberry Awards. The first was a Worst Screenplay nomination for Epic Movie at the 2007 Razzies and the following year the pair were nominated for Worst Picture, Worst Director, and Worst Screenplay for both Meet the Spartans and Disaster Movie. At the 2011 Razzies, Vampires Suck was nominated for Worst Picture, Worst Director, Worst Screenplay, and Worst Prequel, Remake, Rip-Off or Sequel. Critic Josh Levin of Slate stated:

Isn't it massive consumer fraud to charge $10.50 for a barely hour-long movie? Perhaps, but it would've been unforgivable to make Meet the Spartans any longer than an hour. This was the worst movie I've ever seen, so bad that I hesitate to label it a "movie" and thus reflect shame upon the entire medium of film. Friedberg and Seltzer do not practice the same craft as P. T. Anderson, David Cronenberg, Michael Bay, Kevin Costner, The Zucker brothers, the Wayans Brothers, Uwe Boll, any dad who takes shaky home movies on a camping trip, or a bear who turns on a video camera by accident while trying to eat it. They are not filmmakers. They are evildoers, charlatans, symbols of Western civilization's decline under the weight of too many pop culture references.

Josh Rosenblatt of The Austin Chronicle said that "There's no nice way to say this, so I'll just say it: Writer/directors Friedberg and Seltzer are a scourge. They're a plague on our cinematic landscape, a national shame, a danger to our culture, a typhoon-sized natural disaster disguised as a filmmaking team, a Hollywood monster wreaking havoc on the minds of America's youth and setting civilization back thousands of years." Austin critic and animator Korey Coleman, of Spill.com and Double Toasted, has claimed that he is "bothered" by the duo's films, as he believes they are dumbing down the film industry and popular culture in general, and saying: "Yes, we all know that a lot of movies put aside the more artistic aspects of film making to solely make a profit; we're not naive. But, the films that these two directors make are so blatant at being nothing more than a juvenile finger pointing at an image or mention of a popular trend that, to me, they seem exploitive of a young culture raised to have an ever-decreasing attention span, thanks to the internet and channel surfing and, this may sound a little crazy, but, I think it shows a slight de-evolution in what people will accept as entertainment". Critic Nathan Rabin also gave their work an indignant condemnation, calling them "comedy antichrists" and saying about their films:

Spoof movies, as practiced by the cultural blight that is Seltzer-Friedberg, aren't just troubling from an aesthetic viewpoint. They're horrifying from a moral standpoint as well. The parody of the Zucker brothers and Mel Brooks is defined by love, knowledge, and appreciation: The Zucker brothers and Mel Brooks love, know, and appreciate the source material they're spoofing enough to get all the details perfect. The comedy of Seltzer-Friedberg, in sharp contrast, is defined by contempt: contempt for the attention span, intelligence, maturity, and frame of reference for the audience, and an even more raging contempt for the source material they're spoofing. Friedberg and Seltzer aren't writers; they're comic terrorists who cavalierly destroy what others create for their own ugly self-interest. Their success is entirely dependent on making comedy a dumber, crasser, less dignified place.

== Filmography ==
Year	Film	Directors	Writers	Producers	Rotten Tomatoes Approval Rating	Metacritic Score	Budget	Worldwide Gross
1996	Spy Hard	No	Yes	No	8%	25/100	$18 million	$84,960,191
2000	Scary Movie (Note: This film spawned the Scary Movie film series, but Friedberg and Seltzer have no involvement with the series' other films.)	No	Yes	No	51%	48/100	$19 million	$278,019,771
2006	Date Movie	Yes (Note: Only Aaron Seltzer was credited)	Yes	Yes (Note: Only Jason Friedberg was credited)	7%	11/100	$20 million	$84,795,656
2007	Epic Movie	Yes	Yes	Executive	2%	17/100	$20 million	$86,865,564
2008	Meet the Spartans	Yes	Yes	Yes	2%	9/100	$30 million	$84,646,831
2008	Disaster Movie	Yes	Yes	Yes	1%	15/100	$20 million	$34,816,824
2010	Vampires Suck	Yes	Yes	Yes	4%	18/100	$20 million	$80,547,866
2013	The Starving Games	Yes	Yes	No	0%		$4.5 million	$3,889,688
2013	Best Night Ever	Yes	Yes	Yes	0%	17/100		$289,511
2015	Superfast!	Yes	Yes	Yes	N/A (Note: Superfast! did not receive enough reviews to get a Tomatometer rating.)		$2.1 million	$2,075,731
