= Meet the Spartans =

2008 film by Jason Friedberg and Aaron Seltzer

- Theatrical release poster
- Directed by: Jason Friedberg; Aaron Seltzer
- Written by: Jason Friedberg; Aaron Seltzer
- Produced by: Jason Friedberg; Aaron Seltzer; Peter Safran
- Starring: Sean Maguire; Carmen Electra; Ken Davitian; Kevin Sorbo
- Cinematography: Shawn Maurer
- Edited by: Peck Prior
- Music by: Christopher Lennertz
- Production companies: Regency Enterprises; New Regency; 3 in the Box
- Distributed by: 20th Century Fox
- Release date: January 25, 2008
- Running time: 83 minutes
- Country: United States
- Language: English
- Budget: $30 million
- Box office: $84.6 million

Meet the Spartans is a 2008 American parody film written and directed by Jason Friedberg and Aaron Seltzer. The film is mainly a parody of the 2006 film 300, although it also references many other films, television shows, people and pop cultural events of the time, in a manner similar to previous films that Friedberg and Seltzer had been involved in such as Scary Movie, Date Movie and Epic Movie. The film stars Sean Maguire, Carmen Electra, Ken Davitian, and Kevin Sorbo.

Meet the Spartans was released on January 25, 2008 in the United States by 20th Century Fox. It was panned by critics and appeared on several lists of the worst films ever made. It went on to gross $84.6 million on a budget of $30 million.

== Plot ==
A Spartan elder inspects three babies. The first, an ugly, talking baby ogre, is abandoned to die for its deformity; while Brad Pitt and Angelina Jolie adopt the second, who is Vietnamese. The third, Leonidas, is accepted as a Spartan for his already-present muscular physique and is prepared for kinghood through brutal training. As an adult, Leonidas is cast out into the wild, survives the harsh winter, and hunts down a gangsta penguin named Mumble. Returning as king for his inauguration wearing a penguin skin hat, Leonidas sees Margo erotically dancing and asks her to marry him, to which she responds by giving him the combination to her armor-plated chastity belt.

Years later, Leonidas is training his son when Captain informs him that a Persian messenger has arrived. Accompanied by the Spartan politician Traitoro, the messenger presents Persian King Xerxes' demands for Sparta's submission. After growing angry with both the messenger's disrespect and finding him making out with his wife, Leonidas kicks him into a pit. Despite Traitoro's advice that the messenger's guards are now needed to convey the actual message, Leonidas kicks them in as well, along with Britney Spears and Kevin Federline, Sanjaya Malakar, Ryan Seacrest, and the American Idol judges Simon Cowell, Randy Jackson and Paula Abdul. Resolving to face the Persians, Leonidas visits the prophets and gives them medicines such as Neutrogena as their price for their consultation. They advise him that he should consult the Oracle for any advice. The Oracle Ugly Betty reveals that Leonidas will die should he go to war.

After deciding while spending the night with his wife, Leonidas meets the soldiers assembled for his departure to Thermopylae, and finds that only thirteen were accepted in the army due to stringent requirements. Among them are Captain, his son Sonio, and a slightly unfit Spartan named Dilio. Once at the Hot Gates, they encounter a deformed Paris Hilton, who tells Leonidas and the Captain about a secret goat path above the Hot Gates that Xerxes could use to outflank the Spartans. When she asks to be made a Spartan soldier, Leonidas rejects her as unqualified because she cannot use a spear correctly. Leonidas and his platoon soon face off with Xerxes' messenger and his Immortals, beating them in a dance contest before driving them off a cliff. Xerxes, impressed, personally approaches Leonidas and attempts to bribe him with a trip to the Palms Hotel and Casino. Leonidas declines, and the Spartans face the Persian army in a "Yo Momma" fight, which the Spartans win, but Dilio has his eyes scratched out and wanders away.

Deciding to betray the Spartans, Hilton tells Xerxes where the goat path is in return for various gifts and for having her deformed hump removed. Xerxes meets the twelve remaining Spartans and the war begins. Meanwhile, back in Sparta, Queen Margo has several confrontations with Traitoro, as he is the vital vote in sending more troops to assist her husband. Following her address to the council, Traitoro publicly betrays the Queen, who then battles him in a parody of Spider-Man 3 and defeats him using a dust buster. With Traitoro's deceit exposed, the council is united with the queen.

At the Battle of Thermopylae, the Persians introduce their secret weapons, Ghost Rider and Rocky Balboa, who kills Sonio with a decapitating uppercut. Captain avenges him with Botox poisoning before being struck down by Xerxes. Leonidas pursues Xerxes and plays Grand Theft Auto: San Andreas. Managing to find the "Transformer Cube", Xerxes uses it in a car to become Xerxestron and shows off his powers to access the "Leave Britney Alone!" video on YouTube. However, Xerxestron accidentally trips on his extension cord and falls on Leonidas and the surviving Spartans, killing them. The blind surviving Dilio eventually returns to Sparta to inform Queen Margo of Leonidas's death. A year later, Dilio leads a new, larger Spartan force to defeat the Persians, but the blind warrior ends up going the wrong way. They end up in Malibu, where they knock Lindsay Lohan down as she is leaving rehab again instead.

The film ends with the characters singing "I Will Survive" on the American Idol stage, as the credits appear.

== Cast ==
- Sean Maguire as King Leonidas
  - Zachary Dylan Smith as young Leonidas
- Kevin Sorbo as Captain Artemis
- Carmen Electra as Queen Margo
- Ken Davitian as King Xerxes
- Diedrich Bader as Councilman Traitoro
- Travis Van Winkle as Sonio
- Jareb Dauplaise as Dilio
- Nicole Parker as Paris Hilton, Britney Spears, Ellen DeGeneres, Paula Abdul
- Ike Barinholtz as Le Chiffre, Prophet, Dane Cook
- Hunter Clary as Leo Jr.
- Phil Morris as Messenger
- Method Man as Persian Emissary
- Andy Basargian as Brad Pitt
- Tiffany Claus as Angelina Jolie
- Nick Steele as Kevin Federline (Steele reprises his role from Date Movie)
- Winter Jones as Sanjaya Malakar
- Christopher Lett as Randy Jackson
- Jim Piddock as Loyalist, Simon Cowell
- Nate Haden as Ryan Seacrest
- Crista Flanagan as Oracle/Ugly Betty, Spartan Woman
- Robin Atkin Downes (uncredited) as Narrator
- Thomas McKenna as Tom Cruise
- Jesse Lewis IV as Ms. Jay Alexander
- Jenny Costa as Tyra Banks
- Belinda Waymouth as Twiggy
- Dean Cochran as Rocky Balboa, Rambo
- Emily Wilson as Lindsay Lohan
- John Di Domenico as Donald Trump
- Jim Nieb as George W. Bush
- Tiffany Haddish as Urban Girl

== Parodies ==
=== Movies ===
- 300 (2006)
- Shrek the Third (2007)
- Rocky Balboa (2006)
- Happy Feet (2006)
- Spider-Man 3 (2007)
- Spartacus (1960)
- Transformers (2007)
- Ghost Rider (2007)
- Stomp the Yard (2007)
- Casino Royale (2006)
- Rambo (2008)

=== TV shows ===
- American Idol (2002–2016)
- America's Next Top Model (2003–2018)
- Dancing with the Stars (2005–present)
- Deal or No Deal (2005–2009)
- Heroes (2006–2010)
- Ugly Betty (2006–2010)

=== Real-life people ===
- Britney Spears
- Simon Cowell
- Kevin Federline
- Sanjaya Malakar
- Lindsay Lohan
- Paris Hilton
- George W. Bush
- Chris Crocker
- Donald Trump

== Release ==
=== Box office ===
Meet the Spartans opened at number one at the US box office, grossing $18,505,530 over its opening weekend, narrowly edging out fellow newcomer Rambo, which was briefly parodied in the credits of this film. The film dropped 60.4% in its second weekend grossing $7,336,595 expanding to 2,643 theaters while ranking fourth at the box office. The film grossed $38,233,676 in United States and Canada and grossed $45,787,889 internationally, adding up to a total worldwide gross of $84,021,565.

=== Critical response ===
On the review aggregator website Rotten Tomatoes, 2% of 48 critics' reviews are positive, with an average rating of 2.4/10. The website's consensus reads: "A tired, unfunny, offensive waste of time, Meet the Spartans scrapes the bottom of the cinematic barrel." Metacritic, which uses a weighted average, assigned the film a score of 9 out of 100, based on 11 critics, indicating "overwhelming dislike". Audiences polled by CinemaScore gave the film an average grade of "C−" on an A+ to F scale.

Variety called it "Lazy, lame and painfully unfunny, Meet the Spartans is yet another scrambled-genre parody."

Frank Scheck of The Hollywood Reporter wrote: "Writer-directors Jason Friedberg and Aaron Seltzer basically reprise the tired formula from their earlier efforts, which is to throw in as many pop culture references as possible to cover up the lack of any real wit."

Jeannette Catsoulis of The New York Times gave it a 1 out of 5 and wrote: "Jason Friedberg and Aaron Seltzer, the team behind Meet the Spartans, prove that ridiculing other movies is much easier than making your own." Catsoulis said the various audience reactions at the screening she attended summed it up best: Eewwww! Aaarghh! Huh?

Critic Garth Franklin of Dark Horizons called it "One of the most painfully bad comedies I've ever had to endure, and I've seen the collected works of Martin Lawrence, Tim Allen, Ice Cube AND Cedric the Entertainer."

The Radio Times said, "After enduring the torturously unfunny Date Movie and Epic Movie, one could be forgiven for concluding that the art of cinematic parody was in terminal decline. This latest installment in Friedberg and Seltzer's franchise hammers a final nail into the coffin with an utterly atrocious collection of imbecilic skits... it's junk-food cinema at its worst. One cringes to think what future cultural historians will make of it... and us."

Clark Collis of Entertainment Weekly gave it a mixed review, crediting the actors for their efforts but criticizing the script and the already dated jokes, giving it a grade C−.

Most of the film's criticism consisted of not having many actual jokes and instead having an over-reliance on pop culture references. Several recurring gags were criticized for being overused, such as the ambiguous sexuality of the Spartans and throwing various celebrities down the Pit of Death.

The film's score by Christopher Lennertz was commended by Christian Clemmensen from Filmtracks.com, who considered it one of the biggest "guilty pleasures" of 2008.

=== Accolades ===
On January 21, 2009, the film received five nominations for the 29th Golden Raspberry Awards: Worst Picture (jointly with Disaster Movie), Worst Supporting Actress (Electra), Worst Director, Worst Screenplay, and Worst Prequel, Remake, Rip-Off, or Sequel.
