= Disaster Movie =

2008 American parody comedy film

- Theatrical release poster
- Directed by: Jason Friedberg; Aaron Seltzer
- Written by: Jason Friedberg; Aaron Seltzer
- Produced by: Peter Safran; Jason Friedberg; Aaron Seltzer
- Starring: Matt Lanter; Vanessa Minnillo; Gary "G Thang" Johnson; Nicole Parker; Crista Flanagan; Kim Kardashian; Ike Barinholtz; Carmen Electra; Tony Cox
- Cinematography: Shawn Maurer
- Edited by: Peck Prior
- Music by: Christopher Lennertz
- Production companies: Grosvenor Park; The Safran Company; 3 in the Box
- Distributed by: Lionsgate (United States); Summit Entertainment (Overseas)
- Release date: August 29, 2008
- Running time: 87 minutes
- Country: United States
- Language: English
- Budget: $20 million
- Box office: $34.8 million

Disaster Movie is a 2008 American parody film written and directed by Jason Friedberg and Aaron Seltzer and produced by Peter Safran, Friedberg, and Seltzer. It stars Matt Lanter, Vanessa Minnillo, Gary "G Thang" Johnson, Crista Flanagan, Nicole Parker, Ike Barinholtz, Carmen Electra, Tony Cox, and Kim Kardashian in her feature film debut. The film is mainly a parody of the disaster film genre, although it also references many other films, television shows, people, and pop culture events of the time.

Initially intended as a parody of Superbad, directors Friedberg and Seltzer transitioned the film as a satire of the disaster movie genre midway through production. The directors also reportedly used trailer footage to get an understanding of then upcoming films. Filming took place from April to June 2008, with the title getting revealed on the final day of the film's production.

The film was theatrically released by Lionsgate in the United States on August 29, 2008, and was universally panned by critics and also received generally negative reviews from audiences, with many considering it to be the worst "movie" directed by Friedberg and Seltzer. The film is often listed as one of the lowest-rated films of the 2000s, and one of the worst films of all time. It was also a financial disappointment compared to Friedberg and Seltzer's previous films, grossing $34.8 million on $20 million budget. At the 29th Golden Raspberry Awards, the film received six nominations.

== Plot ==
In the year 10,001 B.C., a caveman runs away from a predator through a plain and immediately gets into a fight with Wolf. After defeating him, the caveman then encounters the predator, a saber-toothed, gasoline-drinking Amy Winehouse, who informs him that the world will end on August 29, 2008, and that their fate lies in a Crystal Skull.

The sequence is then revealed to be a dream of everyman Will in the present day. He then finds out that his girlfriend Amy is having an affair with Flavor Flav, and she breaks up with Will because he is not admitting his true feelings for her.

Later that day, Will has a "Super Duper Sweet Sixteen" party at his house, despite being 25. The guests include Juney, Dr. Phil, Will's best friend Calvin, and Anton Chigurh, among others. During the party, Amy arrives with her new boyfriend, a Calvin Klein underwear model. The party then comes to a halt when the room shakes and the lights go out. A bulletin on the radio claims there is a meteor shower and it is the end of the world. Soon after, the city starts to freeze over, and Will, Juney, Calvin, and Calvin's girlfriend Lisa retreat to a garage for shelter. When Juney mentions that the calamities are caused by global warming, Will realizes his dream as a caveman could be related. Later, Will is chided by the others for not committing himself to his relationship with Amy.

The gang leaves the garage and Will gets a call from Amy, where he admits his feelings for her before the call is dropped. He decides to go to rescue Amy. Lisa is later killed by a meteor. While the others comfort a distraught Calvin, Giselle, a prostitute, climbs out of a manhole and gets hit by a taxi. Calvin catches her, and they immediately fall in love with each other. Giselle's pimp, Prince Edwin, challenges Calvin to a dance fight for her love, but a tornado appears and Prince Edwin flees. Iron Man, Hellboy, and the Hulk attempt to fight it, but all are defeated by cows thrown by the tornado. After taking shelter, Will, Juney, Calvin, and Giselle encounter rabid knockoffs of Alvin and the Chipmunks, who attack the gang and eat Juney alive, killing both her and her unborn baby in the process. The "Chipmunks" then go after Will and Calvin, but they trap them in a trash can, fatally suffocating them as they attempt to escape.

On their way to the museum where Amy is trapped, the group runs into Batman, who informs them that they must go to evacuation buses and that there will be no chance of survival if they go to save Amy. With time against them, Princess Giselle kills Speed Racer, and the group hijacks his Mach Five, which contains Michael Jackson and Bubbles in the trunk, to drive to the museum. At the museum, they save Amy, who reveals that the Crystal Skull is the only thing that can stop the end of the world. Calvin and the Princess then find that the museum doors are closed and all of the artifacts have come alive, including Po from Kung Fu Panda, who fist-fights and duels Calvin but is then defeated. When Calvin makes out with the Princess, Calvin accidentally pulls her wig and discovers that she is actually a transvestite. While this happens, "Po" takes out a katana and simultaneously kills Calvin and the Princess.

Meanwhile, Will and Amy run into a nude Beowulf, who fights with Will. After Amy stabs "Beowulf" in the back, Will and Amy encounter Indiana Jones, who is revealed to be Will's father. "Indy" tries to put the Crystal Skull on the altar, but he flies through a stained glass window in the room. Will does it instead, and he averts further destruction. Will and Amy have a wedding ceremony performed by "The Guru Shitka", which ends with a musical number about all of the characters in the film dating each other (having sex in the unrated version) parodying "I'm Fucking Matt Damon" by Sarah Silverman and the film closes with the "Chipmunks" getting crushed to death by a falling cow before the credits start to roll.

== Cast ==
- Matt Lanter as Will / Troy Bolton
- Vanessa Minnillo as Amy / Gabriella Montez
- Gary 'G Thang' Johnson as Calvin / Chad Danforth
- Crista Flanagan as Juney / Hannah Montana
- Nicole Parker as Enchanted Princess / Amy Winehouse / Jessica Simpson
- Kim Kardashian as Lisa Taylor / Taylor McKessie
- Ike Barinholtz as Wolf / Anton Chigurh / Prince Caspian / The Policeman / Hellboy / Batman / Beowulf
- Carmen Electra as The Beautiful Assassin
- Tony Cox as Indiana Jones
- Tad Hilgenbrink as Prince Edwin
- Nick Steele as Underwear Model
- Jason Boegh as Carrie Bradshaw
- Valerie Wildman as Samantha Jones
- John Di Domenico as Dr. Phil / The Guru Shitka
- Abe Spigner as Flavor Flav
- Christopher Johnson as Michael Jackson
- Jared S. Eddo as Speed Racer
- Yoshio Iizuka as Kung Fu Panda
- Jonas Neal as Justin Timberlake
- Jacob Tolano Wood as Dr. Bruce Banner
- Roland Kickinger as The Incredible Hulk
- Walter Harris as John Hancock
- Gerard Facchini as Iron Man
- Johnny Rock as Male Giselle (Enchanted Princess' dance double)
- Devin Crittenden as Paulie Bleeker
- Noah Harpster as Seth
- Austin Michael Scott as McLover

== Parodies ==
=== Films and TV shows ===
- Cloverfield (2008)
- Twister (1996)
- Indiana Jones and the Kingdom of the Crystal Skull (2008)
- 10,000 BC (2008)
- American Gladiators (2008)
- My Super Sweet 16 (2005–2008)
- Armageddon (1998) (main title)
- Juno (2007)
- Enchanted (2007)
- High School Musical (2006)
- Alvin and the Chipmunks (2007)
- Kung Fu Panda (2008)
- The Dark Knight (2008)
- WWE (1980–present)
- The Incredible Hulk (2008)
- Step Up 2: The Streets (2008)
- Iron Man (2008)
- Hellboy II: The Golden Army (2008)
- Sex and the City (2008)
- Hancock (2008)
- Superbad (2007)
- Night at the Museum (2006)
- HeadOn commercial (2006)
- World Trade Center (2006)
- The Love Guru (2008)
- Hannah Montana (2006–2008)
- Beowulf (2007)
- Speed Racer (2008)
- The Shining (1980)
- I Am Legend (2007)
- The Day After Tomorrow (2004)
- Jumper (2008)
- Star Wars: The Clone Wars (2008)
- No Country for Old Men (2007)
- Wanted (2008)
- The Matrix Revolutions (2003)
- The Chronicles of Narnia: Prince Caspian (2008)
- An Inconvenient Truth (2006)
- You Don't Mess with the Zohan (2008)
- Get Smart (2008)

=== Real-life people ===
- Miley Cyrus
- Amy Winehouse
- Michael Jackson
- Flavor Flav
- Kanye West
- Will Smith
- Soulja Boy
- Hollywood Yates
- Dr. Phil
- Jonas Brothers
- Jessica Simpson
- Sarah Silverman
- Matt Damon
- Justin Timberlake
- Vince Vaughn

== Production ==
On April 2, 2008, less than three months after the release of the duo Jason Friedberg and Aaron Seltzer's previous spoof film Meet the Spartans, it was announced that the duo were in pre-production on a spoof of Superbad under the working title known as Goodie Two Shoes. The duo wrote the film as a parody of Superbad, but similar to the duo's previous films, it would parody some of the big blockbusters and popular celebrities from 2007 and 2008. Since many of the films being spoofed were not released at the time that the script was being written, Friedberg and Seltzer used trailer footage to get the basic idea of the films. By the time they finished writing, the idea had transformed into parodying the string of disaster movies that saw release in recent years, and not only that but also parodying the aforementioned pop culture of those years to an even greater degree than before (to the point the film would use the tagline, "Your favorite movies are about to be destroyed").

On April 28, Matt Lanter, Vanessa Minnillo, Gary "G Thang" Johnson and Carmen Electra signed up to be the main cast members. Matt Lanter was cast as the lead character, Will, while Vanessa Minnillo played Amy. Gary "G Thang" Johnson took on the role of Calvin, and Carmen Electra portrayed the Beautiful Assassin. Filming took place in the state of Louisiana from April 28 to June 6. Oscar-nominated production designer William Elliott (who had previously done production design on the duo's films since Date Movie), did the production design for the sets. The Chamber of Commerce building in Shreveport was used for filming the natural history museum scenes in the film. After the filming had ended, Friedberg and Seltzer had confirmed the real title for the film was Disaster Movie.

== Release ==
The film was released in theatres on August 29, 2008, and unlike the duo's previous directed films, which were financed by Regency Enterprises and distributed by 20th Century Fox, this film was financed by Grosvenor Park and was distributed by Lionsgate in the United States. The film's theatrical trailer debuted online on June 23, 2008. Around the same time, a contest was hosted by the studio where fans have to make posters parodying recent blockbuster movies. Only four posters―all of which have parodied original posters for The Day After Tomorrow, The Simpsons Movie, Indiana Jones and the Kingdom of the Crystal Skull, and Knocked Up―were made.

=== Home media ===
Disaster Movie was released on DVD and Blu-ray by Lionsgate Home Entertainment on January 6, 2009. Respectively, both releases included an Unrated "Cataclysmic" Edition and the theatrical version, both with the same extras. About 410,934 DVD units were sold, bringing in $8,447,690 in revenue as of October 2009.

== Reception ==
=== Box office ===
On its domestic theatrical debut, Disaster Movie grossed $2,023,130 on its opening day, $5,836,973 over the three-day weekend, and $6,945,535 over the four-day weekend (including Labor Day). It ranked #7 for both the three- and four-day weekends. The film's takings for the weekend fell far short of the $17 million predicted by the Dallas Morning News. The film was not as commercially successful as previous Friedberg/Seltzer releases. On a $20 million budget, it grossed $14,190,901 domestically and $20,625,923 internationally for a worldwide total of $34,816,824, less than half the gross of Meet the Spartans.

=== Critical response ===
On Rotten Tomatoes, the film has an approval percentage of 1% based on 72 reviews, with the critics consensus reading: "Returning to their seemingly bottomless well of flatulence humor, racial stereotypes, and stale pop culture gags, Jason Friedberg and Aaron Seltzer have produced what is arguably their worst Movie yet." On Metacritic, the film has a score of 15 out of 100 based on 12 critic reviews, meaning "Overwhelming Dislike". Audiences polled by CinemaScore gave the film a rare average grade of "F" on an A+ to F scale.

Jason Solomons of The Guardian wrote that "Nothing can convey the grimness of Disaster Movie, which would be the Worst Movie Ever Made were it actually a movie at all." Adam Tobias of the Watertown Daily Times opined, "I just don't see how anyone could not find Disaster Movie one of the worst films of all time," further adding that the title of the film was appropriate, because the movie is "a disaster." The Times newspaper named the film the worst of 2008.

One of the two major positive reviews posted on Rotten Tomatoes was by Jim Schembri from the Australian newspaper The Age. Schembri called it "dumb but also undeniably funny in more spots than a right-thinking mature person feels comfortable admitting", the film was given 3½ stars out of five. The second, and most positive major critic review listed on Rotten Tomatoes (and the only major positive one on Metacritic) was by Owen Gleiberman of Entertainment Weekly, who gave the film a C+ and remarked: "The movie is merciless sending up Juno's self-satisfied hipster gobbledygook, and it's quite funny to see Hannah Montana still promoting her tie-in products as she lies crushed and dying under a meteor." Gleiberman previously contributed the only positive review listed on either site (out of 17 at Metacritic and 57 at Rotten Tomatoes) of Friedberg and Seltzer's earlier effort Epic Movie.

=== Worst lists ===
It was featured in Empire's 50 Worst Movies Ever poll, in 14th place. In 2012 it was included in Total Film's 66 Worst Movies Ever list. The MRQE's included it on its 50 Worst Movies list, where it has a score of 19, one of the lowest scores on the site. Disaster Movie became the lowest ranked film on IMDb's Bottom 100 list days after its premiere.

=== Accolades ===
On January 21, 2009, the film received six nominations for the 29th Golden Raspberry Awards. The nominations were for Worst Picture, Worst Supporting Actress (Electra), Worst Supporting Actress (Kardashian), Worst Director, Worst Screenplay, and Worst Prequel, Remake, Rip-Off, or Sequel (the latter three categories were shared with Meet the Spartans). Kardashian acknowledged her nomination on her blog, where she commented, "It's an honor just being nominated!"

Year	Association	Category	Recipient(s)	Result
2009	Golden Raspberry Awards	Worst Picture	Jason Friedberg, Aaron Seltzer, and Peter Safran (jointly with Meet the Spartans)	Nominated
2009	Golden Raspberry Awards	Worst Supporting Actress	Kim Kardashian	Nominated
2009	Golden Raspberry Awards	Worst Supporting Actress	Carmen Electra	Nominated
2009	Golden Raspberry Awards	Worst Prequel, Remake, Rip-off or Sequel	(jointly with Meet the Spartans)	Nominated
2009	Golden Raspberry Awards	Worst Director	Jason Friedberg and Aaron Seltzer (jointly with Meet the Spartans)	Nominated
2009	Golden Raspberry Awards	Worst Screenplay	Jason Friedberg and Aaron Seltzer (jointly with Meet the Spartans)	Nominated

== Legacy ==
American actor Kevin Spacey later mocked the film in 2008 when sitting alongside Simon Mayo and Mark Kermode during mentioning about the UK's top ten Box Office.

In a 2017 episode of the ABC show Big Fan, Kim Kardashian revealed that she is mortified by her character's death scene in the film and she "can't watch" [it].

== See also ==
- List of 21st century films considered the worst
