= Shawn Maurer =

American cinematographer

- Years active: 1988–present

Shawn Maurer is an American cinematographer.

== Filmography ==
=== Feature film ===
Year	Title	Director	Notes
1996	Bandwagon	John Schultz	
1997	The Big Empty	Jack Perez	
1997	Academy Boyz	Dennis Cooper	
1998	La Cucaracha	Jack Perez	
1998	Show & Tell	Dean Pollack	
2000	Bring It On	Peyton Reed	
2001	Run Ronnie Run!	Troy Miller	
2002	Like Mike	John Schultz	
2002	Boat Trip	Mort Nathan	
2003	When Zachary Beaver Came to Town	John Schultz	
2004	Johnson Family Vacation	Christopher Erskin	With Jeff Barnett
2005	The Honeymooners	John Schultz	
2006	Date Movie	Jason Friedberg; Aaron Seltzer	
2006	Caffeine	John Cosgrove	
2007	Epic Movie	Jason Friedberg; Aaron Seltzer	
2008	Meet the Spartans	Jason Friedberg; Aaron Seltzer	
2008	Disaster Movie	Jason Friedberg; Aaron Seltzer	
2009	Black Dynamite	Scott Sanders	
2010	Vampires Suck	Jason Friedberg; Aaron Seltzer	
2011	Some Guy Who Kills People	Jack Perez	
2011	Judy Moody and the Not Bummer Summer	John Schultz	
2012	Thunderstruck	John Whitesell	
2013	The Starving Games	Jason Friedberg; Aaron Seltzer	
2013	Best Night Ever	Jason Friedberg; Aaron Seltzer	
2014	Lost Summer	Anna Chi	
2015	Superfast!	Jason Friedberg; Aaron Seltzer	
2017	Daisy Winters	Beth LaMure	
