= 31st Golden Raspberry Awards =

Award ceremony presented by the Golden Raspberry Award Foundation in 2010

- Date: February 26, 2011
- Site: Barnsdall Gallery Theatre, Los Angeles, California

Highlights
- Worst Picture: The Last Airbender
- Most awards: The Last Airbender (5)
- Most nominations: The Last Airbender / The Twilight Saga: Eclipse (9)

The 31st Golden Raspberry Awards, or Razzies, was a parodic award ceremony that was held on February 26, 2011, at the Barnsdall Gallery Theatre in Hollywood, California, to identify the worst films the film industry had to offer in 2010, according to votes from members of the Golden Raspberry Foundation. Razzies co-founder John J. B. Wilson has stated that the intent of the awards is "to be funny." The nominations were announced on January 24. Per Razzies tradition, both the nominee announcements and ceremony preceded the corresponding Academy Awards functions by one day. The Last Airbender was the big winner of 2010, with five awards, including Worst Picture.

== Winners and nominees ==
Winner (in bold)

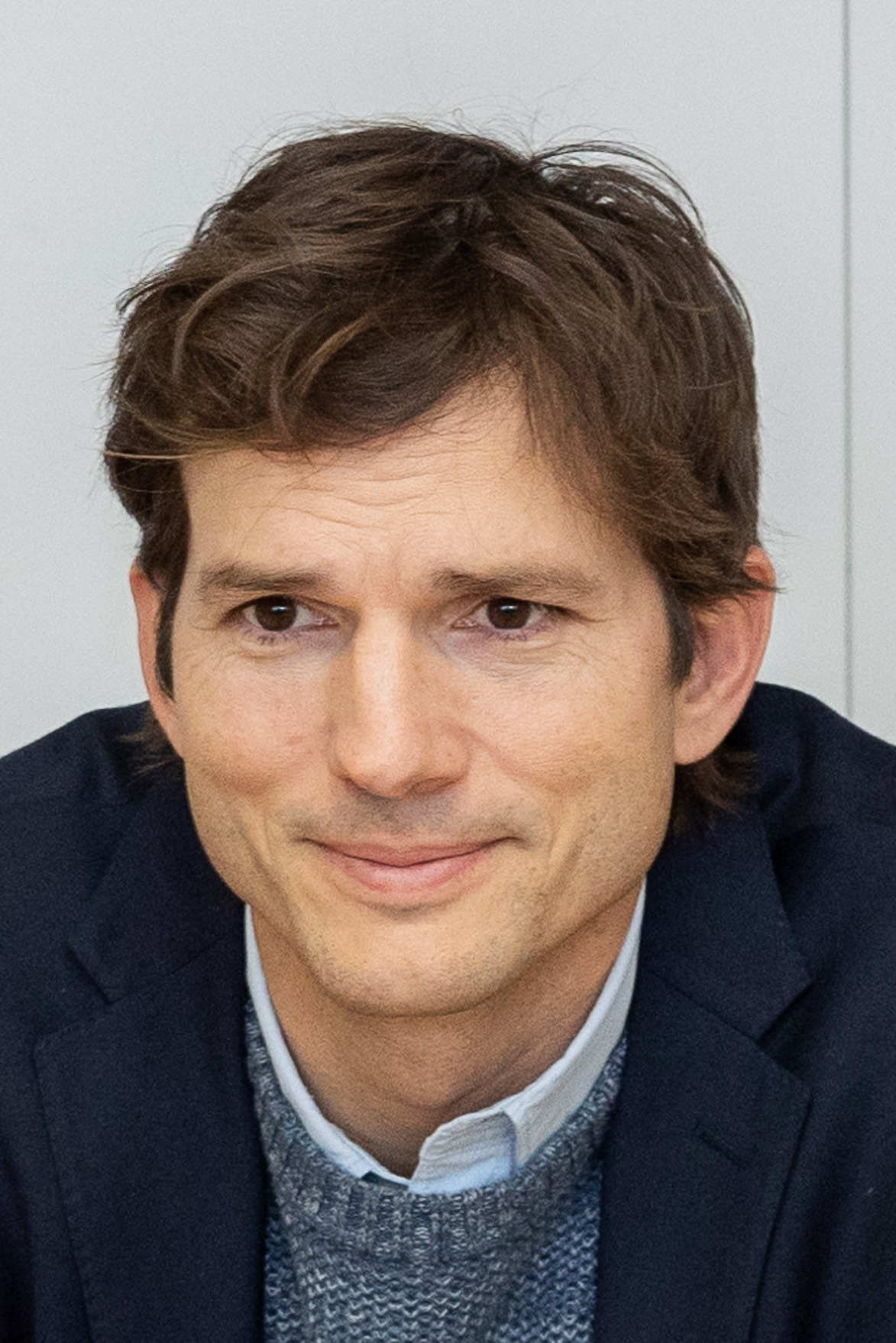
Ashton Kutcher, Worst Actor winner

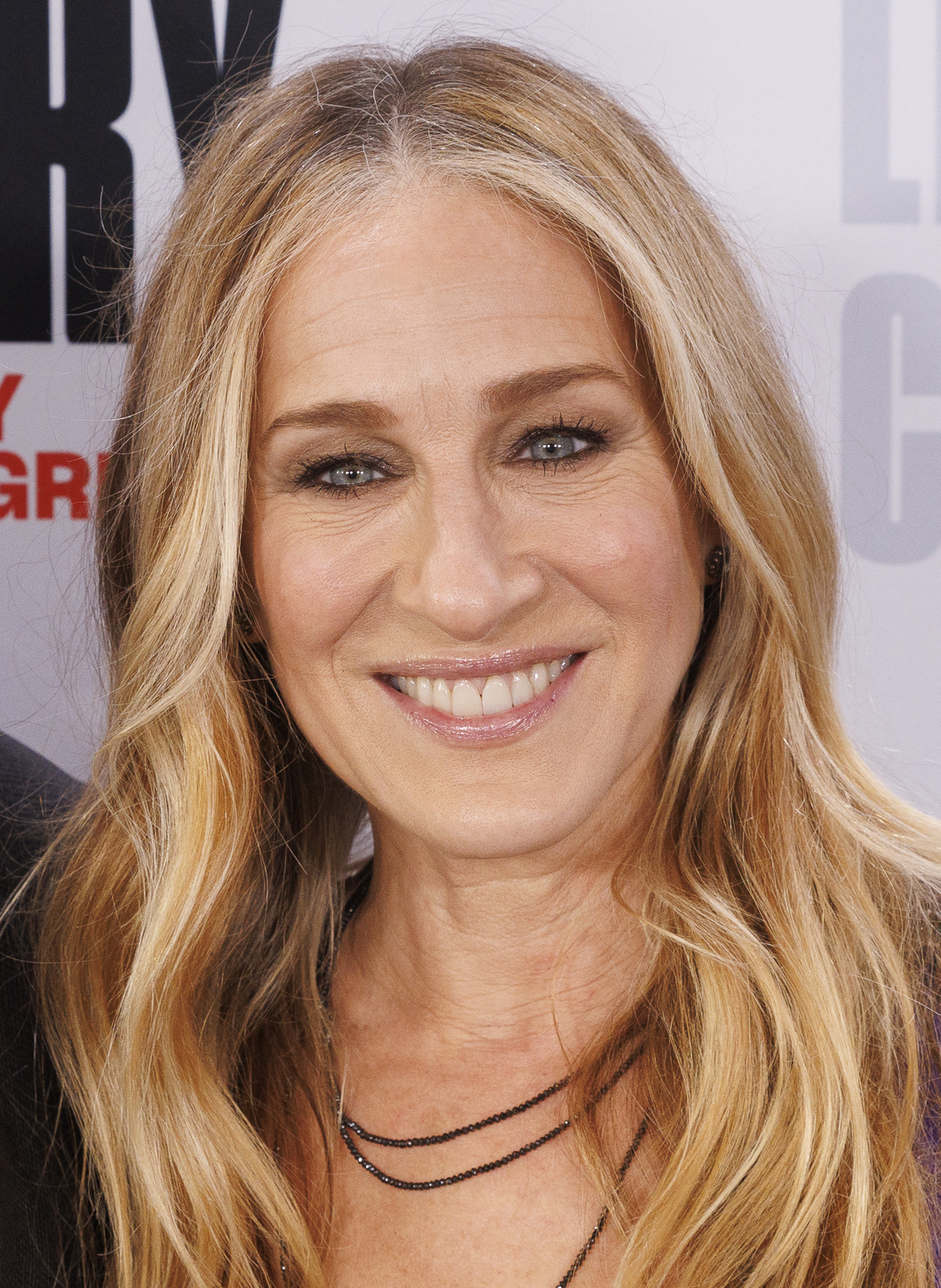
Sarah Jessica Parker, Worst Actress co-winner

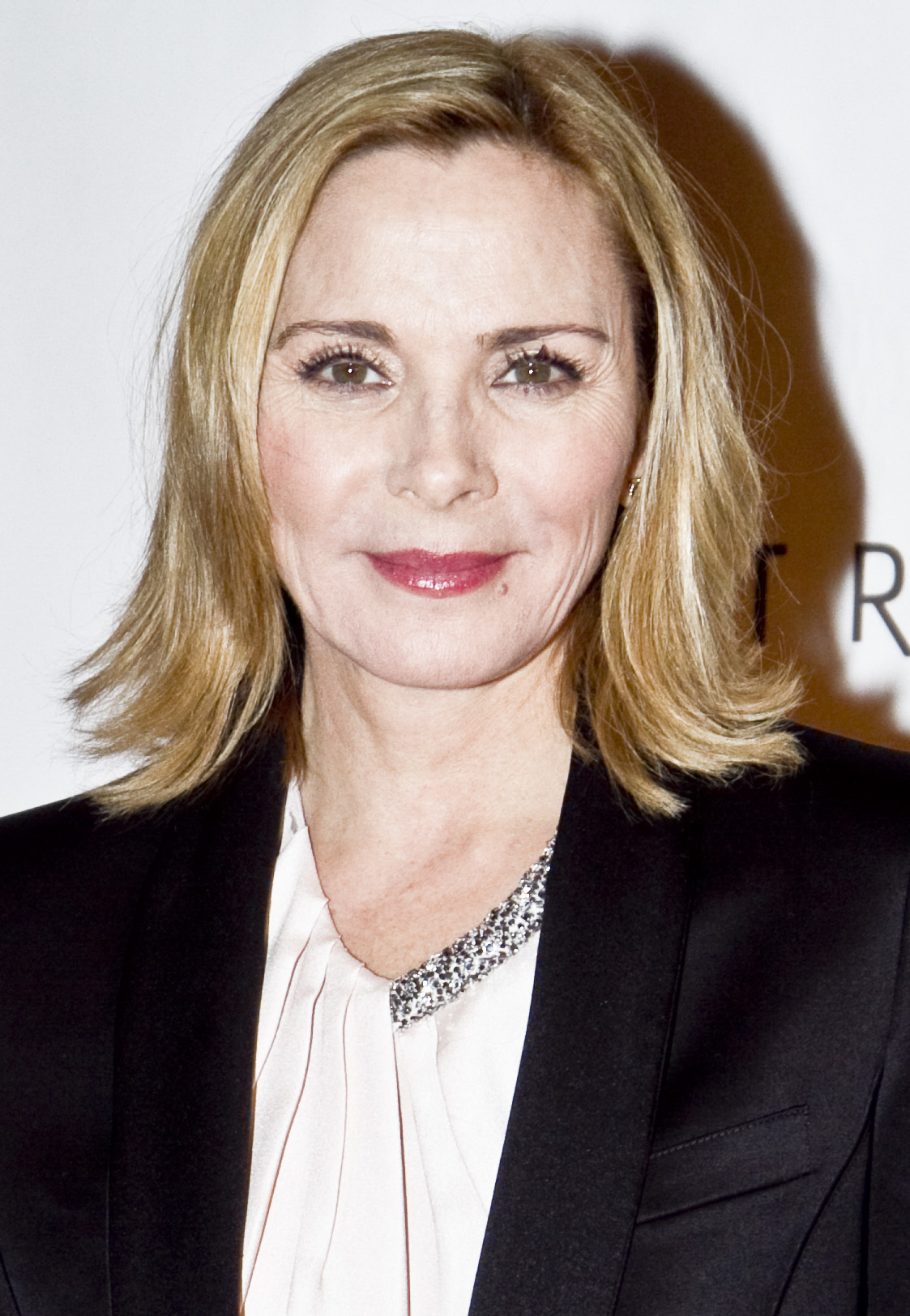
Kim Cattrall, Worst Actress co-winner

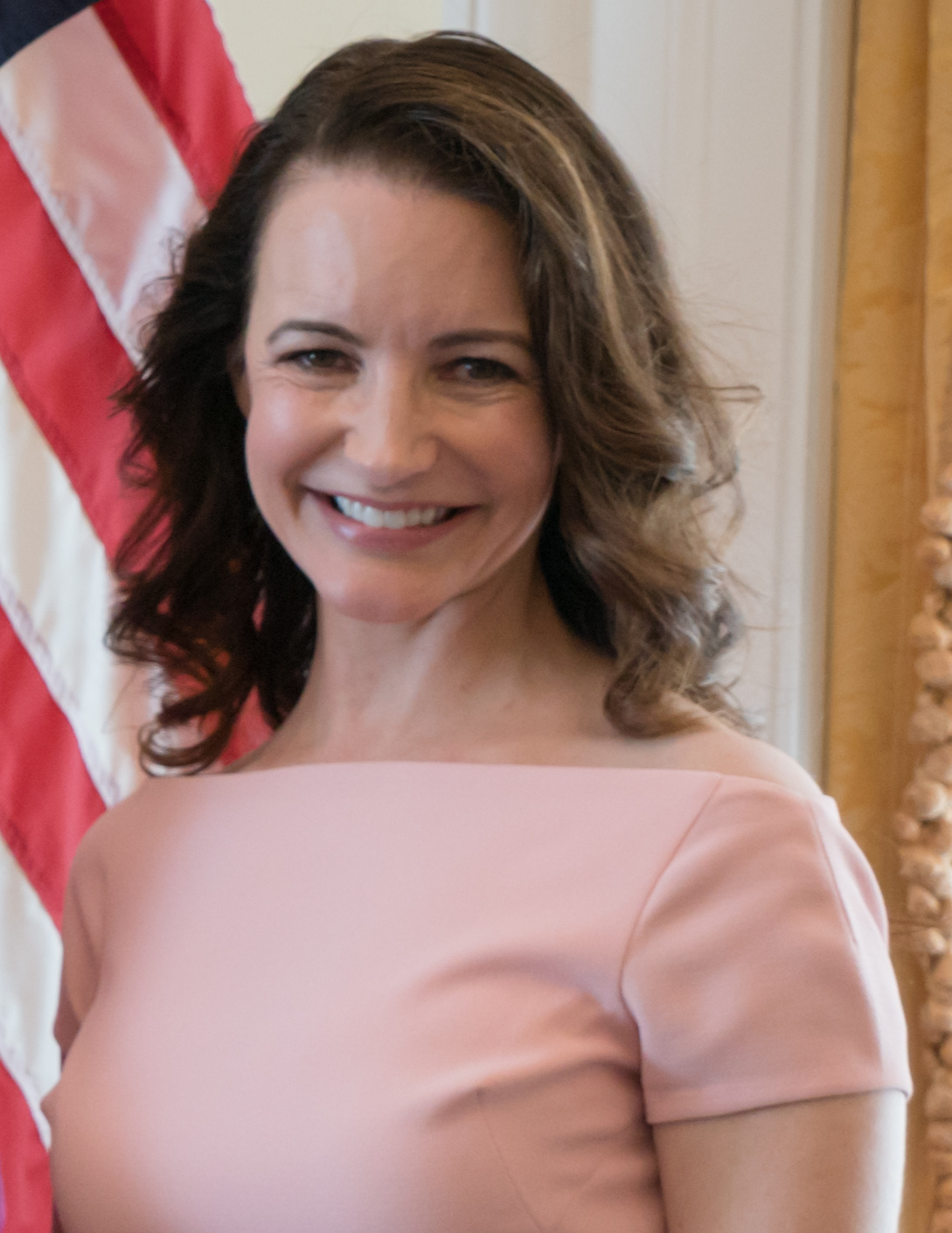
Kristin Davis, Worst Actress co-winner

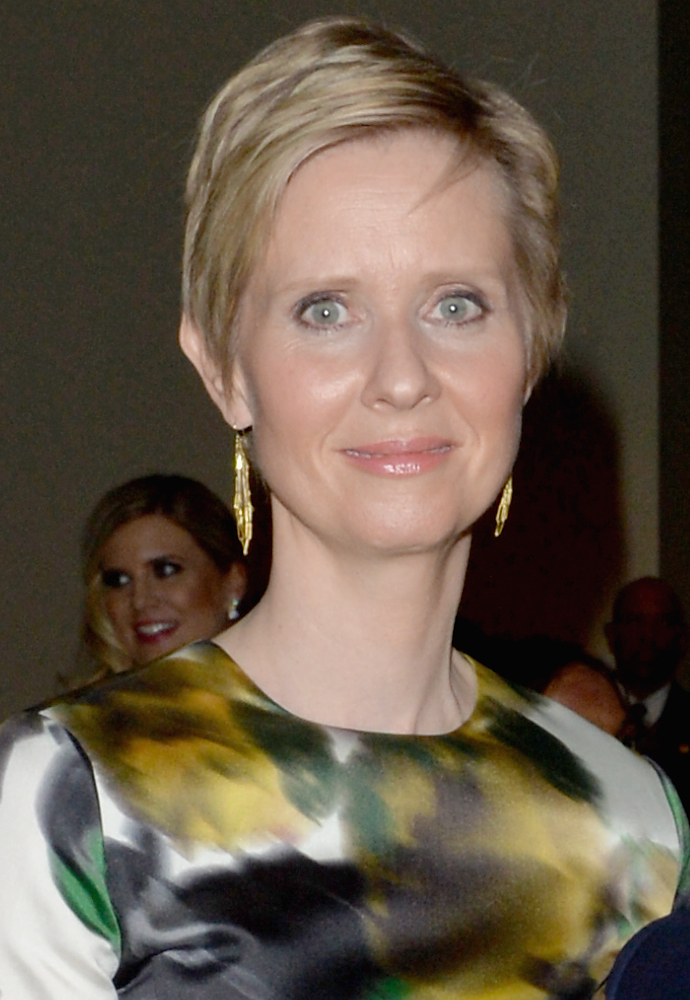
Cynthia Nixon, Worst Actress co-winner

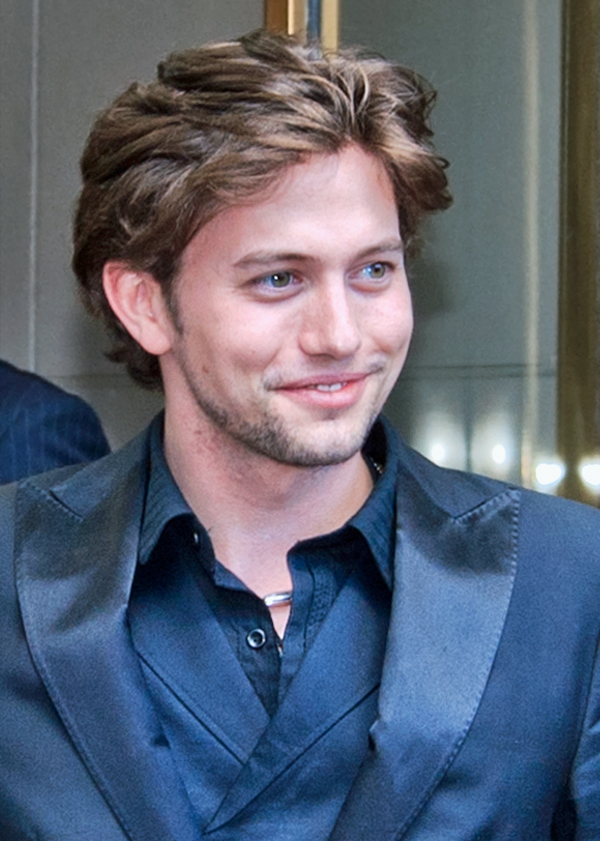
Jackson Rathbone, Worst Supporting Actor winner

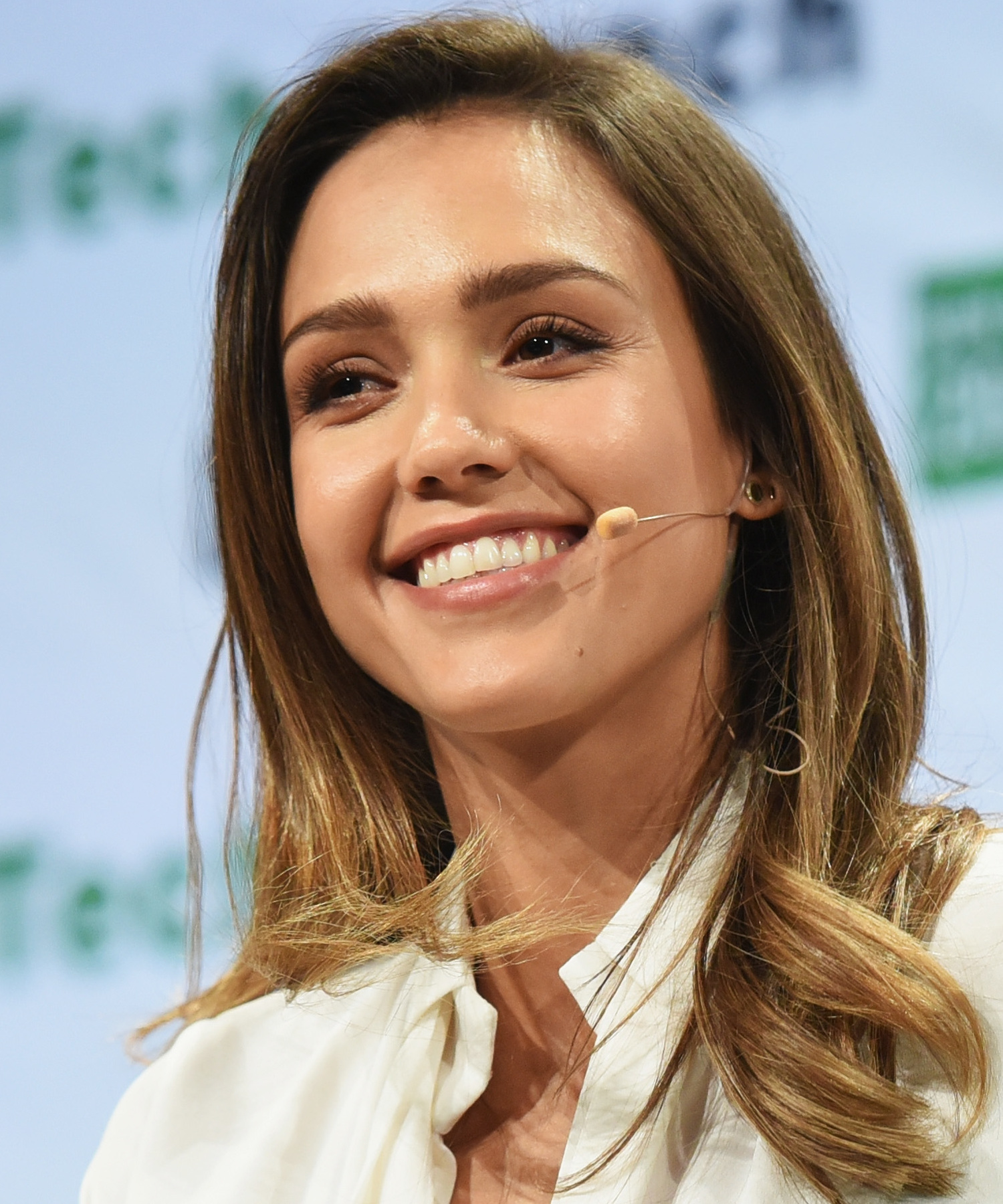
Jessica Alba, Worst Supporting Actress winner

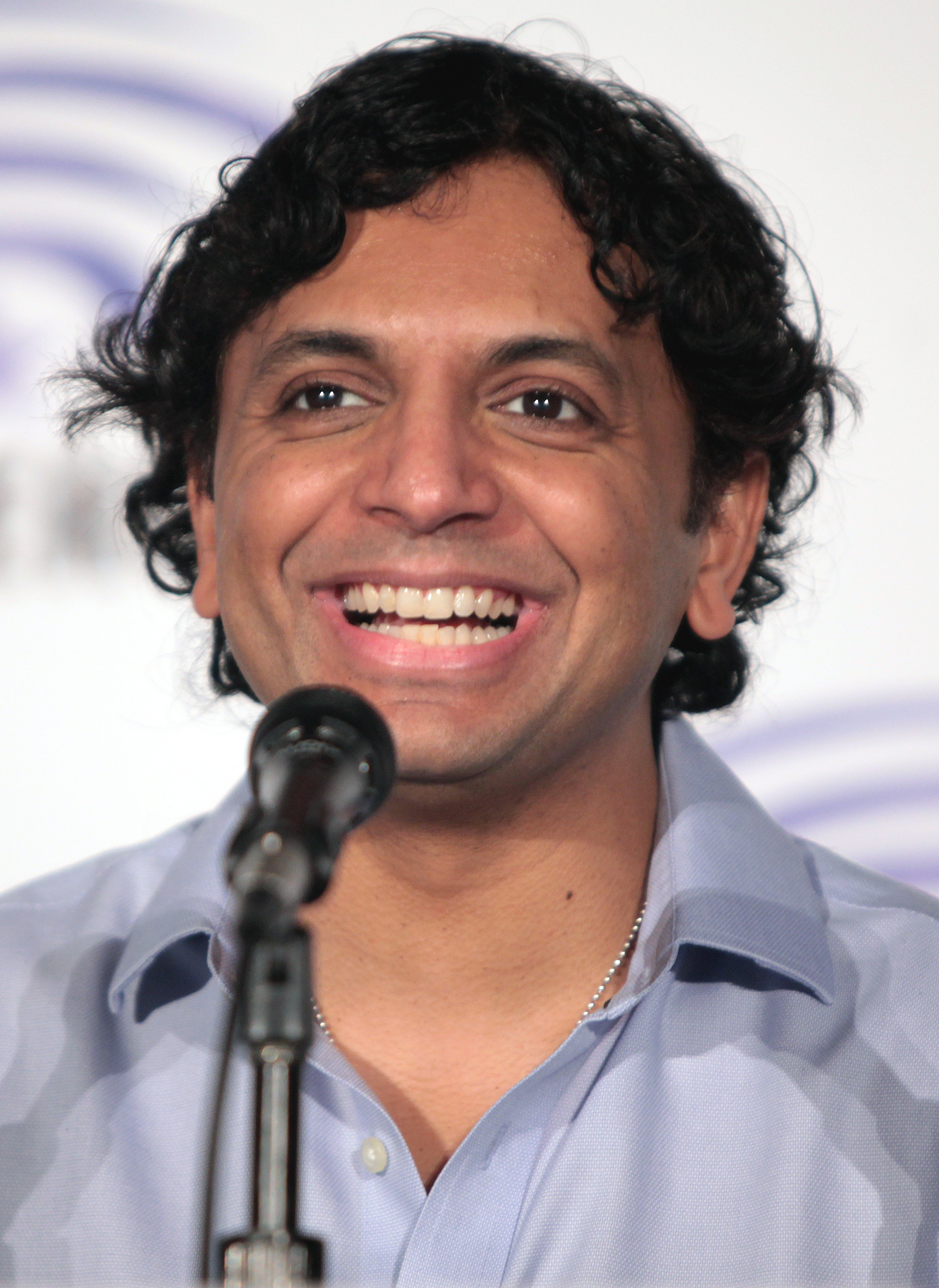
M. Night Shyamalan, Worst Director and Worst Screenplay winner

Category	Recipient
Worst Picture	**The Last Airbender (Paramount / Nickelodeon)**
Worst Picture	The Bounty Hunter (Columbia)
Worst Picture	Sex and the City 2 (New Line / HBO / Village Roadshow)
Worst Picture	The Twilight Saga: Eclipse (Summit Entertainment)
Worst Picture	Vampires Suck (20th Century Fox / Regency)
Worst Actor	**Ashton Kutcher in Killers and Valentine's Day as Spencer Aimes and Reed Bennett (respectively)**
Worst Actor	Jack Black in Gulliver's Travels as Lemuel Gulliver
Worst Actor	Gerard Butler in The Bounty Hunter as Milo Boyd
Worst Actor	Taylor Lautner in The Twilight Saga: Eclipse and Valentine's Day as Jacob Black and William "Willy" Harrington (respectively)
Worst Actor	Robert Pattinson in Remember Me and The Twilight Saga: Eclipse as Tyler Hawkins and Edward Cullen (respectively)
Worst Actress	**The Four "Gal Pals" (Sarah Jessica Parker, Kim Cattrall, Kristin Davis & Cynthia Nixon) in Sex and the City 2 as Carrie Bradshaw, Samantha Jones, Charlotte York, and Miranda Hobbes (respectively)**
Worst Actress	Jennifer Aniston in The Bounty Hunter and The Switch as Nicole Hurley and Kassie Larson (respectively)
Worst Actress	Miley Cyrus in The Last Song as Veronica "Ronnie" Miller
Worst Actress	Megan Fox in Jonah Hex as Lilah
Worst Actress	Kristen Stewart in The Twilight Saga: Eclipse as Bella Swan
Worst Supporting Actor	**Jackson Rathbone in The Last Airbender and The Twilight Saga: Eclipse as Sokka and Jasper Hale (respectively)**
Worst Supporting Actor	Billy Ray Cyrus in The Spy Next Door as Colton James
Worst Supporting Actor	George Lopez in Marmaduke (voice only), The Spy Next Door, and Valentine's Day as Carlos, Glaze, and Alphonso Rodriguez (respectively)
Worst Supporting Actor	Dev Patel in The Last Airbender as Zuko
Worst Supporting Actor	Rob Schneider in Grown Ups as Rob Hilliard
Worst Supporting Actress	**Jessica Alba in The Killer Inside Me, Little Fockers, Machete, and Valentine's Day as Joyce Lakeland, Andi Garcia, Sartana Rivera, and Morley Clarkson (respectively)**
Worst Supporting Actress	Cher in Burlesque as Tess
Worst Supporting Actress	Liza Minnelli (as herself) in Sex and the City 2
Worst Supporting Actress	Nicola Peltz in The Last Airbender as Katara
Worst Supporting Actress	Barbra Streisand in Little Fockers as Roz Focker
Worst Screen Couple / Screen Ensemble	**The entire cast of Sex and the City 2**
Worst Screen Couple / Screen Ensemble	Jennifer Aniston and Gerard Butler in The Bounty Hunter
Worst Screen Couple / Screen Ensemble	Josh Brolin's face and Megan Fox's accent in Jonah Hex
Worst Screen Couple / Screen Ensemble	The entire cast of The Last Airbender
Worst Screen Couple / Screen Ensemble	The entire cast of The Twilight Saga: Eclipse
Worst Prequel, Remake, Rip-off or Sequel	**Sex and the City 2 (New Line)**
Worst Prequel, Remake, Rip-off or Sequel	Clash of the Titans (Warner Bros.)
Worst Prequel, Remake, Rip-off or Sequel	The Last Airbender (Paramount / Nickelodeon)
Worst Prequel, Remake, Rip-off or Sequel	The Twilight Saga: Eclipse (Summit)
Worst Prequel, Remake, Rip-off or Sequel	Vampires Suck (20th Century Fox)
Worst Director	**M. Night Shyamalan for The Last Airbender**
Worst Director	Jason Friedberg and Aaron Seltzer for Vampires Suck
Worst Director	Michael Patrick King for Sex and the City 2
Worst Director	David Slade for The Twilight Saga: Eclipse
Worst Director	Sylvester Stallone for The Expendables
Worst Screenplay	**The Last Airbender (screenplay by M. Night Shyamalan, based on the TV series created by Michael Dante DiMartino and Bryan Konietzko)**
Worst Screenplay	Little Fockers (screenplay by John Hamburg and Larry Stuckey, based on characters created by Greg Glienna and Mary Ruth Clarke)
Worst Screenplay	Sex and the City 2 (screenplay by Michael Patrick King, based on the TV series created by Darren Star)
Worst Screenplay	The Twilight Saga: Eclipse (screenplay by Melissa Rosenberg, based on the novel by Stephenie Meyer)
Worst Screenplay	Vampires Suck (written by Jason Friedberg and Aaron Seltzer)
Worst Eye-Gouging Misuse of 3-D	**The Last Airbender (Paramount / Nickelodeon)**
Worst Eye-Gouging Misuse of 3-D	Cats & Dogs: The Revenge of Kitty Galore (Warner Bros.)
Worst Eye-Gouging Misuse of 3-D	Clash of the Titans (Warner Bros.)
Worst Eye-Gouging Misuse of 3-D	The Nutcracker (Freestyle Releasing)
Worst Eye-Gouging Misuse of 3-D	Saw 3D (Lionsgate)

== Films with multiple nominations and wins ==
These films received multiple nominations:

Nominations	Films
9	The Last Airbender
9	The Twilight Saga: Eclipse
7	Sex and the City 2
4	The Bounty Hunter
4	Valentine's Day
4	Vampires Suck
3	Little Fockers
2	Clash of the Titans
2	Jonah Hex
2	The Spy Next Door

These films won multiple awards:

Wins	Films
5	The Last Airbender
3	Sex and the City 2
2	Valentine's Day

== See also ==
- 83rd Academy Awards
