= Best Night Ever =

- Film poster
- Directed by: Jason Friedberg; Aaron Seltzer
- Written by: Jason Friedberg; Aaron Seltzer
- Produced by: Jason Blum; Peter Safran; Jason Friedberg; Aaron Seltzer
- Starring: Desiree Hall; Eddie Ritchard; Samantha Colburn; Crista Flanagan
- Cinematography: Shawn Maurer
- Edited by: Peck Prior
- Production companies: Blumhouse Productions; The Safran Company; 3 in The Box
- Distributed by: Magnet Releasing
- Release date: December 26, 2013
- Running time: 90 minutes
- Country: United States
- Language: English
- Box office: $289,511

Best Night Ever is a 2013 American independent found footage comedy film written and directed by Jason Friedberg and Aaron Seltzer and produced by Jason Blum, Friedberg and Seltzer. The film took place in Boston, Massachusetts and Las Vegas, Nevada.

== Plot ==
Things go from bad to worse for Claire, Zoe, Leslie, and Janet when they start Claire's bachelorette party in Vegas. Leslie's credit cards are canceled by her soon to be ex-husband. As a result, they can't pay for their hotel room, and everything else in Vegas is seemingly booked. They book the only room they can find, a seedy motel which is infested with bed bugs and a random assortment of mysterious liquids. Undeterred, they got to a male strip club but are kicked out because Claire swats a stripper's penis out of her face. They are then robbed of all their possessions, including Claire's engagement ring, by a fake drug dealer that Zoe tries to buy drugs from. To make money, they go to a mud wrestling party where Janet wins a $300 consolation prize after being knocked out by the reigning champion.

In the ambulance to the hospital with Janet, Zoe steals some drugs and the group is kicked out of the ambulance after fighting with the medic. In a lengthy montage they then embark on a series of fun adventures. They go clubbing, zip-lining down Fremont Street, swimming, and indoor skydiving. After, they play bachelorette party games / dares: they kiss a man with a mustache, trick people into showing their belly buttons, scare random people, find celebrity look alikes, get a piggyback ride from a stranger, high-five a man mistaken for a lady, tickle an old man, dance like chickens, put lipstick on a dude, start a flash mob, rub a bald man's head, give people doughnuts, steal a lock of chest hair, arm wrestle a stranger, ask for a strangers underwear, poke someone with curly hair, get a foot massage from a stranger, steal a bottle of booze, and steal a limo ride.

In the limo, they spot a valet who looks like the fake drug dealer who robbed them. They kidnap the valet, go to his house, shave one eyebrow, draw on his chest, and urinate on his face as revenge. However, they then find out the valet is not the man who robbed them, and they are chased off by the parents of the valet.

They end up at the wrong hotel, where a bachelor party sex orgy is happening. Two men they met at a previous party save them when Claire disrupts the party, but one of them drives off with Claire with seemingly bad intentions. Leslie, Janet, and Zoe chase after them but get into an accident and drive off before the police arrive. They catch up to Claire and the man at a hotel, and see them go into a room and begin having sex. They pound on the door until someone answers, but again have the wrong room and an angry, naked woman chases them out. They pull the fire alarm to find Claire, who tells them nothing happened and that she loves her fiance. The group ends ups staying with the two men who saved them.

In the morning, Claire's boyfriend calls, and clarifies the events of his own bachelor party in Vegas to Claire. Having never found her wedding ring, Leslie offers her own, as her marriage is ending and she does not need it anymore.

In the final recap, Leslie divorces her husband and opens a series of marijuana clinics. Zoe gets back together with her ex, but then breaks up with him again. Janet moves to Vegas to start a career in jello wrestling but never wins and Claire and Dave get married.

== Cast ==
- Desiree Hall as Claire
- Eddie Ritchard as Zoe
- Samantha Colburn as Leslie
- Crista Flanagan as Janet

== Critical reception ==
Review aggregator Rotten Tomatoes reports a 0% approval rating based on 15 reviews, with an average rating of 3.00/10. Metacritic reports a weighted average of 17 out of 100 based on 8 critics, indicating "overwhelming dislike".

Ignatiy Vishnevetsky of The A.V. Club called it "a joyless patience-tester so inept it doesn't even know how to cheat its own found-footage gimmick", further saying "the movie has more awkward dead space than jokes".
