= Peter Safran =

British and American producer and manager

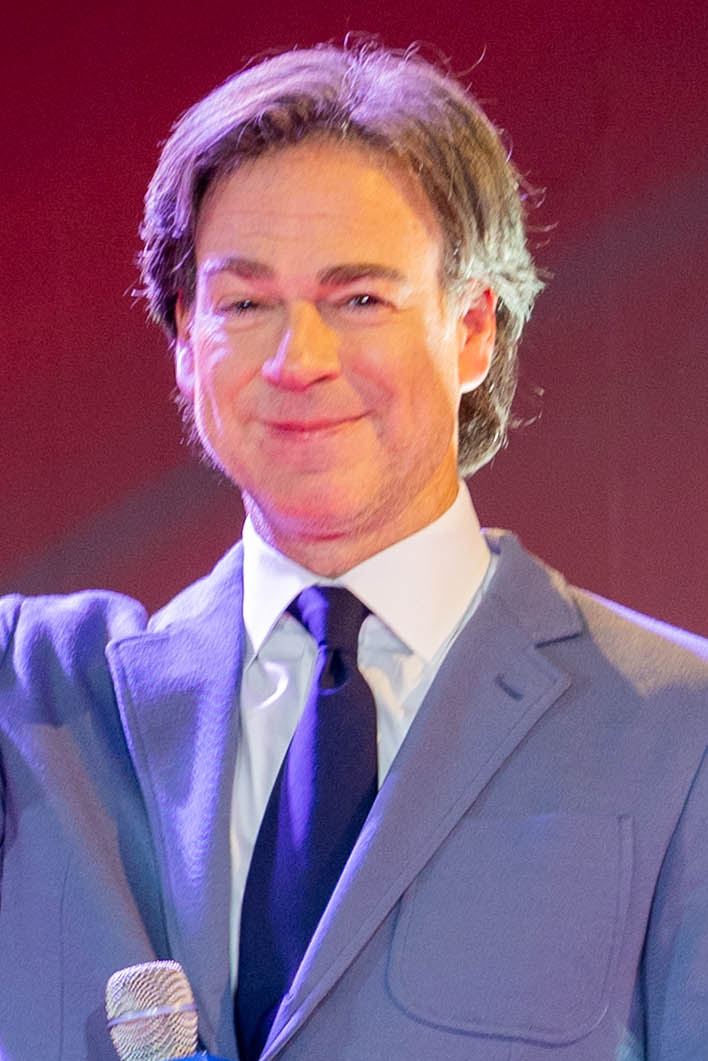
- Safran in 2025
- Born: 22 November 1965 (age 60); London, England
- Occupations: Film producer; studio executive; talent manager
- Years active: 1997–present
- Title: Co-chairman and co-CEO of DC Studios (2022–present)
- Spouse: Natalia Safran
- Children: 1 (Lou Lou)

Peter Safran (born 22 November 1965) is a British and American film producer, studio executive, and talent manager. He is the co-chairman and co-chief executive officer (CEO) of DC Studios with his longtime collaborator, filmmaker James Gunn, since October 2022, and the duo are scheduled to be succeeded by Jeremy Latcham in December 2026. They co-created and oversaw its flagship media franchise, the DC Universe (DCU), and produced many of the studio's films and television series. He has produced numerous franchise films for Warner Bros. Pictures, including The Conjuring film series (2013–2027), the DC Extended Universe (DCEU) films Aquaman (2018), Shazam! (2019), the Gunn-directed The Suicide Squad (2021), Shazam! Fury of the Gods, and Aquaman and the Lost Kingdom (both 2023), and the DCU films Superman (2025) and its follow-up Man of Tomorrow (2027), both also directed by Gunn, among others. He was also an executive producer on the DCU series Peacemaker (2022–2025), Creature Commandos (2024–present), and Lanterns (2026).

== Early life ==
Peter Safran is the son of Henry (died 2019) and Ordell Safran, both of Ashkenazi Jewish descent. After growing up in the UK, Safran graduated from Princeton University. He earned his J.D. degree at the New York University School of Law. He worked as a corporate attorney in New York City before becoming an assistant at United Talent Agency in Los Angeles.

== Career ==
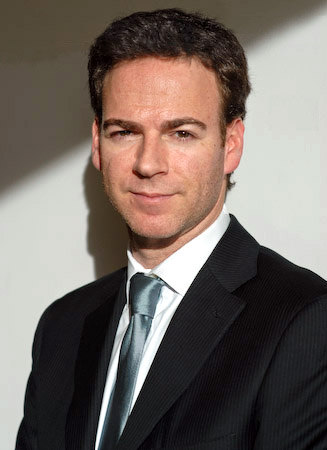
Safran in 2008

The logo of the Safran Company (2018–present), through which Safran has produced many of his films and television series.

Safran was the co-chairman and co-CEO of DC Studios with James Gunn, and is the co-creator of the DC Universe media franchise.

He became a talent manager at Gold-Miller Co and stayed there until 1998. He was a manager at Brillstein-Grey for five years before he was named president of Brillstein-Grey Management in 2003. As president, he was made responsible for day-to-day activities of the department, which had over 200 clients, including Brad Pitt, Jennifer Aniston, Adam Sandler, Nicolas Cage, and Courteney Cox. He left Brillstein-Grey in 2006, to launch The Safran Company, and took his entire client list with him. As manager, he represented Sean Combs, Adam Shankman, David Hyde Pierce, Jennifer Lopez, and Brooke Shields.

Safran was able to build on the success of The Conjuring Universe, going on to produce films such as Aquaman, Shazam!, The Suicide Squad, and Shazam! Fury of the Gods, as well as the television series Peacemaker, and others under his banner through his first-look deal with Warner Bros.

In October 2022, Safran and James Gunn were named co-chairs and co-CEOs of DC Studios, assuming their positions on 1 November of that year. Since then, they have overseen the division's film, television, and animation projects, with Gunn handling the creative side, and Safran handling the business side. They had previously collaborated on several projects, starting with the 2000 superhero comedy film The Specials, written by Gunn with Safran as co-executive producer, and including: Gunn's 2008 short films Sparky & Mikaela and Humanzee!; the television series James Gunn's PG Porn (2008–2009); The Belko Experiment (2016); and the DCEU film The Suicide Squad (2021). In their roles as co-heads of DC Studios, Safran and Gunn are involved in casting characters for the wider DC Universe (DCU) franchise, and Safran produces all films in the franchise. Safran and Gunn were initially set to continue in their roles at DC Studios after Warner Bros. Discovery and Paramount Skydance were merged into Skydance in October 2026. However, Skydance in November 2026 hired former Marvel Studios executive Jeremy Latcham as their successor, effective December 1. Safran will remain with DC as a producer.

== Filmography ==
=== Feature film ===
==== Producer ====
Miscellaneous films
Year	Title	Director
1997	RocketMan (Co-producer)	Stuart Gillard
2004	Jiminy Glick in Lalawood	Vadim Jean
2008	Meet the Spartans	Jason Friedberg and Aaron Seltzer
2008	Over Her Dead Body	Jeff Lowell
2008	Disaster Movie	Jason Friedberg and Aaron Seltzer
2009	New in Town	Jonas Elmer
2010	Vampires Suck	Jason Friedberg and Aaron Seltzer
2011	Flypaper	Rob Minkoff
2011	Elephant White	Prachya Pinkaew
2012	ATM	David Brooks
2012	True Love	Enrico Clerico Nasino
2013	Vehicle 19	Mukunda Michael Dewil
2013	Hours	Eric Heisserer
2013	Mindscape	Jorge Dorado
2013	The Starving Games	Jason Friedberg and Aaron Seltzer
2013	Best Night Ever	Jason Friedberg and Aaron Seltzer
2015	The Atticus Institute	Chris Sparling
2015	Superfast!	Jason Friedberg and Aaron Seltzer
2015	Summer Camp	Alberto Marini
2015	Martyrs	Kevin Goetz and Michael Goetz
2016	The Choice	Ross Katz
2016	The Belko Experiment	Greg McLean
2016	Mine	Fabio Guaglione
2016	The Worthy	Ali F. Mostafa
2017	The Crucifixion	Xavier Gens
2017	Flatliners	Niels Arden Oplev
2022	I Want You Back	Jason Orley
2025	Heads of State	Ilya Naishuller

Warner Bros. films
Year	Title	Director
2010	Buried	Rodrigo Cortés
2013	The Conjuring	James Wan
2014	Annabelle	John R. Leonetti
2016	The Conjuring 2	James Wan
2016	Wolves at the Door	John R. Leonetti
2016	Within	Phil Claydon
2017	Annabelle: Creation	David F. Sandberg
2018	The Nun	Corin Hardy
2018	Aquaman	James Wan
2019	Shazam!	David F. Sandberg
2019	Annabelle Comes Home	Gary Dauberman
2021	The Conjuring: The Devil Made Me Do It	Michael Chaves
2021	The Suicide Squad	James Gunn
2023	Shazam! Fury of the Gods	David F. Sandberg
2023	The Nun II	Michael Chaves
2023	Aquaman and the Lost Kingdom	James Wan
2025	Superman	James Gunn
2025	The Conjuring: Last Rites	Michael Chaves
2026	Supergirl	Craig Gillespie
2026	Clayface	James Watkins
2027	Man of Tomorrow †	James Gunn
2027	The Conjuring: First Communion †	Rodrigue Huart
2028	The Batman: Part II †	Matt Reeves

Key
†	Denotes films that have not yet been released

==== Executive producer ====
Year	Title	Director	Notes
1998	Senseless	Penelope Spheeris	Co-executive producer
2000	Scary Movie	Keenen Ivory Wayans	
2000	The Specials	Craig Mazin	Co-executive producer
2004	My Baby's Daddy	Cheryl Dunye	
2004	Connie and Carla	Michael Lembeck	
2005	The Long Weekend	Pat Holden	
2009	My Life in Ruins	Donald Petrie	
2015	Dark Places	Gilles Paquet-Brenner	
2019	Valley of the Gods	Lech Majewski	
2025	The Monkey	Osgood Perkins	

=== Short film ===
Year	Title	Director
2008	The Miracle of Phil	Andrew Douglas
2008	Doggie Heaven	James Wan
2008	Blue Like You	Lucky McKee
2008	Meat Dog: What's fer Dinner	David Slade
2008	Fairy Tale Police	Adam Green
2008	Sparky & Mikaela	James Gunn
2008	Humanzee!	James Gunn
2009	Post Apocalyptic Pizza	Peter Cornwell

=== Television ===
Year	Title	Notes
2003	Are You Comfortable?	TV movie
2006	Heist	4 episodes
2008–09	James Gunn's PG Porn	Web series
2022–25	Peacemaker	
2024	Beast Boy: Lone Wolf	Shorts series
2024–present	Creature Commandos	
2024–25	DC Metal Force	Web series
2025–present	Krypto Saves the Day!	Shorts series
2026	My Adventures with Superman	Season 3
2026	Lanterns	
2027	The People v. Gorilla Grodd †	

Key
†	Denotes television productions that have not yet been released
