= Crista Flanagan =

American actress

- Born: 1975 or 1976 (age 50–51); Mount Vernon, Illinois, U.S.
- Education: University of Evansville (BS); University of California, Irvine; (MFA)
- Occupations: Actress; comedian
- Years active: 2003–present

Crista Flanagan (born 1975 or 1976) is an American actress, best known for her work as a cast member on the Fox sketch comedy series MADtv from 2005 to 2009, various roles in films made by Jason Friedberg and Aaron Seltzer, and her recurring role as Lois Sadler on the AMC series Mad Men.

== Early life ==
Flanagan was born and raised in Mount Vernon, Illinois, the daughter of Bonnie Jerdon and David Flanagan. She graduated with a BS degree from the University of Evansville before earning an MFA from the University of California, Irvine. In 2003, she acted in the play Suburban Blight.

== Career ==
=== MADtv ===
Flanagan officially joined the cast of MADtv in 2005 as a featured performer, for the 10th season, then became a repertory cast member at the beginning of the following season. Her frequent impersonations were of Heidi Klum, Natalie Maines, and Miley Cyrus (as herself and as Hannah Montana from the Disney Channel series of the same name).

Crista had a long-standing gag with fellow cast member Bobby Lee, where their behind-the-scenes characters had a love/hate relationship. This relationship can be seen in the "Secret Santa" skit, where Bobby proposes to Crista, to which she replies, "I cannot marry someone I have a restraining order against." This can also be seen in the "Celebrity Triathlon" skit, where Crista slams the door after Bobby asks for her help, and she makes reference to not helping him dig up a dead body, but reluctantly agrees to help him train.

==== Characters ====
Character	Sketch	Season of first appearance	Catch phrase	Notes
Christie	"QVC: Quacker Factory"			
Denise	"Jazzed for Crafts"			
Luann Lockhart	"Luann Lockhart, Stand-up Comedian"	Season 10, 2005	"I recently broke up with my boyfriend, but that's okay because he hit me.! I went to a party and he said, 'Yuck, I thought I smelled you here.'" (to the audience) "Will you talk to me?'"	
Nippy	"Clownin' and Krumpin'"			
Sally	"Sesame Street"			
Peggy Partane	"Peggy Partane, the Rollerskating Champ"		"Dangit!"	
Wendy Walker	"Three-minute Meal"		"Just stop that ticking!" "Okay, let's get this three-minute meal going!" "Will you stop that clock while I look for my finger?!"	

=== Impressions ===
- Aaron Carter
- Gilbert Gottfried
- Heidi Klum
- Kate Moss
- Khloé Kardashian
- Lindsay Lohan
- Lo Bosworth
- Meredith Vieira
- Miley Cyrus
- Natalie Maines
- Scarlett Johansson
- Toni Basil
- Vanna White
- Whitney Port

=== After MADtv ===
After MADtv, Flanagan's most notable television role was the recurring role of Lois Sadler on the drama series Mad Men, on which she appeared for the first three seasons from 2007 to 2009. She has also appeared on Curb Your Enthusiasm, The Practice, and ER, and had a recurring role on You've Got a Friend. She partnered up with the team behind Ask a Ninja to create a video podcast called Hope is Emo. Flanagan played the role of Hermione Granger in the 2007 film, Epic Movie. She later appeared as Ugly Betty/Oracle in the "sequel" Meet the Spartans, and in Disaster Movie played Juney, a parody of Juno, and Hannah Montana/Miley Cyrus. She also appeared in Seltzer and Friedberg's 2010 project, Vampires Suck, as Eden Sullen. With the release of Best Night Ever in 2013, she became the most recurring actress in Jason Friedberg and Aaron Seltzer films. She posed nude in the August 2010 issue of Playboy. She appeared in an episode of Big Time Rush as an evil producer named Kennedy.

Flanagan plays the title character in Hope Is Emo, an Internet comedy podcast that satirizes the life of a struggling emo girl named Hope. The series was created by Crista and the Ask a Ninja' team at Beatbox Giant Productions.

Flanagan currently works as an acting teacher and coach, teaching specialized lessons in on-camera acting and scene-study techniques, drawing from her background in improvisational comedy and television.

== Filmography ==
=== Film ===
Year	Title	Role	Notes
2004	Outpost	Sonia	Video short
2007	Epic Movie	Hermione Granger	
2008	Meet the Spartans	Oracle / Ugly Betty Look-A-Like	
2008	Other Plans	Beth	Short film
2008	Disaster Movie	Juney / Hannah Montana	
2010	Vampires Suck	Eden	
2012	Buried Treasure	Waitress	Short film
2013	Happy and You Know It	Alexis	Short film
2013	Best Night Ever	Janet	
2018	Doubting Thomas	Lucy	

=== Television ===
Year	Title	Role	Notes
2003	ER	Pam	Episode: "Finders Keepers"
2003	The Practice	Marcia	Episode: "Les Is More"
2004	You've Got a Friend	Friend	3 episodes
2005	Curb Your Enthusiasm	Mrs. Seiderman's Nurse	Episode: "The Larry David Sandwich"
2005–2009, 2016	MADtv	Various	Series regular (82 episodes)
2007–2009	Mad Men	Lois Sadler	Recurring role (9 episodes)
2009	The New Adventures of Old Christine	Andrea	Episode: "Honey, I Ran Over the Kid"
2009–2010	Hank	Dawn	3 episodes
2010	Brothers & Sisters	Stacy Hodges	Episode: "The Pasadena Primary"
2010	Big Time Rush	Kennedy	Episode: "Big Time Live"
2011	Cougar Town	Destiny	Episode: "Damaged by Love"
2012	Beautiful People	Lisa	TV film
2013	Last Man Standing	Miss Clevenger	Episode: "The Fight"
2013	2 Broke Girls	Catherine	Episode: "And the Kitty Kitty Spank Spank"
2013	Key & Peele	Margot	Episode: "3.8"
2013	You're Whole	Donna	Episode: "Lemonade/Fishing/Cupcakes"
2013	Garden Apartments	Crista	TV film
2013	The Sticks	Rita	TV film
2013–2014	Hello Ladies	Marion	Recurring role (4 episodes)
2013–2014	Trophy Wife	Ms. Wickersham	2 episodes
2014	Mom	Beth	Episode: "Chicken Nuggets and a Triple Homicide"
2014	Hello Ladies: The Movie	Marion	TV film
2014	Dr. Brown	Gemma	TV film
2015	Marry Me	Libby Berman	2 episodes
2015	Grey's Anatomy	Andrea	Episode: "With or Without You"
2015	Workaholics	Woman's Studies Professor	Episode: "Dorm Daze"
2015	Clipped	Rhonda Doyle	Recurring role (8 episodes)
2015	Club 5150	Angela	4 episodes
2016	Love	Loud Nasal Girl	Episode: "The Date"
2016	The Grinder	Professor Danforth	Episode: "From the Ashes"
2017	Disjointed	Woman	Episode: "Olivia's S***balls"
2018	Grace and Frankie	Katie	Episode: "The Home"
2018	G.P.A.	Jen Holland	4 episodes
2018	The News Tank	Kirsten Flannery	5 episodes
2019	I'm Sorry	Michelle	Episode: "Little House in the Prairie"
2019	The Resident	Nurse Sharon Colby	Episode: "If Not Now, When ?"
2020	Dirty John	Dr. Katherine Difrancesca	Episode: "Perception is Reality"
