= Matt Lanter =

American actor (born 1983)

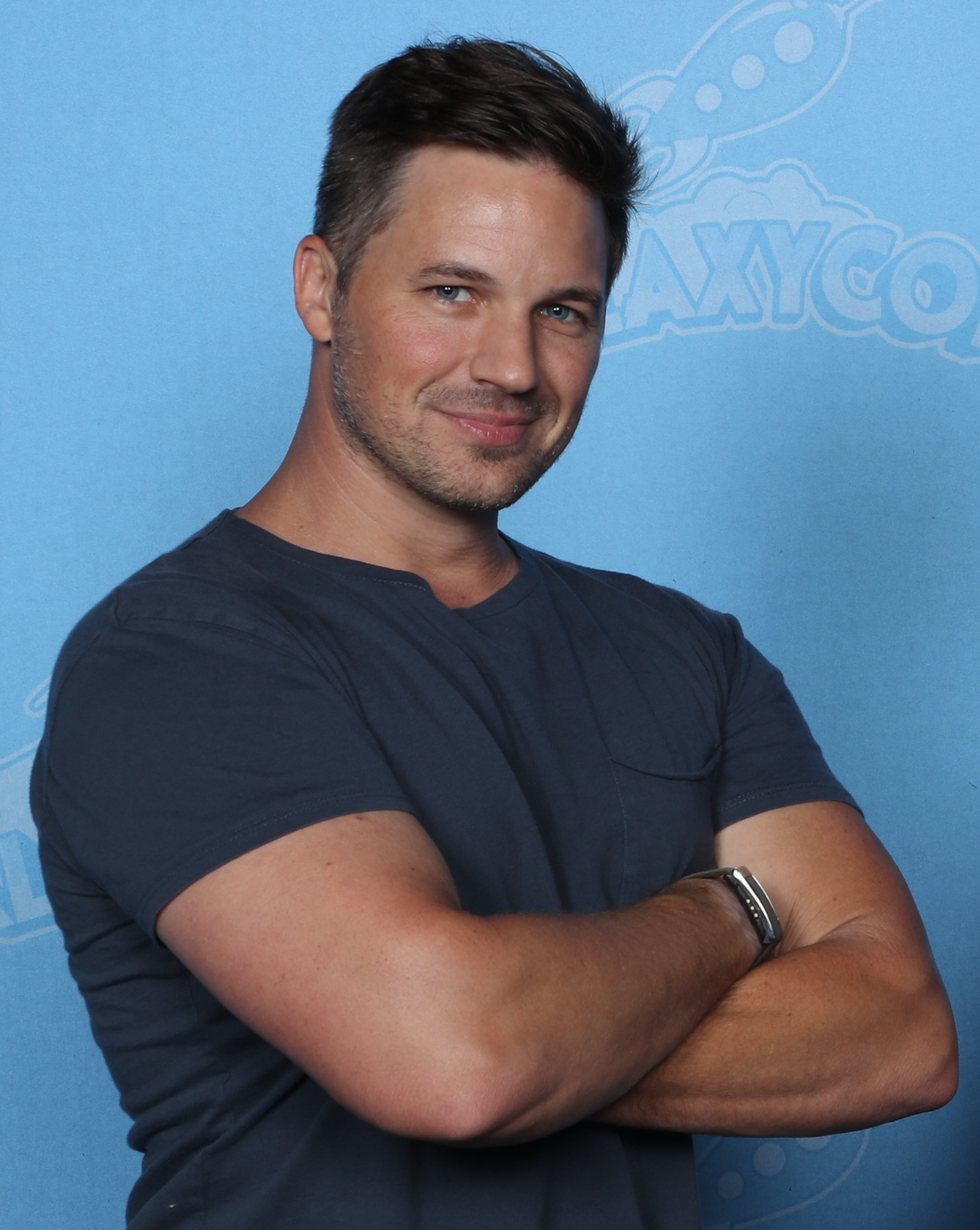
- Lanter in 2021
- Born: Matthew MacKendree Lanter; April 1, 1983 (age 43); Massillon, Ohio, U.S.
- Education: University of Georgia
- Occupation: Actor
- Years active: 2004–present
- Spouse: Angela Stacy (m. 2013)
- Children: 2

Matthew MacKendree Lanter (born April 1, 1983) is an American actor. He began his career in modeling in 2004, the same year he appeared in the film Bobby Jones: Stroke of Genius and the television series Point Pleasant. He gained fame for his role of Liam Court in 90210 (2009–2013). Lanter is also known for his extensive voice work in the Star Wars franchise, voicing Anakin Skywalker / Darth Vader in projects such as the animated film Star Wars: The Clone Wars (2008) and its subsequent television series, Star Wars Rebels, and other Star Wars media. From 2016 to 2018, he played a lead role as Wyatt Logan in the sci-fi television series Timeless. His works also include Jupiter's Legacy, Disaster Movie, Sorority Row, Vampires Suck, The Roommate, and Pitch Perfect 3. Beyond film and television, his voice work also includes roles in video games and narration for audiobooks.

== Early life ==
Lanter was born on April 1, 1983, in Massillon, Ohio. His father worked in insurance, and his mother was a school secretary. He has one older sister. When Lanter was eight, the family moved to Atlanta, Georgia. Lanter played baseball in his youth and was a batboy with the Atlanta Braves for two seasons. He majored in business at the University of Georgia.

== Career ==
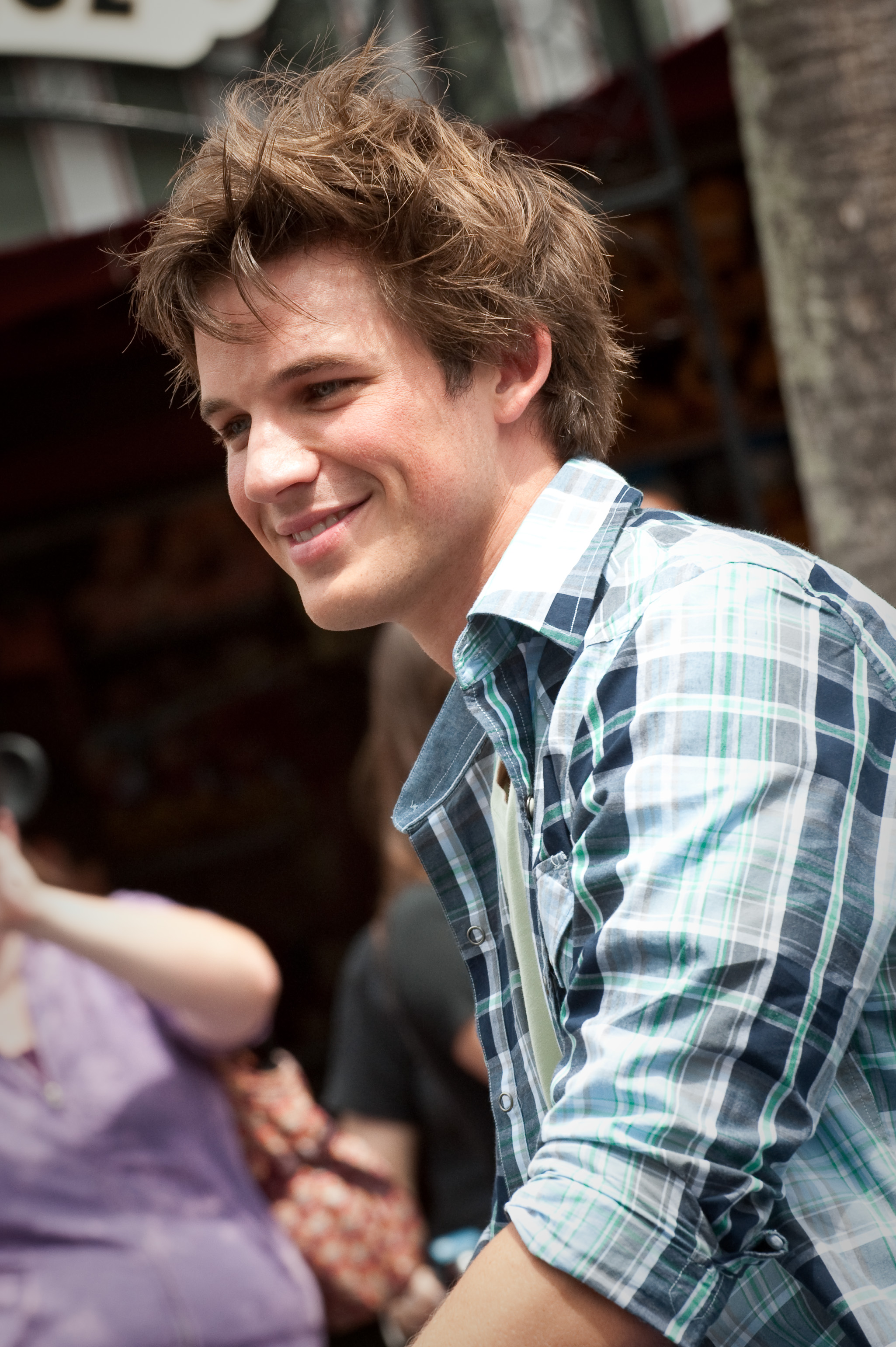
Lanter at the Star Wars Weekends in June 2009

In 2004, Lanter was a contestant on Bravo's reality show Manhunt: The Search for America's Most Gorgeous Male Model. He did not win the competition. In November of that year, Lanter appeared as a caddie in the biographical film Bobby Jones: Stroke of Genius. Between June and July 2005, Lanter appeared in three episodes of the Fox supernatural drama series Point Pleasant, playing the role of Nick. The show received low ratings and did not last a full season. He has since appeared in television shows such as Grey's Anatomy and Big Love. In April 2005, he signed on to become a series regular portraying the role of Horace Calloway on ABC's political drama series Commander in Chief. The series premiered in September 2005, ran for one season and was cancelled in June 2006.

In 2008, he took on the lead role as Zach Conroy in The Cutting Edge: Chasing the Dream, as a member of a figure skating pair. Later that year, Lanter starred in Disaster Movie as the character Will. The film later appeared on Empire's 2010 poll The 50 Worst Movies Ever, in which it scored number 14. Lanter appeared in the slasher film Sorority Row, which was released in September 2009. It received negative reviews from both critics and audiences.

In 2009, he began a major recurring role on the CW's 90210 portraying Liam Court and he joined the regular cast in season two. In March 2010, he signed on for another parody project with Jason Friedberg and Aaron Seltzer, 20th Century Fox's Vampires Suck. He played Edward Sullen, a spoof of Edward Cullen from the Twilight saga. The film was released in August 2010 and received negative reviews. In 2011, Lanter appeared in the psychological thriller The Roommate as Jason. Although it received unfavorable reviews from critics, it was a moderate success at box office in North America; however, it was overshadowed by that year's Super Bowl. In 2012, he worked on the films Liars All and A Chance of Rain. He also voices Harry Osborn, Flash Thompson and Venom in the TV series Ultimate Spider-Man, which premiered on April 1, 2012. He also voiced the role of Sled in Secret of the Wings, which was released later that year.

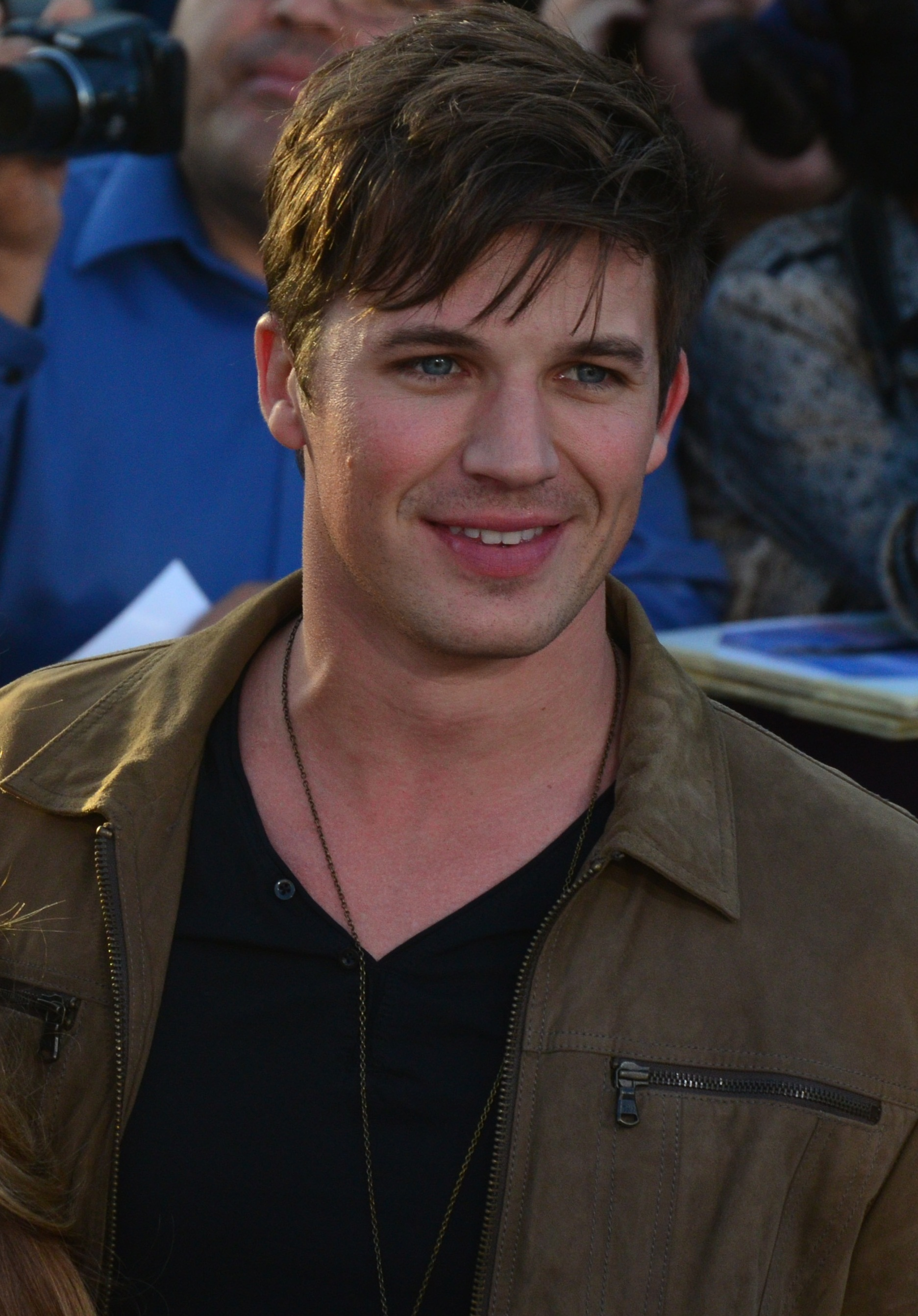
Matt Lanter at the film premiere of Divergent in California on March 18, 2014

In March 2013, Lanter was cast as a co-star in The CW's science fiction drama series Star-Crossed (originally titled Oxygen). Star-Crossed is about a romance between a human girl and an alien boy (Lanter) when he and six others of his kind are integrated into a suburban high school 10 years after they landed on Earth and were consigned to an internment camp. From 2016 to 2018, Lanter began playing the role of Wyatt Logan in the NBC series Timeless. In February 2019, it was announced that Lanter was cast as George Hutchence in the Netflix superhero series Jupiter's Legacy.

=== Star Wars ===
Lanter played Jedi Knight Anakin Skywalker in the 2008 animated film Star Wars: The Clone Wars and later all seven seasons of the TV series of the same name. He has stated that his fellow cast members and the other people who worked on the show are "like family" to him. He also portrayed the character in Star Wars Battlefront II and Star Wars Rebels. He has said that Hayden Christensen, the actor who had previously had the role in Episode II – Attack of the Clones and Episode III – Revenge of the Sith, had a "very, very difficult job" demonstrating the character's arc from hero to villain, and considers himself fortunate that he had more time to show the transformation.

Lanter had not known for whom he was auditioning when trying for the role. He was told he would be playing a character called "Deak Starkiller" who Dave Filoni, the director of the Star Wars: The Clone Wars animated film, suggested he portray as a mixture of Luke Skywalker and Han Solo. Lanter had minor roles in Episode VII: The Force Awakens (2015) as various alien scavengers and stormtroopers. On December 13, 2019, he appeared in The Mandalorian episode "Chapter 6: The Prisoner", portraying Lant Davan, a New Republic soldier. He returned to his role as the voice of Anakin Skywalker in the miniseries Tales of the Jedi, which became available on Disney+ on October 26, 2022.

== Personal life ==
Lanter married his longtime girlfriend Angela Stacy on June 14, 2013. The two had been in a relationship since 2009. They had a daughter in 2017 and a son in 2025. In March 2022, Lanter underwent emergency surgery for a closed-loop intestinal obstruction, which had given him "intense abdominal pain". He is a Christian.

== Filmography ==
=== Film ===
| Year | Title | Role | Notes | Ref. |
|---|---|---|---|---|
| 2004 | Bobby Jones: Stroke of Genius | Bobby Jones's caddy | | |
| 2008 | WarGames: The Dead Code | Will Farmer | | |
| 2008 | Star Wars: The Clone Wars | Anakin Skywalker (voice) | | |
| 2008 | Disaster Movie | Will Clayton | | |
| 2009 | Sorority Row | Kyle Tyson | | |
| 2010 | Vampires Suck | Edward Sullen | | |
| 2011 | The Roommate | Jason Tanner | | |
| 2012 | Secret of the Wings | Sled (voice) | | |
| 2013 | Liars All | Mike | | |
| 2015 | Justice League: Throne of Atlantis | Arthur Curry / Aquaman (voice) | | |
| 2015 | Star Wars: The Force Awakens | Additional voices | | |
| 2016 | USS Indianapolis: Men of Courage | Brian "Bama" Smithwick | | |
| 2017 | Pitch Perfect 3 | Chicago Walp | | |
| 2018 | The Death of Superman | Arthur Curry / Aquaman (voice) | | |
| 2020 | Justice League Dark: Apokolips War | Arthur Curry / Aquaman (voice) | | |
| 2020 | Chasing the Rain | Eric | | |
| 2021 | DC Showcase: Blue Beetle | Ted Kord / Blue Beetle (voice) | Short film | |
| 2024 | Justice League: Crisis on Infinite Earths | Ted Kord / Blue Beetle, Ultraman (voice) | | |

=== Television ===
| Year | Title | Role | Notes | Ref. |
|---|---|---|---|---|
| 2004 | Manhunt | Himself | Contestant | |
| 2005 | 8 Simple Rules | Brendon | Episode: "The After Party" | |
| 2005 | Point Pleasant | Nick | 3 episodes | |
| 2005–2006 | Commander in Chief | Horace Calloway | Main role | |
| 2006 | Big Love | Gibson | Episode: "Eviction" | |
| 2006 | Heroes | Brody Mitchum | Recurring role | |
| 2006 | Shark | Eddie Linden | 3 episodes | |
| 2007 | CSI: Crime Scene Investigation | Ryan Lansco | Episode: "Fallen Idols" | |
| 2007 | Monk | Clay Bridges | Episode: "Mr. Monk and the Birds and the Bees" | |
| 2007 | Grey's Anatomy | Adam Singer | Episode: "The Heart of the Matter" | |
| 2007 | Judy's Got a Gun | Isaac Prentice | Television film | |
| 2008 | The Cutting Edge: Chasing the Dream | Zack Conroy | Television film | |
| 2008 | Life | Patrick Bridger | Episode: "Everything... All the Time" | |
| 2008 | The Oaks | Mike | Episode: "Pilot" | |
| 2008–2014, 2020 | Star Wars: The Clone Wars | Anakin Skywalker, Okalin, Ratter (voice) | 95 episodes | |
| 2009–2013 | 90210 | Liam Court | Main role | |
| 2012 | Scooby-Doo! Mystery Incorporated | Baylor Hotner (voice) | 3 episodes | |
| 2012–2017 | Ultimate Spider-Man | Harry Osborn / Patrioteer, Flash Thompson / Agent Venom, Venom, Klaw, additional voices | 46 episodes | |
| 2014 | Star-Crossed | Roman | Main role | |
| 2015 | The Astronaut Wives Club | Ed White | 3 episodes | |
| 2015 | CSI: Cyber | Tristan Jenkins | Episode: "Corrupted Memory" | |
| 2016 | Star Wars Rebels | Anakin Skywalker (voice) | 2 episodes | |
| 2016–2018 | Timeless | Wyatt Logan | Main role | |
| 2017–2018 | Star Wars Forces of Destiny | Anakin Skywalker (voice) | 6 episodes | |
| 2019 | Avengers Assemble | Winter Soldier, Reporter (voice) | Episode: "Vibranium Curtain" | |
| 2019 | The Mandalorian | Lant Davan | Episode: "Chapter 6: The Prisoner" | |
| 2020 | Lego Star Wars Holiday Special | Anakin Skywalker, Rodian (voice) | | |
| 2021 | Jupiter's Legacy | George Hutchence | Main role | |
| 2022 | Lego Star Wars Summer Vacation | Anakin Skywalker, Rodian (voice) | | |
| 2022 | Tales of the Jedi | Anakin Skywalker (voice) | Episode: "Practice Makes Perfect" | |
| 2023 | S.W.A.T. | Aaron Skinner | Episode: "Blowback" | |
| 2024 | Star Wars: The Bad Batch | Olly, Stormtrooper #1 (voice) | Episode: "Point of No Return" | |
| 2025 | Motorheads | Darren | Recurring role | |

=== Video games ===
| Year | Title | Role | Notes | Ref. |
|---|---|---|---|---|
| 2008 | Star Wars: The Clone Wars – Lightsaber Duels | Anakin Skywalker | | |
| 2008 | Star Wars: The Clone Wars – Jedi Alliance | Anakin Skywalker | | |
| 2009 | Star Wars: The Clone Wars - Republic Heroes | Anakin Skywalker | | |
| 2011 | Lego Star Wars III: The Clone Wars | Anakin Skywalker | | |
| 2011 | Star Wars: The Old Republic | Darth Sadic | | |
| 2012 | Kinect Star Wars | Anakin Skywalker | | |
| 2014 | Disney Infinity 2.0 | Venom | | |
| 2015 | Disney Infinity 3.0 | Anakin Skywalker, Venom | | |
| 2016 | Lego Marvel's Avengers | Ulysses Klaue | | |
| 2017 | Star Wars Battlefront II | Anakin Skywalker | | |
| 2022 | Lego Star Wars: The Skywalker Saga | Anakin Skywalker | | |
| 2026 | Star Wars: Zero Company | Anakin Skywalker | | |
