= Tony Cox (actor) =

American actor

- Born: Joseph Anthony Cox; March 31, 1958 (age 68); Uniontown, Alabama, U.S.
- Occupation: Actor
- Years active: 1980–2016
- Height: 3 ft 6 in (107 cm)
- Spouse: Otelia Cox (m. 1981)
- Children: 1

Joseph Anthony Cox (born March 31, 1958) is a retired American actor best known for his roles in Bad Santa, Friday, Me, Myself & Irene, Date Movie, Epic Movie, Disaster Movie, and Leprechaun 2. He is also best known for his role in George Lucas's Willow, as an Ewok in Return of the Jedi, and as The Preacher in Tim Burton's Beetlejuice.

== Early life ==
Cox was born in New York City, the son of Henrietta Cox-Penn and Joe Cox. He spent his childhood in Uniontown, Alabama, with his grandmother and grandfather, Lottie and Henry Jones. His mother and stepfather, Rudolph (Rudy) Penn, live in College Park, Georgia. By the age of 10 he became an avid drummer. Cox attended Robert C. Hatch High School and graduated in 1976. He met his future wife, Otelia Cox, during high school. They were eventually married in 1981 when Cox was 23 years old.

After high school, Cox attended Alabama State University and originally planned to study music.

== Career ==
Cox decided to pursue acting after watching Billy Barty, a little person who was an actor and founder of the organization Little People of America. Encouraged by relatives and friends, he moved to Los Angeles at age 18.

He began taking classes at the Merrick Studio School of Acting with Scriptwriter De De Tillman and soon began working in commercials, film, and television roles. Cox appeared on the TV show Martin in the first season, playing the character Bennie, in which he helps his friend Trey, played by Bushwick Bill, beat up Tommy played by Thomas Mikal Ford, over Tommy allegedly "stealing" his ex-girlfriend. Cox also appeared in a pivotal role in the Farrelly Brothers' movie Me, Myself & Irene, playing a Mensa International-member limousine driver who steals Jim Carrey's character's wife.

He is best known for his roles in Bad Santa where he played Marcus, the brains of a safe cracking duo, and in Date Movie where he played a parody of Dr. Hitch from Hitch. Cox reprised his role as Marcus in Bad Santa 2, released in 2016.

Cox retired from acting following his appearance in Bad Santa 2, confirming in a 2023 interview that he decided to take time off following hip surgery before ultimately stepping away from acting altogether.

== Filmography ==
=== Film ===
Year	Title	Role	Notes
1980	Dr. Heckyl and Mr. Hype	William "Bad William"	
1981	Nice Dreams	Midget Nut	Credited as Joe Anthony Cox
1981	Smokey Bites the Dust	Desk Clerk	
1981	Under the Rainbow	Hotel Rainbow Guest	
1982	Penitentiary 2	Midget	Credited as Joe Anthony Cox
1982	Jekyll and Hyde...Together Again	Lawn Jockey #1	
1983	Return of the Jedi	Widdle "Willy" Warrick	
1986	Invaders from Mars	Drone	Credited as Joe Anthony Cox
1986	Captain EO	Hooter	Short
1986	Hollywood Zap!	Kong	
1987	Valet Girls	Sammy Rodenko	
1987	Spaceballs	Dink	
1987	Retribution	Hotel Resident	
1988	Beetlejuice	Minister	
1988	Willow	Nelwyn Warrior	
1988	I'm Gonna Git You Sucka	Wayne Evans	
1988	Rented Lips	Tyrell	
1988	Bird	Pee Wee Marquette	
1990	Spaced Invaders	Corporal Pez	
1990	Rockula	Al "Big Al"	
1991	Bill & Ted's Bogus Journey	Station	Uncredited
1991	The Dark Backward	Human Xylophone	
1992	Mom and Dad Save the World	Blaaatt	
1994	The Silence of the Hams	Dwarf Guard	
1994	Leprechaun 2	Black Leprechaun	
1994	Blankman	Midget Man	
1994	Ghoulies IV	Ghoulie Dark	Direct-to-video
1995	Friday	Mr. Parker	
1995	The Fantasticks	Bavarian Baby's Assistant	Credited as Joe Anthony Cox
2000	Me, Myself & Irene	Limo Driver	
2003	Bad Santa	Marcus Skidmore	
2003	The Hebrew Hammer	Jamal	
2005	Back By Midnight	Prison Guard Smitty	
2006	Date Movie	Hitch	
2006	National Lampoon's TV: The Movie	Stubbs	
2007	Epic Movie	Bink	
2007	Who's Your Caddy ?	Willie "Big Willie" Johnson	
2008	Disaster Movie	Indiana Jones	
2010	The Warrior's Way	Eight-Ball	
2010	Meet Monica Velour	Petting Zoo Club Owner	
2011	The Legend of Awesomest Maximus	Minorities	
2012	Partysaurus Rex	Chuck E. Duck	Short; Voice
2012	Guns, Girls and Gambling	Little Person Elvis	
2013	White T	Head Bouncer	
2013	Oz the Great and Powerful	Knuck / Sourpuss	
2015	Strange Magic	Plum Elf	Voice
2015	The Heyday of the Insensitive Bastards	Mr. Chubb	
2016	Bad Santa 2	Marcus Skidmore	

=== Television ===
Year	Title	Role	Notes
1981	Buck Rogers in the 25th Century	Private Zedth	Episode: "Shgoratchx!"
1982	The Greatest American Hero	Circus Dwarf	Episode: "Just Another Three-Ring Circus"
1984	Faerie Tale Theatre	Bubba / Herald	2 episodes
1984	Pryor's Place	Allen	Episode:"Voyage to the Planet of the Dumb"
1984	Caravan of Courage: An Ewok Adventure	Widdle "Willy" Warrick	Television film, also stunt performer
1985	Ewoks: The Battle for Endor	Widdle "Willy" Warrick	Television film
1985	ABC Weekend Special	Suit Performer	Episode: "The Adventures of Teddy Ruxpin"
1987	Thirtysomething	Dread	Episode: "Nice Work If You Can Get It"
1990	Married... with Children	Alien	Episode: "Married...With Aliens"
1992	In Living Color	Host	Episode: "Black People Award"
1993–1994	Martin	Mr. Johnson / Bennie	2 episodes
1996	Mad TV	Mr. White	Episode: "Season 2 Episode 6"
1997	Claude's Crib	Reenactment Shorty	Episode: "Hometown Hero"
1997	The Jamie Foxx Show	Sweet & Low	Episode: "Step Up to Get Down"
1999	Stark Raving Mad	Goldy	Episode: "Christmas Cheerleader"
1999–2000	Linc's	Himself	2 episodes
2002	Frasier	Angel #1	Episode:"The Proposal"
2004	Rescue Me	Arlo	3 episodes
2004	Method & Red	Circus Performer	Episode: "Neighborhood Watch"
2007	Carpoolers	Seth	Episode: "The Seminar"
2010	Psych	Himself	Episode: "The Polarizing Express"
2012	A Fairly Odd Christmas	Elmer The Elder Elf	Television film
2014	Almost Human	Di Carlo	Episode:"Beholder"

=== Video games ===
Year	Title	Role	Notes
1994	Loadstar: The Legend of Tully Bodine	Bartender #1	

=== Music videos ===
Year	Title	Role	Artist
1992	Over You	Circus Performer	Timmy T
1996	California Love	Dwarf Soldier	2Pac
2000	Breakout	Limo Driver	Foo Fighters
2002	From tha Chuuuch to da Palace	Midget Officer	Snoop Dogg
2002	Get Back	Midget Dancer	504 Boyz
2004	Just Lose It	Marcus Skidmore	Eminem
