= Vampires Suck =

2010 American vampire parody film

- Theatrical release poster
- Directed by: Jason Friedberg; Aaron Seltzer
- Written by: Jason Friedberg; Aaron Seltzer
- Produced by: Jason Friedberg; Aaron Seltzer; Peter Safran
- Starring: Matt Lanter; Chris Riggi; Ken Jeong
- Cinematography: Shawn Maurer
- Edited by: Peck Prior
- Music by: Christopher Lennertz
- Production companies: Regency Enterprises; 3 in the Box
- Distributed by: 20th Century Fox
- Release date: August 18, 2010
- Running time: 82 minutes
- Country: United States
- Language: English
- Budget: $20 million
- Box office: $81.4 million

Vampires Suck is a 2010 American vampire parody film written and directed by Jason Friedberg and Aaron Seltzer. Theatrically released by 20th Century Fox on August 18, 2010, it stars Jenn Proske, Matt Lanter, Christopher N. Riggi, Ken Jeong, Anneliese van der Pol, and Arielle Kebbel, and mainly parodies The Twilight Saga franchise (specifically the original film and its sequel, New Moon). Like the previous Friedberg and Seltzer movies, the film was panned by critics for its humor and plot, although a few did praise Proske's performance.

== Plot ==
Edward Sullen strips off his clothes during the St. Salvatore festival while Becca Crane rushes to stop him. While running through a fountain, she accidentally splashes water around, causing people to party in the fountain and thus stopping Becca. In a flashback, Becca relocates to the Pacific Northwestern town of Sporks to live with her clueless father Frank, the town's sheriff, after her mother, who raised her in Nevada, commences a romantic affair with Tiger Woods. Meanwhile, a killing spree is attributed to the Canadians, but the real perpetrators are a group of vampires usually mistaken for the Black Eyed Peas. Becca quickly befriends many students at her new high school, but is also intrigued by the mysterious and aloof Edward, whose odd behavior perplexes her during their biology class.

Later, when Becca is nearly struck by a van in the school parking lot, Edward stops the vehicle by thrusting another student in the van's way. After much research and thought, she confronts Edward and assumes he is one of the Jonas Brothers. Edward corrects her, saying he is a vampire but that he only consumes animal blood. Despite the danger of being around a vampire, Becca agrees to accompany Edward to the prom. Later, Becca and Edward kiss passionately in her room. Becca attempts to seduce Edward into having sex, but he abstains.

On Becca's birthday, Edward introduces her to his vampire family. While unwrapping one of her presents, Becca unintentionally suffers a paper cut. Edward's brother Jeremiah attempts to bite her, but is knocked away. To keep his family away from Becca, Edward distracts them and takes her out to the woods. He then proceeds to abrupty end their relationship, and she throws a tantrum after he leaves. Much to her expectance, Becca is attacked by three nomadic vampires, but Edward intervenes and saves her.

Becca is left heartbroken for months by Edward's departure, but she is comforted by her deepening friendship with her childhood friend Jacob White. When the nomadic vampires reencounter her in the woods, Jacob transforms into a Chihuahua as his werewolf pack arrives to save her. Meanwhile, Edward has moved to Rio de Janeiro and is now dating Lady Gaga to deal with losing Becca. His sister Iris, via her gift of prophecy, later incorrectly informs him that Becca killed herself. Edward becomes depressed and decides to provoke the "Zolturi", a powerful and narcissistic vampire coven, into killing him by exposing himself in the sunlight in front of humans, thus exposing the existence of vampires. Iris has another vision of Becca's survival as he leaves, but she is unable to warn him.

Arriving at Becca's house, Iris implores her to rescue Edward by revealing to him that she is still alive. To Becca's shock, the Zolturi are currently partying at the prom due to the St. Salvatore theme. Jacob appears and orders Becca to choose between him and Edward, but just before she announces her decision, he runs off to pursue a cat he noticed. Upon arriving at the prom, Becca is caught between the warring factions of Edward fangirls and Jacob fangirls. She is unable to reach Edward before he exposes himself, figuratively and literally. However, twilight occurs, followed by a new moon and an eclipse, concealing Edward's vampiric nature as Becca gets him to safety. Frank arrives to check on Becca, making her hopeful; however, he thinks supernatural creatures are the prom theme and leaves. After a fight between him and the Zolturi leader, Daro, Edward is forced to turn Becca into a vampire, at risk of being slaughtered. He agrees to do so only if she marries him, which she accepts.

Suddenly, the leader of Jacob's fangirls strikes Edward on the head, but he survives the blow; the girl is subsequently attacked by the newly vampirized Becca.

== Cast ==
- Jenn Proske as Becca Crane
- Matt Lanter as Edward Sullen
- Christopher N. Riggi as Jacob White
- Ken Jeong as Daro
- Anneliese van der Pol as Jennifer
- Diedrich Bader as Sheriff Frank Crane
- Arielle Kebbel as Rachel
- B. J. Britt as Antoine
- Charlie Weber as Jack
- Crista Flanagan as Eden
- Kelsey Ledgin (credited as Kelsey Ford) as Iris
- Jun Hee Lee as Derric
- David DeLuise as Fisherman Scully
- Ike Barinholtz as Bobby White (uncredited)
- Dave Foley as Principal Smith
- Randal Reeder as Biker Dude
- Nick Eversman as Jeremiah Sullen
- Zane Holtz as Alex
- Krystal Mayo as Buffy the Vampire Slayer

== Release ==
Vampires Suck was released on August 18, 2010, in the United States, Canada and Russia, on August 26 in Australia and on October 15 in the United Kingdom.

== Reception ==
=== Critical response ===
On Rotten Tomatoes, the film has an approval percentage of 4% based on 89 reviews, with the critics consensus reading: "Witlessly broad and utterly devoid of laughs, Vampires Suck represents a slight step forward for the Friedberg-Seltzer team." On Metacritic, the film has a score of 18 out of 100 based on 17 critic reviews, meaning "Overwhelming Dislike". Audiences polled by CinemaScore gave the film an average grade of "C+" on an A+ to F scale.

Spill.com, whose video reviews were usually around five minutes long and censored, had a twenty-second review which consisted of Korey Coleman staring blankly into the camera before uttering, "Fuck you" (which is the lowest rating the website gave) uncensored. In the audio commentary from the site, Coleman stated, "The films that these two directors make are so blatant at being nothing more than a juvenile finger pointing at an image or mention of a popular trend that, to me, they seem exploitive of a young culture raised to have an ever-decreasing attention span, thanks to the Internet and channel surfing, and this may sound a little crazy, but I think it shows a slight de-evolution in what people will accept as entertainment." Peter Travers of Rolling Stone gave the film zero out of four stars, and wrote a four word-long review, which simply stated: "This movie sucks more." Film critic Mark Kermode reviewed the film on his Radio 5 show, prefacing the review by saying "It's no surprise to know that it's all terrible, witless, boring, terror". He criticized the film for what he perceived as stale subject matter, saying that the Twilight franchise had left the public consciousness and was no-longer fit for parody, "It's not just that the ship has sailed; it's that the ship has sailed, gone across the Atlantic, hit an iceberg, sunk, been dragged up by at least one company, been turned into the biggest movie hit ever, and is now currently being retrofitted for 3D for an anniversary re-release."

Another review from Collider's Jake Horowitz said that "not a single thing in its dreadful 82 minutes running time is even remotely worth watching, or considered even slightly entertaining." He then wrote that "no amount of review can make up for what I witnessed while watching Vampires Suck. How wrong I was to assume that it was even watchable, because with each over-done hit on the head or kick in the balls I cringed at the thought of this movie making nearly $80 million worldwide; and imagining people actually laughing in a theatre somewhere."

Despite the overwhelming negativity, Jenn Proske's mimicry performance based on Kristen Stewart received some praise; Steve Persall of Tampa Bay Times stated, "One thing the movie roasts to perfection is Kristen Stewart's overly pensive Bella... A newcomer named Jenn Proske has the mumbling, hair-twisting, lip-biting tics down pat, and her expressions of repressed sexuality are almost as funny as Stewart's." Entertainment Weekly said, "The exception is newcomer Jenn Proske, who spoofs Twilight star Kristen Stewart's flustered, hair-tugging angst with hilarious precision."

Vampires Suck was given four nominations from the Golden Raspberry Awards, including Worst Picture, Worst Director, Worst Screenplay and Worst Prequel, Remake, Rip-Off or Sequel.

=== Box office ===
In the United States, the film opened at number one on August 18 with $4,016,858. On August 19, the film dropped to #3 behind The Expendables and Eat Pray Love with $2,347,044. By the weekend, Vampires Suck landed at #2 behind The Expendables and $200,000 over Eat Pray Love. The full second week the film dropped to #11, grossing no more than $500 per theater, respectively. In its second weekend, the film dropped more than 50% from its opening weekend but rose to #6. As of July 12, 2012, the film has grossed $80,547,866 worldwide.

== See also ==
- Vampire film
