= John Di Domenico =

American performer (1962-)

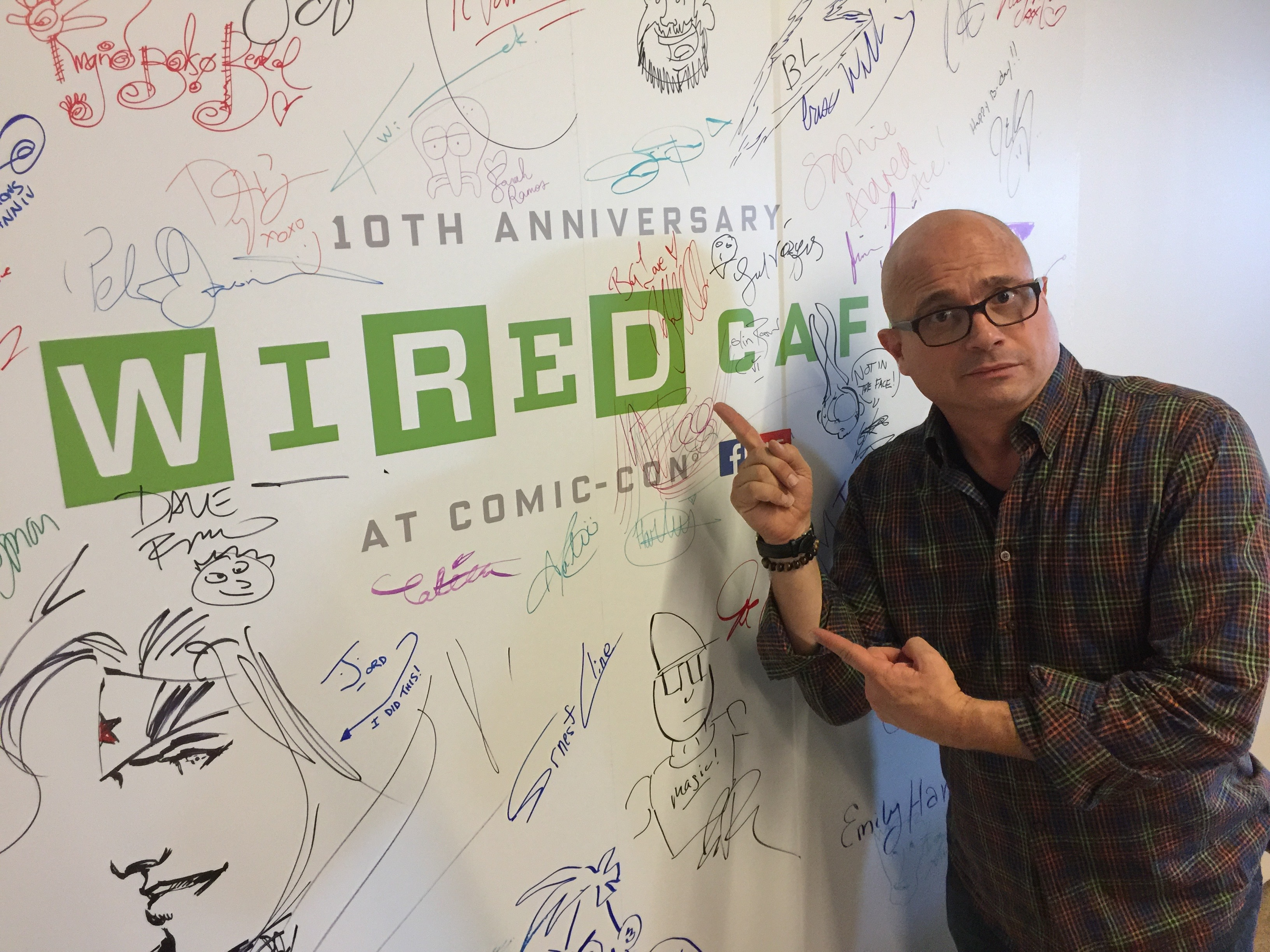
- Di Domenico in 2018
- Born: November 4, 1962 (age 64)
- Occupation: Actor
- Years active: 1980–present
- Website: thejohnnydshow.com

John Di Domenico (born November 4, 1962) is an American actor, comedian and writer, best known for his award-winning impersonation of Donald Trump. He has portrayed Donald Trump many times on television, movies and web series, which includes Meet the Spartans, Conan, Red Eye, You Got Trumped and others.

== Early life and education ==
Di Domenico was born in Ambler, Pennsylvania to John and Selena Di Domenico. When he was a teenager, he started performing with a community theatre group which worked out of the Ambler Theatre and Opera house. Di Domenico attended East Stroudsburg University in the Pocono Mountains of Pennsylvania, majoring in Speech Communications. He then transferred to Temple University in Philadelphia. After he graduated from Temple with a BA in Speech Communications Di Domenico joined a Philadelphia advertising agency as a copywriter.

== Career ==
He began his acting career in the late 1980s in Philadelphia. He first joined SKITZOID Comedy Troupe and started performing and touring nationally with the company. He became the head writer and artistic director. In September 1989 Di Domenico auditioned for and landed the role of Joey Vitale in the hit off-Broadway interactive improvisational show "Tony n' Tina's Wedding." While working in New York John became a member of Some Assembly Required, one of the city's finest improvisation companies.

Di Domenico has portrayed Donald Trump many times on Conan, Fox News Redeye and the Netflix original series Chelsea. Di Domenico won ABC's The View's "Best Donald Trump" competition. John's non-Trump appearances include the CBS series True Detective, "Labor Day" for PBS, and the hit HBO series, The Sopranos, where he played Howie Reinstein.

In 2016 during Trump's candidacy for President of the United States, Di Domenico's celebrity surged with media appearances and coverage with news media outlets worldwide all over the globe.

During his career, he has impersonated celebrities including Dr. Phil, Guy Fieri, Jay Leno and Mike Myers.

=== Trump Impersonation ===
He began his Donald Trump impression in 2004 when asked if he could do a voice-over of "The Donald" for The Apprentice type game. Di Domenico has closely studied Trump's vocal and physical changes over the years to adapt his own impersonation, spending for Donald Trump wigs and creating personalized make-up and wardrobe to capture the essence of Trump. He has appeared as Donald Trump on Fox & Friends (Fox News) in 2006 and has appeared multiple times since then. In January 2021, Di Domenico began acting in a YouTube webisode series, Orange Acres, where he and actress Mikalah Gordon portray Donald and Melania Trump as they navigate the post-Presidency life, searching for jobs and attempting to get out of crippling debt.

== Credits ==
=== Movies ===
Year	Movies	Role	Notes
1997	Mosquito Man	Larry Grabowski	Short
2005	Punisher: First Round	Johnny Pogioli	Short
2008	Meet the Spartans	Donald Trump	
2008	Disaster Movie	Dr. Phil-lookalike/The Love Guru	
2010	Collecting Things	Husband	Short
2012	Plurality	Director Allan Pollard	Short
2013	Not Another Celebrity Movie	Donald Trump	
2013	30 Nights of Paranormal Activity with the Devil Inside the Girl with the Dragon Tattoo	Ronald Crump	
2014	American Native	Donald Trump	Documentary
2019	Purge of Kingdoms	Lord Trumpet of Orange	
2020	Trump Card	Donald Trump	Voice
2020	Bunker Boy	Donald Trump	Short
2021	My Life Stopped At 15	John #1	Short
2025	President Zombie	Baby Trump	

=== Television ===
Year	Television	Role	Notes
2006	Fox & Friends	Donald Trump	Performer
2007	The Sopranos	Howie Reinstein	Episode: "Kennedy and Heidi"
2015	Who Is Donald Trump?	Donald Trump	Television documentary
2015-2017	Red Eye w/Tom Shillue	Donald Trump	Performer
2015-2018	Conan	Donald Trump	Performer, 49 episodes
2016	ABC News Nightline	Donald Trump	Performer
2016	You Got Trumped: The First 100 Days	Donald Trump	13 episodes
2016	President Trump: Can He Really Win?	Donald Trump	Television documentary
2017	The View	Donald Trump	Contestant
2017	Chelsea	Donald Trump	3 episodes
2019	Fake News: A Trump Story	Donald Trump	Television film, also scenarist and producer
2020	The Good Fight	Donald Trump	Episode: "The Gang Goes to War"
2020	The Freak Brothers	Donald Trump	Voice, episode: "Kentucky Fried Freaks"
2021	Let's Be Real	Donald Trump	Voice, episode :"Episode #1.3"

=== Web series ===
Year	Name	Role	Notes
2010-2011	The Crazyman Show	Donald Trump/Ozzie Osbourne	2 episodes
2016	Marino 2016	Donald Trump	3 episodes
2017	The New Movie Show	Donald Trump	Episode: "Snatched & King Arthur: Legend of the Sword"
2018	Funny or Die	Donald Trump	Episode: "Melania Trump Comedy Sketch"
2019	Randy Rainbow	Donald Trump	Episode: "The Donald Trump Cell Block Tango"
2020	Grandayy	Donald Trump	Episode : "Trump Speech: A Man Has Fallen Into the River of Lego City"
2021	Orange Acres	Donald Trump	13 episodes

== Awards ==
His appearance on ABC's The View helped him the win for "Best Trump" impersonation which made him a finalist in the L.A. Laugh Factory's International Trump Impersonation contest, for which he took top spot.
