= Epic Movie =

2007 American parody film

- Theatrical release poster
- Directed by: Jason Friedberg; Aaron Seltzer
- Written by: Jason Friedberg; Aaron Seltzer
- Produced by: Paul Schiff
- Starring: Kal Penn; Adam Campbell; Jennifer Coolidge; Jayma Mays; Faune A. Chambers; Crispin Glover; Tony Cox; Hector Jimenez; Fred Willard
- Cinematography: Shawn Maurer
- Edited by: Peck Prior
- Music by: Edward Shearmur
- Production company: Regency Enterprises
- Distributed by: 20th Century Fox (Note: Uncredited on the main film and all promotional material.)
- Release date: January 26, 2007
- Running time: 85 minutes
- Country: United States
- Language: English
- Budget: $20 million
- Box office: $86.9 million

Epic Movie is a 2007 American parody film written and directed by Jason Friedberg and Aaron Seltzer, and starring Kal Penn, Adam Campbell, Jayma Mays, Jennifer Coolidge, Faune A. Chambers, Crispin Glover, Tony Cox, and Fred Willard. A parody of the epic film genre, the film references The Chronicles of Narnia: The Lion, the Witch and the Wardrobe, The Da Vinci Code, Harry Potter, Charlie and the Chocolate Factory, Pirates of the Caribbean, X-Men, Nacho Libre, and Harold & Kumar Go to White Castle, the latter of which also starred Penn.

Epic Movie was released by 20th Century Fox on January 26, 2007 and received overwhelmingly negative reviews from critics, with many deeming it as one of the worst films ever made. Despite this, it grossed $86.9 million against a $20 million budget.

== Plot ==
Lucy finds that her adoptive father, a museum curator, has been attacked by Silas. Before dying, he gives clues that lead her to a "Golden Ticket" in a vending machine candy bar. Fellow orphans Edward, a disillusioned monk trainee; Susan, a displaced adopted girl; and Peter, a mutant at Mutant Academy who is often teased for his chicken-like wings, all find Golden Tickets. All four meet up at Willy's Chocolate Factory. Willy reveals his plot to use them all as a special ingredient in his treats.

Attempting to hide from the maniacal Willy, Lucy finds a wardrobe. On the other side, in the middle of a wintry forest, she finds Mr. Tumnus, who welcomes Lucy to Gnarnia and warns her of danger. The others follow Lucy to Gnarnia, and Edward meets the White Bitch. She convinces him to trap the other orphans in order to become the king of Gnarnia in her White Castle.

All four go to Tumnus' house, where they discover their relation to each other in a copy of the famous painting The Last Supper, and that the White Bitch killed their parents. They ally themselves with Harry Beaver, Tumnus' life partner, to defeat the White Bitch.

Edward sneaks off to the White Bitch's castle. When he refuses to reveal to her where the others are, she flashes him her breasts, hypnotizing him into giving up the information on the orphans, then imprisons him. The White Bitch sends Silas after the trio; Tumnus apparently sacrifices himself to ensure their safety.

Afterwards, the orphans meet a graying Harry Potter, along with a balding Ron Weasley and a pregnant Hermione Granger at Hogwarts. They all help Lucy, Susan, and Peter train for the war against the White Bitch, accidentally killing Albus Dumbledore, Minerva McGonagall and Rubeus Hagrid in the process.

Captain Jack Swallows helps Edward escape, only for Edward to find out it was a ruse as Jack, the Bitch's old enemy, needs intelligence out of Edward.

Upon finishing their training, Lucy, Susan, and Peter head to the camp of Aslo, the rightful ruler of Gnarnia. Aslo agrees to help Edward and kills Silas in a duel, but while breaking Edward out, he is slain by the White Bitch. As the orphans have a pre-battle party with their allies, Susan gets drunk and vomits everywhere, disgusting their army enough that nobody shows up to help the orphans the next day. The four siblings engage the White Bitch in battle and all (except for Peter) are killed. Peter then finds a magic remote and uses its powers to revive his siblings.

Together, they kill the army, defeat the White Bitch, and stop her plan. Peter declares the White Bitch will receive a fair and just trial in the new Gnarnia, but Jack, struggling to balance on a runaway water wheel, accidentally crushes her to death. The four are crowned the new rulers of the land. Tumnus then shows up, having survived his battle. Decades later, the four now-elderly rulers find the wardrobe again and go through it. They appear moments after they had left, young again. They meet Borat, who congratulates them on a happy ending, but then, Jack's water wheel accidentally runs over the quartet, greatly injuring them. Borat then says his iconic "NOT!" as he turns around, claps his buttocks, and starts dancing before the credits roll.

== Cast ==
Actor/Actress	Role	Parody of	Movie/TV
Kal Penn	Edward Pervertski	Edmund Pevensie / Juan Pablo / Kumar Patel / Augustus Gloop	The Chronicles of Narnia / Nacho Libre / Harold and Kumar Go to White Castle / Charlie and the Chocolate Factory
Adam Campbell	Peter Pervertski / Super Peter	Peter Pevensie / Angel / Superman / Charlie Bucket	The Chronicles of Narnia / X-Men / Superman Returns / Charlie and the Chocolate Factory
Faune A. Chambers	Susan Pervertski	Susan Pevensie / Veruca Salt	The Chronicles of Narnia / Snakes on a Plane / Charlie and the Chocolate Factory
Jayma Mays	Lucy Pervertski	Lucy Pevensie / Sophie Neveu / Violet Beauregard	The Chronicles of Narnia / The Da Vinci Code / Charlie and the Chocolate Factory
Jennifer Coolidge	The White Bitch of Gnarnia	White Witch / Davy Jones	The Chronicles of Narnia / Pirates of the Caribbean
Tony Cox	Bink	Ginarrbrik	The Chronicles of Narnia
Hector Jimenez	Mr. Tumnus / Tony Fauntana	Mr Tumnus / Tony Montana	The Chronicles of Narnia / Scarface / MTV Cribs
Jareb Dauplaise	Ignacio / Nacho	Nacho Libre	Nacho Libre
Crispin Glover	Willy	Willy Wonka	Charlie and the Chocolate Factory
Darrell Hammond	Captain Jack Swallows	Jack Sparrow / Captain Morgan	Pirates of the Caribbean / Captain Morgan
Carmen Electra	Mystique	Mystique	X-Men
Jim Piddock	Magneto	Magneto	X-Men
Kevin Hart (uncredited)	Silas	Silas	The Da Vinci Code
Fred Willard	Aslo	Aslan	The Chronicles of Narnia
David Carradine	The Curator	Jacques Saunière	The Da Vinci Code
Katt Williams	Harry Beaver	Mr. Beaver	The Chronicles of Narnia and Bell Canada reference in scene with PDA
Danny Jacobs	Borat Sagdiyev	Borat Sagdiyev	Borat
Nick Steele	Lead Archer		The Chronicles of Narnia
Gregory Jbara	Mel Gibson		
David Lehre	Ashton Kutcher	Ashton Kutcher	Punk'd
Kevin McDonald	Harry Potter	Harry Potter	Harry Potter series
George Alvarez	Ron Weasley	Ron Weasley	Harry Potter series
Crista Flanagan	Hermione Granger	Hermione Granger	Harry Potter series
Alla Petrou	Paris Hilton		
James Walker, Sr.	Samuel "God Damn" / "Motherfuckin'" Jackson	Samuel L. Jackson / Agent Neville Flynn	Snakes on a Plane
Abe Spigner	Flavor Flav	Flavor Flav	Flavor of Love
Lauren Conrad	Herself		The Hills
Vince Vieluf	Wolverine	Wolverine	X-Men series
Lindsey Kraft	Rogue	Rogue	X-Men
Scott L. Schwartz	Hagrid	Hagrid	Harry Potter series
Roscoe Lee Browne	Narrator		
Tad Hilgenbrink	Cyclops	Cyclops	X-Men
Audra Lynn	Wardrobe Girl		
Anwar Burton	Michael Jackson	V	V for Vendetta
Darko Belgrade	James Bond	James Bond	James Bond series
Dane Farwell	Albus Dumbledore	Albus Dumbledore	Harry Potter series
Kahshanna Evans	Storm	Storm	X-Men trilogy
Rico Rodriguez	Chanchito	Chancho	Nacho Libre
Heather Storm	Aslo's girl		
Shawn McDonald	P. Daddy Faun	Puff Daddy	
Lichelle D. Ebner	Morphed Mystique		X-Men

== Parodies ==
=== Films and TV shows ===
- The Chronicles of Narnia: The Lion, the Witch and the Wardrobe (2005) (main parody)
- The Da Vinci Code (2006)
- Nacho Libre (2006)
- Charlie and the Chocolate Factory (2005)
- Snakes on a Plane (2006)
- X-Men: The Last Stand (2006)
- Harry Potter and the Goblet of Fire (2005)
- Borat (2006)
- Rocky III (1982)
- Scarface (1983)
- Pirates of the Caribbean: Dead Man's Chest (2006)
- Superman Returns (2006)
- The Fast and the Furious: Tokyo Drift (2006)
- Click (2006)
- MTV Cribs (2000–2006)
- Harold & Kumar Go to White Castle (2004)
- Punk'd (2003–2007)
- Chappelle's Show (2003)
- Saturday Night Live (2005) – "Lazy Sunday" song by The Lonely Island
- The Lord of the Rings (2001)
- Talladega Nights: The Ballad of Ricky Bobby (2006)
- Mission: Impossible III (2006)
- Casino Royale (2006)
- V for Vendetta (2005)

=== Celebrities ===
- Mel Gibson
- Michael Jackson
- Lindsay Lohan
- Brad Pitt and Angelina Jolie
- Kanye West
- Ashton Kutcher
- Flavor Flav
- Samuel L. Jackson
- Paris Hilton
- Puff Daddy
- 50 Cent

== Release ==
=== Home media ===
Epic Movie was released on DVD on May 22, 2007, in both unrated and theatrical versions, by 20th Century Fox Home Entertainment. As of late 2009, 1,040,120 DVDs were sold, bringing in $16,807,388.

== Reception ==
=== Box office ===
Epic Movie debuted at number one at the box office with a gross of $18.6 million over the opening weekend. As of May 8, 2007, the film has grossed $86,865,564, with $39,739,367 of that amount earned domestically. The film was an economic success for its producers not least because it had a comparatively low budget, estimated at $20 million (the same as Date Movie).

=== Critical response ===
On Rotten Tomatoes, the film has an approval percentage of 2% based on 65 reviews and an average rating of 2.90/10, with the critics consensus reading: "A crude comedy with nothing new or insightful to say about the subjects it satirizes." On Metacritic, the film has a score of 17 out of 100 based on 17 critic reviews, meaning "Overwhelming Dislike". Audiences polled by CinemaScore gave the film an average grade of "C−" on an A+ to F scale.

A. O. Scott of The New York Times called the film "irreverent and also appreciative, dragging its satiric prey down to the lowest pop-cultural denominator" and added, "The humor is coarse and occasionally funny. The archly bombastic score . . . is the only thing you might call witty. But happily, Jennifer Coolidge and Fred Willard show up ... to add some easy, demented class." Mick LaSalle of the San Francisco Chronicle thought "only a complete idiot could think Epic Movie is remotely funny or worth making at all." Describing it as "so bereft of anything resembling wit or inspiration", he wondered, "What were the perpetrators, uh, filmmakers, thinking?" In the Los Angeles Times, Alex Chun called the film "nothing more than a disjointed series of scenes and references cobbled together as a backdrop for sophomoric humor." Ronnie Scheib of Variety said it was "epically unfunny" and "unlikely to join the list of blockbusters it lampoons." The Radio Times said "There's very little that's epic about this senseless parody, but then there's very little that's funny about it, either... It's mind-numbingly, tediously unamusing and is so devoid of imagination it even parodies self-mocking films." The Chicago Reader described the film as being "the cinematic equivalent of a tapeworm", while in his review for The Guardian, John Patterson wrote that "Epic Movie is an epic catastrophe, or an artistic failure of epic proportions, or even an Emetic Piece of Insufferable Crap". The Times expressed surprise that "Penn would stoop so low".

=== Accolades ===
Epic Movie was nominated for three Golden Raspberry Awards at the 28th ceremony: Worst Remake or Rip-off, Worst Supporting Actress (Carmen Electra), and Worst Screenplay (Jason Friedberg and Aaron Seltzer).

== See also ==
- List of 21st century films considered the worst
- Lists of parody films
