= Cuckoo (2009 film) =

- Theatrical release poster
- Directed by: Richard Bracewell
- Written by: Richard Bracewell
- Produced by: Tony Bracewell; Richard Bracewell
- Starring: Richard E. Grant; Laura Fraser; Tamsin Greig; Antonia Bernath; Adam F
- Cinematography: Mark Partridge
- Edited by: Craig Cotterill
- Music by: Andrew Hewitt
- Production company: Punk Cinema
- Distributed by: Verve Pictures
- Release dates: 25 September 2009 (Cambridge Film Festival); 17 December 2010
- Running time: 89 minutes
- Country: United Kingdom
- Language: English

Cuckoo is a 2009 British thriller film starring Laura Fraser, Richard E. Grant, Tamsin Greig, Antonia Bernath and Adam F, set in London, UK. It was created, written, and directed by Richard Bracewell and produced by Richard and Tony Bracewell. The film was cast by Dan Hubbard of the Hubbard casting family and scored by Bafta-nominated composer Andrew Hewitt.

Cuckoo is described as a "thriller about sounds and lies". The film tells the story of student Polly (Laura Fraser) who begins to think she is going mad as she starts to hear unexplained sounds.

== Cast ==
- Richard E. Grant as Professor Julius Greengrass
- Laura Fraser as Polly
- Antonia Bernath as Jimi
- Adam F as Chapman
- Tamsin Greig as Simon
- Richard Brake as Lone Wolf

== Production ==
Cuckoo was shot on location in December 2007 and January 2008 in London and Norwich, and in a studio built in a disused grain warehouse in Yarmouth. Filming locations included Berwick Street and Wardour Street in Soho in London.

== Release ==
The premiere of Cuckoo was premiered in September 2009 at the Cambridge Film Festival, where Clive James called the film "masterly and thrilling". Other UK film festival screenings followed at the last Filmstock festival in Luton, attended by Shere Hite who called Cuckoo "gripping from beginning to end", and at Glasgow Film Festival in February 2010, after which Scottish arts magazine The Skinny wrote that the film was "as tangible a representation of a troubled mind as you are likely to encounter on film".

Cuckoo was released in UK cinemas on 17 December 2010 by Verve Pictures and on DVD, Blu-ray and iTunes in the UK by Verve Pictures on 28 February 2011. The discs contained an audio commentary and theatrical trailer as extras.

== Reception ==
Cuckoo divided UK film critics sharply. As of June 2020, the film holds a 10% approval rating on Rotten Tomatoes, based on ten reviews with an average rating of 3.4 out of 10. Tim Robey of The Daily Telegraph wrote "After a debut as impressive as The Gigolos, writer-director Richard Bracewell concocts a dismayingly daft script for this shoestring psychological thriller". David Jenkins in Time Out commented that the film was "not particularly exciting or original, especially as it's never made quite clear what all the fuss is about". Andrew Lowry in Total Film called it "well-intentioned but fairly undramatic".

In a four-star Daily Mirror review, David Edwards wrote that the film was "an unsettling, unconventional ... quite unlike anything our film industry is pumping out these days", adding that "Fraser is superb as a woman who just might be on the verge of a nervous breakdown". In a four-star Den of Geek review, Doralba Picerno wrote that Cuckoo was "a little gem of a movie ... which will keep you engrossed for its duration and get you to do a lot of thinking about it afterwards. This is independent British cinema at its best, a thought-provoking feature where there are no clear demarcations of either guilt or reality and the atmosphere is rarefied and eerie."
