= Papa (2018 film) =

- Promotional poster
- Directed by: Dan Israelyo; Emilio Roso
- Written by: Dan Israely
- Produced by: Dan Israely; Zahava Israely; Emilio Roso
- Starring: Robert Scott Wilson; Paul Sorvino; Daryl Hannah; Mischa Barton; Frankie Avalon; Ann-Margret; Michael Madsen; Eric Roberts; David Proval
- Cinematography: Sonny Brown, James Zsigmond
- Edited by: Ninef Sargis
- Music by: Mark Daniel Dunnett
- Release date: June 15, 2018 (Laemmle Monica Film Center)
- Country: United States
- Language: English

Papa is a 2018 American drama film directed by Dan Israely and Emilio Roso, and starring Robert Scott Wilson, Paul Sorvino, Daryl Hannah, Mischa Barton, Frankie Avalon, Ann-Margret, Michael Madsen and Eric Roberts. Filming took place in Bakersfield, California and Los Angeles in 2015.

== Plot summary ==
Ben Freidman, a man raised by wealthy adoptive Jewish parents in Beverly Hills, decides that he is ready to meet his biological ones. He faces disappointment upon learning of the death of his biological mother. Meanwhile, his biological father resides in a psychiatric care unit.

== Cast ==
- Robert Scott Wilson as Ben Freidman
- David Proval as David Dresner
- Paul Sorvino as Danny
- Daryl Hannah as Sarah Freidman
- Frankie Avalon as Jack Freidman
- Mischa Barton as Jennifer
- Ann-Margret as Barbara
- Vincent Pastore as Frankie Vincent
- Eric Roberts as Dr. Eric Owens
- Michael Madsen as Ivan
- Rachel Reilly as Tiffany
- Dar Zuzovsky as Sheila
- Rene Michelle Aranda as Robin

Several of the cast members have worked together on previous film projects. Daryl Hannah, Paul Sorvino and Eric Roberts all appear in Sicilian Vampire (2015). Hannah and Michael Madsen previously appeared alongside each other for their roles in Kill Bill: Vol. 1 (2003) and Kill Bill: Vol. 2 (2004). Papa also marks the third screen appearance that Mischa Barton and Eric Roberts have made together. They previously appeared together in Starcrossed (2014) and L.A. Slasher (2015).
