= Trevor Sather =

British film-writer and actor (born 1973)

Trevor Sather (born 3 December 1973) is a British film-writer and actor.

Along with Sacha Tarter, Sather co-wrote and co-starred in the 2006 British movie The Gigolos, directed by Richard Bracewell. Sather played the 'gent' to Tarter's 'player' in the movie about a fantasy world of London gigolos and their clients. The movie also starred Susannah York, Anna Massey, Siân Phillips, and British actor and singer Basil Moss.

Sather was educated at St Paul's School and St John's College, Cambridge. Sather represented England at the World Schools Debating Championships in 1991 and 1992, and was selected for the English-Speaking Union (ESU) Debate Tour of the United States in 1995.

Sather worked for the ESU in the late-1990s as the head of its Centre for International Debate and Communication Training in London. He was the editor of the 18th edition of the ESU's debate publication, Pros and Cons: A Debater's Handbook, published in 1999. Sather is also a former vice-chairperson of the World Schools Debating Council Executive Committee, and a former Convenor and Chief Adjudicator of the World Schools Debating Championships.
