= Undercover (2015 TV series) =

- Genre: Drama; Comedy
- Created by: Andy Milligan; Sacha Alexander
- Starring: Daniel Rigby; Sarah Alexander; Yasmine Akram; Sacha Alexander; Ivan Kaye; Ryan Sampson
- Country of origin: United Kingdom
- Original language: English
- No. of series: 1
- No. of episodes: 6

Production
- Executive producers: Henry Normal; Margery Bone
- Editor: William Bone
- Running time: 40 minutes (incl. adverts)
- Production companies: Bonafide Films; Baby Cow Productions

Original release
- Network: Dave
- Release: 16 June – 21 July 2015

Undercover is a British television comedy drama series about a bumbling cop working undercover in an Armenian crime family.
