= Sacha Alexander =

British actor, scriptwriter and producer (born 1972)

- Born: 8 May 1972 (age 54); London, England

Sacha Alexander (born 8 May 1972) is a British actor, scriptwriter and producer.

Alexander most recently starred in Freddi with Rob Brydon. Freddi is a pilot comedy drama commissioned by BBC Four in 2008 about Freddi, a wealthy, bored Russian oligarch living in London. Alexander devised the show and wrote it with scriptwriter Mark Staheli, and produced with Brydon's production company Arbie. Freddi was scheduled for TV broadcast in 2009.

== The Gigolos ==
With Trevor Sather, Alexander co-wrote and co-starred in the 2006 British movie The Gigolos, directed by Richard Bracewell. Sather played the 'gent' to Alexander's 'player' in the movie about a fantasy world of London gigolos and their clients. The movie also starred Susannah York, Anna Massey, Siân Phillips, and British actor and singer Basil Moss.

The Gigolos premiered in the international feature competition at AFI Fest in Hollywood and was released in UK cinemas in 2007 and on DVD by the BFI on 9 February 2009. The UK network premiere of the film was on BBC One on 20 July 2009.

Larushka Ivan-Zadeh in Metro described Alexander as "one to watch". and told readers to "seek out this cliché-confounding, utterly intriguing debut Brit flick", adding that The Gigolos is a "real rough gem". Variety's Derek Elley described the film as an "accomplished debut" and a "likable Brit character comedy".

Alexander is credited as Sacha Tarter in the film.

Extras on the DVD include The Big Idea, a previously unreleased mockumentary about the business world made by Alexander, Sather and Bracewell.
