= The Beautiful Life =

American teen drama television series (2009)

- Genre: Teen drama
- Created by: Adam Giaudrone
- Starring: Mischa Barton; Sara Paxton; Ben Hollingsworth; Corbin Bleu; Nico Tortorella; Ashley Madekwe; Elle Macpherson
- Opening theme: "Samurai Showdown" by Shane Newville
- Composers: Marc Dauer; Evan Frankfort
- Country of origin: United States
- Original language: English
- No. of seasons: 1
- No. of episodes: 6 (4 unaired)

Production
- Executive producers: Ashton Kutcher; Jason Goldberg; Karey Burke; Mike Kelley
- Production location: New York City
- Running time: 42 minutes
- Production companies: Katalyst; The Page Fright Company; Mike Kelley Productions; Warner Bros. Television; CBS Productions

Original release
- Network: The CW
- Release: September 16 – December 18, 2009

The Beautiful Life (also known as The Beautiful Life: TBL) is an American teen drama television series, which ran on The CW from September 16 to September 23, 2009. The series starred Mischa Barton, Elle Macpherson, Sara Paxton, and Corbin Bleu. It revolved around a group of male and female models sharing a residence in New York City. Mike Kelley served as the showrunner for the series, based on the script by former model-turned-writer Adam Giaudrone, and Ashton Kutcher was the executive producer. The CW ordered 13 episodes for the first season.

On September 25, 2009, The Beautiful Life was canceled after two episodes due to low ratings. This was the first network television cancellation of the 2009–10 television season. Six full episodes were produced, while the cancellation came during the filming of the seventh episode. Due to scheduling conflicts for some of the planned guest stars, some filming had also taken place for other planned episodes. On November 17, 2009, The New York Daily News reported that The CW planned to air the remaining completed episodes during the summer months. However, a CW spokesperson stated that "the status of unaired episodes has yet to be determined." The episodes remain unaired.

The first five (of six reportedly produced) episodes were streamed on YouTube, with Kutcher stating, in December 2009, "What we feel like we're doing is creating, in some ways, an industry first.... A show that couldn't find its legs on television, we believe can find its legs on the Web." The five episodes, when they first streamed, had been sponsored by HP.

== Cast and characters ==
=== Main cast ===
- Mischa Barton as Sonja Stone – A supermodel, who has returned to the fashion scene after a mysterious disappearance for the (secret) birth of her daughter
- Sara Paxton as Raina Marinelli – An aspiring model, who instantly rises to fame
- Ben Hollingsworth as Chris Andrews – A newly appointed model, who is new to the fashion world.
- Corbin Bleu as Isaac Taylor – A once child model who aspires to a career as a DJ.
- Nico Tortorella as Cole Shepherd – A rising underwear model
- Ashley Madekwe as Marissa Delfina – A socialite and backstabbing model
- Elle Macpherson as Claudia Foster – The owner of Covet Models and a mother figure to the models

=== Recurring ===
Jaime Murray played a powerful wardrobe stylist, announced as a recurring character who would be eyeing Isaac. Ed Quinn would have played Claudia's husband, and Gal Gadot was cast to play Olivia, a Gisele Bündchen-type supermodel, but neither got the chance after the show's sudden cancellation. Billy Magnussen appeared as Alex, brother to Raina, in what was intended to be a multiple-episode arc.

=== Guest stars ===
The first episode shows the models at a Zac Posen runway show at New York Fashion Week, where Posen guest stars. Marie Claire fashion director and Project Runway judge Nina Garcia had a small cameo in the second episode. Designers Matthew Williamson and Erin Fetherston were also set guest star alongside model Jessica Stam. Model Irina Lazareanu made an appearance in the pilot as did So You Think You Can Dance Canada season 1 winner, Nico Archambault and model Boyd Holbrook. Claire Unabia and Mila Bouzinova from Cycle 10 and Cycle 9 of America's Next Top Model respectively made a special appearance at the Nina Garcia's party in episode 2. Magician David Copperfield was set to make a cameo appearance in episode 8 performing various illusions including sawing Sonja Stone in half, and had already filmed his scenes with Mischa Barton when the show was cancelled.

== Production notes ==
The show was largely filmed on location in New York City. Studio interiors were filmed at Kaufman Astoria Studios in Queens, New York.

In order to give the show an authentic look and feel, the show's producers negotiated a number of product placement deals and other agreements with various designers and fashion houses. This allowed the costume department to secure the loan of a wide range of genuine designer outfits and accessories for the cast to wear.

Prior to the start of production, as part of her preparations for the role of Sonja Stone, Mischa Barton had her ears pierced for the very first time. This was required in order to comply with one of the product placement deals that the producers of the show had negotiated with various high-end fashion designers. One of the terms of this deal was that Barton's character would wear the designer's earrings and, as most of the earrings were made for pierced ears, Barton had to have her ears pierced especially in order to wear them.

Due to scheduling conflicts with his tour to Australia, magician David Copperfield filmed his cameo scenes for episode 8 in July 2009, before any other filming for the episode had begun. The "Sawing In Half" illusion that he performed on Mischa Barton was a new boxless version of the illusion which has never been performed publicly, although stills of the scene showing Barton apparently divided in two without any boxes covering her did subsequently appear in a popular magic magazine.

== Promotion ==
The Beautiful Life was heavily promoted through the cast's and producer's Twitter accounts with promotional photos of Sara Paxton, Corbin Bleu, and Ashley Madekwe appearing semi-naked with the tag line "What are you looking at?". The Beautiful Life was promoted during New York Fashion Week and through New York magazine. In a targeted mailing, 4,000 high profile contacts in the fashion and media worlds got a polybagged edition of New York magazine featuring those semi-naked shots of the cast and then, during Fashion Week, copies of New York featuring an ad spread and the naughty nudes were handed out in the show tents. The show also received some unplanned publicity due to Mischa Barton's medical issues in the weeks leading up to the start of production.

== Ratings and cancellation ==
The series premiere did poorly with 1.38 million viewers, and a 0.6/2 in Adults 18–49, 0.8/2 in Adults 18–34, and 1.1/3 in Women 18–34. The second episode also drew in low numbers, with a 0.6/2 rating with adults 18–49, with only 1.1 million viewers. The show was officially cancelled on September 25, 2009 due to the poor reception.

== Reception ==
On Metacritic the series received a score of 40 out of 100 based on reviews from 13 critics, indicating "mixed or average review". Glenn Garvin of The Miami Herald gave the series a positive review, noting that Paxton and Hollingsworth's characters were "so unexpectedly affecting that you may find yourself sucked into the show against your will." Paige Wiser of the Chicago Sun-Times also positively reviewed the series, stating "most of the characters are about as distinctive as mannequins. You won't mind, though, because they're awfully nice to look at." Wiser complimented Barton's character, stating through her it may achieve "inadvertent poignancy." Robert Lloyd of The Los Angeles Times noted how the show was very similar to most The CW dramas, commenting "because they do not aim particularly high, they pretty much hit what they aim at." David Hinckley of The New York Daily News echoed the same thoughts, stating that the show "is designed to fit alongside CW anchors like 90210, except that even by those standards, it's pretty predictable and stilted." Brian Lowry of Variety said "the cast and writing are efficient enough, but nothing really pops."

Robert Bianco of USA Today gave the series a mixed review, stating "It may lack Melrose Place's flashy production values and trashy pedigree, but it makes up for that by being marginally better written, though admittedly, we're not talking about a particularly high bar here." Bianco went on to criticize the acting of the cast, calling them "unimpressive", stating "what's dispiriting about Beautiful Life is that it's too lazy to even work as successful eye candy." Bianco also criticized Mischa Barton, calling her "inept" in her role, stating that "she was stilted at best on The O.C., and instead of improving as an actress, she's merely solidified bad habits." Matthew Gilbert of Boston Globe called the pilot "half-baked", further stating, "Whether that's due to Barton or deeper creative problems is unclear." Tim Goodman of the San Francisco Chronicle called the show "unwatchable", noting its "pointless gloss and heinous writing." Linda Stasi of The New York Post said that only 12-year-olds could believe the show, calling the actors "unbelieveable" [sic], commenting "they can't even get the runway stomp right." Stasi also negatively commented on the dialogue of the show. Calling the plot "laughable" and the acting "mediocre", Jonathan Storm of The Philadelphia Inquirer said the show featured the "usual cynical CW glorification of teen sexuality and substance abuse."

== International airings ==
The show was originally announced as being part of the Autumn schedule of Ireland's TV3. The show was later moved to TV3's second station, 3e.

Network Ten in Australia and the United Kingdom's Channel 4 had the rights to air the show, but both networks refused to carry it after The CW's cancellation announcement.

== Episodes ==
No.	Title	Directed by	Written by	Original release date	U.S. viewers / Online views (millions)
1	"Pilot"	Christian Duguay	Adam Giaudrone	September 16, 2009; Released online December 15, 2009	1.38; Views online: 0.94
Raina Marinelli is a stunning beauty with a secret past. She makes an unforgettable impression while strutting down the runway in a Zac Posen gown during New York Fashion Week, and effectively steals the spotlight away from fellow model Sonja Stone. Sonja has been out of the country for mysterious reasons. She is now desperate to convince her agent, Claudia Foster, that she can reclaim her status as the reigning supermodel. Deemed the new "it" girl, Raina soon meets Chris Andrews, a strikingly handsome Iowa farm boy just entering the modeling world. Raina takes him to the "models' residence" where she lives along with other young hopefuls, including Marissa Delfina, Isaac Taylor and the current alpha-male model known as Cole Shepherd.
2	"The Beautiful Aftermath"	Michael Lehmann	Anna Fricke & Mike Kelley	September 23, 2009; Released online December 15, 2009	1.04; Views online: 0.69
Chris believes his chances at a modeling career are over and prepares to leave New York City until he receives a surprise phone call from Claudia. Claudia informs Raina that she needs to focus more on her career and less on her new relationship with Chris. Isaac confronts Vivienne about her behavior towards him at a go-see, and the two end up working out an arrangement that serves both their needs. Marissa accuses Sonja of stealing the Versace campaign from her and decides to seek revenge in a very public way, which leads Sonja to Cole for assistance. Marissa invites Raina's brother, Alex to a party hosted by Nina Garcia, where more secrets about Raina's past are revealed.
3	"The Beautiful Lie"	Sanford Bookstaver	Dailyn Rodriguez	Never aired on television Released online December 16, 2009	Views online: 0.78
Raina has an unpleasant meeting with her brutal ex-con father whom she finally gets the nerve to stand up to. Meanwhile, Sonja must face the consequences when a revealing photo of her goes public, while she continues to ask Cole to keep the existence of her newborn baby daughter a secret from the public. Also, Chris tries to help Raina and her brother Alex when Russian mobsters give a lot of trouble for Alex over his past business.
4	"The Beautiful Triangle"	Michael Fields	Lisa Henthorn & Jonathon Roessler	Never aired on television Released online December 18, 2009	Views online: 0.64
Raina and Cole's stars begin to skyrocket as they begin work on the Calvin Klein ad. Chris, on the other hand will find his initial success at the Details shoot fade, as he explores the less glamorous side of the industry from the outside looking in. Sonja books a major campaign that comes with strings attached. Marissa embarks on a business relationship with Alex while Isaac realizes his relationship with Vivienne is more complicated than he imagined when he meets an aspiring young model.
5	"The Beautiful Campaign"	Norman Buckley	Adam Giaudrone	Never aired on television Released online December 18, 2009	Views online: 0.83
The unveiling of the Calvin Klein billboard in Times Square and the interest from W Magazine starts to take a toll on Raina as she continues to struggle with her feelings for Cole. Problems arise in Claudia's marriage with Richard while Sonja's working on the campaign. Marissa steals a one of a kind pair of shoes from Max Azaria when she doesn't get booked for the Herve Leger show.

=== Episodes online ===
YouTube's logo for the series

On December 17, 2009, executive producer Ashton Kutcher reported on The Beautiful Life's official YouTube channel that because of the cancellation, the remaining four episodes would be carried online, with a hope that additional episodes could be produced if viewer demand was high enough. Only five of the six produced episodes were released on the program's YouTube channel on December 21, 2009, under a sponsorship deal with Hewlett-Packard. The effort did not lead to new episodes being produced and the sixth episode has never been released. As of October 2018, the channel still exists, but the episodes no longer stream. The channel originally included additional footage and cast member interviews, some discussing plotlines they hoped would be executed in possible future episodes.
