= Kisna: The Warrior Poet =

- Theatrical release poster
- Directed by: Subhash Ghai
- Written by: Subhash Ghai (Dialogue)
- Screenplay by: Subhash Ghai; Sachin Bhowmick; Farrukh Dhondy
- Story by: Subhash Ghai
- Produced by: Subhash Ghai
- Starring: Vivek Oberoi; Antonia Bernath; Isha Sharvani; Amrish Puri; Zarina Wahab
- Cinematography: Ashok Mehta
- Edited by: Subhash Ghai
- Music by: Songs: A. R. Rahman; Ismail Darbar; Background Score: A. R. Rahman
- Production company: Mukta Arts Pvt.Ltd
- Distributed by: Mukta Arts Pvt.Ltd
- Release date: 21 January 2005
- Running time: 171 minutes
- Country: India
- Languages: Hindi; English
- Budget: ₹ 250 million

Kisna: The Warrior Poet is a 2005 Indian Hindi-language period romance film written, edited, produced and directed by Subhash Ghai and starring Vivek Oberoi (who plays the title role), Antonia Bernath, and Isha Sharvani. The musical film is set in British India during the tumultuous 1940s when Indian nationalists fighting for the country's independence rose as one, urging the British Raj to leave. It is a love story about two people who are torn between love and duty. The film has two veteran composers, A. R. Rahman and Ismail Darbar; the lyrics were written by Javed Akhtar. The film marked Amrish Puri's last appearance as he had not signed or acted in any film after it before dying on 12 January 2005. The film, however, did not perform well at the box office. The film was premiered in the Marché du Film section of the 2005 Cannes Film Festival.

== Plot ==
Lady Catherine Williams (née Beckett), a wealthy British woman and former British minister, arrives in India to donate Rs 3500 Crores to charity as part of India's Republic Day celebrations. Before she can hand over the money, she requests a visit to Devprayag, where India's 2 rivers, Bhagirathi and Alaknanda, meet to form the Ganges River. At Devprayag, Lady Catherine remembers her childhood and narrates her story to a small crowd, which include two journalists – Rita and Jimmy.

Catherine was born in India in 1930, to British parents – Jennifer Beckett, who used to serve as a teacher to local children and Peter Beckett, who used to serve as the Deputy commissioner of Pauri Garhwal in British India. She had a privileged and peaceful upbringing. In 1935, a young Catherine befriends Kisna Singh, a local village boy and son of Peter's trusted servant Shriram Singh and Shanta Devi, and the two share a joyous friendship. Upon learning of this, Peter forcefully sends her back to England.

In May 1947, during the Independence Struggle, Catherine comes back to India on holiday and again meets Kisna, now a poet, school teacher and getting trained to be a warrior. Their childhood friendship is rekindled, and over time the feelings slowly develop into love. Their relationship is tested by the fact that they seemingly belong to opposite sides of India's struggle for freedom. Kisna also reveals that he is engaged to be married to Lakshmi, granddaughter of his music teacher and his one-sided but a crazy and possessive lover since childhood who always felt insecure of his friendship with Catherine.

There is growing resentment against colonialism, and Catherine finds herself targeted by an enraged mob of Indian nationalists after Peter is killed and Jennifer is presumed dead. She is protected by Kisna, who faces backlash from his maternal uncle Bhairo Singh and elder brother Shankar and community, who were part of the mob. Kisna is torn between his friendship and love for Catherine, his duty to his country, and the hatred of the British Raj. Supported by his mother Shanta, Kisna takes it upon himself to escort Catherine to the British High Commission, where safe passage back to England can be arranged for her.

The trip reaffirms their love for each other and tested by several trials including their hideout at his friend Nandu's home, their bond with Nandu's wife Rukmini, Jennifer being revealed alive, getting mobbed by rioters on the base of religion due to Partition of India and Kisna being forced to kill a corrupt Bhairo and the local prince Raghuraj Singh (who despite being friend with Peter was obsessed with Catherine and tried to rape her after she denied his proposal and advances when Peter was alive and also when her and Jennifer were caught by him during their escape with Kisna) to protect Catherine, but he is ultimately forced to choose between his feelings for Catherine and his duty to his newly independence gained country. He chooses the latter, and the pair bids an emotional farewell to each other.

In the present, it is revealed that Kisna married Lakshmi and fulfilled his duties to his wife and country, but always loved Catherine till his death. His last wish was for his ashes to be spread at Devprayag, the place where first love blossomed between him and Catherine. Catherine's last wish is also for her ashes to be spread at Devprayag so that, even though they both married different people, she and Kisna can be together forever.

== Cast ==
- Vivek Oberoi as Kisna Singh
  - Karan Desai as young Kisna
- Isha Sharvani as Lakshmi Devi (Hindi voice dubbed by Mona Ghosh Shetty)
  - Manjiri Bhate as young Lakshmi
  - Daksha Seth as old Lakshmi
- Antonia Bernath as Catherine Beckett
  - Anna Llewellyn as young Catherine
  - Polly Adams as old Catherine Williams
- Amrish Puri as Bhairo Singh
- Om Puri as Juman Masum Kishti (Special Appearance)
- Yashpal Sharma as Shankar Singh
  - Manav Tiwari as young Shankar
- Sushmita Sen as Naima Begum
- Zarina Wahab as Shanta Devi
- Shivaji Satam as Shriram Singh
- Rajat Kapoor as Prince Raghuraj Singh
- Michael Maloney as Peter Beckett
- Caroline Langrishe as Jennifer Beckett
- Vikram Gokhale as Dada Guru: Kisna's music teacher and grandfather-in-law; Lakshmi's maternal grandfather
- Mehul Thakur as Vasu: Lakshmi's cousin
  - Yash Pawar as young Vasu
- Jeetu Verma as Phunkara
- Hrishitaa Bhatt as Rukmini (Special Appearance)
- Ronit Roy as Jimmy (Special Appearance)
- Ashwini Kalsekar as Rita (Special Appearance)
- Rahul Singh as Biru
- Vivek Mushran as Nandu (Special Appearance)
- Vivek Shauq as Salaam Bhai
- Sudhir Mittu as Karan Singh: Kisna's younger son
- Asha Sharma as Bhagwati
- Mithilesh Chaturvedi as Vishnu Prasad
- P. D. Verma as Kisna's grandfather
- Sunita Shirole as Kisna's grandmother
- Nawab Khan as Roger

== Production ==
The film was shot on sync sound under the direction of Dilip Subramaniam at Ranikhet on a budget of ₹250 million ($5.48 million). Award-winning cinematographer Ashok Mehta, action director Tinu Verma, choreographer Saroj Khan, and production designer/art director Samir Chanda round out the crew.

Kisna: The Warrior Poet has two versions. A two-hour English version for the international market while the Hindi version will be a regular three-hour feature film with songs and dances.

== Soundtrack ==
Kisna: The Warrior Poet

Soundtrack album by A. R. Rahman, Ismail Darbar
- Released: 2 January 2005 (India)
- Recorded: 2004
- Genre: Feature film soundtrack
- Length: 1:09:59
- Label: Tips Music
- Producers: A. R. Rahman; Ismail Darbar

A. R. Rahman chronology
Netaji Subhas Chandra Bose: The Forgotten Hero (2004)	Kisna: The Warrior Poet (2005)	Mangal Pandey: The Rising (2005)

Ismail Darbar chronology
Baaz: A Bird in Danger (2003)	Kisna: The Warrior Poet (2005)	Husn (2006)

Subhash Ghai combined the musical talent of A. R. Rahman and Ismail Darbar to create the soundtrack. Ghai roped in his usual associate Rahman originally, but had to sign in Ismail Darbar to complete the project as Rahman was busy with the works of The Lord of the Rings. Ghai says: "Rahman was my original choice because it is an international project and I wanted both the festive and soulful element of Indian music. Then I asked Ismail to do the rest because apart from Rahman he has the knowledge and ability to fuse Western and Indian classical music. The way he has used Ustad Rashid Khan's voice in "Kahe Ujare Mori Neend" is really captivating."

Rahman returned to do the background score of the movie, on Ghai's request. The soundtrack got excellent reviews and was immensely praised. The lyrics were penned by Javed Akhtar. One English song "My Wish Comes True", was written by Blaaze. According to the Indian trade website Box Office India, with around 12,00,000 units sold, this film's soundtrack album was the year's twelfth highest-selling.

#	Song	Artist(s)	Composer
1.	"Hum Hai Iss Pal Yahan"	Udit Narayan, Madhushree	A. R. Rahman
2.	"Woh Kisna Hai"	Sukhwinder Singh, S. P. Sailaja & Ayesha Darbar	Ismail Darbar
3.	"Tu Itni Pagli Kyun Hai"	Alka Yagnik, Udit Narayan	Ismail Darbar
4.	"Chilman Uthegi Nahin"	Alka Yagnik, Hariharan (singer), Ayesha Darbar, S. P. Sailaja, Kailash Kher & Rakesh Pandit	Ismail Darbar
5.	"Wohi Din Aa Gaya"	Alka Yagnik, Sukhwinder Singh	Ismail Darbar
6.	"Tu Aisi Dhun Main Ga"	Kailash Kher, Ayesha Darbar, Ismail Darbar, S. P. Sailaja & Mohammed Salamat	Ismail Darbar
7.	"Tore Bin Mohe Chain Nahi"	Ustad Rashid Khan	Ismail Darbar
8.	"Phir Main Kaahe Mandir Jaaun (Aham Bhramasmi"	Alka Yagnik, Sukhwinder Singh, Vijay Prakash	Ismail Darbar
9.	"Kahe Ujadi Mori Neend"	Ustad Rashid Khan	Ismail Darbar
10.	"Kisna Theme"	Instrumental	A. R. Rahman
11.	"Mantras 1"	Vijay Prakash	A. R. Rahman
12.	"My Wish Comes True"	Sunitha Sarathy	A. R. Rahman
13.	"Mantras 2"	Vijay Prakash	A. R. Rahman
14.	"Kisna Theme I"	Instrumental	A. R. Rahman
15.	"Kisna Theme (Flute)"	Instrumental	A. R. Rahman
16.	"Kisna Theme II"	Instrumental	A. R. Rahman
