= Mischa Barton =

British and American actress (born 1986)

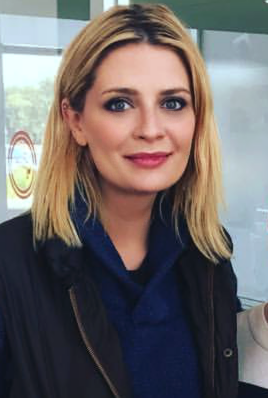
- Barton in 2017
- Born: Mischa Anne Marsden Barton; 24 January 1986 (age 40); Hammersmith, London, England
- Citizenship: United Kingdom; United States
- Occupations: Actress; model; fashion designer
- Years active: 1995–present
- Mother: Nuala Quinn-Barton

Mischa Anne Marsden Barton (born 24 January 1986) is a British and American film, television, and stage actress. She began her career on the stage, appearing in Tony Kushner's Slavs! and took the lead in James Lapine's Twelve Dreams at New York City's Lincoln Center. She made her screen debut with a guest appearance on the American soap opera All My Children (1995), and voicing Betty Ann Bongo on the Nickelodeon cartoon series KaBlam! (1996–97). Her first major film role was as the protagonist of Lawn Dogs (1997), a drama co-starring Sam Rockwell. She appeared in major pictures such as the romantic comedy Notting Hill (1999) and M. Night Shyamalan's psychological thriller The Sixth Sense (1999). She also starred in the indie crime drama Pups (1999).

Barton later appeared in the independent drama Lost and Delirious (2001) and guest-starred as Evan Rachel Wood's girlfriend on ABC's Once and Again (2001–02). She played Marissa Cooper in the Fox television series The O.C. (2003–2006), for which she received two Teen Choice Awards. The role brought Barton into mainstream fame, and Entertainment Weekly named her the "It Girl" of 2003.

Barton has since appeared in the comedy remake St Trinian's (2007), the Richard Attenborough–directed drama Closing the Ring (2007) and Assassination of a High School President (2008). She returned to television, starring in the short-lived Ashton Kutcher-produced CW series The Beautiful Life (2009).

In 2012, she returned to the stage, performing in the Irish production of Steel Magnolias. She also appeared alongside Martin Sheen in Bhopal: A Prayer for Rain (2014). She has garnered critical praise for her roles in independent films, with the Los Angeles Times praising her "standout" performance in Starcrossed (2014). Barton was cast in the first season of the MTV series The Hills: New Beginnings (2019–2021), a reboot of The Hills. In 2023, she was cast in an extended guest role for the rebooted Australian soap opera, Neighbours on Amazon Freevee and Network 10.

== Early life ==
Barton was born at Queen Charlotte's and Chelsea Hospital in Hammersmith, London, to an Irish mother, Nuala Quinn-Barton, a producer, and an English father, Paul Marsden Barton, a foreign exchange broker from Manchester.

Her maternal grandfather was an Irish language professor at Queen's University Belfast. She has two sisters, Hania (younger) and Zoë (older), the latter a barrister (KC) in London. Barton has stated that she briefly attended St. Paul's Girls' School in Hammersmith, but her father's work took the family to New York City when Barton was five years old. In 2006, she became a naturalised citizen of the United States, but retained her British citizenship. She is also eligible for Irish citizenship through her mother.

Barton attended East Side Middle School in New York City during the period where she was on screen in "The Sixth Sense". She graduated from the Professional Children's School in Manhattan in 2004, and took a summer short course called Acting Shakespeare at The Royal Academy of Dramatic Art in London, in June and July 2006, at Sir Richard Attenborough's urging, after he directed her in Closing the Ring.

== Career ==
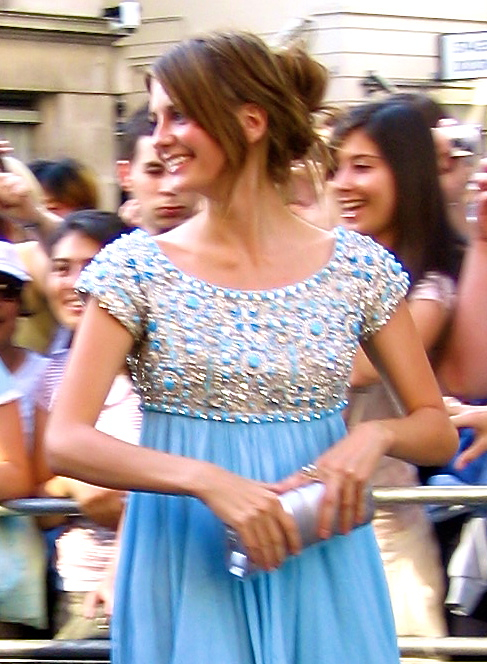
Barton in 2006

=== 1994–1997: Stage roles ===
Barton began acting at the age of eight, co-starring in the off-Broadway premiere of the 1994 play, Slavs!, written by Tony Kushner. Vincent Canby of The New York Times praised Barton's "so fine" and "chillingly authoritative" performance. New York magazine also praised her as "a darling little girl, [that] exhibits consummate charm". She appeared in several other Off-Broadway productions, taking a lead role in James Lapine's Twelve Dreams alongside Marisa Tomei at Lincoln Center. Canby again praised Barton, noting that she "has a sweet gravity as the doomed Emma". In 1996 Barton had a supporting role in Catherine Butterfield's Where the Truth Lies which opened at New York's Irish Repertory Theatre. The New York Times also remarked that "the winning child actresses Brittany Boyd and Mischa Barton are already smart enough not to overplay the naivete and precocity of their respective characters." In 1997, she appeared alongside Dianne Wiest at The Public Theater in Naomi Wallace's One Flea Spare. The New York production went on to win the Obie Award for Best Play.

=== 1997–2003: Feature films and television ===
She made her film debut in Lawn Dogs, which won awards at film festivals around the world. Barton won critical favour for her role, with Janet Maslin of The New York Times praising her "poised" performance and Empire celebrating her "hypnotic central performance". Barton then appeared in Notting Hill (1999) and The Sixth Sense (1999). Both films were critically and commercially successful, respectively earning $363,889,700 and $672,806,292. She also starred in Pups, a "Dog Day Afternoon for the MTV generation", alongside Burt Reynolds; along with her co-star Cameron Van Hoy, film critic Roger Ebert called their work in the film "two of the most natural and freed performances I have seen by actors of any age."

Barton first appeared on television in 1994, playing a young Corvina Lang in flashbacks in the soap opera All My Children. In 1996, she returned to the show, replacing Michelle Trachtenberg in the role of Lily Benton Montgomery. She guest-starred in eight episodes of the television series Once and Again as Jessie Sammler's (Evan Rachel Wood) girlfriend, Katie Singer. In 2001, she returned to film and starred in the independent Canadian drama, Lost and Delirious, based on the novel The Wives of Bath by Susan Swan. The film was met with mixed reviews, but the performances of Barton and her co-stars Piper Perabo and Jessica Paré were widely praised. She also starred in Julie Johnson (2001) alongside Lili Taylor and Courtney Love, playing the daughter of a woman in a lesbian relationship. Barton also had a supporting role in the independent teen drama Tart (2001) with Brad Renfro and Dominique Swain.

Other television appearances include an episode of the Fox series Fastlane (2003). She also appears as the love interest in James Blunt's music video "Goodbye My Lover" (2005) and in Enrique Iglesias' music video "Addicted" (2003).

=== 2003–2007: The O.C. ===
In August 2003, Fox premiered the television series The O.C., about affluent teenagers with stormy personal lives who reside in scenic Orange County, California. The show became an overnight success due to its large fanbase, and resulted in Barton's fame being increased through her role as Marissa Cooper. Barton departed from the show in the third-season finale in May 2006. During her time on the show, Barton garnered several Teen Choice Awards. She was also celebrated by Glamour as the "Next Big Thing". The O.C. dropped in ratings dramatically during its third and fourth seasons, and ended in early 2007.

In July 2006, Barton appeared on the British comedy variety show The Friday Night Project as a guest host. In 2007, Barton appeared in the films The Oh in Ohio and the comedy film Virgin Territory with Hayden Christensen. She also joined Shirley MacLaine and Christopher Plummer in Richard Attenborough's war drama Closing the Ring. Attenborough praised her, saying "her ability to convey pain and sadness, hopefulness and fear, is riveting". The Independent also noted that "she lends her character a beguiling vulnerability." She also appeared in the British comedy St Trinians (2007), appearing as a former head girl of that school advising current senior pupils on fashion and style. Later in 2007, Barton was cast in the international film produced by the Russian band t.A.T.u., called You and I. The film premiered at the Cannes Film Festival in May 2008 and was released theatrically in Russia in 2011.

=== 2008–2018: Independent films ===
She appeared in Assassination of a High School President (2008), co-starring Bruce Willis, which premiered at the 2008 Sundance Film Festival. The Hollywood Reporter praised Barton's "captivating" performance. She also starred in the horror film Walled In, which was released straight-to-DVD in March 2009. It received mixed reviews, but her performance was praised, with IGN calling her performance "terrific". Her next horror project, Homecoming, received a limited release in July 2009. Barton did not attend the premiere of the psychological thriller due to a medical issue. She also starred in the 2009 film Don't Fade Away. In early 2009 she began filming alongside Martin Sheen in Bhopal: A Prayer for Rain a biopic of the Bhopal gas tragedy.

In a December 2007 interview, she indicated she would return to television for the right project; "It's not that I dislike doing television at all. It would be interesting having more creative control over where the storylines go or the characters. But for the right thing, of course." In 2009 she starred as one of the main characters on The Beautiful Life a new series on The CW. The series was subsequently cancelled on 25 September 2009 after broadcasting two episodes. In December 2009, the technology company HP became the show's sponsor, airing the show's five episodes on YouTube. She guest starred on Law & Order: Special Victims Unit, played an endangered prostitute in an episode that aired on 3 March 2010. She has since mainly filmed horror and thriller projects, taking roles in The Sibling, Cyberstalker, a Lifetime television film and Apartment 1303 3D, the English-language remake of the Japanese horror film, Apartment 1303. Barton also appeared alongside Ryan Eggold in Mark Edwin Robinson's supernatural romance thriller, Into the Dark.

In May 2012, Barton discussed her recent preference for the horror genre, following roles in Homecoming, Apartment 1303 and Sibling "I literally became obsessed with that genre. I can't tell you. Because I never watched it when I was younger; it used to be way too terrifying for me." However Barton added that, "I think I've gone through my little phase, for the moment." In June, Barton appeared in Noel Gallagher's music video for Everybody's on the Run. In July 2012, Barton made her stage return in an Irish production of Steel Magnolias, playing Shelby. It premiered at the Gaiety Theatre, Dublin on 12 September, and a nationwide tour followed thereafter. After the premiere, Barton received praise for her performance. The Evening Herald wrote "Barton sparkles from the moment she steps on stage...Barton's Shelby is instantly magnetic".

On 8 March 2016, Barton competed on the 22nd season of Dancing with the Stars. She paired with professional dancer Artem Chigvintsev. On 4 April 2016, Barton and Chigvintsev were eliminated from the competition and finished in eleventh place. Later in 2016 Barton received praise for her role in the independent drama Starcrossed. Writing in the Los Angeles Times, Katie Walsh described how "Barton is a standout as the alluring, broken young woman who hides as much as she reveals." Barton was later critically recognized for her performance in Deserted, a psychological survival story written and directed by Ashley Avis. Barton plays Jae, a young woman recently released from prison who goes on a soul-searching journey into the desert with her brother Robin, played by Jackson Davis. "Barton is well-cast, grounded and burdened," and "...delivers one of her best performances in years." In 2018, Barton was cast in The Cat and the Moon, the directorial debut of Alex Wolff.

=== 2019–present: The Hills reboot, Neighbours and film roles ===
At the 2018 MTV Video Music Awards, MTV announced a reboot of The Hills titled The Hills: New Beginnings, slated to premiere in 2019. Barton was announced as part of the cast of the new series. She did not return for the second season. Barton had a cameo appearance in Spree, which starred Joe Keery of Stranger Things and premiered at the 2020 Sundance Film Festival. In October 2021, Barton was tapped to play an aspiring detective Miranda Green in the crime thriller film Invitation to a Murder, directed by Stephen Shimek.

In April 2023 it was announced that Barton would be a guest star in the rebooted Australian soap opera, Neighbours on Amazon Freevee and Australia's Network 10. Barton plays Reece Sinclair, who is the daughter of an American billionaire investing in Lassiters.

In 2025, Barton will star in Sleepwalker, a psychological thriller alongside Hayden Panettiere and Justin Chatwin. In the same year she was cast in Bad News on the Doorstep, a 1950s mafia crime thriller.

In October 2025 it was reported that Barton will make her UK stage debut in a new touring production of James M. Cain's 1943 novel, Double Indemnity, set to premiere in early 2026. Barton will play the female lead character, Phyllis Dietrichson.

== Modelling, fashion design, and endorsements ==
Barton has been in many television commercials and print advertising campaigns. Barton has modeled for companies Calvin Klein, bebe stores, Aéropostale, Monsoon Accessorize, Dooney & Bourke, JC (Jeans and Clothes), European clothing line Morgan de Toi, Jaspal, and Neutrogena skincare products. She became the spokesperson for Keds Sneakers, substantially increasing their sales. In Australia, she appears in commercials for teen magazine Famous and was the guest of honour at retail giant David Jones Tahitian Summer Collection launch. She has also endorsed Chanel jewelry, appearing at events for the brand. In a 2005 interview, she stated that she liked the Chanel brand because they produced a large number of clip-on earrings suitable for women who did not have pierced ears, as she did not at the time. In 2009, having had her ears pierced for her role in The Beautiful Life, she modeled jewelry for the company Inspired Creations, including pierced earrings and their Waxing Poetic range of charms.

Barton is a self-admitted fan of magic. In addition to being a guest member of the Magic Castle, she is also friends with a number of magicians and has often acted as a guest assistant to some of them, participating in illusions including being guillotined and sawed in half.

In 2008, she won the InStyle "icon of the year" award from Karl Lagerfeld at the Viper awards in Berlin.

Barton also became a spokesperson for the SAFE (Skin Awareness for Everyone) campaign in 2007. In addition, she lent her name to the TRAID campaign (Textile Recycling for Aid and International Development) in association with Visa Swap. Barton was photographed in April 2007 for the Fall 2007/2008 advertising campaign for Italian clothing brand Iceberg, modelling with Nicolas Bemberg.

In July 2008, she created a 14-piece handbag collection for online retailer ASOS. Barton was reportedly very involved in the line which retails from £20 to £145. She told ASOS magazine that she first discovered the website through her sister.

In December 2008, Barton premiered her line of headbands released on the Stacy Lapidus line. The headbands cost from $90 to $200. She also has a handbag line for London-based Ri2k, which is sold in the United Kingdom and Australia only. In early 2009, she became the "new face" of Herbal Essences.

In June 2010, she was announced as the face of Philipp Plein couture. Plein said, "Being in the limelight for a young and beautiful girl, the looks of course always get a lot of attention, Mischa Barton got a lot and learned to live with her fame. For me it was the big challenge to again show her as a Diva, a Rock 'n' Roll Goddess". The campaign will be circulated in international editions of leading fashion magazines.

In May 2011, Barton became the "exceptional godmother" of the Catalan designer Rosa Clará for her 2011 collection at Barcelona Bridal Week. Along with the Mexican singer Paulina Rubio, they became the stars of the show to celebrate the 15th anniversary of the signature of wedding dresses from Barcelona.

In October 2011, Barton appeared in a meat-themed photoshoot for Tyler Shields that was showcased at the Imitate Modern Gallery in London.

In 2012, Barton opened a short-lived clothes boutique in Spitalfields, London, later revealing “Retail is not exactly a cakewalk, so just taking care of the store and dealing with production, quality and employees. Just the whole thing became overwhelming and beyond expensive.”

== Personal life ==
Barton purchased a home in Beverly Hills at age nineteen, and subsequently sold the home in 2016. She was previously in long-term relationships with the oil heir Brandon Davis, musician Cisco Adler, and the Australian model James Abercrombie. In 2017, Barton won a revenge porn lawsuit against her former boyfriend, Jon Zacharias, stopping him from selling a sex tape of her.

In 2007, Barton was arrested in Los Angeles for drunk driving, marijuana possession, and driving without a license. She pled no contest and was sentenced to three years of unsupervised probation.

The O.C. creator Josh Schwartz later said that "Mischa was one of the young women stalked by photographers and treated unkindly by online bloggers. Fame hit in a certain way that would have been very hard for anyone to predict". Barton wrote in Harper's Bazaar in 2021 that she felt that she had been "sexualised" in her earlier film roles, even becoming a "strange sex symbol" at 13 in Asia where her movie Pups garnered significant attention. She also revealed that she felt pressure to lose her virginity at age 18 when she joined the cast of The OC as her character was sexually active. Barton also revealed that persistent press attention and paparazzi intrusion led to her having PTSD. In 2023, an article from 2005 circulated in which Barton stated a Hollywood publicist told her to sleep with Leonardo DiCaprio when she was just 18 years old in order to benefit her career.

=== Charitable affiliations ===
In 2009, Barton served as the spokesperson for Climate Star, an organization that fights global warming through social and legislative activism. In 2007, she worked with the home shopping company QVC to raise funds for women's cancer research.

In 2006, Barton served as a spokesperson for the SAFE (Skin Awareness for Everyone) campaign and also lent her name to the TRAID campaign (Textile Recycling for Aid and International Development) in 2007, in association with Visa Swap. In 2007, Barton also served as an ambassador for Save the Children and the "One Water" campaign which brings water to remote locations in Africa, and was on the board of the Lupus Research Committee in Los Angeles.

== Filmography ==
=== Film ===
†	Denotes productions that have not yet been released

Year	Title	Role	Notes
1995	Polio Water	Diane	Short film
1997	Lawn Dogs	Devon Stockard	
1999	Pups	Rocky	
1999	Notting Hill	12-Year-Old Actress	
1999	The Sixth Sense	Kyra Collins	
2000	Paranoid	Theresa	
2000	Skipped Parts	Maurey Pierce	
2001	Lost and Delirious	Mary 'Mouse' Bedford	
2001	Julie Johnson	Lisa Johnson	
2001	Tart	Grace Bailey	
2003	Octane	Natasha 'Nat' Wilson	
2006	The Oh in Ohio	Kristen Taylor	
2007	Closing the Ring	Young Ethel Ann	
2007	St Trinian's	JJ French	
2007	Virgin Territory	Pampinea	
2008	Assassination of a High School President	Francesca Fachini	
2008	You and I	Lana	
2009	Walled In	Sam Walczak	
2009	Homecoming	Shelby Mercer	
2010	Don't Fade Away	Kat	
2012	Into the Dark	Sophia Monet	
2012	Ben Banks	Amy	
2012	Apartment 1303 3D	Lara Slate	
2013	Bhopal: A Prayer for Rain	Eva Gascon	
2013	A Resurrection	Jessie	Also producer
2014	Zombie Killers: Elephant's Graveyard	Toni	
2014	Mining for Ruby	Jessica King	
2014	Hope Lost	Alina	
2015	L.A. Slasher	The Actress	
2015	Checkmate	Lauren Campbell	
2015	The Hoarder	Ella	
2015	Swat Unit: 877	Agent Melanie Hamlin	
2015	American Beach House	Ms. Maureen	
2015	Starcrossed	Kat	
2015	Operator	Pamela Miller	
2016	Deserted	Jae	
2017	Monsters at Large	Katie Parker	
2017	The Executor	Tara	
2018	The Malevolent	Ms Lowell	
2018	The Basement	Kelly Owen	
2018	The Toybox	Samantha	
2018	Ouija House	Samantha	
2018	Papa	Jennifer	
2018	Painkillers	The Girl	
2018	The Cat and the Moon	Jessica Petersen	
2020	Spree	London	
2023	Invitation to a Murder	Miranda Green	
2025	Murder at the Embassy	Miranda Green	
2026	Sleepwalker	Joelle Anders	
TBA	Bad News on the Doorstep †	Silvia	Post-production

=== Television ===
Year	Title	Role	Notes
1995	All My Children	Lily Montgomery	1 episode
1996	New York Crossing	Drummond	Movie
1996–97	KaBlam!	Betty Ann Bongo (voice)	Recurring role (15 episodes)
2000	Frankie & Hazel	Francesca 'Frankie' Humphries	Movie
2001–02	Once and Again	Katie Singer	Recurring role (8 episodes)
2002	A Ring of Endless Light	Vicky Austin	Movie
2003	Fastlane	Simone Collins	Episode: "Simone Says"
2003–06	The O.C.	Marissa Cooper	Main role (76 episodes)
2009	The Beautiful Life	Sonja Stone	Main role (5 episodes)
2010	Law & Order: Special Victims Unit	Gladys Dalton	Episode: "Savior"
2012	Cyberstalker	Aiden Ashley	Movie
2016	Recovery Road	Olivia	Episode: "Parties Without Borders"
2016	Dancing with the Stars	Herself	Contestant on season 22
2017	The Joneses Unplugged	Rebecca Jones	Movie
2019	The Hills: New Beginnings	Herself	Reality TV, main cast (season 1)
2021	Holiday Twist	Connie	Christmas movie
2023	Neighbours	Reece Sinclair	Extended guest role (32 episodes)

=== Music videos ===
Year	Title	Role	Artist
2003	"Addicted"	Love Interest	Enrique Iglesias
2005	"Goodbye My Lover"	Girlfriend	James Blunt
2012	"Everybody's on the Run"	Girl	Noel Gallagher's High Flying Birds
2014	"Coming Through"	Herself	Willis Earl Beal
2017	"Turn It Off"	Girl	Deap Vally

== Theatre ==
Year	Title	Role	Notes
1995	Slavs!	Vodya	
1995	Twelve Dreams	Emma	
1996	Where the Truth Lies	Cinda	
1997	One Flea Spare	Morse	
2012	Steel Magnolias	Shelby	Gaeity Theatre
2026	Double Indemnity	Phyllis Dietrichson	UK touring production

== Awards and nominations ==
Year	Association	Category	Work	Result
2004	Teen Choice Awards	Choice Breakout TV Star – Female	The O.C.	Won
2004	Teen Choice Awards	Choice TV Actress – Drama/Action Adventure	The O.C.	Nominated
2005	Teen Choice Awards	Choice TV Actress: Drama	The O.C.	Nominated
2005	Teen Choice Awards	Choice TV Chemistry with Ben McKenzie	The O.C.	Nominated
2005	Teen Choice Awards	Choice Red Carpet Fashion Icon: Female	—N/a	Nominated
2006	Teen Choice Awards	Choice TV Actress	The O.C.	Won
2006	Teen Choice Awards	Choice Red Carpet Fashion Icon: Female	—N/a	Nominated
