= Richard Bracewell =

English film director

- Richard Bracewell directing The Gigolos.
- Born: 28 November 1969 (age 56)
- Occupations: Director, producer

Richard Bracewell (born 28 November 1969) is an English film director best known for directing 2015 British comedy feature film Bill, which he also developed with writers Laurence Rickard and Ben Willbond. Bill was Bracewell's third feature film following The Gigolos and Cuckoo.

All three films were produced by production company Punk Cinema, which Bracewell set up in 2004 with his brother and fellow producer Tony Bracewell.

== Early life and career ==
Bracewell studied history at New College, Oxford, where he directed The Oxford Revue, before pursuing a career in film and television.

Initially, Bracewell made short films with writers such as David Wolstencroft and performers such as Al Murray. He also directed UK television comedy, including some of Ali G's external segments for The 11 O'Clock Show. Before directing feature films, he also worked at the Clapham Picture House in London.

== The Gigolos ==
Bracewell's debut movie The Gigolos (2007) stars Susannah York, Anna Massey and Siân Phillips alongside Sacha Tarter and Trevor Sather. Bracewell co-wrote the film with Tarter and Sather, and directed, produced and served as cinematographer on the film, which was shot in London in 2004. The Gigolos had a limited film release by Punk Cinema on 23 March 2007. The British Film Institute released The Gigolos on DVD in the UK on 9 February 2009. The film was shown in competition at the American Film Institute's AFI FEST in November 2005, where Bracewell participated in the New Faces in European Cinema initiative.

=== Reception ===
According to a contemporary report in The Guardian, the Los Angeles Times described The Gigolos as "a subtly delightful film". On its UK release, Ian Johns of The Times wrote that "intimate camerawork and scenes moodily capture half-revealed lives". Mike McCahill of The Daily Telegraph called it "a disarming debut" and praised Bracewell for subverting viewers' expectations. In 2010, he ranked The Gigolos first in his list of 50 underrated films.

== Cuckoo ==
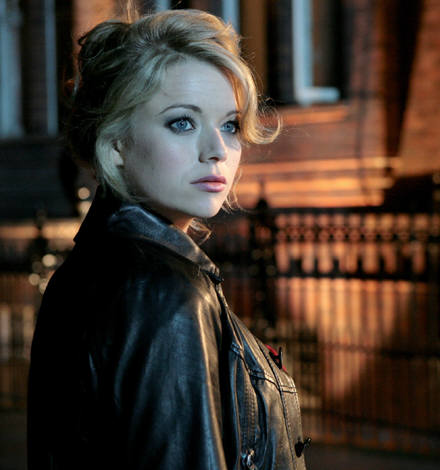
Antonia Bernath as Jimi in Cuckoo

Cuckoo was Bracewell's second feature, starring Richard E. Grant, Laura Fraser, Tamsin Greig, Antonia Bernath and Adam F. Bracewell wrote and directed the film, and co-produced it with his brother Tony Bracewell. The film was shot in Norwich and Great Yarmouth.

Cuckoo had its world premiere at the Cambridge Film Festival on 25 September 2009, with a second screening held the following day. The film was also screened at the Glasgow Film Festival in February 2010. Cuckoo was subsequently released in UK cinemas as planned, on 17 December 2010 by Verve Pictures.

=== Reception ===
On Rotten Tomatoes, Cuckoo has an approval rating of 10% based on ten critics' reviews. Donald Munro of Eye for Film described the film as a "disjointed, slightly disturbing viewing experience", praising its camerawork and soundtrack while noting its slow pace. On its UK cinema release, David Edwards gave the film four stars in the Daily Mirror, describing it as "an unsettling, unconventional film quite unlike anything our film industry is pumping out these days", and adding that "Fraser is superb as a woman who just might be on the verge of a nervous breakdown". Cath Clarke of The Guardian found the film initially creepy and claustrophobic, but criticised its lack of suspense and coherence.

== Bill ==
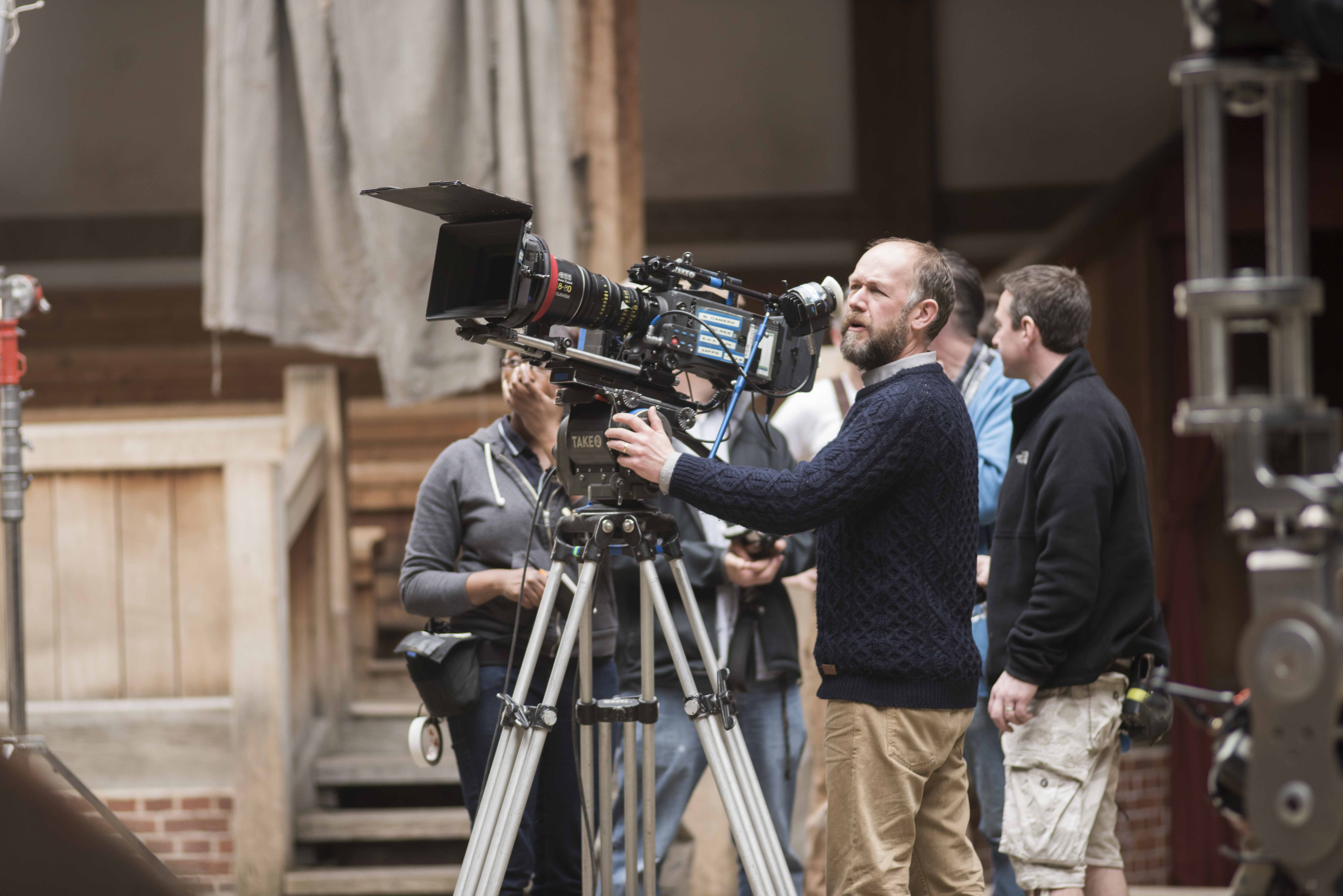
Richard Bracewell directing Bill at Shakespeare's Globe in March 2014

Bracewell began developing Bill after his daughter introduced him to the CBBC programme Horrible Histories. Having previously directed Ben Willbond in The Gigolos, Bracewell collaborated with Willbond and Laurence Rickard on a comedy about the origins of William Shakespeare, based on Shakespeare's "lost years" between 1585 and 1592.

BBC Films subsequently became involved in developing the screenplay with Punk Cinema in 2011. On 13 May 2013, BBC Films announced Bill as a production by Punk Cinema and Cowboy Films, with Bracewell attached to direct. The film was then financed by BBC Films, The British Film Institute, LipSync and Screen Yorkshire through its Yorkshire Content Fund.

Filming began in February 2014, with locations across Yorkshire, including York Minster, Skipton Castle, Marske-by-the-Sea, Bolton Castle and Selby Abbey. Other filming locations across England included Stowe School, Shakespeare's Globe and Weald and Downland Open Air Museum. Bracewell directed Bill and co-produced it with Tony Bracewell, Charles Steel and Alasdair Flind.

Bill was released in UK cinemas on 18 September 2015 by Vertigo Films, followed by a UK DVD and digital release through NBCUniversal on 15 February 2016. The film was screened at Adelaide Film Festival in October 2015 and received a one-night theatrical release in the United States on 11 April 2016.

=== Reception ===
The film received positive reviews and has an approval rating of 90% on Rotten Tomatoes, based on 21 critics' reviews. Peter Bradshaw of The Guardian praised the film's humour, comparing it to the Carry On films, Blackadder and Monty Python. Nigel Andrews wrote in the Financial Times: "This is a comedy. And a puckish, inventive, funny one."

In February 2016 interview with Den of Geek, Bracewell described the film's deliberately low-budget aesthetic and cited Monty Python, Blackadder and Star Wars among its influences. Earlier that year, Bill received a nomination for the Award for Comedy at the Evening Standard British Film Awards, recognising Bracewell alongside writers Laurence Rickard and Ben Willbond.
