= Lost and Delirious =

2001 film by Léa Pool

- The promotional poster for the film
- Directed by: Léa Pool
- Screenplay by: Judith Thompson
- Based on: The Wives of Bath by Susan Swan
- Produced by: Greg Dummett; Lorraine Richard; Louis-Philippe Rochon
- Starring: Piper Perabo; Jessica Paré; Mischa Barton
- Cinematography: Pierre Gill
- Edited by: Gaétan Huot
- Music by: Yves Chamberland
- Production companies: Greg Dummett Films; Cite-Amerique
- Distributed by: Seville Pictures (Canada); Lions Gate Films (USA)
- Release dates: January 21, 2001 (Sundance Film Festival); June 20, 2001
- Running time: 103 minutes
- Country: Canada
- Language: English
- Box office: $307,233

Lost and Delirious (French: Rebelles) is a 2001 Canadian drama film directed by Léa Pool, and based on the novel The Wives of Bath by Susan Swan. Lost and Delirious is told from the perspective of Mary (Mischa Barton), who observes the changing love between her two teenage friends, Pauline (Piper Perabo) and Victoria (Jessica Paré). The film premiered at the 2001 Sundance Film Festival.

== Plot ==
Mary (nicknamed Mouse) is a new student at the all girls' boarding school, and dorms with Pauline (nicknamed Paulie) and Victoria (nicknamed Tori). In an effort to get the shy Mary to break out of her shell, Paulie and Tori involve her in their activities, such as running in the mornings. When they hear that Mary's mother has died, Paulie nicknames her "Mary Brave."

Mary observes the intimacy between her two dorm mates. Peering out a window at night, she sees them kissing on a roof. Paulie and Tori's relationship is close and Paulie is full of life. At one point she turns a quiet afternoon on the campus into a music-blasting dance party and spikes the punch. In another moment, she defends Victoria from a frustrated math teacher who humiliates her when she does not understand a math problem.

When the three are running one day, Paulie comes across a hurt falcon, which she befriends. After reading up on falcons, she trains the animal. While she is tending to the falcon, Mary and Tori come across some boys from the nearby boys school. One of them, called Jake, flirts with Tori, asking if she will be attending her brother's 18th birthday party and making it clear that he likes her. When Mary and Tori are alone, Tori expresses disgust at the boy's interest in her, saying, "He liked my tits." When Mary asks if she'll go to the party, Tori says, "And have all those gross guys groping me? I'd rather stay home."

Over time, Paulie and Tori become more comfortable showing affection in front of Mary. It progresses from a quick kiss on the lips in front of her, to the two having sex while Mary is sleeping.

One morning, Tori's younger sister and friends rush into the room to wake up the older girls. Paulie is lying in Tori's bed, and it is clear that the two are totally naked. Horrified silence falls over everyone, and Paulie unconvincingly claims she was in bed with Tori because the latter has nightmares.

Mary pushes Tori's sister out of the room and closes the door. Tori angrily tells Paulie to get out of her bed. When confronted by her sister, she tries to extinguish her sister's suspicions by telling her Paulie has an unrequited crush on her and crawled into her bed. Her sister promises to "fix" the rumors about Tori and not tell their parents anything. As she walks away from this conversation, Tori collapses into tears, disgusted at herself due to her cowardice and unwillingness to confess being a lesbian and in love with Paulie.

In the library, Tori explains to Mary that her family, her parents and her sister, are strongly homophobic, and she must stop the lesbian sexual relationship to prevent their rejection. Mary sympathizes with both of her friends, as she too feels rejected by her father, who does not bother to show up to a father/daughter dance. The break up is not clean though. Paulie degenerates into abusive behavior, like destroying a mirror and thrashing a dish cart to the floor. She is sent further over the edge after receiving a letter from the agency that handled her adoption saying that her birth mother refused a request from Paulie to get in touch. Meanwhile, Tori starts going out with Jake and publicly ignores Paulie.

Tori has sex with Jake, which prompts Paulie to declare a duel with him, with the victor winning Tori. After she kicks his leg, during a fencing match, throwing him to the ground, she demands that he give up Tori to her. When Jake brushes her off, she stabs him in the leg. Mary rushes to stop her. Paulie then runs off. Mary runs to Victoria's soccer match, which is being watched by the principal and the main teacher. Just after reaching the group, Mary sees Paulie, sobbing from the top of a building. Crying out for her beloved, she jumps to her death, after quoting William Shakespeare.

== Cast ==
- Piper Perabo as Pauline "Paulie" Oster
- Jessica Paré as Victoria "Tori" Moller
- Mischa Barton as Mary "Mouse" Bedford
- Jackie Burroughs as Fay Vaughn
- Mimi Kuzyk as Eleanor Bannet
- Graham Greene as Joe Menzies
- Emily VanCamp as Allison, Tori's sister
- Amy Stewart as Cordelia
- Caroline Dhavernas as Kara
- Luke Kirby as Jake
- Alan Fawcett as Bruce, Tori's father
- Peter Oldring as Phil
- Grace Kung as Lauren

== Reception ==
On Rotten Tomatoes, it has an approval rating of 51% based on reviews from 59 critics. The site's consensus is that "Lost and Delirious becomes exactly that, as the film sinks into overwrought melodrama and clichéd, obvious symbolism." On Metacritic it has a score of 53% based on reviews from 20 critics, indicating "mixed or average reviews".

The performances of Perabo, Paré and Barton were praised. Perabo's performance in particular received critical acclaim, which Loren King of the Chicago Tribune remarked was her "breakout performance". Entertainment Weekly's Owen Gleiberman called her "an actress of glittering ferocity" and her performance "a geyser of emotion". Jim Lane of the Sacramento News & Review said that "Perabo is a revelation, wild and fiery—it’s a breakthrough performance, astonishing in its fervency" and Roger Ebert praised her performance for its sincerity and "wonderful abandon and conviction". Ebert went on to give the film three-and-a-half out of four stars, writing that the film "stirred within me memories of that season in adolescence when the heart leaps up in passionate idealism—and inevitably mingles it with sexual desire." Ebert praised Pool as she "creates a lush, thoughtfully framed, and composed film; her classical visual style lends gravitas to this romantic story."

=== Accolades ===
Year	Award	Category	Result
2001	Mar del Plata Film Festival	"ADF Cinematography Award"	Won
2001	Stockholm Film Festival	"Audience Award"	Won
2001	Valladolid International Film Festival	"Golden Spike"	Nominated
2002	Verona Love Screens Film Festival	"Best Film"	Nominated
2002	Directors Guild of Canada	"DCT Team Award - Outstanding Achievement in a Feature Film"	Nominated
2002	Canadian Society of Cinematographers Awards	"Best Cinematography in Theatrical Feature" - Pierre Gill	Won
2002	Genie Awards	"Best Performance by an Actress in a Supporting Role" - Mimi Kuzyk	Nominated
2002	Genie Awards	"Best Screenplay" - Judith Thompson	Nominated
2002	Genie Awards	"Best Achievement in Cinematography" - Pierre Gill	Won

== Production details ==
The film was based on the novel The Wives of Bath by Susan Swan and was adapted by Toronto screenwriter Judith Thompson. It is the first English-language film by Swiss-born director Léa Pool and the first time she made a film not based on a script she had written herself. The movie was filmed in Lennoxville, Quebec on the Bishop's University Campus and across the St Francois River at the secondary school Bishop's College School. Students attending summer classes there during filming were used as extras.

== Soundtrack ==
The film's score was provided by Yves Chamberland. No official soundtrack was released, but the film contains the following songs:

- "Beautiful"

Written and Performed by Meshell Ndegeocello
Maverick Records

- "Add It Up"

Performed by Violent Femmes
Written by Gordon Gano
Beyond Music

- "You Had Time"

Written and Performed by Ani DiFranco
Righteous Babe Records

- "River Waltz"

Performed by Cowboy Junkies
Written by Michael Timmins
Cowboy Junkies Inc.

- "Sanctus" from Missa Luba

Performed by Muungano National Choir
Universal Music

== See also ==
- List of LGBT films directed by women
- List of lesbian filmmakers
