= Invitation to a Murder =

2023 American murder mystery film

- Promotional poster
- Directed by: Stephen Shimek
- Screenplay by: Brian O'Donnell
- Story by: Gérard Miller
- Produced by: Jerome Reygner-Kalfon; Sebastien Semon; Zeus Zamani
- Starring: Mischa Barton; Chris Browning; Bianca A. Santos; Giles Matthey
- Cinematography: Brian Vilim
- Edited by: Kristi Shimek
- Music by: Christian Davis
- Distributed by: Lionsgate
- Release date: April 25, 2023
- Country: United States
- Language: English

Invitation to a Murder (released as An Invitation to Murder in the UK) is a 2023 American murder mystery film directed by Stephen Shimek and starring Mischa Barton, Chris Browning, Bianca A. Santos, and Giles Matthey. It was released by Lionsgate on April 25, 2023.

== Plot ==
Miranda Green is a florist with a passion for mystery novels, particularly those by Agatha Christie. The arrival of a mysterious invitation from Lord Findley to visit his mansion on a reclusive island immediately catches her attention. On the train, Miranda makes the acquaintance of five other guests — Donald Walker, an American journalist; Lawrence Kane, Esq.; Dr. Phillip Armstrong; Carmen Blanco, and Lu Wang.

Welcoming the guests are the three members of Lord Findley's staff, who is apparently stranded due to bad weather and will only join them by plane the next day. As the hours go by, the guests become increasingly tense because of the unusual situation they find themselves in. Not only do they not know each other, but they have never even heard of Lord Findley, nor do they know the reason why they were invited to the island. Moreover, the servants are particularly hostile. The tension reaches a peak when Lawrence Kane is found dead, and his body disappears from the lounge. It is up to Miranda Green to solve the puzzle as well as the crime; there is a murderer in their midst.

After the lead butler is found dead, Miranda determines that the "butler" is actually Findley in disguise, observing them all. After realising that Kane's death was faked, Miranda deduces that she and the other guests are all the illegitimate children of Lord Findley (half-siblings as they all have different mothers), who set this weekend up as a test of his children to determine which of them would inherit his fortune. As Miranda thinks on the matter further, she deduces that the one who killed Findley was Walker, the oldest of them; his mother was never able to move on from her relationship with Findley and died, having failed to properly establish herself in favour of waiting for him to join them in America.

According to the Will, Walker was always intended to be the heir with the weekend only vetting of Walker's worth. With Walker arrested, the Will left the fortune to Findley's company and for the board of directors to determine an heir. Miranda and her siblings all reject Findley's inheritance, wanting nothing to do with the father who abandoned them. Kane accepts their decision and makes arrangements for the board of directors to determine an heir from amongst themselves, apologising to the rest for how far Findley's game went. As they depart the estate, Miranda expresses her intent to become a more official investigator, and Findley's various children all agree to remain in each other's lives.

== Cast ==
- Mischa Barton as Miranda Green
- Chris Browning as Donald Walker
- Seamus Dever as Lawrence Kane
- Bianca A. Santos as Carmen Blanco
- Giles Matthey as Dr. Phillip Armstrong
- Grace Lynn Kung as Lu Wang
- James Urbaniak as Gordon
- Amy Sloan as Katherine
- Alex Hyde-White as Sean

== Production ==
Production began in late 2021.

== Release ==
The film was published for digital release on 25 April 2023 by Lionsgate.

== Sequels ==
Mischa Barton reprised the role of Miranda Green for two sequels, Murder at the Embassy and The Mystery of the Golden Spear, with the former released on November 14, 2025.
