= Ben Reed =

American actor

- Education: West Virginia University
- Occupations: Actor, producer
- Years active: 1989–present
- Children: 2

Ben Reed is an American actor and producer.

== Career ==
Reed began his acting career when he appeared in the 1990 sitcom Babes.

His television credits include The Young and the Restless, CSI: Crime Scene Investigation, Murder, She Wrote, Lois & Clark: The New Adventures of Superman, House, Seinfeld and NCIS.

He played Wayne Kyle, the father of Bradley Cooper's character in the critically acclaimed 2014 Clint Eastwood film American Sniper.

== Personal life ==
Reed had a brief relationship with country artist Tanya Tucker and had two children together, a daughter (b. 1989) and a son (b. 1991).

== Filmography ==
=== Film ===
Year	Title	Role	Notes
1991	Frame Up	Rick McDonald	
1994	Scanner Cop	Rick Kopek	Direct-to-video
1994	Molly & Gina	Slick	
1995	The Killers Within		
1995	Ballistic	Thorpe	
1997	Face/Off	Pilot	
2000	Cursed Part 3		Short film
2010	Play Me	Jack McIntyre	Short film
2012	Momentum	Secret Service Agent	Short film
2013	Lifewaves	Joseph's Father / Dr. Kader	Short film
2013	Freedom Lovers	Gregory Matthews	Short film
2014	Starcrossed	Anthony Bishop	
2014	American Sniper	Wayne Kyle	
2014	Dulcie's Date	Jack Haggerty	Short film
2015	The Pinhole Affect	Stanley Stone Sr.	Short film
2016	We Men Are Lions	Jim	Short film
2016	Inconceivable	Walt	
2017	The Meanest Man in Texas	Rees Thompson	
2017	The Greatest Showman	Mill Worker	
2018	Persephone: Pictures at the End of the World	The Preacher	
2019	Your Family or Your Life	Mike Gallagher	
2019	Immortal	Chuck	

=== Television ===
Year	Title	Role	Notes
1990	Babes	Vince	Episode: "Bend Me, Shape Me"
1993	Seinfeld	Male Nurse	Episode: "The Outing"
1995	Murder, She Wrote	Rex Toland	Episode: "Shooting in Rome"
1996	Lois & Clark: The New Adventures of Superman	Matt Young	Episode: "Never on Sunday"
1998	Hercules: The Legendary Journeys	Thor	Episodes: "Norse by Norsevest" and "Somewhere Over the Rainbow Bridge"
1999	Will & Grace	Richard Keller	Episode: "Will Works Out"
2002	Reba	Greg Hewitt	Season 2, Episode 6 "Safe Dating"
2005	CSI: Crime Scene Investigation	Construction Guy	Episode: "Nesting Dolls"
2006	Fashion House	Dr. Matthew Evans	13 episodes
2009	House	Joseph	Episode: "The Softer Side"
2013–present	Broken at Love	Dr. Eduardo Taylor	4 episodes
2016	Giles Vanderhoot		Television movie
2018	Bad Tutor	Jared	Television movie
