= Susan Swan =

Canadian author (born 1945)

Susan Swan CM
- Born: 9 June 1945 (age 81); Midland, Ontario
- Citizenship: Canadian
- Writing career
- Notable works: The Biggest Modern Woman of the World, The Wives of Bath, The Western Light, The Dead Celebrities Club

Susan Swan CM (born 9 June 1945) is a Canadian author, journalist, and professor. Susan Swan writes classic Canadian novels. Her fiction has been published in 20 countries and translated into 10 languages. She is the co-founder of the Carol Shields Prize for Fiction, the largest literary award in the world for women and non binary fiction authors, and received an Order of Canada in 2023 for her writing and its contribution to Canadian literature and for mentoring the next generation of writers.

Born in Midland, Ontario, she studied at McGill University. Her novels include The Biggest Modern Woman in the World (1983), The Last of The Golden Girls (1989), The Wives of Bath (1993), What Casanova Told Me (2004), and The Western Light (2012). Swan's latest novel is The Dead Celebrities Club (2019). The Globe and Mail called it a "timely tale of greed and corruption, worthy of the age". The Wives of Bath was made into the film Lost and Delirious in 2001, starring Piper Perabo, Jessica Paré, and Mischa Barton. The film was listed in the official selection in the Sundance Film Festival. Her first novel, The Biggest Modern Woman of the World, about a Canadian giantess related to Swan who exhibited with PT Barnum, is being made into a television series.

Swan currently mentors graduate students in creative writing MA's at the University of Toronto and Guelph University. She was the Robarts Scholar for Canadian Studies at York University from 1999 to 2000 and taught in the Faculty of Humanities at York University from 1991 to 2007 before retiring as a professor to concentrate on her writing. She has participated in the Humber College Humber Writer's Circle at Lakeshore Campus and was Chair of The Writers' Union of Canada for 2007–2008.

== Life ==
Swan grew up in Midland, Ontario, and has a younger brother John. Swan was a bookworm as a child and wrote stories to entertain herself and her friends. An early short story by Swan was deemed plagiarism by her Grade Seven teacher who said the writing was too good to have been written by a young girl. Swan's parents were Jane Cowan of Sarnia, Ontario, and Dr. Churchill Swan, a Midland G.P.

Swan attended Midland Public School and as a teenager, she worked as a reporter on the Midland Free Press. From 1959 to 1963, she was a boarder at Toronto's Havergal College, which inspired one of her novels. Swan has a general B.A. from McGill University (1964–67) where she worked on The McGill Daily. Swan was also editor of The McGill Scene, a newspaper for Montreal high school students that was banned under Swan's editorship. Swan later worked as a reporter for several Toronto daily newspapers before turning to magazine freelance and novel writing.

On 27 March 1969, she married Barry Haywood in the boardroom of The Telegram, where Swan was the education reporter. They had one daughter, Samantha Haywood (1973–) and the two were later divorced. Swan's longtime partner is Canadian publisher Patrick Crean.

== Career ==
Swan is a writer and journalist who was also a performance artist from 1975 to 1979, performing odes on subjects like self-pity and figure skater Barbara Ann Scott called Queen of the Silver Blades. But she is best known for her critically praised fiction, which has been published in twenty countries. Gender is often a theme in her earlier books, which examined the dilemma of inhabiting a female body in a male-dominated Western culture. One critic called her "a contemporary Charles Dickens” while another critic, The New Yorker writer James Wood, said her novels belong to the category of "the avant-garde of content", a term Wood uses to describe his belief that the progressive development of fiction writing now centres on the subject matter a writer chooses to explore. Swan's latest novels have expressed a young woman's longing for fatherly love.

Susan's latest novel is The Dead Celebrities Club, published in 2019 by Cormorant books. The Globe and Mail called it "a timely tale of greed and corruption, worthy of the age". The story follows hedge fund whale, Dale Paul, a witty, self-absorbed rogue and raconteur who is sent to an upstate New York white collar jail on multiple counts of fraud for gambling away US military pensions. Promising himself to earn back his son's previously gambled inheritance, Dale Paul dreams up an illegal lottery for his fellow inmates based on the death of old and frail celebrities. The novel was born out of Swan's obsession at the time with con men and whether they can change.

Swan's novel, The Western Light, is a prequel to The Wives of Bath. The story revolves around the life of young Mouse Bradford who is torn between love for her father and the charismatic asylum inmate John Pilkie, an ex-Red Wings hockey player, serving a life sentence for the murder of his wife and baby girl. Set in Madoc's Landing, a fictional Ontario town on Georgian Bay, The Western Light weaves in details of the history of the Ontario oil boomtown Petrolia, hockey mania, bootlegging taxi drivers, and debates over psychiatry and universal health care. The novel was published by Cormorant Books in Canada (September 2012) and was also picked as one of the top ten fiction and non-fiction 2012 books by the Ontario Library Association.

Swan's previous work, What Casanova Told Me, links two women from different centuries through a long-lost journal about travels with Casanova in the Mediterranean. It celebrates travel as a form of love. What Casanova Told Me was published by Knopf in Canada (hardcover September 2004 and paperback 2005) and in the US by Bloomsbury (hardcover 2005 and paperback 2006). It was also published in Spain, Russia, Serbia and Portugal. What Casanova Told Me was a finalist for the Commonwealth Writers' Prize (Canada and Caribbean Region). It was a Globe and Mail Best Book; a Calgary Herald Top 10; a Now (Toronto) Top 10; and a Sun Times (Owen Sound) Top 10; and Asked For Adams was named one of Maclean's Top 5 literary characters for 2004. Swan shares a Puritan background with her heroine Asked For Adams. A branch of Swan's family immigrated to America in 1635 and settled near Boston before moving to Canada two centuries later. What Casanova Told Me was made into Canada's first five-minute book short by film producer Judith Keenan. It also inspired the song "What Casanova Told Me" by Albertan folk singer Cori Brewster who recorded it on her 2007 album Large Bird Leaving.

Swan's 1993 novel The Wives of Bath, a darkly humorous tale about a murder in a girls' boarding school, was a finalist for the UK's Guardian Fiction Prize and Ontario's Trillium Book Award. It was picked by a U.S. Readers' Guide as one of the best novels of the 1990s. A feature film based on The Wives of Bath was released in the summer of 2001 in the U.S. and Canada under the title Lost and Delirious. The film starring Piper Perabo, Jessica Paré, and Mischa Barton was shown in 32 countries, and was picked for premiere selection at Sundance and Berlin Film Festival in 2001.

Swan's other novels include The Biggest Modern Woman of the World (1983), based on a true-life ancestor, a giantess who exhibited with P.T. Barnum, which was a finalist for Books in Canada First Novel Award and the Governor General's Award for Fiction. It is currently being made into a television series by Temple Street Productions with Canadian playwright Hannah Moscovitch adapting the book for screen. The Last of the Golden Girls (1989), about the sexual awakening of young women in Ontario cottage country, was originally published in 1989, and recently reissued in hardcover. Her collection of short stories, Stupid Boys are Good to Relax With was published in 1996. Two of its stories were published in Granta and in Ms. Magazine.

In collaboration with editor Janice Zawerbny, Swan was one of the founders of the Carol Shields Prize for Fiction.

== Swan's literary influence ==
Swan's impact on the Canadian literary and political scene has been far-reaching. Swan coined the term "sexual gothic" to describe contemporary gothic novels that use the body as the site of the narrative the way 19th-century gothic novels used a ruined building as their literary setting. "Gender gothic" is another name for sexual gothic since many novels in the 1990s dealt with aspects of gender or gender changes. In the fall of 1993, a theatrical dramatization of The Wives of Bath was performed in Toronto, Chicago and New York with the Canadian authors Barbara Gowdy and Eric McCormack. The theatrical evening was billed, "An Evening of Sexual Gothic".

Swan also coined the term "the burden of adjustment" to describe the adjustment demanded of readers by sexist or racist prose. For instance, many nineteenth-century novels have racist and sexist stereotypes embedded in the story. Swan compared the burden to the less difficult adjustment one makes reading Shakespeare or say, any novel where the gender and race of the protagonist are different from the gender and race of the reader.

Swan said: "The burden of adjustment becomes a problem when a great work of art or literature either appears to portray or portrays one of the groups you or I belong to as stereotyped or inferior". Swan advocated putting up with the burden of adjustment when the text gave the reader a major reward. Swan's theory was outlined in a talk at the York University premier lecture series on 26 February 1998.

== Literary influences ==
Early on, Swan was encouraged by the success of prominent Canadian women writers like Marian Engel who wrote the novel Bear and Margaret Atwood, who like Swan, works in many disciplines. Swan's first novel, The Biggest Modern Woman of the World, purportedly a lecture by a show business giantess, grew out of Swan's work in performance art during the 1970s.

== Controversy ==
Swan's novels are no strangers to controversy. A Canadian customs' official once confiscated The Wives of Bath at the Canadian border because he said it was obscene and shouldn't be read in Canada. By then the novel had already been nominated for Ontario's Trillium and the Guardian Fiction prize.

Swan herself has been involved in literary disputes. She once asked The Globe and Mail fiction critic William French to resign on television because he criticized the apocalyptic ending of The Last of the Golden Girls as "unrealistic". Swan argued that literary realism is itself an artificial construct and not realistic in the sense French meant.

Swan was one of the signatories in the controversial University of British Columbia letter asking for due process for Steven Galloway, a UBC creative writing professor accused of sexual assault. In 2016, the allegations of sexual assault against Galloway couldn't be substantiated by Justice Mary Boyd. In 2021, Justice Elaine Adair ruled against anti-SLAPP motions brought by 11 defendants in Galloway's defamation trial, allowing the defamation trial to continue.

== Teaching ==
Swan has taught creative writing workshops all over Europe and recently retired from teaching creative writing as an associate professor of humanities at York University to focus on her books. She currently mentors creative writing students for the University of Toronto and the University of Guelph and teaches in the Correspondence Program at Humber College.

In 1999–2000, she was awarded the Millennial Robarts Chair in Canadian Studies. As chair, she hosted the successful Millennial Wisdom Symposium in Toronto featuring artists and social scientists debating the ways the past is recreated in popular culture and what wisdom the past has to offer as we move into the new century. The symposium was inspired by her research into her book about Casanova.

Swan was appointed to the Order of Canada in June 2023.

== Politics ==
She was chair of the Writers' Union of Canada (2007–2008) and brought in a new benefits deal for Canadian writers. She is also a member of Community Air, a group of Toronto citizens opposed to the expansion of the Island Airport.

== Works ==
=== Books ===
- Unfit For Paradise (1981)
- The Biggest Modern Woman of the World (1983)
- The Last of the Golden Girls (1989)
- The Wives of Bath (1993)
- Stupid Boys Are Good To Relax With (1996)
- What Casanova Told Me (2004)
- The Western Light (2012)
- The Dead Celebrities Club (2019)

== Sources ==
- "Susan Swan" The Canadian Encyclopedia
- The Western Light The Quill and Quire Review of The Western Light
- Susan Swan Online
- "Susan Swan" Transatlantic Agency Author Profile
