= Slavs! =

Play written by Tony Kushner

- Original language: English
- Written by: Tony Kushner
- Characters: Kathrerina Serafima Gleb; Vodya Domik; Prelapsarianov
- Genre: Drama-comedy

Premiere
- Date: March 8, 1994
- Place: Actors Theatre of Louisville, Louisville, Kentucky

Slavs!: Thinking About the Longstanding Problems of Virtue and Happiness is a 1994 play by Tony Kushner, set during the dissolution of the Soviet Union and its later rebirth as a collection of independent states. The play has four acts, beginning in 1985 and ending in 1992. The play premiered at the Actors Theatre of Louisville in Louisville, Kentucky, on 8 March 1994. It later moved to the New York Theatre Workshop on 12 December 1994, in a production featuring Marisa Tomei and Mischa Barton.

== Plot ==
The action begins in Moscow in March 1985 as Mikhail Gorbachev succeeds Konstantin Chernenko as general secretary of the Communist Party.

Katherina is a feisty lesbian security guard at a Soviet archive facility that holds the brains of the USSR's late leaders. After getting her the job at the facility, Popolitipov (Jones), an apparatchik, attempts to woo her. Unfortunately for Popolitipov, she has already fallen for the oncologist Bonfila (Schulz), a descendant of one of the fathers of the revolution.

Serge is a Bolshevik whose obsession with the future has deadly results. Vodya is a young girl that is dying from nuclear waste poisoning. She appears as both an apparition during a man's inebriated state and again in 1992 in Siberia but this time alive and mute. It is there in Siberia where Katherina and Bonfila confront the fallout and human misery caused by nuclear waste. Rodent, an unintelligent bureaucrat, is also sent on a good-will mission to the country, where he confronts the misery of a mute Vodya and her enraged mother.

== Characters ==
=== Main characters ===
- Aleksii Antedilluvianovich Prelapsarianov – A Politburo member of incalculable rank, the world's oldest living Bolshevik, considerably older than ninety.
- Katherina Serafima Gleb – A security guard at the [fictional] Pan-Soviet Archives for the Study of Cerebro-Cephalognomical Historico-Biological Materialism (also known as PASOVACERCEPHHIBIMAT). An inebriated young woman in her twenties.
- Ippolite Ippolitovich Popolitipov – An apparatchik of some importance, a sour man in his sixties.
- Bonfila Bezukhovna Bonch-Bruevich – A pediatric oncologist, a pleasant woman in her thirties.
- Serge Esmereldovich Upgobkin – A high-ranking Politburo member, an optimistic man in his eighties.
- Vodya Domik – A silent little girl, eight years old.
- Yegor Tremens Rodent – An apparatchik of less importance, attached to Popolitipov; a nervous type in his fifties.

=== Minor characters ===
- First Babushka – A snow sweep of indeterminate age.
- Second Babushka – Another snow sweep of indeterminate age.
- Vassily Vorovilich Smukov – A high-ranking Politburo member, a pessimistic man in his seventies.
- Big Babushka – Yet another snow sweep of indeterminate age, garrulous, large, with a moustache.
- Mrs Shastlivyi Domik – An unhappy, angry woman in her forties.

== New York production ==
=== Cast ===
- Marisa Tomei as Katherina Serafima Gleb
- Mischa Barton as Vodya Domik
- Joseph Wiseman as Prelapsarianov
- Barbara Eda-Young as First Babushka and Mrs. Domik
- Ben Hammer as Smukov
- John Christopher Jones as Popolitipov
- Mary Shultz as Second Babushka and Bonch-Bruevich
- David Chandler as Rodent
- Gerald Hiken as Serge

Crew

- Direction by Lisa Peterson
- Set design by Neil Patel
- Costumes by Gabriel Berry
- Lighting by Christopher Akerlind
- Sound by Darron L. West

== Reception ==
Slavs!’s New York production was warmly received by Vincent Canby of The New York Times, with Canby writing that "[Kushner] has created a rambunctiously funny, seriously moving stage piece that is part buffoonish burlesque and part tragic satire. From beginning to end, it's also shot through with the kind of irony virtually unknown in today's theater, movies and television, where sarcasm passes for wit." Canby continued to describe the play as "a work of a brilliant and restless imagination." Canby continued "Mr. Kushner's words dazzle, sting and prompt belly laughs. In them are also echoes of the kind of Russian mysticism that can be detected in Chekhov, though these echoes are now filtered through minds shaped by, or reacting to, party dogma." Canby also praised the performances: "All of the performers are good, and some are extremely good: Mr. Wiseman, Mr. Hiken, Ms. Shultz, Mr. Jones, Mr. Chandler, even the tiny, chillingly authoritative Ms. Barton." He also described Tomei's performance as "another astonishment."

New York Magazine praised the performances of Wiseman and Barton, "a darling little girl, exhibits consummate charm even in delivering the kind of over-wrought rhetoric Kushner has everyone mouthing". The magazine also notes that Patel's "designed scenery displays considerable grace under pressure".

== Publication ==
Slavs! is published by Broadway Play Publishing Inc. in the collection Plays By Tony Kushner as well as in an acting edition.
