= Bad News on the Doorstep =

American coming-of-age drama film

- Directed by: Tom DeNucci
- Screenplay by: Tom DeNucci; Joe Cervasio
- Based on: Bad News on the Doorstep: Inspired by a true story by Joe Cervasio
- Produced by: Chad A. Verdi; Michelle Verdi; Chad Verdi Jr.; Paul Luba; Sera Verdi
- Starring: Chazz Palminteri; Robert Davi; Dante Palminteri; Nick Davi
- Music by: Chris Walden
- Production company: Verdi Productions
- Release date: August 8, 2026 (Rhode Island International Film Festival)
- Country: United States
- Language: English

Bad News on the Doorstep is a 2026 American coming-of-age drama film directed by Tom DeNucci from a script written by DeNucci and Joe Cervasio adapted from the novel of the same name by Cervasio. It has a cast led by Chazz Palminteri and Robert Davi and their real-life sons Dante Palminteri and Nick Davi, and also including Mischa Barton and former NFL player Rob Gronkowski.

The film premiered on August 8, 2026 at the Rhode Island International Film Festival.

== Premise ==
Set in 1950s New Jersey, two promising young American football players face the choice between pursuing a sporting career or a life as part of the local mob.

== Cast ==
- Chazz Palminteri
- Robert Davi
- Dante Palminteri
- Nick Davi
- Rob Gronkowski
- Sistine Stallone
- Mischa Barton
- Robert Picardo
- Cerina Vincent
- Federico Castelluccio
- Vincent Pastore
- Ed Marinaro
- John Fiore
- Charlie Tacker
- Kea Ho
- Rob Goon
- Sully Erna

== Production ==
The film is directed by Tom DeNucci and has a script from DeNucci and Joe Cervasio based on the semi-autobiographical novel of the same name by Cervasio. It is from Verdi Productions and is produced by Chad A. Verdi alongside Michelle Verdi, Chad Verdi Jr., Paul Luba, and Sera Verdi.

The cast is led by Chazz Palminteri and Robert Davi and their real-life sons Dante Palminteri and Nick Davi. Other cast members include Rob Gronkowski, Sistine Stallone, Mischa Barton, Robert Picardo, Cerina Vincent, Federico Castelluccio, Vincent Pastore, Ed Marinaro, John Fiore, Kea Ho, Rob Goon, Sully Erna.

Principal photography was completed in May 2025 and took place in and around Providence, Rhode Island.

== Release ==
The film premiered on August 8, 2026 at the Rhode Island International Film Festival.
