= Cyberstalker (film) =

2012 television film

- Written by: Chris Lancey; Arthur Vandelay
- Directed by: Curtis Crawford
- Starring: Mischa Barton; Ron Lea; Dan Levy; Marco Grazzini; Natalie Brown
- Countries of origin: United States; Canada
- Original language: English

Production
- Producer: Neil Bregman
- Cinematography: Bill St. John
- Editor: Devon Allistone
- Running time: 92 minutes

Original release
- Network: Lifetime Movie Network
- Release: 14 September 2012

Cyberstalker (a.k.a. Offline) is a 2012 Lifetime television thriller directed by Curtis Crawford and starring Mischa Barton. Barton portrays a young artist living in seclusion after her parents were murdered by her stalker thirteen years prior; this peace is suddenly disturbed by his reappearance. On 10 July 2012, a trailer was released. It was televised in the United States on 14 September 2012.

== Plot ==
Aiden Ashley's life is torn apart thirteen years ago, when an online stalker tracks down her home and murders her parents. The stalker fled the crime scene without revealing his face to Aiden.

As a consequence, she shuns the Internet for the next thirteen years, attending therapy sessions and living in seclusion. She breaks this life situation after her friend and art dealer, Winton Cornelis, convinces her to hold a public art gala showcasing her own work. The event marks a significant turn in her life when she becomes romantically involved with a guest, Paul Rogers.

Meanwhile, Detective James Page continues to investigate the case of Aiden's parents' murder and recent cyber-stalking. Page hires cyber-security whiz Jack Dayton to research Aiden's life. Dayton makes the discovery that her stalker is still at large, following her undetected, and installing hidden cameras in her home.

Suspicion turns to Aiden's art dealer, with the discovery of financial transactions to his bank accounts from hers. Aiden's love interest Paul's troubled past is also revealed. Detective Page's own involvement appears curious, as he is the only one meticulously following a cold case after thirteen years. As things progress, Aiden's stalker becomes more desperate to be a part of her life while she is determined not to let him blow her life apart again.

Eventually, Jack Dayton is revealed to be the stalker and murderer of Aiden's parents, and in an ensuing confrontation, Aiden denounces Dayton for his actions and rejects his love, breaking his heart, and Dayton is ultimately shot dead by Detective Page.

== Cast ==
- Mischa Barton as Aiden Ashley
- Ron Lea as Detective Page
- Dan Levy as Jack Dayton/Mysterious Man
- Marco Grazzini as Paul Rogers
- Natalie Brown as Jill Gachet
- Peter Dillon as Detective Bonham
- Mark Caven as Winton Cornelis
- Chantal Quesnel as Michelle Ashley
- Kevin Jubinville as Shamus Ashley

== Production ==
Filming on the project began on 15 June 2011 in Ottawa, Ontario, Canada and was completed in three weeks.
