= Murder at the Embassy =

2025 American murder mystery film

- Theatrical release poster
- Directed by: Stephen Shimek
- Screenplay by: Mark Brennan
- Story by: Alexandra Davison
- Produced by: Sara Huxley; April Kelley; Brian Vilim; Zeus Zamani
- Starring: Mischa Barton; Mido Hamada; Kojo Attah; Nell Barlow; Raha Rahbari; Antonia Bernath; Richard Dillane
- Cinematography: Brian Vilim
- Edited by: Matthew Jensen
- Music by: Christian Davis
- Production companies: ACE Entertainment; Mini Productions
- Distributed by: Lionsgate
- Release date: November 14, 2025
- Running time: 84 minutes
- Country: United States
- Language: English

Murder at the Embassy is a 2025 American murder mystery film directed by Stephen Shimek and starring Mischa Barton, Mido Hamada, Kojo Attah, Nell Barlow, Raha Rahbari, Antonia Bernath, and Richard Dillane. It serves as the sequel to Invitation to a Murder (2023).

Murder at the Embassy was released in the United States on November 14, 2025.

== Premise ==
In 1934, private detective Miranda Green leaves England for Egypt. She must investigate a murder perpetrated in a supposedly inviolable place: the British Embassy in Cairo, where a top secret document was stolen the same night.

== Cast ==
- Mischa Barton as Miranda Green
- Mido Hamada as Mamoud
- Kojo Attah as Walter
- Nell Barlow as Meghan
- Raha Rahbari as Leila
- Antonia Bernath as Betty
- Richard Dillane as Robert

== Production ==
In May 2024, it was revealed that the sequel to Invitation to a Murder (2023) was in production, with Mischa Barton reprising her role as Miranda Green.

== Release ==
Murder at the Embassy was released in the United States on November 14, 2025.
