= The Wives of Bath =

Novel by Susan Swan

The Wives Of Bath
- Cover art for 1993 Knopf hardcover edition
- Author: Susan Swan
- Cover artist: Chip Kidd (designer)
- Language: English
- Genre: Novel
- Publisher: Knopf Canada (Canada), Alfred A. Knopf (US), Granta (UK)
- Publication date: 1993
- Publication place: Canada
- Media type: Print (Hardback & Paperback)
- Pages: 237 pp (Canada)
- ISBN: 0-394-28006-7 (Canada)
- OCLC: 28022236
- Preceded by: The Last of the Golden Girls
- Followed by: What Casanova Told Me

The Wives of Bath is a novel by Susan Swan, inspired by her own childhood experiences at Havergal College in Toronto, Ontario, Canada.

== Plot introduction ==
In late 1963, Mary 'Mouse' Bradford is sent to boarding school by her unsympathetic father and jealous stepmother. There, she meets the rebellious Paulie, and together they embark upon a quest to discover what, fundamentally, separates men from women.

== Explanation of the novel's title ==
In Swan's own words, "... the teachers and matrons of the boarding school remind [Mouse] of Chaucer's Wife of Bath because they are the only women she has met who live by their own rules. Yet even their power is limited, and Mouse concludes near the end of the novel:

We were all Wives of Bath – from the teachers who terrorized us with their bells and gatings to the overfed boarders and snobby day girls..but no matter how hard any of us struggled...Bath Ladies College was only a fiefdom in the kingdom of men.

— The Wives of Bath

== Plot summary ==
=== Part one ===
Mouse introduces herself, and mentions her involvement in Paulie's "weird, Napoleonic act of self-assertion", though she does not specify exactly what it was that Paulie did, or even who she is. Mouse speaks of her distracted father, Morley, and her critical stepmother, Sal. She also tells the reader of the hump she has in her left shoulder as a result of a childhood bout of polio, which developed into kyphosis. Mouse has named the hump Alice, after her dead mother, and says that the hump is like a friend to her. Throughout the novel, Mouse's conversations with Alice provide comic relief and exposition on the story's dark events. In the second chapter, Mouse pauses the narrative and recounts details from Paulie's trial, something she continues to do sporadically throughout the novel. It emerges that Paulie committed a murder of some kind.

Mouse recalls how she was sent to the boarding school in Toronto- Bath Ladies' College- because her father had "an unfortunate inferiority complex about bringing up females" and because its headmistress, Vera Vaughan, was a distant cousin of Morley's. Mouse is nervous, keenly aware of her shyness and her physical shortcomings, and is bewildered by the strange atmosphere of the old-fashioned school. She meets the friendly janitor, Sergeant (who is a dwarf), and Paulie's brother, Lewis, whom she later catches shaving in her new dorm bathroom. Mouse meets Tory and Paulie that evening, immediately warming to the friendly Tory and taken aback by Paulie's brash manner. It is clear that, different as they are, the two have a very close friendship. Tory tells Mouse that Paulie's brother, Lewis, is her boyfriend, and that they are in love.

Mouse settles quickly, but not comfortably, into the school, picking up the lexicon and the consensus regarding the staff of the school amongst the students. The intensity of her fixation with John F. Kennedy is evident in the long, familiar letters that she sends him on a regular basis.

To both Mouse and Paulie's chagrin, Tory breaks her leg in a field hockey accident and is sent home for the rest of the winter term. Tiring of Paulie's volatile behaviour, Miss Vaughan orders Paulie to 'walk off' her frustrations at the school every evening after class, and assigns Mouse to accompany her. The two form a kind of bond, and Paulie soon reveals to Mouse that she doesn't have a brother named Lewis; it is actually her, masquerading as a boy, and that she has everyone fooled, even Tory. She takes Mouse to the shrine she has made to the 1933 film King Kong, and sets Mouse a series of bizarre tests to prove that she, too, can 'be' a boy. These include: eating six bowls of tapioca pudding without vomiting, letting a match burn to the skin without crying, and managing to urinate whilst standing up.

After Mouse completes these 'preliminaries', she embarks upon three major tests: mastery over other men, mastery over women and mastery over nature; in the first, Mouse creates her male alter-ego 'Nick the Greek', and dresses as a boy for the first time. Mouse and Paulie pick a fight with boys from the nearby King's College, one of whom is Tory's elder brother, Rick. In the second, Paulie challenges Mouse to seduce an overweight girl from the local convent school, which she does, though the outcome borders on comical; the girl in question, Josie, is found to have known all along that 'Nick' was a girl, and bursts into tears when Mouse hesitates to caress her. In the third test, Paulie challenges Mouse to kill a pigeon.

Mouse's reluctance to do these tasks emphasises that her wish to be a man is not founded on a genuine desire to become one, or even on an attraction to girls. Rather, Mouse longs for the freedom that the men of the time enjoyed, which she believes she will never be able to experience as a woman.

In Tory's absence, teacher's pet Ismay Thom moves into Mouse and Paulie's dorm room. Her pushy presence aggravates Paulie, but Mouse warms to Ismay's eccentric but likeable character.

Paulie leads Mouse in a break-in to Mrs Peddie's private quarters, where they stumble upon correspondence between Miss Vaughan and Mrs Peddie, written years before. The letters detail an incident in which Miss Vaughan was assaulted by a police officer, who had seen her kissing Mrs Peddie. Paulie steals them, and hides them in Mouse's bedside drawer. When Mouse checks on them in the morning, they have disappeared.

In Tory's absence, Paulie's behaviour worsens, and she is banned from attending the Visitor's Luncheon at King's College. Mouse is taken there by her Uncle Winnie (her mother's brother) and his wife. Whilst there, she sees Tory with Lewis in the yard outside. Lewis is chased from the school, after being seen vandalising a statue. Amidst the uproar, the news is broken that President Kennedy has been assassinated.

Mouse is devastated by the news of the President's death, but is cheered by letters from Jack O'Malley, a King's College student she met at the Luncheon. Paulie's behaviour becomes increasingly sinister; she instructs Mouse to beat her with an old cane, and when she hesitates, Paulie beats her with it instead, hard enough to draw blood. Mouse admits that she continued to go along with Paulie's tests because Paulie's evil character absolves her of all the things in her life that she cannot change (i.e., not being worthy of Morley's love, not having any friends) and makes her even more innocent.

After performing in the Christmas show, Mouse is summoned to Miss Vaughan's office, where she is told that Morley has died from a sudden heart attack.

=== Part two ===
Mouse returns to her home in Madoc's Landing to bury her father. Though she seems cold and distant to the reality of his death, it is obvious that she is devastated. Her stepmother Sal, who is frequently heard as Mouse's voice of conscience, is revealed to be an alcoholic. Miss Vaughan attends the funeral, bringing Paulie, who tells Mouse that Rick is trying to stop Tory from seeing Lewis. Miss Vaughan asks Mouse to keep what she has discovered in her and Mrs Peddie's letters to herself.

Mouse resolves to never dress as a boy again, and meditates on her father's lack of affection for her. She concludes that he loved his work too much. Mouse returns to Bath College with keepsakes of his, one of them being a book on anatomy (he was a surgeon) and his old doctor's bag.

=== Part three ===
On returning to school, Mouse discovers that Paulie has been removed from her dorm room, replaced by Asa Abrams, and that Tory has returned. To her surprise, she receives quiet sympathy from her peers as well as her teachers, and is particularly touched by Tory's gift of a New Testament bible. Paulie has been forced to take Asa's old cubicle. Her exile makes her noticeably friendlier to Mouse. Paulie discloses that she (as Lewis) got into a fight with Rick and injured him with a knife, and that Tory was upset with her for doing it. Ismay tells Mouse that Paulie has been carving lurid stick figures on her bedstead and stealing her music scores, which Paulie laughingly denies.

Lewis drives Mouse to King's College on the evening of the Christmas dance, to pick up Jack O'Malley. The two make awkward conversation as Lewis drives to Canon Quinn's house to pick Tory up. Mouse sees Rick and Lewis arguing and scuffling at the door of the Quinns' house; Lewis returns to the van noticeably upset and without Tory. Once alone, Lewis reveals to Mouse that Rick had challenged Lewis to prove he was a boy by showing him his penis, and begins to cry.

Mouse eventually leaves Paulie, and joins Jack inside. They become involved in the festivities, drinking gin and "fooling around for the longest time standing up". Toward the end of the evening, Mouse breaks away and searches for Paulie, finally finding her in the tower washroom, her hair shorn and her face cut and bleeding. Paulie angrily brushes Mouse away when she tries to comfort her, and says that she's not giving up on Tory. They are distracted by Sergeant, who has dressed up as the school's dead founder, Miss Higgs, for the evening, and is tearing round the school on an antiquated Victorian bicycle. The girls try to follow him, but Mouse loses Paulie in the darkness. She looks for her in her room, and discovers Ismay's musical scores in there, along with pages ripped from her father's Gray's Anatomy; the pages depict the male penis, and have been annotated by Paulie. Tired, and tipsy from the alcohol Jack gave her, Mouse goes to bed.

Mouse wakes early the next morning and, worried by Paulie's prolonged absence, goes to look for her in the tunnels beneath the school. She finds Paulie distressed, saying that Sergeant has fallen against one of the heating pipes and hurt himself. She takes Mouse to his prone body, then sends her to get the Czech groundskeeper, Willy. Sergeant is unconscious, and badly burned from falling against the scalding pipes. When Mouse returns with him, she finds Sergeant dead, and Paulie gone. Remembering what she found the evening before, a horrified Mouse suspects what Paulie has done. Lifting his costume skirts, Mouse sees that Sergeant has been castrated.

Mouse recalls details from Paulie's trial, and informs the reader what happened next; after removing Sergeant's genitals with one of Morley's scalpels, Paulie had stuck them to herself with tire glue, and presented herself to Rick Quinn in her chilling garb. She was arrested shortly after, and found to be too mentally unstable to take full responsibility for her actions; eluding jail, Paulie was sent to a mental institution for "rehabilitation". Tory was sent to another school (though the court heard that she continued to see Paulie whilst she was in custody), and Mouse was sent home to Madoc's Landing until the furor over her involvement in Paulie's crime had died down. She recalls a dream she had about Sergeant after his memorial service, and says she's glad that he didn't know it was not his friend Lewis who had killed him, but Paulie.

Now sixteen, Mouse looks back on her time at Bath's College, crediting the girls and women there who inspired her to be herself, and signs herself off as 'M.B.'

== Characters in The Wives of Bath ==
=== Main characters ===
==== Mary Beatrice 'Mouse' Bradford ====
Deep-thinking, shy and intelligent. Mouse's adoration of her father, Morley, and her idolization of John F. Kennedy suggests that she, like Paulie, longs for the freedom and status of becoming a man. However, when presented with confrontational situations that test her 'masculinity', Mouse's 'feminine' instincts (i.e. passivity, fear and obedience) take precedence.

==== Pauline 'Paulie' Sykes/Lewis ====
Rebellious, troubled and wild. Paulie resents the status females have been given by society, and constantly challenges one to consider exactly what it is that makes a man characteristically 'masculine', (i.e. strong, self-assured, and resourceful). Paulie finds a freedom in masquerading as a boy. Though mainly unsympathetic and at times even violent toward Mouse, Paulie harbours an idealistic and devoted love for Tory. The horrific murder Paulie commits at the climax of the novel acts as the dénouement for the story.

==== Victoria 'Tory' Quinn ====
Kind, beautiful and vulnerable, Tory could be described as being acceptably 'feminine'. Though not as subversive as Paulie, Tory is rebellious in her own way. She frequently breaks school rules, and does not respond seriously to discipline when she doesn't manage to evade it. Most importantly, the nature of her relationship with Paulie prevents her from being described as a typical girl of the time. Mouse questions, toward the end of the novel, whether Tory was aware that Lewis and Paulie were the same person; there is evidence for both arguments, but the intensity of their relationship suggests that she was.

=== Other characters ===
- Vera 'The Virgin' Vaughan
- Mrs Peddie
- Morley Bradford
- Sal Bradford
- Sergeant
- Richard 'Rick' Quinn
- Ismay Thom

== Major themes, symbols and motifs ==
- Gender issues and stereotypes
- Repressive atmosphere of the 1960s
- Forbidden love
- Freudian/Psychoanalytic theories of sexuality and gender identity
- King Kong as a masculine hero

== Allusions/references to other works/events ==
- Geoffrey Chaucer's The Wife of Bath
- Charlotte Brontë's criticism of Jane Austen
- The character and suicide of Virginia Woolf
- The assassination of President John F. Kennedy
- The Holocaust
- MacDonald Triad

== Awards and nominations ==
- Shortlisted for the 1993 Guardian Fiction Award
- Shortlisted for the 1993 Trillium Award
- Winner of the 1993 Toronto Arts Council Award for Fiction

== Film, TV or theatrical adaptations ==
The Wives of Bath was made into the independent film Lost and Delirious in 2001, directed by Léa Pool and adapted for the screen by Judith Thompson. The Film stars Piper Perabo as Paulie, Jessica Paré as Tory, and a young Mischa Barton as Mouse.

Susan Swan has recently written a foreword for the new edition of The Wives of Bath praising Lost and Delirious, though she states that it is, superficially, "vastly different" from the original novel. The film was listed in the Official Selection for the Sundance Film Festival in 2001.

The last names of the main characters differ in Lost and Delirious to those in The Wives of Bath; Paulie's was changed from "Sykes" to "Oster"; Tory's from "Quinn" to "Moller"; and Mouse's from "Bradford" to "Bedford".

The murder that serves as the dénouement for the story was not included in the Lost and Delirious screenplay by Judith Thompson, who felt that the grotesque nature of Paulie's crime would not translate properly on-screen. Instead, the film ends with the character of Paulie committing suicide.
