= Stalled =

2013 film

- Poster
- Directed by: Christian James
- Written by: Dan Palmer
- Produced by: Richard Kerrigan; Daniel Pickering
- Starring: Dan Palmer; Chris R. Wright; Mark Holden; Marcus Kelly; Russell Biles; Antonia Bernath
- Cinematography: Sashi Kissoon
- Edited by: Mark Gilleece
- Music by: Adam Langston
- Production company: Cubicle Hero
- Release date: 19 July 2013 (Puchon International Fantastic Film Festival)
- Running time: 84 minutes
- Country: United Kingdom
- Language: English

Stalled is a 2013 British zombie comedy film directed by Christian James. It stars Dan Palmer, who also wrote the screenplay, as a man confined to a bathroom stall after zombies attack. Produced by Richard Kerrigan and Daniel Pickering, the film's cast also includes Mark Holden and Antonia Bernath. It has been screened at several film prior to its release.

== Premise ==
On Christmas Eve, office maintenance worker W. C. (Dan Palmer) attempts to avoid being eaten by zombies after he becomes trapped in a woman's toilet cubicle during the zombie apocalypse.He must rely on his wits, his toolbox and the stall room walls to keep him alive while figuring out a way to survive and escape this dire situation.

== Production ==
The film was directed by Christian James. Dan Palmer, who wrote the film's screenplay, starred as W. C. in the film, with Mark Holden and Antonia Bernath co-starring. The cast also includes Giles Anderson, Sarah Biggins, and Victoria Bloom. The film's production company was Cubicle Hero. Richard Kerrigan served as producer. Sashi Kissoon did cinematography and Mark Gilleece edited the film.

== Reception ==
Stalled has received positive reviews. Kim Newman of Screendaily wrote that Stalled "is a worthy successor to Shaun of the Dead and Harold's Going Stiff in its mix of homage to past zombie film glories and very British social comedy." Scott A. Grey of Exclaim! praised Stalled and considered it "a welcome addition to the limited pantheon of successful zombie comedies." A writer for Ain't It Cool News opined that "the zom-com has been tried before, but very few of these films are as successful at being entertaining as Stalled is."

Edward Boff, writing for Film Juice, gave Stalled four stars out of five, writing that "Just the right mix of thrills, gore, laughs and genuinely touching character moments, using the very limited location to the fullest." Todd Brown, writing for Twitch Film, considered the film "proof that sometimes all you need to sell a movie is a good concept" and that it was "just pretty damn funny".

== Release ==
Stalled premiered at the London FrightFest Film Festival on 24 August 2013. Stalled also screened at PiFan and at the Lund International Fantastic Film Festival, where it won the "Feature Film Méliès d'Argent" award. The film screened on 14 November 2013 at the Prince Charles Cinema, where the filmmakers will attend and give away props from the film. The DVD was released in 2014.
