= One Brief Summer =

1971 British film by John Mackenzie

- Original British quad poster
- Directed by: John Mackenzie
- Written by: Wendy Marshall
- Story by: Guido Cohen; Harry Tierney
- Based on: play Valkyrie's Armour by Harry Tierney
- Produced by: Guido Coen
- Starring: Clifford Evans; Peter Egan; Jennifer Hilary; Felicity Gibson
- Cinematography: David MacDonald
- Edited by: John Colville
- Music by: Roger Webb
- Production company: Twickenham Film Associates
- Distributed by: Twentieth Century Fox Film Company (UK); Cine vision (US)
- Release dates: February 1971 (UK); 1972 (US)
- Running time: 86 minutes
- Country: United Kingdom
- Language: English

One Brief Summer is a 1971 British drama film directed by John Mackenzie, the first feature film he directed. It stars Felicity Gibson and Clifford Evans. The British Film Institute called it "one of many '60s films to explore a relationship between a middle-aged man and a young woman".

== Plot ==
Mark Stevens, a divorced wealthy businessman, has a mistress, Elizabeth, and lives with his adult daughter, Jennifer. They are visited by Susan, a friend of Jennifer's. Susan and Mark fall in love and get married, upsetting Jennifer. Susan begins an affair with a younger man, Bill Denton, and leaves Mark to be with him.

== Cast ==
- Felicity Gibson as Susan Long
- Clifford Evans as Mark Stevens
- Jennifer Hilary as Jennifer
- Peter Egan as Bill Denton
- Jan Holden as Elizabeth
- Fanny Carby as Mrs. Shaw
- Richard Vernon as Hayward
- Helen Lindsay as Mrs. Hayward
- Basil Moss as John Robertson
- David Leland as Peter
- Brian Wilde as Lambert
- Lockwood West as Ebert
- Carolyn Seymour as Mark's secretary

== Production ==
The film was based on an unproduced play by Harry Tierney. He met producer Guido Coen (who made Baby Love (1969) and Penthouse (1967)) and they formed a partnership to make the film. Peter Egan was best known for the 1969 TV series Big Breadwinner Hog and Clifford Evans for The Power Game (TV series 1965–1969).

Filming began in August 1969 at Twickenham Studios and mostly took place in and around a country house in Hildenborough, Kent, belonging to diamond millionaire Richard Harris. Felicity Gibson was the niece of Guy Gibson and it was her first film; she had a nude scene.

== Reception ==
The Monthly Film Bulletin wrote: "Glum intimations of upper-bracket incest (plus a wisp of lesbianism) permeate this story of the kitten showing her claws. John Mackenzie, whose direction is redolent of his TV training, proves to be too easily swayed by the picturesque qualities of the estate and the summer countryside. His style is smooth and confident, but the script, whose downbeat emphasis somehow suggests that incest is an everyday family problem, needed a spark of real individuality to set it off, and that is precisely what One Brief Summer lacks."

The Guardian rated the story as "pretty absurd" but commented that the "careful, very professional direction and some expert playing... give this an edge the story scarcely deserves."

The Evening Standard called it "a Francois Sagan-type story... given added subtlety" by its script and acting. "More a feeling of what a film is about than many a more imposing production.

Variety dubbed it a "slightweight piece".

The New York Times called it "a rambling, tedious bore" despite good direction and acting, where "once the friction surfaces, the film goes nowhere, leaving the cast to mill around and stare at one another in disillusion, lust or both."
