= Twelve Dreams =

1981 play by James Lapine

- Original language: English
- Written by: James Lapine
- Characters: Charles Hatrick; Emma Hatrick; Jenny; Professor
- Genre: Drama

Premiere
- Date: December 22, 1981
- Place: The Public Theater, New York City, New York

Twelve Dreams is a 1981 play by James Lapine that was inspired by a case study contained in Carl Jung's 1964 book Man and His Symbols. The case concerns a 10-year-old girl who gave her father, a psychiatrist, an unusual Christmas present—a handwritten booklet describing twelve dreams that she had had when she was eight years old.

The play was first performed as a work-in-progress in 1978. A more complete version was performed in 1981–1982, and it was revived in 1995.

== Plot ==
Set in 1936-37 in a New England university town, Emma presents her practicing psychiatrist and lecturer father with a Christmas gift, a handwritten collection detailing 12 of her dreams.

Charles struggles to make sense of the dreams, torn between his role as father and psychiatrist. He enlists the help of a visiting European psychiatrist. The professor is intrigued by the dreams, remarking that they are those of an older person facing their mortality. Interspersed in Emma's dreams are real-life figures such as her best friend, Jenny, Rindy, a neurotic patient of her father's, her ballet teacher, Miss Banton as well as Sanford, her father's apprentice.

== Productions ==
The play premiered at The Public Theater in New York City, New York on 22 December 1981 and ended on 31 January 1982.

=== Off-Broadway (1981–1982) ===
Cast

- James Olson as Charles Hatrick
- Olivia Laurel Mates as Emma Hatrick
- Marcel Rosenblatt as Jenny
- Stefan Schnabel as Professor Jan Rubeš
- Thomas Hulce as Sanford Putnam
- Carole Shelley as Dorothy Trowbridge
- Valerie Mahaffey as Miss Banton
- Stacy Glick as Rindy

=== Off-Broadway revival (1995) ===
The revival premiered at the Mitzi E. Newhouse Theater at the Lincoln Center on 11 May 1995 and ended on 6 August 1995. Lapine was the director.

Cast

- Harry Groener as Charles Hatrick
- Mischa Barton as Emma Hatrick
- Kathleen Chalfant as Jenny
- Jan Rubeš as Professor
- Matt Ross as Sanford Putnam
- Donna Murphy as Dorothy Trowbridge
- Meg Howrey as Miss Banton
- Brittany Boyd as Rindy

Crew

- Original music by Allen Shawn
- Choreography by Lar Lubovitch
- Set design by Adrianne Lobel
- Costume designs by Martin Pakledinaz
- Lighting by Peter Kaczorowski

== Reception ==
Vincent Canby gave the 1995 revival a favorable review in The New York Times, saying that Barton "has a sweet gravity as the doomed Emma," as well as affirming that:

Mr. Lapine has produced an elaborate theatrical meditation on Jung's work in which Emma, Charles, the Professor and all the other characters in the play behave like people in a case history. Everybody is reduced to symptoms. No character has more reality than any of the phantoms that inhabit Emma's dreams, which, with a good deal of directorial skill, are woven into the play's action.

Variety reviewed the 1995 revival and were unanimous in their support of the "extraordinary" play, "The company, perfectly cast underplays admirably. The result is itself a riveting dream which, for all its unsettling animal imagery, never loses its focus on the people at its core; it's an enormously empathic evening."

Brad Leithauser of Time wrote that Lapine "does an adroit job of interweaving day event and night-revelation." He continues:

The dream sequences are spookily compelling and splendidly differentiated. The play has the true fierceness of dream logic - the sense that you are watching events that unfold that are both unpredictable and ineluctable. Five musicians pilot us from one real to the other, artfully building towards songs that never emerge.

=== Awards ===
Carole Shelley won an Obie Award in 1982 for her performance in the 1981-82 production.
