= Mark Holden (actor) =

British-born Canadian actor

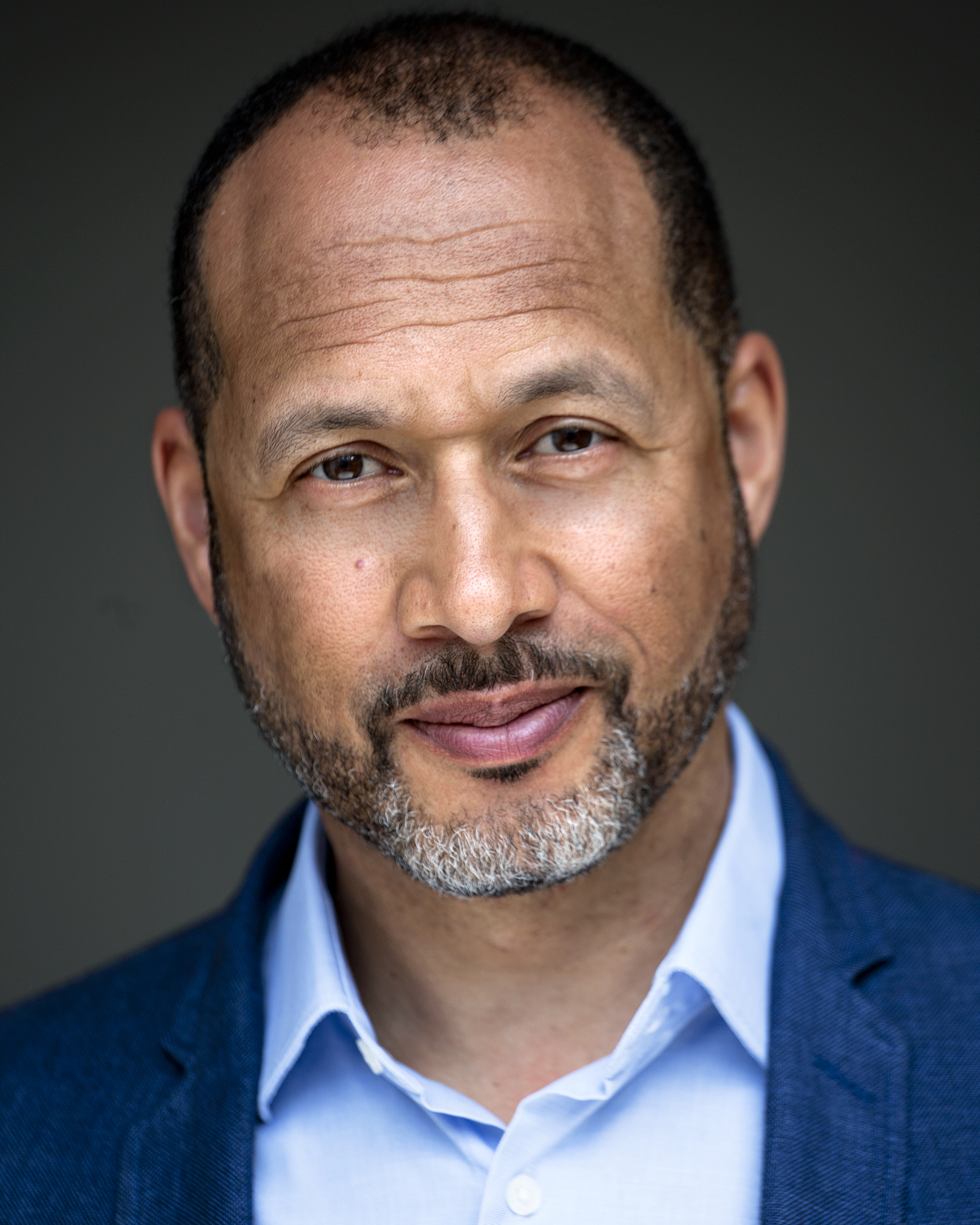
- Born: Mark Adrian Cortis; 21 September 1962 (age 64); Plymouth, England
- Citizenship: United Kingdom; Canada; Nigeria
- Occupations: Actor, voice actor, producer
- Years active: 1991–present
- Spouse: Patsy McKay (m. 2008)
- Children: 4
- Father: Augustus Aikhomu

Mark Adrian Holden-Aikhomu (né Cortis; 21 September 1962) is a British-born Canadian actor of Nigerian descent, who works in film, television, theatre and voice. He is best known for playing CIA handler John Lynn in the Fox Networks Group television series Deep State and playing James Morse on stage in the original London cast of Pretty Woman: The Musical at the Savoy Theatre in the West End. Most recently his voice can be heard playing Doctor Paradox in the 2020 video game Cyberpunk 2077, developed by CD Projekt, and playing Nikolas in another eagerly awaited video game Dying Light 2: Stay Human developed by Techland.

== Career ==
In his late 20s, Holden began his acting career, and was cast as Villac Umu in 1992 in The Royal Hunt of the Sun by the late Robin Phillips, Director General at the Citadel Theatre in Edmonton, Alberta, Canada. He was cast in a further six productions over the next three years at the Citadel Theatre, La Bête, Wait Until Dark, Oliver!, Macbeth, Caesar and Cleopatra and The Cherry Orchard.

Holden's film credits include World War Z, Bang Bang You're Dead, The Infiltrator, Stalled and Final Destination. He played William Rios in the 2013 biographical drama-thriller film Captain Phillips, starring Tom Hanks, Barkhad Abdi and Catherine Keener.

In 2014, Holden wrote and produced his own international award-winning short film, called The Double Deal, in which he also starred as the lead character, Matthew Calder, alongside Captain Phillips castmates Vincenzo Nicoli and David Webber. It can be viewed on YouTube.

== Filmography ==
=== Film (selected) ===
Year	Title	Role	Notes
1997	Misbegotten	Captain	
2000	Epicenter	Grant	
2000	Final Destination	Co-Pilot	
2001	Mindstorm	Agent Mark Taft	
2002	Bang Bang You're Dead	Officer Willow	
2002	The Stickup	Roy Freeman	
2006	The Road to Guantanamo	Kandahar Interrogator No. 2	
2009	Knife Edge	Alfred	
2013	Stalled	Jeff From I.T.	
2013	Captain Phillips	William Rios	
2013	World War Z	UN Delegate	
2014	The Double Deal	Matthew Calder	Short film writer/producer
2016	The Infiltrator	Eric Wellman	
2017	The Prince Story: Icon, Genius...Slave	John Lewis Nelson	Docudrama
2018	Mars 1001	Commander Robert McGee	Planetarium Full Dome; Feature
2020	Satori [Awakening]	Warren Rogers	Short film
2021	Override	Mitchell	a.k.a. R.I.A.
2024	Damaged	Captain Ford	
2026	Clayface	Investigator	

=== Television (selected) ===
Year	Title	Role	Notes
1996	Gone in a Heartbeat	Officer Kline	TV movie
1997	All The Winters That Have Been	Deputy Marshall	TV movie
1997	Millennium	Agent Clark	Episode: "The Thin White Line"
1997	The X-Files	Agent Eugene Chandler	Episode: "Unrequited"
1997	Medusa's Child	Bill Andrews	TV movie
1998	Millennium	Amadou	Episode: "Owls"
1999	Cold Squad	Ted Millman	Episode: "The Kowalchuck Boy"
1999	Aftershock: Earthquake in New York	Firefighter Outside Station	Episodes: "Part 1" and "Part 2"
1999	Stargate SG-1	Korra	Episode: "Deadman Switch"
2000	The Inspectors 2: A Shred of Evidence	Hunter	TV movie
2001	Love and Treason	Major Harkey	TV movie
2001	Andromeda	Brother Thaddeus Blake	Episode: "The Devil Take the Hindmost"
2001	MythQuest	Kabaila	Episode: "The Blessing"
2002	Dead in a Heartbeat	Vice Principal	TV movie
2002	Killer Bees	Fire Chief	TV movie
2005	Doctors	Mr Julian Carter	3 episodes
2007	Casualty	Mr. Paolo Santoni	Episode: "The Personal Touch"
2007	Hustle	Bouncer	Episode: "A Designers Paradise"
2014	50 Ways to Kill Your Lover	Dr. Chase	Episode: "Heavy Metal"
2014	24: Live Another Day	CIA Security Guard	Episode: "11:00 a.m.-12:00 p.m."
2018	No Easy Days	Evan Clark	6 episodes
2018	Riviera	Martin Sinclair	Season 2
2018–2019	Deep State	John Lynn (CIA handler)	Seasons 1 & 2
2020	The Show Must Go Online	Aaron/Mark Antony	Episodes: "Titus Andronicus" & "Antony & Cleopatra"
2021	A Discovery of Witches	Wilf	Season 2
2022	His Dark Materials	Customs Officer Alexander	Season 3
2024	Love on the Danube: Love Song	Captain Magnusson	TV movie
2024	Love on the Danube: Royal Getaway	Captain Magnusson	TV movie
2024	Love on the Danube: Kissing Stars	Captain Magnusson	TV movie
2025	Death in Paradise	Damon Clarke	Episode: "#14.1"

=== Theatre (selected) ===
Selected Mark Holden Theater Performances
Year	Title	Role	Venue	Notes
1992	Titus Andronicus	Aaron	Onion Theatre Company, Edmonton AB Canada	Director: Michael Clarke
1992	The Royal Hunt of the Sun	Villac Umu	Citadel Theatre Edmonton, AB Canada	Director: Robin Phillips
1993	La Bête	Servant	Citadel Theatre, Edmonton AB Canada	Director: Robin Phillips
1993	Wait Until Dark	1st Policeman	Citadel Theatre, Edmonton AB Canada	Director: Stephen Heatley
1993	Macbeth	Seyton	Citadel Theatre, Edmonton AB Canada	Director: Robin Phillips
1994	Caesar and Cleopatra	First Porter	Citadel Theatre, Edmonton AB Canada	Director: Robin Phillips
1996	The Merchant of Venice	Prince of Morocco	Bard on the Beach, Vancouver, BC Canada	Director: Douglas Campbell
1996	Much Ado About Nothing	Conrad	Bard on the Beach, Vancouver, BC Canada	Director: Christopher Gaze
1997	Othello	Othello	Way Off Broadway Theatre Company, Edmonton, AB Canada	Michael Wener
2004	Fame	My Myers	UK National Tour	Adam Spiegel Productions
2006	The Jungle Book	Baloo	UK National Tour	The Birmingham Stage Company
2009	The Lion, the Witch and the Wardrobe	Aslan	Palace Theatre, Westcliff-on-Sea, Essex UK	Bruce James Productions
2016	The Bodyguard	Bill Devaney	Dominion Theatre, West End, London UK	West End revival/David Ian & Michael Harrison Entertainment
2021–2023	Pretty Woman: The Musical	James Morse	Piccadilly Theatre & Savoy Theatre, West End, London UK	Original West End cast/Ambassador Theatre Group

=== Video games (selected) ===
Year	Title	Role	Developer
2007	Crysis	US Soldier	Crytek
2010	So Blonde: Back to the Island	Guama	Wizarbox
2013	Killzone: Mercenary	ISA Assault Captain	Guerrilla Games
2016	Homefront: The Revolution	Sidney Cook & James Johnson	Dambuster Studios
2016	Battlefield 1	US Soldier	EA DICE
2016	Galaxy on Fire: Manticore	Kyrrk Tast	Fishlabs
2017	Ghost Recon: Wildlands	Boyer 'Boston' Reed	Ubisoft
2020	Cyberpunk 2077	Doctor Paradox / Various	CD Projekt
2022	Dying Light 2: Stay Human	Nikolas	Techland
2023	RoboCop: Rogue City	The Old Man	Teyon

== Awards and nominations ==
Year	Participation	Film Festival	Category	Nominee	Result
2014	Writer/Producer	International Film Festival of Spirituality, Religion and Visionary	Award of Excellence	The Double Deal	Won
2015	Writer/Producer	I Filmmaker International Film Festival	Special Mention	The Double Deal	Won
2015	Writer/Producer	San Diego Black Film Festival	Best Short Film	The Double Deal	Won
2016	Writer/Producer	Canada International Film Festival	Award of Excellence	The Double Deal	Won
2016	Producer	San Diego Black Film Festival	Best Short Film	Phalure Inc.	Nominated
2016	Producer	San Francisco Black Film Festival	Best Short	Huey & Louis	Nominated
