= Antonia Bernath =

English actress, voiceover artist and singer

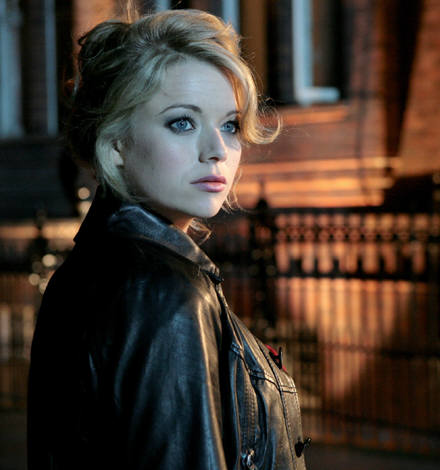
- Bernath in Cuckoo (2009)
- Born: Antonia Geraldine Audrey Lee Bernath; Westminster, London, England
- Education: Bristol Old Vic Theatre School
- Years active: 2003–present
- Spouse: Oliver Cockerham (m. 2015)
- Children: 2

Antonia Geraldine Audrey Lee Bernath is an English actress, voiceover artist and singer. She began her career in the CBS series Elvis (2005) and the Bollywood film Kisna: The Warrior Poet (2005). She then starred in the films St Trinians (2007), Cuckoo (2009), and the ITV2 drama Trinity (2009). She had recurring roles in the ABC series The Astronaut Wives Club (2015) and the final series of Downton Abbey (2015). After a break, Bernath returned to television with the ITVX miniseries Nolly (2023).

== Early life ==
Bernath was born in London to English-Norwegian mother Sarah and American father Paul. Bernath spent her early childhood in Virginia. Driven by alcoholism, her father was physically and emotionally abusive. Bernath returned to England when she was 11 with her mother, who was diagnosed with cancer and unable to get treatment in the U.S. At 13, her mother died, and Bernath was subsequently brought up in Wiltshire by her maternal grandmother Audrey Goodrich.

Bernath attended Godolphin School in Salisbury and joined the National Youth Music Theatre. She began her studies English literature at Cambridge University, but changed her mind and decided to pursue acting. She graduated from Bristol Old Vic Theatre School on a scholarship.

== Career ==
Bernath was the face of Johnson and Johnson Clean and Clear facewash for an International Campaign. She made her television debut in the 2003 Hogmanay special episode of Monarch of the Glen as Becky Body. She appeared in a 2004 installment of the anthology The Afternoon Play on BBC One.

In 2005, Bernath made her feature film debut in Kisna: The Warrior Poet as Katherine Beckett, making her one of the first leading British actresses in a Bollywood film. A Hindustan Times review declared her performance "good" and "cutely pleasing". That same year, she portrayed Priscilla Presley in the CBS miniseries Elvis (2005) alongside Jonathan Rhys Meyers, Randy Quaid and Robert Patrick. Her further television roles include portraying Lucy Bellham in Heartbeat, and Nikki Brown, a semi-regular, in Holby City.

Bernath went on to appear in the film St Trinian's in 2007, as posh totty Chloe, and can also be seen playing the Weather Girl for Radio Sunshine, in the Richard Curtis film The Boat That Rocked. She played a leading role, Charlotte Arc, in the 2009 ITV2 drama Trinity. alongside Charles Dance, Claire Skinner, and Reggie Yates. A review in The Morton Report described her performance in Trinity as "consistently strong".

Bernath was cast as jealous sister Jimi in British thriller film Cuckoo, co-starring Richard E. Grant and Laura Fraser. In 2012, Bernath appeared in Chariots of Fire on the West End, a stage adaptation of the film of the same title, as Florence Mackenzie, the fiancée of Eric Liddell (Jack Lowden). Bernath starred in the 2013 comedy films Stalled and Powder Room, the latter alongside Sheridan Smith. In 2015, she had recurring roles as Susan Borman, wife of astronaut Frank Borman, in the ABC period drama The Astronaut Wives Club and Laura Edmunds in the final season of Downton Abbey on ITV.

In video games, Bernath voiced Syanna in The Witcher 3: Wild Hunt – Blood and Wine, an Imperial Commander in Star Wars Battlefront, and as Dr. Emily Pope in Control. Bernath co-starred as Dr. Susan Gibbs in the Fox medical drama pilot Zoobiquity with Kim Raver and Peter Facinelli.

In 2018, Bernath joined 26 other celebrities at Metropolis Studios, to perform an original Christmas song called "Rock With Rudolph", written and produced by Grahame and Jack Corbyn. The song was recorded in aid of Great Ormond Street Hospital and was released digitally through independent record label Saga Entertainment on 30 November 2018 under the artist name The Celebs. The music video debuted exclusively with The Sun on 29 November 2018 and had its first TV showing on Good Morning Britain on 30 November 2018. The song peaked at number two on the iTunes pop chart.

== Personal life ==
Bernath married Oliver Cockerham in 2015. The couple have two children.

== Filmography ==
=== Film ===
| Year | Title | Role | Notes |
|---|---|---|---|
| 2005 | Kisna: The Warrior Poet | Katherine | Debut; Hindi film |
| 2007 | St Trinian's | Chloe | |
| 2009 | Slaughter | Cathy | |
| 2009 | The Boat That Rocked | Katie, Weather Girl | Uncredited |
| 2009 | Goal III: Taking on the World | Britt | Direct-to-video |
| 2009 | Cuckoo | Jimi | |
| 2009 | Old Harry | Mother | Short film |
| 2013 | Stalled | Heather | |
| 2013 | Powder Room | Kim | |
| 2017 | Blue | Ruby | Short film |
| 2017 | Padlock | Other Julie | Short film |
| 2025 | Murder at the Embassy | Betty | |

=== Television ===
| Year | Title | Role | Notes |
|---|---|---|---|
| 2003 | Monarch of the Glen | Becky Body | Hogmanay Special |
| 2004 | The Afternoon Play | Kate Sullivan | Episode: "Sons, Daughters and Lovers" |
| 2005 | Elvis | Priscilla Presley | Miniseries |
| 2006 | Heartbeat | Lucy Bellman | Episode: "Hostage to Fortune" |
| 2004–07 | Holby City | Nikki Brown | 11 episodes |
| 2009 | Trinity | Charlotte Arc | Main role |
| 2012 | Lykke | Kate Dornay | 5 episodes |
| 2014 | Babylon | News Reporter | 2 episodes |
| 2015 | The Astronaut Wives Club | Susan Borman | 5 episodes |
| 2015 | Downton Abbey | Laura Edmunds | 5 episodes (series 6) |
| 2016 | Dickensian | Sally Compeyson | 3 episodes |
| 2016 | Zoobiquity | Dr. Susan Gibbs | Television film |
| 2023 | Nolly | Jane Rossington | Miniseries |
| 2025 | The War Between the Land and the Sea | Rose-Marie Hunt | Miniseries, 3 episodes |
| 2026 | Death in Paradise | Pearl Lewis | Series 15, Episode 6 |

=== Video games ===
| Year | Title | Role | Notes |
|---|---|---|---|
| 2015 | Star Wars Battlefront | Imperial Commander | |
| 2016 | The Witcher 3: Wild Hunt – Blood and Wine | Syanna | |
| 2017 | Star Wars: Battlefront II | | |
| 2018 | Hitman 2 | Sierra Knox | |
| 2019 | Control | Emily Pope | |
| 2020 | Control: The Foundation | Emily Pope | |
| 2020 | Control: AWE | Emily Pope | |
| 2022 | Harvestella | | |
| 2022 | Evil West | Emilia Blackwell | |
| 2026 | Control Resonant | Emily Pope | |

== Stage ==
| Year | Title | Role | Venue | Notes | Ref. |
|---|---|---|---|---|---|
| 2012 | Chariots of Fire | Florence Mackenzie | Gielgud Theatre | West End | |
| 2013 | The Machine | Tamsin | Donmar Warehouse | Manchester International Festival | |
| 2013 | The Machine | Tamsin | Park Avenue Armory Conservancy | Manchester International Festival | |
| 2026 | The Story | Jessica Dunn | Royal National Theatre | West End | |
