= Starcrossed (2014 film) =

- Promotional poster
- Directed by: Chase Mohseni
- Written by: Chase Mohseni
- Starring: Mischa Barton; Eric Roberts; Grant Harvey; Ben Reed; Kristin Carey
- Cinematography: Arden Tse
- Edited by: Danny Daneau
- Music by: Daniel Rojas
- Release date: September 28, 2014
- Running time: 78 mins
- Country: United States
- Language: English

Starcrossed is a 2014 American drama film written and directed by Chase Mohseni. The films stars Mischa Barton, Eric Roberts, Grant Harvey, Ben Reed and Kristin Carey. The film premiered at the San Diego International Film Festival on 28 September 2014. This was followed by a limited theatrical release in Los Angeles in May 2016.

== Plot ==
Ben is a young man who we first see with Lucy, a woman significantly older than him. Telling him she is going away for awhile, she gives him a folded bill. Kat is a similarly young lover to Anthony, the older man she's seeing.

Ben meets Kat one evening, first he prevents her from walking into the path of a car, later he introduces himself in a nearby bar. They get along straight away.

Anthony and Lucy, who are married, by pure coincidence happen to show up at the bar where Kat and Ben have just met. The younger two have a moment by the toilets. Ben suggests they take off, but Kat says she can't, asking him to stay at her side.

Kat suggests the foursome retire back to Anthony and Lucy’s home for drinks, and Lucy suggests she take Ben and that Anthony follow with Kat. The married adulters disappear, the first time in months they are together. Left alone, the young people jump in the pool, tell each other where their corresponding lover is 'keeping them' and then, exploring the house, they have sex in a bedroom.

Meanwhile, after Anthony and Lucy are intimate, he says he loves her, and she treats him with disdain. He gets furious and violent, pushing her around. After she pulls out a gun, he forces it from her, has rough sex with her, throwing money at her on the floor.

Ben leaves, as Kat won't go with him as her son Nathan is revealed to be the boy Anthony and Lucy had adopted. Flashbacks he has of their first meeting compel him to return. He finds Kat in the shadows, gives her his hand in support and they walk back towards the house.

Laz, Anthony's workmate, is there because Lucy had called him. He is told that the couples' corresponding lovers are in the house. When Laz steps outside, seeing Kat, he calls her Kathryn. She's his estranged daughter. When he realises Anthony has been keeping Kat, he punches him.

The younger couple have gone back to the back lawn, where Kat has a gun. Ben makes one more plea to her to go with him, he lunges for the gun, it goes off, cutting to black.

In the final scene, the writer finishes typing the last page of the manuscript, then gets up and stands with his partner, the same we saw as Ben and Kat, and we realise it was just the creation of a writer.

== Cast ==
- Mischa Barton as Kat
- Eric Roberts as Rommel Lazarus
- Grant Harvey as Ben Rawlins
- Ben Reed as Anthony Bishop
- Kristin Carey as Lucy Bishop
- Jonathan Rosenthal as Gerry

== Production ==
Filming took place over 16 days at the end of October 2013. This mostly took place in a former oil baron's mansion in La Cañada Flintridge, California, with additional scenes filmed in Toluca Lake, Los Angeles.

Writer and director, Mohseni was studying for an MFA at Loyola Marymount University and Stacrossed is his thesis.

== Reception ==
Writing in the Los Angeles Times, Katie Walsh explains that "Barton is a standout as the alluring, broken young woman who hides as much as she reveals. Though the younger two symbolize the possibilities for connection, Reed and Carey are a bit more intriguing as the dark, manipulative older couple locked in an erotic competition with each other, exploiting their young lovers." Walsh noted that "The desaturated and moody cinematography pairs with a score of atonal strings and light acoustic guitar to create a sedate nighttime atmosphere." She adds that the film "evokes shades of "Who's Afraid of Virginia Woolf?" amid the intimate revelations and interpersonal twists."
