= Basil Moss =

British actor (1935–2020)

Moss in a guest role in the TV series UFO, 1971

Basil David Moss (25 May 1935 – 28 November 2020) was a British character actor, who featured regularly on television in the 1960s and on radio in the 1970s.

== Early life ==
He was educated at St Paul's School, which he followed with actor's training. Despite leaving St Paul's in 1953, Moss's connections with the school remained strong throughout his life, both through his involvement in the Pauline Meetings and his work for the Old Pauline Club.

== Acting career ==
In the early 1960s, he had a long-running screen role as Alan Drew in the BBC TV series Compact. He later had an even longer-lasting part in the radio soap, Waggoners' Walk, which ran for more than a decade and achieved ratings of four million listeners on Radio Two in the United Kingdom. This grew so popular that it nearly caused the cancellation of The Archers. His credited film roles include appearances in One Brief Summer (1970) and Clinic Exclusive (1971).

As he grew older, Moss did less acting in order to concentrate on other interests, although he continued to appear in comic roles, including The Gigolos.

He died on 28 November 2020, at the age of 85.

== Music ==
Basil played the piano and jazz trumpet and his band, Basil Moss and His Chicago Jazzmen, continued performing until 2014.

== Filmography ==
- I Was Happy Here (1966)
- You Only Live Twice (1967) – British Navy Officer on Submarine (uncredited)
- Doppelgänger (1969) – Monitoring Station Technician (uncredited)
- One Brief Summer (1971) – John Robertson
- Clinic Exclusive (1972) – Philip Eveleigh
- The Gigolos (2006) – Basil
