= The Gigolos =

2005 film by Richard Bracewell

- Theatrical release poster
- Directed by: Richard Bracewell
- Written by: Richard Bracewell; Trevor Sather; Sacha Tarter
- Produced by: Richard Bracewell; Tony Bracewell
- Starring: Sacha Tarter; Trevor Sather; Susannah York; Anna Massey; Ben Willbond
- Cinematography: Richard Bracewell
- Edited by: Craig Cotterill
- Distributed by: Punk Cinema
- Release dates: 23 November 2005 (AFI Fest); 23 March 2007 (United Kingdom)
- Running time: 95 minutes
- Country: United Kingdom
- Language: English

The Gigolos is a 2005 British comedy film directed by Richard Bracewell, starring Sacha Tarter, Trevor Sather and Ben Willbond alongside Susannah York, Anna Massey, Angela Pleasence and Siân Phillips. Bracewell's debut feature, The Gigolos is a buddy movie set in the twilight world of the London male escort.

In 2010, the Daily Telegraph listed The Gigolos as "the most underrated film of all time".

The tag line (according to IMDb) is "Everyone Needs Someone", although UK promotional materials use the quote "A provocative glimpse at open secrets" from The Hollywood Reporter review.

The film was shot on location in London in 2004 and 2005. Bracewell wrote the story with Tarter and Sather, and was also cinematographer. The dialogue was improvised. It premiered at AFI Fest in Hollywood in November 2005. It was released in the UK on 23 March 2007 by Punk Cinema. The British Film Institute released the DVD in the UK on 9 February 2009. Its premiere on network television was on Monday, 20 July 2009 on BBC1.

== Plot ==
The film begins at night with Sacha on a balcony on the south side of the River Thames in London, overlooking Parliament. Sacha smokes while his valet Trevor helps him dress. Sacha leaves the apartment block in his silver Mercedes SL480 (a reference to the Mercedes 450 SL Convertible Richard Gere drives in American Gigolo), crossing Westminster Bridge to a date.

Sacha first meets Joy, an ageing assistant in a publishing company, then Lady James, a powerful government minister. Sacha dines and dates elderly clients (all over 50), sometimes providing something more. Meanwhile, Trevor goes about his business as both Sacha's valet and his pimp, sourcing the clients and booking hotel rooms.

One night, Sacha injures himself "on the job" in a swimming pool, so trains Trevor as his temporary replacement. Trevor is a surprise hit as a gigolo, and the pair go into competition.

== Cast ==
- Sacha Tarter as Sacha: top London gigolo
- Trevor Sather as Trevor: Sacha's faithful valet/pimp
- Siân Phillips as Lady James: a government minister
- Susannah York as Tessa Harrington: a fashion agent
- Angela Pleasence as Joy: a librarian
- Anna Massey as Edwina: an ageing socialite
- Ben Willbond as Ben: a new young gigolo after Sacha's clients

== Locations ==
The Gigolos uses locations in London's West End almost exclusively, especially Westminster, Mayfair, Piccadilly and the South Bank.

== Soundtrack ==
The film mixes classical and popular music, from Mozart's Don Giovanni and the duet "Au fond du Temple Saint" from Bizet's The Pearl Fishers, to Ian Dury and the Blockheads' "Clever Trever", "Sleazy Bed Track" by The Bluetones and "California Dreamin'" by Bobby Womack.

== UK DVD release ==
The British Film Institute released The Gigolos on DVD on 9 February 2009. Extras on the DVD include The Big Idea, a previously unreleased mockumentary about the business world made by Tarter, Sather and Bracewell, and Gigolos Uncovered, a documentary about the making of The Gigolos by New York filmmaker Paul Sullivan.

== Reviews ==
Since its AFI Fest premiere, The Gigolos has received mostly positive reviews, from amongst others the two leading trade magazines. Variety's Derek Elley described the film as "a natural for rep houses and upmarket movie channels" while in The Hollywood Reporter, Sheri Linden wrote it is "an effective slice-of-life portrait of characters".

On its UK release, reviews appeared in major UK newspapers. Sukhdev Sandhu of The Daily Telegraph said that Bracewell "evokes with poetic clarity the loneliness of late-night London." Ian Johns in The Times wrote that "intimate camerawork and scenes moodily capture half-revealed lives". Larushka Ivan-Zadeh in Metro told readers to "seek out this cliché-confounding, utterly intriguing debut Brit flick", adding that this The Gigolos is a "real rough gem". Mike McCahill wrote in The Sunday Telegraph that this is "a disarming debut...that subverts your every expectation with each new scene."

Less positive reviews came from The Guardian and Time Out. Andrew Pulver in The Guardian said the lead actors "manage to raise a few giggles, even if events remain pretty inconsequential." Time Out reviewer David Jenkins complimented parts of the film – there's some "ravishing imagery of central London" – but said the drama "is light on insight."
