= Drew Tyler Bell =

American actor, singer and tap dancer (born 1986)

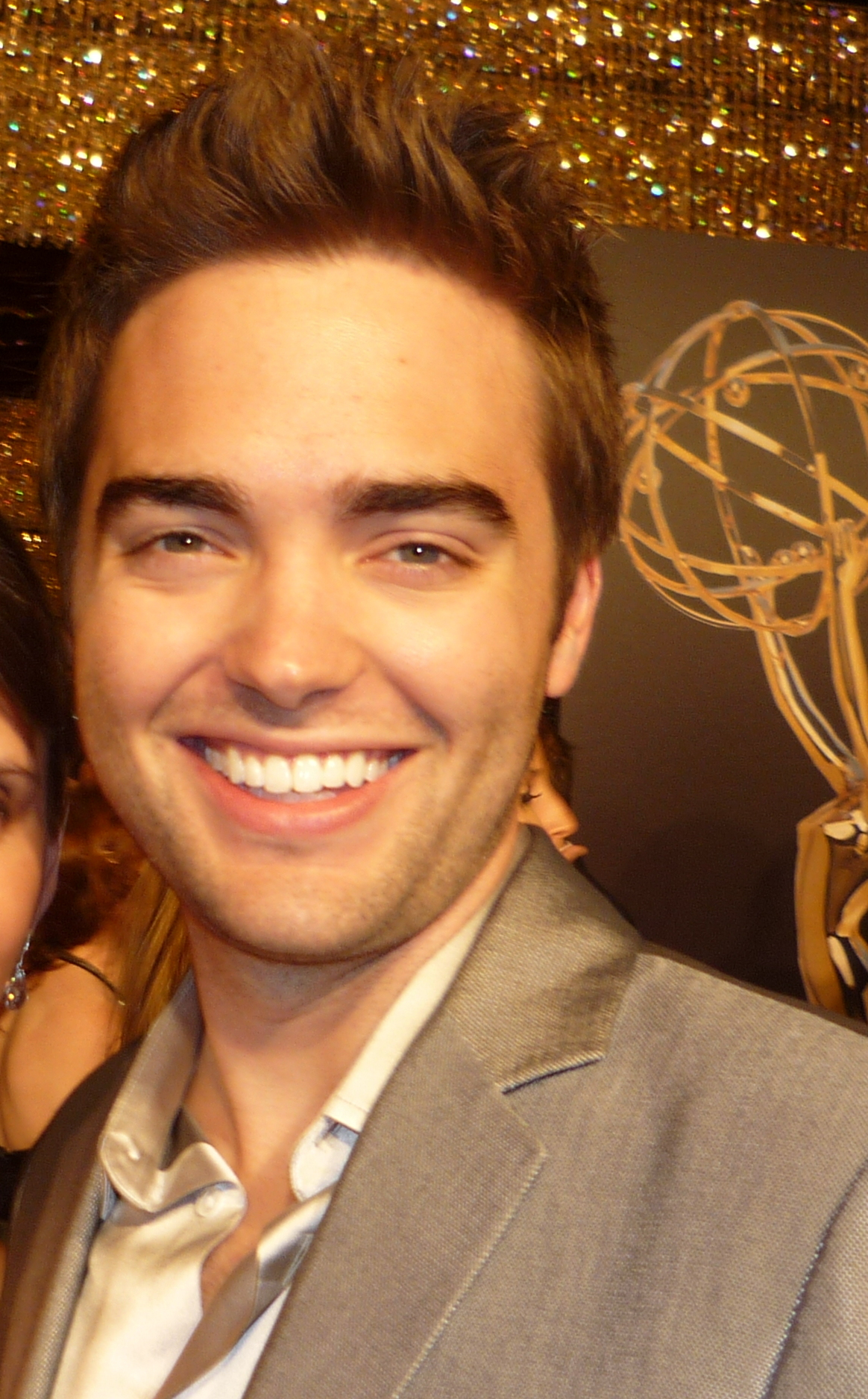
- Bell at the 2010 Daytime Emmy Awards
- Born: January 29, 1986 (age 40)
- Occupations: Actor, singer and tap dancer
- Years active: 2001–2010 (actor and teen idol); 2010–present (singer and tap dancer)

Drew Tyler Bell (born January 29, 1986) is an American retired actor, current singer and tap dancer. He graduated from Barbizon Modeling and Acting School in Akron, Ohio. He also graduated from the David Nazarian College of Business and Economics at California State University, Northridge. He earned an M.B.A. from the Booth School of Business at the University of Chicago. He currently is the Chief Operations Officer of Solis Mammography

== Career ==
Bell is perhaps most known for his role as Thomas Forrester in The Bold and the Beautiful, which he held from 2004 until 2010, for which he won the 2010 Daytime Emmy Award for Outstanding Younger Actor in a Drama Series. He has made other television appearances, including the television series Jake 2.0, Standoff, and Desperate Housewives. He was also in the television movie, Love's Abiding Joy. He has also performed in numerous television commercials.

Bell made his feature film debut in Jeepers Creepers II, which was released in August 2003. He also appeared in The Seeker: The Dark is Rising as James Stanton and in Her Best Move as Josh. In addition, he appeared in the independent film State's Evidence (2006).

On stage, Bell appeared as Hanschen in the Broadway show, Spring Awakening, and earlier in regional theatre productions.

He retired from acting into tap dancing and singing in 2010.

== Filmography ==
Film
Year	Film	Role	Notes
2001	Without Charlie	Marty	Independent film
2003	Jeepers Creepers 2	Jonny Young	
2006	Love's Abiding Joy	Jeff LeHaye	Made-for-TV
2007	Her Best Move	Josh	
2007	The Seeker: The Dark Is Rising	James Stanton	
Television
Year	Title	Role	Notes
2003	Jake 2.0	Jerry Foley	Episode 1.07: "Jerry 2.0"
2004–2010	The Bold and the Beautiful	Thomas Forrester #1	378 episodes Role held: January 9, 2004 - August 27, 2010
2006	MADtv	Basketball player	Episode 12.01
2006	Standoff	Chuck Langdon	Episode 1.09: "Peer Group"
2008	The Middleman	Pip	Episode 1.05: "The Flying Fish Zombification"; Episode 1.06: "The Boyband Superfan Interrogation"; Episode 1.10: "The Vampiric Puppet Lamentation"; Episode 1.12: "The Palindrome Reversal Palindrome"
2008	90210	Foreign Car Guy	Episode 1.04: "The Bubble"
2008	Desperate Housewives	Charlie	Episode 5.07: "What More Do I Need?"
2009	CSI: Crime Scene Investigation	Max Stanton	Episode 9.13: "Deep Fried and Minty Fresh"
2009	CSI: Miami	Steve Emerson	Episode 7.23: "Collateral Damage"
2010	CSI: NY	Alex Contoursi	Episode 6.20: "Tales from the Undercard"
2010	Gigantic	Trip	Episode 1.07: "All In"
