= Leah Pipes =

American actress (born 1988)

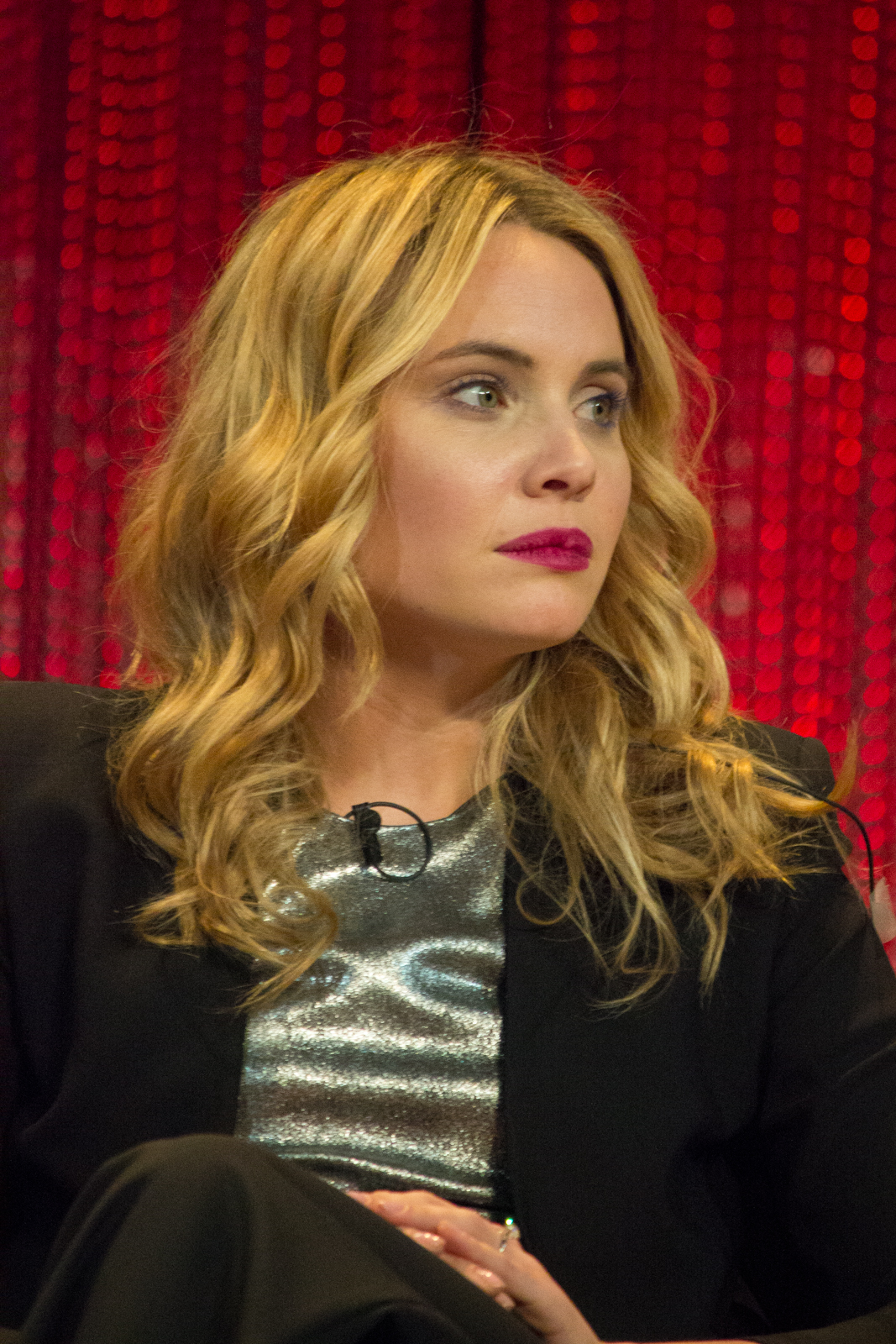
- Pipes at PaleyFest 2014 for The Originals
- Born: August 12, 1988 (age 38); Los Angeles, California, U.S.
- Occupation: Actress
- Years active: 2001–present
- Notable work: The Originals
- Spouse: A. J. Trauth (m. 2014; div. 2019)

Leah Marie Pipes (born August 12, 1988) is an American actress. She starred in the television series Life Is Wild, the slasher film Sorority Row and The CW series The Originals.

== Early life ==
Pipes was born in Los Angeles, California.

== Career ==
She broke into screen acting in 2001 on the supernatural-drama series show Angel. She was a regular on the TV series Lost at Home and appeared in the Disney Channel Original Movie Pixel Perfect as Samantha Jacobs. She starred in the movie Fingerprints in 2006 (released in 2008). She has also appeared on TV shows such as Crossing Jordan and Drake & Josh. She also appeared on Clubhouse as Jessie.

She starred in the soccer film Her Best Move. She appeared in Odd Girl Out and other small budget films. In 2006 Pipes starred as the teenage foster child Kelly in an episode of Fox's TV series Bones.

For the 2007–2008 television season, Pipes starred in the drama series Life Is Wild. She also had a recurring role in Terminator: The Sarah Connor Chronicles as Jody. She plays Beth in the ABC series The Deep End, which premiered on 21 January 2010.

She played one of the leads in her first major film, 2009's Sorority Row.

In 2010, she played Miranda for one episode of Law & Order: Los Angeles. She also played Alexis for one episode of The Defenders. In 2012, she began filming alongside Mischa Barton and Ryan Eggold in the Mark Edwin Robinson's supernatural romance thriller, Into the Dark.

In 2013, she played Katie in Jodi Arias: Dirty Little Secret, a television movie about the murder of Travis Alexander.

She starred with E.J. Bonilla in the film romance Musical Chairs, about a couple who participates in wheelchair ballroom dancing. It was released theatrically on March 23, 2012. Pipes starred in The Originals as Camille O'Connell. She also recurred in the reboot of Charmed as Fiona, a witch whose magic equals the powers of the Charmed Ones.

== Personal life ==
In January 2014, Pipes announced her engagement to actor and musician A. J. Trauth, after almost three years of dating. They married on December 6, 2014 in Santa Barbara, California. Pipes filed for divorce in May 2019.

== Filmography ==
=== Film ===
Year	Title	Role	Notes
2006	Fingerprints	Melanie	
2007	Her Best Move	Sara Davis	
2009	Sorority Row	Jessica Pierson	
2011	Conception	Carla	
2011	Literally, Right Before Aaron	Leah	Short film
2012	Musical Chairs	Mia	
2012	Into the Dark	Astrid Daniels	Also known as "I Will Follow You into the Dark"
2014	The Devil's Hand	Sarah	
2019	Heatstroke	Claire	Short film
2022	Exploited	Dr. Walker	
2022	Albacore	Iris	Short film

=== Television ===
Year	Title	Role	Notes
2001	Angel	Stephanie	Guest role; 2 episodes
2003	Lost at Home	Sarah Davis	Main role; 6 episodes
2004	Pixel Perfect	Samantha	Television film
2004	Drake & Josh	Mandi	Episode: "Football"
2004–2005	Clubhouse	Jessie	Recurring role; 5 episodes
2005	Malcolm in the Middle	Stephanie Wright	Episode: "Tiki Lounge"
2005	Odd Girl Out	Stacey Larson	Television film
2006	Bones	Kelly Morris	Episode: "The Boy in the Shroud"
2006	Shark	Jordan Metcalfe	Episode: "Sins of the Mother"
2007	Crossing Jordan	Melissa Ripton	Episode: "Seven Feet Under"
2007–2008	Life Is Wild	Katie Clarke	Main role; 12 episodes
2008	Ghost Whisperer	Kylie	Episode: "Horror Show"
2008	Terminator: The Sarah Connor Chronicles	Jody	Guest role; 2 episodes
2010	The Deep End	Beth Branford	Recurring role; 6 episodes
2010	Law & Order: LA	Miranda Clark	Episode: "Hollywood"
2010	The Defenders	Alexis	Episode: "Nevada v. Killa Diz"
2013	Glee	Electra	Episode: "Naked"
2013	The Vampire Diaries	Camille O'Connell	Episode: "The Originals"
2013	Jodi Arias: Dirty Little Secret	Katie	Television film
2013–2018	The Originals	Camille O'Connell	Main role (Seasons 1–3), Special Guest Star (Seasons 4–5); 65 episodes
2016	Change of Heart	Diane McCarthy	Television film
2018	Mommy Group Murder	Natalie	Television film
2019	Charmed	Fiona	Recurring role (season 1); 8 episodes
2019	A Beauty & The Beast Christmas	Ginger Holiday	Television Film
2021	9-1-1	Molly	Episode: "Breaking Point"

=== Music videos ===
Year	Title	Artist
2009	"Get U Home"	Shwayze

== Awards ==
Year	Award	Category	Work	Result
2016	Teen Choice Awards	Choice TV: Liplock (with Joseph Morgan)	The Originals	Nominated
