= Lisa Darr =

American actress

- Born: Lisa Darr Grabemann; April 21, 1963 (age 63); Chicago, Illinois, U.S.
- Occupation: Actress
- Years active: 1991–2017
- Spouse: Brian Valente (m. 2005–2021)

Lisa Darr (born April 21, 1963) is an American actress.

== Life and career ==
Darr was born Lisa Darr Grabemann in Chicago, Illinois, the daughter of Mollie, an actress, and Karl Grabemann, a lawyer. She attended Stanford University and graduated in 1985 with a degree in biology. She went on to receive an MFA in Acting from UCLA.

She played Annie Whitman on ABC's Life as We Know It. Darr's previous television appearances include the 1991 short-lived sitcom Flesh 'n' Blood as Rachel Brennan, The WB's teenage drama Popular as Jane McPherson, as well as the 1996 Fox series Profit as Gail Koner. In the fifth season of the sitcom Ellen, she played Laurie Manning, the girlfriend of the title character Ellen Morgan; In "Four for the Seasaw", an episode of Frasier, she and Megan Mullally played love interests for the Crane brothers. She played archaeologist Ginny Will on an episode of Quantum Leap.

Darr also made an appearance on the Fox drama House in 2006, playing a victim's mother in the episode "Distractions". She has made an appearance on the third season of The Office in the episode "Product Recall". Darr appeared in the fourth season of Weeds (on Showtime) as Ann Carilli. She also made a guest appearance in Nip/Tuck.

Her film work includes Gods and Monsters (1998), in which she appeared as Dana Boone (the wife of Brendan Fraser's character), Pomegranate (2005), as Julia (the mother of Leah Pipes's character) in the soccer film Her Best Move (2006), National Lampoon's Bag Boy (2007), and This Is 40 (2012).

== Filmography ==
=== Film ===
Year	Title	Role	Notes
1997	Casualties	Beth	
1997	Plan B	Clare Sadler	
1998	Gods and Monsters	Dana Boone	
1998	Land of the Free	Annie Jennings	
1999	Morella	Jenny Lynden	
1999	Elevator Seeking	Bonnie	Video
2005	Pomegranate	Stephanie	
2007	Her Best Move	Julia	
2007	Bagboy	Laurie	
2009	The Twenty	Katherine	
2012	This Is 40	Claire	

=== Television ===
Year	Title	Role	Notes
1991	Flesh 'n' Blood	DA. Rachel Brennan	Main role
1991	Murphy Brown	Trish	"Retreat"
1991	Wings	Gwen	"Love Means Never Having to Say Geronimo"
1991	The Flash	Terri Kronenberg	"Captain Cold"
1991	K-9	Margaret Slater	TV film
1992	Quantum Leap	Ginny Will	"The Curse of Ptah-Hotep"
1993	Complex of Fear	Penny Evans	TV film
1993	Crime & Punishment	Jan Sornesen	"Simple Trust", "Our Denial", "Fire with Fire"
1993	Incredi-Girl	Ellen	TV film
1993	Renegade	Dr. Helen	"The Hound"
1993	Northern Exposure	Ann McGrath	"Altered Egos"
1994	Betrayal of Trust	Lorna Lucus	TV film
1994	Empty Nest	Laurie	"What's a Mother to Do?"
1994	The Commish	Abby Davenport / Marcia Daniels	"The Letter of Law"
1994	Murder, She Wrote	Carrie Benton / Kelly Michaels	"Murder on the 30th Floor", "A Nest of Vipers"
1995	The Office	Natalie Stanton	Main role
1995	Platypus Man	Karen	"Out of the Mouths of Babes"
1995	Murderous Intent	Pamela Talbot	TV film
1995	One West Waikiki	Diane Reynolds	"Past Due"
1996	Murder, She Wrote	Rhonda Brock	"Southern Double-Cross"
1996	ER	Nadine Wilkes	"Last Call"
1996	Almost Perfect	Ivy	"Good Grief"
1996	The Drew Carey Show	Debbie	"Mimi's Day Parade"
1997	Men Behaving Badly	Alice	"Jamie Needs a Kid"
1997	EZ Streets	Dana Larkin	"A Terrible Beauty", "St. Jude Took a Bullet"
1997	The Sleepwalking Killing	D.A. Mary Ellen Matulus	TV film
1997	NYPD Blue	Kathy	"A Wrenching Experience", "Emission Impossible"
1996–97	Profit	Gail Koner	Main role
1997–98	Frasier	Laura Paris	"Four for the Seesaw", "Don Juan in Hell: Part 2"
1997–98	Ellen	Laurie Manning	Recurring role
1998	Early Edition	Allison Fletcher	"Deadline"
1998	Nash Bridges	Shelly	"Hardball", "Mystery Dance"
1999	Sabrina, the Teenage Witch	Martha	"Sabrina's Pen Pal"
1999–2001	Popular	Jane McPherson	Regular role
2000	Cursed	Angela Nichalos	"Pilot"
2000–03	Strong Medicine	Susan Jackson	Recurring role
2001	Philly	Carol Toland	"Truth or Consequence", "Loving Sons"
2001	CSI: Crime Scene Investigation	Gwen Anderson	"Gentle, Gentle"
2002	The X-Files	Jana Fain	"Underneath"
2003	The Lyon's Den	Dr. Celia Scott	"Duty to Save"
2003	The Guardian	Dr. Patricia Driscoll	"Swimming"
2004	Like Family	Carol Hadley	"Dating the Enemy"
2004–05	Life as We Know It	Annie Whitman	Main role
2005	Desperate Housewives	Tammy Brennan	"The Ladies Who Lunch"
2005	The West Wing	Becca	"The Al Smith Dinner"
2006	House	Emily	"Distractions"
2006	The Unit	BeverlyShowtime	"Report by Exception"
2007	Ghost Whisperer	Amanda Garnett	"Children of Ghosts"
2007	The Office	Barbara Allen	"Product Recall"
2007–2008	Weeds	Ann Carilli	"Roy Till Called", "Cankles", "The Whole Blah Damn Thing"
2008	CSI: NY	Andrea Warren	"The Box"
2008–09	Nip/Tuck	Darlene Lowell	"Candy Richards", "Ronnie Chase"
2009	Anatomy of Hope	Dierdra Casey	Unsold TV pilot
2009	CSI: Crime Scene Investigation	Nicole Jones	"Turn, Turn, Turn"
2009	Dexter	Benny's Lawyer	"Living the Dream"
2009	FlashForward	Principal Byrne	"White to Play"
2011	Drop Dead Diva	Martha Miller	"False Alarm"
2012	Parenthood	OB/GYN	"Just Smile"
2012	Criminal Minds	Helen Garrett	"Divining Rod"
2013	Knocking on Doors	Cassandra Crum	TV series
2014	The Mentalist	Hazel Haibach	"White as the Driven Snow"
2015	CSI: Cyber	Judith Bowers	"Selfie 2.0"
2017	Sweet/Vicious		"Heartbreaker"
2016-2017	Love	Diane	"The Date"
