= Lavendula =

Lavendula may refer to:

- Lavendula, grandsire of My Babu
- Lavendula, Houston-based band, which included Arthur Yoria
- Streptomyces lavendulae, which produces cycloserine, a broad-spectrum antibiotic used to treat tuberculosis

See also:

- Lavandula, the lavender genus of flowering plants
