= Happy! (TV series) =

American television series

- Intertitle taken from the episode "Saint Nick"
- Genre: Action; Black comedy; Crime; Fantasy drama; Thriller
- Created by: Grant Morrison; Darick Robertson
- Based on: Happy! by: Grant Morrison; Darick Robertson
- Developed by: Grant Morrison; Brian Taylor
- Starring: Christopher Meloni; Ritchie Coster; Lili Mirojnick; Medina Senghore; Patrick Fischler; Christopher Fitzgerald; Bryce Lorenzo
- Voices of: Patton Oswalt
- Composers: Guillaume Roussel; Blair Mowat
- Country of origin: United States
- Original languages: English and Spanish
- No. of seasons: 2
- No. of episodes: 18

Production
- Executive producers: Neal H. Moritz; Pavun Shetty; Toby Jaffe; Christopher Meloni; Brian Taylor; Grant Morrison; Patrick MacManus
- Producers: Thomas Sellitti, Jr.; Bill Butler
- Camera setup: Single-camera
- Running time: 40–48 minutes
- Production companies: Hypernormal (season 2); Original Film; Littleton Road; Universal Content Productions

Original release
- Network: Syfy
- Release: December 6, 2017 – May 29, 2019

Happy! is an American black comedy action television series based on the four-part graphic novel of the same name created by writer Grant Morrison and artist Darick Robertson, with Brian Taylor serving as director for a majority of the episodes (seven of the first eleven).

The series premiered on Syfy on December 6, 2017, receiving mostly positive reviews. On January 29, 2018, it was announced that Syfy had renewed the series for a second season, which premiered on March 27, 2019. On June 4, 2019, the series was cancelled by Syfy after two seasons.

== Premise ==
Disgraced police detective Nick Sax lives as a social outcast, filling his days with light drinking and substance abuse, moonlighting as a hitman to feed his various habits. After having a massive cardiac arrest, Nick comes into contact with a small, blue, winged (animated) unicorn named Happy that apparently only he can see. Happy explains he is the imaginary friend of a little girl named Hailey, who has been kidnapped by a deranged man dressed as Santa Claus ("Very Bad Santa"). Happy reveals that Hailey is Nick's estranged daughter and sought Nick's aid, believing him to be the hero cop that Hailey envisioned him to be. Though skeptical at first, Nick reluctantly agrees and the two work to save Hailey. The events of their search slowly begin to reveal the existence of a massive, global conspiracy involving child trafficking, sex cults, aliens, ancient gods, and the apocalypse.

== Cast and characters ==
=== Main ===
- Christopher Meloni as Nick Sax, a cynical, alcoholic ex-detective turned ex-hitman turned cab driver
- Ritchie Coster as Francisco "Mr. Blue" Scaramucci, a wealthy, insecure, and temperamental crime boss who poses as a legitimate businessman and wine importer
  - Coster also portrays Orcus, the Roman god of death who possesses Scaramucci's body
- Lili Mirojnick as Meredith "Merry" McCarthy, a resilient homicide detective with a dark past
- Medina Senghore as Amanda Hansen, Nick's ex-wife and Hailey's mother
- Patrick Fischler as "Smoothie" / "The Bunny", one of Mr. Blue's enforcers and a psychopathic killer who specializes in interrogation and torture
- Patton Oswalt as the voice of Happy, an "imaginary" blue, goofy, cartoonish, winged unicorn
- Christopher Fitzgerald as Louis Sheinberg, a children's entertainer also known as "Sonny Shine", and to Blue as "Mr. Bug" (season 2; recurring season 1)
- Bryce Lorenzo as Hailey Louise Hansen, a young girl who was kidnapped, and sends her imaginary friend Happy to find help (season 2; recurring season 1)

=== Recurring ===
- Joseph D. Reitman as Very Bad Santa, a delusional, drug-addicted psychopath dressed like Santa Claus who kidnaps children (recurring season 1; guest season 2)
- Debi Mazar as Isabella Scaramucci, Blue's sister, star of the reality show Secrets of My Sussex, and mother of the four Scaramucci brothers gunned down by Sax
- Gus Halper as Michelangelo "Disco Mikey" Scaramucci, the youngest of Isabella's sons (season 1)
- Laura Poe as Jessica McCarthy, Merry's elderly widowed mother (season 1)
- Michael Maize as Le Dic, an arms dealer connected to Nick Sax's past
- Carly Sullivan as Gala Scaramucci, Blue's wife
- Dante Pereira-Olson as Gerry Scaramucci, Blue's son
- Jaimie Kelton as the voice of Bo Peep, an imaginary friend and Happy's love interest
- Antonia Rey as Assunta, Blue and Isabella Scaramucci's spiritual aunt
- Joseph Perrino as Pal Scaramucci, one of Isabella Scaramucci's sons (season 1)
- Ann-Margret as Bebe Debarge, a former actress and Sonny Shine's wife (season 2)
- Big Show as Big Pink, Blue's prison boyfriend (season 2)
- Laura Darrell as Sister Lee (season 2)
- Curtis Armstrong as Dayglo Doug (season 2)
- Daniel Sunjata as Simon (season 2)

=== Guest ===
- Jerry Springer as himself (in "What Smiles are For")
- Alison Fraser as Mrs. Claus (in "When Christmas Was Christmas")
- Billy West as the voice of Raspberry, an imaginary purple three-headed bulldog (in "The Scrapyard of Childish Things")
- "Weird Al" Yankovic as the voice of Smoking Man Baby (in "19 Hours and 13 Minutes")
- Christopher Meloni as Janet Sax, mother of Nick Sax (in "Pervapalooza")
- Amanda Palmer as leader of the Blue Feather (in "Five Chicken Fingers and a Gun")
- Jeff Goldblum as God (in "Resurrection")

== Episodes ==
Season	Episodes	Originally released	
Season	Episodes	First released	Last released
1	8	December 6, 2017	January 31, 2018
2	10	March 27, 2019	May 29, 2019

=== Season 1 (2017–18) ===
No. overall	No. in season	Title	Directed by	Written by	Original release date	U.S. viewers (millions)
1	1	"Saint Nick"	Brian Taylor	Grant Morrison & Brian Taylor	December 6, 2017	1.10
Former cop turned hitman Nick Sax stumbles across the Scaramucci family secret during a hit, which puts his life in danger. Hailey is kidnapped by Very Bad Santa, bringing to life her imaginary friend "Happy", who then seeks out Sax for his help saving Hailey. After a bloody escape from Smoothie and his men at the hospital, Sax learns from Happy that Hailey is his daughter.
2	2	"What Smiles Are For"	Brian Taylor	Patrick Macmanus	December 13, 2017	0.61
Aware that McCarthy had helped Sax escape, Blue instructs her to bring Sax to him and threatens to have Smoothie kill her mother should she refuse. McCarthy demands to be free from his control in exchange. Sax is drawn into a game of cards by an ex-associate, Le Dic, after asking him for some guns and money. With his luck down, Sax uses Happy to cheat by looking at their cards to win. After contemplating his situation, Sax decides to partner with Happy to save Hailey.
3	3	"When Christmas Was Christmas"	Brian Taylor	Brian Taylor	December 20, 2017	0.62
Sax and Happy begin their search for Hailey, which takes them to a strip club in search of a disheveled-looking Santa. In the past, Sax and McCarthy are revealed to be having an affair, unaware that Sax's wife, Amanda, is pregnant with Hailey. The pair investigate a man who murdered his wife and young baby, which causes Sax to violently beat the man while McCarthy watches. McCarthy and Amanda work together to search for Hailey and speak with a couple who claim their daughter had been kidnapped. Amanda learns that the couple had hidden their daughter in the attic for what McCarthy believes to be media attention. Outside the club, Sax is attacked by Very Bad Santa, who reveals that he can see Happy.
4	4	"Year of the Horse"	Wayne Yip	Noelle Valdivia	December 27, 2017	0.64
After Very Bad Santa tries to eat Happy, he vomits up the fortune to a fortune cookie. Sax traces the fortune first to the company that produced it and then to the restaurant in Chinatown that sells it, tracking down who delivers to Very Bad Santa while avoiding Triad assassins. Blue's sister Isabella, while filming a reality show, sees the bodies of her sons at the city morgue, and discovers that the body of the youngest, Mikey, is missing. Meeting McCarthy at the warehouse where Very Bad Santa kept the imprisoned children, Sax and Happy find they have arrived moments too late since Blue, at the behest of the mysterious "Mr. Bug", has had Very Bad Santa take Hailey and the other children to another location.
5	5	"White Sauce? Hot Sauce?"	Wayne Yip	Peter Macmanus	January 10, 2018	0.62
Hailey and the other children arrive at a new prison made up like a classroom, with Smoothie as the "teacher". McCarthy is investigated by Internal Affairs officers working for Blue for not bringing in Sax for the Scaramucci killings. Urged by Happy, Sax meets Amanda for the first time in ten years, but the house is attacked by masked men, whom Sax brutally kills. Sax blames Happy for the disastrous reunion and makes a point about human nature by attempting suicide on the subway tracks; Happy leaves, but Sax is rescued by people waiting on the platform. Looking for Happy and hearing a taco truck vendor singing "Blue Christmas", Sax recalls that he had met Very Bad Santa before while working for Blue. Suddenly an undead and naked Mikey Scaramucci sits next to him and begins masturbating.
6	6	"The Scrapyard of Childish Things"	David Petrarca	Ken Kristensen	January 17, 2018	0.62
Happy meets a three-headed dog named Raspberry, who introduces him to his friend — Blue's son Gerry, who tortures and kills imaginary friends. Sax leaves Mikey at a church while he confronts Blue, demanding Hailey's release in exchange for Mikey. However, Mikey terrifies the priest in the confessional after speaking Latin in a demonic voice, which allows him to escape to his mother's house. Sax is captured attempting to bluff Blue with a bomb; as he is about to be executed, Sax professes that he believes in Happy, giving Happy enough strength to kill Raspberry and chase Gerry into the garage. The distraction allows Sax to kill Blue's men, and he and Happy escape as Gerry blows up himself and his mother. At her apartment, McCarthy learns from her mother Jessica that a group of men had threatened them on the day that McCarthy's father was killed and that Blue was one of them; Jessica then commits suicide in the kitchen to remove Blue's leverage over McCarthy.
7	7	"Destroyer of Worlds"	Brian Taylor	Matthew White	January 24, 2018	0.52
Questioning children's entertainer Sonny Shine about the kidnappings, Amanda realizes that he, who is revealed to be "Mr. Bug", is behind them. Smoothie has the children packaged like dolls and loaded in a truck. After Mikey escapes from her house, Isabella discovers that Blue put out the hit on her sons, and works with her spiritualist aunt Assunta to stop him. Assunta says that Mikey does not have a password, but an Orcus demon, and that if Blue gets it, "all is lost". Sax, Happy, and McCarthy, tipped off by Amanda, infiltrate a Sonny Shine set to find Hailey. Smoothie subdues Sax and—revealing himself to lack genitalia, the origin of his nickname—and sexually assaults him before he is shot by McCarthy. Sax catches up to the truck, finding all the children safe—except for Hailey, with evidence pointing at Very Bad Santa.
8	8	"I Am the Future"	Brian Taylor	Brian Taylor & Grant Morrison	January 31, 2018	0.54
McCarthy successfully pressures Sonny Shine to release Amanda. At Very Bad Santa's hideout, Sax and Happy find all the children he has kidnapped over the years, physically grown up but lobotomized to remain "children" forever. Hailey escapes the same fate and flees to the roof where Happy finds her. Sax pursues and fights Very Bad Santa. As Sax suffers another heart attack, Happy and other imaginary friends attack Very Bad Santa. Hailey gives Sax his pills and he kills Very Bad Santa. After reuniting Hailey with her mother, Sax nearly dies from a heart attack, leading to rumor that he is dead. Happy bids farewell to Hailey and rejoins Sax. In a post-credits scene, Blue is visited at Rikers Island by a dying Mikey, who exhales the Orcus demon into Blue's ear. Blue suffers a seizure as hellish images flood the screen. Blue then stands upright and when asked if he is all right, he responds, "I'm hungry."

=== Season 2 (2019) ===
No. overall	No. in season	Title	Directed by	Written by	Original release date	U.S. viewers (millions)
9	1	"The War on Easter"	Brian Taylor	Grant Morrison & Brian Taylor	March 27, 2019	0.34
Several explosive clad nuns run terrified through the city after being tasked by a man in a bunny costume to find a detonation device hidden inside an egg. Nick Sax now works as a cab driver and vows to reform himself but is reminded when he falters by Happy. Scooter Sterling, a snobby celebrity meant to host a charity Easter hunt, is kidnapped by the man in the bunny costume. Meanwhile, in prison Blue learns that Mikey had passed an evil spirit to him and watches as Isabella is murdered in front of him by her aunt Assunta, in order to keep Orcus trapped. Sax's reformation is short-lived when he stumbles across an organ harvesting ring while rescuing a friend and kills the men in the room. Sonny reveals his plan to make Easter great again and learns that Smoothie is the man in the bunny costume.
10	2	"Tallahassee"	Christopher Meloni	Evan Reilly	April 3, 2019	0.29
Sax and Hailey spend the day together and decide to place imaginary bets at the horse races. When Sax learns of Hailey's innate ability to predict winners, he borrows $40 from Hailey to bet on a horse she had chosen. But when the horse is injured during the race, Sax becomes infuriated and upsets Hailey, who runs out of the shop and toward a Jewish man nearby. The man calls Sax by name and tells him that he needs to retrieve a kidney for his sick father and bring it to him at a bingo hall. It turns out that the kidney belongs to a live donor, and Sax is threatened should he not deliver the kidney. Sax decides to rig an explosive trap in a cooler and returns to the Jewish man and kills him along with his associates for threatening his family. After returning Hailey home to Amanda, Amanda questions Sax as to why Hailey is so upset. In her diary, Hailey finds a pink rabbit's foot left by Smoothie, who made it out of a live rabbit he dipped in a pot of dye.
11	3	"Some Girls Need a Lot of Repenting"	Brian Taylor	Noelle Valdivia	April 10, 2019	0.30
Nick is hired via Le Dic for a breaking and entering job to steal video tapes from Sonny Shine's house, where he encounters Shine's sloshed ex-star trophy wife. Nick delivers after dealing with the security guards in a bizarre dance and 'electric' musical number; then finds out that he was hired by Meredith to steal Sonny's kompromat that he uses to blackmail influential people throughout the world. Meanwhile, Hailey breaks down on her first day at a Catholic school where her PTSD causes her to break a priest's thumb; her mother Amanda, also post-traumatic, almost drowns a young patient at work which gets her fired. In prison, Blue kills the 7 henchmen sent after him by Sonny but has no memory how. Children at Sterling's Easter hunt find him grotesquely skinned within a giant chocolate bunny, disposed there by Smoothie, who later saves Hailey from her classmate bully by crushing her under the gym bleachers. Sonny's tapes appear to be nothing but porn, until Nick finds one about former kids' show host Dayglo Doug wearing obscene Nazi attire.
12	4	"Blitzkrieg!!!"	Joseph Kahn	Ken Kristensen	April 17, 2019	0.29
While Nick and Merry break Dayglo Doug out of a retirement home of elderly nazis, Smoothie approaches Hailey and apologizes for what he did in the past, beginning to form a bond with her and manipulating her by pointing out the failures of her parents, as Amanda got fired and is in an extramarital relationship with a man named Simon and they have sex in a bathroom stall. In the meantime Orcus progressively takes more control over Blue's body and uses his demonic powers to violently get the prisoners to side with him. Merry shows her research on Sonny to Doug, explaining how she has collected the strange slime that poured out of one of the "Wishees" (the Teletubbies-inspired mascots in Sonny's show) she shot, claiming it acted alive and that she put it in her fridge inside a jar. Nick mistakenly eats the slime, believing it to be jelly, and after ejecting and struggling with the sentient ooze in the bathroom, is sent into a frenzy and runs outside the house.
13	5	"19 Hours and 13 Minutes"	Marianna Palka	Ahamdu Garba	April 24, 2019	0.31
Intoxicated from eating the Wishee's blood, Nick has self-reflective hallucinations, forgetting about Hailey's birthday. Amanda generally neglects Hailey, including forgetting her birthday as well, and develops an addiction to nitrous oxide from whipped cream spray cans, which she later links to the orgy Sonny subjected her to with the Wishees. Happy goes to the Catholic school and witnesses Hailey getting a spoiled (and possibly made with feces) Christmas-style fruitcake for her birthday, which triggers her PTSD. Happy decides to go away with Little Bo Peep, a female imaginary friend. In prison, Blue asks his cellmate to kill him to stop Orcus. Merry and Doug make their way inside Sonny's headquarters, Shine Tower, which Merry infiltrates, disguised as a Wishee, while Sonny kills Doug when Doug confronts Sonny for ruining his career. Sonny takes back Doug's tape and places it in a secret room filled with other blackmail tapes, but Merry steals the one featuring Kap Gostynski, the head of the television network that airs Sonny's shows. Hailey returns to the park where she was kidnapped and meets Smoothie again, who befriends her further by unexpectedly wishing her a happy birthday, when in reality, he had earlier switched the legitimate birthday cake that Hailey's classmates had gotten for her with the spoiled fruitcake.
14	6	"Pervapalooza"	Marianna Palka	Patrick Macmanus & Ashley Michel Hoban	May 1, 2019	0.29
Merry and Nick discover that the Wishees are headless fleshy creatures while Amanda, who came to Shine Tower to confront Sonny, is captured and learns that she is pregnant, though she does not know whether the father is Nick, Simon (both of whom she recently had sex with), or a Wishee from Sonny's orgy. Believing the father to be a Wishee, Sonny releases Amanda after giving her a vial of white substance to swallow. Nick takes Hailey to his mother to keep her safe, but Hailey escapes after putting her to sleep with a drugged cocktail and spends time with Smoothie. Meanwhile, Happy has sex with Bo Peep and loses his virginity. Nick disguises himself to enter Mr. Bug's costumed orgy and shoot him dead, only to bump into Amanda there, under the effect of the substance Sonny gave her. At the prison, Blue's cellmate Pink knocks the guards down after a fight and takes Blue to the top of the building, throwing himself and Blue off of the building (per Blue's earlier request) in order to die together.
15	7	"Arlo and Marie"	Wayne Yip	Noelle Valdivia	May 8, 2019	0.27
At Mr. Bug's orgy, Amanda discloses to Nick that she is pregnant, and does not know who the father is. Nick escapes the party by holding Amanda at gunpoint, takes her home, and encounters Happy, the morning after his romantic night with Bo Peep, who has dashed his hopes for an on-going relationship. Nick extracts himself from the costume he wore to the orgy, and Amanda attempts to seduce him. Hailey then arrives, having left her Grandma's after she fell asleep. Amanda tells Hailey that she will soon be a sister and paints a rosy picture of the family life she wishes to create. Meanwhile, Merry visits Assunta in prison and learns that the Wishees are "Lemures", creatures from the underworld that do Orcus' bidding and throughout history have helped many renowned "idols" to rise to fame and power, including Cleopatra, Abraham Lincoln, John F. Kennedy, Princess Diana, John Lennon, and Gandhi, only for Orcus to kill them at the peak of their success, to feed off the grief of the generation of people that loved them. Sonny Shine is the next idol to be murdered, in front of millions of fans on television on Easter. Merry is relieved that Blue/Orcus is locked up in a high security prison, but Assunta forebodingly tells her that that is incorrect. Indeed, Orcus is not in prison, but is introducing himself to Sonny on a visit to his mansion, having survived the fall at the prison, while Blue did not. Orcus sends the prisoners he brainwashed and brought with him from the prison to retrieve Amanda. Hailey overhears Nick tell Amanda that Sonny had kidnapped her at Christmas; fed up with her parents, she runs off to see Smoothie, who was healed by the Lemures after Merry shot him and now serves Orcus. Happy tells Nick about seeing Hailey with Smoothie, prompting Nick, having survived the prisoner attack, to gear up and go after him.
16	8	"A Friend of Death"	Wayne Yip	Brian Taylor	May 15, 2019	0.24
Nick and Happy arrive at Smoothie's hideout, only to escape its explosive trap and get arrested by the police. Merry visits Kap Gostynski to tell him to cancel Sonny's Easter Eggstacular show, but he doesn't believe her. Later the snuff tape starring Kap is shown on the news after the heads of the channel cancel Sonny's show, and Kap kills himself on the spot. Meanwhile, Smoothie takes Hailey over to his adoptive Hispanic mother, and during a stop at a gas station, Hailey overhears two truckers talking about a child who cut and put his own genitals in a jar for a science fair thirty years before, hinting it to be Smoothie, who seemingly reveals a troubled childhood with his abusive father and has Hailey witness him killing him (a flashback revealing the man to be a stranger), in order to endorse vengeful murder and have her ready to kill Sonny for what he did to her. Merry and Nick fight off a Lemure that attacks them when they arrive at the hospital where Orcus took Amanda (killing Simon when they left Sonny's mansion), as she begins to give birth.
17	9	"Five Chicken Fingers and a Gun"	Brian Taylor	Patrick Macmanus & Ashley Michel Hoban	May 22, 2019	0.25
Amanda delivers a mass of Lemure eggs, but she comes to her senses and uses an oxygen tank to burn the eggs and set the Wishees on fire, while Orcus escapes using his powers to force the hospital staff and the other patients to take the shots fired by Nick and Merry. Happy realizes that he has powers similar to Orcus' and has the bystanders make love instead, and Amanda briefly sees him. Orcus sends his prisoners to take over the network and allow Sonny's show to happen, while Nick and Amanda follow Smoothie. Merry learns that Assunta killed herself in prison after Orcus paid her a visit, but is given clues that take her to a pawn shop where she forcefully joins the Blue Feather cult, whose spiritualist members seek to keep ancient gods at bay. Smoothie has Amanda inject Nick with a shot of tranquilizer while Orcus delivers Hailey her dinner and the gun she'll use to kill Sonny. Note: The episode ends with a dedication in the memory of Antonia Rey, the actress who played Assunta.
18	10	"Resurrection"	Brian Taylor	Brian Taylor	May 29, 2019	0.29
Smoothie takes Nick and Amanda to the theater where the Eggstacular show is held and locks Amanda in a room and places Nick, under the effect of the drug, on a seat to witness Hailey killing Sonny Shine. Happy manages to free Amanda and recover Nick by having him drink imaginary alcohol. Sonny murders an actor he dressed in Smoothie's bunny suit on stage to be seen as the savior of Easter. Nick sacrifices himself by taking the bullet Hailey fires to kill Sonny, but Amanda shoots him dead. Sonny's death also kills every imaginary friend due to the kids' sadness. Merry takes custody of Hailey following Amanda's arrest, while in the afterlife Nick accepts Orcus' offer to return from the dead and exact his revenge on Smoothie, though on the condition of Nick now being bound to his service. Happy is saddened by these events and Bo Peep cheating on him with his friend Twigs and a chompy teeth with eyes, and wanders New York, oblivious to everyone now being able to see him, but angrily flying into the sky above the clouds, ends up meeting God, the imaginary friend "of an entire civilization", who sympathizes with Happy and encourages him to take action, in addition revealing Nick to be alive. Six months later, around Halloween season, Smoothie is confronted by a resurrected Nick, who twists his neck and decapitates him with his bare hands and places his head among carved pumpkins on the porch as he leaves. Smoothie's head holds his smile in death, his red "bunny eye" sporadically moving.

== Production ==
Happy was originally voiced by Bobby Moynihan in the pilot, but was later replaced by Patton Oswalt.

== Release ==
The series premiered on Syfy on December 6, 2017. On January 29, 2018, it was announced that Syfy had renewed the series for a second season, which premiered on March 27, 2019. On June 4, 2019, the series was cancelled by Syfy after two seasons.

== Reception ==
=== Critical response ===
The review aggregator website Rotten Tomatoes reported an approval rating of 81% based on 36 reviews. The website's critical consensus states, "Happy! certainly isn't for everyone, but its appealingly oddball concept and strong performances from Chris Meloni and Patton Oswalt make for a gritty, dark comedy with definite—albeit unusual—appeal." Metacritic, which uses a weighted average, assigned a score of 65 out of 100 based on 21 reviews, indicating "generally favorable reviews".

=== Ratings ===
==== Season 1 ====
Viewership and ratings per episode of Happy!
No.	Title	Air date	Rating (18–49)	Viewers (millions)	DVR (18–49)	DVR viewers (millions)	Total (18–49)	Total viewers (millions)
1	"Saint Nick"	December 6, 2017	0.4	1.10	0.3	0.74	0.7	1.84
2	"What Smiles Are For"	December 13, 2017	0.2	0.61	—N/a	—N/a	—N/a	—N/a
3	"When Christmas Was Christmas"	December 20, 2017	0.2	0.62	—N/a	—N/a	—N/a	—N/a
4	"Year of the Horse"	December 27, 2017	0.2	0.64	—N/a	—N/a	—N/a	—N/a
5	"White Sauce? Hot Sauce?"	January 10, 2018	0.2	0.62	0.2	0.64	0.4	1.26
6	"The Scrapyard of Childish Things"	January 17, 2018	0.2	0.62	0.2	0.69	0.4	1.30
7	"Destroyer of Worlds"	January 24, 2018	0.2	0.52	0.2	0.63	0.4	1.15
8	"I Am the Future"	January 31, 2018	0.2	0.54	0.2	0.67	0.4	1.21

==== Season 2 ====
Viewership and ratings per episode of Happy!
No.	Title	Air date	Rating (18–49)	Viewers (millions)	DVR (18–49)	DVR viewers (millions)	Total (18–49)	Total viewers (millions)
1	"The War on Easter"	March 27, 2019	0.1	0.34	0.2	0.54	0.3	0.88
2	"Tallahassee"	April 3, 2019	0.1	0.29	0.2	0.38	0.3	0.66 (Note: Live +7 ratings were not available, so Live +3 ratings have been used instead.)
3	"Some Girls Need A Lot Of Repenting"	April 10, 2019	0.1	0.30	—N/a	0.36	—N/a	0.66
4	"Blitzkrieg!!!"	April 17, 2019	0.1	0.29	0.2	0.41	0.3	0.70
5	"19 Hours and 13 Minutes"	April 24, 2019	0.1	0.31	—N/a	0.30	—N/a	0.61
6	"Pervapalooza"	May 1, 2019	0.1	0.29	—N/a	0.28	—N/a	0.57
7	"Arlo and Marie"	May 8, 2019	0.1	0.27	—N/a	0.24	—N/a	0.51
8	"A Friend of Death"	May 15, 2019	0.1	0.24	—N/a	0.26	—N/a	0.50
9	"Five Chicken Fingers and a Gun"	May 22, 2019	0.1	0.25	—N/a	0.31	—N/a	0.56
10	"Resurrection"	May 29, 2019	0.1	0.29	—N/a	0.32	—N/a	0.61

Happy! : U.S. viewers per episode (thousands)

Season	Episode number									
Season	1	2	3	4	5	6	7	8	9	10
1	1100	610	620	640	620	620	520	540	–	
2	340	290	300	290	310	290	270	240	250	290

Audience measurement performed by Nielsen Media Research

== See also ==
- IF (film): A Family Comedy movie with similarly animated Imaginary Friends.
