= Her Best Move =

2005 film by Norm Hunter

- Theatrical release poster
- Directed by: Norm Hunter
- Written by: Norm Hunter; Tony Vidal
- Produced by: Norm Hunter
- Starring: Leah Pipes; Scott Patterson; Lisa Darr; Drew Tyler Bell; Lalaine; Daryl Sabara
- Cinematography: Paul Ryan
- Edited by: Mitch Stanley
- Music by: Didier Lean Rachou
- Production company: Summertime Films
- Distributed by: MGM Distribution Co. 20th Century Fox Home Entertainment
- Release date: March 31, 2007
- Running time: 102 minutes
- Country: United States
- Language: English

Her Best Move is a 2007 American teen romantic comedy film directed by Norm Hunter.

It tells the story of a fifteen year old soccer prodigy named Sara Davis who has a chance to join the U.S. National Team. She must simultaneously juggle high school, romance, sports, and parental pressure.

It was filmed in 2005, and had its initial release on March 31, 2007

== Plot ==
Fifteen year old High School freshman Sara Davis, a teenage soccer prodigy, joins her school's varsity team as a sophomore. Preened by her father Gil since she was small, he hopes he can get her on the U.S. National Soccer Team as their youngest recruit ever.

Arriving home after a successful game, although Sara's coach had been critical of her lack of teamwork, her mom Julia tries to focus her attention on school. When she initially is not selected for the team, both her mom and best friend Tutti suggest she try to interact with classmates.

Sara is perceived as a jock first and foremost. She rejoins a dance group through Tutti, but its spring performance conflicts with soccer. Overhearing guys in the cafeteria dissing her, Sara dumps a tray of food on the head of the worst critic.

The next day Gil, who has not been sleeping at home for days, turns up to tell Sara about another opening on the national team. Julia suggests he try to connect with her other than through soccer.

When National Team scouts turn up at a practise, senior teammate Regina plays aggressively, reminding Sara she is also in contention for the spot. Having noticed student photographer Josh Anderson, Sara approaches him and they talk for a briefly.

Tutti tells Sara about Josh, he was home-schooled for years so is quite solitary and now a year ahead. He comes into the ice cream parlour where Sara works and invites her to snap pictures in a special place. Afterwards, she has to hurry off first for soccer practise then a dance audition, but crashes her bike on the way.

Sara finds her daily life to be extremely hectic, as she tries to find a balance between high school, running, romance, sports, and parental pressure while realizing her own priorities, and has to sacrifice her interests in dance, photography, and her social life to concentrate on her sport. Her mom suggests she trying to pull back a bit from soccer to enjoy life more, as getting on the national team, although giving her a chance to participate in the olympics means she would have to move away.

At school, Tutti sides with Sara's mom, and Sara tells her about developments with Josh. He then approaches her, suggesting she accompany him to develop some of the photos. In the darkroom they kiss, and Josh invites Sara to the Spring Fling dance.

At the soccer team's semi-final, Sara's team wins, but the coach is critical of their lack of cohesion, as there is notable conflict especially between Regina and Sara. Tutti loudly reacts to Sara's news about Josh over her cell, to create envy in Regina. It backfires, as Josh asks the latter to cut Sara some slack. Regina then claims that Sara complained that he kisses badly.

The hurt Josh then blows off meeting with Sara. When she sees him to find out why, he gives her the cold shoulder, and takes back the invitation to the dance. Tutti and Julia work hard to beautify and encourage Sara for the dance. She is able to clear the misunderstanding with Josh, but as he supposes she will be off to Florida for training, he opts to remain apart.

At the final, Sara decides to support the team over self. She sets up Regina with the winning goal, handing the spot on the National team to her. Josh misses the last minutes of the game, so incorrectly assumes Sara is off to training camp in Florida. Not only do Gil and Julia reconcile at the game, but Sara hunts down Josh so they can finally begin a relationship.

== Cast ==
- Leah Pipes as Sara Davis
- Scott Patterson as Gil Davis
- Lisa Darr as Julia
- Drew Tyler Bell as Josh
- Lalaine as Tutti
- Daryl Sabara as Doogie
- Jhoanna Flores as Regina
- Denise Dowse as Lisa
- Fay Masterson as Lori
- Brandi Chastain as herself

== See also ==
- List of association football films
