= Alicia Morton =

American actress

- Born: Alicia Marie Morton; April 29, 1987 (age 39); Gonzales, Louisiana, U.S.
- Education: East Ascension High School; Tulane University
- Occupations: Actress, singer, dancer, drama teacher, veterinarian technician
- Years active: 1999–2011
- Spouse: Will Norwood (m. 2025)
- Children: 1

Alicia Morton Norwood (born April 29, 1987) is an American former actress, singer, dancer, drama teacher, and veterinarian technician. She starred as Annie Bennett Warbucks in the 1999 Wonderful World of Disney production of Annie, which was based on the Broadway musical of the same name.

== Biography ==
Morton was born and raised in Gonzales, Louisiana, and started singing when she was 18 months old. When she was 12, she played the titular role in Annie at her school in nearby Baton Rouge, Louisiana. She was 8 when she landed the part of young Cosette in Broadway's Les Misérables in 1996. Co-star Ricky Martin would rub makeup on her hands for good luck. In 1998, Morton beat 3,000 girls to win the part of Annie in the Disney television film Annie, which premiered on The Wonderful World of Disney on November 7, 1999, following a private screening at the New Amsterdam Theatre on November 1, 1999. In Annie, Morton co-starred with Lalaine, who would go on to star in the Disney Channel original series Lizzie McGuire from 2001 to 2004, and in the 2003 Disney Channel original movie You Wish!. In this role, Morton struggled with some of the dramatic moments. "The emotional scenes were hard for me," she says, until an acting coach suggested that she draw on her father's death. Her best friend, Alexis Kalehoff, is the daughter of Broadway's original Annie, Andrea McArdle. McArdle also had a cameo role in Morton's Annie, playing the Star-to-Be who has a solo in the song “N.Y.C.”. Her most recent film was the 2007 vampire horror film The Thirst, where she played a young girl with hemophilia named Sara.

She graduated from East Ascension High School in Gonzales in 2005, and started her first year of college in 2006. She also plays guitar. She studied music at Tulane University in New Orleans, Louisiana, and also occasionally performs in regional theatre.

From October 6 to October 16, 2011, Morton starred alongside McArdle in the new musical Greenwood at the New York Musical Theatre Festival. Morton then returned to Gonzales and taught drama at Ascension Christian High School.

== Soundtracks ==
- Annie (1999 film soundtrack)

== Filmography ==
Year	Film	Role	Notes
1999	Annie	Annie Bennett Warbucks	YoungStar Award for Best Young Actress in a miniseries/made-for-TV film Nominated- Young Artist Award for Best performance in a TV Movie or Pilot-Leading Young Actress; Nominated-Young Artist Award for Best Performance in a Feature Film or TV Movie-Young Ensemble
2001	The Big House		
2001	Dodson's Journey	Maggie Dodson	
2004	Miracle Run	Jennifer	
2005	Odd Girl Out	Tiffany Thompson	
2007	The Thirst	Sara	
2018	Deadpool 2	Vocalist of Tomorrow	Voice only; archival audio from Annie
