= Superfast! =

- Theatrical release poster
- Directed by: Jason Friedberg; Aaron Seltzer
- Written by: Jason Friedberg; Aaron Seltzer
- Produced by: Jason Friedberg; Aaron Seltzer; Peter Safran
- Starring: Alex Ashbaugh; Dale Pavinski; Lili Mirojnick; Andrea Navedo; Dio Johnson
- Cinematography: Shaun Maurer
- Edited by: Peck Prior
- Music by: Tim Wynn
- Production companies: The Safran Company; 3 in the Box
- Distributed by: Ketchup Entertainment
- Release date: April 3, 2015
- Running time: 99 minutes
- Country: United States
- Language: English
- Box office: $2.1 million

Superfast! (also known as Superfast & Superfurious and sometimes marketed as Superfast 8) is a 2015 American independent action comedy film written and directed by Jason Friedberg and Aaron Seltzer. The film is a parody of the Fast & Furious film series. It was released in theaters and VOD on April 3, 2015, to coincide with the premiere of Furious 7.

== Plot ==
Undercover police officer Lucas White enters the world of underground street racing to join a gang of street racers led by Vin Serento to get closer to a crime ring led by Los Angeles kingpin Juan Carlos de la Sol. The morning after losing a street race, Lucas goes to Vin's garage with a wrecked Smart Fortwo and lands a job as a mechanic, despite objections by Vin's friend Curtis. He also develops a relationship with Vin's sister Jordana.

The next day, Lucas and Vin head to a secluded area, where they win a dance audition for de la Sol. The duo drive de la Sol's supercar to a warehouse to meet up with a gang and exchange it for a briefcase of cash, only to discover a bomb inside. They play catch with the gang until the bomb explodes on Vin's face before a shootout ensues. Vin chases after the gang leader while Lucas accidentally guns down Detective Hanover, his superior and the only one aware of his identity as an undercover cop. After the duo flee from the scene, Detective Rock Johnson and Officer Julie Canaro arrive to investigate the shootout. Meanwhile, de la Sol orders a hit on Vin following the double-cross. Back at Serento Garage, Vin and the gang discover a list of de la Sol's illegal activities through a computer in the supercar, to which they set out to steal de la Sol's secret stash of $100 million. For this heist, Vin employs the services of Rapper Cameo, Cool Asian Guy, and Model Turned Actress. At the same time, Jordana reveals to Lucas that she is pregnant with their child. Later, the gang begin their heist, but end up on the wrong street and mistakenly mug a pastor and a nun delivering bingo night money. They regroup and deduce that the secret stash is inside a Big Ass Taco restaurant owned by De la Sol. They hatch a plan to break into the vault, steal the cash, and flee to an extradition-free country with no casualties involved, except for Curtis. The next morning, Johnson and his squad raid the garage; the facility is empty, but Canaro discovers the gang's plans, which are heavily ignored by Johnson.

At the Big Ass Taco, the gang realize they have been double-crossed by Curtis and engage in a shootout with de la Sol's thugs. At the last minute, Curtis is shot dead by de la Sol's henchman Cesar while protecting Vin. Using the restored Smart and Lucas' Toyota Corolla, Vin and Lucas tow the whole restaurant away. De la Sol and Cesar chase after them with Johnson and his squad in pursuit. Vin's lesbian girlfriend Michelle hands herself over to Canaro to help the gang get away. Meanwhile, de la Sol kicks Cesar out of his SUV after an argument over the climate control. Johnson kills Cesar in a shootout and stops de la Sol, but the kingpin flees after bribing the detective with a male enhancement kit. Upon hearing an explosion, Johnson heads to the abandoned restaurant and chases after the gang. He nabs Jordana and reveals to her and Vin that Lucas is an undercover cop. Lucas, instead, handcuffs Johnson to the spoiler of Jordana's Scion tC and walks away with Vin and Jordana while Johnson struggles to grab his bottle of baby oil on the ground. With the cash stowed in the trunks, Lucas and Vin agree to one more race, with Jordana's unborn baby at stake. However, de la Sol arrives, demanding the return of his money, but is run over by a squad car driven by Michelle and Canaro (who have begun a relationship). Lucas, Vin, and Jordana then race off, with Vin arguing with his GPS device after it directs him to a wig shop.

== Cast ==
- Alex Ashbaugh as Officer Lucas White, an undercover police officer who infiltrates a gang of street racers: A parody of Brian O'Conner (Paul Walker). The name Lucas White may also be a reference to Lucas Black, who played Sean Boswell.
- Dale Pavinski as Vin Serento, a criminal and street racer that Lucas befriends: A parody of Dominic Toretto (Vin Diesel).
- Lili Mirojnick as Jordana Serento, Vin's sister and Lucas' love interest: A parody of Mia Toretto (Jordana Brewster).
- Andrea Navedo as Michelle Toritz: A parody of Letty Ortiz (Michelle Rodriguez).
- Daniel Booko as Curtis, Vin's partner: A parody of Vince (Matt Schulze).
- Dio Johnson as Detective Rock Johnson, an elite LAPD detective sent to track Serento's gang: A parody of Luke Hobbs (Dwayne Johnson).
- Rogelio Douglas Jr. as Rapper Cameo, a street racer: A parody of Tej Parker (Ludacris), Roman "Rome" Pearce (Tyrese Gibson), Edwin (Ja Rule), and Twinkie (Bow Wow). His name derives from the said actors who either had major roles or cameos and were also rappers.
- Chris Pang as Cool Asian Guy: A parody of Han Lue (Sung Kang).
- Chanel Celaya as Model Turned Actress: A parody of Gisele Yashar (Gal Gadot). Her name derives from and references Gadot being a former model before becoming an actress.
- Shantel Wislawski as Officer Julie Canaro: A parody of Monica Fuentes (Eva Mendes), Elena Neves (Elsa Pataky), and Riley Hicks (Gina Carano).
- Omar Chaparro as Juan Carlos de la Sol, a drug kingpin: A parody of Arturo Braga (John Ortiz), Hernan Reyes (Joaquim de Almeida), and Carter Verone (Cole Hauser).
- Joseph Julian Soria as Cesar Villacruz: A parody of Fenix Calderon (Laz Alonso) and Zizi (Michael Irby).
- Gonzalo Menendez as Detective Hanover, an LAPD detective and Lucas White's superior: A parody of Sergeant Tanner (Ted Levine) and Agent Bilkins (Thom Barry)
- Amin Joseph as Dre.
- Luis Chavez as Hector.
- Riley Reid as uncredited cameo.
- Cuete Yeska as José.

== Production ==
Filming began in October 2013. Editor Peck Prior

== Release ==
=== Box office ===
Superfast! premiered in Italy on March 5, 2015, where it debuted in the #8 position with US$436,810. It dropped to #13 in its second week and has since ended its run with US$638,268. The film opened on March 12 in the United Arab Emirates, where it finished in the #4 position with US$222,653 from 32 screens and ended its run with US$399,512.

As of March 30, the film's total box office gross is US$2,075,731.

=== Critical response ===
The film has received generally negative reviews from critics. Joe Leydon of Variety commented on his review of the film that "Superfast! takes aim at easy targets, and misses by miles."

Martin Tsai of the Los Angeles Times commented on his review that "While fans can appreciate all the winks and nudges, the film is a wreck for the uninitiated." Brian Orndorf of Blu-ray.com gave the film a score of 2 out of 10, calling it "a brain-dead endeavor, with the helmers returning to their comfort zone of head bonks and fart noises, even throwing in two incidents where a character is struck out of the blue by a speeding car. Perhaps Friedberg and Seltzer are vaudeville enthusiasts. Perhaps they can't dream up an original joke to save their lives. Either way, Superfast is steamrolled by painfully obvious stupidity that's never funny. "

=== Home media ===
The film premiered on VOD and in select theaters on April 3. It was released on DVD in Japan on April 17 by Asmik Ace under the title Wild na Speed! Aho Mission (ワイルドなスピード！AHO MISSION) (a play on Wild Speed, the Japanese title for The Fast and the Furious). In France, the film was released by TF1 Vidéo under the title Superfast 8.
