= Lili Mirojnick =

American actress

- Occupation: Actress
- Years active: 2005–present

Lili Mirojnick is an American actress. She has appeared in guest roles in episodes of various television series, and may be best known for her main cast role as Det. Meredith McCarthy on the Syfy television series Happy!.

== Career ==
Mirojnick has appeared in a number of stage roles.

In 2005, Mirojnick began appearing in uncredited and minor film roles. In 2010, she won the lead role in the independent film Kill the Habit. From 2011–2014, she made a number of guest appearances in network television series including Person of Interest, Blue Bloods and Grey's Anatomy.

Mirojnick stars as Det. Meredith McCarthy in the Syfy series Happy! (2017).

== Personal life ==
Mirojnick resides in Los Angeles, California. She considers herself Jewish but non-religious.

== Filmography ==
=== Film ===
Year	Title	Role	Notes
2005	Domino	Sorority Girl #2	Uncredited
2008	Cloverfield	Lei	
2008	Peripheral Vision	Cindy Johnson	
2009	G-Force	Coat Checker	Uncredited
2009	A Brief History of Women	Heidi	Short film
2010	Kill the Habit	Galia	
2010	The Back-up Plan	Pregnant Woman #2	
2011	Psyche	Roslyn	Short film
2011	Friends with Benefits	Laura	
2011	The Levenger Tapes	Kim	
2012	Born Wild	Joey Daniels	
2013	Meth Head	Nurse Hixon	
2013	Assassins Tale	Fine Young Thing	
2015	Superfast!	Jordana Sorento	
2015	Knotts	Emily	Short film
2018	Waterlily Jaguar	Scarlet	

=== Television ===
Year	Title	Role	Notes
2011	CSI: Crime Scene Investigation	Amber Rowe	Episode: "Man Up"
2011	Person of Interest	Pia Moresco	Episode: "Mission Creep"
2011	#nitTWITS	Wife (as @lilypad13)	Episode: "My AA Meeting"
2011	Rules of Engagement	Female Club-Goer	Episode: "Cheating"
2012	The Glades	Willow Dansen	Episode: "Public Enemy"
2012	Blue Bloods	Angela Ferrara	Episode: "Domestic Disturbance"
2012	Wedding Band	Zoe	Episode: "I Don't Wanna Grow Up"
2013	Grimm	Krystal Fletcher	Episode: "Natural Born Wesen"
2013	Hawaii Five-0	Kammie Leeds	Episode: "Imi Loko Ka 'Uhane"
2013	Grey's Anatomy	Talia	Episode: "Do You Believe in Magic"
2013	My Synthesized Life	Janelle	Episodes: "The Danger Zone" and "Turn the Music Off"
2014	Unforgettable	Tina Forbish	Episode: "Moving On"
2014	Fatrick	Becky	TV movie
2015	Public Morals	Bernadette Tedesco	Episodes: "A Token of Our Appreciation", "Collection Day" and "No Crazies on the Street"
2016	Elementary	Olga Berezhnaya	Episode: "Murder Ex Machina"
2016	Swedish Dicks	Tina	Episode: "The Very Brief Adventures of Maintenance Guy and Plant Man"
2017–2019	Happy!	Det. Meredith McCarthy	Main role
2018	The Good Fight	Dominika Sokolov	Episode: "Day 464"
2018	Beerfest: Thirst for Victory	Melanie	TV movie
2019	Elementary	Olga Berezhnaya	Episode: "From Russia with Drugs"
2021–2022	Ordinary Joe	Kinsley	Recurring role

=== Theatre ===
Play	Role	Director
Landscape of the Body	Joanne	Jonathan Bolt
Dear Brutus	Margaret	James Warwick
Hot L Baltimore	Girl	Jackie Bartone
Trust is Overrated	Allison	Matthew Kemp
The Crucible	Reverend Hale	Steve Rollman
Cabaret	Kit Kat Dancer	Neil Nash
