= Rachel Simmons =

American writer on social behavior (1974-)

- Born: August 10, 1974 (age 51)

Rachel Simmons is an American author of the book Odd Girl Out: The Hidden Culture of Aggression in Girls published in 2002. (ISBN 0156027348)

== Background ==
Simmons graduated from Vassar College and was a Rhodes Scholar at Lincoln College, Oxford where she began studying female aggression. She is a native of Rockville, Maryland, her mother Claire is a Jewish historian and her father Luiz R. S. Simmons is an attorney and was a member of the Maryland General Assembly.

On September 1, 2009, Simmons was interviewed on NBC's The Today Show about her new book "The Curse of the Good Girl". In March 2011, Rachel Simmons gave a speech about empowering girls to Qualters Middle School in Mansfield, Massachusetts to sixth and seventh grade girls.

On April 6, 2015, Simmons was the keynote speaker at the "Educating Girls: Be Well, Lead Well" conference held in New York City and sponsored by the New York State Association of Independent Schools and the National Coalition of Girls Schools.

On 29 June 2015, Simmons featured on episode #255 of the comedian Ari Shaffir's podcast "Ari Shaffir's Skeptic Tank" Simmons and Shaffir attended high school together and reminisced about their past, Simmons also explains the process of artificial insemination and all that goes along with it.

Simmons is the Girls Research Scholar in Residence at The Hewitt School in New York City.

== Films ==
- Odd Girl Out was made into a TV film starring Alexa Vega.
- A Girl's Life, 2009

== Writings ==
- Odd Girl Out: The Hidden Culture of Aggression in Girls. New York: Harcourt, 2002. ISBN 978-0-15-100604-5
- Odd Girl Speaks Out: Girls Write About Bullies, Cliques, Popularity, and Jealousy. Orlando, Fla: Harcourt, 2004. ISBN 978-0-15-602815-8
- The Curse of the Good Girl: Raising Authentic Girls with Courage and Confidence. New York: The Penguin Press, 2009. ISBN 978-1-59420-218-6
- Enough as She Is: How to Help Girls Move Beyond Impossible Standards of Success to Live Healthy, Happy, and Fulfilling Lives: New York: Harper, 2018 ISBN 978-0-06-243839-3
- Perfectionism among teens is rampant (and we’re not helping) Newspaper Article in the Washington Post, January 25, 2018
