= Into the Dark (film) =

2012 American supernatural horror film

- Promotional poster
- Directed by: Mark Edwin Robinson
- Written by: Mark Edwin Robinson
- Produced by: David C. Robinson; Christine Holder; Mark Holder; Danny Roth
- Starring: Mischa Barton; Ryan Eggold; Leah Pipes; Jaz Martin
- Music by: Jesse Voccia
- Distributed by: Sony Pictures Entertainment
- Release dates: October 20, 2012 (Hollywood Film Festival); October 11, 2013
- Country: United States
- Language: English
- Budget: $5 million

Into the Dark, also known as I Will Follow You into the Dark, is a 2012 American supernatural horror film written and directed by Mark Edwin Robinson. The film stars Mischa Barton and Ryan Eggold as lovers separated by supernatural elements. The project went into production in January 2012. The film's original title derives from the Death Cab for Cutie song of the same name. On 14 May 2012, Epic Pictures Group released an international trailer for the film. The film premiered at the Hollywood Film Festival on 20 October 2012, where it was nominated for the Best Feature Film award. The film was released theatrically in the United States on 11 October 2013.

== Plot ==
Sophia Monet is a young woman battling depression after losing both her parents in the last six months. She becomes increasingly isolated and convinces herself that she'll never see her parents again, dismissing any notion of an afterlife. She is drawn out of this flux when she meets a new love interest, Adam Hunt. After Adam's mysterious disappearance, Sophia becomes determined to track him down. Her search leads to an eerie apartment building, where passing the threshold means leaving the living and entering the realm of the dead.

== Cast ==
- Mischa Barton as Sophia Monet
- Ryan Eggold as Adam Hunt
- Jaz Martin as Sam
- Leah Pipes as Astrid
- John Rubinstein as Dr. Thomas
- Frank Ashmore as Mr. Carter
- Jim Tooey as Officer Mason
- Kris Wheeler as Officer Darby
- Talon Reid as Tortured soul
- Zack Tiegen as Tom
- Jessee Foudray as Funeral Goer with Baby
- Willow Hale as Ghost Mother

== Release ==
In May 2012, Screen Daily reported that Epic Pictures Group made several deals that license the film for overseas distribution. The film will be released by Tiberius Film in Germany, Eagle in the Middle East and EuroFilms for Peru, Ecuador and Bolivia.

== Reception ==
On the review aggregator website Rotten Tomatoes, 20% of 10 critics' reviews are positive, with an average rating of 3.1/10.
