= Odd Girl Out =

2005 television film directed by Tom McLoughlin

- DVD cover
- Based on: Odd Girl Out: The Hidden Culture of Aggression in Girls by Rachel Simmons
- Screenplay by: Matthew McDuffie
- Directed by: Tom McLoughlin
- Starring: Alexa Vega; Lisa Vidal; Leah Pipes; Elizabeth Rice; Shari Dyon Perry; Shannon Fleming; Alicia Morton; Rhoda Griffis
- Theme music composer: Mark Snow
- Country of origin: United States
- Original language: English

Production
- Producer: Randi Richmond
- Running time: 84 minutes

Original release
- Network: Lifetime
- Release: April 4, 2005

Odd Girl Out is a 2005 drama telefilm starring Alexa Vega, Lisa Vidal, Elizabeth Rice, Alicia Morton, Leah Pipes, Shari Dyon Perry, Joey Nappo, and Chad Biagini. First aired April 4, 2005 on Lifetime, the film is based on the book Odd Girl Out: The Hidden Culture of Aggression in Girls by Rachel Simmons. It sheds light onto the topic of school bullying among school girls.

== Plot ==
Vanessa Snyder (Alexa Vega) is a beautiful and intelligent eighth-grader who is best friends with queen bee Stacey Larson (Leah Pipes) and Nikki Rodriguez (Elizabeth Rice), who is secretly jealous of the bond between the two. Outside of the clique is the kindhearted outcast Emily (Shari Dyon Perry), and the "wannabe" Tiffany Thompson (Alicia Morton), who desires to become part of the group. Vanessa's loving divorced mother Barbara (Lisa Vidal) is proud of her esteemed daughter.

One day, Nikki tricks Vanessa into getting close to Tony (Chad Biagini), a boy whom Stacey (and somewhat Vanessa) has a crush on. Vanessa is subsequently ostracized from the posse and Tiffany is allowed in, becoming Nikki's sidekick. Stacey pretends to still be Vanessa's friend, all the while enabling the abuse against her, including during gym class. The clique, along with a boy named Ezra (Joey Nappo) who once fought Tony, also creates a website called "Hating Vanessa" in which students post insulting content about her. Although Emily encourages Vanessa to not run back to the clique, she tries to make amends but is rebuffed. Vanessa hides in one of the bathroom stalls and the clique, knowing she is there, arrives in the bathroom and gossip about her. That night, she cuts most of her hair off and skips school the next day, fearing being mocked for her new look. Barbara addresses the bullying with Stacey's mother, Denise (Rhoda Griffis), who trivializes it.

When her mother confronts her for being truant, Vanessa shows Barbara printed-out insults that the girls have made about her online. Barbara goes to the school to address the situation to the principal Miss Jessup (Margo Moorer), who says that she cannot punish verbal abuse. Meanwhile, Stacey has made it appear that Vanessa copied her assignment when it was actually vice versa; it is resolved by the two girls and their mothers with Miss Jessup. Vanessa's spirits are suddenly lifted when she is told that she is still invited to Stacey's birthday party and that it is being changed to the following night. She and Barbara arrive at a club, where the party supposedly is, but it turns out that Stacey lied, causing Vanessa to break down and attempt suicide by overdosing on sleeping pills. She is taken to the emergency room and subsequently treated. During a class session, Emily accuses Stacey of nearly killing Vanessa by her actions and is the only one of her peers to visit her in the hospital and befriend her. Back at home, Barbara comes upon a group chat, where some students at the school taunt Vanessa and actually urge her to kill herself. Barbara prints out these messages and gives them to Miss Jessup, who suspends Nikki, Tiffany and Ezra from school for a week while setting up a new policy.

Upon returning to school, Vanessa and Stacey reunite and chat online after the latter apologizes for everything. Stacey sends the chat to Nikki, who prints it out and derisively reads it with Tiffany's help to Vanessa in the crowded hallway after the graduation ceremony. Vanessa confronts Stacey in front of everyone, seeing right through her lies. Tony and everyone else applauds as a humiliated Stacey walks out of the school, disbanding the bullying clique. Barbara watches with pride as Vanessa and Emily hug and leave together for an after-party.

== Cast ==
- Alexa Vega as Vanessa Snyder
- Lisa Vidal as Barbara Snyder
- Leah Pipes as Stacey Larson
- Elizabeth Rice as Nikki Rodriguez
- Shari Dyon Perry as Emily
- Alicia Morton as Tiffany Thompson
- Joey Nappo as Ezra
- Rhoda Griffis as Denise Larson
- Nancy McLoughlin as Ms. Donnely
- Margo Moorer as Miss Jessup
- Chad Biagini as Tony
- Micheal Arata as Dave Larson

== Release ==
The film was released on DVD in 2006 by Lionsgate. On July 31, 2012, the film was re-released in a package of 4 Lifetime original movies on DVD titled Surviving High School.
