= Mission Creep (Person of Interest) =

- Person of Interest episode
- Episode no.: Season 1 Episode 3
- Directed by: Steven DePaul
- Written by: Patrick Harbinson
- Cinematography by: Richard Rutkowski
- Editing by: Scott Lerner
- Production code: 2J6203
- Original air date: October 6, 2011
- Running time: 44 minutes

Guest appearances
- James Carpinello as Joey Durban; Keith Nobbs as Straub; Vincent Laresca as Detective Molina; Susan Misner as Jessica Arndt; Lili Mirojnick as Pia Moresco; Charles Borland as Banker; Ruben Santiago-Hudson as Sam Latimer

Episode chronology
← Previous "Ghosts"	Next → "Cura Te Ipsum"

"Mission Creep" is the third episode of the first season of the American television drama series Person of Interest. It is the 3rd overall episode of the series and is written by Patrick Harbinson and directed by Steven DePaul. It aired on CBS in the United States and on CTV in Canada on October 6, 2011.

== Plot ==
=== Flashbacks ===
In flashbacks to 2006, Reese (Jim Caviezel) runs into Jessica (Susan Misner) at an airport, having returned from an overseas job. He finds out that she is now engaged. Jessica says she waited for him. Reese replies that he didn't ask her to. She says he decided that he was afraid he would get killed over there and leave her alone and unhappy. Then she says that it was easier for him to be alone. Reese responds that it's something you learn over there, "In the end, we're all alone. And no one's coming to save you." Reese tells her to be happy with Peter but Jessica asks him to tell her to wait for him. Reese says nothing, but as Jessica walks away out of earshot, he says, “Wait for me. Please.”

=== Present day ===
Reese and Finch (Michael Emerson) get the number of Joey Durban (James Carpinello), a soldier who has just returned from Afghanistan who now works as a doorman. After cloning his phone, Reese follows Joey to a bank. There, he finds Joey and a gang robbing the bank. He prevents a guard from shooting them and they escape with the money.

Following Joey, Reese finds him giving money to a woman despite having a fiancée named Pia Moresco (Lili Mirojnick). He also finds Joey receiving money from a taxi driver who is also from Joey's infantry division. Analyzing the stops, they find a bar owner Sam Latimer (Ruben Santiago-Hudson), a Gulf War veteran who was also in Joey's division. Reese visits Latimer, claiming to be a soldier wanting to join the gang. When he is refused entry due to lack of space, Finch plants a gun on one of the members to get him arrested so that Reese can be given a place on the team.

Detective Carter (Taraji P. Henson) is shown the footage of Reese stopping the guard in the bank and wonders whether he was involved in the robbery. Investigating the footage, she discovers an exclusive military radio that was stolen from Fort Drum six months ago. Reese finds Joey, and he reveals that after returning to the country, he wanted to have success but the gang had control over him and forced him to carry out robberies. Later, the gang infiltrates a casino for a heist. However, Carter and the NYPD have already identified the radio and locates one of the gang members, forcing them to leave without the money.

Reese and Finch find that the woman whom Joey was meeting had a husband in his division who was killed in Afghanistan. The soldier died when he replaced Joey on his position, and Joey feels responsible for his family, delivering money for them without the knowledge of his fiancée. As a last heist, the gang must infiltrate the NYPD evidence locker to retrieve a file from the lockup. Finch also intercepts a message from Latimer stating he will kill the team but is unable to alert Reese as his cellphone is fried before the heist in order to prevent interception .

With no option, Finch arrives at the evidence room and is taken hostage by the team with Reese acting as his captor. He tells him about Latimer's plan but it's too late. The team retrieves a file that reads "Elias, M." Two of the gang give the package to Latimer who kills them both and escapes. Reese and Joey manage to evade NYPD as well. Reese gives Joey money so he can leave New York with Pia to start a new life. Carter uses the radio to communicate with Reese, confronting him about the recent events but Reese does not expose himself. Reese and Finch track down Latimer, finding him murdered in an apartment after previously handing over the file.

== Reception ==
=== Viewers ===
In its original American broadcast, "Mission Creep" was seen by an estimated 11.57 million household viewers and gained a 2.6/6 ratings share among adults aged 18–49, according to Nielsen Media Research. This was an 8% decrease in viewership from the previous episode, which was watched by 12.51 million viewers with a 2.7/7 in the 18-49 demographics. With these ratings, Person of Interest was the third most watched show on CBS for the night behind The Mentalist and The Big Bang Theory, third in its timeslot and sixth for the night in the 18-49 demographics, behind The Mentalist, Grey's Anatomy, The Office, The X Factor, and The Big Bang Theory.

=== Critical reviews ===
"Mission Creep" received generally positive reviews from critics. Zack Handlen of The A.V. Club gave the episode a "C+" rating and wrote "Person of Interest doesn't need to be the next great drama on television to be effectively entertaining, but if it's going to keep churning out B-level plots like this one, it needs to do more with its two leads. (I'm not sure what you can do with Det. Carter. She's basically just a superfluous expository device at this point, and unless she starts feeding Reese and Finch information, there's no real reason to keep her around.) Reese on his own isn't much fun, but he and Finch play off each other well, and the series would be smart to try and get them in more scenes together, as opposed to Reese running around on the street while Finch hides in his abandoned library. As far as ratings go, the series is pulling solid, if not spectacular numbers, which, unless something drastic happens, gives it good odds for sticking around the full year. If it does, I hope they realize that Finch is the best edge they've got and act accordingly. Too many more episodes like this one, and I might forget to watch completely."

Ross Bonaime of Paste gave the episode a 7 out of 10 rating and wrote "'Mission Creep,' this week's episode of Person of Interest, finally feels like the show is creating a path for itself in where it will attempt to go. The first two episodes were monotonous, boring and not as interested in character. Person of Interest still definitely has problems, but for once it seems like it's trying to solve them." Morgan Jeffery of Digital Spy wrote "'Mission Creep' is another strong episode of Person of Interest. In fact, it's probably the show's strongest instalment so far - there's a solid, straight-forward plot, nice moments of character development and the usual batch of exciting action scenes."
