= Crime & Punishment (1993 TV series) =

American television series

- Created by: Dick Wolf
- Written by: Dick Wolf; Alfonse Ruggiero Jr.; Sally Nemeth; Michael Duggan; Carol Flint; Mark St. Germain
- Directed by: James Frawley; Daniel Sackheim
- Starring: Jon Tenney; Rachel Ticotin; Carmen Argenziano; Lisa Darr; María Celedonio
- Music by: Mike Post
- Country of origin: United States
- Original language: English
- No. of seasons: 1
- No. of episodes: 6

Production
- Executive producers: Dick Wolf; Michael Duggan
- Producer: Daniel Sackheim
- Cinematography: Roy H. Wagner
- Editors: Kevin Krasny; Laurie Grotstein; Chip Masamitu
- Running time: 48–49 minutes
- Production companies: Wolf Films; NBC Entertainment

Original release
- Network: NBC
- Release: March 3 – April 7, 1993

Crime & Punishment is a police drama television program created by Dick Wolf that ran for 6 episodes on NBC from March 3, 1993, to April 7, 1993. With the exceptions of the first and last episodes, which aired on Wednesdays, the show occupied the 10 p.m. slot of the network's Thursday-night "The Best Night of Television on Television" programming block, a timeslot occupied for the rest of the 1992–1993 season by L.A. Law.

== Premise ==
Crime & Punishment followed a "case-of-the-week" format, centering around two LAPD detectives, Ken O'Donnell (Jon Tenney) and Annette Rey (Rachel Ticotin), and their superior officer, Lt. Anthony Bartolo (Carmen Argenziano). Subplots were also developed around O'Donnell's relationship with his long-term girlfriend, a medical student named Jen Sorenson (Lisa Darr), and Rey's relationship with her estranged 17-year-old daughter, Tanya (María Celedonio).

The program was also notable for including documentary-style "talking-head" segments, wherein the characters are interviewed by an unseen "Interrogator" (voiced by James Sloyan) to reveal their inner thoughts. The "Interrogator" segments were disliked by critics; Ken Tucker of Entertainment Weekly said they "stop the action dead and ruin any ambivalence or subtlety we might read into the characters", while Tony Scott, in Variety, called the device "pretentious and disruptive".

== Cast ==
- Jon Tenney as Det. Ken O'Donnell
- Rachel Ticotin as Det. Annette Rey
- Carmen Argenziano as Lt. Anthony Bartolo
- Lisa Darr as Jan Sorenson, a medical intern and Ken's girlfriend
- María Celedonio as Tanya Rey, Annette's estranged daughter
- James Sloyan (voice) as the Interrogator

=== Guest stars ===
- Brandon Quintin Adams as Harold Carr ("Right to Bear Arms")
- Xander Berkeley as Michael Vetta ("Simple Trust")
- Susan Brown as Gayle O'Donnell, Ken's mother ("Our Denial")
- David Burke as Sean ("Our Denial")
- Nick Cassavetes as Phil Cooper ("Simple Trust")
- Frances Fisher as Jeannette Henderson ("Fire with Fire")
- Steven Gilborn as John O'Donnell, Ken's father ("Our Denial")
- John Glover as Dennis Atwood ("Best Laid Plans")
- Lauren Lane as Deanna Atlee ("Simple Trust")
- Robert Picardo as Bill Reverdy ("School Ties")

== Episodes ==
| No. | Episode Title | Written by | Airdate | Prod. Code |
|---|---|---|---|---|
| 1 | "Best Laid Plans" | Dick Wolf | March 3, 1993 | 001 |
| 2 | "Right to Bear Arms" | Alfonse Ruggiero Jr. | March 4, 1993 | 006 |
| 3 | "Simple Trust" | Mark St. Germain | March 11, 1993 | 002 |
| 4 | "Our Denial" | Michael Duggan (teleplay); Michael Duggan and Carol Flint (story) | March 18, 1993 | 003 |
| 5 | "School Ties" | Sally Nemeth | March 25, 1993 | 004 |
| 6 | "Fire with Fire" | Carol Flint (teleplay); Carol Flint and Michael Duggan (story) | April 7, 1993 | 005 |

== Awards and nominations ==
| Year | Award | Category | Recipient | Episode | Result |
|---|---|---|---|---|---|
| 1993 | Emmy Award | Outstanding Guest Actor in a Drama Series | John Glover | "Best Laid Plans" | Nominated |
