= Breaking Dawn (2004 film) =

American film by Mark Edwin Robinson

- Promotional poster
- Directed by: Mark Edwin Robinson
- Written by: Mark Edwin Robinson
- Produced by: David C. Robinson; Brady Nasfell
- Starring: Kelly Overton; James Haven; Sarah-Jane Potts
- Cinematography: Ken Glassing
- Edited by: Natalie Ebnet
- Music by: Jason Nyberg
- Distributed by: Lionsgate Home Entertainment
- Release date: 2004
- Country: United States
- Language: English

Breaking Dawn is a 2004 American independent horror-thriller film written and directed by Mark Edwin Robinson. It is the directorial debut of Robinson, who was 22 at the time and saw the film showcased at the Cannes Film Festival, Marché du Film and at The Hollywood Film Festival. The film stars Kelly Overton and James Haven.

== Plot ==
Dawn, a young medical student is charged with uncovering the murder of a mental patient's mother. The patient, Don, holds many secrets and disturbs Dawn with his insane ramblings. As Dawn continues to investigate the murder, she believes Don's paranoia is out of control at the mention of a menacing figure named Malachi. She begins to question whether Malachi exists when she is stalked by a mysterious figure or if her imagination and Don's craziness are affecting her judgment.

== Cast ==
- Kelly Overton as Dawn
- James Haven as Don Wake
- Sarah-Jane Potts as Anna
- Hank Harris as Ted
- Edie McClurg as Nurse Olivia
- Kathryn Joosten as Neighbor
- Isaac C. Singleton Jr. as Attendant Rufus
- Diane Venora as Mother
- Joe Morton as Prof. Simon
- Dave Ruby as Opie
- Jennette McCurdy as Little Girl

== Production ==
The film was shot over 18 days on 35 mm film in California.

=== Music ===
The only song heard during the film is Here to Stay by Colombian-American composer and interpreter Arthur Yoria at the closing credits.
