= The Levenger Tapes =

- Promotional poster
- Directed by: Mark Edwin Robinson
- Written by: Mark Edwin Robinson
- Produced by: David C. Robinson; Danny Roth
- Starring: Johanna Braddy; Lili Mirojnick; Morgan Krantz; Chris Mulkey
- Cinematography: Magdalena Górka
- Edited by: Matt Michael
- Distributed by: New Films International
- Release date: September 2011 (Temecula)
- Running time: 90 minutes
- Country: United States
- Language: English

The Levenger Tapes is a 2011 American horror-thriller film written and directed by Mark Edwin Robinson. The film premiered at the Temecula Valley International Film Festival in September 2011 and will be distributed by New Films International.

== Plot ==
After three college students go missing, detectives discover a disturbing tape that they hope will provide clues to their whereabouts. The footage of the students takes a chilling turn when they discover the bloodied dress of a young girl in the wilderness. The detectives link the missing students case and the young girl together and hope to find them all alive.

== Cast ==
- Johanna Braddy as Amanda
- Lili Mirojnick as Kim
- Morgan Krantz as Chase
- Chris Mulkey as Stackman
- Tom Virtue as Gallagher
- Maria Olsen as Screaming Lady
- John Rosenfeld as Rooney
