= Miracle Run =

- Region 2 DVD cover
- Written by: Mike Maples
- Directed by: Gregg Champion
- Starring: Mary-Louise Parker; Aidan Quinn; Zac Efron; Bubba Lewis; Alicia Morton
- Theme music composer: Joseph Conlan
- Country of origin: United States
- Original language: English

Production
- Producers: John J. Anderson; Randi Richmond
- Cinematography: Gordon Lonsdale
- Editor: Gib Jaffe
- Running time: 96 minutes

Original release
- Network: Lifetime Movie Network
- Release: August 9, 2004

Miracle Run is a 2004 Lifetime Television film starring Mary-Louise Parker, Zac Efron, Bubba Lewis, Aidan Quinn and Alicia Morton.

== Plot ==
In a flashback, a single mother, Corrine Morgan-Thomas (Mary-Louise Parker) drives her seven-year-old twin boys Steven (Jake Cherry) and Philip (Jeremy Shada) to the doctor's office and learns that they have autism. Philip simply repeats what he hears others say, a condition known as echolalia, while Steven is completely nonverbal. After leaving the clinic in a very upset mood, she takes the boys shopping for groceries. Her visit to the supermarket is not a pleasant one, as her two boys begin screaming throughout the store and Steven wets himself, causing others to stare at them. Upon learning about their condition, her live-in boyfriend leaves because he knows raising twins with a mental disability will be difficult.

Corrine then moves with her boys to another town and enrolls them in a public school. Their classmates are puzzled by their strange behavior, as well as their teachers. Corrine is then told at a meeting by the principal as well as several psychiatrists that they are not fit for public school, and that they will be sent to a special school. The local mental hospital then sends a learning therapist to their house in order to teach the boys basic language skills and prepare them for normal society. With his help and support, Philip's vocabulary expands, and Steven says his very first word, "Pizza".

After he is done with teaching the boys, the psychiatrist moves to another city to work with other families. Over the course of several years, the boys flourish verbally, socially, and academically. However, some of their autistic characteristics still remain, as they have somewhat nasal, robot-like voices, engage in self-injurious habits, and are very sensitive to loud and sudden noises. They also have an obsession with Rocky from the Rocky films. On their first day of high school, Steven (Zac Efron) develops a crush on a girl named Jennifer (Alicia Morton). While chatting with Philip (Bubba Lewis) in the bathroom, Steven talks about Jennifer and says "Maybe she'll be my girlfriend." Another boy, an older boy with long hair, mocks Steven and pushes him, causing both of them to start screaming and crying.

Corrine is called to the school from work by their special ed teacher, and convinces the boys to come out of the bathroom and go to lunch. At lunch, Jennifer decides to sit with the two boys. Steven sees several joggers outside from the hallway and decides to join the cross country team. Before the race, Steven sees Jennifer kiss another guy. Steven is hurt and confused. Corrine finds Steven sitting down on the grass looking sad, and she finds a love poem in his hands that Steven wrote for Jennifer. Then, Steven realizes he has to move on. He wins the first race he runs in and Philip gets into a special music school by playing his newfound guitar talent over the phone. Corrine then founds The Miracle Run Foundation for research into autism. Steven gives a speech about how his mother helped him and his brother with their autism. As the audience applauds at his speech, the credits mention about their lives from thereon and this ends the movie.

== Cast ==
- Mary-Louise Parker as Corrine Morgan-Thomas
- Aidan Quinn as Douglas Thomas
- Zac Efron as Steven Morgan
  - Jake Cherry as Young Steven Morgan
- Bubba Lewis as Philip Morgan
  - Jeremy Shada as Young Philip Morgan
- Alicia Morton as Jennifer Michaels

== Locations ==
The movie was filmed in New Orleans, Louisiana. The High School campus scenes were filmed at Holy Cross High School's original campus (Holy Cross High School relocated to a new campus due to Hurricane Katrina). The scenes with the cross country running were filmed in New Orleans City Park.

== See also ==
- List of films about the sport of athletics
