= 90210 (TV series) =

2008 American teen drama television series

- Genre: Teen drama
- Based on: Beverly Hills, 90210 by Darren Star
- Developed by: Rob Thomas; Gabe Sachs; Jeff Judah
- Starring: Rob Estes; Shenae Grimes; Tristan Wilds; AnnaLynne McCord; Dustin Milligan; Ryan Eggold; Jessica Stroup; Michael Steger; Lori Loughlin; Jessica Walter; Jessica Lowndes; Matt Lanter; Trevor Donovan; Gillian Zinser
- Theme music composer: Liz Phair; Marc Dauer; Evan Frankfort
- Country of origin: United States
- Original language: English
- No. of seasons: 5
- No. of episodes: 114 (list of episodes)

Production
- Executive producers: Gabe Sachs; Jeff Judah; Rebecca Sinclair; Patricia Carr; Lara Olsen; David S. Rosenthal; Rob Thomas; Mark Piznarski
- Producers: Shana Stein; Michael Pendell; Marjorie David; Tod Hammel; Wendey Stanzler; Paul Sciarrotta; Robert M. Rolsky; Sean Reycraft; D. Howard Grisby; Scott Weinger; Bob Roisky
- Production locations: Beverly Hills, California; Mount St. Mary's College; Raleigh Manhattan Beach Studios; Tropicana Bar
- Running time: 36–42 minutes
- Production companies: Sachs/Judah Productions (2008–2009) (season 1); CBS Productions (2008–2012) (seasons 1–4); CBS Television Studios (2012–2013) (season 5)

Original release
- Network: The CW
- Release: September 2, 2008 – May 13, 2013

Related
- Beverly Hills, 90210; Melrose Place; Models Inc.; Melrose Place (2009 TV series); BH90210

90210 is an American teen drama television series developed by Rob Thomas, Gabe Sachs and Jeff Judah for The CW. It originally aired from September 2, 2008, to May 13, 2013, and is the fourth series in the franchise created by Darren Star.

Like its predecessor, the show follows the lives of several wealthy students attending West Beverly Hills High School in Beverly Hills, California. The show later focuses on the same group of friends when they graduate and begin their lives in the adult world. Some attend college at California University, while others begin exploring avenues beyond post-secondary education.

The show originally revolved around the Wilson family, including new Beverly Hills residents Annie Wilson (Shenae Grimes) and Dixon Wilson (Tristan Wilds). Their father, Harrison Wilson (Rob Estes) returns from Wichita, Kansas, to his Beverly Hills childhood home with his family to care for his mother, former television and theatre actress Tabitha Wilson (Jessica Walter), who has a drinking problem and clashes with his wife Debbie Wilson (Lori Loughlin). Annie and Dixon struggle to adjust to their new lives while making friends and adhering to their parents' wishes.

During the first two seasons, cast members from the original series made appearances reprising their roles, including Jennie Garth, Shannen Doherty, Tori Spelling, Joe E. Tata, and Ann Gillespie. After the second season, however, they were not featured and rarely mentioned. The primary connection between the two series was the new series' character of Erin Silver (Jessica Stroup), the half-sister of Kelly Taylor and David Silver from the original series.

== Series overview ==
Season	Episodes	Originally released	
Season	Episodes	First released	Last released
1	24	September 2, 2008	May 19, 2009
2	22	September 8, 2009	May 18, 2010
3	22	September 13, 2010	May 16, 2011
4	24	September 13, 2011	May 15, 2012
5	22	October 8, 2012	May 13, 2013

Inter-title used in the first season of the series

The series introduces the Wilson family moving to Beverly Hills and the kids Annie and Dixon adjusting to a new town and school. Annie befriends Naomi Clark, who is dating jock Ethan Ward, but soon breaks up with him. Annie and Ethan then pursue a relationship after having dated the summer prior to Annie moving to Beverly Hills when Annie was visiting her grandmother for the summer. Naomi later becomes attracted to a bartender named Liam Court and dates him, only to figure out he's simultaneously interested in Annie.

Fallen starlet Adrianna Tate-Duncan battles a drug addiction, which causes extra trouble when Naomi takes blame for the drugs. She begins a relationship with Navid Shirazi, head of the school's paper, who paid for her rehab.

Erin Silver, Naomi's former best friend, also befriends Annie and tells her Naomi can't be trusted. She forms a relationship with Dixon and finds out she has bi-polar disorder.

== Cast and characters ==
Character	Actor	Seasons				
Character	Actor	1	2	3	4	5
Harry Wilson	Rob Estes	Main	Main			
Annie Wilson	Shenae Grimes	Main	Main	Main	Main	Main
Dixon Wilson	Tristan Wilds	Main	Main	Main	Main	Main
Naomi Clark	AnnaLynne McCord	Main	Main	Main	Main	Main
Ethan Ward	Dustin Milligan	Main				
Ryan Matthews	Ryan Eggold	Main	Main	Main		
Erin Silver	Jessica Stroup	Main	Main	Main	Main	Main
Navid Shirazi	Michael Steger	Main	Main	Main	Main	Main
Debbie Wilson	Lori Loughlin	Main	Main	Main		Guest
Tabitha Wilson	Jessica Walter	Main (Note: Walter departs in "Love Me or Leave Me" (episode 1.13).)				
Adrianna Tate-Duncan	Jessica Lowndes	Main (Note: Lowndes appeared in a recurring role in season 1, before joining the main cast in "By Accident" (episode 1.14).)	Main	Main	Main	Main
Liam Court	Matt Lanter	Recurring	Main	Main	Main	Main
Teddy Montgomery	Trevor Donovan		Recurring	Main	Recurring	Recurring
Ivy Sullivan	Gillian Zinser		Recurring	Main	Main	

=== Characters ===
The first actor to be cast was Dustin Milligan on April 1, 2008, followed by AnnaLynne McCord on April 14. Sachs found Milligan to be "really funny", and changed Ethan to better represent his personality. McCord was cast because, according to Sachs, "she's someone who is worldly, and there's a sophistication to her that's interesting". The role of Annie was given to Shenae Grimes, who says she was raised watching the original series. Sachs and Judah had seen Grimes' work before and knew "she had the acting chops", and she was cast after acting a dramatic scene which she "just killed". Sachs stated, "she can act, she's beautiful, and she can give this sweet cuteness [that lets us see] through her eyes into this world."

Lori Loughlin auditioned for the role of Debbie and was given the part straight away. Sachs thought that Loughlin was too established to read for the part, but realized that she understood the role immediately. The producers were fans of Jessica Walter after watching her film, Play Misty for Me. Sachs found that Walter knew pieces of scenes, and suggested "stuff that works". Sachs described Ryan Eggold, who portrayed Matthews, as "a sophisticated actor, and he's also very funny". Sachs believed that every time Eggold would be on screen, "people are going to go, 'Wow!'". The producers were looking for an actor who could portray Silver as a "quirky kid who moves to her own beat". Sachs explained that Jessica Stroup "came in dressed for the part, artsy and quirky, and she had her hair up and she had a bandanna. She nailed it." The producers were fans of Tristan Wilds for his acting on The Wire, and hoped to hire him as Dixon from the start of casting. When asked about Michael Steger, who portrays Navid, Sachs said "he's just great". Rob Estes, the last actor to join the series, was a previous cast member of the first Beverly Hills, 90210 spin-off, Melrose Place. Estes was sought by The CW to play Harry, but was contracted on the drama Women's Murder Club. When that series was canceled, Sachs called Estes and explained the spin-off to him, and he thought it was a great idea. Sachs promised that although he was playing a parent, he would not "be furniture... as in the seldom seen or heard parents who populate many youth-centric series, like the Walsh parents on the original 90210."

The CW confirmed that Jennie Garth, Shannen Doherty, Tori Spelling and Joe E. Tata would be returning in recurring roles as their original characters. Sachs was familiar with Garth, and talked to her about a possible role in the series. Garth agreed to star on the series without reading a script after brainstorming ideas with Sachs. The producers offered Garth a role as a series regular, but she opted to sign on as a recurring character. Doherty decided to appear after talking with Sachs, but her appearance was moved to the second episode. Sachs described Tata's casting as an accident; a friend told Sachs that he had seen Tata in a store, which led to the offer of a recurring role in the series. Sachs said that Tata was ecstatic about the idea and agreed. After reading the script, Spelling expressed interest in returning, and the writers decided to give her character her own fashion line. Spelling was scheduled to appear in the première, but for personal reasons and the birth of her daughter, she opted to appear later in the season.

== Production ==
=== Conception ===
Once pitched, the project was put on the fast track by The CW, and an order of the pilot was expected by the end of the month. The Beverly Hills, 90210 creator, Darren Star, was announced to not be involved with the project. The only surviving element from the original series was believed to be Creative Artists Agency, the talent agency which conceived the spin-off idea. Veronica Mars creator Rob Thomas was in negotiations to write the pilot and Mark Piznarski was in talks to direct it.

=== Development ===
A detailed breakdown of the pilot written by Thomas was released on March 17, 2008, containing information on the plot and characters which would be in the series. None of the characters were related to the original series of 90210 which again aired a quite few years before, except Erin Silver played by Jessica Stroup; however, the new series featured a similar premise: a family with two teenagers who recently moved from the Midwest to Beverly Hills. To reflect the situation at the Beverly Hills school, where around 40 percent of the students were of Persian descent, a student named Navid Shirazi was created. Thomas intended to introduce The Peach Pit, the diner from Beverly Hills, 90210, but noted that it would not be featured in the pilot. The writer considered giving the siblings a job at a movie theater, as he did not want them to use their parents' credit cards. Thomas revealed that there were plans to reintroduce one of the original cast members, but had not met with any of them to discuss a role. Thomas later elaborated the producers wanted to see "as many of the original cast members as possible", but were careful not to "parade them all out in the pilot".

On April 14, 2008, Thomas announced that he was sidelining the series to focus on his two pilots for ABC. Gabe Sachs and Jeff Judah were hired as the new executive producers and wrote a new version of the script in late April. Sachs said that although Thomas had a "great script", their version of the script was edgier. Judah said that they were trying to ground their script in reality, with real character stories and emotional stories. The writers wanted the audience to relate to the characters' problems, which they wanted to be truthful and emotional, but also comedic. The pair were interested in telling several stories simultaneously, featuring many characters. The pair changed the surname of the main family from Mills to Wilson, along with changing the name of the mother from Celia to Debbie. The pair also told reporters that they would be adding their "comedic impulses" to the script. Sachs and Judah found the parents to be an important part of the series, and designed to be contemporary parents. Since the producers were both fathers, they designed the script to include more prominent adult story lines and a strong point of view on parenting. Judah was interested in focusing on how the family kept their moral center when moving to Beverly Hills, and the way the parents dealt with their teenagers. On May 11, 2008, one day before The CW's upfront presentations, the network officially picked up the series for the 2008–2009 television season.

Despite the first season having the highest ratings of the entire series run, the show was largely considered unsuccessful during its first season. The characters were a hit. After disagreeing with the network executives over the series' storylines, Sachs and Judah ended their tenure as producers. The CW wanted the series to have a female perspective and focus more on teenage life and glamour; however, Judah and Sachs were more comfortable writing for men, featuring family stories. The studio brought in Rebecca Rand Kirshner Sinclair, co-executive producer of the popular show Gilmore Girls, to revamp the failing 90210. Sinclair is largely credited for saving the show, which had steady ratings in its third season. For the remainder of the first season, Judah worked in post-production, including editing and music supervision, while Sachs ran the production on set. Rebecca Sinclair began retooling the series as head writer and formally took over the show at the start of season two. In late February 2009, Sinclair signed a seven-figure deal with the producers to serve as executive producer/showrunner for the series' second and third seasons.

On February 16, 2010, The CW renewed the show for a third season. It was also moved to Mondays at 8/7c. On April 26, 2011, The CW renewed the show for a fourth season. On March 17, 2011, it was revealed that Sinclair would step down as executive producer when her contract expired at the end of season three. It was later announced that former Life Unexpected executive producers Patti Carr and Lara Olsen had been hired to take over the series. The show also returned to its debut timeslot, Tuesdays at 8:00 p.m. On May 3, 2012, The CW officially renewed 90210 for a fifth season.

On January 13, 2013, CW president Mark Pedowitz stated that though the show hadn't had a season 6 renewal in place, the show would most likely be back the following year for what would've been its final season as he said he was a "big believer in giving fans a very satisfactory conclusion" for a long-running show However, on February 28, 2013, the announcement came that the fifth season would be its last.

=== Casting ===
On March 13, 2008, Kristin Dos Santos of E! confirmed that the series would be a spin-off with new characters and not a remake. In order for the project to be ready for the network's "upfront" presentations to advertisers in May, casting began before the script was completed.

==== Recurring ====
Original series actors Shannen Doherty, Jennie Garth and Joe E. Tata signed on for recurring roles during early production. Sachs was familiar with Garth, and talked to her about a possible role in the series. Garth agreed to work in the series without reading a script after brainstorming ideas with Sachs. Initially, the producers offered Garth a role as a series regular but, she opted to sign on as recurring instead. Sachs met with Doherty over dinner and told her about the 90210 spin-off. Over the next few weeks, they established Brenda's backstory as a 'name' stage actress and Doherty agreed to guest-star in several episodes, appearing in the credits during the first half-season. Otherwise, Doherty only appeared in supporting roles.

From early on in the news reports of the upcoming series through most of the summer, it was reported that along with Doherty and Garth, Tori Spelling would be reprising her role as an older alumni of West Beverly Hills High. After reading the script, Tori Spelling expressed interest returning, and the writers decided to give Donna her own fashion line. Spelling was scheduled to appear in the premiere, but for personal reasons and the birth of her daughter, she opted to appear later in the season. Backdrop retail store signage in the first several episodes during shopping excursions scenes and one setup line referring to her role foreshadowed the role that would be unfulfilled. By August 11, it was reported that Spelling left the series after discovering that she was receiving less pay than Garth and Doherty. Spelling asked for her salary of $20,000 per episode to be increased to match their salaries—$40,000 to $50,000 per episode—but when denied she left the show altogether.

==== Regulars ====
The first actor to be cast was Dustin Milligan as lacrosse player Ethan Ward, followed by AnnaLynne McCord as Naomi Clark. The role of aspiring actress Annie Wilson, won by Shenae Grimes, was originally offered to Hilary Duff, who turned it down due to dissatisfaction with the pilot script.

Jessica Lowndes was selected to portray actress and singer Adrianna Tate-Duncan, introduced as a theater performer who once had a drug addiction, and would also go through a teen pregnancy and many other serious conflicts as a dark character with many lovable aspects. The Adrianna Tate-Duncan role had been upgraded to a starring role in Jessica Walters' spot, Tristan Wilds was cast as the brother to Annie Wilson; Lori Loughlin won the role of their mother, photographer wife Debbie Wilson. Michael Steger was cast as the school television news director and congenial very nice guy, Navid Shirazi who maintained the nice-guy status throughout all 114 episodes (2008–2013) of generally being walked on or victimized. Rob Estes was chosen for the part of Harry Wilson and only appeared in the first two seasons. Estes was a previous cast member of the first Beverly Hills, 90210 spin-off, Melrose Place.

=== New direction ===
Sinclair announced in March 2009 that the series' second season would rely less on 90210 alums like Jennie Garth and Shannen Doherty to boost ratings. She felt that "the show tried to be a lot of things to a lot of people in its first season [...] I think the center lies with the generation of kids that are in high school now." It was also announced that Dustin Milligan ('Ethan Ward') would not be coming back for season two, while Matt Lanter would be joining the cast as a series regular. Casting soon began for new characters to be introduced in the second season. In June 2009, the series was reportedly looking for an actor to play the recurring role of Teddy, a tennis champ returning to West Beverly. Actor and model Trevor Donovan was later cast in the role. Ann Gillespie returned in the second season for multiple episodes as Jackie Taylor, Silver and Kelly's mother. Her character was once again sober and hoped to reconnect with her daughters after being diagnosed with cancer.

=== Filming ===
One of the show's locations was a complex on Waverly Drive in the Los Feliz neighborhood, designed by architect Bernard Maybeck in 1927 and best known as the convent of Immaculate Heart of Mary.

== Broadcast ==
90210 first aired in the United States on The CW, Tuesdays at 8:00 pm Eastern/7:00 pm Central.

In the United Kingdom, the series airs on Channel 4 and E4, after beating off competition from Channel 5, ITV2 and Living for the rights to broadcast the show. In November 2018, 90210 was made available on Channel 4's All 4. In Australia, it aired on Network Ten for 6 episodes until the network pulled it from their schedules due to low ratings. However, in January 2011 it started airing on Eleven as part of a broadcast schedule aimed at a younger audience. Due to poor performance, Eleven also pulled 90210 off their schedule. It is now shown on Sunday Afternoons at 5:00 p.m. The show airs in Ireland on RTÉ Two, initially the show aired in a prime-time slot of Thursdays paired with Ugly Betty. When the show returned for its second season the show was moved to an early morning timeslot of just after midnight where it still airs. In India, it airs on Big CBS Channels.

90210 went on its mid-season break on December 10, 2012, and was scheduled to return on January 21, 2013, at a new time slot of 9:00 pm, one week after the premiere of The Carrie Diaries, which took its original time slot of 8:00 pm.

DVR ratings for the series have sometimes doubled its broadcast ratings.

== Reception ==
=== Ratings ===
Seasonal rankings (based on average total viewers per episode) of 90210 on The CW.

Season	Timeslot (ET)	# Ep.	Premiered		Ended		TV Season	Rank	Viewers (in millions)	18–49 Rating (Average)
Season	Timeslot (ET)	# Ep.	Date	Premiere Viewers (in millions)	Date	Finale Viewers (in millions)	TV Season	Rank	Viewers (in millions)	18–49 Rating (Average)
1	Tuesday 8:00 pm (1–16); Tuesday 9:00 pm (17–24)	24	September 2, 2008	4.65	May 19, 2009	2.00	2008–2009	#172	2.70	1.4
2	Tuesday 8:00 pm	22	September 8, 2009	2.44	May 18, 2010	1.61	2009–2010	#137	1.87	0.9
3	Monday 8:00 pm	22	September 13, 2010	1.96	May 16, 2011	1.64	2010–2011	#133	1.76	0.9
4	Tuesday 8:00 pm	24	September 13, 2011	1.61	May 15, 2012	0.98	2011–2012	#145	1.34	0.7
5	Monday 8:00 pm (1–9); Monday 9:00 pm (10–22)	22	October 8, 2012	0.94	May 13, 2013	0.51	2012–2013	#147	0.77	0.4

The series premiere was seen by 4.65 million U.S. viewers. The UK premiere was seen by 468,000 viewers on E4.

The second season premiered to 2.56 million viewers and achieved 1.3 rating in the Adults 18-49 demographic, up 18% from its first-season finale but down 50% from its series premiere. Although ratings decreased after its three-month hiatus it was the #1 most successful show on DVR in the 18-49 percentage increase between March 22–28 increasing to a 1.1 rating. DVR ratings for the show have sometimes doubled its broadcast ratings. The CW have described its DVR ratings as some of the most impressive on TV and cited them as the reason for the series' fourth season renewal.

The third-season premiere was viewed by 1.96 million viewers in the United States and achieved a 0.9 rating in Adults 18–49. Episode 11 hit season highs in all categories with a 1.1 Adults 18-49 rating, 1.4 Adults 18-34 and 2.1 in The CW's target of Women 18–34. It was also the most watched episode in over a year with 2.18 million viewers tuning in. In the UK, the eighth episode of season three "Mother Dearest" was seen by 548,000 viewers, bettering its series premiere.

=== Critical response ===
Most reviews of the pilot were average. Metacritic gave the episode a score—a weighted average based on the impressions of a select 12 critical reviews—of 46, indicating "mixed or average reviews". Matthew Gilbert of The Boston Globe felt that like the original, 90210 was "pretty good". Gilbert said that the episode "seemed to take forever to set up some remarkably bland plotlines", which he found had been executed with more finesse by other teen soaps. The reviewer criticized the writers for "unimaginative material", and commented on the risqué oral sex scene. Gilbert claimed that the characters lacked depth and distinction throughout the pilot, especially Naomi, whom he compared negatively to Gossip Girl's Blair Waldorf. By contrast, Tom Gliatto of People magazine gave Naomi Clark a favorable review, but stated that he felt the cast as a whole had yet to gel. When compared to the original series, Rob Owen of the Pittsburgh Post-Gazette felt that the spin-off covered the same themes—family, friends, teen melodrama, relationships—but with more humor. Owen praised the compelling characters and the acting, and found the dialogue to be more painful than clever.

As the show continued its first season, the response became considerably more positive, and by the second season critical response was favorable. Entertainment Weekly gave the second season an A−, stating that "all it took was a little sunshine to give this show some heat", and that the "new, trashier take is working" after what they considered a "drippy" first season. LaDale Anderson of Canyon News commented on the change between the first two seasons, saying that "the transformation of the characters and storylines in season two has been fantastic", and "sometimes a show needs a makeover and with the right pieces in place a not so good show can become something sensational." The reviewer opined that "what has worked so well [...] is that the characters are not one-dimensional. With most shows characters seamlessly continue to embody characteristics that solely define them, but not here." Anderson also praised the writing, saying it was "intricate and intertwines itself without forcing the storylines to connect; they mesh naturally."

=== Awards and accolades ===
Awards and accolades for 90210
Year	Award	Category	Recipients	Result
2009	People's Choice Award	Favorite New TV Drama	90210	Nominated
2009	Prism Awards	Drama Series Multi-Episode Storyline	90210	Nominated
2009	Prism Awards	Performance in a Drama Multi-Episode Storyline	Jessica Lowndes	Nominated
2009	Teen Choice Awards	Choice TV Drama	90210	Nominated
2009	Teen Choice Awards	TV Breakout Show	90210	Nominated
2009	Teen Choice Awards	Choice TV Actor	Dustin Milligan	Nominated
2009	Teen Choice Awards	TV Breakout Female	AnnaLynne McCord	Nominated
2009	Teen Choice Awards	TV Breakout Star	Tristan Wilds	Nominated
2009	Teen Choice Awards	TV Parental Unit	Rob Estes and Lori Loughlin	Nominated
2009	ASCAP Award	Top Television Series	Liz Phair and Marc Dauer	Won
2010	Young Hollywood Awards	Young Hollywood Sparkling Performance	Jessica Stroup	Won
2010	Breakthrough of the Year Awards	Breakthrough Standout Performance	AnnaLynne McCord	Won
2010	TV Choice Awards	Best Drama Series	90210	Nominated
2010	Teen Choice Awards	Choice TV Drama	90210	Nominated
2010	Teen Choice Awards	Female Scene Stealer	Shenae Grimes	Nominated
2010	Teen Choice Awards	TV Parental Unit	Rob Estes and Lori Loughlin	Nominated
2010	Teen Choice Awards	Choice TV Actor	Tristan Wilds	Nominated

== Home media ==
All seasons are available on DVD. The streaming editions of the show, however, differ from the original airing and home media, with the original soundtracks replaced due to fees.

Name	Region 1	Region 2	Region 4	Discs	Extras
The First Season	August 11, 2009	August 17, 2009	April 7, 2011	6	Cast Commentaries on Selected Episodes; A Day in the Life of Ryan Eggold; Fitting In: The Fashion of 90210; The Music of 90210; Codes of Behavior; Set Tours: The Mansion, The Peach Pit, West Beverly High; The Revival of a Classic: Making 90210
The Second Season	August 24, 2010	September 6, 2010	July 21, 2011	6	Cast and Crew Commentaries on Selected Episodes; New Faces, Same Drama; From the Hills to the Beach: The Look of 90210; Beverly Hills Surf Crew; Welcome to the Beach Club; Set Tour: Beverly Hills Beach Club; Adrianna and Navid; Looking Back: 90210 Season 2 in Review
The Third Season	August 30, 2011	August 15, 2011	July 18, 2012	6	Cast and Crew Commentaries on Selected Episodes; Deleted Scenes; Behind the Scenes with Michael Steger and Matt Lanter; Kime Buzzelli, Artist; A 90210 Wedding; A Season in Review: Senior Year
The Fourth Season	October 2, 2012	October 1, 2012	March 6, 2013	6	Cast and Crew Commentaries on Selected Episodes; Set Tours; Dixon's Apartment, Naomi's Mansion, Offshore, The Student Union. Dressing Heads: Hair and Makeup of 90210, Creating Beats: The Music of 90210, Season In Review: Freshman Year. I Don't Want You Anymore Music Video, Gag Reel; Deleted Scenes.
The Final Season	October 8, 2013	October 14, 2013	March 5, 2014	5	Cast and Crew Commentary on 902-100, Set Tours; Silver's Apartment, Offshore 2.0. Casting 90210, Script to Screen: Creating an Episode, Season in Review: The Last Chapter. 90210 4ever: Retrospective, Deleted Scenes, Gag Reel.
