= List of 90210 episodes =

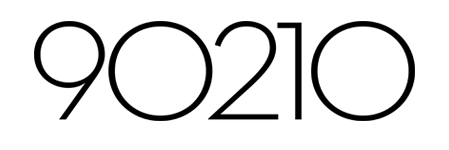

The following is an episode list of The CW series, 90210 — a spin-off to Beverly Hills, 90210, and the fourth series in the Beverly Hills, 90210 franchise. The show premiered September 2, 2008 in the U.S. on The CW and in Canada on Global. 90210 is available for purchase in the United States on iTunes in both HD and SD quality.

During the course of the series, 114 episodes of 90210 aired over five seasons, between September 2, 2008, and May 13, 2013.

== Series overview ==
| Season | Episodes | Originally released | |
| Season | Episodes | First released | Last released |
|---|---|---|---|
| 1 | 24 | September 2, 2008 | May 19, 2009 |
| 2 | 22 | September 8, 2009 | May 18, 2010 |
| 3 | 22 | September 13, 2010 | May 16, 2011 |
| 4 | 24 | September 13, 2011 | May 15, 2012 |
| 5 | 22 | October 8, 2012 | May 13, 2013 |

== Episodes ==
=== Season 1 (2008–09) ===
| No. overall | No. in season | Title | Directed by | Written by | Original release date | U.S. viewers (millions) |
|---|---|---|---|---|---|---|
| 1 | 1 | "We're Not in Kansas Anymore" | Mark Piznarski | Rob Thomas & Gabe Sachs & Jeff Judah | September 2, 2008 | 4.65 |
| 2 | 2 | "The Jet Set" | Wendey Stanzler | Gabe Sachs & Jeff Judah & Darlene Hunt | September 2, 2008 | 4.65 |
| 3 | 3 | "Lucky Strike" | Mark Piznarski | Jill Gordon | September 9, 2008 | 3.23 |
| 4 | 4 | "The Bubble" | Sarah Pia Anderson | Dailyn Rodriguez | September 16, 2008 | 3.28 |
| 5 | 5 | "Wide Awake and Dreaming" | Paul Lazarus | Sean Reycraft | September 23, 2008 | 2.94 |
| 6 | 6 | "Model Behavior" | J. Miller Tobin | Jason Ning | September 30, 2008 | 3.24 |
| 7 | 7 | "Hollywood Forever" | Norman Buckley | Caprice Crane | October 7, 2008 | 3.11 |
| 8 | 8 | "There's No Place Like Homecoming" | Tony Wharmby | Darlene Hunt | October 28, 2008 | 3.15 |
| 9 | 9 | "Secrets and Lies" | Nick Marck | Dailyn Rodriguez | November 4, 2008 | 2.94 |
| 10 | 10 | "Games People Play" | Wendey Stanzler | Kristin Long | November 11, 2008 | 2.71 |
| 11 | 11 | "That Which We Destroy" | Melanie Mayron | Allison Schroeder & Caprice Crane | November 18, 2008 | 2.92 |
| 12 | 12 | "Hello, Goodbye, Amen" | Stuart Gillard | Jennifer Cecil | January 6, 2009 | 2.80 |
| 13 | 13 | "Love Me or Leave Me" | Wendey Stanzler | Paul Sciarrotta | January 13, 2009 | 2.18 |
| 14 | 14 | "By Accident" | Michael Grossman | Michael Sonnenschein | January 20, 2009 | 2.30 |
| 15 | 15 | "Help Me, Rhonda" | Liz Friedlander | Jason Ning | February 3, 2009 | 2.49 |
| 16 | 16 | "Of Heartbreaks and Hotels" | J. Miller Tobin | Sean Reycraft | February 10, 2009 | 2.38 |
| 17 | 17 | "Life's a Drag" | Wendey Stanzler | Caprice Crane | March 31, 2009 | 2.03 |
| 18 | 18 | "Off the Rails" | Jason Priestley | Steve Hanna | April 7, 2009 | 1.95 |
| 19 | 19 | "Okaeri, Donna!" | Stuart Gillard | Jennie Snyder Urman & Rebecca Rand Kirshner Sinclair | April 14, 2009 | 2.13 |
| 20 | 20 | "Between a Sign and a Hard Place" | Rob Estes | Jennie Snyder Urman & Rebecca Rand Kirshner Sinclair | April 21, 2009 | 1.87 |
| 21 | 21 | "The Dionysian Debacle" | Jamie Babbit | Jennie Snyder Urman | April 28, 2009 | 1.79 |
| 22 | 22 | "The Party's Over" | Melanie Mayron | Jennifer Cecil | May 5, 2009 | 1.84 |
| 23 | 23 | "Zero Tolerance" | Nick Marck | Gayle Abrams & Jennie Snyder Urman | May 12, 2009 | 2.07 |
| 24 | 24 | "One Party Can Ruin Your Whole Summer" | Wendey Stanzler | Rebecca Rand Kirshner Sinclair | May 19, 2009 | 2.00 |

=== Season 2 (2009–10) ===
| No. overall | No. in season | Title | Directed by | Written by | Original release date | U.S. viewers (millions) |
|---|---|---|---|---|---|---|
| 25 | 1 | "To New Beginnings!" | Stuart Gillard | Rebecca Sinclair | September 8, 2009 | 2.56 |
| 26 | 2 | "To Sext or Not to Sext" | Tony Wharmby | Jennie Snyder Urman | September 15, 2009 | 2.31 |
| 27 | 3 | "Sit Down, You're Rocking the Boat" | Janice Cooke | Mark Driscoll | September 22, 2009 | 2.00 |
| 28 | 4 | "The Porn King" | James L. Conway | Maria Maggenti & Jordan Budde | September 29, 2009 | 2.21 |
| 29 | 5 | "Environmental Hazards" | Jamie Babbit | Padma L. Atluri & Jennie Snyder Urman | October 6, 2009 | 2.09 |
| 30 | 6 | "Wild Alaskan Salmon" | Liz Friedlander | Mark Driscoll | October 13, 2009 | 2.25 |
| 31 | 7 | "Unmasked" | J. Miller Tobin | Jennie Snyder Urman | October 20, 2009 | 2.25 |
| 32 | 8 | "Women's Intuition" | Stuart Gillard | Rebecca Sinclair | November 3, 2009 | 1.92 |
| 33 | 9 | "A Trip to the Moon" | Rick Rosenthal | Paul Sciarotta & Jennie Snyder Urman | November 10, 2009 | 2.06 |
| 34 | 10 | "To Thine Own Self Be True" | Mike Listo | Ben Dougan | November 17, 2009 | 2.10 |
| 35 | 11 | "And Away They Go!" | Harry Sinclair | Rebecca Sinclair & Natalie Krinsky | December 1, 2009 | 2.15 |
| 36 | 12 | "Winter Wonderland" | David Warren | Jennie Snyder Urman | December 8, 2009 | 1.91 |
| 37 | 13 | "Rats and Heroes" | Stuart Gillard | Mark Driscoll & Padma L. Atluri | March 9, 2010 | 1.70 |
| 38 | 14 | "Girl Fight!" | Fred Gerber | Rebecca Sinclair & Jennie Snyder Urman | March 16, 2010 | 1.84 |
| 39 | 15 | "What's Past Is Prologue" | Norman Buckley | Daniel Arkin | March 23, 2010 | 1.51 |
| 40 | 16 | "Clark Raving Mad" | Stuart Gillard | Tod Himmel | March 30, 2010 | 1.48 |
| 41 | 17 | "Sweaty Palms and Weak Knees" | Krishna Rao | Ben Dougan | April 6, 2010 | 1.33 |
| 42 | 18 | "Another, Another Chance" | Millicent Shelton | Scott Weinger | April 13, 2010 | 1.45 |
| 43 | 19 | "Multiple Choices" | Liz Friedlander | Paul Sciarrotta | April 27, 2010 | 1.54 |
| 44 | 20 | "Meet the Parent" | Stuart Gillard | Jessica Chaffin | May 4, 2010 | 1.43 |
| 45 | 21 | "Javianna" | James L. Conway | Jennie Snyder Urman | May 11, 2010 | 1.45 |
| 46 | 22 | "Confessions" | Rebecca Sinclair | Rebecca Sinclair | May 18, 2010 | 1.61 |

=== Season 3 (2010–11) ===
| No. overall | No. in season | Title | Directed by | Written by | Original release date | U.S. viewers (millions) |
|---|---|---|---|---|---|---|
| 47 | 1 | "Senior Year, Baby" | Stuart Gillard | Jennie Snyder Urman | September 13, 2010 | 1.96 |
| 48 | 2 | "Age of Inheritance" | Liz Friedlander | Padma L. Atluri | September 20, 2010 | 1.83 |
| 49 | 3 | "2021 Vision" | Millicent Shelton | Tod Himmel | September 27, 2010 | 1.96 |
| 50 | 4 | "The Bachelors" | David Warren | David S. Rosenthal | October 4, 2010 | 1.79 |
| 51 | 5 | "Catch Me If You Cannon" | Jim Conway | Terrence Coli | October 11, 2010 | 1.81 |
| 52 | 6 | "How Much Is That Liam in the Window" | Stuart Gillard | David S. Rosenthal & Jennie Snyder Urman | October 25, 2010 | 2.03 |
| 53 | 7 | "I See London, I See France..." | Krishna Rao | Scott Weinger | November 1, 2010 | 2.00 |
| 54 | 8 | "Mother Dearest" | Oz Scott | Paul Sciarrotta | November 8, 2010 | 1.89 |
| 55 | 9 | "They're Playing Her Song" | Rob Hardy | Jennie Snyder Urman & Jenna Lamia | November 15, 2010 | 1.76 |
| 56 | 10 | "Best Lei'd Plans" | David Warren | David S. Rosenthal & Deborah Schoeneman | November 29, 2010 | 2.01 |
| 57 | 11 | "Holiday Madness" | Dennis Smith | Rebecca Sinclair | December 6, 2010 | 2.18 |
| 58 | 12 | "Liars" | Stuart Gillard | Tod Himmel | January 24, 2011 | 1.69 |
| 59 | 13 | "It's Getting Hot in Here" | Liz Friedlander | David S. Rosenthal | January 31, 2011 | 1.67 |
| 60 | 14 | "All About a Boy" | Harry Sinclair | Paul Sciarrotta | February 7, 2011 | 1.75 |
| 61 | 15 | "Revenge with the Nerd" | Millicent Shelton | Terrence Coli | February 14, 2011 | 1.37 |
| 62 | 16 | "It's High Time" | Krishna Rao | Padma Alturi | February 21, 2011 | 1.52 |
| 63 | 17 | "Blue Naomi" | Elizabeth Allen | David S. Rosenthal | February 28, 2011 | 1.45 |
| 64 | 18 | "The Enchanted Donkey" | David Paymer | Story by : Rebecca Sinclair; Teleplay by : Rebecca Sinclair & Paul Sciarrotta | April 18, 2011 | 1.72 |
| 65 | 19 | "Nerdy Little Secrets" | Harry Sinclair | David Rosenberg | April 25, 2011 | 1.74 |
| 66 | 20 | "Women on the Verge" | Stuart Gillard | Scott Weinger & Jenna Lamia | May 2, 2011 | 1.47 |
| 67 | 21 | "The Prom Before the Storm" | Mike Listo | David Rosenthal & Terrence Coli | May 9, 2011 | 1.43 |
| 68 | 22 | "To the Future!" | Rebecca Sinclair | Rebecca Sinclair & Paul Sciarotta | May 16, 2011 | 1.64 |

=== Season 4 (2011–12) ===
| No. overall | No. in season | Title | Directed by | Written by | Original release date | U.S. viewers (millions) |
|---|---|---|---|---|---|---|
| 69 | 1 | "Up In Smoke" | Elizabeth Allen | Patti Carr & Lara Olsen | September 13, 2011 | 1.61 |
| 70 | 2 | "Rush Hour" | Elizabeth Allen | Terrence Coli | September 20, 2011 | 1.47 |
| 71 | 3 | "Greek Tragedy" | Rob Hardy | Paul Sciarrotta | September 27, 2011 | 1.58 |
| 72 | 4 | "Let the Games Begin" | Millicent Shelton | Jenna Lamia | October 4, 2011 | 1.29 |
| 73 | 5 | "Party Politics" | Cherie Nowlan | Marjorie David | October 11, 2011 | 1.54 |
| 74 | 6 | "Benefit of the Doubt" | James L. Conway | Liz Phang | October 18, 2011 | 1.41 |
| 75 | 7 | "It's the Great Masquerade, Naomi Clark" | David Warren | Brian Dawson | November 1, 2011 | 1.48 |
| 76 | 8 | "Vegas, Maybe?" | Stuart Gillard | Scott Weinger | November 8, 2011 | 1.55 |
| 77 | 9 | "A Thousand Words" | Millicent Shelton | Chris Atwood | November 15, 2011 | 1.59 |
| 78 | 10 | "Smoked Turkey" | Jerry Levine | Miriam Trogdon | November 22, 2011 | 1.26 |
| 79 | 11 | "Project Runaway" | Harry Sinclair | Allen Clary | November 29, 2011 | 1.52 |
| 80 | 12 | "O Holly Night" | Stuart Gillard | Paul Sciarrotta | December 6, 2011 | 1.46 |
| 81 | 13 | "Should Old Acquaintance Be Forgot?" | Cherie Nowlan | Jenna Lamia | January 17, 2012 | 1.25 |
| 82 | 14 | "Mama Can You Hear Me?" | Stuart Gillard | Scott Weinger | January 24, 2012 | 1.24 |
| 83 | 15 | "Trust, Truth and Traffic" | Bethany Rooney | Marjorie David | January 31, 2012 | 1.38 |
| 84 | 16 | "No Good Deed" | Stuart Gillard | Chris Atwood | February 7, 2012 | 1.34 |
| 85 | 17 | "Babes in Toyland" | Michael Zinberg | Liz Phang | March 6, 2012 | 1.26 |
| 86 | 18 | "Blood Is Thicker Than Mud" | Stuart Gillard | Paul Sciarrotta | March 13, 2012 | 1.16 |
| 87 | 19 | "The Heart Will Go On" | Matthew Diamond | Patti Carr | March 20, 2012 | 1.25 |
| 88 | 20 | "Blue Ivy" | Stuart Gillard | Terrence Coli | March 27, 2012 | 1.27 |
| 89 | 21 | "Bride and Prejudice" | Sanaa Hamri | William H. Brown | April 24, 2012 | 1.11 |
| 90 | 22 | "'Tis Pity" | Harry Sinclair | Scott Weinger | May 1, 2012 | 1.13 |
| 91 | 23 | "A Tale of Two Parties" | Rob Hardy | Terrence Coli & Jenna Lamia | May 8, 2012 | 1.15 |
| 92 | 24 | "Forever Hold Your Peace" | Harry Sinclair | Lara Olsen | May 15, 2012 | 1.04 |

=== Season 5 (2012–13) ===
| No. overall | No. in season | Title | Directed by | Written by | Original release date | U.S. viewers (millions) |
|---|---|---|---|---|---|---|
| 93 | 1 | "Til Death Do Us Part" | Stuart Gillard | Patti Carr | October 8, 2012 | 0.94 |
| 94 | 2 | "The Sea Change" | Bethany Rooney | Lara Olsen | October 15, 2012 | 1.06 |
| 95 | 3 | "It's All Fun and Games" | Cherie Nowlan | Brian Dawson | October 22, 2012 | 0.91 |
| 96 | 4 | "Into the Wild" | Hanelle Culpepper | Chris Atwood | November 5, 2012 | 0.85 |
| 97 | 5 | "Hate 2 Love" | Sanaa Hamri | Mike Chessler & Chris Alberghini | November 12, 2012 | 1.16 |
| 98 | 6 | "The Con" | Harry Sinclair | Terrence Coli | November 19, 2012 | 0.78 |
| 99 | 7 | "99 Problems" | Michael Zinberg | William H. Brown | November 26, 2012 | 0.97 |
| 100 | 8 | "902–100" | Harry Sinclair | Scott Weinger | December 3, 2012 | 1.00 |
| 101 | 9 | "The Things We Do for Love" | Matthew Diamond | Marjorie David | December 10, 2012 | 1.11 |
| 102 | 10 | "Misery Loves Company" | Anton Cropper | Allen Clary | January 21, 2013 | 0.79 |
| 103 | 11 | "We're Not Not in Kansas Anymore" | Cherie Nowlan | Liz Phang | January 28, 2013 | 0.78 |
| 104 | 12 | "Here Comes Honey Bye Bye" | Stuart Gillard | Liz Sczudlo | February 4, 2013 | 0.79 |
| 105 | 13 | "#realness" | Mike Listo | Chris Alberghini & Mike Chessler | February 11, 2013 | 0.66 |
| 106 | 14 | "Brother from Another Mother" | Benny Boom | Chris Atwood | February 18, 2013 | 0.55 |
| 107 | 15 | "Strange Brew" | Bethany Rooney | Brian Dawson | February 25, 2013 | 0.58 |
| 108 | 16 | "Life's a Beach" | Michael Zinberg | Bill Brown | March 4, 2013 | 0.64 |
| 109 | 17 | "Dude, Where's My Husband?" | Matthew Diamond | Liz Phang | March 11, 2013 | 0.67 |
| 110 | 18 | "A Portrait of the Artist As a Young Call Girl" | Bethany Rooney | Scott Weinger | April 15, 2013 | 0.55 |
| 111 | 19 | "The Empire State Strikes Back" | Stuart Gillard | Scott Weinger | April 22, 2013 | 0.49 |
| 112 | 20 | "You Can't Win Em All" | Michael Zinberg | Patti Carr | April 29, 2013 | 0.55 |
| 113 | 21 | "Scandal Royale" | David Warren | Terrence Coli & Paul Sciarrotta | May 6, 2013 | 0.60 |
| 114 | 22 | "We All Fall Down" | Harry Sinclair | Lara Olsen | May 13, 2013 | 0.51 |

== Ratings ==
90210. : U.S. viewers per episode (millions)

| Season | Episode number | | | | | | | | | | | | | | | | | | | | | | | |
| Season | 1 | 2 | 3 | 4 | 5 | 6 | 7 | 8 | 9 | 10 | 11 | 12 | 13 | 14 | 15 | 16 | 17 | 18 | 19 | 20 | 21 | 22 | 23 | 24 |
|---|---|---|---|---|---|---|---|---|---|---|---|---|---|---|---|---|---|---|---|---|---|---|---|---|
| 1 | 4.65 | 4.65 | 3.23 | 3.28 | 2.94 | 3.24 | 3.11 | 3.15 | 2.94 | 2.71 | 2.92 | 2.80 | 2.18 | 2.30 | 2.49 | 2.38 | 2.03 | 1.95 | 2.13 | 1.87 | 1.79 | 1.84 | 2.07 | 2.00 |
| 2 | 2.56 | 2.31 | 2.00 | 2.21 | 2.09 | 2.25 | 2.25 | 1.92 | 2.06 | 2.10 | 2.15 | 1.91 | 1.70 | 1.84 | 1.51 | 1.48 | 1.33 | 1.45 | 1.54 | 1.43 | 1.45 | 1.61 | – | |
| 3 | 1.96 | 1.83 | 1.96 | 1.79 | 1.81 | 2.03 | 2.00 | 1.89 | 1.76 | 2.01 | 2.18 | 1.69 | 1.67 | 1.75 | 1.37 | 1.52 | 1.45 | 1.72 | 1.74 | 1.47 | 1.43 | 1.64 | – | |
| 4 | 1.61 | 1.47 | 1.58 | 1.29 | 1.54 | 1.41 | 1.48 | 1.55 | 1.59 | 1.26 | 1.52 | 1.46 | 1.25 | 1.24 | 1.38 | 1.34 | 1.26 | 1.16 | 1.25 | 1.27 | 1.11 | 1.13 | 1.15 | 1.04 |
| 5 | 0.94 | 1.06 | 0.91 | 0.85 | 1.16 | 0.78 | 0.97 | 1.00 | 1.11 | 0.79 | 0.78 | 0.79 | 0.66 | 0.55 | 0.58 | 0.64 | 0.67 | 0.55 | 0.49 | 0.55 | 0.60 | 0.51 | – | |

Audience measurement performed by Nielsen Media Research

=== Specials ===
A retrospective of the entire series titled "90210 4ever" aired on May 13, 2013, before the series finale.

| Special no. | Title | Directed by | Original air date | Production code | U.S. viewers (in millions) |
|---|---|---|---|---|---|
| 1 | "90210 4Ever: Retrospective" | N/A | May 13, 2013 | S05 | 0.57 |
