= Ryan Eggold =

American actor (born 1984)

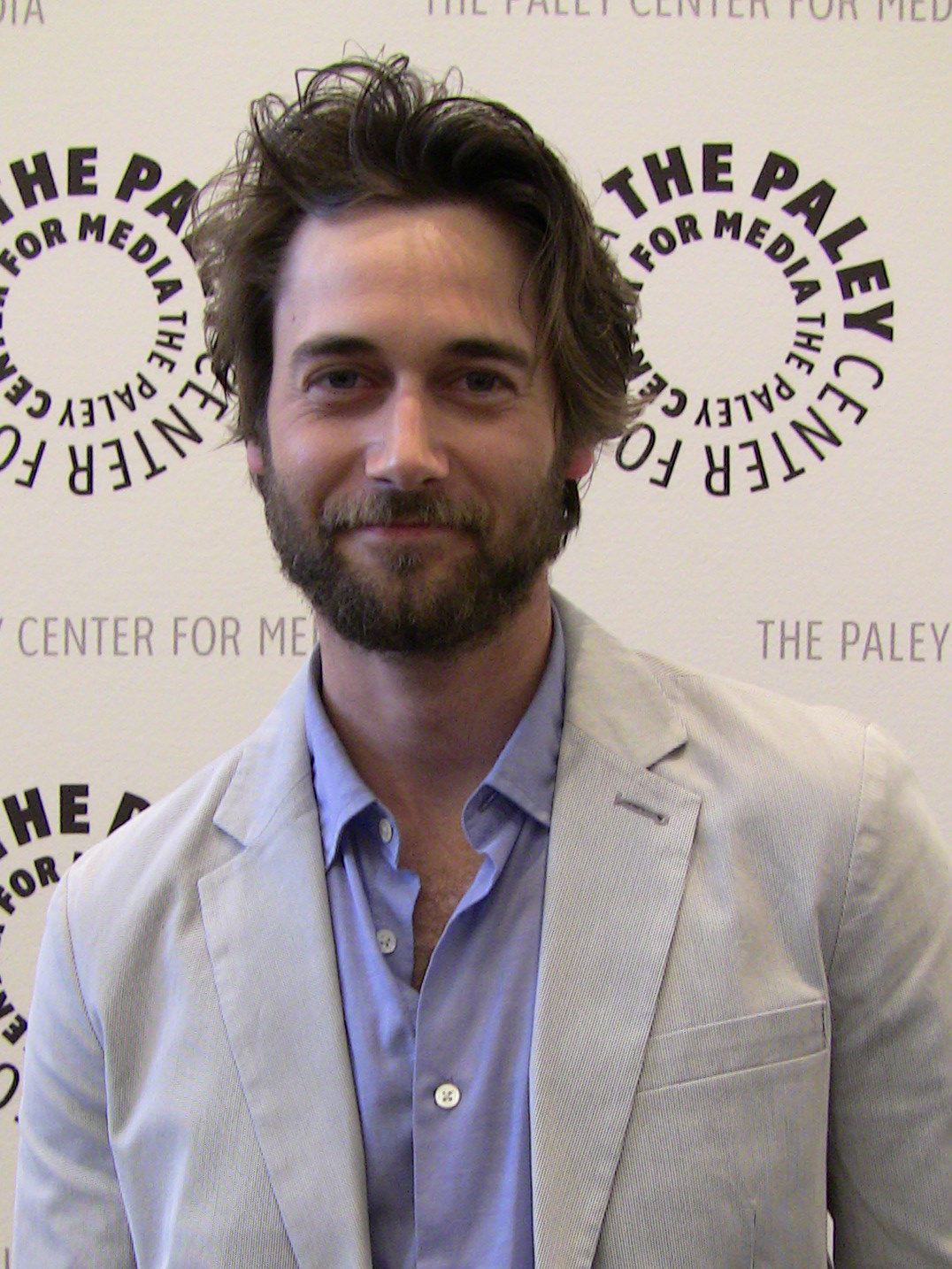
- Eggold in 2009
- Born: August 10, 1984 (age 42); Lakewood, California, U.S.
- Education: University of Southern California
- Occupation: Actor
- Years active: 2006–present

Ryan James Eggold is an American actor known for roles such as Ryan Matthews on 90210 (2008–11), Tom Keen on The Blacklist (2013–17) and its spin-off, The Blacklist: Redemption (2017), and Dr. Max Goodwin on New Amsterdam (2018–23).

== Early life and education ==
Eggold was born August 10, 1984 in Lakewood, California. Eggold graduated from Santa Margarita Catholic High School in 2002, where he participated in many school theater performances, and later from the University of Southern California's theater arts department in 2006.

== Career ==
In 2006, Eggold made his professional television debut by way of a guest appearance on the show Related. He made his film debut the same year in the short film Con: The Corruption of Helm.

Eggold had recurring roles on CBS's The Young and the Restless, HBO's Entourage, Cartoon Network's Out of Jimmy's Head, ABC's Brothers & Sisters, and the UPN/CW series Veronica Mars, before obtaining his first series regular role on the FX's Dirt.

Eggold made his professional stage debut in the 2006 Ahmanson Theatre/Center Theatre Group production Dead End, directed by Nick Martin, and has since appeared in productions of Leipzig, the LA Weekly Theater Award–winning production of Marat/Sade, and an original production titled Amy and Elliot which he wrote, directed, and starred in at the Stella Adler Theatre with Alexandra Breckenridge.

Eggold portrayed English teacher Ryan Matthews in 90210, the CW spin-off of FOX's Beverly Hills, 90210. In January 2012, he played Mischa Barton's love interest in Mark Edwin Robinson's supernatural romance thriller Into the Dark. From 2013 to 2017, he regularly appeared as Tom Keen, a main character on the NBC drama The Blacklist. In January 2015, Eggold appeared on the History Channel's three-night miniseries Sons of Liberty as Dr. Joseph Warren, a friend of Sam Adams and Paul Revere.

In 2017, Eggold made a guest appearance on the second episode of Top Gear America.

From 2018 to 2023, Eggold played Dr. Max Goodwin in the NBC series New Amsterdam. Most recently, he had started Analog A Productions, with a first-look deal at Universal Television, with Kara Frias named head of development for his new production company.

== Personal life ==
Eggold was previously in a relationship with Twilight actress Ashley Greene.

Eggold writes music, plays guitar and piano, and sings in the band Eleanor Avenue.

== Filmography ==
=== Film ===
Key
| † | Denotes films that have not yet been released |

| Year | Title | Role | Notes |
|---|---|---|---|
| 2010 | First Dates | Tom | Direct to DVD |
| 2011 | Driving by Braille | Xander West | |
| 2011 | Trophy Kids | Max | |
| 2011 | Sironia | Mason Jones | |
| 2012 | Into the Dark | Adam Hunt | |
| 2013 | B-Side | Mike Zumsteg | |
| 2013 | Lucky Them | Lucas Stone | |
| 2013 | Beside Still Waters | Daniel | |
| 2014 | The Single Moms Club | Peter | |
| 2014 | The Disappearance of Eleanor Rigby | Guy from club | |
| 2014 | Fathers and Daughters | John | |
| 2015 | Battle Scars | Nicky Stephens | |
| 2016 | Lovesong | Leif | |
| 2017 | Literally, Right Before Aaron | —N/a | Writer, director and producer |
| 2018 | BlacKkKlansman | Walter Breachway | |
| 2020 | Never Rarely Sometimes Always | Ted | |
| 2022 | A Jazzman's Blues | Ira | |
| 2024 | Junction | Jacob | |
| 2025 | My Secret Santa | Matthew Layne | |
| 2026 | Evil Genius | TBA | |

=== Television ===
Key
| † | Denotes television productions that have not yet been released |

| Year | Title | Role | Notes |
|---|---|---|---|
| 2006 | Related | Lloyd | Episode: "The Cape" |
| 2006 | Brothers & Sisters | Randy Stewart | Episode: "Family Portrait" |
| 2006 | Veronica Mars | Charlie Stone | Episode: "Charlie Don't Surf" |
| 2006 | The War at Home | Bruce | Episode: "Gaza Strip" |
| 2007 | The Young and the Restless | Barista | 3 episodes |
| 2007 | Nick Cannon Presents: Short Circuitz | Jerry | Episode: "Suge Knight Light" |
| 2007 | Out of Jimmy's Head | Mike the Werewolf | Recurring role |
| 2007 | Entourage | Five Towns cast member | 2 episodes |
| 2008 | Dirt | Farber Kauffman | Recurring role |
| 2008 | Entourage | Himself | Episode: "Fantasy Island" |
| 2008–2011 | 90210 | Ryan Matthews | Main role |
| 2009 | United States of Tara | Tevin | Episode: "Possibility" |
| 2013–2018 | The Blacklist | Tom Keen / Jacob Phelps / Christopher Hargrave / Christof Mannheim | Main role |
| 2015 | Sons of Liberty | Joseph Warren | 3 episodes |
| 2017 | The Blacklist: Redemption | Tom Keen / Jacob Phelps / Christopher Hargrave | Main role |
| 2018–2023 | New Amsterdam | Dr. Max Goodwin | Main role; also producer and directed 3 episodes |
| 2024 | Cross | Ed Ramsey | Main role |
| 2024–2025 | Krapopolis | Apollo (voice) | Recurring role |
| 2024–2026 | Law & Order | Matt Riley | 3 episodes |
| TBA | Seven Sisters † | TBA | Main role |

=== Stage ===
| Year | Title | Role | Venue | Notes |
|---|---|---|---|---|
| 2005 | Dead End | | Ahmanson Theater | |
| 2011 | Amy and Elliot | Elliot | Stella Adler Theatre | |
| 2019 | Leipzig | Erich | Marilyn Monroe Theatre | |
| 2024 | Yellow Face | Marcus | Todd Haimes Theatre | |

=== Web series ===
| Year | Title | Role | Notes |
|---|---|---|---|
| 2012 | Daybreak | Ben Wilkins | 5 episodes |
