= Mark Edwin Robinson =

American film director and screenwriter (born 1980)

- Born: November 6, 1980 (age 45); San Diego, California, U.S.
- Occupations: Film Director, Screenwriter
- Years active: 2004–present

Mark Edwin Robinson (born November 6, 1980) is an American film director and screenwriter.

== Career ==
He made his directorial debut at the age of 22 with the horror film, Breaking Dawn (Lionsgate 2004) which was showcased at the Cannes Film Festival Marché du Film and at The Hollywood Film Festival. Robinson's follow up project is the mystery-horror, The Levenger Tapes which was released by Lionsgate Films in 2011. In January 2012 he began filming his latest project, the supernatural romance horror, Into the Dark, with Mischa Barton and Ryan Eggold in the lead roles.

In 2001, with his father, David C. Robinson, he co-founded Castlight Pictures, Inc, a film, television and commercial production company based in Los Angeles and Temecula. He graduated from Linfield Christian School and began writing scripts when he was 16.

Mark wrote the upcoming biographical film Hal, directed by Mark Williams.

== Filmography ==
- Breaking Dawn (Lionsgate 2004)
- The Levenger Tapes (Lionsgate 2011)
- Into the Dark (Epic Pictures 2013)
- Hal
