= Arthur Yoria =

American musician

Arthur Yoria is an American musician based in Houston, Texas, United States.

Born in Chicago on September 5, 1969, as Alvaro Arturo Guzman, Yoria started to play guitar very late while he was attending the University of Houston. After stints in the Houston-based bands, The Jeepneys and Lavendula, Arthur decided to set out on his own and released a 4-song, self-titled EP in 2001 followed by a 5-song EP, Can You Still Look Adorable in 2002. He has since released other EPs in both English and Spanish.

Yoria was nominated for several prizes in the Houston Press Music Awards. He founded 12 Records, Inc. together with his good friend and former Houston Rocket, Matt Maloney, and recorded I'll Be Here Awake which reached #8 on the specialty radio charts. One of Yoria's songs from that album, Here to Stay, was used in the Fox Television show The O.C. and in the final credits of the 2004 psychological thriller film Breaking Dawn. Yoria's work is featured on a regular basis in TV commercials for CheapBooks.com, since 2006.

Yoria has toured extensively in the U.S. as well as internationally, including Medellin Colombia at C.C. Monterrey in May 2011. Live he combines guitar and vocals with samples, loops, and digital effects. The tracks that are heard live are recorded immediately on stage and are then played under the current live track until that track too becomes a background layer.

== Reviews and awards ==
- Featured Artist on Radio Free- Arizona Jeans
- Musician of the Month- Designateria
- Nominated for Songwriter of the Year and Best Rock en Espanol- Houston Press Awards
- Finalist in Virgin Records Mega College Tour Competition- Virgin Records
- Another review
