= History of Federal Open Market Committee actions =

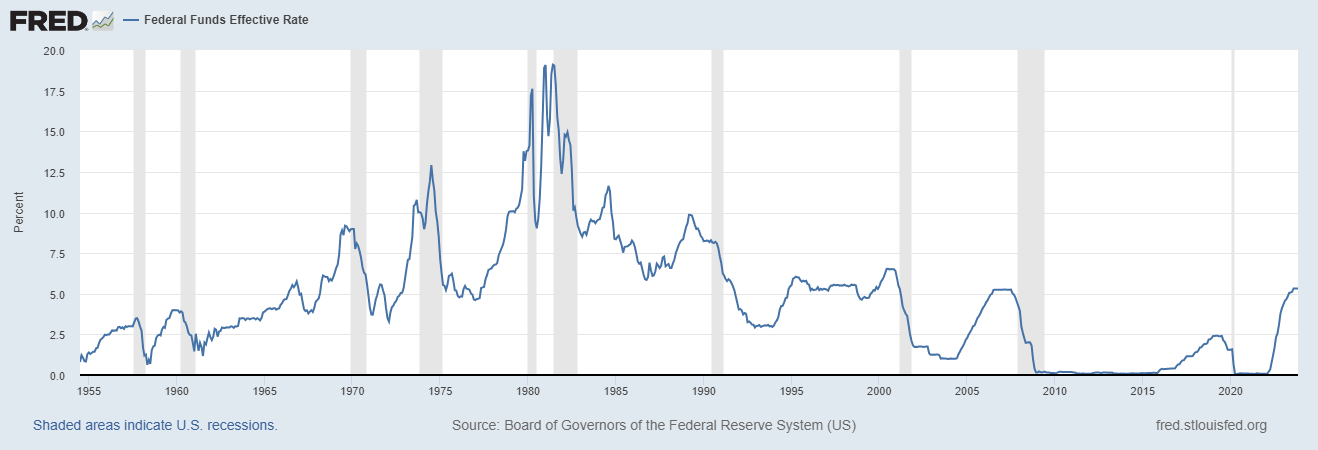
The effective federal funds rate over time, through December 2023

This is a list of historical rate actions by the United States Federal Open Market Committee (FOMC). The FOMC controls the supply of credit to banks and the sale of treasury securities.

The Federal Open Market Committee meets every two months during the fiscal year. At scheduled meetings, the FOMC meets and makes any changes it sees as necessary, notably to the federal funds rate and the discount rate. The committee may also take actions with a less firm target, such as an increasing liquidity by the sale of a set amount of Treasury bonds, or affecting the price of currencies both foreign and domestic by selling dollar reserves (such as during the Mexican peso bailout in 1994).

Kevin Warsh is the current chairperson of the Federal Reserve and the FOMC.

== Famous actions ==
=== Operation Twist (1961) ===
The Federal Open Market Committee action known as Operation Twist (named for the twist dance craze of the time) began in 1961. The intent was to flatten the yield curve in order to promote capital inflows and strengthen the dollar. The Fed utilized open market operations to shorten the maturity of public debt in the open market. It performs the 'twist' by selling some of the short term debt (with three years or less to maturity) it purchased as part of the quantitative easing policy back into the market and using the money received from this to buy longer term government debt. Although this action was marginally successful in reducing the spread between long-term maturities and short-term maturities, Vincent Reinhart and others have suggested it did not continue for a sufficient period of time to be effective. Despite being considered a failure since a 1966 near-term analysis by Franco Modigliani and Richard Sutch, the action has subsequently been reexamined and in a 2011 paper economist Eric Swanson of the Federal Reserve Bank of San Francisco has suggested that "Operation Twist" was more effective than originally thought. Swanson suggested similar action as an alternative to quantitative easing by central banks; the FOMC did in fact take an analogous action in 2011.

=== Saturday Night Massacre (1979) ===
Inflation in the US was persistent in the 1970s. Year-on-year inflation bottomed at 5% in December 1976 before moving higher once again. Paul Volcker was chosen as Fed Chairman in 1979 in order to deal with the challenge of high inflation. In a rare Saturday press conference on October 6, 1979, Paul Volcker's federal reserve increased the Fed Funds rate from 11% to 12%. The event was known as the "Saturday Night Massacre" because of its effect on US bond prices.

=== Quantitative Easing 1 (QE1, December 2008 to March 2010) ===
"On November 25, 2008, the Federal Reserve announced that it would purchase up to $600 billion in agency Mortgage-Backed Securities (MBSs) and agency debt. However, these purchases were to have no impact on the balance sheet, and would have been sterilized by Treasury sales by the System Open Market Account (SOMA) desk. On December 1, Chairman Bernanke provided further details in a speech. On December 16 the program was formally approved by the FOMC, however their approval was not required as the SOMA desk was already authorized to acquire Agency debt and MBS as part of their Open Market Operations (OMOs). On March 18, 2009, the FOMC announced that the program would be expanded by an additional $750 billion in purchases of agency MBS and agency debt and $300 billion in purchases of Treasury securities. These purchases would be unsterilized and this date more appropriately marks the beginning of QE in the US.

=== Zero Interest Rate Policy (ZIRP) (December 2008 to December 2015) ===
In August 2007, the Federal Open Market Committee's (FOMC) target for the federal funds rate was 5.25 percent. Sixteen months later, with the 2008 financial crisis in full swing, the FOMC had lowered the target for the federal funds rate to nearly zero, thereby entering the unfamiliar territory of having to conduct monetary policy with the policy interest rate at its effective lower bound. The unusual severity of the recession and ongoing strains in financial markets made the challenges facing monetary policymakers all the greater.

At the height of the 2008 financial crisis, the Federal Open Market Committee decided to lower overnight interest rates to zero to help with easing of money and credit. Over the past five years, the Federal Reserve has acted to support economic growth and foster job creation, and it is important to achieve further progress, particularly in the labor market. Taking due account of the uncertainties and limits of its policy tools, the Federal Reserve will provide additional policy accommodation as needed to promote a stronger economic recovery and sustained improvement in labor market conditions in a context of price stability.

=== Quantitative Easing 2 (QE2, November 2010 to June 2011) ===
On November 3, 2010, the Fed announced that it would purchase $600 billion of longer dated treasuries, at a rate of $75 billion per month. That program, popularly known as "QE2", concluded in June 2011.

=== Operation Twist (2011) ===
The Federal Open Market Committee concluded its September 21, 2011 Meeting at about 2:15 p.m. EDT by announcing the implementation of Operation Twist. This is a plan to purchase $400 billion of bonds with maturities of 6 to 30 years and to sell bonds with maturities less than 3 years, thereby extending the average maturity of the Fed's own portfolio. This is an attempt to do what Quantitative Easing (QE) tries to do, without printing more money and without expanding the Fed's balance sheet, therefore hopefully avoiding the inflationary pressure associated with QE. This announcement brought a bout of risk aversion in the equity markets and strengthened the US Dollar, whereas QE I had weakened the USD and supported the equity markets. Further, on June 20, 2012, the Federal Open Market Committee announced an extension to the Twist programme by adding additionally $267 billion thereby extending it throughout 2012.

=== Quantitative Easing 3 (QE3, September 2012 to December 2013) ===
On September 13, 2012, the Federal Reserve announced a third round of quantitative easing (QE3). This new round of quantitative easing provided for an open-ended commitment to purchase $40 billion agency mortgage-backed securities per month until the labor market improves "substantially". Some economists believe that Scott Sumner's blog on nominal income targeting played a role in popularizing the "wonky, once-eccentric policy" of "unlimited QE".

The Federal Open Market Committee voted to expand its quantitative easing program further on December 12, 2012. This round continued to authorize up to $40 billion worth of agency mortgage-backed securities per month and added $45 billion worth of longer-term Treasury securities. The outright Treasury purchases as part of the augmented program continued at a pace comparable to that under "Operation Twist"; however, the Federal Reserve could no longer sell short-dated Treasury securities to buy longer-dated ones since they had insufficient holdings of short-dated Treasuries.

On December 18, 2013, the Federal Reserve Open Market Committee announced they would be tapering back on QE3 at a rate of $10 billion at each meeting. The Federal Reserve ended its monthly asset purchases program (QE3) in October 2014, ten months after it began the tapering process.

=== December 2015 historic interest rate hike ===
On December 16, 2015, the Fed increased its key interest rate, the Federal Funds Rate, for the first time since June 2006. The hike was from the range [0%, 0.25%] to the range [0.25%, 0.5%].

=== March 2020 Coronavirus interest rate cut ===
In an emergency decision the rate was cut by half a percentage point on March 3, 2020, to 1–1.25% in response to the risk that the Coronavirus pandemic in the United States poses to the American economy. It was the first emergency cut since the 2008 financial crisis.

=== March 2020 Coronavirus bond buying program ===
In an effort to calm markets and sustain market liquidity, the Federal Reserve announced to buy corporate debt in a series of emergency lending programs on March 23, 2020. By July 2020, it has purchased $3 trillion financial assets, increasing its balance sheet from $4.2 trillion in February to $7 trillion. Since August 2020, it was committed to monthly bond-buying program. By January 2021, its balance sheet stood at $7.3 trillion. It continued to pledge bond purchases in the pace of $120 billion a month to allow the economy to recover from the pandemic over the second half of the year as vaccinations against COVID-19 roll out.

== Historical actions ==
Currently, this only shows meetings, both scheduled and unscheduled "emergency" meetings. The FOMC makes a number of other important pronouncements as well such as during testimony to Congress whose effects are harder to quantify.

Key
Easing
No change
Tightening
Inter-meeting action

FOMC Federal Funds Rate History
Date	Fed. Funds Rate	Discount Rate	Votes	Notes
October 28, 2026	3.75%–4.00%	4.00%	10–2	Lisa Cook and Beth Hammack preferred a 25-basis-point increase. Official Statement
September 16, 2026	3.75%–4.00%	4.00%	12–0	Official Statement
July 29, 2026	3.50%–3.75%	3.75%	9–3	Beth Hammack, Neel Kashkari, and Lorie Logan preferred a 25-basis-point increase. Official statement
June 17, 2026	3.50%–3.75%	3.75%	12–0	Official statement
April 29, 2026	3.50%–3.75%	3.75%	8–4	Stephen Miran preferred a 25-basis-point cut. Beth Hammack, Neel Kashkari, and Lorie Logan agreed with maintaining the rate, but did not support inclusion of an easing bias in the statement at this time. Official statement
March 18, 2026	3.50%–3.75%	3.75%	11–1	Stephen Miran preferred a 25-basis-point cut. Official statement
January 28, 2026	3.50%–3.75%	3.75%	10–2	Stephen Miran and Christopher Waller preferred a 25-basis-point cut. Official statement
December 10, 2025	3.50%–3.75%	3.75%	9–3	Stephen Miran preferred a higher 50-basis-point cut, while Austan Goolsbee and Jeffrey Schmid preferred to maintain the rate. Official statement
October 29, 2025	3.75%–4.00%	4.00%	10–2	Stephen Miran preferred a higher 50-basis-point cut, while Jeffrey Schmid preferred to maintain the rate. Official statement
September 17, 2025	4.00%–4.25%	4.25%	11–1	Stephen Miran preferred a higher 50-basis-point cut. Official statement
July 30, 2025	4.25%–4.50%	4.50%	9–2	Michelle Bowman and Christopher Waller preferred a 25-basis-point cut. Official statement
June 18, 2025	4.25%–4.50%	4.50%	12–0	Official statement
May 7, 2025	4.25%–4.50%	4.50%	12–0	Official statement
March 19, 2025	4.25%–4.50%	4.50%	11–1	Christopher Waller preferred to "continue the current pace of decline in securities holdings", while supporting no change for the federal funds target range. Official statement
January 29, 2025	4.25%–4.50%	4.50%	12–0	Official statement
December 18, 2024	4.25%–4.50%	4.50%	11–1	Beth M. Hammack preferred to maintain the rate. Official statement
November 7, 2024	4.50%–4.75%	4.75%	12–0	Official statement
September 18, 2024	4.75%–5.00%	5.00%	11–1	Michelle Bowman preferred a lower 25-basis-point cut. Official statement
July 31, 2024	5.25%–5.50%	5.50%	12–0	Official statement
June 12, 2024	5.25%–5.50%	5.50%	12–0	Official statement
May 1, 2024	5.25%–5.50%	5.50%	12–0	Official statement
March 20, 2024	5.25%–5.50%	5.50%	12–0	Official statement
January 31, 2024	5.25%–5.50%	5.50%	12–0	Official statement
December 13, 2023	5.25%–5.50%	5.50%	12–0	Official statement
November 1, 2023	5.25%–5.50%	5.50%	12–0	Official statement
September 20, 2023	5.25%–5.50%	5.50%	12–0	Official statement
July 26, 2023	5.25%–5.50%	5.50%	11–0	Official statement
June 14, 2023	5.00%–5.25%	5.25%	11–0	Official statement
May 3, 2023	5.00%–5.25%	5.25%	11–0	Official statement
March 22, 2023	4.75%–5.00%	5.00%	11–0	Official statement
February 1, 2023	4.50%–4.75%	4.75%	12–0	Official statement
December 14, 2022	4.25%–4.50%	4.50%	12–0	Official statement
November 2, 2022	3.75%–4.00%	4.00%	12–0	Official statement
September 21, 2022	3.00%–3.25%	3.25%	12–0	Official statement
July 27, 2022	2.25%–2.50%	2.50%	12–0	Official statement
June 15, 2022	1.50%–1.75%	1.75%	8–1	Announced biggest rate hike since 1994 to continue combat inflation. George dissented, preferring a 50-basis-point upward adjustment to the policy rate. Official statement
May 4, 2022	0.75%–1.00%	1.00%	9–0	Announced biggest rate hike since May 2000 to combat inflation. Official statement
March 16, 2022	0.25%–0.50%	0.50%	8–1	Bullard dissented, preferring a 50-basis-point upward adjustment to the policy rate, reaching a policy rate above 3% in 2022. Official statement
December 15, 2021	0%–0.25%	0.25%	11-0	Official statement
November 3, 2021	0%–0.25%	0.25%	11-0	Official statement
September 22, 2021	0%–0.25%	0.25%	11-0	Official statement
July 28, 2021	0%–0.25%	0.25%	11-0	Official statement
June 16, 2021	0%–0.25%	0.25%	11-0	Official statement
April 28, 2021	0%–0.25%	0.25%	11-0	Official statement
March 17, 2021	0%–0.25%	0.25%	11-0	Official statement
January 27, 2021	0%–0.25%	0.25%	11-0	Official statement
December 16, 2020	0%–0.25%	0.25%	10-0	Official statement
November 5, 2020	0%–0.25%	0.25%	10-0	Official statement
September 16, 2020	0%–0.25%	0.25%	8-2	Kaplan dissented, preferring "the Committee [to] retain greater policy rate flexibility". Kashkari dissented, preferring a stronger message regarding to keep "the current target range until core inflation has reached 2% on a sustained basis". Official statement
August 27, 2020	0%–0.25%	0.25%	unanimous	No meeting, but announcement of approval of updates to the statement on longer-run goals and monetary policy strategy. Most importantly, the FOMC decided to adjusts its strategy towards an average inflation target of 2% over time, instead of an upper limit of the inflation target at 2%. Official statement
July 29, 2020	0%–0.25%	0.25%	10-0	Official statement
June 10, 2020	0%–0.25%	0.25%	10-0	Official statement
April 29, 2020	0%–0.25%	0.25%	10-0	Official statement
March 31, 2020	0%–0.25%	0.25%		This was an emergency action in response to the Coronavirus pandemic in the United States. The Federal Reserve announced to open a temporary repurchase agreement facility accessible to foreign and international monetary authorities (FIMA Repo Facility). Official statement
March 23, 2020	0%–0.25%	0.25%	10-0	This was an emergency action in response to the Coronavirus pandemic in the United States. The FOMC announced to widen its treasury securities and agency mortgage-backed securities purchase operations. Official statement
March 19, 2020	0%–0.25%	0.25%		This was an emergency action in response to the Coronavirus pandemic in the United States. The Federal Reserve announced the establishment of temporary U.S. dollar liquidity arrangements with other central banks. Official statement
March 15, 2020	0%–0.25%	0.25%	9–1	This was an emergency unscheduled meeting in response to the Coronavirus pandemic in the United States. Official statement
March 3, 2020	1%–1.25%	2.75%	10–0	This was an emergency unscheduled meeting in response to the Coronavirus pandemic in the United States. Official statement
October 30, 2019	1.50%–1.75%	2.75%	8–2	Official statement
September 18, 2019	1.75%–2.00%	2.75%	7–3	Official statement
July 31, 2019	2.00%–2.25%	2.75%	8–2	President Donald Trump demanded a cut though a bigger one. Official statement
December 19, 2018	2.25%–2.50%	3.00%	10–0	Discount rate minutes
September 26, 2018	2.00%–2.25%	2.75%	9–0	Official statement
June 13, 2018	1.75%–2.00%	2.50%	8–0	Official statement
March 21, 2018	1.50%–1.75%	2.25%	8–0	Official statement
December 13, 2017	1.25%–1.50%	2.00%	7–2	Kashkari and Evans both dissented due to flattening yield curve concerns. Official statement
June 14, 2017	1.00%–1.25%	1.75%	8–1	Official statement
March 15, 2017	0.75%–1.00%	1.50%	9–1	Official statement
December 14, 2016	0.50%–0.75%	1.25%	10–0	Official statement
December 16, 2015	0.25%–0.50%	1.00%	10–0	Official statement
June 22, 2011	0.00%–0.25%	0.75%	10–0	Official statement
December 16, 2008	0.00%–0.25%	0.50%	10–0	Official statement See also: ZIRP
October 29, 2008	1.00%	1.25%	10–0	Official statement
October 8, 2008	1.50%	1.75%		This was an emergency unscheduled meeting in response to a rapidly weakening economy, made in coordination with several other central banks around the world. Official statement
September 16, 2008	2.00%	2.25%	10-0	The FOMC left rates unchanged the day after the Bankruptcy of Lehman Brothers. Official Statement
August 5, 2008	2.00%	2.25%	10–1	The Federal Open Market Committee decided today to keep its target for the federal funds rate at 2 percent. Official statement
April 30, 2008	2.00%	2.25%	8–2	The FOMC cut rates by 25 basis points. They drew back on their easing bias somewhat by removing "downside risks to growth remain" from its statement, but left no sign of a future pause to the interest rate cuts. Fisher and Plosser dissented, preferring no change. Official statement
March 18, 2008	2.25%	2.50%	8–2	The FOMC made another unusually large cut, slashing 75 basis points off the federal funds rate in response to turmoil in the markets and the collapse of Bear Stearns. Despite some predicting an even larger 100 basis point cut, the markets rallied in response. Fisher and Plosser dissented, preferring a smaller cut. Official statement
March 16, 2008	3.00%	3.25%	10–0	This was an emergency unscheduled meeting in response to the meltdown at Bear Stearns. The FOMC arranged loan securities for JPMorgan Chase and greased a buyout of Bear Stearns to make certain that Bear's debts would be backed. It also provided for the creation of a fund to swap safe Treasury securities for less secure ones held by banks. It lastly shaved the difference between the discount rate and the federal funds rate from 50 basis points to 25. Official statement
January 30, 2008	3.00%	3.50%	9–1	Fisher dissented, preferring no change. Official statement
January 22, 2008	3.50%	4.00%	8–1	This was an intermeeting rate cut held in response to the January stock downturn, with the results announced Tuesday morning before the U.S. market opened. Poole dissented, saying that emergency action was not required and could wait for the scheduled meeting. Mishkin was absent. Official statement
December 11, 2007	4.25%	4.75%	9–1	Rosengren dissented, preferring a 50 basis point cut. The markets, disappointed with a 25 basis point cut, fell in response; the Fed issued a statement the day after (December 12) pledging an increased money supply to the markets in conjunction with other central banks. Official statement 2007-12-11, Official statement 2007-12-12
October 31, 2007	4.50%	5.00%	9–1	Hoenig dissented, preferring no change. Official statement
September 18, 2007	4.75%	5.25%	10–0	Official statement
August 17, 2007	5.25%	5.75%	10–0	The subprime mortgage crisis roiled the markets shortly after the Fed's August 7 meeting, causing the board to release a statement on August 10 saying that they were prepared to act in response to the downturn and had increased liquidity. In an unscheduled meeting on August 17 the Fed "temporarily" reduced the spread between the primary credit rate and the federal funds rate to 50 basis points from the 100-point spread established in January 2002. Official statement, 2007-08-07, Official statement, 2007-08-10, Official statement, 2007-08-17.
August 7, 2007	5.25%	6.25%	10–0	Official statement
June 28, 2007	5.25%	6.25%	10–0	Official statement
May 9, 2007	5.25%	6.25%	10–0	Official statement
March 21, 2007	5.25%	6.25%	10–0	Bies recused herself. Official statement
January 31, 2007	5.25%	6.25%	11–0	Official statement
December 12, 2006	5.25%	6.25%	10–1	Lacker dissented, preferring a 25 basis point increase. Official statement
October 25, 2006	5.25%	6.25%	10–1	Lacker dissented, preferring a 25 basis point increase. Official statement
September 20, 2006	5.25%	6.25%	10–1	Lacker dissented, preferring a 25 basis point increase. First vote from Frederic Mishkin after his appointment. Official statement
August 8, 2006	5.25%	6.25%	9–1	The Fed kept rates stable this meeting; they had raised the rates by 25 basis points for seventeen consecutive meetings prior. Lacker dissented, preferring a 25 basis point increase. Official statement
June 29, 2006	5.25%	6.25%	10–0	Mark W. Olson not voting, as his appointment and departure for the Public Company Accounting Oversight Board in July has already been announced. Official statement
May 10, 2006	5.00%	6.00%	11–0	Official statement
March 28, 2006	4.75%	5.75%	11–0	This was Ben Bernanke's first meeting as new chairman, replacing Alan Greenspan. He continued Greenspan's policy of gradual tightening and pledged increased transparency for the Federal Reserve. Official statement
January 31, 2006	4.50%	5.50%	10–0	Official statement
December 13, 2005	4.25%	5.25%	10–0	Official statement
November 1, 2005	4.00%	5.00%	10–0	Official statement
September 20, 2005	3.75%	4.75%	9–1	Olson dissented, preferring no change. Official statement
August 9, 2005	3.50%	4.50%	10–0	Edward Gramlich not voting, as his return to the University of Michigan in September has already been announced. Official statement
June 30, 2005	3.25%	4.25%	11–0	Official statement
May 3, 2005	3.00%	4.00%	11–0	Ben Bernanke not voting, as his appointment and departure for the Council of Economic Advisers to the White House in June has already been announced. Official statement
March 22, 2005	2.75%	3.75%	12–0	Official statement
February 2, 2005	2.50%	3.50%	12–0	Official statement
December 14, 2004	2.25%	3.25%	12–0	The FOMC changed their previous policy on the release of the minutes from each meeting. Previously, the minutes were released only after the next meeting had already finished, rendering them only of historical interest; this was changed to be released three weeks after the date of a policy decision. The minutes thus became available for predicting the FOMC's action in the next meeting. Official statement
November 10, 2004	2.00%	3.00%	12–0	Official statement
September 21, 2004	1.75%	2.75%	12–0	Official statement
August 10, 2004	1.50%	2.50%	12–0	Official statement
June 30, 2004	1.25%	2.25%	12–0	Official statement
May 4, 2004	1.00%	2.00%	12–0	Official statement
March 16, 2004	1.00%	2.00%	12–0	Official statement
January 28, 2004	1.00%	2.00%	12–0	Official statement
December 9, 2003	1.00%	2.00%	12–0	Official statement
October 28, 2003	1.00%	2.00%	12–0	Official statement
September 16, 2003	1.00%	2.00%	12–0	Official statement
August 12, 2003	1.00%	2.00%	12–0	Official statement
June 25, 2003	1.00%	2.00%	11–1	Parry dissented, preferring a 50 basis point cut. Official statement
May 6, 2003	1.25%	2.25%	12–0	Official statement
March 18, 2003	1.25%	2.25%	12–0	Official statement
January 29, 2003	1.25%	2.25%	12–0	Official statement
January 9, 2003	1.25%	2.25%		No meeting, but new discount window rules introduced in October were implemented. These mandated a discount rate 100 basis points higher than the federal funds rate, effectively hiking it by 150 basis points. Official statement
December 10, 2002	1.25%	0.75%	12–0	Official statement
November 6, 2002	1.25%	0.75%	12–0	Official statement
September 24, 2002	1.75%	1.25%	10-2	Official statement Governors Edward M. Gramlich and Robert D. McTeer Jr. voted against the action (in favor of a reduction of the fed funds rate target).
August 13, 2002	1.75%	1.25%	12-0	Official statement
June 26, 2002	1.75%	1.25%	10-0	Official statement
May 7, 2002	1.75%	1.25%	10-0	Official statement
March 19, 2002	1.75%	1.25%	10-0	Official statement
January 30, 2002	1.75%	1.25%		Official statement
December 11, 2001	1.75%	1.25%		Official statement
November 6, 2001	2.00%	1.50%		Official statement
October 2, 2001	2.50%	2.00%		Official statement
September 17, 2001	3.00%	2.50%		Official statement In reaction to the terrorist attacks of September 11, 2001 the FOMC held two conference calls on September 13 and September 17.
August 21, 2001	3.50%	3.00%		Official statement
June 27, 2001	3.75%	3.25%		Official statement
May 15, 2001	4.00%	3.50%		Official statement
April 18, 2001	4.50%	4.00%		Official statement Conference Call
March 20, 2001	5.00%	4.50%		Official statement
January 31, 2001	5.50%	5.00%		Official statement
January 3, 2001	6.00%	5.75%		Official statement Conference Call
December 19, 2000	6.50%	6.00%		Official statement
November 15, 2000	6.50%	6.00%		Official statement
October 3, 2000	6.50%	6.00%		Official statement
August 22, 2000	6.50%	6.00%		Official statement
June 28, 2000	6.50%	6.00%		Official statement
May 16, 2000	6.50%	6.00%		Official statement
March 21, 2000	6.00%	5.50%		Official statement
February 2, 2000	5.75%	5.25%		Official statement
