= Texas First Bank =

- Company type: Privately held company
- Industry: Banking
- Founded: January 3, 1973; 52 years ago in Hitchcock, TX
- Founder: Charles T. Doyle
- Headquarters: Texas City, Texas, USA
- Number of locations: 26 branches, 52 ATMs
- Products: Checking accounts; Savings accounts; Loans; Mortgage; Small Business Administration loans
- Services: Financial services; Insurance; Investments; Treasury management
- Parent: Texas Independent Bancshares
- Website: www.texasfirst.bank

Texas First Bank is a privately held, state-chartered bank headquartered in Texas City, Texas. It serves the Texas Gulf Coast region and operates 26 full-service branches and 52 ATMs across seven counties: Galveston, Chambers, Brazoria, Harris, Jefferson, Montgomery, and Liberty. The bank is a subsidiary of Texas Independent Bancshares, Inc. and has operated under a Subchapter S Corporation structure since 2014. Its services include personal banking, commercial banking, lending, insurance, and wealth management.

== History ==
The bank was established in 1973, following the purchase of the First State Bank of Hitchcock by Charles T. "Chuck" Doyle and a group of investors. The group aimed to establish a network of community banks in all ten incorporated cities in Galveston County by the end of the Twentieth Century. Over the following decades, the organization expanded through a series of acquisitions and new branch opening, including Galveston (1975), Santa Fe (1977), Texas City (1982), and Crystal beach (1985). On August 3, 1995, all affiliated banks were consolidated under a single brand name – Texas First Bank.

In 2000, the bank entered the insurance sector by acquiring Rust, Ewing, Watt, and Haney Insurance. It added to its mortgage services in 2004 with the acquisition of Paramount Mortgage in League City and later renamed Texas First Mortgage. In January 2005, it opened a Small Business Administration (SBA) lending division in Pearland, Texas.

Further growth occurred through mergers and acquisitions, including the Gulf Coast Bank (2006), Sullivan Insurance Agency (2008), Houston Business Bank and Texas Coastal Bank (2012), and Hull State Bank (2014). In 2018, the bank acquired Assurance One Group, followed by all Preferred Bank locations in 2019. That same year, Texas Independent Bancshares received Federal Reserve approval to merge with Preferred Bancshares, adding five branches in the Greater Houston area, including The Woodlands, Spring, and Conroe, Texas.

In 2022, a new branch was opened in Beaumont, Texas. In February 2024, the bank launched its first "Texas First" location in Conroe, combining banking, insurance, SBA lending, and mortgage services.

Texas First Bank marked its 50th anniversary in 2023.

== Leadership ==
Texas First Bank remains under the leadership of the Doyle family.

Charles T. “Chuck” Doyle, the founding chairman, now serves as Chairman Emeritus. He became the first community banker on the Federal Advisory Council to the Board of Governors of the Federal Reserve in Washington, D.C. Chuck Doyle has served on advisory councils for the Federal Reserve Bank of Dallas, Visa Inc., and the Independent Bankers Association of Texas (IBAT). From 1990 to 2000, Chuck Doyle served as the mayor of Texas, City. In 2015, he was inducted into the Texas Bankers Hall of Fame for his achievements in community banking. Chuck Doyle and his wife, Mary Ellen Doyle, received the "Citizens of the Year" award in 2019 and the IBAT Five*Star Chairman's award for their contribution to the industry in 2024.

Matthew T. Doyle, son of the founder, is the current Chairman of the Board, overseeing corporate governance and strategic planning. From May 2004 until May 2022, Matthew served as mayor of Texas City, Texas. Matthew serves on the Board of Directors for the Galveston Central Appraisal District and for the Galveston Bay Foundation.

Chris Doyle serves as the bank’s current President and Chief Executive Officer of Texas First Bank. He also serves on the Boards of Texas Independent Bancshares Inc., Texas First Bank, Texas First Insurance, Victory Bank in Lubbock, Texas, Independent Bankers Association of Texas, CBANC, ICBA and ICBA Payments. In the past, Chris has served as director of the Federal Reserve Bank of Dallas—Houston Branch which begun in 2015 and concluded with his re-election term in 2021. Chris has been listed as "Houston's Most Admired For-Profit CEO" and was an honor inductee for the TCISD Foundation for the Future.

== Regulatory and Financial Information ==
Texas First Bank is regulated as a state-chartered bank and is insured by the Federal Deposit Insurance Corporation (FDIC). In March 2017, the bank reported total assets of $1 billion which later increased to approximately $1.4 billion following the 2019 merger with Preferred Shares. As of 2025, Texas First Bank reports its assets at $2.3 billion.

== Community Involvement ==
In July 2025, Texas First Bank launched a Flood Recovery Fund to support communities in Central Texas affected by severe flooding. The bank pledged to match donations up to $100,000, with all proceeds going to vetted relief organizations through the Community Foundation of the Texas Hill Country.

Texas First Bank is a member of the Independent Community Bankers of America (ICBA).

== Sources ==
- FDIC Institution Directory
- Texas First Bank Website
