= Federal Reserve Bank of Dallas El Paso Branch =

Coordinates: 31°45′40″N 106°29′15″W

The Reserve Bank of Dallas El Paso Branch is one of three branches of the Federal Reserve Bank of Dallas. The branch is located in downtown El Paso, Texas at 301 E. Main St.

== Current Board of Directors ==
The following people are on the board of directors as of 2013:

=== Appointed by the Federal Reserve Bank ===
Appointed by the Federal Reserve Bank
Name	Title	Term Expires
Larry L. Patton	President and Chief Executive Officer; WestStar Bank; El Paso, Texas	2013
Laura M. Conniff	Qualifying Broker; Mathers Realty, Inc. Las Cruces, New Mexico	2014
Jerry Pacheco	President; Global Perspectives Integrated, Inc; Santa Teresa, New Mexico	2014
Robert Nachtmann	Dean and Professor of Finance; University of Texas at El Paso; El Paso, Texas	2015

=== Appointed by the Board of Governors ===
Appointed by the Board of Governors
Name	Title	Term Expires
Cindy J. Ramos-Davidson (Chair)	President and Chief Executive Officer; El Paso Hispanic Chamber of Commerce; El Paso, Texas	2013
Robert E. McKnight Jr.	Owner; McKnight Ranch Company; Fort Davis, Texas	2014
Renard U. Johnson	President and Chief Executive Officer; Management & Engineering Technologies, Inc. El Paso, Texas	2015

== See also ==
- Federal Reserve Act
- Federal Reserve System
- Federal Reserve Bank
- Federal Reserve Districts
- Federal Reserve Branches
- Structure of the Federal Reserve System
- Federal Reserve Bank of Dallas
- Federal Reserve Bank of Dallas Houston Branch
- Federal Reserve Bank of Dallas San Antonio Branch
