= Robert Kaplan =

Robert Kaplan may refer to:

- Robert D. Kaplan (born 1952), American author
- Robert S. Kaplan (born 1940), business theorist and professor of accounting at Harvard Business School
- Robert Steven Kaplan (born 1957), former president of the Federal Reserve Bank of Dallas and professor of management practice at Harvard Business School
- Bob Kaplan (1936–2012), Canadian Liberal MP
