= Miles Fisher =

American actor and musician (born 1983)

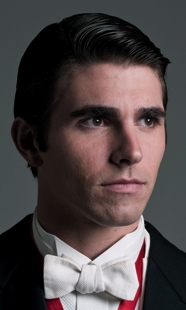
- Fisher in 2009
- Born: James Leslie Miles Fisher; June 23, 1983 (age 43); Dallas, Texas, U.S.
- Education: Harvard University
- Occupations: Actor; musician; comedian; entrepreneur
- Years active: 1997–present
- Spouse: Lucette Blodgett (m. 2014)
- Children: 1
- Father: Richard W. Fisher
- Relatives: James M. Collins (grandfather); Michael Blodgett (father-in-law)
- Website: Official website

James Leslie Miles Fisher (born June 23, 1983) is an American actor, comedian, entrepreneur and musician. He made his debut in the CBS adaptation of the book True Women and starred in the 2000 film Lone Star Struck. In 2001, for his role in his short film Head Shot, Fisher won Best Actor at the International Teen Movie Festival.

Fisher appeared in the 2003 Civil War film Gods and Generals, and parodied actor Tom Cruise in the 2008 film Superhero Movie. He had a recurring role as a rookie police officer in 2008 on the television series The Cleaner, and appeared on Gossip Girl in 2009. On the third season of the television series Mad Men, Fisher portrayed a friend of character Paul Kinsey. In 2011, he played Peter Friedkin in Final Destination 5.

Outside of acting, Fisher has co-founded Metaphysic and Bixby Roasting Co, which was acquired in 2023.

== Early life and education ==
Fisher is the son of Richard W. Fisher, who was formerly the president of the Federal Reserve Bank of Dallas. His mother, Nancy, served on the national board of the American Film Institute (AFI). His maternal grandfather was Representative James Collins. He was raised in Dallas, Texas, where he attended the St. Mark's School of Texas. After his family moved to Washington, D.C., he attended the St. Albans School.

Fisher graduated from Harvard University, where he was an English major. At Harvard, he was a member of the Porcellian Club, the Hasty Pudding Club and the a cappella singing group the Krokodiloes. Fisher served as the Krokodiloes tour manager, and planned events for the group in 24 countries. He was one of the two students chosen to deliver a Harvard Oration at the 2006 Harvard graduation ceremony. His undergraduate thesis, which won the LeBaron Russell Briggs prize at Harvard, was a "screenplay about a Harvard graduate who avoided the Vietnam draft by teaching in a military prep school".

== Career ==
Fisher appeared in the 1997 CBS television movie adaptation of the book True Women as "Travis", and had a starring role in the 2000 film Lone Star Struck. He received the Best Actor award at the 2001 International Teen Movie Festival (ITMF) in Vaughan, Ontario, Canada, for his own short film titled: Head Shot, which was among 10,000 other entries at the festival.

=== 2000s ===
In a 2001 article in Newsday titled: "Miles Fisher, 'It' Boy", columnist Liz Smith referred to Fisher as "wunderkind" and "the next Tom Cruise". Smith's comparison of Fisher to Tom Cruise led to meetings with influential managers and agents, and he signed with the talent agency Endeavor Talent Agency in 2002. Fisher appeared in the 2003 Civil War film Gods and Generals with Robert Duvall. Director Ron Maxwell picked Fisher to portray a heroic member of the First Regiment of Virginia Volunteers in the film; Duvall played Robert E. Lee.

He parodied actor Tom Cruise in the 2008 film Superhero Movie. Fisher's role in the film was popularized on the Internet on sites including Defamer, as well as on television on Entertainment Tonight and the CNN program Showbiz Tonight. The clip of Fisher was viewed on the Internet over 10 million times. A critic for The Baltimore Sun commented that Fisher's appearance in Superhero Movie was the highlight of the film, and wrote: "Actor Miles Fisher replicates Tom Cruise's 'I am the Way, the Thetan, the Light' Scientology recruiting video of last year to hilarious effect." He had a recurring role on A&E Network's television series The Cleaner, portraying a rookie police officer named Kenneth Herman.

Fisher wrote and produced a short film called Heatshot in 2009 with Evan Nichols; the film was selected to be screened at the AFI Dallas International Film Festival. Alan Peppard of The Dallas Morning News reported in March 2009 that Fisher had been cast in the pilot of a television show set in 1983 in Southern California; a spinoff of Gossip Girl. He portrayed a "sleazy" coke dealer on the television series of the same name.

In July 2009, Fisher released an independently produced self-titled EP, Miles Fisher, as well as a music video for his cover of the Talking Heads song "This Must Be The Place." The video is an homage to the 2000 film American Psycho, with Fisher imitating Christian Bale's performance as Patrick Bateman. Students from the American Film Institute helped film the video, which was shot in Los Angeles. The video was posted on YouTube and various other web sites, and received 200,000 hits on Break.com alone within the first 24 hours. Darrell Hartman of Interview called the usage of the Talking Heads song with the American Psycho theme "a brilliant combo", and noted that Fisher "created a viral hit".

=== 2010s ===
On the third season of the television series Mad Men, Fisher portrayed Geoff Graves, a friend of character Paul Kinsey. Jessica Gelt of the Los Angeles Times described his character as a "preppy drug dealer". In 2010, Fisher was cast in the film Final Destination 5. In an interview with Collider.com, Fisher revealed that the film was set in a workplace environment, and was a 3-D film. Fisher appeared in Clint Eastwood's J. Edgar Hoover biopic, J. Edgar, playing Agent Garrison, an FBI employee who interviews Leonardo DiCaprio's Hoover throughout the film.

Fisher released the song "New Romance" in video and MP3 form on iTunes and on his personal website on July 19, 2011. The video parodies the Final Destination series and Saved by the Bell. Additionally, he appeared in the fifth film of the Final Destination franchise, playing Peter Friedkin.

On May 22, 2013, a music video for "Finish What We Started" through AboveAverageNetwork on YouTube was posted. The music video featuring Lance Bass has yet to release a single for the song, and a subsequent album has been released, dubbed "Video Music." The music video has been posted to Fisher's personal website.

=== 2020s ===
In the early 2020s, Fisher saw a deepfake video by Chris Ume, a Belgian visual effects (VFX) artist in which Fisher's eyes were replaced with those of Tom Cruise. Fisher and Ume subsequently collaborated to produce YouTube and TikTok videos of Fisher performing mundane or silly tasks while posing as Cruise, satirizing Cruise's haughty and aloof public persona. The videos quickly went viral, collecting millions of views in only a few days. Fisher has not monetized the videos and has deliberately avoided topics of a potentially personal or controversial nature, as he has not received permission from Cruise to use his likeness for profit; Fisher characterized the effort as "good-natured parody" inspired by years of being called the "Tom Cruise guy" due to his similar appearance.

== Business ventures ==
In 2017, Fisher co-founded the Bixby Roasting Company with Remington Hotchkis in Los Angeles, CA. The company began with a Kickstarter campaign as CUPS, before launching Bixby. In February 2023, Westrock Coffee Company acquired the Bixby brand and roasting facility, with Fisher becoming the senior vice president of Sales at Westrock.

In 2021, Fisher co-founded Metaphysic, a technology company focusing on generative AI, alongside VFX artist and AI user Chris Ume and CEO Tom Graham on the back of the “Deep Tom Cruise” deepfake videos.

== Personal life ==
In 2014, Miles married Lucette Blodgett, daughter of actor and writer Michael Blodgett. They were introduced by broadcaster Willow Bay. They had their first child, a daughter, in October 2017.

== Filmography ==
=== Films ===
Year	Title	Role	Notes
2000	Lone Star Struck	Val	
2003	Gods and Generals	John Beale	
2008	Superhero Movie	Tom Cruise	
2009	Head in the Sand	SPC Henry Burch	
2010	My First Claire	Brad	
2011	Final Destination 5	Peter Friedkin	
2011	J. Edgar	Agent Garrison	
2011	Have a Little Faith	Ricky	TV movie
2012	Underneath Your Love	Leon	
2014	Believe Me	Pierce	
2016	Me Him Her	Scotty	
2016	Wolves at the Door	Jay Sebring	
2016	The Counselor	Ted	Short film
2017	The Truth About Lies	Kevin	
2018	A Christmas Arrangement	Garrett Hurley	Lifetime Movie
2025	Playdate	Trent	

=== Television ===
Year	Title	Role	Notes
1997	True Women	Young Travis McPoon	TV movie
2008	The Cleaner	Officer Kenneth Herman	Ep. # 1.1, 1.9
2009	Gossip Girl	Klemmer	Ep. # 2.24
2009	Mad Men	Jeffrey Graves	Ep. # 3.3
2011	Psych	The Mantis	Ep. # 6.4
2011	Death Valley	Travis Flynn	Ep. # 1.7
2013	Bad Sports	Chad Whipple	Main role
2014	Review with Forrest MacNeil	Thad Valentine	Ep. # 1.7
2016	Playdates	Super Dad Dave	Unknown episodes
2016	Rush Hour	Thomas Shea	Unknown episode
2015	Man Seeking Woman	Graham	Recurring
2016	2 Broke Girls	Adam	Ep. # 5.12
2017	Destiny 2	Titan	Live Action Trailer
2018	The Mick	Father Zach	Ep. # 2.14
2025	Chicago Fire	Gym Guy	Ep. # 13.17

== Discography ==
=== Albums ===
- Video Music (2013)

=== EPs ===
- Miles Fisher (2009)

=== Singles ===
- "This Must Be the Place (Naive Melody)" (2009) (cover of the Talking Heads song)
- "New Romance" (2011)
- "Don't Let Go" (2011)
- "Finish What We Started" (2013) (written by Miles Fisher, Robert Schwartzman, Joe Jonas, John Lloyd Taylor)
- "Finish What We Started (Andrew Maury Remix)" (feat. Joe Jonas) (2013) (written by Miles Fisher, Robert Schwartzman, Joe Jonas and John Lloyd Taylor)

=== Music videos ===
Year	Song	Director	Album
2009	"This Must Be the Place"	Dave Green	Miles Fisher
2011	"New Romance"	Dave Green	Miles Fisher
2012	"Don't Let Go"	Michael Ashton	Miles Fisher

== Awards and nominations ==
Year	Award	Work	Category	Result
2001	International Teen Movie Festival	Head Shot	Best Actor	Won
2006	LeBaron Russell Briggs prize	Screenplay about Vietnam War	Undergraduate thesis	Won

== See also ==
- Notable alumni of St. Mark's School of Texas
