= Wolves at the Door =

2016 film by John R. Leonetti

- Digital release poster
- Directed by: John R. Leonetti
- Written by: Gary Dauberman
- Produced by: Peter Safran
- Starring: Katie Cassidy; Elizabeth Henstridge; Adam Campbell; Miles Fisher
- Cinematography: Michael St. Hilaire
- Edited by: Ken Blackwell
- Music by: Toby Chu
- Production companies: New Line Cinema; The Safran Company
- Distributed by: Warner Bros. Pictures
- Release dates: October 21, 2016 (India); April 18, 2017 (United States)
- Running time: 72 minutes
- Country: United States
- Language: English
- Box office: $4,382

Wolves at the Door is a 2016 American horror film directed by John R. Leonetti and written by Gary Dauberman. The film is loosely based on the murder of Sharon Tate, the pregnant wife of Roman Polanski, and her friends in 1969 by members of the Manson Family, and, though not considered an installment in the franchise, takes place within The Conjuring Universe. The cast features Katie Cassidy, Elizabeth Henstridge, Adam Campbell and Miles Fisher as four friends who are stalked and murdered by a group of intruders at a farewell party, with Eric Ladin reprising his role as Detective Clarkin from Leonetti's 2014 film Annabelle.

The film, produced by New Line Cinema and The Safran Company and distributed by Warner Bros. Pictures, was first theatrically released in India on October 21, 2016, followed by Germany on March 2, 2017, and in the United Kingdom on March 17, 2017. It was released on Digital HD in the United States on April 18, 2017. It was panned by critics, garnering a rare 0% approval rating on Rotten Tomatoes. The film was mainly criticized for its depiction of the Tate murders and was described as "exploitative" and "misconceived."

== Plot ==
In 1969, John and Mary, a married couple asleep in their bed, are awakened in the middle of the night by knocks on their doors and windows. John goes downstairs to investigate but finds nothing. As he gets back into bed, he hears a crash downstairs. He sees the shadow of a man saying "Little Pig". As he runs back to his wife, he locks the door. After calling the police, the intruders break open the door. Later, the intruders write messages in blood on the walls of the house, but leave before Detective Clarkin and the police arrive at the scene.

The following night, Sharon, Jay, Wojciech, and Abigail commemorate Abigail's upcoming move back to Boston with a celebratory dinner at El Coyote in Hollywood, even though Wojciech is upset that Abby is allowing her parents to influence her decision. After dinner, the four friends return to Sharon's house for the evening. A pregnant Sharon calls her husband from the nursery, but suddenly the line goes dead. Meanwhile, Steven arrives at the property to see his friend William, who lives in the guesthouse. After selling William a stereo, Steven tries to leave, only to find the driveway gate disabled. He gets out and opens the gate, but his vehicle turns off unexpectedly. As he returns to his vehicle, he turns his headlights on to see a man standing in front of his truck and a woman standing behind his truck. He is then pulled out of the vehicle and attacked with a sledgehammer.

Wojciech goes outside to have a cigarette. As he approaches the truck in the driveway, he sees a man slumped over. He approaches the truck, but the man lunges at him and chases him to the front door which is locked. The attackers stab Wojciech, drag his body back to the house and leave him in the shower. Later, the intruders write the word "Pig" in blood on the front door. In Sharon's bedroom, she and Abigail become concerned when they observe a young woman prowling the premises. Meanwhile, Jay is stabbed to death while sleeping on the couch. When the two hear Jay screaming, they return to discover his dead body and try to hide throughout the house as the intruders stalk them. While Abigail fights with an attacker, Sharon hides in the bathroom and finds Wojciech, who is still alive. One intruder breaks down the door to capture both Sharon and Wojciech. Sharon and Wojciech are dragged through the hallway as Abigail escapes the house.

Abigail tries to get help from William, but he is unable to hear because of his music. One of the intruders catches Abigail and carries her to the house. She is taken back to a bedroom where Sharon and Wojciech are also being held. An intruder enters the bedroom and drags Sharon away. Wojciech and Abigail fight their way outside, but Wojciech is stabbed to death on the lawn. An injured Abigail makes it to the street to flag down a car, but finds it is occupied by two of the intruders. She falls to the ground, gazing at the locket Sharon gave to her, as the two intruders approach her with a bloodstained sledgehammer.

The film ends with a series of interviews of Charles Manson and the attackers.

== Cast ==
- Katie Cassidy as Sharon Tate
- Elizabeth Henstridge as Abigail Folger
- Adam Campbell as Wojciech Frykowski
- Miles Fisher as Jay Sebring
- Spencer Daniels as William Garretson
- Lucas Adams as Steven Parent
- Chris Mulkey as John
- Jane Kaczmarek as Mary
- Eric Ladin as Detective Clarkin, a role Ladin reprises from Annabelle
- Arlen Escarpeta as Officer

== Production ==
=== Development ===
On May 8, 2015, John R. Leonetti was announced as the director of Wolves at the Door for New Line Cinema, with Gary Dauberman as screenwriter and Peter Safran as producer. The script was loosely based on the Manson Family murders in 1969. Known as the Tate murders, the event saw members of the Charles Manson cult break into the home of Sharon Tate, eight-and-a-half months pregnant, and her new husband director Roman Polanski. The director was shooting in Europe at the time, but Tate was entertaining three friends. They were all stabbed and shot multiple times. The project was described as "a home invasion thriller set in the 1960s but is not a retelling of the actual events, nor will it reference any Manson connection."

=== Casting ===
Casting was announced in May 2015, with Katie Cassidy playing the lead role of Sharon, alongside Miles Fisher as Jay, Elizabeth Henstridge as Abigail, and Adam Campbell as Wojciech.

=== Filming ===
Principal photography lasted from mid-May through late-June in Los Angeles in 2015.

=== Music ===
On September 18, 2015, Toby Chu was announced to be to scoring the soundtrack for Wolves at the Door. Chu had previously collaborated with Leonetti in Annabelle (2014).

== Release ==
Wolves at the Door first opened theatrically in India on October 21, 2016. The film's first trailer was released on October 18, 2016. It was followed by a limited release in Germany on March 2, 2017, and in the United Kingdom on March 17, 2017. The film did not receive a theatrical release in the United States, but was eventually released on Digital HD by Warner Bros. Home Entertainment on April 17, 2017. It was rated R by the Motion Picture Association of America for "violence, terror and some language".

== Reception ==
On the review aggregator website Rotten Tomatoes, 0% of seven critics' reviews are positive, with an average rating of 3.3/10.

Geoffrey McNab of The Independent called the film a "repellent, misconceived, and pointless film", awarding one out of five stars. Matthew Turner of The List also gave the film one star, calling it "a deeply distasteful mess".

Terry Staunton of Radio Times criticized the film's tension and remarked that "Cassidy and co are portrayed as such irritating "beautiful people" that some may find themselves reluctant to root for them." Mark Kermode of The Guardian listed it as #1 on his list of "The Ten Worst Movies Of 2017 So Far", calling it "nasty, duplicitous, morally bankrupt and dramatically inept... and I hope to never have to mention or think about it ever again." He later called it the worst film of the year, saying it is "a repellently exploitative entry in the already sordid “Manson movies” canon." Kermode has recently listed it as #5 in the "Worst Films of the Decade" on Episode 64 of his "Kermode on Film" podcast.
