= Robert Steven Kaplan =

American economist and banker

Robert Kaplan

13th President of the Federal Reserve Bank of Dallas
- In office September 8, 2015 – October 8, 2021
- Preceded by: Richard W. Fisher
- Succeeded by: Meredith Black (Acting)

Personal details
- Born: July 1957 (age 69) Prairie Village, Kansas, U.S.
- Education: University of Kansas, Lawrence (BS); Harvard University (MBA)

Robert Steven Kaplan (born 1957) is an American economist and banker who currently serves as the vice chairman of Goldman Sachs. Before that he served as the chief executive officer and president of the Federal Reserve Bank of Dallas from 2015 until 2021.

Joining the Dallas Fed, Kaplan was a faculty member and senior associate dean at the Harvard Business School.

Kaplan is an active venture philanthropist through his work as co-chairman of the Draper Richards Kaplan Foundation. He serves as chairman of Project ALS, and is a board member of Harvard Medical School.

He is the author of three books on business leadership: What You Really Need To Lead, What You're Really Meant To Do, and What To Ask The Person In The Mirror.

== Early life and education ==
Kaplan was born and raised in Prairie Village, Kansas, and is a graduate of the University of Kansas in 1979 and Harvard Business School in 1983. He lives with his two sons in Dallas, Texas.

Kaplan is the chairman of Project A.L.S. and co-chairman of the Draper Richards Kaplan Foundation. He is also a member of the Advisory Council of the George W. Bush Institute, an Advisory Board Member of the Baker Institute, as well as a board member of Harvard Medical School, St. Mark's School of Texas and the Co-Founding Board Chair Emeritus of the TEAK Fellowship.

== Career ==
Kaplan was vice chairman of the Goldman Sachs Group, Inc. He became a partner in 1990. He served as head of the Corporate Finance Department, head of Asia Pacific Investment Banking and head of the high-yield department in Investment Banking. He was a member of the management committee and was co-chairman of the partnership committee.

Throughout his 23-year tenure at Goldman Sachs, Kaplan served in various leadership roles including head of Corporate Finance, head of Asia-Pacific Investment Banking, head of the high-yield department in Investment Banking, member of the Management Committee and co-chairman of the Partnership Committee.

In 2006, Kaplan joined the faculty of the Harvard Business School, as a Senior Associate Dean and the Martin Marshall Professor of Management Practice.

In August 2015, Kaplan was named to head the Federal Reserve Bank of Dallas and represented the Eleventh Federal Reserve District on the Federal Open Market Committee, effective September 2015. In this role he managed the 1,200 employees of the Dallas Fed office.

In early September 2021, a financial disclosure form showed that Kaplan conducted million-dollar trades of individual stocks, including Apple, Amazon and Delta Air Lines and owned 32 individual stocks with 27 having a value of over $1 million, including those of five fossil-fuel companies. Kaplan's trading activities received widespread criticism for undermining confidence in the Federal Reserve. All transactions occurred outside of the Federal Reserve's financial blackout period and were approved by the bank's compliance department. Sen. Elizabeth Warren has called on all Federal Reserve presidents to have a ban on the trading and ownership of individual stocks by regional senior officials. Due to the ethics concerns, Kaplan said he would sell his individual stocks.

On September 27, 2021, Kaplan announced he would be retiring early from his position as the president of the Federal Reserve Bank of Dallas, citing distractions over his stock market trades. His retirement took effect on October 8, 2021.

On January 22, 2024, The Federal Reserve Inspector General cleared Kaplan in their probe of 2020 trades concluding that the trades were allowed under the Fed's rules and didn't violate central bank policies or the law.

In May 2024 it was announced that Kaplan would return to work at Goldman Sachs as a Vice Chairman, a role in which he would provide advice to Wall Street clients across global banking and markets, and asset and wealth management.

Kaplan was also co-founder and chairman of Indaba Capital Management, LP, was chairman of the Investment Advisory Committee at Google, a trustee at the Ford Foundation and has served on the boards of Harvard Management Company, Bed Bath & Beyond, State Street Corporation and Heidrick & Struggles International.

== Bibliography ==
=== Books ===
- Kaplan, Robert Steven. What You Really Need to Lead: The Power of Thinking and Acting Like an Owner. Boston, MA, USA: Harvard Business Review Press, September 2015.
- Kaplan, Robert Steven. What You're Really Meant To Do: A Road Map for Reaching Your Unique Potential. Boston, MA, USA: Harvard Business Review Press, 2013.
- Kaplan, Robert Steven. What to Ask the Person in the Mirror: Critical Questions for Becoming a More Effective Leader and Reaching Your Potential. Boston: Harvard Business Review Press, 2011.

=== Journal articles ===
- Neeley, Tsedal, and Robert Steven Kaplan. "What's Your Language Strategy? It Should Bind Your Company's Global Talent Management and Vision." R1409D. Harvard Business Review 92, no. 9 (September 2014): 70–76.
- Kaplan, Robert Steven. "Top Executives Need Feedback: Here's How They Can Get It." McKinsey Quarterly, no. 4 (2011): 60–71.
- Kaplan, Robert Steven. "Reaching Your Potential." HBS Centennial Issue Harvard Business Review 86, nos. 7/8 (July–August 2008): 45–49.
- Kaplan, Robert Steven. "What to Ask the Person in the Mirror." Harvard Business Review 85, no. 1 (January 2007).

Other offices
Preceded by Richard W. Fisher	President of the Federal Reserve Bank of Dallas; 2015–2021	Succeeded by Lorie K. Logan
