= Federal Reserve Bank of Dallas San Antonio Branch =

Coordinates: 29.4190°N 98.4931°W

The Federal Reserve Bank of Dallas San Antonio Branch is one of three branches of the Federal Reserve Bank of Dallas. The branch is located at 402 Dwyer, San Antonio, Texas.

== Current Board of Directors ==
The following people are on the board of directors as of 2013:

=== Appointed by the Federal Reserve Bank ===
Appointed by the Federal Reserve Bank
Name	Title	Term Expires
Josue Robles	Former President and Chief Executive Officer; USAA; San Antonio, Texas	2013
Ygnacio D. Garza	CPA; Long Chilton LLP; Brownsville, Texas	2014
Janie Barrera	President and Chief Executive Officer; ACCION Texas, Inc. San Antonio, Texas	2014
Manoj Saxena	General Manager, IBM Software Group; IBM; Austin, Texas	2015

=== Appointed by the Board of Governors ===
Appointed by the Board of Governors
Name	Title	Term Expires
Curtis V. Anastasio	President & Chief Executive Officer; NuStar Energy L.P. San Antonio, Texas	2013
Thomas E. Dobson (Chair)	Chairman and Chief Executive Officer; Whataburger Restaurants, LP; San Antonio, Texas	2014
Catherine M. Burzik	President and Chief Executive Officer; Kinetic Concepts, Inc. San Antonio, Texas	2015

== See also ==
- Federal Reserve Act
- Federal Reserve System
- Federal Reserve Bank
- Federal Reserve Districts
- Federal Reserve Branches
- Structure of the Federal Reserve System
- Federal Reserve Bank of Dallas
- Federal Reserve Bank of Dallas El Paso Branch
- Federal Reserve Bank of Dallas Houston Branch
