= Cindy Ramos-Davidson =

- Born: December 31, 1955; St. Louis, Missouri, US
- Died: June 1, 2025 (aged 69); El Paso, Texas, US
- Education: University of Texas at El Paso
- Occupation: Business executive
- Employer: El Paso Hispanic Chamber of Commerce
- Awards: National Chief Executive of the Year, United States Hispanic Chamber of Commerce (2008–2010)

Cindy Ramos-Davidson (December 31, 1955 - June 1, 2025) was an American business leader based in El Paso, Texas. She was the CEO of the El Paso Hispanic Chamber of Commerce.

== Early life and education ==
Ramos-Davidson was the last baby born in St. Louis on New Year's Eve in 1955. She and her family moved to El Paso, Texas, moved briefly to other cities in the southwest and finally settled in El Paso permanently in 1990. She graduated from Bel Air High School and the University of Texas at El Paso (UTEP).

== Career ==
In 1995, she was part of the group that set up access to the Internet using the El Paso Business Information Center at the Greater El Paso Chamber of Commerce. She became the new CEO of the El Paso Hispanic Chamber of Commerce (EPHCC) in 2000.

In 2009, Ramos-Davidson was one of the honorees at the United States Hispanic Chamber of Commerce (USHCC) at their 30th annual convention. At the event, she was recognized for the second time as the USHCC National Chief Executive of the Year. She received this award three years in a row between 2008 and 2010. She also served on the board of the Federal Reserve Bank of Dallas.

== Personal life and death ==
In April 2025, Ramos-Davidson left EPHCC as CEO for health reasons. She was diagnosed with pancreatic cancer. Ramos-Davidson died on June 1, 2025 in El Paso.
