= Adam Campbell (actor) =

English actor (born 1980)

- Born: Adam Jones; 19 August 1980 (age 46); Bath, Somerset, England
- Occupation: Actor
- Years active: 2004–present
- Spouse: Jayma Mays (m. 2007)
- Children: 1

Adam Campbell (born Adam Jones; 19 August 1980) is an English actor. He has appeared in films, such as Date Movie (2006), Epic Movie (2007), and Wolves at the Door (2016). He played the role of Cal Vandeusen in the horror miniseries Harper's Island (2009). Campbell also appeared as Greg Walsh in the sitcom Great News (2017), and as young Donald Mallard on episodes of NCIS (2014–16, 2020, 2026) and NCIS: Origins.

== Career ==
Campbell was first cast in Commando Nanny, an unaired sitcom for The WB, which was originally scheduled to premiere in 2004. He subsequently starred as Grant Fockyerdoder with Alyson Hannigan in the 2006 parody of romantic comedy films, Date Movie, which was a mild success at the American box office. He also starred in You Are Here, an independent film about a group of twenty-somethings, released in 2007. One of his biggest roles was in Epic Movie where he played a lead, Peter Pervertski. Campbell starred in the CBS mini-series Harper's Island as Cal Vandeusen.

In January 2010, Campbell was cast as the voice of Ringo Starr for the cancelled 3D remake of Yellow Submarine.

In 2015, Campbell appeared in the Emmy-nominated Netflix comedy series Unbreakable Kimmy Schmidt as Logan Beekman, the upper class 'Daddy's Boy' boyfriend of the title character, played by Ellie Kemper.

Between 2017 and 2018, Campbell played Greg Walsh in the NBC sitcom Great News. His character is an executive producer at The Breakdown and main character Katie's boss and love interest.

== Personal life ==
In 2006, Campbell met his wife, American actress and singer Jayma Mays, on the set of the film Epic Movie. They married on 28 October 2007. The couple have one son who was born in August 2016.

== Filmography ==
=== Film ===
Year	Title	Role	Notes
2006	Making a Spoof	Peter Jackson	Television film
2006	Date Movie	Grant Funkyerdoder	
2006	Pop Star	Andy McTeer	Short film
2007	Epic Movie	Peter Pervertski	
2007	Spin	Mick	
2007	Hell on Wheels	Dan	Short film
2012	The Five-Year Engagement	Gideon	
2016	Wolves at the Door	Wojciech Frykowski	

=== Television ===
Year	Title	Role	Notes
2004	Expeditions to the Edge		Episode: "Sahara"
2009	Harper's Island	Cal Vandeusen	9 episodes
2011	Off the Map	Brian	Episode: "Smile. Don't Kill Anyone."
2011	Up All Night	Trent	Episode: "Cool Neighbors"
2011	Parenthood	Arty Party	Episode: "Sore Loser"
2012	Best Friends Forever	Ken Haskins	Episode: "Hey Nonny Nonny"
2013	Wedding Band	Deke Brad	Episode: "Personal Universe"
2013	Touch	Tony Rigby	4 episodes
2013	2 Broke Girls	Graham	Episode: "And Just Plane Magic"
2014	Mixology	Ron	13 episodes
2014–26	NCIS	Ducky Mallard	5 episodes
2015	Unbreakable Kimmy Schmidt	Logan Beekman	4 episodes
2015	The Comedians	Connor Tate	Episode: "Misdirection"
2016	Dice	Brad Stevens	Episode: "Sal Maldonado"
2017–18	Great News	Greg Walsh	23 episodes
2018	Trial & Error	Dr. Shinewell	2 episodes
2018	Speechless	Rowen	Episode: "L-O-N LONDON, Part 2"
2025–26	NCIS: Origins	Ducky Mallard	3 episodes

=== Web ===
Year	Title	Role	Notes
2011	Marcy	Adam	Episode: "Marcy Does a Picnic"

=== Music videos ===
Year	Title	Artist
2007	"Awakening"	Switchfoot
2007	"Love Song"	Sara Bareilles
