= Date Movie =

2006 American romantic parody film

- Theatrical release poster
- Directed by: Aaron Seltzer
- Written by: Jason Friedberg; Aaron Seltzer
- Produced by: Paul Schiff; Jason Friedberg
- Starring: Alyson Hannigan; Adam Campbell; Jennifer Coolidge; Tony Cox; Fred Willard; Eddie Griffin
- Cinematography: Shawn Maurer
- Edited by: Paul Hirsch
- Music by: David Kitay
- Production companies: Regency Enterprises; New Regency
- Distributed by: 20th Century Fox
- Release date: February 17, 2006
- Running time: 83 minutes
- Country: United States
- Language: English
- Budget: $20 million
- Box office: $84.8 million

Date Movie is a 2006 American romantic comedy parody film written by Jason Friedberg and Aaron Seltzer, directed by Seltzer, and produced by Paul Schiff and Friedberg. It stars Alyson Hannigan, Adam Campbell, Sophie Monk, Tony Cox, Jennifer Coolidge, Eddie Griffin, and Fred Willard. It is a parody of the romantic comedy film genre, and mostly references My Big Fat Greek Wedding, Meet the Fockers, Hitch, Legally Blonde, and Bridget Jones's Diary.

It was released on February 17, 2006, by 20th Century Fox. The film was panned by critics who criticized its gross-out humor and pop-culture references. It has since been referred to as one of the worst movies ever made. It was a commercial success, grossing $84.8 million on a $20 million budget.

== Plot ==
Obese Julia Jones dreams of marrying Napoleon Dynamite, but even in her dreams, she is rejected. Writing in her diary, she thinks she will never find her true love. Julia goes outside and dances to impress men on the streets, but is unsuccessful.

At Julia's father Frank's Greek diner, she meets and is instantly attracted to Grant Funkyerdoder. (Note: "Fockyerdoder" in the unrated version) When Frank barks an order at her, she turns to respond and accidentally hits Grant over the head with a coffee pot, knocking him to the floor. She turns around, finds his table suddenly empty, and assumes he ran away.

Julia seeks help from love therapist Hitch, who initially rejects her but finally relents. He takes her to a garage, where she gets "pimped out" and made slimmer. She earns a spot on a reality television dating show called The Extreme Bachelor: Desperate Edition, where the bachelor turns out to be Grant. Host Ty Andrews introduces him, who greets all the women and is asked to eliminate the losers, which he does by shooting them one by one.

As the last woman standing, Julia is rewarded with dinner for two at "A Restaurant". After their meal, Julia and Grant venture to her apartment, where they have sex. Later, Grant takes Julia to Tiffany & Co., where the salespeople reveal that she may pick whatever she wants. He then declares he loves her and proposes, and she happily accepts. The couple then meets with Grant's parents, Bernie and Roz, who recommend a wedding planner, after which Roz reveals that Grant lost his virginity to the housekeeper, Eduardo.

Julia and Grant visit the overzealous wedding planner, Jell-O, and suggest to her that they would like a traditional, elegant wedding. Jell-O instead insists they pick a fast food restaurant called Taco Butt as their venue, which Julia declines. Annoyed, Jell-O angrily tells them that it's the best she can do on short notice. Grant tries to ease the awkward situation by telling them he has already chosen a best man. Jell-O's mood changes and excitedly reveals that she will also be the wedding entertainment by slamming her desk over with her massive butt and aggressively ripping off her navy blue suit to reveal a gold spandex bra and tights. Julia and Grant are shocked as she shows off her provocative dance moves, and then they scream in fear as she joyfully backs up towards them.

Grant introduces Julia to his "best man", a seductive woman named Andy, his ex-fiancée. Andy seemingly harbors no resentment towards Julia for marrying Grant, and even helps Julia shop for her wedding dress. However, at the bridal shop, Julia hits her head on a power box and suddenly can read people's thoughts. Reading Andy's mind, she realises Andy wants to get back together with Grant and plans to split them up. The women fight each other, Kill Bill-style.

On her wedding day, Julia arrives late, and witnesses Grant and Andy sharing a kiss, although she is unaware that Grant tried to reject Andy. Heartbroken and unable to forgive Grant, she agrees to marry her father's choice, Nicky.

Once at the altar with Nicky, Julia is regretting her decision and having flashbacks about her and Grant. Frank objects to the union, realizing he was wrong about Grant, who liked Julia even before the makeover. He persuades her to go after Grant, who is revealed to have waited for her on top of her apartment building for 6 months. Julia hurries to meet him as he is leaving, while shoving aside Andy who was pursuing him too.

Julia arrives too late and falls off the roof, but is conveniently caught by Grant. They reconcile and marry, officiated by Hitch, who is now dating Jell-O. Andy and Nicky meet at the wedding and make out. Meanwhile, Grant and Julia leave in a horse and carriage. Bernie and Roz gifts Julia a vaginal thermometer, which apparently has been in their family for generations and is regarded as good luck when kept unwashed.

On their honeymoon, Grant and Julia go to Kong Island and film a woman, Anne, tied between two poles. After King Kong rips off her dress and gropes her, she says "I like hairy boys", before King Kong flattens her.

== Cast ==
- Alyson Hannigan as Julia Jones
- Adam Campbell as Grant Funkyerdoder
- Jennifer Coolidge as Roz Funkyerdoder
- Tony Cox as Hitch
- Lil Jon as Himself
- Carmen Electra as Anne
- Fred Willard as Bernie Funkyerdoder
- Eddie Griffin as Frank Jones
- Sophie Monk as Andy
- Marie Matiko as Betty Jones
- Judah Friedlander as Nicky
- Josh Meyers as:
  - Napoleon Dynamite
  - Owen Wilson from Wedding Crashers
- Meera Simhan as Linda Jones
- Valery Ortiz as Jell-O
- Mauricio Sanchez as Eduardo
- Frank Welker as Jinxers the cat (Uncredited)
- Beverly Polcyn as Old Cat Woman
- Scott Speedman as Ty Andrews
- Jack Cortes as Danny Ricks
- Tom Fitzpatrick as Gandalf
- Tom Lenk as Frodo
- Edward Moss as Michael Jackson (Moss reprises his role from Scary Movie 3)
- Nadia Dina Ariqat as Britney Spears
- Nick Steele as Kevin Federline
- Jasen Salvatore as Ben Stiller
- Bridget Ann Brno as Bridget Jones

== Works parodied ==
=== Films and TV shows ===
- My Big Fat Greek Wedding (2002) (main parody)
- Meet the Parents (2000) and Meet the Fockers (2004) (main parody)
- Bridget Jones's Diary (2001)
- Hitch (2005)
- The Wedding Planner (2001)
- Kill Bill (2003)
- The Lord of the Rings trilogy (2001–2003)
- Mr. & Mrs. Smith (2005)
- When Harry Met Sally... (1989)
- Along Came Polly (2004)
- King Kong (2005)
- Pimp My Ride (2004–2006)
- The 40-Year-Old Virgin (2005)
- Sleepless in Seattle (1993)
- My Best Friend's Wedding (1997)
- Bend It Like Beckham (2002)
- Napoleon Dynamite (2004)
- Sweet Home Alabama (2002)
- Pretty Woman (1990)
- Say Anything... (1989)
- Dodgeball: A True Underdog Story (2004)
- Star Wars: Episode III – Revenge of the Sith (2005)
- The Bachelor (2002–present)
- What Women Want (2000)
- How to Lose a Guy in 10 Days (2003)
- Legally Blonde (2001)

=== Real-life people ===
- Jennifer Lopez
- Paris Hilton
- Britney Spears
- Kevin Federline
- Barbra Streisand
- Michael Jackson
- Ben Stiller

== Production ==
Aaron Seltzer and Jason Friedberg sold an untitled romantic comedy pitch to Regency Enterprises and became attached to helm it. In June 2005, it was announced Alyson Hannigan and Adam Campbell were to star in the film.

== Release ==
=== Box office ===
The film grossed $48,548,426 in the United States and $36,247,230 internationally, adding up to a worldwide gross of $84,795,656.

=== Critical response ===
The film did not have advance press screenings. On the review aggregator website Rotten Tomatoes, 7% of 88 critics' reviews are positive, with an average rating of 2.9/10. The website's consensus reads: "In an attempt to parody rom-com cliches, Date Movie ultimately makes a mockery of itself, with juvenile toilet humor and empty pop culture references." The site ranked the film 77th in the 100 worst reviewed films of the 2000s. Metacritic, which uses a weighted average, assigned the film a score of 11 out of 100, based on 18 critics, indicating "overwhelming dislike". Audiences surveyed by CinemaScore gave the film an average grade of "C+" on an A+ to F scale.

Owen Gleiberman of Entertainment Weekly awarded the film a B− grade, and compared it to fast food. Variety praised Jennifer Coolidge for providing a few bright moments with a spot-on spoof of Barbra Streisand, but was otherwise unimpressed, describing the film as "padded and repetitious".

Critic Scott Tobias of The A.V. Club was amazed that a "joke-a-second comedy" failed to contain a single laugh.

Pete Vonder Haar of Film Threat described the film as a contender for the worst of 2006. He walked out of the film after 29 minutes without a single laugh and said he did not feel any guilt about it. He described the laughter of others in the audience as "inexplicable" and wondered if U.S. cinema-going audiences were made up of "deranged howler monkeys".

=== Accolades ===
Carmen Electra won the Golden Raspberry Award for Worst Supporting Actress for her performance in this film and Scary Movie 4. At the 2006 Stinkers Bad Movie Awards, Jennifer Coolidge was nominated for Most Annoying Fake Female Accent, but she lost to Cindy Cheung for Lady in the Water. However, the film won the awards for Worst Screenplay and Most Painfully Unfunny Comedy.

== Home media ==
Date Movie was released on DVD on May 30, 2006, in rated (83 minutes) and unrated (84 minutes) versions, by 20th Century Fox Home Entertainment. 1,051,878 units were sold, bringing in $18,777,508 in revenue.

== Soundtrack ==
Date Movie Soundtrack

Soundtrack album by various
- Released: February 17, 2006
- Recorded: Various times
- Genres: R&B, hip hop
- Label: Lakeshore Records

Track listing

1. "Milkshake" – Kelis
2. "Party Hard" – The Perceptionists
3. "You’re the First, the Last, My Everything" – Barry White
4. "Toma" – Pitbull feat. Lil Jon
5. "Funhop" – Todd Schietroma
6. "Do You Believe in Magic" – The Lovin' Spoonful
7. "Too Much Booty (In da Pants)" – Soundmaster T
8. "Break it on Down" – Flii Stylz & Tenashus
9. "Baby Come Back" – Player (Edit)
10. "The Price Is Right (Theme)" – David Kitay
11. "Break It Down" – Alana D.
12. "Come on Shake" – Classic
13. "What Will You Do?" – Sparklemotion
14. "Don't Cha" – Pussycat Dolls
