= Toby Chu =

American composer

- Education: Berklee College of Music
- Musical career
- Genres: Film and television scores, classical, rock, electronic
- Occupation: Composer
- Instruments: Piano, keyboards, guitar
- Years active: 2000–present
- Website: www.tobychumusic.com

Toby Chu is an American film and television composer and artist of Chinese descent. He wrote the score to Pixar's Oscar-winning animated short Bao. Recent and notable scores include Apple TV+'s Stillwater (composed with Kishi Bashi), CBS's True Lies and the Netflix Animation film The Monkey King.

== Early life ==
Chu is an American of Chinese descent. At an early age, Chu took guitar and piano lessons.

== Education ==
In 1999, Chu earned a degree in film scoring from Berklee College of Music.

== Career ==
Chu's works include Legends of Oz: Dorothy's Return, Surf's Up 2: WaveMania for Sony Pictures Animation, Warner Bros.’ dramatic thriller Unforgettable, and New Line Cinema’s period thriller Wolves at the Door. He also scored Bron Studios' Henchmen, NBC’s The Brave, and the Freeform original series Beyond.

Chu’s previous scoring credits include Covert Affairs, Burn Notice, State of Affairs, and The Riches. Before embarking on solo projects, Chu worked with the Grammy-nominated composer Harry Gregson-Williams for over a decade.

Chu collaborated with Daft Punk, arranging and orchestrating "Adagio for Tron" on the Tron: Legacy soundtrack. He has also been credited for musical contributions to Man on Fire, Déjà Vu, The Chronicles of Narnia: The Lion, the Witch and the Wardrobe, Domino, and Team America: World Police.

== Filmography ==
=== Films ===
- 2006 Solace - Short film. composer.
- 2007 Last Exit - Short film. Composer.
- 2013 Legends of Oz: Dorothy's Return - composer.
- 2016 Wolves at the Door - composer.
- 2016 Indiscretion - composer.
- 2016 Surf's Up 2: WaveMania - composer.
- 2017 Unforgettable - composer.
- 2018 Bao - Short film. Composer.
- 2018 Henchmen - composer.
- 2021 Fistful of Vengeance - composer.
- 2023 The Monkey King

=== Television ===
- 2004-2005 Father of the Pride - composer.
- 2007-2013 Burn Notice - composer (2012-2013 Season 6).
- 2010-2014 Covert Affairs - composer.
- 2014-2015 State of Affairs - composer.
- 2017-2018 The Brave - composer.
- 2020 Stillwater - composer (with Kishi Bashi).
- 2021 Centaurworld - composer
- 2023 True Lies - composer

=== Video Games ===
- 2023 Call of Duty: Modern Warfare II (Season 4) - composer
