= Federal Reserve Bank of Dallas Houston Branch =

One of three branches of the Federal Reserve Bank of Dallas

Coordinates: 29°45′36″N 95°23′04″W

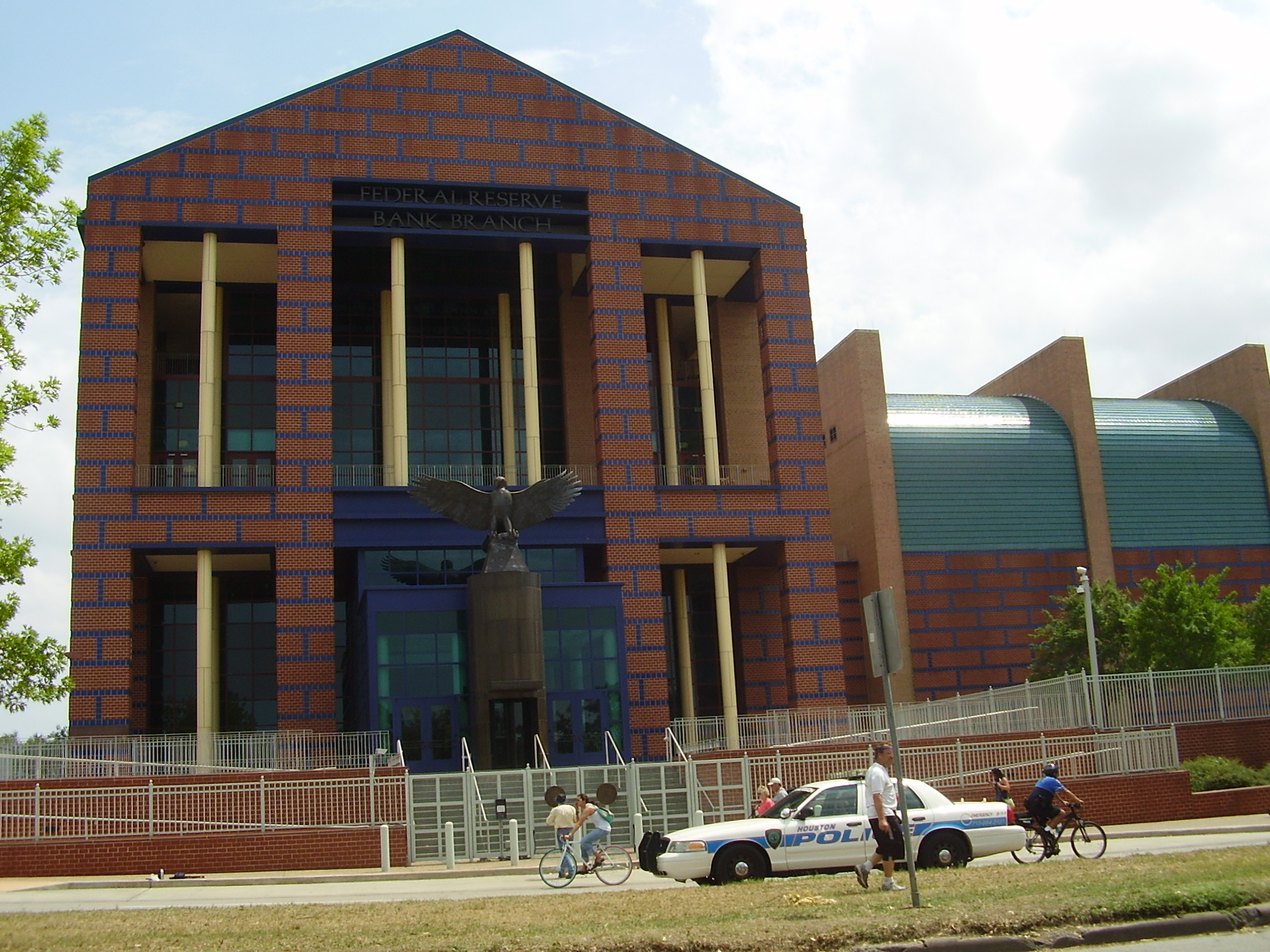
Federal Reserve Bank of Dallas Houston Branch

The Reserve Bank of Dallas Houston Branch is one of three branches of the Federal Reserve Bank of Dallas. The branch is located on Allen Parkway in the Fourth Ward of Houston, Texas. The 297,000-square-foot (27,600 m^{2}) building, which includes the second largest currency vault in the country, was designed by architect Michael Graves.

== Structure ==
The building's architect Michael Graves said the inspiration for the structure was the Southwestern landscape. Musician and Talking Heads leader David Byrne, commented that "This very out of place structure somehow lingers, like a fart left by someone no longer in an elevator." The brick exterior, which consists of 537,000 closure brick, 31,400 blue structural glazed tile, and 90,000 modular accent brick has been called a masonry masterpiece by the Mason Contractors Association of America.

== Board of directors ==
The following people are on the board of directors as of 2013:

=== Appointed by the Federal Reserve Bank ===
Appointed by the Federal Reserve Bank
Name	Title	Term Expires
Gerald B. Smith	Chairman and Chief Executive Officer; Smith, Graham & Company Investment Advisors, L.P. Houston, Texas	2013
Kirk S. Hachigian	Chairman and Chief Executive Officer; Cooper Industries, Ltd. Houston, Texas	2014
Vacancy		2014
Paul B. Murphy Jr.	President and Chief Executive Officer; Cadence Bank; Houston, Texas	2015

=== Appointed by the Board of Governors ===
Appointed by the Board of Governors
Name	Title	Term Expires
Greg L. Armstrong	President and Chief Executive Officer; Plains All American Pipeline L.P. Houston, Texas	2013
Paul W. Hobby (Chair)	Chairman and Managing Partner; Genesis Park, LP; Houston, Texas	2014
Ellen Ochoa	Deputy Director; NASA Johnson Space Center; Houston, Texas	2015

== See also ==
- Federal Reserve Act
- Federal Reserve System
- Federal Reserve Bank
- Federal Reserve Districts
- Federal Reserve Branches
- Structure of the Federal Reserve System
- Federal Reserve Bank of Dallas
- Federal Reserve Bank of Dallas El Paso Branch
- Federal Reserve Bank of Dallas San Antonio Branch
