= Lorie K. Logan =

14th President of the Federal Reserve Bank of Dallas

Lorie Logan

14th President of the Federal Reserve Bank of Dallas
- Incumbent
- Assumed office August 22, 2022
- Preceded by: Meredith Black (Acting)

Personal details
- Born: 1972 or 1973 (age 53–54) Versailles, Kentucky, U.S.
- Education: Davidson College (BA); Columbia University (MPA)

Lorie K. Logan (born 1972/1973) is president and CEO of the Federal Reserve Bank of Dallas.

== Biography ==
Logan is a native of Versailles, Kentucky, and holds a bachelor's degree in political science from Davidson College and a master's degree in public administration from Columbia University.

Logan became deputy manager of the System Open Market Account at the Federal Reserve Bank of New York in 2014. She served as manager pro tem in 2019 and became manager on January 1, 2020, with responsibility for implementing monetary policy under Federal Open Market Committee directives. She joined the Federal Reserve Bank of New York in 1999 as a financial analyst and played a key role in implementing the central bank's emergency programs during the COVID-19 pandemic.

She was named the president and CEO of the Federal Reserve Bank of Dallas on May 11, 2022, and is the first woman to hold the role in a permanent capacity.

Other offices
Preceded by Meredith Black; Acting	President of the Federal Reserve Bank of Dallas; 2022–present	Incumbent
