= Richard W. Fisher =

American politician

Richard Fisher
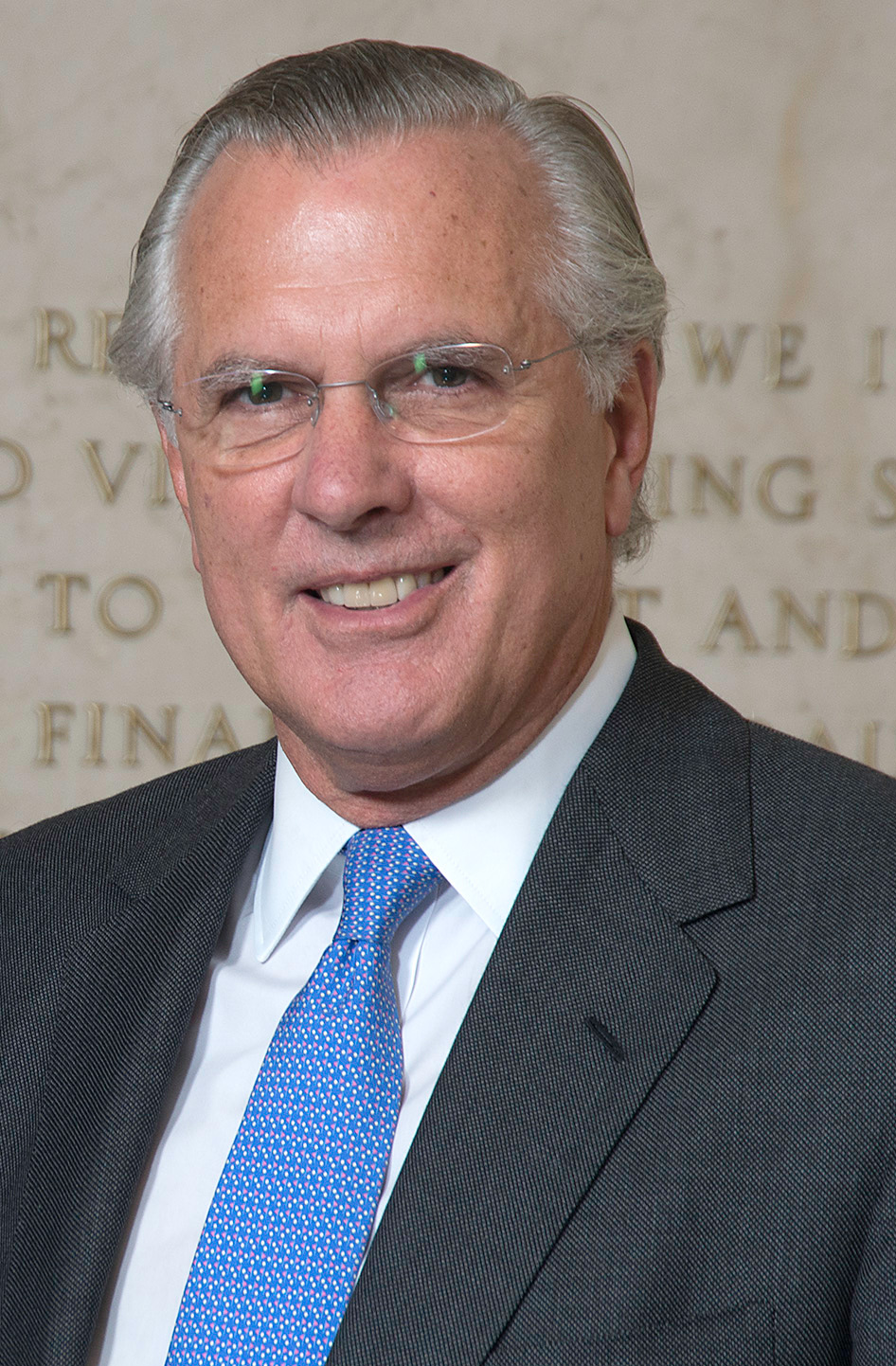
- Fisher in 2014

12th President of the Federal Reserve Bank of Dallas
- In office April 4, 2005 – March 19, 2015
- Preceded by: Helen Holcomb (Acting)
- Succeeded by: Helen Holcomb (Acting); Robert Steven Kaplan (permanent)

Personal details
- Born: 1949 (age 76–77) Los Angeles, California, U.S.
- Party: Democratic
- Spouse(s): Nancy Miles Collins (divorced); Missy Bailey (2017–present)
- Children: 4, including Miles
- Education: Harvard University (BA); Hertford College, Oxford; Stanford University (MBA)

Richard Welton Fisher (born 1949) is the former president and CEO of the Federal Reserve Bank of Dallas, having served in that post from April 2005 to 2015. He is a former senior advisor to Barclays Plc, a British bank holding company, a director of PepsiCo, and a senior contributing editor for CNBC. From 2011 to 2017, he served on the Harvard Board of Overseers.

== Early life and education ==
A first-generation American, Fisher was born in Los Angeles, but grew up in Mexico. His father was Australian, while his mother was South African, of Norwegian descent. Following graduation from Admiral Farragut Academy in Toms River, New Jersey, he attended the United States Naval Academy in Annapolis, Maryland from 1967 to 1969, before transferring to Harvard University, where he earned a bachelor's degree in economics in 1971. From 1972 to 1973, he studied Latin American studies at Hertford College, Oxford. Completing his education in 1975, he earned an M.B.A. from the Graduate School of Business at Stanford University.

== Career ==
Moving to New York City, Fisher joined the Wall Street investment bank Brown Brothers, Harriman and Company, where he was assistant to former Undersecretary of the Treasury Robert Roosa, specializing in fixed income and foreign exchange markets. From 1978 to 1979, he served as Special Assistant to Secretary W. Michael Blumenthal at the United States Department of the Treasury, where he worked on issues relating to the dollar crisis. Returning to Brown Brothers, he established and managed the bank's Dallas-based Texas operations.

Leaving Brown Brothers in 1987, Fisher created Fisher Capital Management, and a separate funds-management firm, Fisher Ewing Partners, managing both firms until 1997. In 1993, he was a candidate in the special election for the U.S. Senate seat in Texas, which was vacated by Lloyd Bentsen when the latter became U.S. Secretary of the Treasury, but took fifth place in a 21 candidate field behind State Treasurer Kay Bailey Hutchison, U.S. Senator Bob Krueger, U.S. Congressman Joe Barton, and U.S. Congressman Jack Fields.

The following year, Fisher was a candidate for the same U.S. Senate seat in the regularly scheduled election. Fisher came in second to former Texas Attorney General Jim Mattox in the Democratic Party primary, but won the ensuing run-off election. Fisher lost the general election in a landslide to incumbent Republican Kay Bailey Hutchison having been defeated 61% to 38%.

From 1997 to 2001, Fisher served as Deputy U.S. Trade Representative, serving under U.S. Trade Representative Charlene Barshefsky, where he was responsible for the implementation of NAFTA, and negotiating a variety of trade agreements, including the bilateral accords admitting both the People's Republic of China and Taiwan to the World Trade Organization. From 2001 to 2005, he served as Vice Chairman of Kissinger McLarty Associates, a strategic advisory firm headed by former U.S. Secretary of State Henry Kissinger and former White House Chief of Staff Mack McLarty. He left the firm in April, 2005, when he was appointed as President of the Federal Reserve Bank of Dallas serving in that post until 2015.

Transcripts of the Federal Open Market Committee in May 2007 showed Fisher sounded the alarm on the housing crisis even as many of his peers on the Committee expressed doubts: "On the housing front, I have been bearish—more bearish than anybody at this table. I am more concerned than I was before. We can go through the numbers, but I think it is best expressed by the CEO of one of the five big builders, who said that in March he was arguing internally with his board that the headlines were worse than reality and now reality is worse than the headlines."

At the Dallas Fed in 2013, Fisher was outspoken in opposition to the way quantitative easing was being pursued by Fed chair Ben Bernanke and the board.

As U.S. equity markets began to unravel barely two weeks after Treasury Secretary Janet Yellen's December 18 rate hike announcement, Fisher came out on CNBC decrying the Federal Open Market Committee's decision to launch QE3 saying that he, "voted against doing QE3" and that QE3 was, "one step too far." Fisher is also a member of Washington D.C.–based think tank the Inter-American Dialogue.

In April 2020, Governor Greg Abbott named Fisher to the Strike Force to Open Texas—a group "tasked with finding safe and effective ways to slowly reopen the state" amid the COVID-19 pandemic in Texas.

== Personal life ==
Fisher is divorced from Nancy Miles Collins, the daughter of former U.S. Congressman James M. Collins. They have four children, including their son, actor Miles Fisher. He married Missy Bailey in July 2017.

Party political offices
Preceded by Bob Krueger	Democratic nominee for U.S. Senator from Texas (Class 1); 1994	Succeeded by Gene Kelly
Other offices
Preceded by Robert D. McTeer	President of the Federal Reserve Bank of Dallas; 2005–2015	Succeeded by Robert Steven Kaplan
