= Robert D. McTeer =

American economist

Robert McTeer
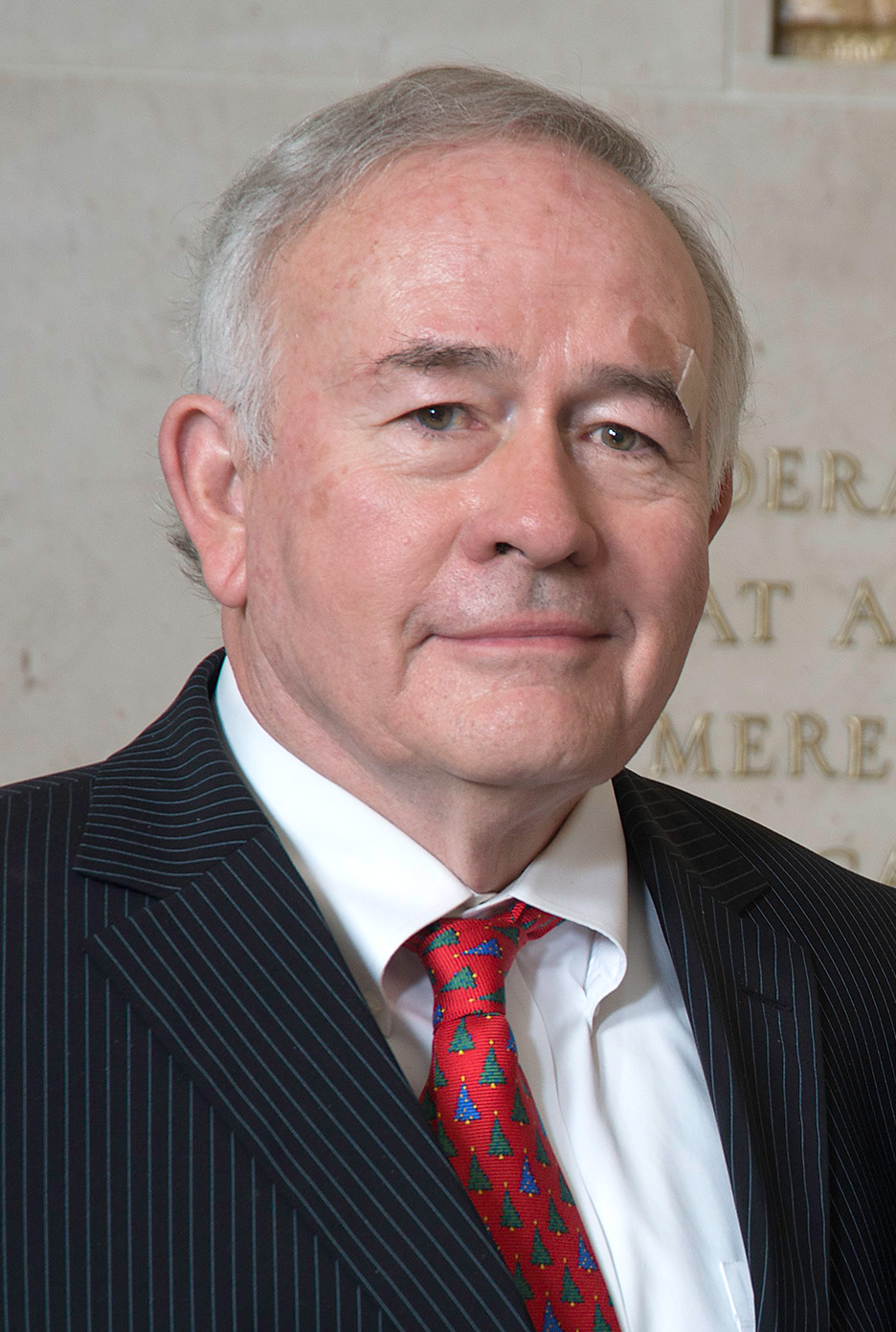
- McTeer in 2014

12th Chancellor of the Texas A&M University System
- In office November 4, 2004 – November 22, 2006
- Preceded by: A. Benton Cocanougher
- Succeeded by: Michael D. McKinney

President of the Federal Reserve Bank of Dallas
- In office February 1, 1991 – November 1, 2004
- Preceded by: Robert Boykin
- Succeeded by: Richard W. Fisher

Personal details
- Born: 1943 (age 82–83) Ranger, Georgia, U.S.
- Education: University of Georgia (BBA, MA, PhD)

Robert D. McTeer Jr. (born c. 1943) is an American economist, and has been a fellow at the US National Center for Policy Analysis since January 2007. McTeer is a former president of the Federal Reserve Bank of Dallas (1991–2004), and a former chancellor of the Texas A&M University System.

== Early life ==
Born in Ranger, Georgia, he earned his BBA and Ph.D. in economics from the University of Georgia where he is a member of the Sigma Chi fraternity and was also a member of the Phi Kappa Literary Society. He taught there for two years before joining the Federal Reserve Bank of Richmond.

== Professional career ==
He worked for the Federal Reserve for 36 years, including as president of the Federal Reserve Bank of Dallas from 1991 to 2005, where he was known for his plain, jargon-free public speaking and telling stories about growing up in rural Georgia. He has stated that one of his goals was "to translate economic sense into common sense".

As a member of the Federal Open Market Committee on the Federal Reserve, he was considered "dovish" on inflation and was one of the most consistent opponents of raising the federal funds rate in the late 1990s. He has stated that he does not believe in the NAIRU and Phillips curve.

He was succeeded as Federal Reserve Bank President by Richard W. Fisher.

== Academia career ==
On November 4, 2004, he succeeded A. Benton Cocanougher as the chancellor of the Texas A&M University System, until November 22, 2006, when he was succeeded by Michael D. McKinney.

== Television appearances ==
He was a frequent economics commentator on CNBC's Kudlow & Company.

Other offices
Preceded by Robert Boykin	President of the Federal Reserve Bank of Dallas; 1991–2004	Succeeded by Richard W. Fisher
