= System Open Market Account =

Asset portfolio of the US Federal Reserve

The System Open Market Account (SOMA) is a financial portfolio managed by the Federal Reserve Bank of New York that holds the assets it has purchased through open market operations (OMOs) in the course of carrying out monetary policy. Through SOMA transactions, the Federal Reserve System influences interest rates and the amount of reserves in the US banking system. Income from SOMA assets also provides funding for the Federal Reserve's activities, which are not funded by Congress. The Federal Open Market Committee (FOMC) instructs the Reserve Bank of New York as to how it should use the SOMA to support monetary policy.

== Purpose ==
SOMA's primary purpose is to assist the New York Fed in carrying out open market operations (OMOs) and foreign exchange interventions (the U.S. Treasury, in consultation with the Federal Reserve System, is responsible for setting U.S. exchange rate policy). The U.S. monetary authorities—the Treasury and the Fed—may intervene in the foreign exchange market to counter disorderly market conditions, using funds that belong to the Federal Reserve and to the Exchange Stabilization Fund (ESF) of the Treasury Department.

Following the 2008 financial crisis and the Great Recession, the FOMC "increased the size and adjusted the composition of the SOMA portfolio in efforts to promote the Committee’s mandate to foster maximum employment and price stability".

SOMA securities serve three purposes:

- Collateral for U.S. currency in circulation and other reserve factors that show up as liabilities on the Fed's balance sheet
- A tool for the Fed's management of reserve balances
- A tool for achieving the Fed's macroeconomic objectives

== Composition and management ==
The SOMA is subdivided into domestic and foreign portfolios. As of the end of 2023, the value of the domestic portfolio was stated as $7.5 trillion (amortized cost), including $5 trillion in Treasury securities and $2.5 trillion in agency securities. The foreign portfolio held $20 billion in assets at fair market value. Interest on the portfolio provides virtually all of the Fed's income, but the central bank buys and sells securities purely to implement U.S. monetary policy and not for profit.

Each Reserve Bank's participation share in the SOMA is determined during the system's annual settlement of balances. The settlement process makes use of the system's gold certificates that, despite the abandonment of the gold standard in the 20th century, still have a nominal role in backing US currency. Participation in the foreign portfolio is determined first by allocating each Reserve Bank a share in proportion to its year-end capital and surplus. The change from the previous share is offset with an adjustment to the Reserve Bank's clearing balance with the rest of the system. Next, each Reserve Bank calculates its average daily clearing balance during the past year. It adjusts its ownership of the gold certificates by that amount and makes an offsetting adjustment to its current clearing balance. Finally, each Reserve Bank adjusts its gold certificate ownership again so that the ratio of its ownership to its outstanding Federal Reserve Notes matches the systemwide ratio, and makes an offsetting adjustment to its share of the domestic portfolio. The resulting share percentages are then effective for the following year.

The New York Fed has an open data web page that allows people to export historical data of SOMA holdings from 2003 to the present as a Microsoft Excel spreadsheet. SOMA holdings data is updated weekly.

== Balance history ==
The size of the SOMA portfolio has fluctuated according to the demands of monetary policy. From a value of $800 billion at the end of 2007 it increased to a post-crisis peak of $4.2 trillion in January 2014 before the Federal Reserve started to unwind it in 2018. The COVID-19 pandemic interrupted that process, and the account increased again to a peak of $8.5 trillion in April 2022, then proceeded to unwind again at a faster pace than before.
