= Federal Reserve Bank of Dallas =

Member Bank of Federal Reserve

Coordinates: 32°47′30″N 96°48′01″W

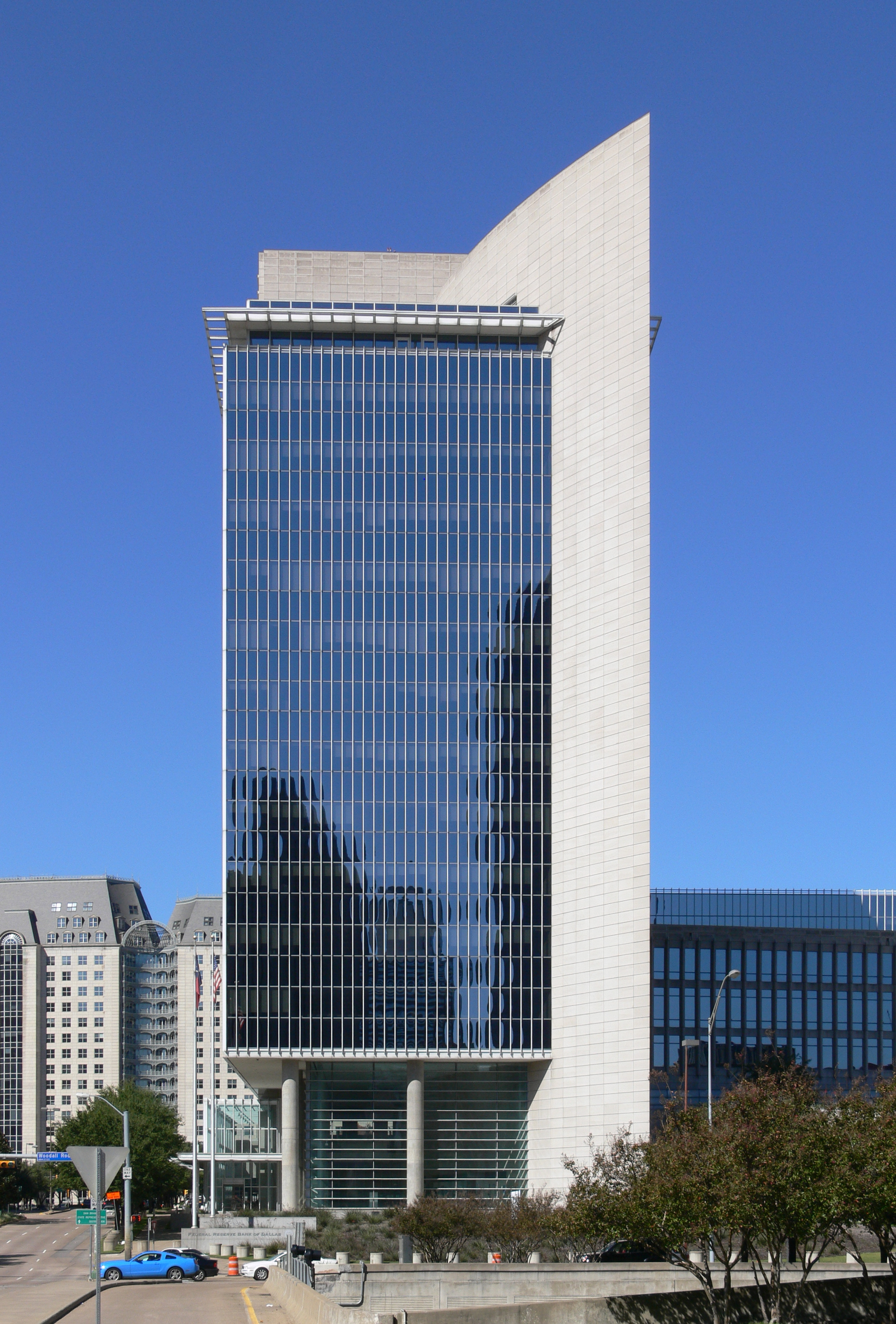
- The Federal Reserve Bank of Dallas in 2009
- Central bank of: Eleventh District: Texas Parts of: Louisiana; New Mexico
- Headquarters: 2200 N. Pearl St. Dallas, Texas, U.S.
- Established: May 18, 1914 (112 years ago)
- President: Lorie K. Logan
- Website: dallasfed.org
- The Federal Reserve Bank of Dallas is one of 12 regional banks that make up the Federal Reserve System

The Federal Reserve Bank of Dallas (informally referred to as the Dallas Fed) is one of the twelve Federal Reserve Banks of the United States. It is responsible for the Eleventh District of the Federal Reserve System, which encompasses Texas, northern Louisiana and southern New Mexico, a region sometimes referred to as the Oil Patch. The district is headquartered in Dallas and has branch offices in El Paso, Houston, and San Antonio. The bank's chief executive officer and president is Lorie K. Logan.

The Dallas bank is located at 2200 Pearl St. in the Uptown neighborhood of Oak Lawn, just north of downtown Dallas and the Dallas Arts District.

== History ==
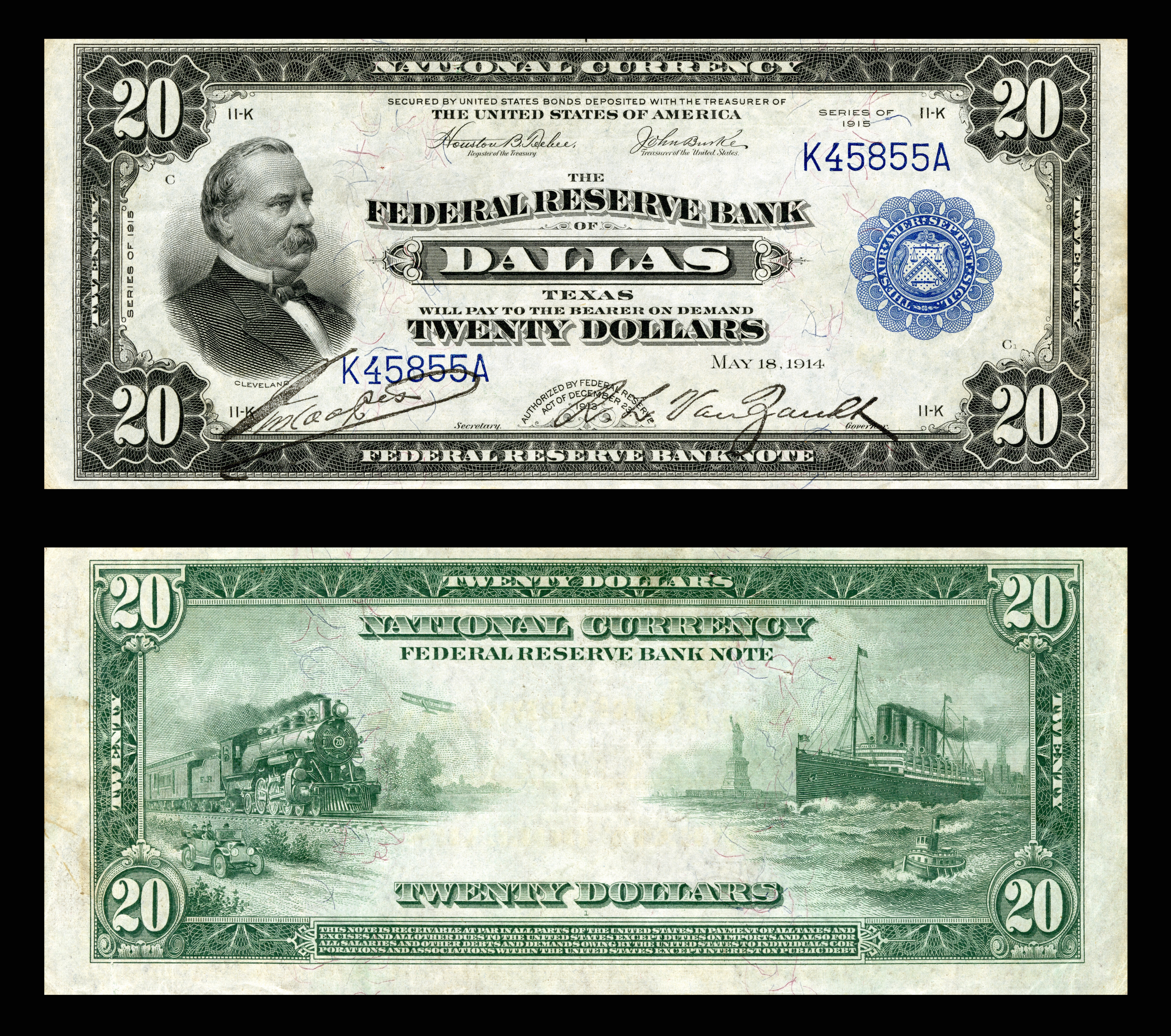
$20 1915 Dallas District FRBN.

Dallas was selected in 1914 to be the headquarters of the Eleventh District, in a somewhat surprising move. Originally, New Orleans was considered the favorite; however, while both cities had similarly sized banking operations, Dallas' activity had increased significantly while New Orleans' remained relatively flat, and therefore Dallas was chosen.

Prior to 1992, the bank was located at 400 S. Akard Street, in the Government District in downtown. The older Dallas Fed building, which opened in 1921, was designed in the Beaux-Arts style. It is a large limestone structure with massive carved eagles and additional significant detailing; it is a City of Dallas Designated Landmark structure. The current Dallas Fed building, opened in 1992, was designed by three architectural firms: Kohn Pedersen Fox Associates, New York; Sikes Jennings Kelly & Brewer, Houston; and John S. Chase, FAIA, Dallas and Houston. Dallas-based Austin Commercial Inc. served as project manager and general contractor.

The Dallas Fed is the nation's central processor for Treasury coupons and manages the national Electronic Transfer Account program, processing checks for federal benefit recipients. The Dallas Fed has also focused on research dealing with maquiladoras and other U.S.–Mexico border economic activities.

The current president is Lorie K. Logan, who assumed office in August 2022. Logan succeeded Robert Steven Kaplan, who resigned in October 2021.

== Board of directors ==
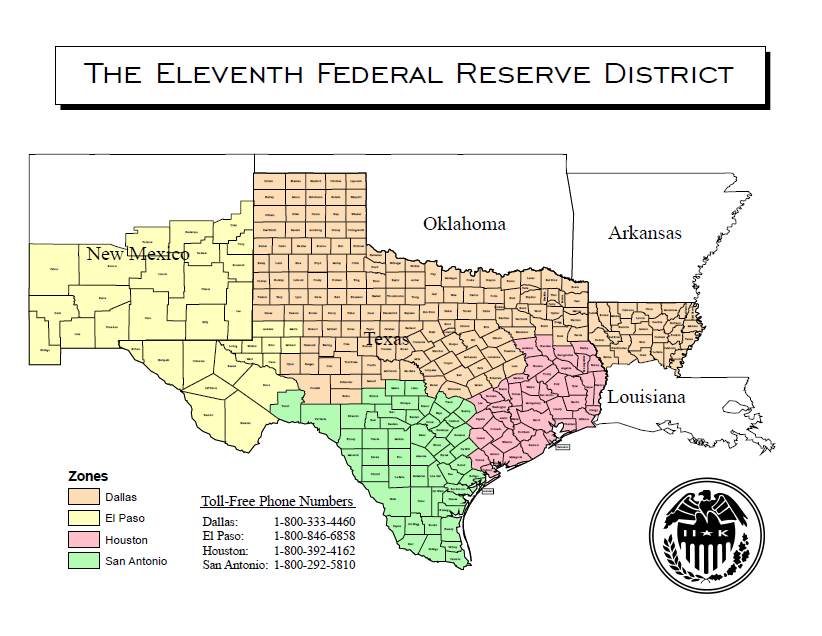
Map of the Eleventh District

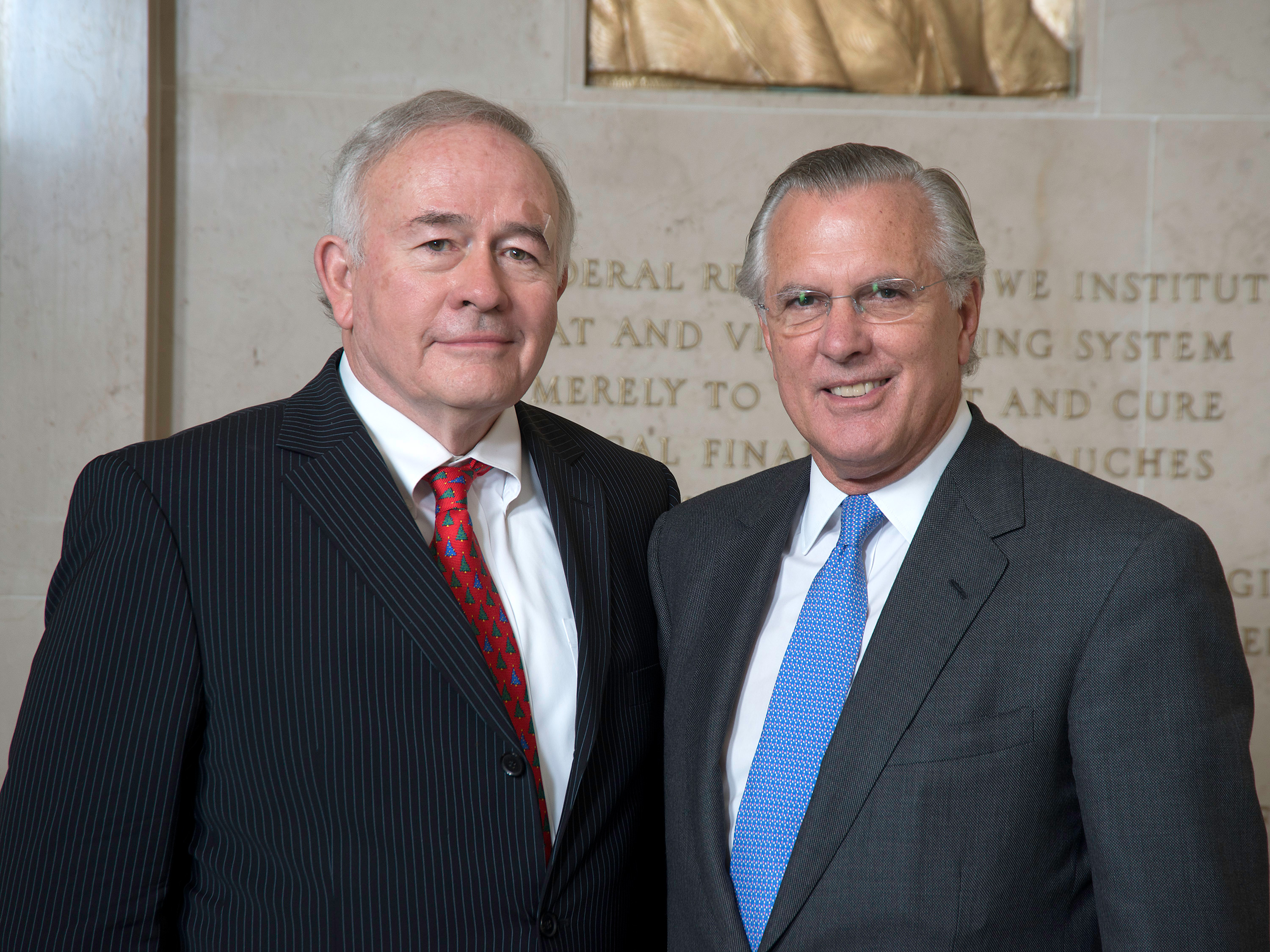
Former Dallas Fed Presidents Robert D. McTeer (1991–2004, left) and Richard W. Fisher (2005–2015, right)

The following people serve on the Board of Directors as of 2026:

Members of board of directors
Director	Title	Director Class (Note: Class A directors are elected by member banks to represent member banks. Class B directors are elected by member banks to represent the public. Class C directors are appointed by the Federal Reserve Board of Governors to represent the public.)	Term Expires (Note: Terms expire on December 31.)
Robert A. Hulsey	President and Chief Executive Officer, American National Bank of Texas Terrell, Texas	A	2026
Victor Pierson	Chief Executive Officer, Director, and President, Moody Bancshares, Inc., and Chairman, President, and Chief Executive Officer, Moody National Bank Galveston, Texas	A	2027
Harry J. Brooks	Chairman, President, and Chief Executive Officer, Citizens State Bank Woodville, Texas	A	2028
Pascal Desroches	Senior Executive Vice President and Chief Financial Officer, AT&T Dallas, Texas	B	2026
James K. Hill	President, James Hill Consulting, and Director, Neeley Center for Real Estate, Texas Christian University Fort Worth, Texas	B	2027
Hunter L. Hunt	Chairman and Chief Executive Officer, Hunt Energy, LLC, and Co-Chief Executive Officer, Hunt Consolidated, Inc. Dallas, Texas	B	2028
Claudia Aguirre (Chair)	President and Chief Executive Officer, BakerRipley Houston, Texas	C	2026
Gary C. Kelly (Deputy Chair)	Chairman Emeritus, Southwest Airlines Dallas, Texas	C	2027
Ruth J. Simmons	Distinguished Presidential Fellow, Rice University Houston, Texas	C	2028

== Branches ==
- Federal Reserve Bank of Dallas El Paso Branch
- Federal Reserve Bank of Dallas Houston Branch
- Federal Reserve Bank of Dallas San Antonio Branch

== See also ==
- Federal Reserve Act
- Structure of the Federal Reserve System
