= Need I Say Door =

- Peacemaker episode
- Episode no.: Season 2 Episode 4
- Directed by: Peter Sollett
- Written by: James Gunn
- Cinematography by: Scott Peck
- Editing by: Zene Baker; Scott A. Jacobs
- Original air date: September 11, 2025
- Running time: 39 minutes

Guest appearances
- Myles Benson as Chris Smith (young); Bryson Haney as Keith Smith (young)

Episode chronology
← Previous "Another Rick Up My Sleeve"	Next → "Back to the Suture"
- Peacemaker season 2

"Need I Say Door" is the fourth episode of the second season of the American black comedy superhero drama television series Peacemaker. It is the twelfth overall episode of the series and was directed by Peter Sollett from a script written by creator and showrunner James Gunn. It originally aired on HBO Max on September 11, 2025.

In the episode, John Economos reluctantly cooperates with A.R.G.U.S. agents in orchestrating a raid on Chris Smith / Peacemaker's residence, forcing the latter to take his father's Quantum Unfolding Chamber and go into hiding with the help of Leota Adebayo and Adrian Chase / Vigilante. Meanwhile, Rick Flag Sr. offers Emilia Harcourt the opportunity to rejoin the organization in exchange for bringing Smith in.

== Plot ==
35 years ago, Chris Smith accompanies his brother Keith and their father Auggie on a hunt where they discover an extraterrestrial creature. In spite of Keith's pleas to spare it, Auggie kills the creature, and the trio discover the Quantum Unfolding Chamber (QUC) that it used to travel to their reality, prompting them to take it for themselves.

In the present, a team of A.R.G.U.S. agents led by Sasha Bordeaux are en route to Chris's residence, planning a raid to arrest him and retrieve the QUC. Operative John Economos reluctantly accompanies bird hunter Red St. Wild, who was hired by the organization to kill Chris's pet bald eagle Eagly following its neutralization of agent Langston Fleury's strike team the night before. (Note: As seen in the episode "A Man Is Only as Good as His Bird") Economos alerts Chris to his team's presence, enabling Chris to flee the house with the QUC. St. Wild attempts to shoot Eagly, but Economos knocks him out. While evading A.R.G.U.S., Chris defeats Rip Jagger / Judomaster in the woods and messages Leota Adebayo to pick up and take them to a cabin in Settlers' Hills.

Economos stalls unlocking the doorway into the QUC for Bordeaux's team while Chris and Adebayo successfully open it within the cabin, causing the door at his home to lead into a closet when accessed by Bordeaux. Adrian Chase meets up with the pair to install door hinges on the entrance at Chris's request. A.R.G.U.S. director Rick Flag Sr. visits former agent Emilia Harcourt and tempts her with the prospect of rejoining the organization in exchange for her assistance in capturing Peacemaker, leveraging her personal relationship towards him. Chris subsequently messages her, and she relays her plan to rendezvous with him at Kupperberg Park. Chris takes Adrian's car to meet with Harcourt, unaware that Flag Sr. and his team are also waiting for him. Meanwhile, St. Wild performs a magic ritual that grants him visions, allowing him to locate Eagly at the cabin.

== Production ==
=== Development ===
In February 2022, Peacemaker was renewed for a second season with James Gunn attached to return as showrunner and writer on all episodes. By 2024, he was unable to also direct the whole season as a result of filming being set to take place simultaneously with the DC Universe (DCU) film Superman (2025) that same year, and began searching for other filmmakers to helm certain episodes in the interest of releasing the season as soon as possible. Filmmaker Peter Sollett was revealed to be directing an episode of the second season by that July.

=== Writing ===
A new character set to appear in the second season of Peacemaker was first teased by Gunn in October 2024 during principal photography. Michael Rooker, a frequent collaborator on Gunn's projects, having previously portrayed Savant in the DC Extended Universe (DCEU) film The Suicide Squad (2021) and voiced Sam Fitzgibbon in the first season of the DCU animated series Creature Commandos (2024–present), was officially announced as cast in the second season in May 2025, with the character revealed to be Red St. Wild, who is original to the series with no basis in the comics. Gunn recognized that Peacemaker's pet Eagly became the "most popular character" during the first season of the show and felt that giving him a nemesis would allow Eagly to have his own story arc separate from the former.

The episode gestures towards explaining how Auggie created the various specialized helmets Peacemaker uses in his vigilante activities, but the storyline did not make it into the season despite being internally conceived by Gunn.

== Reception ==
"Need I Say Door" received highly positive reviews from critics. Scott Collura of IGN gave the episode a "good" 7 out of 10 and wrote in his verdict, "“Need I Say Door” focuses back in on what's going on in Peacemaker's Prime dimension, hitting some cool moments and dropping, as usual, a ton of fun dialogue. It's also setting up a conflict between Harcourt and, most likely, the rest of the 11th Street Kids. That said, as with a lot of the season so far, it also feels at times like not a ton is actually moving forward week to week. But regardless, Michael Rooker's Red St. Wild going on that weird spiritual trip at the end of the episode has got to be one of the greatest moments in the history of DC, full stop."

Scott Meslow of Vulture gave the episode a 4-star rating out of 5 and wrote, "It may not be subtle, but it resonates. Peacemaker's second season has been just as funny as its first, but the best gags have largely been delivered by wacky side characters like Tim Meadows' Langston Fleury or Michael Rooker's Red St. Wild." Joe George of Den of Geek wrote, "By this point, no one is surprised to find a weird alien in a DC Comics project. Nor, really, are we surprised to find one in a project from James Gunn, the guy who brought to the screen broccoli people and Starro the Conqueror."

Kendall Myers of Collider gave the episode a 9 out of 10 rating and wrote, "With an explanation about the source of the interdimensional door and a new mystical backstory for Eagly, the episode adds some strange elements to the world, but it never slows down, making Peacemaker's latest installment a highlight of Season 2." Chris Gallardo of Telltale TV gave the episode a 3.5 star rating out of 5 and wrote, "Despite it being mostly action-focused, Peacemaker Season 2 Episode 4 does a satisfying job in raising the narrative stakes while revealing new narrative details that may hold weight for Chris and his allies."

Felipe Rangel of Screen Rant wrote, "By the end of the hour, the show successfully managed to make me feel more for John Cena's Peacemaker. I'm invested in the emotional fallout that could come from Harcourt's decision to turn him in. While episode 4 is not the most thrilling of Peacemaker season 2, it lays the groundwork for next week's entry to pick up the pace again." Paul Dailly of TV Fanatic gave the episode a 4 star rating out of 5 and wrote, "Peacemaker has always walked a fine line between ridiculous spectacle and genuine emotional depth, and Peacemaker Season 2 Episode 4 might be the strongest example of that balancing act yet."
