= Another Rick Up My Sleeve =

- Peacemaker episode
- Episode no.: Season 2 Episode 3
- Directed by: Greg Mottola
- Written by: James Gunn
- Cinematography by: Sam McCurdy
- Editing by: Zene Baker
- Original air date: September 4, 2025
- Running time: 37 minutes

Guest appearance
- Joel Kinnaman as Rick Flag Jr. (uncredited)

Episode chronology
← Previous "A Man Is Only as Good as His Bird"	Next → "Need I Say Door"
- Peacemaker season 2

"Another Rick Up My Sleeve" is the third episode of the second season of the American black comedy superhero drama television series Peacemaker. It is the eleventh overall episode of the series, and was written by series creator James Gunn and directed by Greg Mottola. It originally aired on HBO Max on September 4, 2025.

Immediately following the preceding episode, Chris Smith / Peacemaker explores the alternate universe and connects with that world's Emilia Harcourt, while A.R.G.U.S. in the primary timeline coordinates a raid on Smith's residence after the failed investigation by Langston Fleury and his team the previous night.

The episode received highly positive reviews from critics, who praised the performances, Joel Kinnaman's return as Rick Flag Jr., and emotional tone.

== Plot ==
Three years prior, Emilia Harcourt is having an affair with Rick Flag Jr. Despite his attempts to move to something more serious, she dismisses it. She asks him to hurry up, as he must leave for a mission in Corto Maltese. (Note: As depicted in the DC Extended Universe film The Suicide Squad (2021))

In the present day, Chris Smith awakens in his alternate self's bedroom. Finding that the alternate Harcourt has answered his text and asked to meet up, he rides his motorcycle to the A.R.G.U.S. headquarters. On his way, he is elated to see that the public loves him. At A.R.G.U.S., Chris meets Harcourt, but also encounters Flag Jr., who is still alive in this universe and dating Harcourt. She agrees to talk with Chris, leaving Flag Jr. jealous. At a park, Harcourt discloses that she left Chris because he was not ready to commit, but he maintains he has changed. In the original universe, Leota Adebayo and Harcourt discuss Chris, with the former convinced that Harcourt still harbors feelings for him.

Chris and the alternate Harcourt are shell-shocked when a man explodes in the park. The man is part of a terrorist organization, the Sons of Liberty, who have taken the local DMV hostage and plan to kill many government officials until their demands are met. Chris sneaks in via an adjacent building, killing all the Sons, freeing their hostages, and deactivating a bomb. Keith, in his superhero outfit as Captain Triumph, helps destroy the Sons' getaway helicopter.

In the original universe, John Economos is reprimanded by Sasha Bordeaux for not informing them of Chris's pet Eagly, who severely injured A.R.G.U.S. operatives attempting to infiltrate his home. She mobilizes a team of agents, including Langston Fleury, eagle hunter Red St. Wild, and martial artist Rip Jagger / Judomaster, to Chris's house once more. After having an emotional conversation with Keith, Chris returns to his dimension, unaware that the A.R.G.U.S. team is ready to raid his house.

== Production ==
=== Development ===
In February 2022, when Peacemaker was renewed for a second season, James Gunn was confirmed to write all episodes. The episode was written by Gunn, and directed by Greg Mottola. It marked Gunn's eleventh writing credit, and Mottola's second directing credit.

=== Writing ===
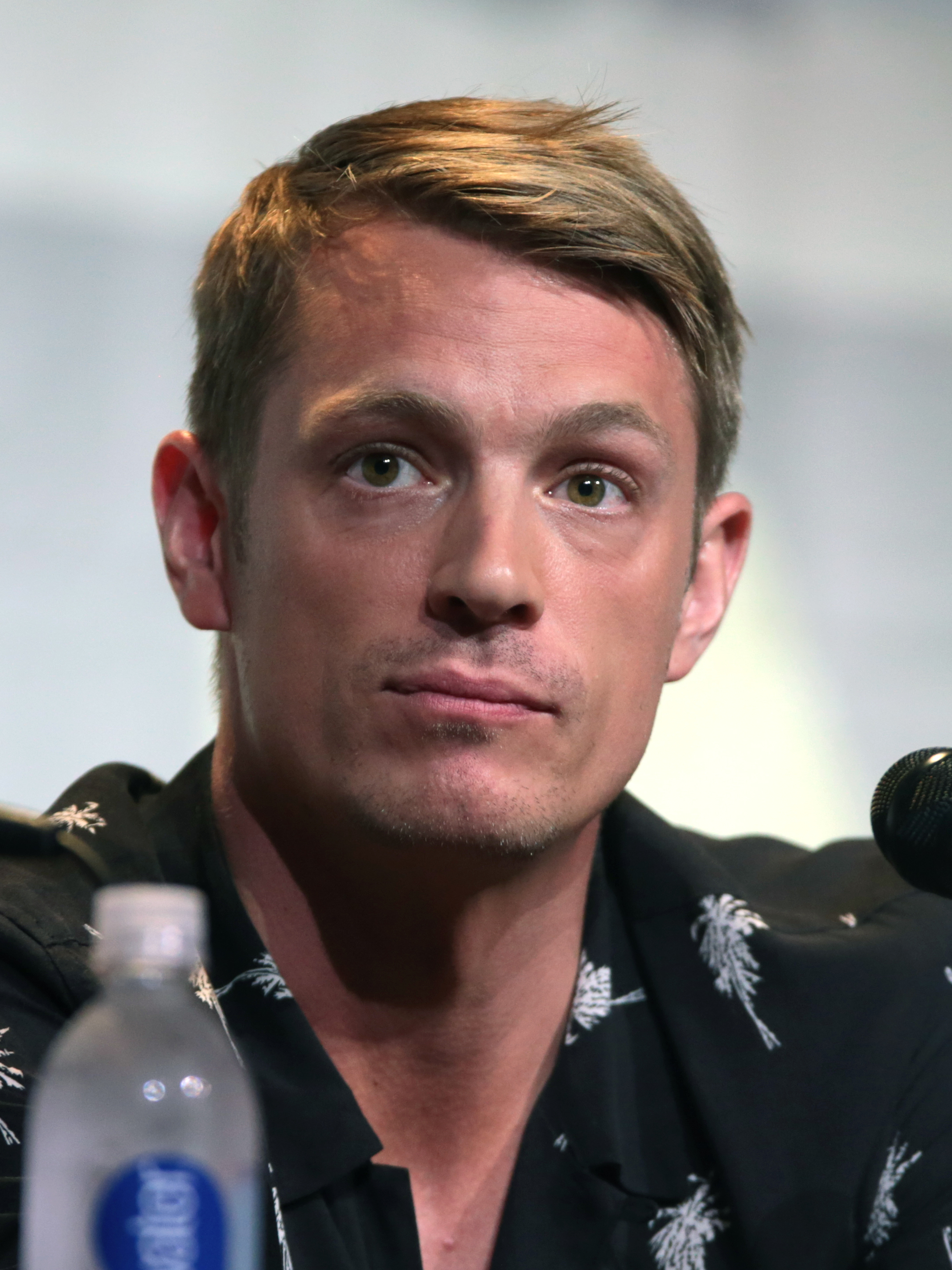
Joel Kinnaman guest stars as Rick Flag Jr. in the episode.

Joel Kinnaman guest stars in the episode, reprising his role as Rick Flag Jr. from the DC Extended Universe (DCEU). Kinnaman also portrays an alternate counterpart of Flag from "Earth-2", who is dating that world's Emilia Harcourt following her break-up with Chris Smith / Peacemaker-2. Gunn was very interested in bringing him back for comedic purposes, explaining, "Joel and I are good friends, so I asked him to do me a favor, but I also wanted to give him an opportunity to do something that's purely comedic, because he's a really funny guy. He's never been in a comedy his entire life, so being able to show him doing this sort of namby-pamby version of Rick Flag Jr... every time I watch those scenes, I laugh out loud."

In addition to expanding on events in the DCEU film The Suicide Squad (2021), the episode also alludes to Flag Jr.'s relationship with June Moone / Enchantress, whom he was romantically involved with during the events of that film's predecessor, Suicide Squad (2016). Gunn confirmed on Peacemaker: The Official Podcast that the revelation of his affair with Harcourt had been planned prior to production on the first season. According to Jennifer Holland, Gunn told her that Harcourt and Flag were having an affair before the events of the series, which would help her justify her character's anger towards Chris. She says, "It helped me to understand why it was okay for me to be a total [cunt], for lack of a better word, to Christopher Smith. Her moral compass is very specific. And that's, you can do really morally [fucked] up things, as long as it's not to the people who have entrusted their life to you, who are on your team. She's a soldier, and so she believes in no man behind even if that means that you don't like them."

== Reception ==
"Another Rick Up My Sleeve" received highly positive reviews from critics. Jarrod Jones of The A.V. Club gave the episode a "B+" grade and wrote, "All told, this week's Peacemaker is livelier than the last but no less emotionally present or surprising. The final scene between Chris and Keith, where Cena and Denman share a tender moment between brothers, reasserts both the ache of regret that has resonated throughout the series since the very beginning and the dramatic, dimensional rift to come."

Scott Meslow of Vulture gave the episode a 3 star rating out of 5 and wrote, "For now, however, Chris seems content to bask in the glow of this alternate universe, unaware of the enemies bearing down on him."

Joe George of Den of Geek wrote, "Most of all, the Sons of Liberty represent hope for Chris Smith. If even a nothing character like Agent Liberty can join the Justice League, then maybe there's hope that Peacemaker can be accepted, if not on the Justice League then maybe the Justice Gang." Kendall Myers of Collider gave the episode a 9 out of 10 rating and wrote, "Episode 3 is not short on action, but with a tense confrontation set up for next week, the return of Judomaster, and the introduction of Red St. Wild, a violent eagle hunter, this seems like only the beginning. However, Season 2 still struggles with incorporating all the characters now that they are no longer working as a team."

Felipe Rangel of Screen Rant wrote, "The show continues to remind us of its TV-MA status, and Peacemaker violently dispatching a group of criminals to stop bombs from going off falls in line with that. Episode 3 ends Peacemaker's latest chapter with the character feeling on top of the world. Will this last forever? Doubtful, but episode 4 will definitively answer it next week." Chris Gallardo of Telltale TV gave the episode a 4.2 star rating out of 5 and wrote, "Peacemaker Season 2 Episode 3 confidently develops the complex dynamic between Chris and Harcourt while showcasing the narrative importance of this “Elseworld”. As it presents viewers the potential of what Chris' work as a superhero can be like, it also does a great job highlighting the intricacy of how to move on from the past."

Isaac Rouse of Polygon wrote, "The violent, heedless way he handles the situation is the final confirmation viewers need to deduce that this is just who Chris is, regardless of what he tells others about his emotional growth or newfound respect for life. Left to make his own decisions, he's destructive first and foremost, and his destructive tendencies are only heroic to the extent that he chooses to aim them in the right direction." Paul Dailly of TV Fanatic gave the episode a 4.5 star rating out of 5 and wrote, "Three episodes in, Peacemaker Season 2 has found its groove. It's more ambitious than Peacemaker Season 1, and while the multiverse storyline risks tipping into messy territory, right now it's enriching Chris's journey. If anyone deserves a do-over, it's him."
