= A Man Is Only as Good as His Bird =

- Peacemaker episode
- Episode no.: Season 2 Episode 2
- Directed by: Greg Mottola
- Written by: James Gunn
- Cinematography by: Sam McCurdy
- Editing by: Zene Baker
- Original release date: August 28, 2025
- Running time: 49 minutes

Guest appearance
- Elizabeth Faith Ludlow as Keeya Adebayo

Episode chronology
← Previous "The Ties That Grind"	Next → "Another Rick Up My Sleeve"
- Peacemaker season 2

"A Man Is Only as Good as His Bird" is the second episode of the second season of the American black comedy superhero drama television series Peacemaker. It is the tenth episode overall of the series, and was directed by Greg Mottola from a script written by series creator and showrunner James Gunn. It originally aired on HBO Max on August 28, 2025.

Directly picking up from the previous episode, Chris Smith / Peacemaker is dealing with the emotional and physical toll of accidentally killing his alternate self from a parallel dimension, and struggles to open up to his former teammates about his turmoil. Meanwhile, A.R.G.U.S. director Rick Flag Sr. assigns a supervisor to agent John Economos, who is similarly conflicted about being tasked to monitor Peacemaker for the organization.

The episode received positive reviews from critics, who praised Meadows' performance, the dynamic between Peacemaker and Vigilante and the balance of humor and sincerity.

== Plot ==
In a flashback, A.R.G.U.S. agent John Economos guides Rick Flag Sr. to his new personal office as the acting director of the organization, the latter having been sworn in to succeed Amanda Waller, who is facing congressional hearings. Flag is supplied with confidential documentation detailing the death of his son in Corto Maltese during "Project Starfish", (Note: As seen in the DC Extended Universe film The Suicide Squad (2021).) learning of Chris Smith / Peacemaker's responsibility for assassinating him under Waller's orders. Flag Sr. relays to agent Sasha Bordeaux his intentions to prioritize surveillance of Peacemaker, despite his exoneration following "Project Butterfly." (Note: As depicted in the Peacemaker season 1 episode "It's Cow or Never".)

Eight months later, Economos is issued Agent Langston Fleury as a handler after Flag Sr. grows increasingly suspicious of the former's allegiance to Chris and his colleagues. Leota Adebayo returns to the apartment of her ex-wife Keeya, who angrily reprimands her for being inconsiderate of the latter's personal wishes. Afterwards, Adebayo visits Chris and tells him about Flag monitoring his activities, while suggesting he forfeit his Quantum Unfolding Chamber (QUC) to A.R.G.U.S., an idea Chris rejects. Adrian Chase meets with the pair and learns about the parallel dimension Chris previously visited, helping the latter dispose of his alternate counterpart's corpse. The 11th Street Kids (Peacemaker, Adebayo, Harcourt, Adrian, and Economos) hold a rooftop party at Harcourt's apartment. Chris attempts to console Harcourt about her recent injuries, which she angrily resists. Meanwhile, Fleury and a team of A.R.G.U.S. agents raid Chris' residence in search of the interdimensional energy signature coming from the QUC, but are brutally assaulted by his bald eagle pet, Eagly.

A drunken Chris returns to his home and searches through the alternate Peacemaker's phone which he had retrieved while disposing of the body. He attempts to text the other universe's Harcourt, the alternate universe Peacemaker's ex-girlfriend, but the message fails to send due to Chris being in his original reality. Chris returns to the parallel dimension through the QUC, and successfully makes contact with the alternate Harcourt as he overhears both the alternate Peacemaker's father and brother looking for him.

== Production ==
=== Development ===
By 2024, showrunner James Gunn rescinded his original intention of directing all the episodes for the second season of Peacemaker, with production set to take place simultaneously with the DC Universe (DCU) film Superman (2025) and his interest in getting the season out as soon as possible. Filmmaker Greg Mottola was revealed to be directing two episodes of the second season that June.

=== Writing ===
The episode links the storyline of the season, which is set in the DCU, with events that transpired in The Suicide Squad (2021), a film set in the preceding DC Extended Universe (DCEU) franchise. The opening establishes that following the events of the first season of the DCU series Creature Commandos (2024), Amanda Waller is succeeded as director of A.R.G.U.S. by Rick Flag Sr., the former field commander for Task Force M and the father of Rick Flag Jr., the field commander of Task Force X in the DCEU who was killed by series protagonist Chris Smith / Peacemaker under orders from Waller during "Project Starfish" on Corto Maltese. Series showrunner James Gunn considers Flag Sr. the antagonist of season 2, and expressed his enjoyment of contrasting his adversarial depiction in the season to his introduction as a protagonist in Creature Commandos.

The character of Langston Fleury, an A.R.G.U.S. agent assigned to supervise John Economos as he continued to monitor Peacemaker, was one Gunn considered among the hardest he ever had to cast, stating that Tim Meadows was offered and ultimately signed to portray after "hundreds" of actors auditioned for the part. Fleury was described as assuming the role of the "total asshole" in the ensemble that Peacemaker himself previously occupied throughout much of the first season.

== Reception ==
"A Man Is Only as Good as His Bird" received acclaim from critics. Paul Dailly awarded the episode a 4.75 out of 5 stars in his review for TV Fanatic, praising the dynamic between John Cena's Peacemaker and Freddie Stroma's Vigilante, as well as the tonal balance between comedy and sincerity he felt was a strength of the series thus far. Beatrix Kondo from Soap Central praised the depiction of Eagly as a formidable combatant and loyal pet to Chris, remarking that it was a showcase of the character's willingness to "fight with clarity and purpose" where Eagly had been previously used for comedic purposes throughout the previous season.

=== Accolades ===
TVLine named Tim Meadows as an honorable mention for the "Performer of the Week" for the week of August 30, 2025, for his performance in the episode. The site wrote, "Working off of a James Gunn script laced with hilariously random opinions and asides, if Meadows made you laugh once at the “Ginger Cool” moniker he forced on Economos, he made you laugh every... single... time."
