= Peacemaker: The Official Podcast with James Gunn =

2025 superhero podcast

- Format: Video podcast
- Country of origin: United States
- Language: English

Cast and voices
- Hosted by: James Gunn; Jennifer Holland; Steve Agee

Production
- Camera: Chris Pieper; AJ Kneip
- Production: Toby Lawless; Erin Kelly; Jesse Holland; Tess Bartholomew; Kris Smith
- Editing: Jesse Holland; Luis Sinibaldi; Mark Alcasid
- Length: 42-73 minutes

Publication
- No. of seasons: 2
- No. of episodes: 16
- Original release: July 25 – October 9, 2025
- Provider: YouTube
- Updates: Thursdays
- License: Standard YouTube License

Related
- Related shows: Peacemaker
- Website: YouTube

Peacemaker: The Official Podcast with James Gunn is a podcast hosted by James Gunn, Jennifer Holland, and Steve Agee. Produced by DC Studios, the podcast details each episode of the television series Peacemaker, explaining what parts of the series' first season were being maintained as part of the canon of the DC Universe (DCU), a reboot of the DC Extended Universe (DCEU), its predecessor franchise, of which the season was a part. As Peacemaker season 2 aired, episodes continued to cover the second season. The podcast was tracked closely by reports of what remained canon, which was the main marketing draw used by Gunn.

== Background ==
As he took over DC Studios, James Gunn had soft-rebooted the DC Extended Universe (DCEU) into the DC Universe (DCU), though he maintained certain elements of The Suicide Squad (2021) and Peacemaker (2022–25) season 1 as part of canon. The podcast was created as a way of breaking down each episode of the first season and explaining precisely which parts of given episodes are canon to the new franchise and which parts are not. GamesRadar+ described Gunn's promotion of the podcast as "urging" fans to watch so they knew what was canon.

== Premise ==
James Gunn hosts the podcast alongside Jennifer Holland, who portrays Emilia Harcourt, and Steve Agee, who portrays John Economos. They have had multiple guest hosts, including Adrian Chase actor Freddie Stroma, Clemson Murn actor Chukwudi Iwuji, and executive producer Lars Winther. In it, they discuss each episode, often including behind the scenes information, such as a different planned ending for the season. Gunn also acknowledged at one point that the access point to the Quantum Unfolding Chamber changed appearances between seasons because Gunn forgot that it was a bookcase in the first season, making it a closet door in the second. He elaborated that the chamber would be explored further in the second season.

One of the main features of each episode discussing the first season was what elements of the season were being carried over from the DC Extended Universe (DCEU) into the rebooted new DC Universe (DCU). The discussions largely pertained to references to other DC Comics characters not in the series. Characters that remained canon included Matter-Eater Lad, Doll Man, and Kite Man. Other characters were considered not to have carried over, such as Aquaman, Bat-Mite, Green Arrow, and the Justice League. When discussing the Justice League, Gunn delayed discussions by saying the situation would be addressed in the first episode of the second season. Gunn also specifically referred to mentions of Wonder Woman and Barry Allen, expressing uncertainty about whether they are already established superheroes during the events of the season. In contrast, he said that Peacemaker's references to Superman did remain canon. In referring to Clemson Murn, he said that while the character exists, his appearance is not due to potentially wanting to cast Iwuji in a different role in the future. Gunn also occasionally commented on elements not from DC Comics being canon, such as the film Porky's (1981) and Cheetos.

As the second season of the series proceeded, Gunn began explaining his process in creating the world of the DC Universe, such as introducing popular DC location Jitters Coffee and his willingness to kill off characters. He also explains the origin of certain aspects of the series, such as the imps alluded to in the season 2 episode "The Ties That Grind" and Adrian Chase's fascination of crows in the episode "Another Rick Up My Sleeve" being based on Gunn's own fascination. In another segment, the hosts answer questions taken from fans, at one point each answering who they would like to see their own characters fight.

== Release ==
Having been announced earlier in the week, the first episode of the podcast released July 24, 2025. They released episodes to go along with each episode of Peacemaker season 1. Starting August 21, 2025, with the release of the first episode of the second season, the podcast began releasing alongside each second season episode.

== Reception ==
SlashFilm expressed gratitude for the podcast's existence and clarifications about the DCU's canon. Bradley Russell from GamesRadar+ had a less positive review, marking the podcast as an addition to the confusion created by the shift in canon between the two seasons of Peacemaker. He explained, "In a way, Gunn has embraced the confusing, convoluted canon that has punctuated comic book stories for decades. Now, we just need to navigate the weeds of continuity and (largely) forget about what came before." Bleeding Cool monitored the podcast and consistently reported about Gunn's statements regarding DCU canon, starting with the first episode. Writer Ray Flook was satisfied that the episode was largely kept within canon.

Writing for Polygon, Samantha Nelson praised other aspects of the podcast, saying, "It's well worth listening to the show for all the behind-the-scenes details about the music choices, stuntwork, and cut plots, and the running segment on everything from season 1 of the show that is and isn't still canon in the new DCU."
