= Like a Keith in the Night =

- Peacemaker episode
- Episode no.: Season 2 Episode 7
- Directed by: Alethea Jones
- Written by: James Gunn
- Cinematography by: Scott Peck
- Editing by: Philip Fowler
- Original air date: October 2, 2025
- Running time: 33 minutes

Guest appearances
- Stephen Blackehart as Sydney Happersen; Lochlyn Munro as Detective Fitzgibbon

Episode chronology
← Previous "Ignorance Is Chris"	Next → "Full Nelson"
- Peacemaker season 2

"Like a Keith in the Night" is the seventh episode of the second season of the American black comedy superhero drama television series Peacemaker. It is the fifteenth overall episode of the series, and was written by series creator James Gunn and directed by Alethea Jones. It originally aired on HBO Max on October 2, 2025.

== Plot ==
After realizing Earth-2 is controlled by Nazis, Chris and Emilia Harcourt fight security before escaping on Chris's motorcycle.

Adrian is told by Adrian-2 that he has worked with the Sons of Liberty to fight back against the Nazi government. Adebayo runs away from the white supremacists, until she is saved by Judomaster, who electrocutes the mob in a pool. He takes her to a vacant house where he has been staying, explaining the history of the world after he read the residential history books. Auggie calls Keith to come home, where he has taken Economos hostage. Auggie reveals that Chris-2 is dead and that he knows about the Quantum Unfolding Chamber (QUC), where he met his Earth-1 counterpart. The two then find Chris and Harcourt and force them to come back to their mansion.

On Earth-1, Flag Sr. and Bordeaux visit former LuthorCorp employee Sydney Happersen. Using Luthor's communication hub, Sydney locates the portal.

Back at the mansion, Auggie and Keith interrogate Chris, who confesses his real identity and that he accidentally killed Chris-2, angering Keith. Police officers arrive at the mansion looking for Chris, but Auggie forces them to leave. Auggie is willing to let Chris and the rest return to their dimension, upsetting Keith, who wants revenge for Chris-2's death. When Harcourt calls him a Nazi, Auggie explains that he does not agree with the world he lives in and uses his influence to help pedestrians in any possible way. The Adrians, Adebayo, and Judomaster enter the mansion before Adrian-1 stabs Auggie to death. This prompts Keith to shoot at them, alerting the police.

The 11th Street Kids make their way back to the QUC. An angered Keith attacks Chris, until Eagly and the rest severely injure him. Traumatized, Chris breaks down and sobs over Keith's body, preventing the rest of the team from killing his brother. After Chris and the team leave, Harcourt attempts to execute Keith, but is stopped when the cops arrive, with Adrian-2 sending her through the portal. The gang returns to their world, where they are met by Flag Sr. and the A.R.G.U.S. forces. Chris turns himself in and hands the alien device to A.R.G.U.S. before taking the blame for everything, claiming the others convinced him to turn himself in, which Judomaster supports.

== Production ==
=== Development ===
In February 2022, when Peacemaker was renewed for a second season, James Gunn was confirmed to write all episodes. The episode was written by Gunn and directed by Alethea Jones. It marked Gunn's 15th writing credit, and Jones' second directing credit.

== Reception ==
"Like a Keith in the Night" received critical acclaim. Scott Collura of IGN gave the episode a "great" 8 out of 10 and wrote in his verdict, "Peacemaker's second season is finally sprinting, with this week's episode filling in some expected (if welcome) back story, as well as a surprising one in the case of alt-Auggie (RIP). The question now is whether or not everything that's been set up this season, and in this penultimate segment – like Chris' emotional breakdown, Rick Sr.'s real plan, the romance between Chris and Harcourt, the brewing fight between Chris and alt-Keith, and more – can be satisfyingly wrapped up with just one episode to go."

Jarrod Jones of The A.V. Club gave the episode an "A–" grade and wrote, "Gunn has never shied from twisting the knife at the most emotionally devastating moment, but 'Like a Keith in the Night' hits differently. It's the composition of Keith's imminent slaughter: in front of Chris, who, in the moment, recalls what it looked like when he, as a kid, punched Keith to death."

Scott Meslow of Vulture gave the episode a 4 star rating out of 5 and wrote, "By cutting off Auggie's big speech sooner than might have been obvious, James Gunn is saying something, intentionally or not, about how seriously we should take the wisdom and regrets of a man like Auggie."

Joe George of Den of Geek wrote, "By showing that Earth-X Auggie isn't a virtuous hero, Peacemaker reminds us that the work of resisting fascism is ongoing, that it's not enough to simply intellectually disagree while enjoying all the benefits of an unequal society. By showing us a Superman who isn't a one-note paragon of good, we gain grace for ourselves and others, reminding us to forgive ourselves and one another when we slip up."

Chris Gallardo of Telltale TV gave the episode a 4 star rating out of 5 and wrote, "Peacemaker Season 2 Episode 7 is a tragically fulfilling penultimate episode through Chris facing his biggest fear, his 'perfect' world being undone, in an emotionally resonating way. Though it's one of Season 2's shorter episodes, it still manages to sear your heart with this hope and optimism being torn apart."
