= Peacemaker season 2 =

Peacemaker
- Season 2
- Promotional poster
- Showrunner: James Gunn
- Starring: John Cena; Danielle Brooks; Freddie Stroma; Jennifer Holland; Steve Agee; Frank Grillo; Robert Patrick
- No. of episodes: 8

Release
- Original network: HBO Max
- Original release: August 21 – October 9, 2025

Season chronology
- ← Previous; Season 1

The second and final season of the American television series Peacemaker is based on the eponymous character from DC Comics. While the first season is a spin-off from the DC Extended Universe (DCEU) film The Suicide Squad (2021), the second season is part of the DC Universe (DCU), which is a "soft reboot" of the DCEU. The season continues the story of jingoistic vigilante Chris Smith / Peacemaker, who finds an alternate dimension where his father and brother are still alive and the family is a highly regarded superhero team. It is set after the events of the "DCU" film Superman (2025). It is produced by DC Studios with James Gunn as showrunner.

John Cena stars as the titular character alongside Danielle Brooks, Freddie Stroma, Jennifer Holland, Steve Agee, Frank Grillo, and Robert Patrick. The season was ordered in February 2022, with Gunn set to write and direct all eight episodes. Filming was expected to begin in 2023, but work was put on hold when Gunn was made co-CEO of DC Studios and switched focus to Superman. The spin-off series Waller was then prioritized, but later delayed by the 2023 Hollywood labor disputes, and in March 2024 Gunn announced that the second season of Peacemaker would now release first. Some filming occurred the next month, taking place simultaneously with Superman at Trilith Studios in Atlanta, Georgia. Principal photography for the season took place from June to November.

The season premiered on the streaming service HBO Max on August 21, 2025, and consisted of eight episodes. The season received critical acclaim, with critics considering it superior to the first season and praising Gunn's writing, story, characters, emotional weight, themes, and Cena's performance; after Gunn announced there were no plans for a third season, reactions to the finale were polarizing.

== Episodes ==
No. overall	No. in season	Title	Directed by	Written by	Original release date
9	1	"The Ties That Grind"	James Gunn	James Gunn	August 21, 2025
One night, Chris Smith / Peacemaker encounters a door in the Quantum Unfolding Chamber (QUC) he uses as a storage area, in which he finds an alternate reality where his father Auggie Smith is alive and a superhero. Six months later, Chris is displeased that he has not been taken seriously as a superhero and failed to join the Justice Gang, while Emilia Harcourt has been unable to find work in other agencies due to Amanda Waller's influence. Acting A.R.G.U.S. director Rick Flag Sr. is distrustful of John Economos' report on Peacemaker, while Economos and Leota Adebayo are aware that Flag knows that Peacemaker killed his son Rick Flag Jr. (Note: As seen in the DC Extended Universe film The Suicide Squad (2021).) Chris returns to the alternate reality, where his brother Keith is shown to also be alive and a superhero. Chris eventually encounters his counterpart and a fight breaks out in the QUC, which ends with Peacemaker-2 being mortally wounded and dying in Chris' arms.
10	2	"A Man Is Only as Good as His Bird"	Greg Mottola	James Gunn	August 28, 2025
A.R.G.U.S. agent Langston Fleury is assigned as Economos' handler, as Flag Sr. grows suspicious of the latter. Adebayo visits Chris and informs him of Flag Sr. monitoring him, while suggesting he surrender the QUC to A.R.G.U.S. Adrian Chase meets with the pair and later helps Chris dispose of Peacemaker-2's corpse. While Chris and the 11th Street Kids hold a party on the rooftop of Harcourt's apartment, Fleury leads an A.R.G.U.S. squad to infiltrate Chris' residence, only to be assaulted by his bald eagle pet Eagly. A drunken Chris returns home and goes to the alternate universe once more, this time sending a text to this universe's Harcourt, who was previously in a relationship with Peacemaker-2.
11	3	"Another Rick Up My Sleeve"	Greg Mottola	James Gunn	September 4, 2025
Chris goes to meet Harcourt-2 at A.R.G.U.S. headquarters, where he learns that Flag Jr. is alive and dating Harcourt-2 in this universe. Harcourt-2 and Chris go on a walk, where Chris learns Harcourt-2 broke up with his counterpart because of his infidelity and unwillingness to commit to a serious relationship. Their conversation is interrupted by the Sons of Liberty, a paramilitary terrorist group who threatens to destroy a building with explosives. Chris sneaks into the building, kills the Sons, and deactivates the bomb. Later, after having an emotional conversation with Keith, Chris returns to his universe, unaware that A.R.G.U.S. agent Sasha Bordeaux has mobilized a team including Economos, Fleury, Judomaster, and eagle hunter Red St. Wild to raid Chris' home.
12	4	"Need I Say Door"	Peter Sollett	James Gunn	September 11, 2025
Economos tips Chris off about the incoming A.R.G.U.S. raid, prompting him to escape his home with Eagly and the gateway device for the QUC. Later, Economos knocks out St. Wild to prevent him from shooting Eagly, while Chris defeats Judomaster after encountering him in the woods. Chris calls Adebayo and explains the situation as both of them drive to a cabin in Settlers' Hill, where Chris sets up the device to transfer the QUC gateway to the cabin before A.R.G.U.S. could access it. Flag Sr. meets with Harcourt and offers her a chance to return to A.R.G.U.S., on the condition that she help him apprehend Peacemaker. Chris reveals to Adebayo his intention to move to the alternate dimension in spite of her protest, then later texts Harcourt asking to meet with her, unaware that she had reluctantly accepted Flag Sr.'s offer. As Chris goes to the meeting location, St. Wild performs a ritual that grants him a vision, allowing him to locate Eagly at the cabin.
13	5	"Back to the Suture"	Alethea Jones	James Gunn	September 18, 2025
At the meeting location, Harcourt tries to convince Chris to leave, denying that they had a connection after previously hooking up. However, not wanting Bordeaux to kill him, Harcourt knocks Chris unconscious herself. At A.R.G.U.S., Harcourt manages to get Economos to book Chris in jail to save his life as Flag Sr. brutally beats him up. Chris is let go and picked up by Adebayo, who takes him back to the cabin, unaware that Judomaster is following them on Flag Sr.'s order. Believing he does not belong in this universe, Chris decides to go to the alternate dimension permanently along with Eagly, who as the "Prime Eagle" summoned a horde of eagles to maul St. Wild to death while the 11th Street Kids were gone. Judomaster manages to sneak into the QUC before it closes. Later, as Adebayo reads Chris's farewell letter to the group, Harcourt resolves to bring him home.
14	6	"Ignorance Is Chris"	James Gunn	James Gunn	September 25, 2025
The 11th Street Kids set up the dimensional portal at Adrian's home and head to the other dimension to try and get Chris home. Harcourt is taken by Keith to A.R.G.U.S., where she meets Chris, while Adrian manages to find his dimensional counterpart. Adrian-2 reveals that Peacemaker-2 is his archnemesis and the reason why he joined the Sons of Liberty. Economos is found by Auggie and stabbed in the hand with a knife, causing him to confess the death of Peacemaker-2 to Auggie. Chris confesses his love for Harcourt, but does not want to leave the alternate universe. Harcourt-2 shows up and calls security on the original Harcourt after Chris discovers a U.S. flag with a Nazi swastika on it in place of stars. Adebayo goes on a walk, but is soon pursued by Keith and other residents, as racial minorities are persecuted in this world. Meanwhile, Flag Sr. visits Lex Luthor in Belle Reve and strikes a deal to move him to Van Kull Prison, in exchange for his help in locating Peacemaker and his dimensional portal.
15	7	"Like a Keith in the Night"	Alethea Jones	James Gunn	October 2, 2025
Chris and Harcourt escape A.R.G.U.S. before Auggie and Keith corner them and take them back to the Smiths' mansion. At the same time, Judomaster rescues Adebayo. Meanwhile, Flag Sr. and Bordeaux work with Sydney Happersen, a former LuthorCorp employee, to locate the dimensional rift at Adrian's house. Auggie and Keith interrogate Chris, but are interrupted by the cops looking for Chris. The two Vigilantes meet with Adebayo and Judomaster outside of the Smith house. Auggie allows Chris and his friends to leave the dimension, despite Keith's protests. Adrian sneaks up on and kills Auggie, to Chris and Keith's horror, and the Kids head to the portal. Keith pursues them and is severely injured by Eagly, Adrian, and Harcourt, before a traumatized Chris stops them from killing him and admits that he feels responsible for all of the deaths that occur around him. After fighting off cops, the Kids and Judomaster run back to their dimension and shut the portal down, but are confronted by A.R.G.U.S. waiting outside of Adrian's house. Chris hands over the device to Flag and gives himself up for arrest.
16	8	"Full Nelson"	James Gunn	James Gunn	October 9, 2025
One month earlier, Chris and Harcourt go out for a night that ends in a kiss that results in Harcourt leaving. In the present day, Chris is in prison, refusing to see the Kids. Meanwhile, A.R.G.U.S. investigates the doors in the QUC, where multiple A.R.G.U.S. agents are killed. Adebayo and Adrian bail out Chris, who takes Eagly and runs away, with none of the Kids knowing where he went. A.R.G.U.S manages to find a habitable dimension, which they name Salvation. Flag Sr. pitches the new dimension be used as a prison for metahumans to the government, which is approved. Disillusioned, Bordeaux reveals this to Harcourt before using Bordeaux's A.R.G.U.S. credentials to locate Peacemaker. The two then quit their jobs at A.R.G.U.S. together. The Kids head to the motel where Chris is staying and they tell him he is loved and appreciated. Harcourt tells Chris that the night on the boat was meaningful to her as well and the two begin dating. One week later, they all start a new agency, Checkmate, alongside Bordeaux, Fleury, and Judomaster. However, Chris is kidnapped and trapped in Salvation by Flag and A.R.G.U.S.

== Cast and characters ==
=== Main ===
- John Cena as Chris Smith / Peacemaker: A jingoistic vigilante who believes in achieving peace at any cost. Cena also portrays an alternate version of Peacemaker from another reality, dubbed "Earth-2" by showrunner James Gunn, after the long-running alternate version of Earth as seen in DC Comics' multiverse. Myles Benson portrays a younger Chris in a flashback.
- Danielle Brooks as Leota Adebayo: The daughter of former A.R.G.U.S. director Amanda Waller and a member of the 11th Street Kids.
- Freddie Stroma as Adrian Chase / Vigilante: A self-proclaimed crimefighter who looks up to Peacemaker like an older brother. Stroma also portrays an alternate version of Vigilante from Earth-2, who is virtually identical in mannerisms to him except he considers Peacemaker-2 his arch-nemesis as a member of the Sons of Liberty. Kellen Boyle serves as the acting double for Vigilante in scenes where both Vigilantes interact with each other.
- Jennifer Holland as Emilia Harcourt: A member of Team Peacemaker, and former A.R.G.U.S. agent. Holland also portrays an alternate version of Harcourt from Earth-2, who was previously in a relationship with Peacemaker-2.
- Steve Agee as John Economos: An A.R.G.U.S. agent who previously provided tactical support for Team Peacemaker. Following the events of the first season, Economos now continues to work under Rick Flag Sr. to monitor Peacemaker's activities.
- Frank Grillo as Rick Flag Sr.: The new acting director of A.R.G.U.S. and the father of Suicide Squad leader Rick Flag Jr. Flag Sr. is angry about the death of his son at the hands of Peacemaker in the film The Suicide Squad (2021), and views Peacemaker as a threat because of this. Gunn said Flag Sr. and Peacemaker have "unfinished business to take care of", Gunn enjoyed evolving the character in the DC Universe (DCU) from his introduction as a protagonist in the animated series Creature Commandos (2024–present). Flag Sr. has dark hair in the season, rather than grey hair as in Creature Commandos, because Grillo was filming the series Tulsa King (2022–present) simultaneously with Peacemaker and Gunn felt temporary hair dye would not look good. His in-universe explanation was that Flag Sr. dyed his hair due to vanity and ego.
- Robert Patrick as Auggie Smith / Blue Dragon: An alternate heroic variant from Earth-2 of Peacemaker's white supremacist father, the White Dragon, who was killed by him in the first season. Patrick also portrays the original Auggie in a flashback.

=== Recurring ===
- David Denman as Keith Smith / Captain Triumph: Peacemaker's brother who is still alive on Earth-2, and is part of the "Top Trio" team as a superhero alongside him and Auggie. Bryson Haney portrays a younger Keith from the original timeline in a flashback, replacing Liam Hughes who previously portrayed young Keith in the first season.
- Sol Rodríguez as Sasha Bordeaux: An A.R.G.U.S. agent who is outfitted with cybernetic enhancements after a near-fatal accident.
- Tim Meadows as Langston Fleury: An A.R.G.U.S. agent assigned by Bordeaux to supervise Economos with monitoring Peacemaker.
- Reinaldo Faberlle as Vega: An A.R.G.U.S. agent who raids Peacemaker's home.
- Brandon Stanley as Kline: An A.R.G.U.S. agent who raids Peacemaker's home.
- Nhut Le as Rip Jagger / Judomaster: A martial artist who previously crossed paths with the 11th Street Kids, and is now hired by A.R.G.U.S. to apprehend Peacemaker
- Michael Rooker as Red St. Wild: The world's foremost eagle hunter who is hired by A.R.G.U.S. to kill Eagly

=== Guest ===
- Sean Gunn as Maxwell Lord: The owner of LordTech and financial backer of the superhero group Justice Gang. James Gunn described Lord as a "morally grey" character inspired by his earlier comic appearances as he wanted to avoid an adaptation of Lord's supervillain identity that is shown in the current comics for future DCU appearances.
- Isabela Merced as Kendra Saunders / Hawkgirl: A superhero with wings and various melee weapons who is a Justice Gang member
- Nathan Fillion as Guy Gardner / Green Lantern: An abrasive galactic peacekeeper in the Green Lantern Corps and a Justice Gang member
- Elizabeth Ludlow as Keeya Adebayo: Leota's ex-wife
- Nicholas Hoult as Lex Luthor: The incarcerated former CEO of LuthorCorp and the arch-nemesis of Superman
- Stephen Blackehart as Sydney Happersen: An incarcerated employee of LuthorCorp
- Lochlyn Munro as Larry Fitzgibbon: The Earth-2 variant of an Evergreen police detective who was killed and possessed by a Butterfly alien during the first season
- Terence Rosemore as Otis Berg: A LuthorCorp employee
- James Hiroyuki Liao as General Stephen Mori: the U.S. Secretary of Defense
- Matthew and Gunnar Nelson as themselves

Joel Kinnaman appears uncredited as Rick Flag Jr., the former field commander of Task Force X killed by Peacemaker on Corto Maltese during "Project Starfish". Kinnaman also portrays an alternate Flag Jr. who works for A.R.G.U.S. on Earth-2 and is dating that world's Harcourt. Additionally, Michael Ian Black reprises his role from the DCU film Superman (2025) as talk show host Cleavis Thornwaite. Brey Noelle briefly appears as Jaina Hudson / White Rabbit, a superhero who interviewed with the Justice Gang and was rejected. Anissa Matlock portrays A.R.G.U.S. agent Angler, who raids Peacemaker's home, Taylor St. Clair portrays Vigilante's mother, Mrs. Chase, and Dorian Kingi portrays an alien (credited as the "Kyphotic Alien") who frequently encounters Peacemaker in the Quantum Unfolding Chamber. Richard Galinson and Savannah Koningen serve as the alien's puppeteers. Peacemaker's pet bald eagle, Eagly, returns from the first season, voiced by Dee Bradley Baker. The rock band Foxy Shazam, who performs the season's opening theme song "Oh Lord", also appears as themselves.

== Production ==
=== Development ===
James Gunn, creator and showrunner of the DC Extended Universe (DCEU) series Peacemaker, said in August 2021 that he wanted to make a second season and was committed to doing so if the series was renewed. He reiterated this after the first season premiered in January 2022, despite he and star John Cena not yet having deals to return for a second season and Gunn wanting to take a break after a busy few years. Gunn did not formally agree to make a second season until he had worked out what he wanted the overall character arcs to be, as he and Cena did not want to agree to something that they would not love to make. Streaming service HBO Max officially announced the second season in February 2022, with Gunn set to write and direct all episodes. He said it would explore the repercussions, good and bad, of the first season's events.

Discovery, Inc. and Warner Bros.' parent company WarnerMedia merged in April 2022 to become Warner Bros. Discovery (WBD), led by president and CEO David Zaslav. The new company was expected to restructure DC Entertainment and Zaslav began searching for an equivalent to Marvel Studios president Kevin Feige to lead the new subsidiary. After the surprise cancellation of DC's Batgirl film by WBD in August, Gunn said the second season of Peacemaker was "safe", and would begin filming in 2023. Gunn and producer Peter Safran were announced as the co-chairs and co-CEOs of the newly formed DC Studios at the end of October 2022. A week after starting their new roles, the pair had begun working with a group of writers to develop an eight-to-ten-year plan for a new DC Universe (DCU) that would be a "soft reboot" of the DCEU. Gunn and Safran said some cast members would return from their film The Suicide Squad (2021) and the first season of Peacemaker in the DCU, and a "rough memory" of those events would remain in the new universe. Because Gunn was busy with his new responsibilities, the second season of Peacemaker was put on hold by January 2023. In February, Gunn said the series was delayed by his work on the first DCU film, Superman (2025), but it was not canceled and would be made after the spin-off series Waller. He said Peacemaker's second season was his next project after Superman, and would be part of the DCU's Chapter One: Gods and Monsters slate of content.

Gunn said in October 2023 that the season would address its change from the DCEU continuity to the DCU continuity. He stated that the first season was not canon to the DCU, but later clarified that most of the first season's events are canon to the DCU except for specific moments such as the appearance of the DCEU's Justice League. In March 2024, Gunn revealed that Waller had been delayed by the 2023 Hollywood labor disputes and the second season of Peacemaker would now be made first. Production was set to take place simultaneously with Superman later in 2024, in the interest of getting the season ready as soon as possible, so Gunn was no longer able to direct all of the episodes. He ultimately directed three episodes, including the first, with Greg Mottola, Peter Sollett, and Alethea Jones also directing.

=== Writing ===
Gunn was writing the season by October 2023, following the conclusion of the 2023 Writers Guild of America strike, and he finished writing all eight episodes by early February 2024. He said the season was more about Chris Smith, referring to Peacemaker's real name, and the interconnectivity between the characters and their personal lives. Gunn initially intended to write the second season of Peacemaker before Superman, but plans changed for him once he took the reins of DC Studios, with the pocket universe storyline from that film playing a role in his story for the season. An initial rough outline for the season Gunn wrote based on Philip Roth's novel The Counterlife (1986) had white supremacist superheroes going after the titular character for killing his father August "Auggie" Smith / White Dragon due to him being their comrade, as Gunn intended for Peacemaker to really deal with the ramifications of his actions and face the emotional reality of the demons he discovered in the first season, but Gunn ultimately felt that the draft played a little bit too much like that season and he wanted to turn the story on its heels, leading him to come up with an alternate reality where Peacemaker finds out a counterpart of his who is better than him in every seemingly way, forcing him into an emotional standpoint to face his ghosts from the past while mixed in a potent love story. It is set one month after the events of Superman. Gunn later said the season acted as a prequel to Superman's follow-up film, Man of Tomorrow (2027), and would directly lead into the latter's events, particularly viewing Nicholas Hoult's cameo appearance as Lex Luthor in the sixth episode as a pivotal franchise moment that would lead up to that film.

The season addresses how the show's first season fits into the DCU via a recap at the start of the season, which notably retcons the DCEU's Justice League who appeared in "It's Cow or Never" by replacing them with the Justice Gang alongside Superman and Supergirl, all of whom debuted in Superman (2025). Gunn said that within the DCU, the first season as recapped still took place before the events of Superman.

A plot twist in the sixth episode reveals that the alternate dimension Peacemaker goes to is a world ruled by Nazis, seemingly based on Earth-X from the comics. Though Gunn noted the similarities to the comic book version, he clarified that he based the idea of this universe on Philip K. Dick's novel The Man in the High Castle (1962).

=== Casting ===
John Cena confirmed that he would be returning as Chris Smith / Peacemaker for the second season when it was officially ordered in February 2022. In July 2023, Gunn said Freddie Stroma would reprise his first-season role as Adrian Chase / Vigilante in the DCU. Also reprising their roles from the first season are Danielle Brooks as Leota Adebayo, Jennifer Holland as Emilia Harcourt, Steve Agee as John Economos, Robert Patrick as Peacemaker's father Auggie Smith / White Dragon, and Nhut Le as Rip Jagger / Judomaster. Gunn said Judomaster had a bigger role in the second season.

In April 2023, when announcing the cast of the DCU animated series Creature Commandos (2024–present), Gunn said there were plans for some of the voice actors to reprise their roles in live-action DCU projects. He specifically highlighted Frank Grillo's casting as Rick Flag Sr. for all DCU media. In May 2024, Gunn announced that Grillo would be reprising his role as Flag Sr. in the second season of Peacemaker. Sol Rodríguez, David Denman, and Tim Meadows were cast the following month, with Rodríguez portraying Sasha Bordeaux and Meadows cast as Langston Fleury. Fleury was one of the characters Gunn considered among the hardest he ever had to cast, stating that Meadows was offered and ultimately signed to portray after "hundreds" of actors auditioned for the role. Sollett indicated in July that Joel Kinnaman was reprising his role as Rick Flag Jr. from The Suicide Squad, but Kinnaman said he would not appear. Kinnaman ultimately makes an uncredited cameo appearance as both Rick Flag Jr. in the primary universe and a separate counterpart on "Earth-2" during the third episode. In November, Gunn revealed that Anissa Matlock, Taylor St. Clair, Dorian Kingi, and Brandon Stanley were part of the cast.

A teaser trailer, released in May 2025, revealed that Isabela Merced, Nathan Fillion, and Sean Gunn were reprising their respective roles as Kendra Saunders / Hawkgirl, Guy Gardner / Green Lantern, and Maxwell Lord from Superman. It also revealed that Michael Rooker would appear, as an original character named Red St. Wild. Rooker previously had small roles in The Suicide Squad and Creature Commandos. Gunn later revealed that another actor had originally been cast as Red St. Wild and had filmed a majority of the character's scenes before it was decided it was not "work[ing] out for various reasons", with Gunn then approaching Rooker to take over the role. Another trailer, released in August, further revealed that Terence Rosemore, Stephen Blackehart, and James Hiroyuki Liao would be reprising their respective roles as Otis Berg, Sydney Happersen, and General Mori from Superman. After the season finale, Gunn revealed that he had conversations with Ryan Reynolds about reprising his role of Wade Wilson / Deadpool from the X-Men film series and the Marvel Cinematic Universe (MCU) in the Quantum Unfolding Chamber sequence of the eight episode, but ultimately didn't go through the idea due to "some pretty, pretty big hoops" to realize it despite Reynolds' wishes to make the scene. Gunn later jokingly regretted commenting about the abandoned concept as he assumed everyone would talk about it.

=== Filming ===
Gunn said in March 2024 that filming would begin later that year, simultaneously with production on Superman, at Trilith Studios in Atlanta, Georgia. Filming began on April 13, with Gunn doing a "pre-shoot" on a Saturday to work around his Superman filming commitments. He was directing three of the episodes and had hired three other directors for the season: Greg Mottola, who directed the second and third episodes; Sollett, who directed the fourth episode; and Alethea Jones, who directed multiple episodes. Sam McCurdy was the cinematographer. Principal photography began on June 13, and wrapped on November 25.

=== Title sequence ===
After the first season's opening title sequence received positive responses, Gunn said they wanted to "up [their] game" for the second season. Charissa Barton returned to choreograph the second season's title sequence. Gunn considered various music choices for the sequence, including reusing the first season's title song "Do Ya Wanna Taste It" by Wig Wam, before settling on a new song that he said aligned with the season's focus on Chris Smith over Peacemaker. The song was revealed in July 2025 to be "Oh Lord" by Foxy Shazam.

== Marketing ==
Cena debuted the first footage from the season during TNT Sports's Inside the NBA in May 2025. A teaser trailer was released soon after, featuring the song "Oh Lord" by Foxy Shazam. Discussion of the teaser focused on Peacemaker going on the run from A.R.G.U.S. for killing Rick Flag Jr. and how the series would explain the change in setting from the DCEU to the DCU. Michael Walsh at Nerdist highlighted the teaser's reveal of another version of Peacemaker who appears to be from an alternate universe within the DC Multiverse, questioning whether this is related to the change in continuity. Commentators had similar thoughts on another trailer that was released in theaters, attached to screenings of Superman. Gunn soon clarified that the different universes explored in the season are separate from how it addresses the change in setting from the DCEU to the DCU. He further clarified this throughout Peacemaker: The Official Podcast with James Gunn, highlighting specific aspects of each episode of the first season that were and were not canon in the DCU.

== Release ==
The season premiered on HBO Max on August 21, 2025.

== Reception ==
On the review aggregator website Rotten Tomatoes, 94% of 149 critics' reviews are positive. The website's consensus reads: "Peacemaker's second season goes multidimensional while still maintaining a singular focus on emotional stakes, seamlessly transporting this outrageous antihero into a fresh cinematic universe." Metacritic, which uses a weighted average, assigned the season a score of 78 out of 100, based on 18 critics, indicating "generally favorable" reviews. Critics found the season to be better than the first, calling it "just as dark, brutal, and silly" but more grounded, character focused, and heartwarming, with praise for Cena's performance and the wider cast.
