= The Ties That Grind =

- Peacemaker episode
- Episode no.: Season 2 Episode 1
- Directed by: James Gunn
- Written by: James Gunn
- Cinematography by: Sam McCurdy
- Editing by: Gregg Featherman
- Original air date: August 21, 2025
- Running time: 45 minutes

Guest appearances
- Sean Gunn as Maxwell Lord; Nathan Fillion as Guy Gardner; Isabela Merced as Hawkgirl

Episode chronology
← Previous "It's Cow or Never"	Next → "A Man Is Only as Good as His Bird"
- Peacemaker season 2

"The Ties That Grind" is the first episode of the second season of the American television series Peacemaker. It is the ninth overall episode of the series, and was written and directed by series creator James Gunn. It originally aired on HBO Max on August 21, 2025.

Unlike the first season, which was set in the DC Extended Universe (DCEU), this season is set in the DC Universe (DCU), a "soft reboot" of the DCEU, and takes place after the events of Superman, with Chris Smith / Peacemaker confronting his inner demons as he meets an alternate version of himself.

The episode received highly positive reviews from critics, who praised Gunn's writing, character development, and set-up for the new DC Universe.

== Plot ==
One night, Chris Smith / Peacemaker is awakened by Eagly, who asks him to take him outside. Chris instead takes him to the Quantum Unfolding Chamber (QUC), a near-infinite storage area that also connects to other universes in his home. Eagly flies to a copy of their universe's door, leading to an alternate universe where Chris and his deceased father Auggie are beloved superheroes. When an alive Auggie greets him, he quickly leaves back to the chamber.

Six months later, Chris keeps in touch with his team, but feels disappointed that he is still not perceived as a hero. He applies to join the Justice Gang, but is insulted and dismissed for his violent past. He later visits Emilia Harcourt, who has been turned down by many government agencies, supposedly due to Amanda Waller's influence. Chris mentions a past encounter between the two, but Harcourt calls it a mistake, causing him to leave upset. At his home, he smokes weed, does cocaine, and hosts an orgy, which he does not participate in himself. Disillusioned, Chris once again enters the QUC.

Meanwhile, John Economos is surveilling Peacemaker's house and receives a warning, similar to a prior incident involving Lex Luthor. (Note: As depicted in the film Superman (2025)) A.R.G.U.S. agent Sasha Bordeaux reports this to Rick Flag Sr., who is now the acting director of A.R.G.U.S. Not trusting Economos to truthfully report on Peacemaker, Flag orders a new agent brought in and heightens the case's priority. While discussing the matter with Leota Adebayo, Economos explains that Flag Sr. is aware that Peacemaker killed his son, (Note: As seen in the DC Extended Universe film The Suicide Squad (2021)) which is why he is monitoring him. Meanwhile, Harcourt gets into a brutal fight at a bar with the patrons; though she initially has the upper hand, she is quickly overpowered and kicked out.

Through the chamber, Chris returns to the universe where he had previously encountered an alternate Auggie; he finds that his brother Keith is still alive and that they, in this universe, form a superhero trio with Auggie. While drinking with them, Chris learns that he used to date Harcourt in this universe. Later, he is confronted by Peacemaker 2, the alternate universe version of himself. Chris flees back to the chamber, but Peacemaker 2 chases and brutally attacks him. Before Peacemaker 2 can kill him, Chris activates Peacemaker 2's jetpack, causing him to be impaled in the ceiling before dying in Chris's arms.

== Production ==
=== Development ===
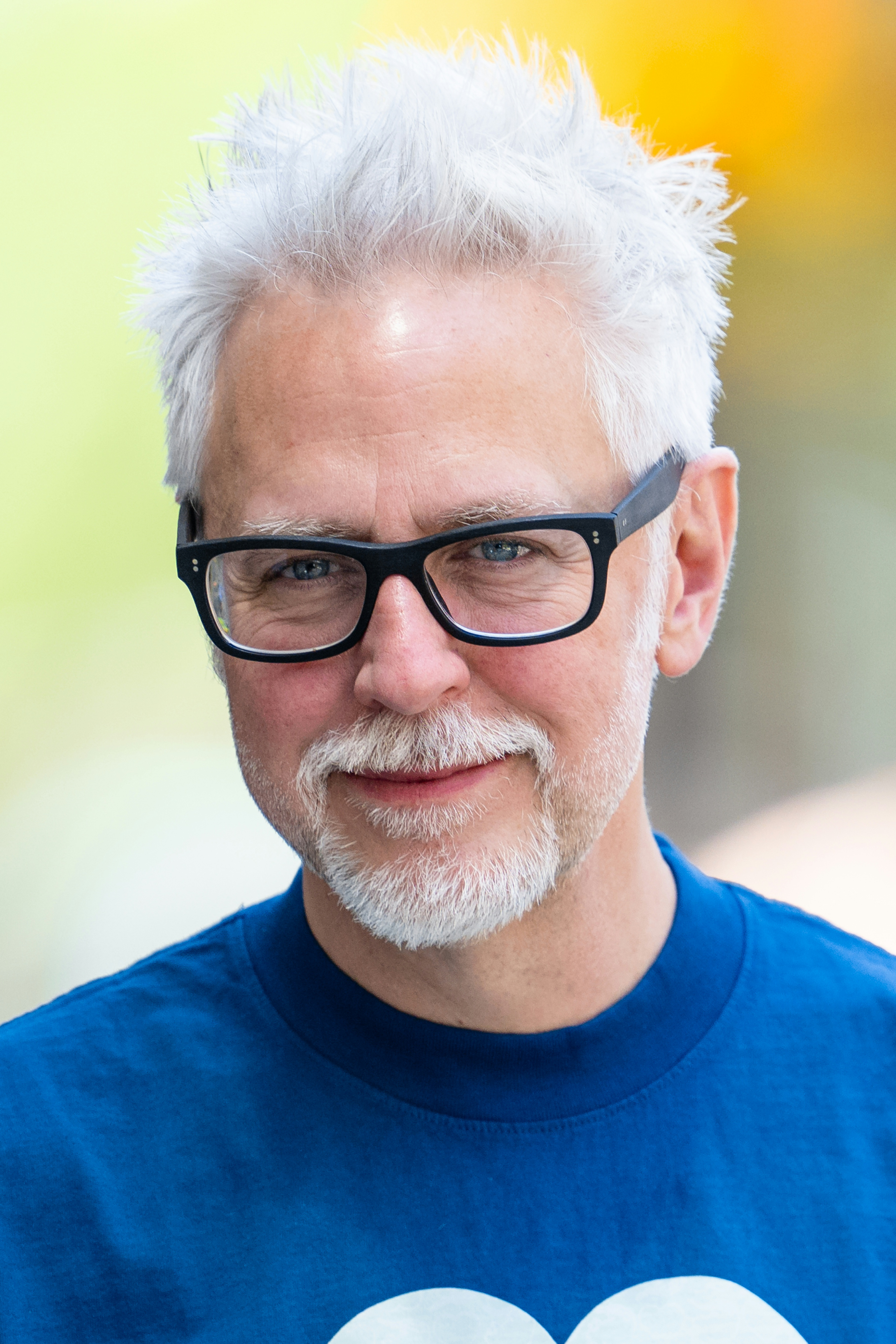
Series creator James Gunn wrote and directed the episode.

In February 2022, when Peacemaker was renewed for a second season, James Gunn was confirmed to write all episodes. It marked Gunn's ninth writing credit, and sixth directing credit.

=== Writing ===
A recap sequence, detailing events of the first season, retcons the ending of the first-season finale "It's Cow or Never" by changing the silhouettes of the Justice League to Clark Kent / Superman, Kara Zor-El / Supergirl, Michael Holt / Mister Terrific, Guy Gardner / Green Lantern, and Kendra Saunders / Hawkgirl; Nathan Fillion and Isabela Merced reprise their roles as the latter two, respectively, from the film Superman (2025). Gunn commented, "Basically, what you saw last season was all accurate. But maybe there are a couple of things that are not so accurate and one of those is there's no Justice League, obviously."

For the scene where Gardner, Saunders, and Maxwell Lord (portrayed by Sean Gunn) interview Smith, Gunn explained, "We have the two Justice Gang members and not Mr. Terrific [Edi Gathegi] because Mr. Terrific is too together and kind of too nice for those three people. Those three people are much meaner, so we needed three people that would pick on Peacemaker in that scene, and that was perfect."

Gunn said that while there were "some net positives" for the characters, Harcourt would be the character who would struggle the most. He explained, "Harcourt is worse off. Her job was everything to her. It's all she's ever done. The only people that mattered to her were the soldiers that walked alongside her, and she's lost that. So she is a freaking mess." For the bar fight sequence, Jennifer Holland performed most of her stunts, with Gunn deeming her little smile at the end as one of his favorite things of the episode.

=== Filming ===
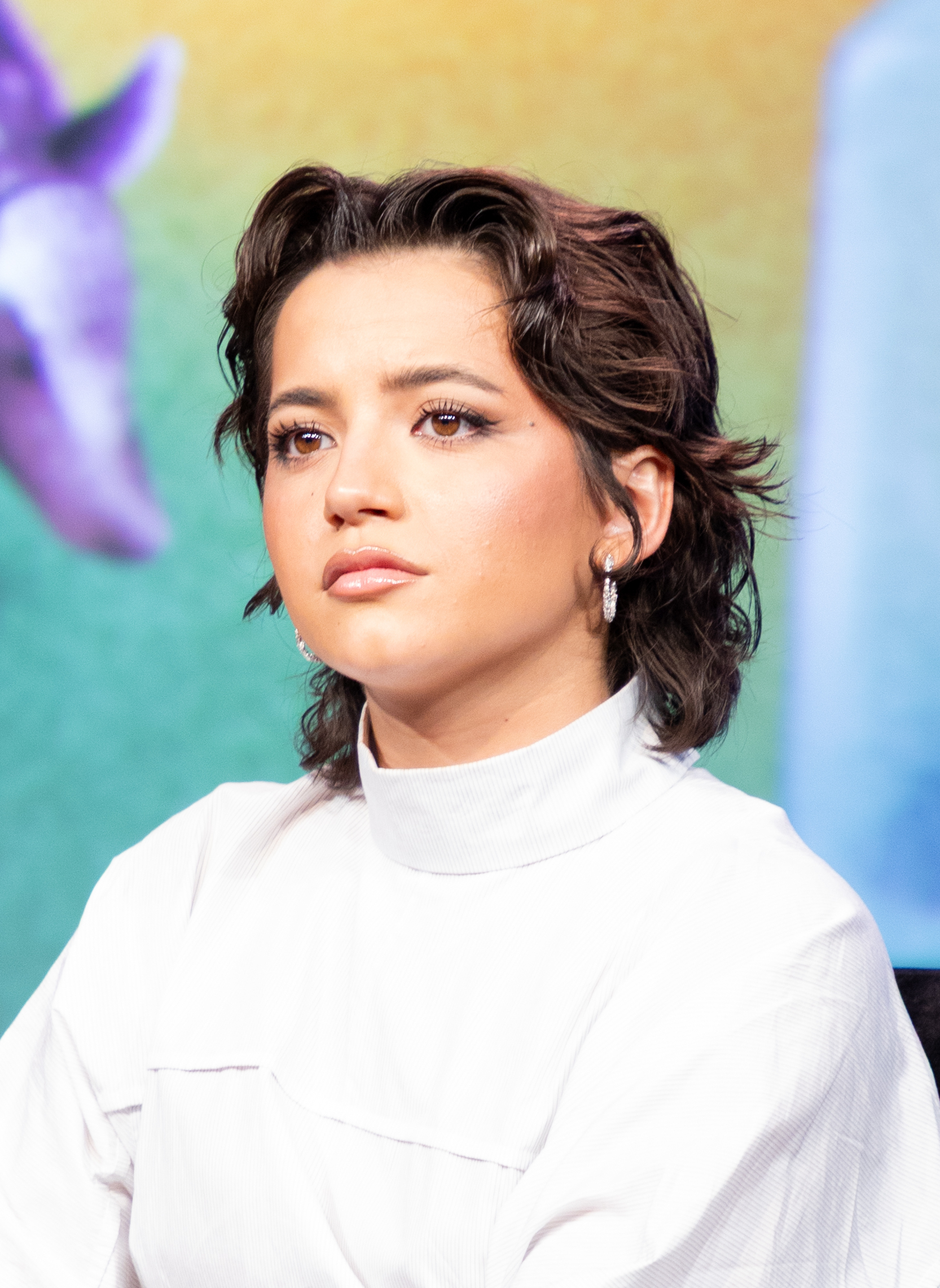
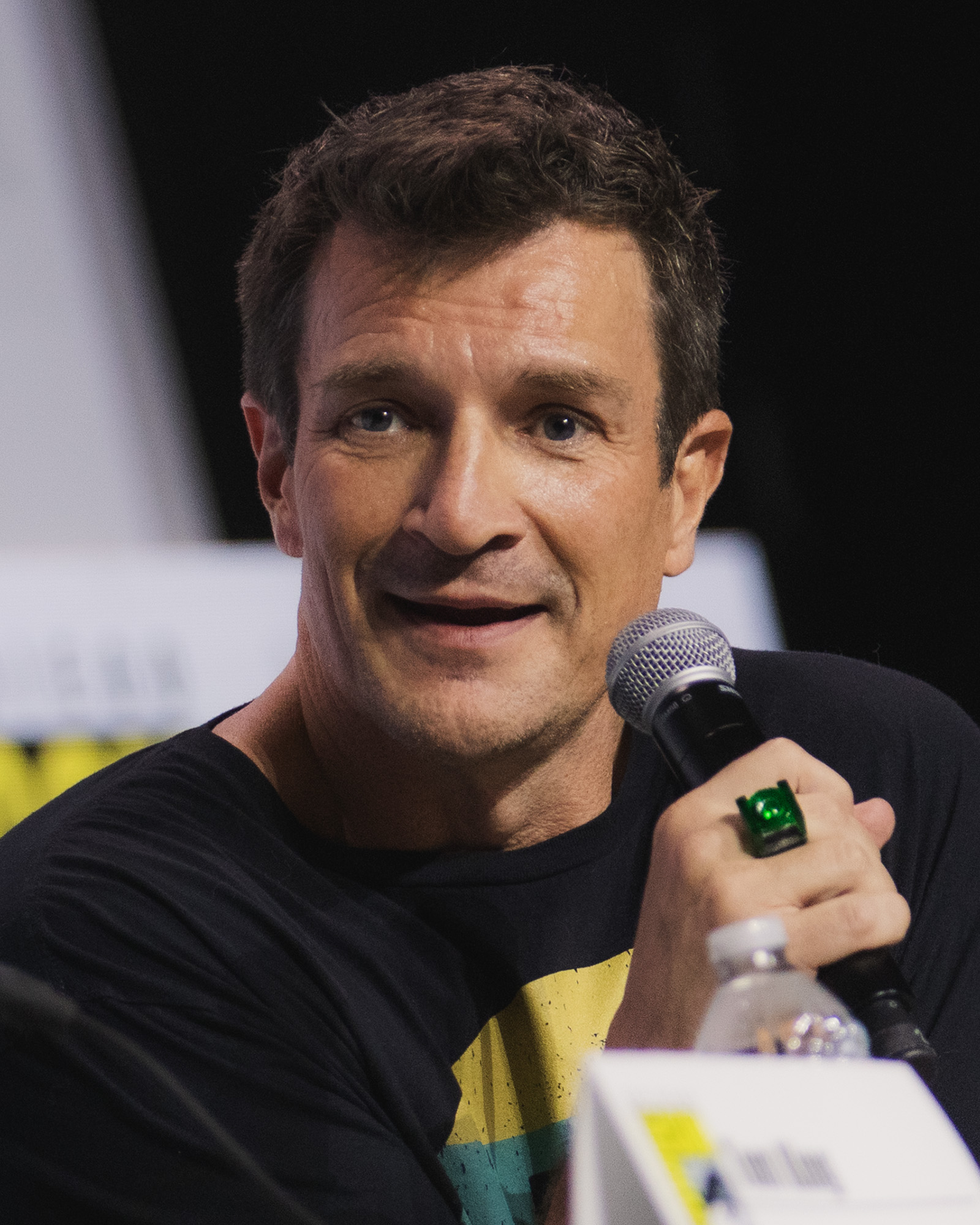
Isabela Merced (left) and Nathan Fillion (right) appear in the episode as their respective characters in the DC Universe (DCU), marking an overhaul from the show's DC Extended Universe (DCEU) roots.

Smith's interview with the Justice Gang was the first scene filmed for the season, and it was filmed while Gunn was directing Superman. Due to time constraints, the rest of the episode was not filmed until the second and third episode wrapped filming.

The episode also included a graphic scene depicting an orgy in Smith's house. Gunn explained that the scene was used to reflect Smith's new personality, "We hear a lot about how sexually debaucherous Chris is in the first season, and in this episode, we see a little hint of that. He uses sex and drugs to escape his feelings, and that's what he's doing in this episode. He's sort of relapsing, in a way. He's gotten better, he's grown, he's more vulnerable, and he's sort of backtracking in that moment." To help ease things for the extras involved in the scene, the set was closed on the days of filming. Steve Agee said that his character's reaction was genuine as it was the first time he saw the orgy, deeming it "the most graphic day I've ever had on a set." He said that while his script said "John Economos sneaks up to the house and looks in the window, and there's this orgy happening", he was not told how explicit it would be. He added, "I've done horror movies and stuff where there's blood, but this is the first time, as a comedic actor — I don't get to see stuff like that very often. Slash ever."

=== Music ===
After the first season's opening title sequence received positive responses, Gunn said they wanted to "up [their] game" for the second season. Charissa Barton returned to choreograph the second season's title sequence. Gunn considered various music choices for the sequence, including reusing the first season's title song "Do Ya Wanna Taste It" by Wig Wam, before settling on a new song that he said aligned with the season's focus on Chris Smith over Peacemaker. The song was revealed in July 2025 to be "Oh Lord" by Foxy Shazam.

Gunn explained that the dance needed to change "because we killed everybody in Season 1." He considered scenarios over whether to change the dance or the song itself, when he listened to "Oh Lord". He subsequently decided that the song fit the series, "[Foxy Shazam] are literally my favorite band. But I think that the lyrics are very much about what happens in Season 2. I think that in the same way ‘Do Ya Wanna Taste It’ really captured the flavor, both the light and the dark sides of Season 1, the same is true of ‘Oh Lord."

== Reception ==
"The Ties That Grind" received highly positive reviews from critics. Jarrod Jones of The A.V. Club gave the episode a "B+" grade and wrote, "As a second-season premiere for a rowdy superhero series, "The Ties That Grind" is a surprisingly lachrymose and tidy table-setter. Gunn indulges his usual shaggy-dog digressions — the Justice Gang sequence overstays its welcome — but the episode's function is primarily restorative, gathering its scattered, damaged cast and resituating them before the dramatic weight of Chris's reality-shifting discovery at the end of the episode detonates all over the place."

Scott Meslow of Vulture gave the episode a 3 star rating out of 5 and wrote, "Chris may have spent season one attempting to recover from guilt over accidentally killing his own brother as an adolescent, but this parallel universe offers a karmic shortcut: a world in which that formative trauma didn’t happen at all."

Kendall Myers of Collider gave the episode an 8 out of 10 rating and wrote, "With new enemies, multiverse shenanigans, and all the characters seemingly at a personal low, Peacemaker Season 2 promises to be eventful, to say the least." Joe George of Den of Geek wrote, "Those really worried about how the past DCU connects to the current DCU can come up with their own headcanon. Stan Lee used to hand out "No Prizes" to readers who wrote in with the best explanation for continuity errors in Marvel Comics. But it's much better to let Gunn and other creatives focus on the stuff that matters, the characters and the emotions they experience as they kill alien butterflies and travel across realities."

Eric Francisco of Esquire wrote, "Peacemaker season 2, episode 1 is a lot of table-setting for what is bound to be an increasingly complicated and increasingly violent season. And that's just how we like it. Its twist on the multiverse is a welcome one, too. As audiences have shown fatigue to the superhero genre and its unwieldy science fiction nonsense, Peacemaker is keeping things close to its title antihero's chest, quite literally." Felipe Rangel of Screen Rant wrote, "There is a lot of room for season 2 to beat the first in its exploration of its characters, and after seeing Peacemaker and Jennifer Holland's Emilia Harcourt struggle in the season premiere, their journeys are set up perfectly. Peacemaker meeting his alternate self and killing him was shocking, and it sets up a huge interdimensional mess that I can't wait to see more of."

Tasha Robinson of Polygon wrote, "Season 1 sometimes felt like Chris was recognizing the treadmill he was on, and escaping it. Season 2's opening act drops him right back on it." Paul Dailly of TV Fanatic gave the episode a 3.5 star rating out of 5 and wrote, "As far as premieres go, this wasn't the adrenaline shot many fans may have hoped for after such a long wait. Instead, it was a quieter, more contemplative entry that set the table for bigger stories to come."
