= It's Cow or Never =

- Peacemaker episode
- Episode no.: Season 1 Episode 8
- Directed by: James Gunn
- Written by: James Gunn
- Cinematography by: Sam McCurdy
- Editing by: Fred Raskin; Greg D'Auria
- Original air date: February 17, 2022
- Running time: 44 minutes

Guest appearances
- Jason Momoa as Arthur Curry / Aquaman (uncredited); Ezra Miller as Barry Allen / The Flash (uncredited); Viola Davis as Amanda Waller (uncredited)

Episode chronology
← Previous "Stop Dragon My Heart Around"	Next → "The Ties That Grind"
- Peacemaker season 1

"It's Cow or Never" is the eighth episode and first season finale of the American black comedy superhero drama television series Peacemaker, a spin-off from the 2021 film The Suicide Squad. The episode was written and directed by series creator James Gunn. It originally aired on HBO Max on February 17, 2022.

The series is set after the events of The Suicide Squad, and follows Chris Smith / Peacemaker. Smith returns to his home but is forced to work with A.R.G.U.S. agents on a classified operation only known as "Project Butterfly". Smith also has to deal with his personal demons, including feeling haunted by memories of people he killed for "peace". In the episode, the team takes a last stand in order to stop the Butterflies from transporting their main supply.

The episode received critical acclaim, with critics praising Gunn's directing, writing, performances, emotional tone, action sequences, soundtrack, character development and surprises.

== Plot ==
Chris Smith / Peacemaker defends his killings as meant to prevent future meaningless deaths, while Leota Adebayo advises him to not define himself by his accidental killing of his brother. The team reaches Coverdale Ranch, aiming to kill the Butterflies' only food source, a 'Cow', before the Butterflies teleport it away to hide it. Adebayo calls her mother and asks her to call for backup, but is told no one can come immediately.

John Economos is sent to plant Peacemaker's sonic boom helmet at the barn as the Butterflies would not recognize him. As he enters the barn, he sees the gigantic Cow alien underground below the barn. The Butterflies discover the helmet and tackle Economos, but Adebayo activates it like a bomb, collapsing the barn and distracting the Butterflies. Peacemaker, Harcourt and Adrian Chase / Vigilante charge, killing many attacking Butterflies, including Butterfly-Fitzgibbon. Peacemaker follows Butterfly-Song underground, while Vigilante and Harcourt are wounded. Economos accidentally injures himself while running back to the others. Adebayo enters the fight, killing Butterflies to save Harcourt, before moving underground.

Needing Peacemaker to help operate the equipment to teleport the Cow, Butterfly-Song saves him from rubble. Adebayo activates Peacemaker's human torpedo helmet, but misses Butterfly-Song and incapacitates herself. Butterfly-Song asks for Peacemaker's help, claiming that humanity was dooming Earth by prioritizing profit over survival, but the Butterflies' leadership can save humanity and Earth. Peacemaker rejects this, reactivating the human torpedo helmet to launch Adebayo into the Cow, killing it. He shoots Song's body but spares Goff's Butterfly. Peacemaker berates the Justice League for showing up late as the team leaves the scene to rush to the hospital. (Note: In the show's second season, which retroactively incorporates the series into the continuity of the new DC Universe (DCU) franchise, the scene is retconned to feature the Justice Gang, Superman, and Supergirl.)

Harcourt, Vigilante and Economos are hospitalized. Peacemaker reconciles with Adebayo, telling her that he rejected the Butterflies to protect his teammates from them, but wonders if he doomed humanity. In a press conference, Adebayo clears Peacemaker and Vigilante's names, exposing Project Butterfly, Task Force X, and Waller's leadership of both. Harcourt is touched when Peacemaker waits at the hospital until she awakens. Later, Adebayo reunites with her wife Keeya; Economos returns to work at Belle Reve Penitentiary; Judomaster cries seeing the carnage at Coverdale Ranch; Peacemaker and Vigilante have fun with explosives in the woods; and a recovering Harcourt begins physical therapy. Goff's Butterfly visits Peacemaker at his trailer home; he feeds it with the last of his amber liquid, while he hallucinates Auggie's presence.

== Production ==
=== Development ===
The episode originally served as a series finale, due to the "miniseries" status of Peacemaker. Jennifer Holland explained that series creator James Gunn approached the season as a complete story, without knowing for certain if there would be a second season. The day before the airing, HBO Max announced that the series would be renewed for a second season.

=== Writing ===
On the decision to have Christopher Smith / Peacemaker kill Sophie despite evidence of the Butterflies that their planet is heading to perdition, Gunn said that he viewed the moment as letting go of the person that his father made him to be. He further explained "I see Peacemaker as being ignorant of scientific and cultural issues. I don't think he has a lot of ideals about politics. I think he has just followed the crowd he's been with. But in other ways, he is laudable because he isn't a racist. He doesn't subscribe to what his father subscribes to, or what he believes with his own sexuality, with the type of music he listens to, and I don't think he puts a lot of faith in his father's belief system. He just wants his father's love. The butterfly is talking about people that just don't really pay attention; you follow, and you read a meme on Facebook and believe it's true, because that meme says that masks hurt us. It's a ludicrous thing to believe, and it makes no sense whatsoever, but they believe it because they read a meme".

Many endings were considered for the episode. One of these included Smith joining the Butterflies, but Gunn discarded the idea, stating "it's a choice between the lives of these people he's come to love and this choice to stick with his old way of doing things." Gunn did not intend for Emilia Harcourt and Adrian Chase to die in the episode, explaining "I think it just seems like the better story overall for me".

Questioned on Judomaster's true alliance, Gunn said that the character has no friends or allies in the series. One of the goals for the episode included having it clear that he had a bigger role in the future, stating "He's revealed that he does have good intentions at the end. We see him sad at the end. He does care about something. He's not just an evil little jerk. He's just a little jerk".

=== Casting ===
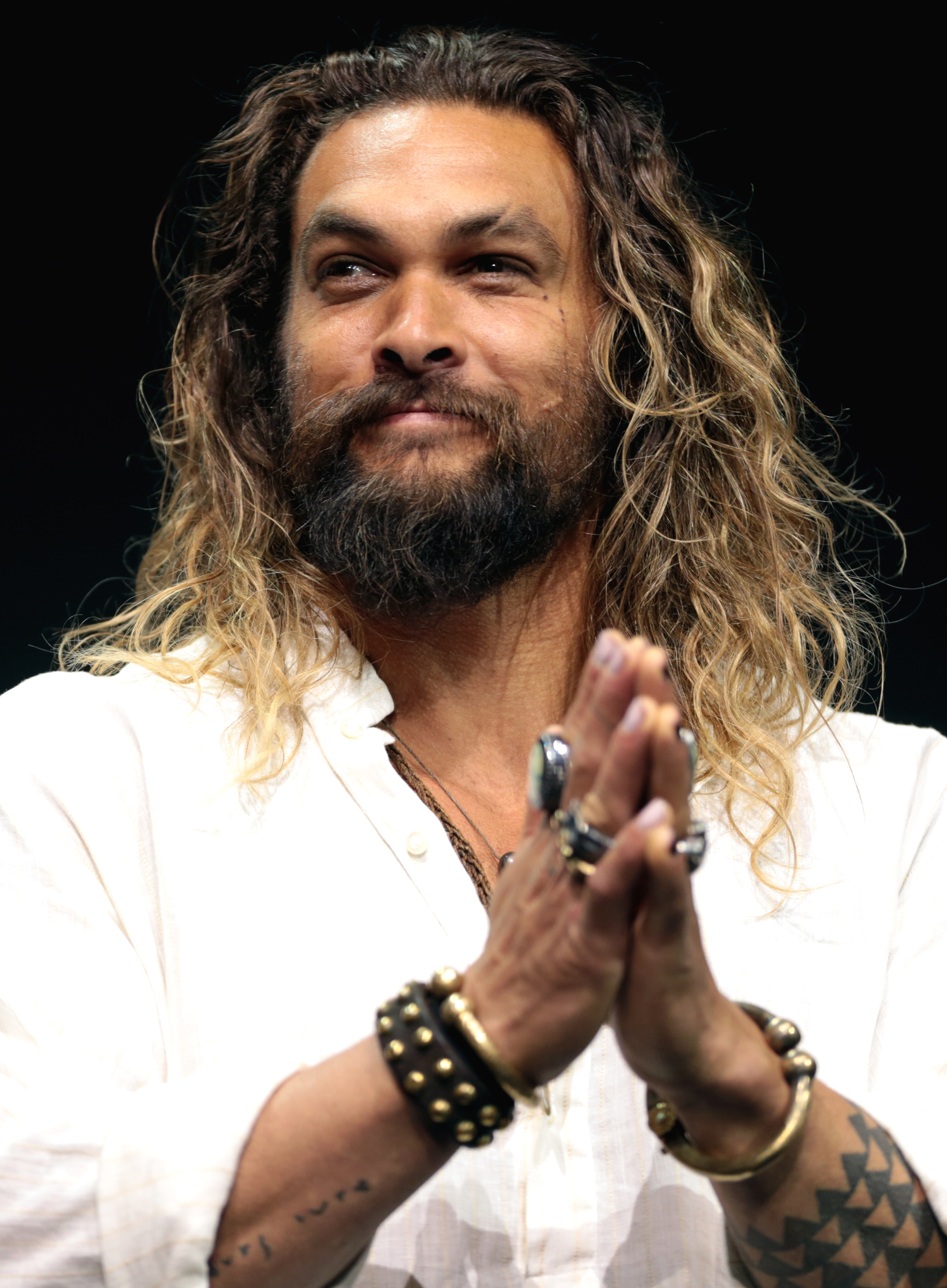
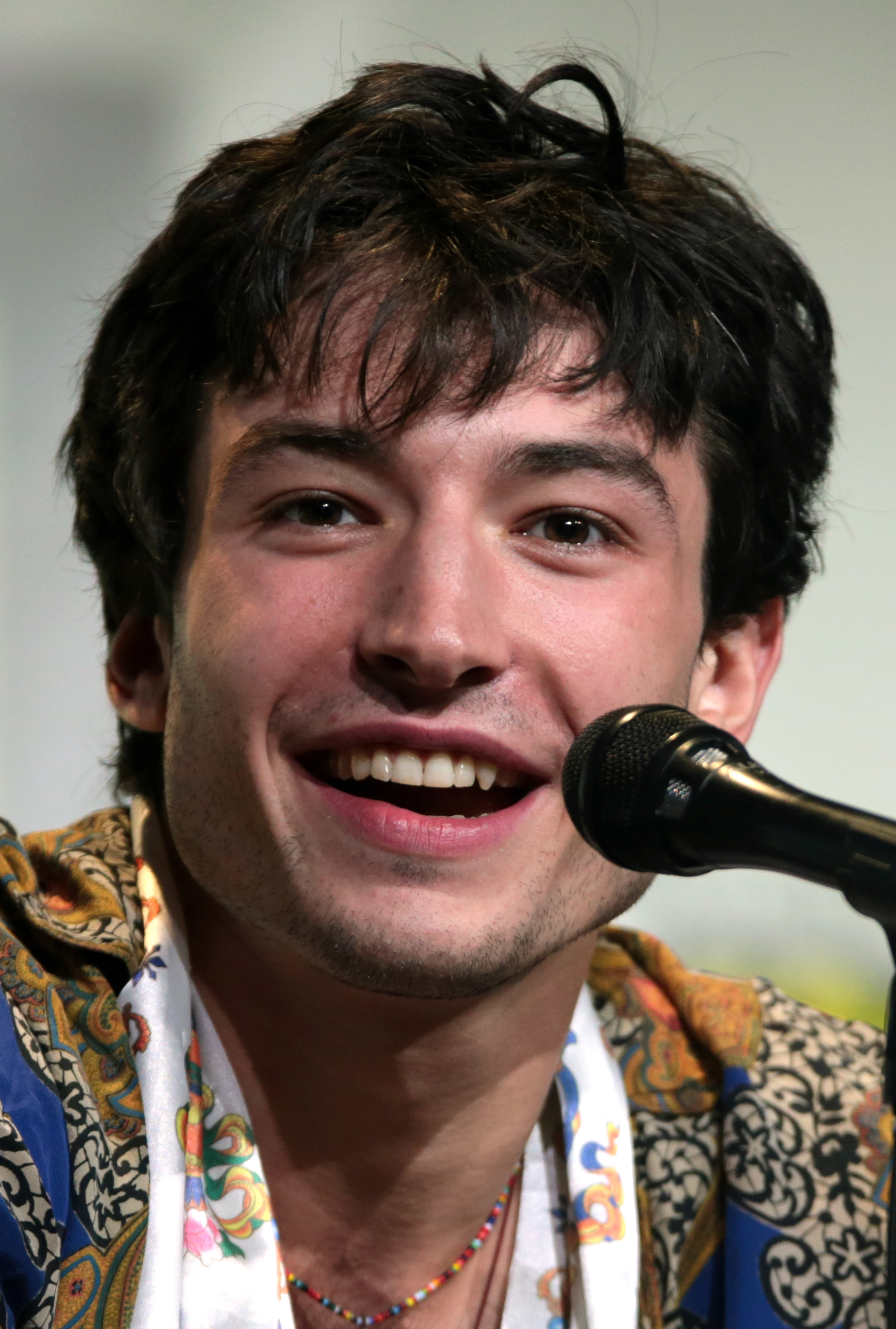
Jason Momoa (left) and Ezra Miller (right) appear in the episode as their respective characters in the DC Extended Universe (DCEU).

The episode featured an uncredited cameo appearance of Jason Momoa and Ezra Miller, both reprising their roles as Arthur Curry / Aquaman and Barry Allen / The Flash from the DC Extended Universe (DCEU), while Superman and Wonder Woman were portrayed by stand-ins over Henry Cavill and Gal Gadot. Gunn was initially worried that Smith's claim of Aquaman having sex with fishes would upset Momoa, but Momoa found it funny and agreed to appear in the episode. Miller's participation was also possible, as they liked Gunn's films and agreed to appear when they were asked. Miller's scene was filmed on the set of the Marvel Cinematic Universe (MCU) film Guardians of the Galaxy Vol. 3 (2023), which was allowed by Marvel Studios as a favor to Gunn, who had Chukwudi Iwuji's screen test for the film filmed from the set of Peacemaker. Gunn described the moment as "It was done through pure force of will on my part, of really pushing it to happen. I think everybody read it in the script, agreed to it, and then it became a thing, and they realized what a big fucking deal it was".

While Gunn was often questioned during the season for some jokes where Smith insulted other characters, the studio didn't oppose most of the content in the finale, explaining, "They were pretty open to whatever, and they knew what the nature of Peacemaker was and who he is. We can't go into this and have Peacemaker spouting a bunch of bullshit about politics and women and not have him spouting bullshit about characters in the DCEU". Despite the support, the original cut included stand-in actors over Ben Affleck and Ray Fisher for Batman and Cyborg, which were removed by Gunn on petition of the studio. Gunn explained that the scenes might have been removed as the studio has bigger plans for the characters in the future.

The episode also featured an uncredited cameo appearance by Viola Davis as Amanda Waller, similar to her cameo appearance in "A Whole New Whirled". Similarly to her previous appearance, the crew traveled to Los Angeles to film her scene.

=== Filming ===
While the episode was the eighth to air, it was actually the sixth to be filmed. Generally, the episodes took 12–15 days to film. In contrast, the episode required night shoots that had to delay filming for proper lighting, taking 21–22 days to film.

=== Music ===
The farm attack included the song "Do Ya Wanna Taste It" by Wig Wam, which is also used in the opening credits of the episodes. According to Gunn, the song "kind of leads to that moment". He also further drew meaning from the lyric, "Do you want to taste it", with "Do you want to deal with this shit from these three badasses?" He further added, "it all leads up to Harcourt getting wounded and choking on her own blood."

== Reception ==
=== Critical reviews ===
The first seven episodes of the series were sent out in screeners to television critics. While HBO Max wanted to send the eighth episode as well, Gunn convinced them to not send it for surprise factors, stating "There's just too many things happening in episode eight that I just could not let it get out there."

"It's Cow or Never" received critical acclaim. Samantha Nelson of IGN gave the episode an "amazing" 9 out of 10 rating and wrote in her verdict, "Peacemaker successfully brings its first season to a close with an emotional, heartfelt, and hilarious finale. There's less action than some may prefer, and the major cameo was more spectacle than substance, but this first chapter of our ride with Chris Smith was given a delightfully meaningful ending that leaves us hyped for the already announced Season 2."

Jarrod Jones of The A.V. Club gave the episode an "A–" grade and wrote, "Peacemaker is and has always been about personal growth —for Chris, for Leota, for us. 'Did I just kill the world?' Peacemaker asks Leota. “Maybe,” she says, 'or maybe you just gave us a chance to make our own choices instead of our bug overlords.' For the first time in both their lives, they have control over what happens next. It's a good feeling to find your inner strength, but it's important to understand that it's a fleeting thing. Maybe that's why Auggie Smith pops up in Chris' head for that final shot; it's Gunn's personal coda, and a reminder that even though you're always striving to better yourself, there's always room for improvement. You're always going to struggle with your demons."

Alan Sepinwall of Rolling Stone wrote, "So what did we learn from the Peacemaker finale, kids? Well, we learned that a human torpedo is ultimately more powerful than a kaiju that provides milk for a race of butterfly aliens. We learned that Peacemaker is perhaps less of a garbage person than he once seemed. And we learned that maybe, just maybe, Peacemaker wasn't lying about Aquaman fucking fish? Or maybe we just learned that Peacemaker creator James Gunn can now get away with anything in the realm of comic-book movies and TV shows." Brian Lowry of CNN wrote, "At times, Peacemaker felt like it was trying too hard to be irreverent, but that reflects Gunn's creative sensibility, while sending a message to talent about what's possible in the world of streaming - including dragging Aquaman into your show, just for fun."

Rafael Motamayor of Observer wrote, "Peacemaker is a more adult effort than Guardians of the Galaxy, which plays to Gunn's visceral and irreverent sensibilities, and also longer and more character-focused than The Suicide Squad. The result may just be the best superhero story James Gunn has ever told. Thankfully HBO Max has announced a second season, because when it comes to more Peacemaker episodes, I really do wanna taste it." Miles Surrey of The Ringer wrote, "The first season of James Gunn's DC series was funny and expertly staged, but most impressively, it added layer after layer to its titular hero." James White of Empire gave the season a 4 star rating out of 5 and wrote, "Gunn scores a bullseye with this series, blending vulgarity, heart and sheer insanity for a winning, killer combo – not to mention, an unskippable opening-credits sequence that you'll never grow tired of watching."

Alec Bojalad of Den of Geek gave the episode a perfect 5 star rating out of 5 and wrote, "Peacemaker asks a very compelling question in its first episode. Now, after this wonderful finale, I think it's fair to say that the answer to that question is an emphatic yes, yes we do want to taste it." Roxy Simons of Newsweek wrote, "Peacemaker came to a thrilling conclusion on Thursday, February 17 with an action-packed final stand and some huge DC cameos."

=== Accolades ===
TVLine named Steve Agee as the "Performer of the Week" for the week of February 19, 2022, for his performance in the episode. The site wrote, "Filed under We Were Not Expecting This was the way that this season's running and incredibly juvenile 'Dye Beard' put-down came full circle in a surprising way, leading to a helluva performance by Steve Agee."
