= Rick Flag =

DC Comics characters

- The Rick Flag Jr. version of the character. Art by Tom Derenick.

Publication information
- Publisher: DC Comics
- First appearance: Richard Flag Jr: The Brave and the Bold #25 (September 1959); Richard Flag Sr. Secret Origin #14 (1987)
- Created by: Robert Kanigher; Ross Andru

In-story information
- Alter ego: Richard Rogers Flag Jr. Richard Montgomery Flag Sr.
- Team affiliations: Rick Flag Jr: Suicide Squad (Task Force X); Navy SEALs; United States Air Force; Forgotten Heroes; Rick Flag Sr: United States Army; Suicide Squad (Squadron S)
- Partnerships: Rick Flag Jr.: Amanda Waller; Bronze Tiger
- Notable aliases: Rick Flag Jr. Anthony Miller
- Abilities: Both versions are skilled military leaders proficient in unarmed combat, armed combat, and knowledgeable in military protocol.

Altered in-story information for adaptations to other media
- Alter ego: Richard Bill Flag Sr. Richard Bill Flag Jr.
- Team affiliations: Rick Flag Sr. Creature Commandos
- Partnerships: Rick Flag Jr: June Moone

Rick Flag is the name of several characters featured in American comic books published by DC Comics. Created by Robert Kanigher and Ross Andru, he made his first appearance in The Brave and the Bold #25 (September, 1959). While originally a single character, due to the nature of his resurgence in John Ostrander's Suicide Squad run, the history was retroactively altered to feature two Rick Flags as relatives, one existing during the World War II era and in contemporary times respectively.

The most-well known version, Richard Rogers Flag Jr. (Rick Flag Jr.), is the field commander of the modern Task Force X (Suicide Squad), a black-ops team which uses super-villains as expendable agents for dangerous missions in return for a commuted sentence. Differing in not being a criminal asset coerced and having an exemplary military record, he is considered one of Amanda Waller's loyal and trusted operatives. Due to the character's existence in contemporary times, he has been altered to either be the son or grandson of the "original" Rick Flag. The second version of the character, Richard Montgomery Flag Sr (or simply Rick Flag Sr.), is the father (or grandfather) of Rick Flag Jr who was retroactively stated to have led the original Suicide Squad (codenamed Squad S) during World War II, composed of expendable soldiers whose experience with them left an impression on him. Rick eventually fathered his son, whom he named after him. His history as the original squad leader would influence his son's eventual placement within a new iteration decades later.

The character made his live-action debut in the television series Smallville, played by Ted Whittall. Joel Kinnaman portrayed Rick Flag Jr. in the DC Extended Universe films Suicide Squad (2016) and The Suicide Squad (2021), while Frank Grillo plays his father, Rick Flag Sr., in the DC Universe (DCU) animated series Creature Commandos (2024–present) and the films Superman (2025) and Man of Tomorrow (2027). Both reprise their roles in the second season of Peacemaker (2025), set in the DCU.

== Fictional character biography ==
=== Rick Flag Sr. ===
Richard Montgomery Flag led a division in World War II called the Suicide Squad. In his first mission, Flag was the only survivor. After that, his team had increasing success and decreasing casualties. After the war, he married Sharon Race. In 1951, with the disappearance of the Justice Society of America and other superheroes, President Harry S. Truman again called on Flag when he created Task Force X.

Task Force X would have two units: the military unit "Argent" (led by "Control"), and the civilian unit "Suicide Squad" which would deal with civilian matters — masked villains and the like. Commander Jeb Stuart would lead the military side to deal with national and international crises. Though Argent's recorded activity ceased after 1960, Stuart's Suicide Squad continued on. Eventually, Flag sacrificed himself in stopping the former Blackhawks' nemesis, the War Wheel.

In 2016, DC Comics implemented a relaunch of its books called "DC Rebirth", which restored its continuity to a form much as it was prior to "The New 52". In this continuity, Flag is depicted as the father of Richard Rogers Flag and the grandfather of Rick Flag Jr.

=== Rick Flag Jr. ===
Flag was replaced in the Squad by his now-grown son Richard Rogers Flag. Flag heads a new, public team which included his girlfriend, Karin Grace, Hugh Evans, and Jess Bright. In one mission in Cambodia, they were pursued by a Yeti. Evans and Bright and the Yeti fell into a crevasse, presumably to their deaths. Bright, near-death, was found by the Chinese, who nursed him back to health. He was then passed onto the Russians, who transformed him into a bionic monster called Koshchei the Deathless.

Rick Flag Jr. is hired to lead Amanda Waller's Suicide Squad, a role he reluctantly assumed. Immediately, Flag showed signs of instability, which are worsened when Karin Grace became the team's medic. Flag hates working with the criminals under his command. After U.S. Senator Cray threatens to reveal the existence of the Suicide Squad to the public, Flag sets out to assassinate him. However, Deadshot finds Flag and Cray, killing Cray.

Flag sets out to destroy the Jihad team after learning that his father had previously attacked their stronghold, Jotunheim, during World War II to neutralize a Nazi prototype nuclear weapon. The bomb is intact, but buried under rubble, with the Jihad being unaware of its presence. Flag battles the Jihad's leader Rustam personally, just before the bomb explodes.

In Checkmate (vol. 2), Flag is revealed to be alive and is rescued from prison in Qurac by Bronze Tiger. Additionally, General Wade Eiling admits that Rick Flag Jr. is not the son of Rick Flag Sr., but a soldier named Anthony Miller who was brainwashed by Eiling into believing he was Flag's son. Miller's conditioning means that Eiling still has control of him, and uses him as part of his takeover of the Suicide Squad. Forced to activate an explosive implant in Waller's brain, Miller breaks free from his mind control enough to activate Eiling's implant instead, leaving him helpless enough to be captured. Confronted with the possibility to give up his presumed identity and return home, Miller decides that the Suicide Squad needs a Rick Flag, and refuses the offer.

In post-Rebirth continuity, Flag is depicted as the son of Richard Rogers Flag and the grandson of Rick Flag Sr. He was a soldier in Afghanistan who was incarcerated for turning down the medals that would have meant the death of his fellow soldiers. Flag Jr. was later approached by Amanda Waller to lead the Suicide Squad when Barack Obama threatened to shut it down.

=== Rick Flag III ===
Rick Flag III is the son of Rick Flag Jr and Karin Grace whom also shares his name with his relatives. He was kidnapped by Koschei the Deathless, a member of the Jihad, but was rescued by Nemesis. Later, when Flag Jr. and Bronze Tiger visited Rick Flag III's adopted home, Flag Jr. refused to approach him.

== Skills and abilities ==
Having a military background, Flag Jr. is considered to be an excellent pilot and is proficient in military tactics, strategy, and leadership. Flag Jr. also has combat and special operations training, making him capable in unarmed and armed combat. Due to his experience in these fields, he is able able to use a wide range of weaponry used by the United States' military.

== In other media ==
=== Television ===
- Rick Flag Jr. appears in the Justice League Unlimited episode "Task Force X", voiced by Adam Baldwin. This version is a member of Project Cadmus and leader of Task Force X.
- A character based on Rick Flag Jr. appears in Smallville, portrayed by Ted Whittall. This version's real name is Richard Stafford and the leader of the Suicide Squad, who initially work for Amanda Waller before being blackmailed into working for Chloe Sullivan.
- Rick Flag Jr. appears in Suicide Squad Isekai, voiced by Taku Yashiro in the Japanese version and Jeremy Gee in the English version.

=== Film ===
Rick Flag Sr. appears in Justice League: The New Frontier, voiced by Lex Lang. This version is Hal Jordan's instructor and co-pilot during a mission to Mars. Additionally, a young Rick Flag Jr. makes a non-speaking cameo appearance.

=== DC Extended Universe and DC Universe ===
Colonel Rick Flag Jr. and General Rick Flag Sr. appear in media set in the DC Extended Universe (DCEU) and the DC Universe (DCU), portrayed by Joel Kinnaman and Frank Grillo, respectively.

- Flag Jr. first appears in the DCEU film Suicide Squad (2016). This version is a Special Forces officer who is later tasked with leading the Suicide Squad. After being hired by Amanda Waller to watch over June Moone, he falls in love with the latter.
- Flag Jr. appears in the DCU film The Suicide Squad. He leads a new iteration of the squad on a mission to destroy a Nazi-era research facility called Jötunheim that is conducting inhumane experiments via the alien Starro. After learning the U.S. government secretly funded the experiments, Flag attempts to retrieve a hard drive containing the information and leak it, only to be killed by squad member Peacemaker, whom Waller secretly assigned to scrub the information.
- Flag Sr. first appears in the DCU series Creature Commandos. This version is a contemporary general and temporary leader of the eponymous team.
- Flag Sr. makes a minor appearance in the DCU film Superman.
- Flag Jr. and Sr. appear in the series Peacemaker, with the former appearing via archive footage from The Suicide Squad in the first season and uncredited appearances in the second season episode "Another Rick Up My Sleeve" via a flashback and an alternate universe version of Flag. Additionally as of the latter season, Flag Sr. has become the acting director of A.R.G.U.S.

=== Video games ===
- Rick Flag Jr. appears in Batman: Arkham Origins Blackgate, voiced again by Adam Baldwin.
- Rick Flag Jr. appears in Suicide Squad: Kill the Justice League, voiced by Jim Pirri.
