= Peacemaker (character) =

Comic book antihero

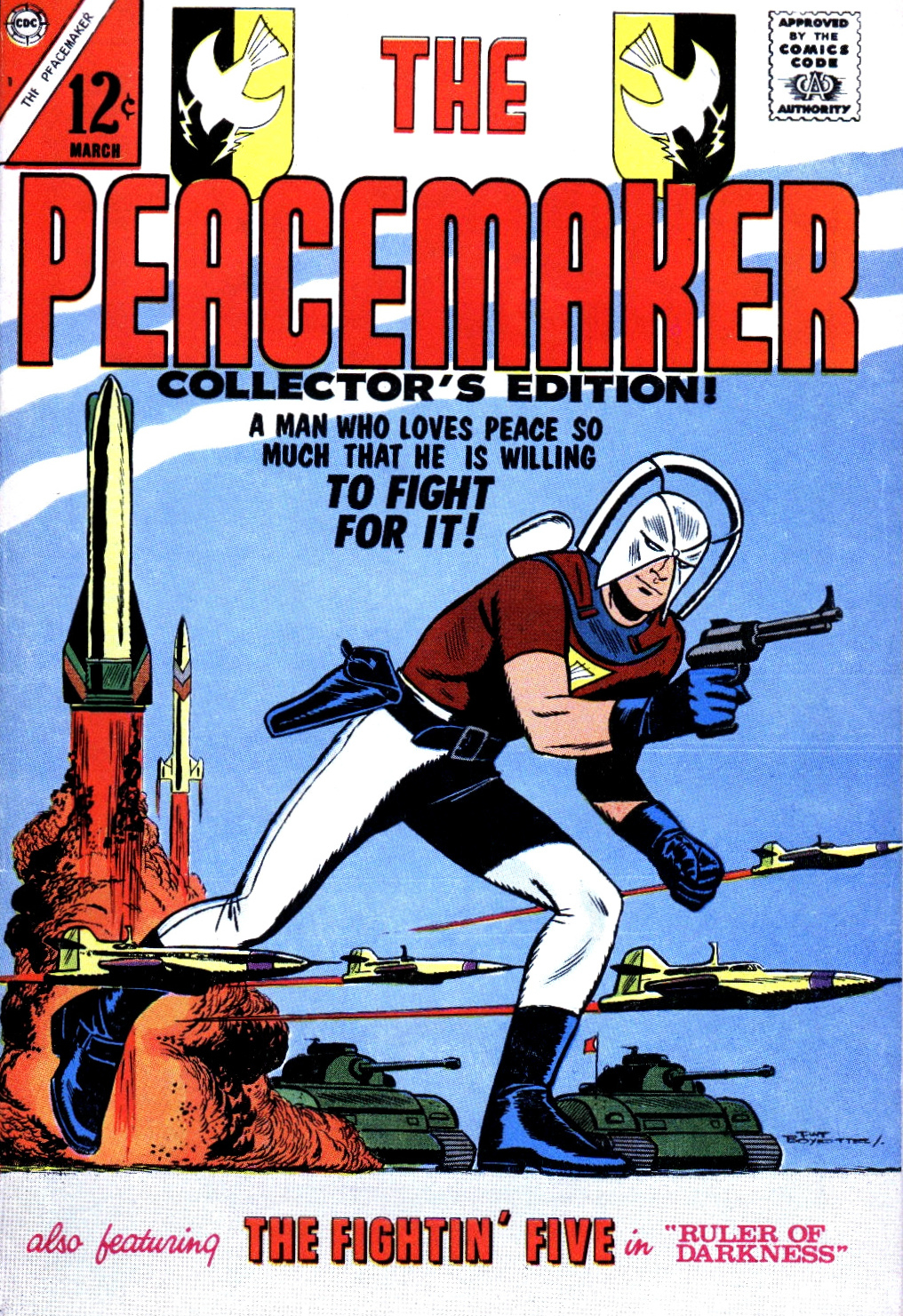
- Cover of Peacemaker #1 (March 1967), art by Pat Boyette

Publication information
- Publisher: Charlton Comics; DC Comics
- First appearance: Fightin' 5 #40 (November 1966)
- Created by: Joe Gill; Pat Boyette

In-story information
- Full name: Christopher Smith
- Species: Human
- Team affiliations: Checkmate; Shadow Fighters; Suicide Squad
- Partnerships: Amanda Waller; Vigilante; Blue Beetle; King Shark; Harley Quinn; Bloodsport
- Abilities: Master marksman; Skilled hand-to-hand combatant; Utilizes helmets that grant abilities

Peacemaker is an antihero originally owned by Charlton Comics and later acquired by DC Comics. The Peacemaker, Christopher Smith, first appeared in Fightin' 5 #40 (November 1966) and was created by writer Joe Gill and artist Pat Boyette. In his debut appearance, he was depicted as a pacifist willing to do anything to bring peace to the world. When DC Comics acquired Peacemaker they changed the character, as depicting him as a violent vigilante haunted by the ghosts of his past. Smith's incarnation would later be killed, and though another incarnation of Peacemaker would follow, Smith's incarnation would later be brought back and become a recurring character.

Peacemaker appears in media set in the DC Extended Universe (DCEU) and DC Universe (DCU) movie franchises, in which he is portrayed by John Cena. This incarnation, Christopher "Chris" Smith, appears in the DCEU film The Suicide Squad (2021) and the DCU film Superman (2025), in addition to starring in the television series Peacemaker (2022–2025).

Though largely forgotten following the 1980s, Peacemaker's appearances in The Suicide Squad and his television series were credited with reviving the character's popularity. Critics have highlighted the television incarnation of the character, and Cena's performance has been praised. Cena's incarnation's bisexuality has also been the subject of discussion from critics.

== Fictional character biography ==
=== Christopher Smith ===
==== Pre-Crisis on Infinite Earths ====
Acting as an envoy and diplomat of the "Geneva Arms Conference", Christopher is a pacifistic diplomat so committed to peace that he is willing to use force as a superhero to advance the cause. Taking on the title of "Peacemaker", he uses an array of weapons to combat many international threats. He also founded an organization known as the Pax Institute. The DC Comics continuity would later be rebooted in the Crisis on Infinite Earths storyline, which would alter Smith's backstory.

==== Post-Crisis on Infinite Earths ====
Smith is reintroduced as the son of elite Nazi officer Wolfgang Schmidt. He has been traumatized by the revelation of his father's true identity and subsequent suicide to avoid arrest, relocating to the United States. Smith would be haunted by his father's ghost who would give him commands, many of which Smith would obey. Smith would later serve as a soldier and was incarcerated after massacring a village of innocent people. Smith would join the government organization Project Peacemaker partway into his sentence. Taking on the mantle of Peacemaker, Smith would serve as a vigilante, believing that his helmet contained the ghosts of the people he killed or were killed in his vicinity. Smith subsequently joins the organization Checkmate, a special-forces unit, hunting terrorists until his own behavior becomes too extreme. Smith later dies during a battle with the villain Eclipso.

Peacemaker is returned to life, and would later become a mentor to Jaime Reyes, a new incarnation of the superhero Blue Beetle. Following this, he begins working with Amanda Waller, a government official he had previously worked with during his time with Checkmate. Peacemaker undertakes many missions for Waller before eventually joining the Suicide Squad.

Throughout the publishing initiative Dawn of DC, Peacemaker takes on an antagonistic role under Waller's orders, seeking to eradicate Earth's metahumans. He begins with infiltrating the Doom Patrol via Velvet, a worm-like metahuman who joins the Doom Patrol under the pretense of being a normal creature. Following the storyline Absolute Power, in which Waller was imprisoned, Peacemaker is tracked down by Green Arrow and imprisoned as well.

==== DC Extended Universe and DC Universe ====
Smith appears in media set in the DC Extended Universe and DC Universe. First appearing in the 2021 film The Suicide Squad, Peacemaker is sent by Amanda Waller to aid the Suicide Squad on a mission to destroy a Corto Maltese laboratory called Jötunheim that is conducting inhumane experiments via the alien Starro. Following this, the character appears in the 2022 television series Peacemaker. The series's first season sees him put on a government task force to stop a species of aliens known as the Butterflies. The second season of the series, released in 2025, depicts Peacemaker visiting a parallel universe where he is an admired public hero. Smith also makes cameo appearances in the DC Universe television series Creature Commandos (2024) and film Superman (2025).

=== Other versions ===
The character of Mitchell Black would take on the Peacemaker mantle following the original's death in the comics until his own death by the supervillain Prometheus. An alternate female version of character known as Peacewrecker is introduced in the crossover series Dark Crisis on Infinite Earths. A private army called the Peacemakers appear in Absolute Superman as enforcers of Lazarus Corp, with Christopher Smith appearing as a mentally unstable captain who is later forcibly turned into the cyborg Metallo by Brainiac.

=== In other media ===
The Christopher Smith incarnation of Peacemaker appears in the television series Suicide Squad Isekai, voiced by Takehito Koyasu in Japanese and Seán Patrick Judge in English. This version is a member of the Suicide Squad. In video games, the DCEU version of the character appears as a playable character in several video games, including the mobile version of Injustice 2, Mortal Kombat 1, DC Worlds Collide, and Fortnite Battle Royale. The Christopher Smith and Mitchell Black versions of Peacemaker appear in Scribblenauts Unmasked: A DC Comics Adventure.

== Development ==
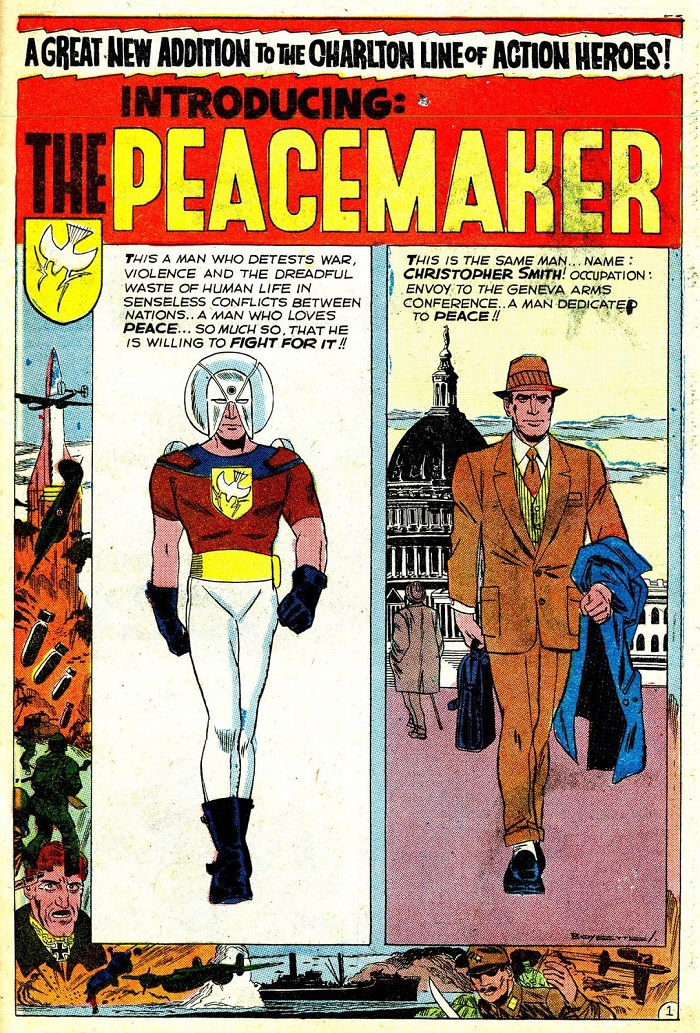
Comic book panel of Peacemaker's debut in Fightin' 5 #40 (November 1966).

=== In comics ===
The Peacemaker, named Christopher Smith, first appeared in a backup series in Charlton Comics' espionage-team title Fightin' 5 #40 (November 1966). He was created by Joe Gill and artist Pat Boyette, though Bill Montes has also been credited by IGN for Peacemaker's creation. Following his appearance in Fightin' 5, Peacemaker later received a short-lived comic run, which only lasted for five issues before being cancelled.

Due to financial troubles during a comics-industry sales slump, as well as Charlton Comics's own outdated internal systems, Charlton went out of business during the 1980s. The rights to Charlton Comics' characters, including Peacemaker, were acquired by DC Comics. Charlton Comics' characters were incorporated into DC Comics' fictional universe, first via an alternate world, before eventually being brought into the mainstream DC Comics continuity during the 1985 DC Comics crossover event Crisis on Infinite Earths. Following this, Peacemaker received a limited comics run in 1988, which was run by Paul Kupperberg and Todd Smith. The run redefined the character's personality and history.

Initially, Alan Moore and Dave Gibbons's comic series Watchmen was planned to feature characters taken from Charlton Comics' creations. Peacemaker was planned to appear, with the series being dubbed Who Killed the Peacemaker?. Though DC initially allowed the usage of these characters, the later plan to incorporate the characters into the mainstream DC universe as part of Crisis on Infinite Earths resulted in DC retracting the ability to use them, stating that they did not want the characters left either "dead or dysfunctional." This resulted in Moore and Gibbons creating original characters to fulfill the outlined roles, with Peacemaker being replaced by the Comedian.

Smith's incarnation of the character was killed during the events of the comic crossover event Janus Directive, resulting in his replacement by another incarnation named Mitchell Black. Smith later appeared in the comic Day of Judgement, where he was returned to life. Smith proceeds to mentor Jaime Reyes, a new incarnation of fellow Charlton Comics character Blue Beetle. Smith was later given his own backup feature in the Inferior Five comics before being incorporated into the Suicide Squad comics run. Though historically Peacemaker had not been a member of the Suicide Squad, his appearance in the 2021 film The Suicide Squad resulted in Peacemaker being put onto the team in the comics.

=== In film and television ===
Christopher Smith / Peacemaker, as portrayed by John Cena in the DC Extended Universe and the DC Universe franchises.

While writing The Suicide Squad (2021), filmmaker James Gunn selected Peacemaker to appear as one of the titular squad's members. Gunn was initially looking to cast Dave Bautista in the role, as the two had previously collaborated on the Guardians of the Galaxy films in the MCU franchise with Bautista's portrayal of Drax the Destroyer. However, Bautista was unavailable for the role due to taking the lead role in Zack Snyder's Army of the Dead (2021).

John Cena entered talks to portray the character in April 2019, as Gunn had wanted to work with Cena upon seeing his performance in the romantic comedy Trainwreck (2015), and had been looking for an appropriate role for him for a while. Cena had previously auditioned unsuccessfully for roles in both Marvel and DC Comics-based films. Cena's casting in the role was officially revealed in August 2020. Upon being cast, Gunn told Cena not to read any comics featuring Peacemaker, as Gunn felt Cena having a preconceived notion of the character would distract from the story he wanted to tell. During the promotion of The Suicide Squad, Cena decided to wear the Peacemaker costume for interviews and other promotional events as a way to familiarize the audience with the lesser-known character, which was a tactic that he had previously used as a professional wrestler.

After finishing work on The Suicide Squad, Gunn began working on a spinoff series about the origins of Peacemaker "just for fun" during his COVID-19 lockdown isolation. He brought the idea to producer Peter Safran, who was later approached by DC Films to create a Suicide Squad spinoff series. According to DC Cinematic Universe: A Celebration of DC at the Movies, Gunn was asked to make a Suicide Squad spinoff series based on one of the characters from the film, with his prior work during the lockdown resulting in him choosing Peacemaker to be the series' lead. The character does not get as much exploration or development as the other members of the Suicide Squad during the 2021 film, which is one of the reasons that Gunn decided to create the series despite him originally intending for the character's apparent death in the film to be permanent. The Peacemaker series was eventually picked up by HBO Max in September 2020, with Gunn writing all eight episodes of the first season and directing five of them. Cena agreed to reprise the role for the series in 2020, becoming an executive producer with Gunn and Safran. As a result, Peacemaker, who was originally intended to die in The Suicide Squad, was kept alive for the series, and a post-credits scene was filmed in January 2021 for the film to set up Peacemaker, which also began filming around that time. Following the first season's success, a second season of Peacemaker was ordered in 2022.

=== Characterization ===
Peacemaker was originally characterized as a pacifist so dedicated to peace that he did whatever was necessary to fight against warmongers. In his comics, he fought alongside an institution of his founding known as the Pax Institute. Following the acquisition of the character by DC, Peacemaker was re-characterized as a violent vigilante who had a mental breakdown after discovering his father was secretly a Nazi. The character believed he was haunted by the ghost of his father, as well as the ghosts of all those who his father had killed. Smith believed the ghosts could speak to him through his helmet, and the ghosts offered him wisdom and strategy. This version of Peacemaker is recruited by the organization Checkmate, and this incarnation would serve as the inspiration for later film and television depictions of the character.

The 1980s were the main period of Peacemaker's original popularity, a time when antiheroes such as Wolverine and the Punisher were popular. Peacemaker's DC counterpart is an anti-hero and a master of weapons. He wields advanced weaponry and technologically advanced armor, including a jetpack and jetplane, as well as many types of explosives and firearms. One of Peacemaker's most defining traits is his helmet. The helmet has the ability to emit ultrasonic frequencies to overwhelm people's senses and scramble electronics, the ability to sense hostile enemies in the nearby area, the ability to fire lasers, swim underwater, and mimic other people's voices. In the Peacemaker television series, Smith has multiple helmets, with each one having its own unique ability.

For the character's appearance in The Suicide Squad and Peacemaker, Peacemaker is portrayed as a patriotic, jingoistic character who is willing to do anything for what he sees as "freedom" and "peace". He is emotionally closed off and portrayed as a "rude, violent jerk." The television series expands on Peacemaker's character, depicting him haunted by his murder of the character Rick Flag Jr. Smith is depicted working to make peace with himself and grow as a character, receiving encouragement from several supporting characters in the series while others judge him for who he is outwardly, believing he cannot change. The television series also focuses on Smith's relationship with his abusive father, Auggie, a racist who acts as the villain White Dragon. Multiple critics characterised Cena's portrayal of Peacemaker as being inspired by Watchmen's Comedian. Cena elected to portray the character as bisexual in the television series, with Gunn stating that Cena made Smith "into this hyper-sexualized dude that is open to anything sexually." Cena examined the history of Peacemaker in the comics and determined that with Christopher Smith's childhood struggles and hardships, he would be "willing to do anything to a certain extent."

== Critical reception ==
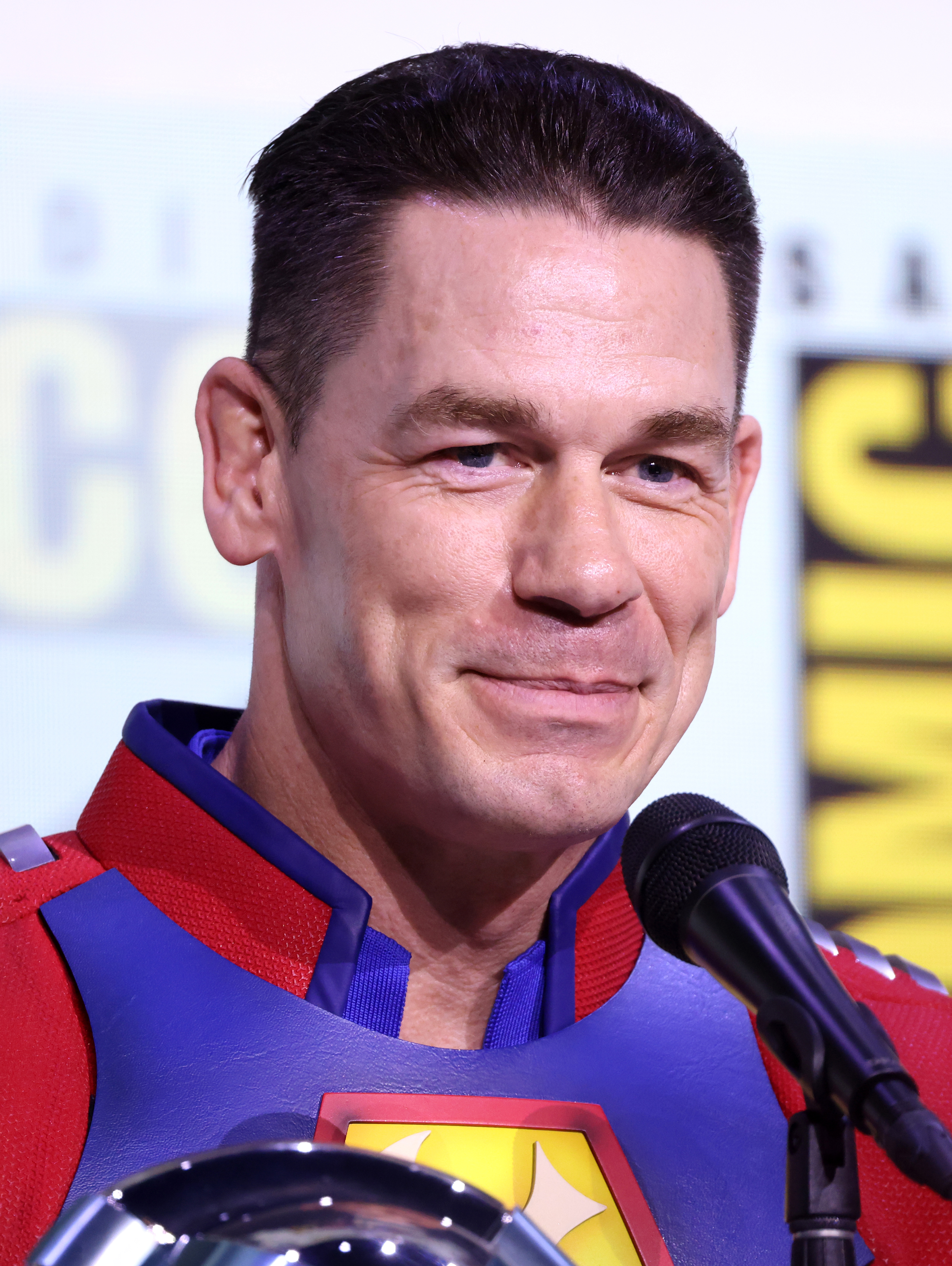
Cena's performance as Peacemaker was praised by critics.

Despite early popularity under Charlton, Peacemaker as a character quickly fell into obscurity following his appearances in the 1980s. Richard Newby, writing for The Hollywood Reporter, stated that while nobody actively disliked the character, nobody actively cared about the character either. Newby stated that by the time Peacemaker had become a DC character, "he was already relegated to the D-list", and that the 2022 television series was what had made people care about the character. Polygon's Susana Polo highlighted the television series' portrayal of Smith, stating that it allowed the character to finally be interesting for reasons outside of the character's scrapped appearance in Watchmen. Polygon's Lux Alptraum stated that the Peacemaker television series allowed the character to expand from being the "flat" character previously depicted in The Suicide Squad.

Cena's performance as the character has been positively highlighted by critics in both The Suicide Squad and Peacemaker. James McMahon, writing for NME, highlighted the series's portrayal of Peacemaker and Cena's performance, citing its "irreverent", Watchmen-inspired portrayal of superheroes. Newby highlighted the depth Cena was able to give the character, allowing viewers to see a side to a character they otherwise would have forgotten about, stating that Smith's portrayal in the series allows for "a new way to understand what comic characters can offer when allowed genuine change by artists seeking the same."

Writing for The Escapist, Darren Mooney stated that Smith's usage of equipment created by his racist father in the television series was symbolic of heroes engaging with the legacy and "thorny history" of comics in a way few other superhero comic adaptations did. Danielle Ryan, writing for /Film, praised the characterization of Smith in the series as someone trying to defy expectations of others to become a better person. Ryan highlighted the growth of the character throughout the series and the empathy offered to him by the series' supporting cast, which allows him the chance to change in the first place.

Ryan, in another article for /Film, praised Smith's characterization as bisexual, stating that the television series allowed Smith to be "queer without challenging his masculinity" which allowed for the series to challenge stereotypical depictions of bisexual characters in television. Ryan also believed this portrayal would allow many bisexual fans to feel more represented on-screen, and potentially have others re-assess their beliefs on bisexual men. Jenna Anderson, writing for ComicBook.com, positively highlighted Smith's bisexuality for adding more LGBTQ representation to DC Comics media and subverting expectations for the Peacemaker character. Conversely, Alptraum felt Smith's bisexuality was poorly represented, being easy to miss and more reflective of Smith just being sexually charged as a character. Alptraum felt it fell into pre-existing stereotypes regarding bisexual men on television, stating that "we're stuck with a limited vision that reinforces the idea that male bisexuality is nothing more than overflow of indiscriminate horniness" and that it did nothing to confront pre-existing stigma towards bisexual men. Digital Spy's Matt Taylor similarly stated that compared to other LGBTQ+ representation in the series, Smith's bisexuality was highly underrepresented, which they felt was problematic due to the historically poor treatment of bisexual men in the real world.
