= Jennifer Holland =

American actress

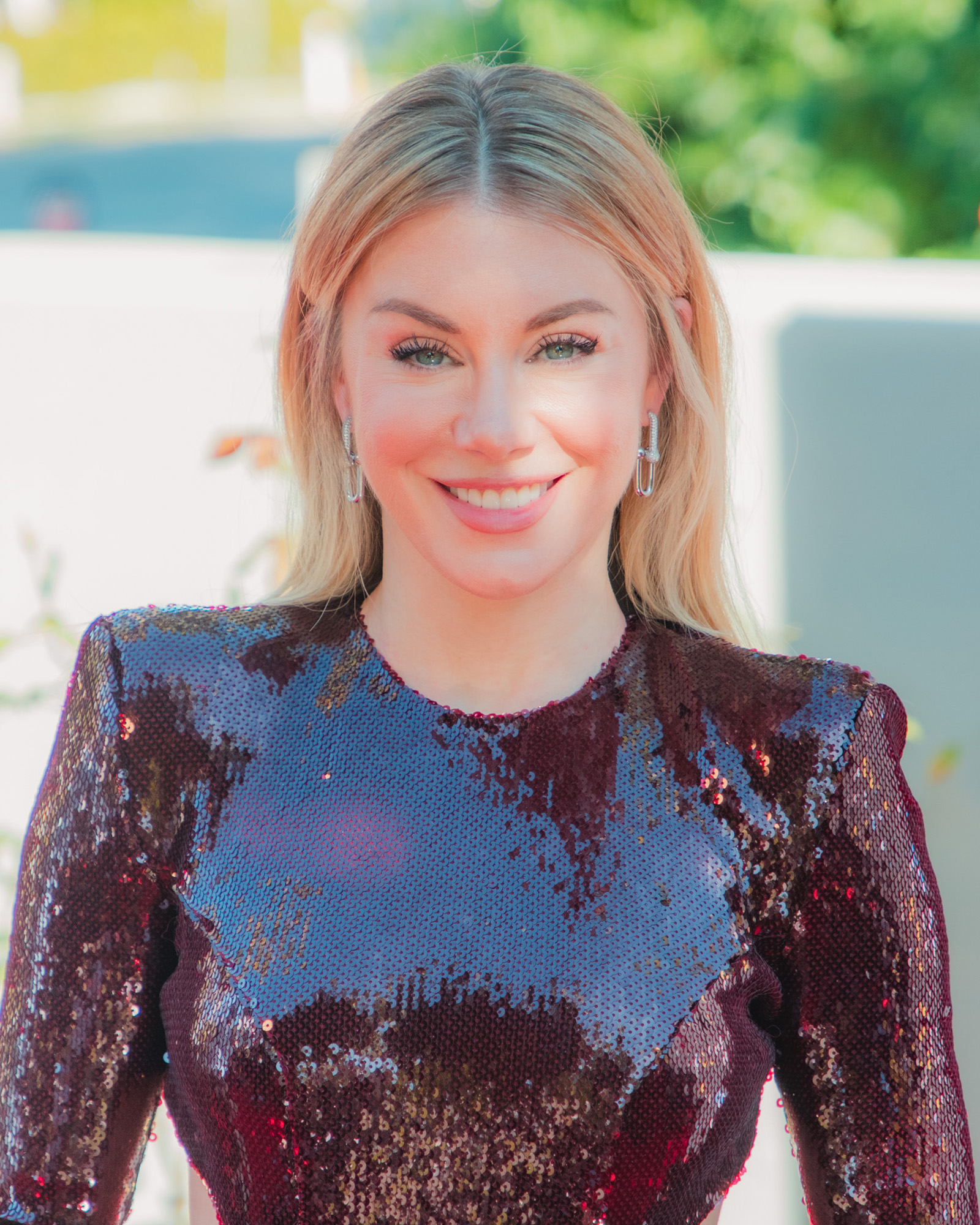
- Holland in 2026
- Occupations: Actress, model
- Years active: 2004–present
- Spouse: James Gunn (m. 2022)

Jennifer Holland is an American actress and model. She is best known for her work as Emilia Harcourt in the DC Studios films The Suicide Squad (2021), Black Adam (2022), and Shazam! Fury of the Gods (2023), and series Peacemaker (2022–2025), spanning both the DC Extended Universe and DC Universe franchises. She also appeared as Ashley in the sex comedy film American Pie Presents: The Book of Love (2009).

== Career ==
Holland moved to Los Angeles at the age of seventeen to pursue a career in acting. She has a background in gymnastics.

In 2008, Holland appeared in the short film Assorted Nightmares: Janitor, voicing the character Kate. In 2017, she starred as Becky Phillips in the limited series Sun Records. In 2021, she appeared in the superhero film The Suicide Squad as Emilia Harcourt. In 2022, she reprised her role in the HBO Max television series Peacemaker and the film Black Adam.

== Personal life ==
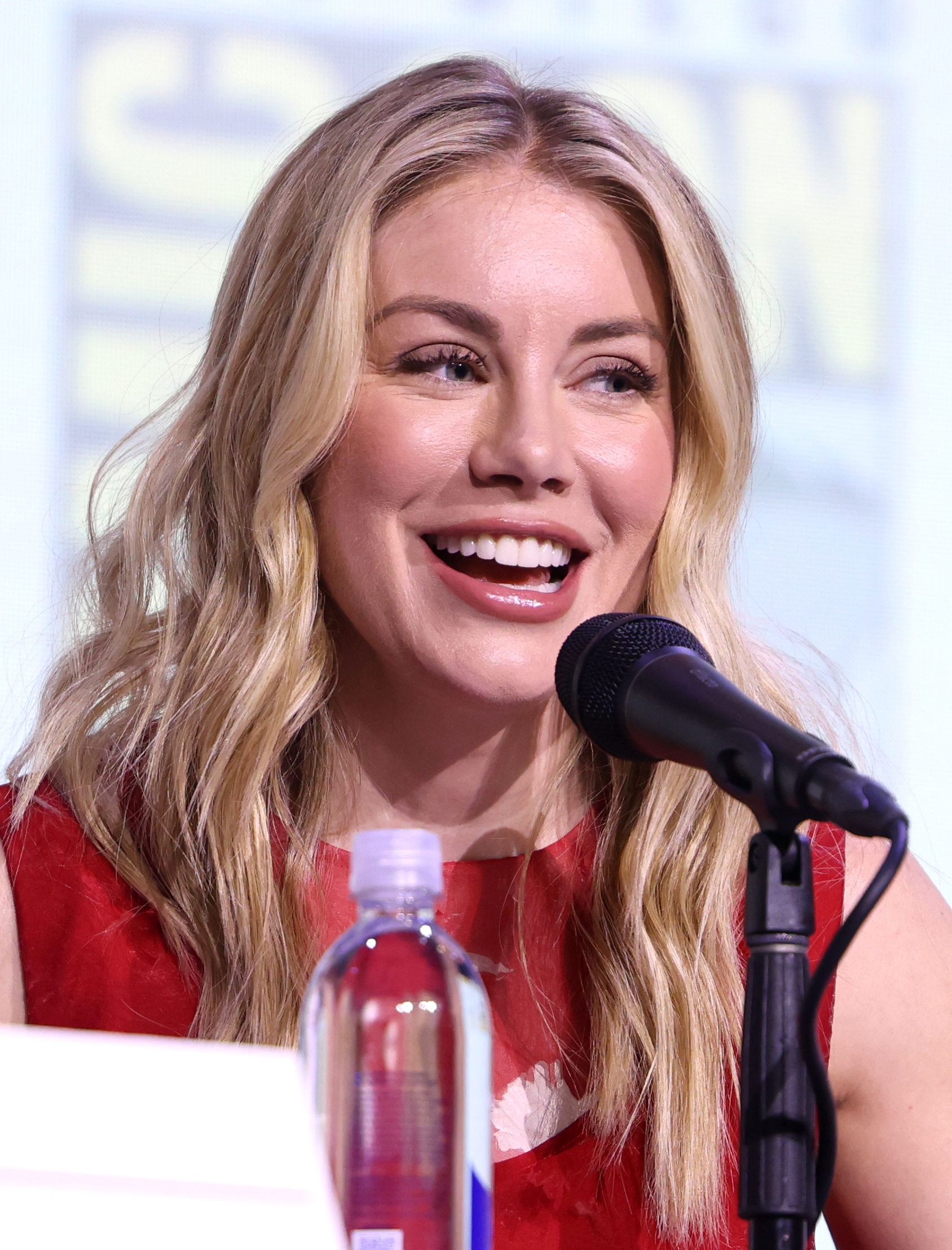
Holland at the 2025 San Diego Comic-Con

Holland began a relationship with writer/director James Gunn in 2015. They met through actor Michael Rosenbaum who was dating a friend of Holland's at the time and offered to set them up after Gunn saw her in a photo of Rosenbaum's. In February 2022, Holland and Gunn became engaged and were married at the end of September 2022. Her mother is a nurse.

== Filmography ==
=== Film ===
| Year | Title | Role | Notes | Ref. |
|---|---|---|---|---|
| 2004 | The Sisterhood | Christine | Direct-to-video film | |
| 2005 | House of the Dead 2 | Sorority Girl | | |
| 2008 | Zombie Strippers | Jessy | Direct-to-video film | |
| 2009 | American Pie Presents: The Book of Love | Ashley | Direct-to-video film | |
| 2019 | Brightburn | Ms. Espenschied | | |
| 2021 | The Suicide Squad | Emilia Harcourt | | |
| 2022 | Black Adam | Emilia Harcourt | | |
| 2023 | Shazam! Fury of the Gods | Emilia Harcourt | Mid-credit scene | |
| 2023 | Guardians of the Galaxy Vol. 3 | Kwol | | |
| 2025 | Superman | Superman robot #22 | Voice; uncredited, also special thanks | |

=== Television ===
| Year | Title | Role | Notes |
|---|---|---|---|
| 2004 | Drake & Josh | Girl | Episode: "Drew & Jerry" |
| 2004 | Dante's Cove | Tina | Episode: "Pilot" (unaired) |
| 2005 | CSI: Miami | Julie Gannon | Episode: "Blood in the Water" |
| 2009 | Cougar Town | Candee | Episode: "Don't Do Me Like That" |
| 2010 | Rizzoli & Isles | Foil Bikini Girl | Episode: "She Works Hard for the Money" |
| 2010 | Days of Our Lives | April | Guest role |
| 2010 | Bones | Nicole Twist | Episode: "The Body in the Bag" |
| 2011 | Supah Ninjas | Melanie | Episode: "Snakeskin" |
| 2012 | All the Wrong Places | Jackie | Television film |
| 2012 | American Horror Story: Asylum | Nurse Blackwell | 2 episodes |
| 2013 | The Glades | Ashley Collins | Episode: "Shot Girls" |
| 2014 | Perception | Lucy Halpern | Episode: "Inconceivable" |
| 2016 | Rush Hour | Julia | Episode: "Familee Ties" |
| 2017 | Sun Records | Becky Phillips | Main role |
| 2022–2025 | Peacemaker | Emilia Harcourt | Main role |

=== Web ===
- Level 26: Dark Revelations (2011), as Simone, in episode: "Cyber-bridge Five"
