= Sam McCurdy =

British cinematographer

- Occupation: Cinematographer
- Years active: 1995–present

Sam McCurdy is a British cinematographer. He won a Primetime Emmy Award in the category Outstanding Cinematography for his work on the television program Shōgun.
