= Emilia Harcourt =

Publication information
- Publisher: DC Comics
- First appearance: Suicide Squad (vol. 5) #2 (October 2016)
- Created by: Rob Williams (writer); Jim Lee (artist)

In-story information
- Species: Metahuman
- Team affiliations: Justice League; Suicide Squad; A.R.G.U.S.
- Partnerships: Amanda Waller
- Abilities: Master markswoman; Expert martial artist and hand-to-hand combatant; Peak human physical and mental conditioning; Expert strategist, tactician, and field commander; Expert acrobat, gymnast, and aerialist; Expert spy; Proficient in utilizing various high-tech equipment and weapons; Energy projection

Emilia Harcourt is a fictional character featured in American comic books published by DC Comics. Similar to her boss Amanda Waller, Harcourt is a woman with a distaste for conventional crime fighting, employs more hardline methods, and is an expert tactician and political operator. Harcourt has been both an ally and an antagonist to the superheroes of the DC Universe. She is also commonly associated with the government agency A.R.G.U.S. and for a brief time, was the field commander and director of the Suicide Squad.

Harcourt appears in media set in the DC Extended Universe (DCEU) and DC Universe (DCU) film franchises, portrayed by Jennifer Holland.

== Publication history ==
The character first appeared in Suicide Squad (vol. 5) #2 in 2016 and was created by Rob Williams and Jim Lee.

== Fictional character biography ==
At a young age, Emilia Harcourt was given firearms by her father, learning since then to be an expert markswoman, years later Eventually she would get a job at A.R.G.U.S. which would lead her into joining the Suicide Squad, becoming Amanda Waller's right hand.

Harcourt is later revealed to be a spy working for the People, a terrorist organization. Amanda Waller has Captain Boomerang kill Harcourt in retaliation. Long after Harcourt's death, Waller resurrects her using a Lazarus pit.

== Powers and abilities ==
Emilia Harcourt is a skilled fighter and leader. Following her resurrection, Harcourt gained the ability to project blasts of energy.

== In other media ==
Emilia Harcourt appears in media set in the DC Extended Universe and the DC Universe, portrayed by Jennifer Holland. This version appears in the DCEU films The Suicide Squad (2021), Black Adam (2022), Shazam! Fury of the Gods (2023), in addition to starring in the television series Peacemaker (2022–2025). She is an agent of A.R.G.U.S., aide to Amanda Waller, and founding member of Checkmate.
