= A.R.G.U.S. =

Fictional organization in DC comics

Publication information
- Publisher: DC Comics
- First appearance: Justice League vol. 2 #7 (May 2012)
- Created by: Geoff Johns; Gene Ha

In-story information
- Member(s): Amanda Waller; Steve Trevor; Etta Candy; Sasha Bordeaux

A.R.G.U.S. (Advanced Research Group Uniting Super-Humans) is a fictional government organization appearing in DC Comics. A.R.G.U.S. first appeared in Justice League vol. 2 #7 and was created by Geoff Johns and Gene Ha.

Headed by Amanda Waller, A.R.G.U.S. is typically depicted as a parent organization for the previously established Checkmate and Suicide Squad organizations. Since its debut, A.R.G.U.S has been adapted into numerous television projects within the Arrowverse, the DC Extended Universe, and DC Universe (both film and television), as well as numerous animated projects.

== Fictional organizational history ==
A.R.G.U.S. is a United States federal agency operating under the jurisdiction of Homeland Security. It is under the command of Col. Steve Trevor and Director Amanda Waller. It is introduced in The New 52 (a reboot of DC Comics continuity) following Darkseid's invasion. A.R.G.U.S. acts as support and liaison to the Justice League, supplying them with resources and cleaning up afterwards. Trevor was asked to stand down as head liaison after their battle with David Graves, having gotten too close to Wonder Woman.

During the "Trinity War" storyline, A.R.G.U.S. directly establishes the counterpart group to the Justice League in the form of the Justice League of America, of which Trevor is a member. Dr. Arthur Light is called in by A.R.G.U.S. to examine the Secret Society's communication coin. While doing so, it is manipulated from the other side causing Light to be enveloped in a white light, giving him powers. After seemingly losing control of his powers, Superman surrenders himself to A.R.G.U.S. at A.R.G.U.S. headquarters, the Question enters Superman's cell and releases him.

During the "Forever Evil" storyline, Steve Trevor awakens at the remains of the A.R.G.U.S. headquarters in Washington, D.C., and learns from Etta Candy that the headquarters' destruction was caused by a massive spike in energy around Doctor Light's body. After seeing the Crime Syndicate of America's broadcast, Trevor learns that the President of the United States is in danger as the President has a backup key that would assist in A.R.G.U.S. gaining their assets back. After rescuing the President from Deathstroke, Copperhead, and Shadow Thief, Trevor uses the key to open A.R.G.U.S.' Green Room and keep the President and Candy safe.

Mr. Green claims that the group was created by the Founding Fathers of the United States to safeguard American interests and shifted its focus multiple times throughout its history. In the 18th century, A.R.G.U.S. was the Armed Revolutionaries Governing Under Secrecy, which spied on the British to prepare for the American Revolution. In the 19th century, they became the Anonymous Ranger Group of the United States, helping the United States win every major battle in the American Civil War and pursuing dangerous criminals in the American frontier. In the late 19th century, A.R.G.U.S. engaged in a secret war with the Crimson, an apocalyptic cult that ensnared powerful politicians and businessmen with promises of heaven. The war with the Crimson Men, the Crimson's forces, ended with them being routed in the dawn of the 21st century, after which A.R.G.U.S. shifted its focus to superhumans, which Green claimed was an existential threat to humanity. Green was later revealed to be a member of the Crimson Men who are looking to reshape A.R.G.U.S. through Trevor and Candy.

== Members ==
- Sasha Bordeaux – Director
- Amanda Waller – Former director, head of the Suicide Squad
- Emilia Harcourt – Former director, head of the Suicide Squad
- Steve Trevor – Original founder, head of the Oddfellows
- Black Orchid
- Booster Gold
- Casey Klebba – Agent and husband of Dale Gunn.
- Chronos
- Dale Gunn – Agent and director of Circus of A.R.G.U.S.
- Darwin – The assistant to Dr. John Peril.
- Dr. John Peril – Top scientist.
- Etta Candy – Steve Trevor's secretary.
- Major Nicholson – She runs an A.R.G.U.S. base in Wisconsin called the Clinic.
- Meadows Mahalo – Special agent.
- John Economos – Warden of Belle Reve and ally of the Suicide Squad.
- Suicide Squad
  - Task Force X
    - Katana – Field leader; former second-in-command
    - Deadshot
    - Captain Boomerang / George "Digger" Harkness
    - Harley Quinn
    - Killer Croc
  - Task Force XL
    - Deadshot – Field leader
    - Akando
    - Captain Boomerang/Digger Harkness
    - Giganta
    - Harley Quinn
    - Katana
    - Parasite / Joshua Michael Allen
    - Solomon Grundy
  - Suicide Squad Black
    - El Diablo/Chato Santana – Field leader
    - Azucar / Veronica Lopez
    - Enchantress / June Moone
    - Gentlemen Ghost
    - Juniper / Zahra Abed
    - Klarion the Witch Boy
    - Tiamat / Katie Randles
    - Wither / Jade Tice
- Oddfellows – A clandestine A.R.G.U.S. unit that investigates superhuman and supernatural occurrences.
  - Charlie
  - Chief
  - Sameer
- Paul Chang
- Puzzler
- Stuart Paillard – Special agent.

=== Former members ===
- Atom / Rhoda Pineda – She was revealed to be a mole for the Crime Syndicate of America.
- Doctor Light / Arthur Light – Scientist.
- Doctor Mist – A sorcerer working in A.R.G.U.S.' magic division.
- Doctor Polaris
- Fastrack
- Primeape – Sam Simeon is a scientist and colleague of Dr. O'Day who was turned into a gorilla following an accident during his experiments with gorilla DNA from Gorilla City.
- Sebastian Faust – Director of A.R.G.U.S's magic division.
- Spore - Scientist.

== In other media ==
=== Television ===
- A.R.G.U.S. appears in series set in the Arrowverse, initially led by Amanda Waller until she is killed by Shadowspire and succeeded by Lyla Michaels. This version of the organization's name stands for Advanced Research Group United Support.
- A.R.G.U.S. appears in the Titans episode "Purple Rain", consisting of undercover agent "Margarita Vee" (portrayed by Karen Robinson).
- A.R.G.U.S. appears in the Doom Patrol episode "Donkey Patrol".
- A.R.G.U.S. appears in Superman & Lois.
- A.R.G.U.S. appears in Suicide Squad Isekai.

=== Film ===
- A.R.G.U.S. appears in Batman: Assault on Arkham.
- A.R.G.U.S. appears in Batman and Harley Quinn, with Sarge Steel as a prominent member.
- A.R.G.U.S. appears in Suicide Squad: Hell to Pay.

=== DC Extended Universe and DC Universe ===
A.R.G.U.S. appears in media set in the DC Extended Universe (DCEU) and DC Universe (DCU). The name stands for Advanced Research Group of the United States in the DCU.

- First appearing in Suicide Squad, this version is a covert sub-branch of the US military based in the John F. Ostrander Federal Building and is initially led by Amanda Waller.
- A.R.G.U.S. appears in The Suicide Squad, led by Waller and consisting of Rick Flag Jr., John Economos, Emilia Harcourt, and Flo Crawley.
- A.R.G.U.S. appears in Peacemaker, led by Waller in the first season and Rick Flag Sr. in the second season and consisting of Economos, Harcourt, Leota Adebayo, Sasha Bordeaux, and Langston Fleury. Near the end of the second season, Flag Sr. arranges for Lex Luthor's employees Otis Berg, Sydney Happersen, Ali Jessop, and Amanda McCoy to be released from prison and work for A.R.G.U.S.

=== Video games ===
A.R.G.U.S. appears in DC Universe Online.

== See also ==
- S.H.I.E.L.D., similar governmental organization from the Marvel Universe which is also concerned with superhero/supervillain-related matters
