= Peacemaker season 1 =

Peacemaker
- Season 1
- Promotional poster
- Showrunner: James Gunn
- Starring: John Cena; Danielle Brooks; Freddie Stroma; Chukwudi Iwuji; Jennifer Holland; Steve Agee; Robert Patrick
- No. of episodes: 8

Release
- Original network: HBO Max
- Original release: January 13 – February 17, 2022

Season chronology
- Next → Season 2

The first season of the American television series Peacemaker is based on the DC Comics character of the same name. It is the only television series in the DC Extended Universe (DCEU) and a spin-off from the 2021 film The Suicide Squad. Set after the events of the film, the season further explores jingoistic vigilante Chris Smith / Peacemaker as he is assigned to Project Butterfly, a project that sees him assassinate people who have been taken over by aliens. It was produced by the Safran Company and Troll Court Entertainment in association with Warner Bros. Television and with James Gunn as showrunner.

John Cena stars as the title character, reprising his role from The Suicide Squad, with Danielle Brooks, Freddie Stroma, Chukwudi Iwuji, Jennifer Holland, Steve Agee, and Robert Patrick also starring. Gunn conceived the series after noting Cena's strength as a dramatic actor while filming The Suicide Squad, and wrote all eight episodes while completing the film during the COVID-19 pandemic. Peacemaker was ordered straight-to-series in September 2020, and additional casting took place over the following months. Filming began in Vancouver, Canada, in January 2021, with Gunn directing five episodes. Production on the season wrapped in July. Gunn chose to use hair metal songs for the season's soundtrack, including "Do Ya Wanna Taste It" by Wig Wam for the opening titles; the title sequence features cast members seriously and stoically performing a choreographed dance number.

The season premiered on the streaming service HBO Max on January 13, 2022, with its first three episodes. The other five episodes were released weekly until February 17. Each episode received higher viewership than the last, and the finale broke the record for highest single-day viewership of an HBO Max original episode. The season received positive reviews from critics, with praise for Gunn's writing, story, characters, performances (particularly Cena's), emotional weight, themes, and opening title sequence. It was nominated for several awards including a Primetime Creative Arts Emmy Award for stunt coordination. A second season was ordered in February 2022. It integrates the series with Gunn's new DC Universe (DCU).

== Episodes ==
No. overall	No. in season	Title	Directed by	Written by	Original release date
1	1	"A Whole New Whirled"	James Gunn	James Gunn	January 13, 2022
Five months after his mission with the Suicide Squad in Corto Maltese, (Note: As depicted in the film The Suicide Squad (2021)) Chris Smith / Peacemaker has recovered from injuries suffered there and is discharged from hospital. Upon returning to his trailer home, Chris is confronted by a team: leader Clemson Murn, newcomer Leota Adebayo, plus A.R.G.U.S. agents Emilia Harcourt and John Economos. Murn gives Chris the choice of returning to Belle Reve prison or joining a new mission, "Project Butterfly", arranged by A.R.G.U.S. leader Amanda Waller. Chris reluctantly accepts the latter. Chris visits his emotionally distant and white supremacist father, Auggie, to retrieve his pet bald eagle, Eagly, and acquire a new outfit. During dinner with the team, Murn gives Chris a dossier of an assassination target. Later in a bar, Harcourt angrily rejects Chris's proposition of sex, so Chris accompanies another woman, Annie Sturphausen, to her apartment. After sex, Sturphausen attacks Chris, showcasing her superhuman strength. The fight ends when Chris activates a sonic boom weapon in his helmet that destroys Sturphausen. Meanwhile, Waller, who is Adebayo's mother, privately discusses with Adebayo a secret order to plant a forged diary in Chris's home.
2	2	"Best Friends, For Never"	James Gunn	James Gunn	January 13, 2022
Chris contacts Harcourt and explains his situation as Evergreen's police force, including detectives Sophie Song and Larry Fitzgibbon, arrive to investigate the sonic boom. While collecting his belongings in Sturphausen's apartment, Chris finds an alien device and keeps it. The police chase Chris, but fail to catch or identify him. Adebayo drives Chris, Harcourt and Eagly to safety, while Chris's wrecked car is left behind. In a rush, Economos switches Chris's car registration and fingerprint records with Auggie's. Song and Fitzgibbon arrest Auggie and jail him, where several white inmates hail him as the White Dragon. Chris tells the team that Sturphausen only attacked him after she read the dossier on his assassination target. Returning to his trailer, Chris regrets his aggravating nature and his killing of Rick Flag. The costumed and masked Vigilante arrives, wanting to befriend Chris, who expresses doubts over killing to achieve peace. Vigilante cheers Chris up by testing weapons and explosives together. They then discover that the alien device transforms into a small spaceship.
3	3	"Better Goff Dead"	James Gunn	James Gunn	January 13, 2022
The team's first mission is to assassinate United States Senator Royland Goff, a 'Butterfly', and his wife and children if they are also 'Butterflies'. Chris hesitates at killing children. The team conducts a stakeout outside the Goff household, joined by a tagalong Vigilante. The team sees the Goff family displaying alien-like behavior. Murn orders Chris to kill them all, but Chris freezes, despite having a clear shot. Vigilante takes his gun and kills Goff's wife and children, but Goff's bodyguard Judomaster intervenes, incapacitating Chris, Vigilante and Harcourt before Vigilante can kill Goff. Judomaster and Goff capture Chris and Vigilante into the house's basement. Adebayo saves Harcourt from Goff's other bodyguard, whom Harcourt executes. Goff sends Judomaster away to warn 'Glan Tai', but Economos incapacitates Judomaster. Goff tortures Vigilante (revealed to be diner employee Adrian Chase), but Chris refuses to divulge any information. Murn, Harcourt, and Adebayo use an explosive to access the basement. The explosion blasts Murn back, though he is largely unharmed, and blasts Chris forward, allowing him to escape his bonds. He shoots Goff's face, killing him. Chris and Adrian see a butterfly-like alien emerge from Goff's head. The team's computer shows thousands of suspected Butterflies worldwide.
4	4	"The Choad Less Traveled"	Jody Hill	James Gunn	January 20, 2022
Chris tells the team he killed Goff's Butterfly. Judomaster is restrained in the team's headquarters. Adrian drives Chris to Auggie's house to retrieve new helmets, where a neighbor reveals Auggie's jailing to Chris. Despite Murn and Adebayo's efforts to dissuade him, Chris visits Auggie and reveals the team's framing of Auggie and the team's goal of eliminating aliens. Auggie vows to tell the police this to exonerate himself and stop Chris from working with the "deep state". Adrian gets himself arrested in attempt to kill Auggie but fails to do so. Chris and Adebayo return to their headquarters where an escaped Judomaster fights Chris. Adebayo shoots Judomaster as he starts discussing the Butterflies; he is again restrained, unconscious. Murn has Economos arrange for Adrian's release from jail; the team learns Adrian's identity. Returning to his trailer, Chris takes out Goff's Butterfly, alive in a jar. Chris reflects on killing Rick Flag, being trained by Auggie to kill from a young age, and the death of his brother. Adebayo identifies Glan Tai Bottling Company as related to the Butterflies and informs Murn.
5	5	"Monkey Dory"	Rosemary Rodriguez	James Gunn	January 27, 2022
Murn briefs the team about Butterflies, who have taken over many notable figures, including celebrities and politicians. Butterflies enter humans, take over their brains, enhancing body strength, but only feed on a particular amber liquid. Murn has the rest of the team raid Glan Tai's factory, where they find the Butterflies' food being mass-processed. Chris's X-ray vision helmet reveals the factory employees as Butterflies, whom the team kills. They are attacked by Charlie, a Butterfly-controlled gorilla, whom Economos kills with a chainsaw, winning Chris's respect. The team bond over their success. Auggie has Song and Fitzgibbon recheck his fingerprints, exonerating him. Evan Calcaterra tells Song and Fitzgibbon that Chris is the real culprit. Murn arranges for his associate, Caspar Locke, to become the new Evergreen police captain; Locke overrides Song, proclaiming Auggie guilty, keeping him jailed. Song asks her uncle, Judge William Judy, to help issue a search warrant regarding Chris. Chris invites Adebayo to drink at his home; she plants a fake diary there to frame him, per Waller's orders. Afterwards, Adebayo discovers with Chris's X-ray helmet that Murn is a Butterfly, he realizes this and chases her down.
6	6	"Murn After Reading"	James Gunn	James Gunn	February 3, 2022
Harcourt tells Adebayo that she and Economos know Murn's Butterfly identity, but refuse to tell Waller, distrusting her. Murn tells Adebayo that the Butterflies came from a dying planet and are trying to conquer Earth, led by Goff's Butterfly, with Murn being the sole dissenter. Song obtains an arrest warrant for Chris and releases Auggie from prison. After being warned of the oncoming arrest raid by Murn, Chris and Adrian sneak away from Chris's home, but Song follows. Adrian accidentally breaks the jar containing Goff's Butterfly; it enters Song and takes over her brain. Locke acquires the planted fake diary and kills three officers, helping Chris, Adrian, and Eagly escape. Chris tells the team that Goff's Butterfly has taken over Song. Economos traces the Butterflies' activities to Coverdale Ranch, suspecting that an alien 'Cow' is mass-producing the Butterflies' food there. Butterfly-Song arranges for the Butterflies to take over all Evergreen prisoners and police officers, including Fitzgibbon and Locke. Using the fake diary, Butterfly-Locke publicly incriminates Chris as the killer of Sturphausen, the Glan Tai employees, Senator Goff and his family. Auggie reunites with his Aryan Empire followers and vows to kill Chris.
7	7	"Stop Dragon My Heart Around"	Brad Anderson	James Gunn	February 10, 2022
Chris remembers accidentally killing his brother when Auggie made them fight in front of others while collecting bets. As a wanted man, Chris hurriedly sets out with Eagly, Adrian, and Economos to kill the Cow, but is tracked down and attacked by the suited Auggie and his followers. Adrian and Economos kill Auggie's followers as Auggie fights Chris. Chris blames Auggie for his brother's death before shooting him dead. Harcourt confronts Adebayo on her betraying Chris. Adebayo admits it and mentions being Waller's daughter and wanting to leave the team. Butterfly-Locke leads the Butterfly-officers to invade Murn's apartment, where Butterfly-Song shoots Murn's body and kills Murn's Butterfly. Judomaster escapes and attacks Harcourt and Adebayo, who incapacitate him. The team reunites at a veterinary clinic where Eagly recovers. Seeing Chris pray for Eagly, Adebayo decides to remain with the team. Without Murn, the team appoints Harcourt as their new leader. To defeat the Butterflies, the team intends to starve them by killing their Cow before the Butterflies can teleport it to another location. During the drive to Coverdale Ranch, Adebayo apologizes to Chris, but he indicates that their friendship is over.
8	8	"It's Cow or Never"	James Gunn	James Gunn	February 17, 2022
Chris says his killings are aimed at preventing future meaningless deaths, while Adebayo advises him to not define himself by his accidental killing of his brother. The team reaches Coverdale Ranch; Adebayo asks Waller for backup, but none can come immediately. Entering the barn, Chris, Harcourt and Adrian fight and kill many Butterflies, including Butterfly-Fitzgibbon. Harcourt and Adrian are wounded. Adebayo joins the fight and saves Harcourt. Needing Chris's help to teleport the Cow away, Butterfly-Song saves Chris from rubble and asks for his help, explaining that the Butterflies are protecting Earth from humans who prioritize profit over their own survival. Chris instead kills the Cow by launching Adebayo into it using his human torpedo helmet. Chris kills Butterfly-Locke. He shoots Song's body; Goff's Butterfly emerges. The Justice League arrives, too late to help. (Note: The Justice League is replaced with the Justice Gang in the second season via retroactive continuity.) Harcourt, Economos, and Adrian undergo medical treatment. Chris and Adebayo reconcile. Adebayo exposes Project Butterfly, Task Force X, and Waller's leadership of both to the press, clearing Chris and Adrian's names. Chris returns home with Eagly and Goff's Butterfly, who he feeds the last of his amber fluid. Chris hallucinates Auggie's presence.

== Cast and characters ==
=== Main ===
- John Cena as Chris Smith / Peacemaker:
  A jingoistic vigilante who believes in achieving peace at any cost. Showrunner James Gunn described Peacemaker as a "piece of shit" and a "superhero/supervillain/[the] world's biggest douchebag". Gunn did not want the series to remove Peacemaker's worst qualities, but attempted to explain some of them by exploring Peacemaker's relationship with his father. After Peacemaker killed Rick Flag in The Suicide Squad (2021), Flag's final words—"Peacemaker, what a joke"—have a big impact on him in the series.
- Danielle Brooks as Leota Adebayo:
  The daughter of A.R.G.U.S. leader Amanda Waller and a member of Project Butterfly. Gunn described her as a co-lead with a different political view from Peacemaker's, and said their friendship is the heart of the series because they are the only characters that like each other despite the differences in their personalities and backgrounds. Gunn added that both characters are defined by their parents. Adebayo is an original character created by Gunn, and her first name is taken from his mother.
- Freddie Stroma as Adrian Chase / Vigilante:
  A self-proclaimed crimefighter who looks up to Peacemaker like an older brother. Unlike his comic book depiction as a superhero, Peacemaker's Vigilante is a foolish sociopath, willing to kill any lawbreaker regardless of the severity of their crime. Gunn felt this approach was what a real-life vigilante would be like: "a guy who dresses up in a costume, and goes around and kills people he says are doing something wrong ... he's a sociopath, but he's got this sort of sweet aspect to him." Chris Conrad, who was originally cast as Vigilante, is uncredited for physically portraying the character in the opening credits, as well as in the first through fifth episodes, and part of the eighth episode.
- Chukwudi Iwuji as Clemson Murn:
  A mercenary and the leader of Project Butterfly who reports directly to Waller. He is revealed to be a Butterfly himself called Ik Nobe Lok. Iwuji explained that the original mercenary was a bad person, similar to Peacemaker at the start of the series, but Ik Nobe Lok who possessed Murn is trying to use his body for good by stopping the rest of the Butterflies. The actor developed a backstory for Murn since he does not exist in the comics, and vocal coach Kohli Calhoun helped develop the character's voice.
- Jennifer Holland as Emilia Harcourt:
  An A.R.G.U.S. agent who is assigned to Project Butterfly by Waller. Holland was grateful for the nuances that Gunn gave the character, but was concerned that she may come across as a "cold-hearted bitch"; she was glad that the character was not received this way. Holland was able to use her background in competitive gymnastics for the character's many fight scenes. Gunn said the television format meant the relationship that is developed between Harcourt and Peacemaker could be more nuanced than a film would have allowed, with it not being a "love relationship" but also "not not that either".
- Steve Agee as John Economos:
  An A.R.G.U.S. agent who provides tactical support for Project Butterfly. Agee reluctantly dyed his beard when first portraying the character in The Suicide Squad, and was not happy to do so again for Peacemaker. This is acknowledged within the series as a running joke about his dyed beard, which Cena felt was offensive and unfunny, and showed how much of a bully Peacemaker is. It leads to an emotional scene in the first-season finale where Economos reveals why he dyes his beard, and Cena said this moment allowed Peacemaker to reflect on his actions and realize the harm he had been doing with the jokes.
- Robert Patrick as August "Auggie" Smith / White Dragon:
  Peacemaker's racist father who supplies him with technology to aid his mission. Gunn said Auggie was a worse person than Peacemaker and a "lost cause", executive producer Peter Safran described him as "Archie Bunker on steroids", and Cena said he was the only character in the series who does not have a character arc and journey. Gunn noted that portraying a racist character was a delicate subject and something that HBO Max expressed some concern about. The White Dragon is not Peacemaker's father in the comics but it was always Gunn's intention to make that change when he added Peacemaker to The Suicide Squad.

=== Recurring ===
- Annie Chang as Sophie Song: an Evergreen police detective who investigates Peacemaker's activities. She becomes the new host of the Butterfly leader.
- Lochlyn Munro as Larry Fitzgibbon: Song's police partner
- Elizabeth Ludlow as Keeya Adebayo: Leota's wife
- Rizwan Manji as Jamil: a janitor who works at the hospital where Peacemaker was admitted
- Nhut Le as Judomaster: a bodyguard who specializes in martial arts and works for Senator Royland Goff. Gunn described him as a "dick that loves Cheetos".
- Christopher Heyerdahl as Caspar Locke: an associate of Murn who masquerades as the new Evergreen police captain to undermine Song's investigation

=== Guest ===
- Alison Araya as Amber Calcaterra: an Evergreen citizen and Evan's wife
- Lenny Jacobson as Evan Calcaterra: an Evergreen citizen and Amber's husband
- Antonio Cupo as Royland Goff: a United States Senator and the initial host of the Butterfly leader
- Mel Tuck as Auggie's elderly neighbor

Viola Davis reprises her DCEU film role as Amanda Waller in an uncredited cameo appearance, as do Jason Momoa as Aquaman and Ezra Miller as the Flash. Justice League members Superman and Wonder Woman also appear, portrayed by body doubles with their faces obscured. Additionally, Dee Bradley Baker voices Peacemaker's pet bald eagle, Eagly, and Stephen Blackehart voices Charlie the Gorilla.

== Production ==
=== Development ===
[Peacemaker is] not an evil person, he's just a bad guy. He seems sort of irredeemable in the film. But I think that there's more to him. We didn't get a chance to know him [in The Suicide Squad] in the way we get to know some of the other characters. And so that's what the whole show is about.

— Creator and showrunner James Gunn on why he wanted to make a spin-off series about Peacemaker

While completing work on The Suicide Squad (2021) in August 2020, during a COVID-19 lockdown, writer and director James Gunn began writing a spin-off television series centered on the origins of Peacemaker, a character portrayed by John Cena in the film. Gunn said he did this "mostly for fun", and mentioned the idea to The Suicide Squad producer Peter Safran as something he would like to pursue. When DC Films later asked Safran about developing a spin-off series based on The Suicide Squad, he knew that Gunn would say yes to making a Peacemaker series. There were initial discussions about what platform the series should be released through, with the pay television channel HBO and the streaming service HBO Max being two options. The series ultimately went to HBO Max, and Gunn felt this was because it was a new streaming service that needed content and was willing to give Gunn the budget he wanted for the series. DC Films president Walter Hamada later explained that the studio was working with the filmmakers of all its upcoming film slate to try create interconnected spin-off television series for HBO Max based on those films.

HBO Max ordered Peacemaker straight-to-series in September 2020, with Gunn writing all eight episodes of the first season and directing five of them. Gunn and Safran were set as executive producers, with Cena as co-executive producer. The season was produced by Gunn's Troll Court Entertainment and the Safran Company in conjunction with Warner Bros. Television. Matt Miller joined as an additional executive producer in December.

=== Writing ===
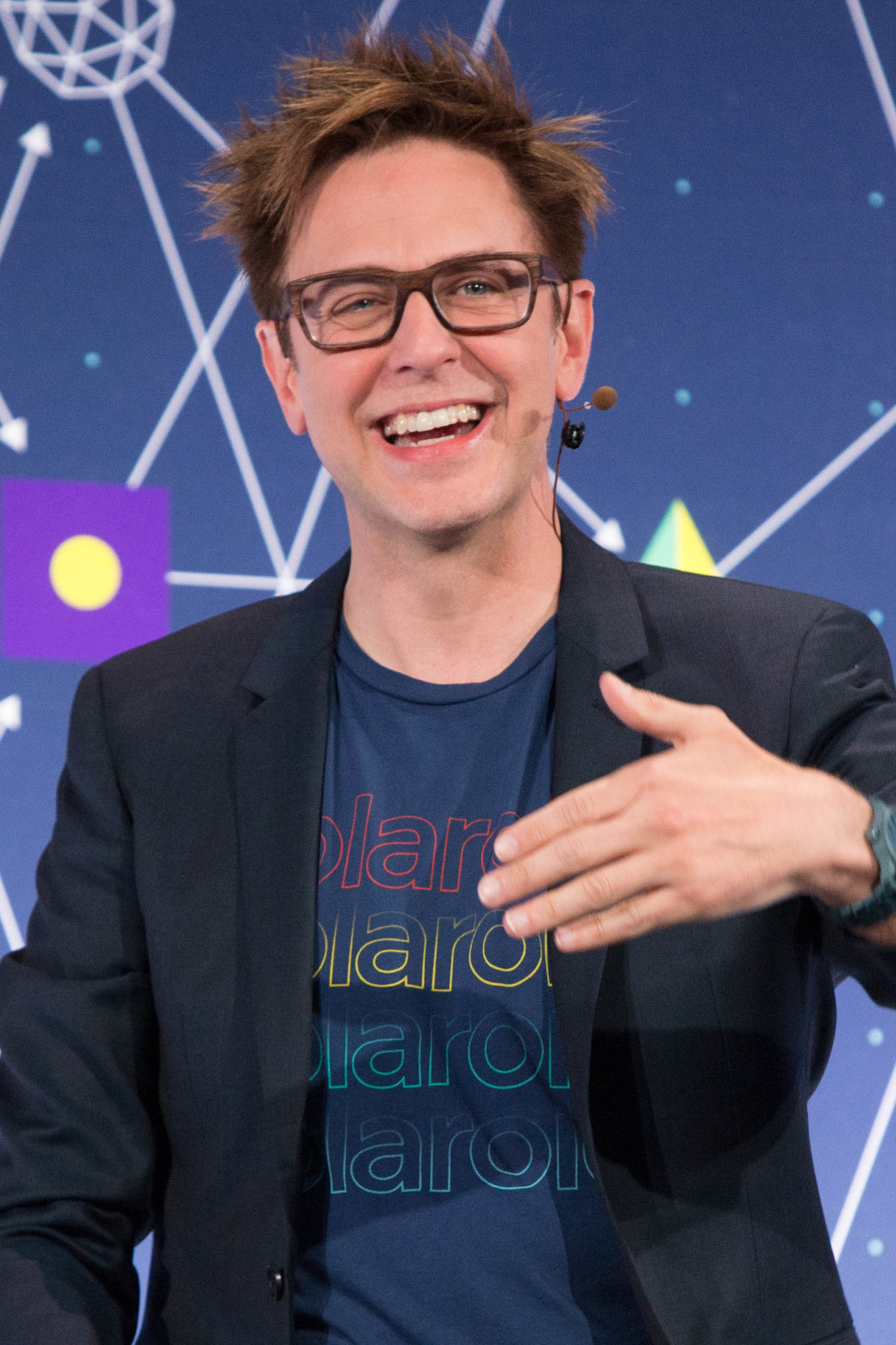
James Gunn created the season, wrote all of the episodes, and directed a majority of them.

During the filming of The Suicide Squad, particularly for the scene where Peacemaker attempts to kill Ratcatcher 2, Gunn came to feel that Cena was a much stronger dramatic actor than he was considered to be after previously being known primarily as a professional wrestler and comedic actor. Gunn felt he would be able to show more of this dramatic side to Cena in a story focused on Peacemaker, and also felt the character had not been explored or developed as much as other characters in The Suicide Squad. He eventually decided to write a television series starring the character. Gunn had never worked in television before and approached the project using his experience of writing film scripts and his knowledge of television series that he had seen. He saw the difference between film and television as the former needing to be "more cut and dried" due to the limited runtime while the latter has more time to explore complicated characters and relationships. A particular influence was the AMC series Better Call Saul (2015–2022), with Gunn drawing parallels between that series' protagonist, Saul Goodman, and Peacemaker.

Gunn took eight weeks to write the first season, during a break between his work on The Suicide Squad and Marvel Studios' Marvel Cinematic Universe (MCU) film Guardians of the Galaxy Vol. 3 (2023). He mostly wrote it in order, with the first two sequences he came up with on the first day of writing being the opening hospital scene and the dance number that is the opening title sequence. Peacemaker extends the world that Gunn built for The Suicide Squad, taking place after the film's post-credit scene which reveals that Peacemaker survived an apparently fatal gunshot wound from earlier in the film. Gunn said the series was an opportunity to explore current world issues through the title character, and to expand on his relationship with his father that is hinted at in the film. He said the story of the first season was about Peacemaker coming to terms with the difference between his ideals and who he actually is, with the character realizing that his identity is based on his childhood trauma and his treatment by his father. Gunn was not sure initially if the character would choose to fight or join the villains at the end of the season, but realized while making it that the series lent itself to being a redemption story. He did not want the villains, the Butterflies, to have a goal that was "thoroughly evil" and instead decided that they wanted to save humanity, despite being "mind-controlling aliens", from its "anti-science" mindset and populist leaders. Gunn said the "anti-science" line was more of a reference to climate change deniers than anti-vaxxers since debates about the COVID-19 vaccine were only just beginning when the season was being made. The scenes in which Peacemaker and Vigilante have an "elaborate target practice" where they shoot and blow-up things in the woods was inspired by Gunn doing similar things with his friends as a child. Gunn added a post-credits scene to the end of each episode as a way to reward fans who watched the full credits every time, with each scene featuring unused footage from the episode. He compared the idea of having a joke after the credits to the end scenes of the animated series Rick and Morty (2013–present).

Like The Suicide Squad, the series features graphic violence and profanity, and HBO Max gave Gunn some notes on the abundant use of the word "fuck" as well as a specific moment in the sixth episode that they were concerned about but that Gunn insisted on keeping. Other notes that Gunn received included questions about his references to certain characters, for instance Bat-Mite who is now canonically part of the DCEU due to this series referencing him. Gunn acknowledged these questions but was mostly able to make the references that he wanted to make and was never required to make any specific connections to other projects or set up future DCEU stories. Gunn did say that a character from the series would appear in an upcoming DCEU film, and the fourth episode includes a newspaper headline about the Intergang's activities in Kahndaq, referencing the events of Black Adam (2022). Members of the Justice League also make cameo appearances in the season finale, which caused some concerns for Warner Bros. due to the ramifications it had for the DCEU, but the company ultimately allowed it.

=== Casting ===
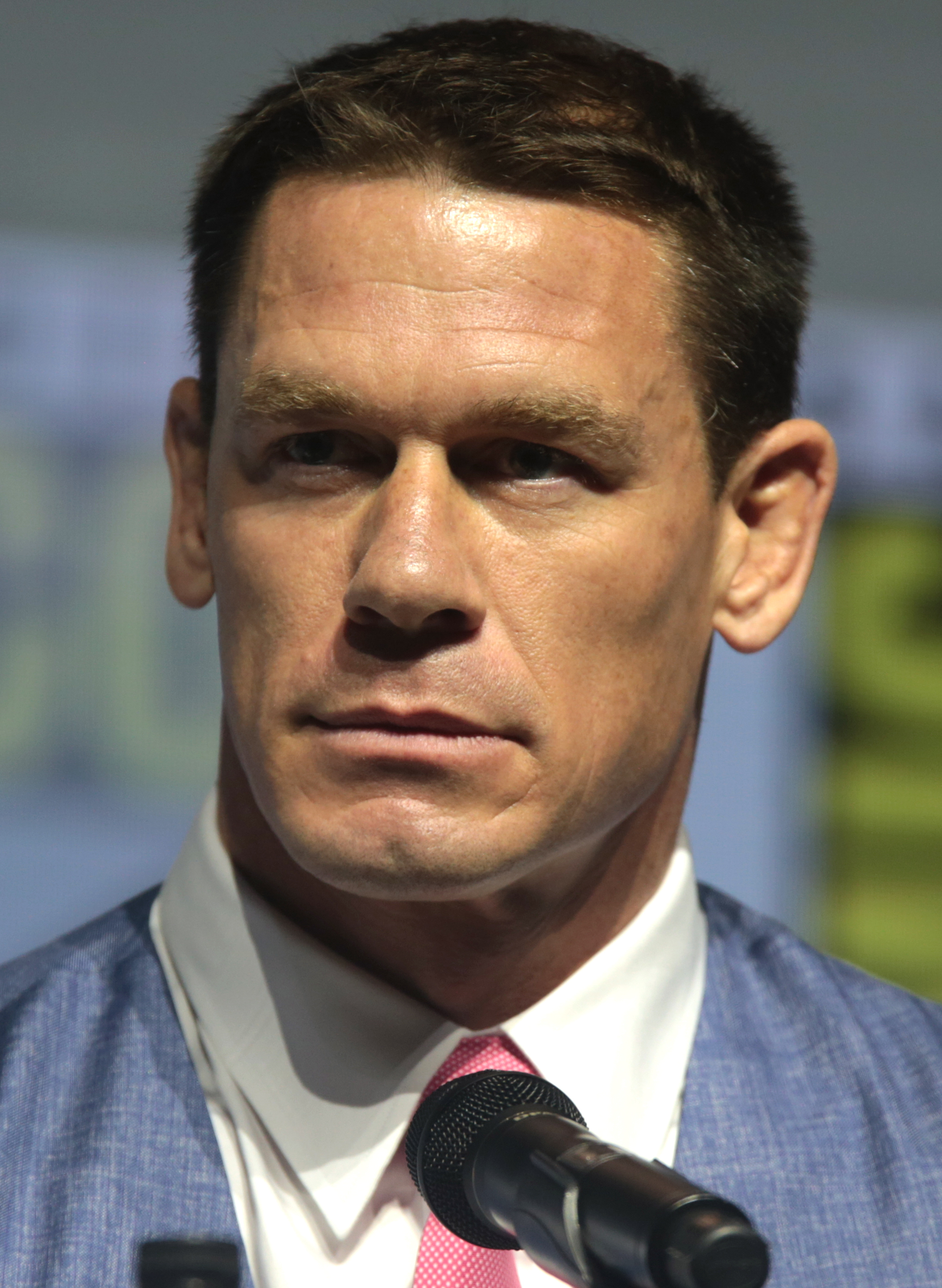
John Cena stars in the title role, returning from The Suicide Squad.

With the series order in September 2020, John Cena was confirmed to be reprising his role as Peacemaker from The Suicide Squad. The next month, Gunn's close friend Steve Agee joined the series as John Economos, also returning from the film. In November, Gunn's girlfriend Jennifer Holland joined as her The Suicide Squad character Emilia Harcourt, alongside Danielle Brooks as Leota Adebayo, Robert Patrick as Auggie Smith, and Chris Conrad as Adrian Chase / Vigilante. Holland was surprised that Gunn brought her character back for the series, believing that her part in The Suicide Squad would be a short one-off role. Chukwudi Iwuji joined the cast as Clemson Murn in December. Gunn wrote the role for Lance Reddick, who wanted to play the part but was unable to due to a schedule conflict. One of Gunn's favorite parts of making the series was being able to work closely with Holland and Agee, and he soon became close friends with other members of the cast as well. He felt Iwuji gave the best performance of the season and went on to cast him as the High Evolutionary in Guardians of the Galaxy Vol. 3.

Several recurring guests were also cast in December: Lochlyn Munro as Larry Fitzgibbon, Annie Chang as Detective Sophie Song, and Christopher Heyerdahl as Captain Locke. Munro was cast after Gunn saw his audition and remembered that Munro had been one of his choices for the role of Shaggy Rogers in Scooby-Doo (2002) prior to Matthew Lillard's casting for that film. In February 2021, several more recurring roles were cast: Elizabeth Ludlow as Keeya, Rizwan Manji as Jamil, Nhut Le as Judomaster, and Alison Araya and Lenny Jacobson as the couple Amber and Evan. In late May, Freddie Stroma was cast to replace Conrad as Adrian Chase / Vigilante, after Conrad left the series due to creative differences. The series' premiere revealed that Viola Davis reprises her DCEU role as Amanda Waller, while Dee Bradley Baker voices Peacemaker's pet bald eagle, Eagly, after also voicing Ratcatcher 2's pet rat Sebastian in The Suicide Squad. Stephen Blackehart, who made cameo appearances in many of Gunn's previous films including The Suicide Squad, voices the possessed gorilla Charlie.

Gunn knew the series did not have the budget to allow the Justice League to fight in the final battle, so he always intended for them to "show up late". He also did not expect the actual Justice League actors to reprise their roles in the series, other than Jason Momoa as Arthur Curry / Aquaman. Gunn had known Momoa for a long time and Safran produced the DCEU Aquaman films, so they talked to Momoa early on and revealed that Peacemaker would claim that Aquaman "fucks fish" as a running joke in the series. Momoa thought this was funny and agreed to appear. Gunn later heard that Ezra Miller was a fan of his films and contacted the actor about reprising their role as Barry Allen / The Flash. The other Justice League members—Clark Kent / Superman, Diana Prince / Wonder Woman, Bruce Wayne / Batman, and Victor Stone / Cyborg—were portrayed by body doubles. Warner Bros. later asked for Batman and Cyborg to be removed, which Gunn said may have been due to planned DCEU projects.

=== Filming ===
By early November 2020, Gunn had arrived in Canada for a two-week quarantine before starting production on the series. Filming began on January 15, 2021, in Vancouver, Canada, under the working title The Scriptures, with Michael Bonvillain serving as cinematographer. Gunn chose to film in Vancouver because he wanted the series to be set in the Pacific Northwest, and because he felt the production would be safer there because Canada was managing the pandemic better than the United States. Gunn directed five of the series' episodes, with Jody Hill, Rosemary Rodriguez, and Brad Anderson each directing one.

One of the first scenes that the production filmed was the post-credits scene for The Suicide Squad that sets up the beginning of Peacemaker. Davis's first appearance as Waller in the series is on a Zoom call, but rather than have her make a Zoom call to the set in Vancouver, the production went to Davis in Los Angeles to film her part. The first five episodes were filmed first, and Conrad had already filmed five-and-a-half episodes as Vigilante when he left the series. Gunn re-shot all of those scenes with Stroma after the latter was hired to replace Conrad, at the same time as the last three episodes were filmed. The sixth episode was filmed last because Gunn initially did not plan to direct it himself, but ultimately he "couldn't let it go" and it became his favorite episode of the season. Filming for the first seven episodes took around 12 to 15 days each, and the finale took 21 or 22 days. This was mostly due to the finale requiring night shooting for which there was limited filming time each night. Production on the first season lasted 131 days total, and wrapped on July 11. Gunn later filmed Miller's cameo as the Flash on the set of Guardians of the Galaxy Vol. 3 with that film's crew. Marvel allowed this as a favor to DC since Iwuji's screen test for Vol. 3 was filmed on the set of Peacemaker with the series' crew.

=== Title sequence ===
External videos
- Peacemaker | Opening Credits | HBO Max presents the series' opening titles dance sequence featuring the song "Do Ya Wanna Taste It" by Wig Wam, YouTube video from HBO Max's channel

Gunn wrote the dance number for the series' opening titles into the script because he thought it would be funny, and because he wanted to tell the audience that this would be different from other superhero television series and they should expect to be surprised. The script describes the dance sequence as "the greatest opening credits scene of all time" and "the weirdest dance you've ever seen and everyone in it is completely and 100 percent serious". Gunn hoped that people would be interested enough in the sequence that they would not use the "Skip Intro" button that streaming services use since he felt it was important that viewers see the names of everyone who worked on the series.

The dance number was filmed in the middle of the series' filming schedule over one day in a high school auditorium. It features the series' main cast as well as guest stars from several episodes, including Rizwan Manji who traveled to Canada and went through two weeks of quarantine for a third time just to be in the sequence. Gunn had originally planned for the sequence to be set in the Project Butterfly headquarters but they found it to be too small during rehearsals. When they located the auditorium, he asked production designer Lisa Soper to dress it like a 1970s variety show set. They eventually found that this also did not work and instead moved towards more 1980s designs, such as those used by the band Kraftwerk. Gunn wanted the dancing to be outlandish and robotic, but he wanted all of the actors to do it very seriously and stoically, as he felt that reflected the balance of seriousness and silliness that the series has. Gunn hired choreographer Charissa-Lee Barton to help him plan the sequence, and only found out later that she was married to actor Alan Tudyk, who performed many of the actions for Barton while she choreographed the dance. Tudyk also stood-in as Peacemaker during rehearsal when Cena was not available.

Sarofsky, the company behind the onscreen titles for The Suicide Squad, provided the typography for the Peacemaker opening sequence. The company took inspiration from the series' hair metal soundtrack by researching band logos and concert posters for the genre. They found many of these to be "nearly illegible", and needed a font that evoked the style while being readable for the audience. The font New Zelek was ultimately chosen, as it has "the angular, geometric feel we were looking for and the letterforms are clear and familiar enough that one can read the words effortlessly". The letters are pink and blue neon to match the sequence's production design.

=== Editing ===
Each episode begins with a recap, including the first which has a recap of the events of The Suicide Squad. This includes a moment that was removed from the film, in which Flo Crawley, an aide of Waller's who knocked her out during the final fight, is arrested. Gunn said this was not necessary to see for the ending of the film, but was included in the recap for Peacemaker because it explained why the character was not included on the team with Waller's other aides Harcourt and Economos. Sarofsky applied the same title treatment as the opening sequence to the "previously on" title cards as well as the episode titles.

=== Visual effects ===
After having a difficult time with the visual effects-heavy character King Shark in The Suicide Squad, Gunn said creating Eagly for Peacemaker was a lot easier. Weta Digital, who worked on King Shark, provided the visual effects for Eagly and based the animated model on an existing one that the company had previously used. The series' camera crew often needed to be digitally removed from the reflections on Peacemaker's helmet.

=== Music ===
External audio
- Peacemaker Official Playlist presents all of the songs that are heard in the season, Spotify playlist created by James Gunn

Gunn revealed in June 2021 that Clint Mansell and Kevin Kiner were composing the score for the season, after The Suicide Squad composer John Murphy was busy writing the score for Gunn's Guardians of the Galaxy Vol. 3. Murphy did perform and produce a cover of Foster the People's "Pumped Up Kicks", featuring Ralph Saenz, for the season. This was released as a single on January 9, 2022. The following day, Gunn released a Spotify playlist featuring songs from the season; it initially just covered the first three episodes, including Murphy's version of "Pumped Up Kicks", but Gunn planned to update the playlist with the release of each subsequent episode.

Like with his feature films, Gunn selected all of the songs for the season himself and wrote them into the script. He chose the hair metal genre of music because he thought it was what Peacemaker would listen to, and because he had spent the last few years exploring it after previously not being a fan. He was excited to bring those songs, including some from new and unknown bands, to a new audience like he had done with pre-1980s pop music on the soundtrack for Guardians of the Galaxy (2014). The season's opening title sequence features the song "Do Ya Wanna Taste It" by Wig Wam. Gunn gave playlists of hair metal songs to Mansell and Kiner as inspiration for the score, and discussed the "unapologetically melodic ballads" written by those bands. Mansell developed the "broad strokes" of the music and Kiner fleshed out those ideas. The latter described their music for the season as a mixture of rock, orchestra, and choir, and compared it to the work of bands Queen and Cinderella; Fred Coury, a drummer for Cinderella, contributed to the score. The main theme for Peacemaker is primarily played on electric guitar, even for more emotional moments that traditionally would use piano. Kiner felt they created a score that was unique to the series and title character.

During filming for The Suicide Squad in Panama, Gunn learned that his dog was about to die. He said this was one of the saddest days of his life, and he decided to fly home to see the dog while he still could. When Gunn was waiting to be taken to the airport, Cena played a version of Pixies' "Where Is My Mind?" on piano. Gunn said, "It crushed me and yet soothed me and everyone around me was crying", and he wanted to try capture that moment in Peacemaker with a scene where the title character plays a piano and expresses himself as an artist for the first time. In the scene, Cena plays a cover of Mötley Crüe's "Home Sweet Home", which was arranged by Murphy and released as a single on February 4. A soundtrack album featuring Mansell and Kiner's score, as well as Murphy's "Pumped Up Kicks" cover and Cena's "Home Sweet Home" cover, was released on February 18.

All music is composed by Clint Mansell and Kevin Kiner, except where noted.

Peacemaker (Soundtrack from the HBO Max Original Series)
No.	Title	Artist(s)	Length
1.	"Peacemaker Discharged"		3:28
2.	"Adebayo"		3:10
3.	"Butterflies"		3:40
4.	"Cops on the Move"		5:56
5.	"Vigilante"		2:16
6.	"Berenstain Bears"		5:27
7.	"Judomaster"		5:24
8.	"X-Ray Vision"		2:09
9.	"Tossing the Trailer"		5:17
10.	"Auggie"		4:08
11.	"Peacemaker Confronts His Demon"		3:00
12.	"Eagly"		5:05
13.	"Sonic Boom Helmet"		3:22
14.	"Holy Cow"		3:52
15.	"I'm Made for This Shit"		5:23
16.	"Peacemaker Rock Theme Jam"		2:59
17.	"Pumped Up Kicks (feat. Ralph Saenz)"	John Murphy	3:25
18.	"Home Sweet Home (Piano Version)"	John Cena	2:06
Total length:			1:10:00

== Marketing ==
The first teaser trailer for the series was released during the virtual DC FanDome event in October 2021, along with some behind-the-scenes footage. Commentators discussed the comedic tone of the teaser, feeling it was consistent with Gunn and Cena's work on The Suicide Squad, and also noted the hints that Brooks' Leota could help Peacemaker become a better person during the series. Peacemaker's pet bald eagle, Eagly, was also a highlight from the teaser. From January 6 to May 27, 2022, the Warner Bros. Studio Tour Hollywood was updated to feature props and costumes from the season, including a life-sized version of Eagly. As he did while promoting The Suicide Squad, Cena decided to wear the Peacemaker costume for some interviews and other promotional events as a way to familiarize the audience with the lesser-known character.

== Release ==
The season premiered on HBO Max on January 13, 2022, with its first three episodes. The other five were released weekly through February 17. The season was released in the United Kingdom on March 22, on Sky Max and Now. It was released on Blu-ray and DVD in the U.S. on November 22. The home media release includes all eight episodes, a gag reel, and various featurettes about the making of the season.

== Reception ==
=== Viewership ===
According to Whip Media, who track viewership data for the 19 million worldwide users of their TV Time app, Peacemaker was the most anticipated new series of January 2022. Variety also named it one of the 40 most anticipated series of 2022. Analytics company Samba TV, which gathers viewership data from certain Smart TVs and content providers, reported that 638,000 U.S. households watched the first episode over its first four days of release. This was considerably lower than their estimates for two recent series on rival streaming service Disney+: The Book of Boba Fett (1.7 million U.S. households in its first five days) and Hawkeye (1.5 million U.S. households during its launch). Whip Media calculated that Peacemaker was the third-highest original streaming series for U.S. viewership during the week it premiered, behind The Book of Boba Fett and Netflix's Cobra Kai. It remained in that position on the chart for the next two weeks, dropped to fourth place for the weeks that the sixth and seventh episodes were released, and ended in second place during the week of the season finale.

JustWatch, a guide to streaming content with access to data from more than 20 million users around the world, estimated that Peacemaker was the second- or third-most watched streaming series in the U.S. for each week of its release, behind Paramount Network's Yellowstone, Showtime's Yellowjackets, and Apple TV+'s Severance on different weeks. Parrot Analytics determines audience "demand expressions" based on various data sources, including video streaming, social media activity, photo sharing, comments on fan and critic rating platforms, downloading and streaming on file sharing sites, and blogging. During the week of the series' debut, the company calculated that for U.S. streaming series it was the fifty-second-most in demand. It moved up to seventh place the next week, and remained in the top ten for the rest of its run. It was calculated to be the fourth-most in demand streaming series in the U.S. during the week of the season finale, with Parrot saying it was 33.7 times more in demand than the average series. Globally, the company said Peacemaker was the most in-demand series in the world a week after its debut, ahead of popular series such as The Book of Boba Fett and Netflix's The Witcher. Parrot calculated that, globally, Peacemaker was 69.5 times more in demand than the average series.

On Variety's "Trending TV" chart—which looks at weekly audience engagement based on Twitter mentions, retweets, and likes—the series appeared in the top ten for each week that a new episode was released, starting in second place with 295,000 engagements behind HBO's Euphoria which had 440,000. It was first place for the first time during the week of the season finale, with nearly 700,000 engagements. The site said this "blew away the TV competition", with Euphoria being the next closest series that week with around 460,000 engagements. Deadline Hollywood reported that each episode of Peacemaker received higher viewership than the last, and HBO Max stated that the season finale's viewership was 44 percent higher than the series premiere's. According to the service, the finale broke the record for highest single day viewership of an HBO Max original episode. In the UK, where Peacemaker was not released until after it had finished airing in the U.S., the series was the third-most pirated for the first quarter of 2022 after Euphoria and The Book of Boba Fett.

=== Critical response ===
On the review aggregator website Rotten Tomatoes, 93% of 90 critics' reviews are positive. The website's consensus reads: "John Cena's still in solid form as Peacemaker, leading a bloody good time that gives writer-director James Gunn full permission to let his freak flag fly." Metacritic, which uses a weighted average, assigned the season a score of 70 out of 100, based on 26 critics, indicating "generally favorable" reviews. The title sequence was praised, with critics also highlighting Gunn's sense of fun and "raunchy humor", and Cena's performance. Some found other characters and story elements to be underdeveloped.

IGN gave the first three episodes 8 out of 10, saying that "The three-episode premiere offers a goofy takedown of vigilantism" while praising the cast's performances and humor. The Guardian gave the first three episodes a score of 3 out of 5 writing "James Gunn's Suicide Squad character gets his own HBO Max series with mixed results but a winning central performance."

=== Accolades ===
Agee was named TVLine's "Performer of the Week" for the season finale, especially for his emotional monologue about why Economos dyes his beard. The site also noted the performances in the episode of Chang, Brooks, Holland, and Cena, with the latter also being named an honorable mention for "Performer of the Week" for the previous episode, specifically for the scenes where Peacemaker kills his father and prays for Eagly.

Award	Date of ceremony	Category	Recipient(s)	Result	Ref.
Annie Awards	February 25, 2023	Outstanding Achievement for Character Animation in a Live Action Production	Michael Cozens, Mark Smith, Kai-Hua Lan, Selene McLean and Richard John Moore	Nominated	
Critics' Choice Super Awards	March 16, 2023	Best Superhero Series, Limited Series or Made-For-TV Movie	Peacemaker	Nominated	
Critics' Choice Super Awards	March 16, 2023	Best Actor in a Superhero Series, Limited Series or Made-For-TV Movie	John Cena	Nominated	
Critics' Choice Super Awards	March 16, 2023	Best Actress in a Superhero Series, Limited Series or Made-For-TV Movie	Danielle Brooks	Nominated	
Hollywood Critics Association TV Awards	August 14, 2022	Best Actor in a Streaming Series, Comedy	John Cena	Nominated	
Hollywood Critics Association TV Awards	August 14, 2022	Best Writing in a Streaming Series, Comedy	James Gunn (for "It's Cow or Never")	Nominated	
MTV Movie & TV Awards	June 5, 2022	Best Comedic Performance	John Cena	Nominated	
MTV Movie & TV Awards	June 5, 2022	Best Musical Moment	"Do Ya Wanna Taste It?"	Nominated	
Primetime Creative Arts Emmy Awards	September 4, 2022	Outstanding Stunt Coordination for a Comedy Series or Variety Program	Wayne Dalglish and Gaston Morrison	Nominated	
Saturn Awards	October 25, 2022	Best Action / Adventure Series (Streaming)	Peacemaker	Nominated	
Saturn Awards	October 25, 2022	Best Supporting Actress in a Streaming Series	Danielle Brooks	Nominated	
