= Better Goff Dead =

- Peacemaker episode
- Episode no.: Season 1 Episode 3
- Directed by: James Gunn
- Written by: James Gunn
- Cinematography by: Michael Bonvillain
- Editing by: Fred Raskin
- Original air date: January 13, 2022
- Running time: 39 minutes

Episode chronology
← Previous "Best Friends, For Never"	Next → "The Choad Less Traveled"
- Peacemaker season 1

"Better Goff Dead" is the third episode of the American black comedy superhero drama television series Peacemaker, a spin-off from the 2021 film The Suicide Squad. The episode was written and directed by series creator James Gunn. It originally aired on HBO Max on January 13, 2022, alongside "A Whole New Whirled" and "Best Friends, For Never".

The series is set after the events of The Suicide Squad, and follows Chris Smith / Peacemaker. Smith returns to his home but is forced to work with A.R.G.U.S. agents on a classified operation only known as "Project Butterfly". Smith also has to deal with his personal demons, including feeling haunted by memories of people he killed for "peace", as well as reconnecting with his estranged father. In the episode, the team prepares for their assassination target, where Smith learns more about the suspected "Butterflies".

The episode received positive reviews from critics, who praised the action sequences, directing, character development and performances.

== Plot ==
Chris Smith / Peacemaker informs his teammates Clemson Murn, Leota Adebayo, John Economos and Emilia Harcourt about the small spaceship he discovered. They spot Vigilante watching them and persuade him to leave. Murn reveals the team's first mission: help Peacemaker assassinate United States Senator Royland Goff, a 'Butterfly'. Murn instructs Peacemaker to also kill Goff's wife and children if they are Butterflies, but Peacemaker hesitates at killing children. Peacemaker asks what a Butterfly is, but Murn declines to explain. Murn later tells Economos of his distrust of Peacemaker; Murn also speaks of atoning for his own checkered past.

The team conducts a stakeout outside the Goff household. The family arrives with two bodyguards, including Judomaster. When Goff's other bodyguard blocks a shot on Goff, Murn disallows shooting, as the bodyguards may not be Butterflies. The family enters the house, delaying the assassination. Waiting, Peacemaker chats with Harcourt, stating that his father Auggie led him to being a killer. Vigilante appears, having followed the team; Murn allows him to stay to avoid compromising the mission. The family gathers in the dining room, presenting a clear shot. Murn recognizes that the family are Butterflies when they take out a honey-like liquid, which they feed on using proboscis-like tongues. Murn orders Peacemaker to kill the entire family, but Peacemaker freezes, unable to shoot. Seeing this, Vigilante replaces Peacemaker, killing Goff's wife and children, but before Goff can be shot, Judomaster attacks and incapacitates Vigilante, Peacemaker and Harcourt. Goff's other bodyguard holds Harcourt at gunpoint, and is in turn held at gunpoint by Adebayo. Harcourt urges Adebayo to execute the bodyguard to protect the team; Harcourt kills him when Adebayo hesitates.

Goff and Judomaster kidnap Peacemaker and Vigilante into the house's basement. Goff sends Judomaster away to inform 'Glan Tai' what happened. Economos, who was ordered by Murn to prevent any escapees, rams Judomaster's car and then bludgeons Judomaster unconscious. Goff unmasks Vigilante, who Peacemaker recognizes as Adrian Chase. Goff demands information from Peacemaker, but fails to get any, even after torturing Vigilante via electrocution and cutting his pinky toe. Murn, Harcourt and Adebayo use an explosive to access the basement; the explosion blasts Murn back, but he is largely unharmed. The explosion blasts Peacemaker forward; he escapes from his bonds, fights Goff and shoots Goff's face, killing him. A butterfly-like alien emerges from Goff's head. The team's computer show thousands of suspected Butterflies worldwide.

== Production ==
=== Development ===
In July 2021, the episode's title was revealed as "Better Goff Dead".

=== Casting ===
In February 2021, Nhut Le would portray Judomaster in the series as a recurring role, with the episode marking his debut in the series.

== Critical reception ==
"Better Goff Dead" received positive reviews from critics. Samantha Nelson of IGN gave the three-episode premiere a "great" 8 out of 10 rating and wrote in his verdict, "Peacemaker isn't quite as sharply written as Amazon's The Boys, but James Gunn is aiming for the same sort of subversive superhero show, using excessive violence and biting humor to deconstruct the failings of the genre. The three-episode premiere offers a goofy takedown of vigilantism while hinting at bigger and darker plots to come."

Jarrod Jones of The A.V. Club gave the three-episode premiere an "A–" grade and wrote, "Peacemaker is a stacked deck of fearsome insanity and there's a lot to accept in these first three episodes. It's vulgar, violent, prone to non sequitur, and has more than one dance sequence in store for you. But don't you dare let its ceaseless barrage of profanity, nudity, and slaughter dupe you into thinking otherwise: James Gunn's Peacemaker comes packing, among other things, a beating heart."

Alan Sepinwall of Rolling Stone gave the three-episode premiere a 4 star rating out of 5 and wrote, "Between the blood and guts, the slapstick, the political satire, and the musical digressions, there is a lot going on here. Yet the series functions as a sincere character study of its flawed hero — and the unfortunate souls who have to work alongside him — just enough for the joke to never quite wear thin. Even in a wildly oversaturated market for tales of hypermuscular men and women punching their way to justice, Peacemaker stands out. You'll wanna taste it, even the parts that are in incredibly bad taste." Alec Bojalad of Den of Geek gave the three-episode premiere a 4 star rating out of 5 and wrote, "Ultimately, Peacemaker is another win for the suddenly surprisingly competitive DC Comics TV landscape."
