= Murn After Reading =

- Peacemaker episode
- Episode no.: Season 1 Episode 6
- Directed by: James Gunn
- Written by: James Gunn
- Cinematography by: Sam McCurdy
- Editing by: Greg D'Auria
- Original air date: February 3, 2022
- Running time: 46 minutes

Episode chronology
← Previous "Monkey Dory"	Next → "Stop Dragon My Heart Around"
- Peacemaker season 1

"Murn After Reading" is the sixth episode of the American black comedy superhero drama television series Peacemaker, a spin-off from the 2021 film The Suicide Squad. The episode was written and directed by series creator James Gunn. It originally aired on HBO Max on February 3, 2022.

The series is set after the events of The Suicide Squad, and follows Chris Smith / Peacemaker. Smith returns to his home but is forced to work with A.R.G.U.S. agents on a classified operation only known as "Project Butterfly". Smith also has to deal with his personal demons, including feeling haunted by memories of people he killed for "peace", as well as reconnecting with his estranged father. In the episode, Auggie is released from prison, while the police start looking for Smith. Meanwhile, Murn reveals his true nature to the team.

The episode received critical acclaim, with critics praising the revelations, character development, performances and Gunn's directing.

== Plot ==
Clemson Murn tries to calm Leota Adebayo. Emilia Harcourt arrives and reveals that Murn admitted his Butterfly identity when she confronted him after an explosive detonated and he took little damage, (Note: As depicted in Better Goff Dead.) but she and John Economos never told Amanda Waller due to distrust. Murn explains that the Butterflies came from a dying planet. Led by Goff's Butterfly, the Butterflies decided to conquer Earth, while the only dissenter, Murn's Butterfly, took over the murderous Murn to try and stop them. Now, Murn wants to find the Butterflies' food source, a 'Cow', before it is moved.

Auggie Smith is released from prison, as Detectives Sophie Song and Larry Fitzgibbon obtained an arrest warrant for Chris Smith / Peacemaker from a judge, against Captain Caspar Locke's wishes. Auggie reunites with his Aryan Empire followers, wears his White Dragon costume, and vows to kill Peacemaker, his son.

Peacemaker visits schoolchildren on janitor Jamil's behalf, and thinks about his brother's death when asked about his "origin story". One schoolgirl alleges that Peacemaker fathered her. Peacemaker returns home, joined by Adrian Chase / Vigilante, where Goff's Butterfly writes a peace symbol. Murn forwards Locke's warning about Song's impending police raid to Peacemaker and Vigilante. They sneak away as the police enter Peacemaker's home, but Song spots Peacemaker's pet Eagly and follows them. Vigilante accidentally breaks the jar holding Goff's Butterfly, which enters Song's mouth and takes over her brain. Peacemaker, Vigilante and Eagly fend off chasing officers; Locke saves them by killing three officers and providing a getaway car, which disturbs Peacemaker. An officer finds the planted diary in Peacemaker's home; Locke keeps it, informing Murn.

Murn tells the team about the fake diary; Adebayo feels guilty but does not reveal that she planted it. Peacemaker tells to the team he kept Goff's Butterfly alive, which took over Song. Economos traces the Butterflies' activities to Coverdale Ranch, where their Cow is likely to be. Peacemaker is angered by Locke executing officers, and the team never telling him about the Cow before. Peacemaker tells Harcourt that he no longer wishes to kill humans, but he will kill Butterflies.

Butterfly-Song allows the Butterflies to invade the police station and prison, taking over all the prisoners and police officers, including Fitzgibbon and Locke. Vigilante shows Peacemaker a televised press conference where Butterfly-Locke uses the planted diary to blame Peacemaker for the killings of Annie Sturphausen, the Glan Tai employees, Senator Royland Goff and his family, leaving Peacemaker to be targeted by American police.

== Production ==
=== Development ===
In January 2021, James Gunn confirmed that the episode's title would be "Murn After Reading".

=== Writing ===
Before the episode aired, Gunn teased the level of violence in the episode, "There was one moment they were afraid of us showing that comes in Episode 6 that I pretty much insisted on keeping".

On the concept of Auggie using the "White Dragon" suit, Gunn said, "He is really a piece of shit. It's a real thing in our world, it's a real thing in our life. And to, kind of, do these sort of McDonald's versions of white supremacy that happen in these types of tales seems inauthentic to me. So I decided to just let him be what he is, which is a racist piece of shit". Actor Robert Patrick commented, "That was really, really exciting. I have to be honest with you, to be fit with a suit and to realise that I was going to be a supervillain was just, I was so excited for that. [...] And, you know, the suits are not cheap, they're expensive, and it was one of the things I sweated [about] while we were doing the production was, you know, 'I can't get fat, I can't gain weight'".

=== Filming ===
While the episode was the sixth to air, it was the final episode to be filmed. The reasoning was that Gunn originally did not plan to direct the episode, but settled on to do it, deeming it his favorite episode.

== Reception ==
=== Critical reviews ===
"Murn After Reading" received critical acclaim. Samantha Nelson of IGN gave the episode an "amazing" 9 out of 10 rating and wrote in his verdict, "Project Butterfly experiences multiple major setbacks in a dramatic episode of Peacemaker filled with great plot twists. The actors are really showing their strengths in some deeply emotional scenes. Music and action pair together perfectly to deliver big thrills and set the stakes for the show's final conflicts."

Jarrod Jones of The A.V. Club gave the episode an "A" grade and wrote, "'Murn After Reading' marks James Gunn's return to the series as director after passing the baton to Jody Hill and Rosemary Rodriguez for the last two episodes. The result is the most cinematic installment of Peacemaker yet." Alec Bojalad of Den of Geek gave the episode a 4 star rating out of 5 and wrote, "Still, Gunn and the production team are so completely in control of the storytelling style that they've perfected that it seems impossible for the last quarter of this experience to not be fun. If nothing else, Vigilante might get to the bottom of whether Goff's butterfly likes teal."

=== Accolades ===
TVLine named Chukwudi Iwuji as an honorable mention as the "Performer of the Week" for the week of February 5, 2022, for his performance in the episode. The site wrote, "When Peacemaker's Adebayo realized that Murn was a Butterfly, one thing we did not expect to come out of the ensuing confrontation was such a moving performance by Chukwudi Iwuji. After Murn explained how the rest of his extraterrestrial kind had decided to take over humans in positions of power, Adebayo pointed out that he had stolen a life, as well. 'I needed to stop them!', Murn shot back. 'So I inhabited the worst person I could find', a former mercenary. 'This man, Leota... he's a murderer', he added, Iwiji's eyes registering both a certain shame and begging for understanding. 'He could have changed, and I took that from him... and every day I dread waking up to his memories.' It was Iwuji's most emotional work thus far (and by a long shot, as taciturn Murn), and it was worth the wait."
