= Best Friends, For Never =

- Peacemaker episode
- Episode no.: Season 1 Episode 2
- Directed by: James Gunn
- Written by: James Gunn
- Cinematography by: Michael Bonvillain
- Editing by: Fred Raskin; Todd Busch
- Original air date: January 13, 2022
- Running time: 40 minutes

Episode chronology
← Previous "A Whole New Whirled"	Next → "Better Goff Dead"
- Peacemaker season 1

"Best Friends, For Never" is the second episode of the American black comedy superhero drama television series Peacemaker, a spin-off from the 2021 film The Suicide Squad. The episode was written and directed by series creator James Gunn. It originally aired on HBO Max on January 13, 2022, alongside "A Whole New Whirled" and "Better Goff Dead".

The series is set after the events of The Suicide Squad, and follows Chris Smith / Peacemaker. Smith returns to his home but is forced to work with A.R.G.U.S. agents on a classified operation only known as "Project Butterfly". Smith also has to deal with his personal demons, including feeling haunted by memories of people he killed for "peace", as well as reconnecting with his estranged father. In the episode, Smith has to deal with the fallout of the events at the building, while Auggie is sent to prison to avoid incriminating evidence against Smith.

The episode received generally positive reviews from critics, who praised the humor and performances, although the pacing received some criticism.

== Plot ==
Chris Smith / Peacemaker calls Emilia Harcourt, saying that he killed the superpowered Annie Sturphausen, wrecking his car, after she attacked him. Harcourt tells Leota Adebayo that Chris killed a "Butterfly"; they drive to pick Peacemaker up. Peacemaker returns to Sturphausen's apartment to retrieve his belongings, and also takes an alien device he finds there. Evergreen's police, including Detectives Sophie Song and Larry Fitzgibbon, arrive at Sturphausen's apartment block to investigate the sonic boom. They chase Peacemaker after spotting him. Peacemaker flees into another apartment, taking troubled couple Evan and Amber Calcaterra hostage. Peacemaker bonds with Amber, then jumps out of the window and onto various balconies as Song and Fitzgibbon enter the apartment. When more police hold Peacemaker at gunpoint (but are unable to identify him), Harcourt shoots five officers with a tranquilizer gun. Adebayo drives Harcourt, Peacemaker and his pet Eagly to safety, despite Song and Fitzgibbon shooting at them.

Since Peacemaker's car was left at the crime scene, Clemson Murn orders technician John Economos to alter the car registration. In a rush, Economos changes the registration and fingerprint records from Peacemaker to Peacemaker's father, August Ransom "Auggie" Smith. This exasperates Murn for potentially ruining Peacemaker's relationship with the team. Murn, Economos, Harcourt, Adebayo and Peacemaker gather, pondering why Sturphausen attacked Peacemaker, and if there is a mole amongst them. Peacemaker reveals that Sturphausen only attacked him after she read the dossier on Peacemaker's assassination target. Murn states that the Butterflies are a national threat. Murn has Adebayo bribe Evan and Amber into identifying Auggie as the hostage-taker to the police, instead of Peacemaker. Song and Fitzgibbon arrest Auggie, holding him in Evergreen's jail. Several white inmates kneel before Auggie and hail him as the White Dragon.

Returning to his home, Peacemaker breaks down crying, lamenting on how he aggravates others, causing everyone to dislike him, while also regretting his killing of Rick Flag. The costumed and masked Vigilante interrupts Peacemaker, wanting to befriend Peacemaker, but keeps his own identity secret. Peacemaker expresses doubts in his goals of torturing and killing to achieve peace, considering himself a "maniac", while Vigilante assures him that they are killing "bad people", revealing Vigilante's pleasure in murdering lawbreakers. Vigilante cheers Peacemaker up by having them test weapons and explosives in the woods; they then have a threesome with Amber. Peacemaker touches the alien device, which transforms into a small spaceship.

== Production ==
=== Development ===
In July 2021, the episode's title was revealed as "Best Friends, For Never".

=== Writing ===
According to James Gunn, the reveal of Auggie as White Dragon was met with mixed reactions by HBO Max executives, deeming it "a delicate situation". Eventually, HBO Max allowed him to go as planned with the storyline. Gunn was interested in exploring the concept of white supremacy, explaining, "I think it's a real thing in our world and being able to present it in a fable is important to us".

The sequence where Adrian Chase helps Peacemaker in lifting his spirit by taking him to a shooting practice was partly inspired by Gunn's childhood. He explained, "We exploded a lot of things. We lit a lot of things on fire. We shot guns. We shot fireworks at each other. We used to start with the bottle rockets and then bring out the bigger bottle rockets. One of us would be on fire and screaming, and then everybody else would be laughing. And then someone would put out the fire and then start laughing, too. And then we'd have to go home to our moms and explain this stuff. So that was purely my superhero representation of what I did as a kid in the woods of Missouri".

=== Casting ===
In December 2020, Annie Chang and Lochlyn Munro joined the series to recur as Detectives Sophie Song and Larry Fitzgibbon, with the episode marking their debut in the series.

== Critical reception ==
"Best Friends, For Never" received positive reviews from critics. Samantha Nelson of IGN gave the three-episode premiere a "great" 8 out of 10 rating and wrote in his verdict, "Peacemaker isn't quite as sharply written as Amazon's The Boys, but James Gunn is aiming for the same sort of subversive superhero show, using excessive violence and biting humor to deconstruct the failings of the genre. The three-episode premiere offers a goofy takedown of vigilantism while hinting at bigger and darker plots to come."

Jarrod Jones of The A.V. Club gave the three-episode premiere an "A–" grade and wrote, "Peacemaker is a stacked deck of fearsome insanity and there's a lot to accept in these first three episodes. It's vulgar, violent, prone to non sequitur, and has more than one dance sequence in store for you. But don't you dare let its ceaseless barrage of profanity, nudity, and slaughter dupe you into thinking otherwise: James Gunn's Peacemaker comes packing, among other things, a beating heart."

Alan Sepinwall of Rolling Stone gave the three-episode premiere a 4 star rating out of 5 and wrote, "Between the blood and guts, the slapstick, the political satire, and the musical digressions, there is a lot going on here. Yet the series functions as a sincere character study of its flawed hero — and the unfortunate souls who have to work alongside him — just enough for the joke to never quite wear thin. Even in a wildly oversaturated market for tales of hypermuscular men and women punching their way to justice, Peacemaker stands out. You'll wanna taste it, even the parts that are in incredibly bad taste." Alec Bojalad of Den of Geek gave the three-episode premiere a 4 star rating out of 5 and wrote, "Ultimately, Peacemaker is another win for the suddenly surprisingly competitive DC Comics TV landscape."
