= Monkey Dory =

- Peacemaker episode
- Episode no.: Season 1 Episode 5
- Directed by: Rosemary Rodriguez
- Written by: James Gunn
- Cinematography by: Sam McCurdy
- Editing by: Gregg Featherman
- Original air date: January 27, 2022
- Running time: 42 minutes

Episode chronology
← Previous "The Choad Less Traveled"	Next → "Murn After Reading"
- Peacemaker season 1

"Monkey Dory" is the fifth episode of the American black comedy superhero drama television series Peacemaker, a spin-off from the 2021 film The Suicide Squad. The episode was written by series creator James Gunn and directed by Rosemary Rodriguez. It originally aired on HBO Max on January 27, 2022.

The series is set after the events of The Suicide Squad, and follows Chris Smith / Peacemaker. Smith returns to his home but is forced to work with A.R.G.U.S. agents on a classified operation only known as "Project Butterfly". Smith also has to deal with his personal demons, including feeling haunted by memories of people he killed for "peace", as well as reconnecting with his estranged father. In the episode, the police re-open Auggie's case as he claims he was framed by his own son. Meanwhile, the team prepares for an operation on a factory connected to the Butterflies.

The episode received generally positive reviews from critics, who praised the humor, action sequences and character development, although the pacing received some criticism.

== Plot ==
Clemson Murn briefs the rest of the team (Emilia Harcourt, John Economos, Leota Adebayo, Chris Smith / Peacemaker and Adrian Chase / Vigilante) on the Butterfly aliens. One year prior, after a billionaire and a singer died in a plane crash, Butterflies were found in their heads during autopsies; subsequently more Butterflies were found in politicians, celebrities and industry leaders. Butterflies enter humans through the body's orifices, take over the brain, and greatly enhance the host bodies' strength. Official operations against Butterflies were shut down by high-ranking government officials, thus Amanda Waller was running this team as a secret operation with no backup. With Butterflies only feeding on a particular amber liquid, Murn sends the team to raid the Glan Tai Bottling Company factory, where the team suspect the liquid is made. Peacemaker displays outward resentment towards Economos for framing Peacemaker's father Auggie for Peacemaker's crimes.

Murn stays back to deal with Auggie, arranging for his associate, Caspar Locke, to take over as the local police captain. In prison, Auggie asks Detectives Sophie Song and Larry Fitzgibbon to retake his fingerprints, which exonerate him, so Song and Fitzgibbon confront Evan and Amber Calcaterra, who had helped to frame Auggie. Evan admits the truth, identifying Peacemaker as the culprit. Captain Locke overrides Song, proclaiming Auggie guilty, keeping him in prison. Song and Fitzgibbon secretly ask Song's uncle, Judge William Judy, to issue a search warrant regarding Peacemaker.

The team finds that Glan Tai Bottling Company mass-processes the Butterflies' food, while Peacemaker's X-ray vision helmet shows the employees as Butterflies. The team shoots and bombs the Butterfly employees to kill them, but are attacked by the factory's guardian, a Butterfly-hosting gorilla, Charlie. Peacemaker, Vigilante, Harcourt and Adebayo save each other from Charlie, but are overmatched. When the team stops communicating with Economos, he leaves their truck to help and kills Charlie with a chainsaw, earning Peacemaker's respect. The team bonds together following their success, naming themselves as the "11th Street Kids".

Peacemaker invites Adebayo into his home to drink, asking her for advice on wooing Harcourt. Adebayo advises Peacemaker to stop aggravating others as a defense mechanism. Adebayo secretly plants a diary in Peacemaker's home to frame him, per orders from her mother, Waller. Returning to headquarters, Adebayo puts on Peacemaker's X-ray vision helmet, and sees that Murn is a Butterfly. Murn realizes this, chases Adebayo down, and bats her gun away.

== Production ==
=== Development ===
In July 2021, it was announced that Rosemary Rodriguez would direct an episode of the series.

=== Writing ===
During the beginning of the episode, while the team is preparing for their mission, Adrian Chase asks if the headquarters have cable television, as he wants to watch the series Fargo. Due to the inconsistency of the episode's air date, executive producer Peter Safran explained that inside the DC Extended Universe (DCEU), "It's Fargo's seventh season in the DCEU. Embrace the alternate reality".

=== Casting ===
In December 2020, Christopher Heyerdahl joined the series in the recurring role of Captain Locke.

== Critical reception ==
"Monkey Dory" received generally positive reviews from critics. Samantha Nelson of IGN gave the episode a "great" 8 out of 10 rating and wrote in his verdict, "The Butterfly conspiracy continues unfolding in Peacemaker Episode 5, which delivers a satisfying mix of plot, character development, and mayhem. Considering that it effectively involves three interlocking stories spread across genres, it's an impressive testament to James Gunn's writing and vision that everything is fitting together in such a satisfying and funny way."

Jarrod Jones of The A.V. Club gave the episode a "B+" grade and wrote, "Peacemaker's extermination of the alien horde is the first display of unrestrained havoc we've seen from the character since his pissing contest with Bloodsport in The Suicide Squad, but the real shock of 'Monkey Dory' is that the brutality of Chris' massacre is matched and then wildly exceeded by none other than Economos himself." Alec Bojalad of Den of Geek gave the episode a 3.5 star rating out of 5 and wrote, "Even in a relatively 'down' episode, Peacemaker is one hell of a TV series to experience. Apparently audiences agree as at least one analytic firm has pegged it as the streaming world's most-watched show. Hopefully those viewers appreciated learning that Superman has a poop fetish and Poison's preferred pronouns are 'long live rock' this week."
