= Peacemaker (TV series) =

2022 DC Studios television series

- Intertitle from the first season's opening dance number
- Genre: Action; Black comedy; Drama; Superhero
- Created by: James Gunn
- Based on: Characters from DC
- Showrunner: James Gunn
- Written by: James Gunn
- Starring: John Cena; Danielle Brooks; Freddie Stroma; Chukwudi Iwuji; Jennifer Holland; Steve Agee; Robert Patrick; Frank Grillo
- Music by: Clint Mansell; Kevin Kiner
- Opening theme: "Do Ya Wanna Taste It" by Wig Wam (S1); "Oh Lord" by Foxy Shazam (S2)
- Country of origin: United States
- Original language: English
- No. of seasons: 2
- No. of episodes: 16

Production
- Executive producers: Matt Miller (s. 1); Peter Safran; James Gunn; John Cena (s. 2)
- Producers: Lars Winther; John H. Starke; John Rickard; Galen Vaisman
- Production locations: Vancouver, British Columbia, Canada; Atlanta, Georgia
- Cinematography: Michael Bonvillain; Sam McCurdy; Michael Wale; Scott Peck
- Editors: Fred Raskin; Todd Busch; Greg D'Auria; Gregg Featherman; Zene Baker; Scott A. Jacobs; Philip Fowler
- Running time: 33–58 minutes
- Production companies: The Safran Company; Troll Court Entertainment; DC Films (s. 1); DC Studios (s. 2); Warner Bros. Television

Original release
- Network: HBO Max
- Release: January 13, 2022 – October 9, 2025

Related
- The Suicide Squad; DCU TV series

Peacemaker is an American superhero television series created by James Gunn for the streaming service HBO Max, based on the eponymous character from DC Comics. The first season is a spin-off of the film The Suicide Squad (2021) set in the DC Extended Universe (DCEU), further exploring jingoistic self-titled hero Chris Smith / Peacemaker. The second and final season is the first live-action series in the DC Universe (DCU), a "soft reboot" of the DCEU, retroactively incorporating most of The Suicide Squad and the first season into the DCU's continuity, and taking place after the events of the film Superman (2025). The series is produced by the Safran Company and Troll Court Entertainment in association with Warner Bros. Television and with Gunn as showrunner. The second was produced by DC Studios with Gunn returning as showrunner.

John Cena stars as Chris Smith / Peacemaker, reprising his role from The Suicide Squad, alongside Danielle Brooks, Freddie Stroma, Chukwudi Iwuji, Jennifer Holland, Steve Agee, and Robert Patrick also starring in the first season, with Frank Grillo joining the cast in the second season. Although the character was originally slated to be killed in The Suicide Squad, Gunn conceived Peacemaker after noting Cena's strength as a dramatic actor, and wrote the first season while finishing the film. HBO Max ordered it straight-to-series in September 2020. Filming took place in Vancouver, Canada, from January to July 2021, with Gunn directing five episodes. He chose to use hair metal songs for the series' soundtrack, including "Do Ya Wanna Taste It" by Wig Wam for the dance sequence accompanying the first season's opening titles. A second season was ordered in February 2022, with Gunn again writing all episodes. The season was integrated with the DCU after Gunn was named co-CEO of DC Studios. Filming took place at Trilith Studios in Atlanta, Georgia, from April to November 2024.

Peacemaker premiered on January 13, 2022, with its first three episodes. The other five episodes of the first season were released weekly until February 17. The second and final season premiered on August 21, 2025, and released weekly until October 9. Following the conclusion of the second season, Gunn announced there were no plans for a third season. The series has been nominated for several awards, including a Primetime Creative Arts Emmy Award. A spin-off series, Waller, is in development as part of the DCU.

== Premise ==
The first season follows Chris Smith / Peacemaker after he recovers from the injuries he suffered during the events of the DC Extended Universe (DCEU) film The Suicide Squad (2021). Peacemaker is forced to join the mysterious A.R.G.U.S. black ops squad "Project Butterfly", who are on a mission to identify and eliminate parasitic butterfly-like creatures who have taken over human bodies around the world. The second season is set in the DC Universe (DCU) after the events of the DCU film Superman (2025). It follows Peacemaker finding an alternate universe where he is a beloved hero alongside his brother and father.

== Cast and characters ==
=== Main ===
- John Cena as Chris Smith / Peacemaker:
  A jingoistic vigilante who believes in achieving peace at any cost. Showrunner James Gunn called him a "piece of shit" and said he was a "superhero/supervillain/[the] world's biggest douchebag". In the second season, Gunn said the character was no longer a "total asshole" and had become less obnoxious and aggressive. Cena also plays an alternate heroic version of the character from Earth-2 in season 2, while Quinn Bennet portrays a younger Chris in season 1. Myles Benson portrays a younger Chris in season 2.
- Danielle Brooks as Leota Adebayo: The daughter of A.R.G.U.S. director Amanda Waller.
- Freddie Stroma as Adrian Chase / Vigilante: A self-proclaimed crimefighter who looks up to Peacemaker like an older brother. Stroma also portrays Earth-2 Vigilante in season 2.
- Chukwudi Iwuji as Clemson Murn / Ik Nobe Lok (season 1): A mercenary and the leader of Project Butterfly who reports to Waller.
- Jennifer Holland as Emilia Harcourt: An A.R.G.U.S. agent who has a complicated relationship with Chris. Holland also portrays Earth-2 Harcourt in season 2.
- Steve Agee as John Economos: An A.R.G.U.S. agent who provides tactical support.
- Robert Patrick as:
  - Auggie Smith / White Dragon (season 1, guest season 2): Peacemaker's abusive white supremacist supervillain father who supplies him with technology to aid his mission.
  - Auggie Smith / Blue Dragon (season 2): An alternate version of Peacemaker's father from Earth-2, who is a caring father and well-known superhero alongside Peacemaker and his brother Keith, who died in the main universe.
- Frank Grillo as Rick Flag Sr. (season 2): The new director of A.R.G.U.S. and the father of deceased Suicide Squad leader Rick Flag Jr. who Peacemaker killed.

=== Recurring ===
- Dee Bradley Baker as the voice of Eagly: Peacemaker's pet eagle who is also his sidekick and best friend.
- Elizabeth Ludlow as Keeya Adebayo: Leota's wife who is worrisome of Leota taking the job.
- Nhut Le as Hadley "Rip" Jagger / Judomaster: A martial-arts based bodyguard who protects the Butterflies and Royland Goff, and later becomes an A.R.G.U.S. agent. He has a personal vendetta against Peacemaker and Economos.
- Annie Chang as Sophie Song (season 1): An Evergreen police detective assigned to investigate the murder of Annie Sturphausen.
- Lochlyn Munro as Larry Fitzgibbon (season 1, guest season 2): An Evergreen police detective assigned to investigate the murder of Annie Sturphausen. Munro also plays Earth-2 Larry Fitzgibbon in season 2.
- Christopher Heyerdahl as Caspar Locke (season 1): An informant of Murn who poses as a police captain to keep Peacemaker out of prison.
- David Denman as Keith Smith / Captain Triumph (season 2): An alternative version of Chris's older brother in Earth-2 who died in the main universe as a child but is still alive in Earth-2. In Earth-2, he is a member of the Top Trio with his brother and father as Captain Triumph.
- Sol Rodríguez as Sasha Bordeaux (season 2): A cyborg A.R.G.U.S. agent assigned to track Peacemaker by Rick Flag Sr.
- Tim Meadows as Langston Fleury (season 2): An A.R.G.U.S. agent assigned to survey Peacemaker.
- Michael Rooker as Red St. Wild (season 2): An eagle hunter hired to kill Eagly by A.R.G.U.S. Rooker previously played Brian Durlin / Savant in The Suicide Squad (2021).
- Dorian Kingi as Kyphotic Alien (season 2): An alien who, like Peacemaker, owns a dimensional rift which is right next to Peacemaker's.
- Reinaldo Faberlle as Vega (season 2): An A.R.G.U.S. agent who raids Peacemaker's home.
- Brandon Stanley as Kline (season 2): An A.R.G.U.S. agent who raids Peacemaker's home and is nicknamed "Kewpie Doll" by Fleury.

=== Notable guests ===
- Antonio Cupo as Royland Goff (season 1): A U.S. Senator who is secretly a Butterfly.
- Rizwan Manji as Jamil (season 1): A janitor Peacemaker meets in the hospital who informs him that no one is looking for him.
- Lenny Jacobson as Evan Calaterra (season 1): A witness to Annie Sturphausen's death and Amber Calaterra's husband who was taken hostage by Peacemaker.
- Viola Davis as Amanda Waller (season 1): Leota Adebayo's mother who assigns her to Project Butterfly after Leota's business fails.
- Jason Momoa as Arthur Curry / Aquaman (season 1): A superhero and member of the Justice League with sonar and aquatic abilities who Peacemaker claims has intercourse with fish.
- Ezra Miller as Barry Allen / The Flash (season 1): A superhero and member of the Justice League with super speed.
- Nathan Fillion as Guy Gardner / Green Lantern (season 2): An abrasive member of the Green Lantern Corps and the Justice Gang, replacing Aquaman due to the DCU reboot.
- Isabela Merced as Kendra Saunders / Hawkgirl (season 2): A member of the Justice Gang with wings and various melee weapons, who is reincarnated from an alien, replacing the Flash due to the DCU reboot.
- Sean Gunn as Maxwell Lord (season 2): A millionaire business magnate who provides funding to the Justice Gang.
- Joel Kinnaman as Rick Flag Jr. (season 2): The former leader of the Suicide Squad, whom Peacemaker killed in Corto Maltese, and the former lover of Emilia Harcourt.
- Nicholas Hoult as Lex Luthor (season 2), a billionaire inventor turned supervillain.
- Stephen Blackehart as Sydney Happersen (season 2), a former LuthorCorp employee.

== Episodes ==
Seasons of Peacemaker
Season	Episodes	Originally released	
Season	Episodes	First released	Last released
1	8	January 13, 2022	February 17, 2022
2	8	August 21, 2025	October 9, 2025

=== Season 1 (2022) ===
No. overall	No. in season	Title	Directed by	Written by	Original release date
1	1	"A Whole New Whirled"	James Gunn	James Gunn	January 13, 2022
2	2	"Best Friends, For Never"	James Gunn	James Gunn	January 13, 2022
3	3	"Better Goff Dead"	James Gunn	James Gunn	January 13, 2022
4	4	"The Choad Less Traveled"	Jody Hill	James Gunn	January 20, 2022
5	5	"Monkey Dory"	Rosemary Rodriguez	James Gunn	January 27, 2022
6	6	"Murn After Reading"	James Gunn	James Gunn	February 3, 2022
7	7	"Stop Dragon My Heart Around"	Brad Anderson	James Gunn	February 10, 2022
8	8	"It's Cow or Never"	James Gunn	James Gunn	February 17, 2022

=== Season 2 (2025) ===
No. overall	No. in season	Title	Directed by	Written by	Original release date
9	1	"The Ties That Grind"	James Gunn	James Gunn	August 21, 2025
10	2	"A Man Is Only as Good as His Bird"	Greg Mottola	James Gunn	August 28, 2025
11	3	"Another Rick Up My Sleeve"	Greg Mottola	James Gunn	September 4, 2025
12	4	"Need I Say Door"	Peter Sollett	James Gunn	September 11, 2025
13	5	"Back to the Suture"	Alethea Jones	James Gunn	September 18, 2025
14	6	"Ignorance Is Chris"	James Gunn	James Gunn	September 25, 2025
15	7	"Like a Keith in the Night"	Alethea Jones	James Gunn	October 2, 2025
16	8	"Full Nelson"	James Gunn	James Gunn	October 9, 2025

== Production ==
=== Development ===
While completing work on the DC Extended Universe (DCEU) film The Suicide Squad (2021) in August 2020, writer and director James Gunn began writing a spin-off television series centered on the character Peacemaker portrayed by John Cena. DC Films president Walter Hamada approached the filmmakers of the studio's film slate about creating interconnected spin-off television series for the streaming service HBO Max, and the service ordered Peacemaker straight-to-series in September 2020. Gunn was writing all eight episodes of the first season and directing five. He and Peter Safran were set as executive producers, with Cena as co-executive producer. The season was produced by Gunn's Troll Court Entertainment and the Safran Company in conjunction with Warner Bros. Television. Matt Miller joined as an additional executive producer in December 2020.

HBO Max announced a second season of Peacemaker in February 2022, with Gunn set to write and direct all episodes. That April, Discovery, Inc. and Warner Bros.'s parent company WarnerMedia merged to become Warner Bros. Discovery, led by president and CEO David Zaslav. The new company was expected to restructure DC Entertainment and Zaslav began searching for an equivalent to Marvel Studios president Kevin Feige to lead the new subsidiary. Gunn and Safran were announced as the co-chairs and co-CEOs of the newly formed DC Studios at the end of October 2022. A week after starting their new roles, the pair had begun working with a group of writers to develop an eight-to-ten-year plan for a new DC Universe (DCU) that would be a "soft reboot" of the DCEU. Gunn and Safran said some cast members would return from The Suicide Squad and Peacemaker in the DCU, and a "rough memory" of those events would remain in the new universe. Because Gunn was busy with his new responsibilities, the second season of Peacemaker was put on hold by January 2023.

Later in 2023, Gunn said the second season was his next project after the DCU film Superman (2025), and said it would be part of the DCU's Chapter One: Gods and Monsters slate of content. He stated that the first season was not canon to the DCU, but later clarified that most of the first season's events are canon to the DCU except for specific moments such as the appearance of the DCEU's Justice League. In March 2024, Gunn said filming for the second season would take place simultaneously with Superman later that year, in the interest of getting the season ready as soon as possible, so he was no longer able to direct all of the episodes.

=== Casting ===
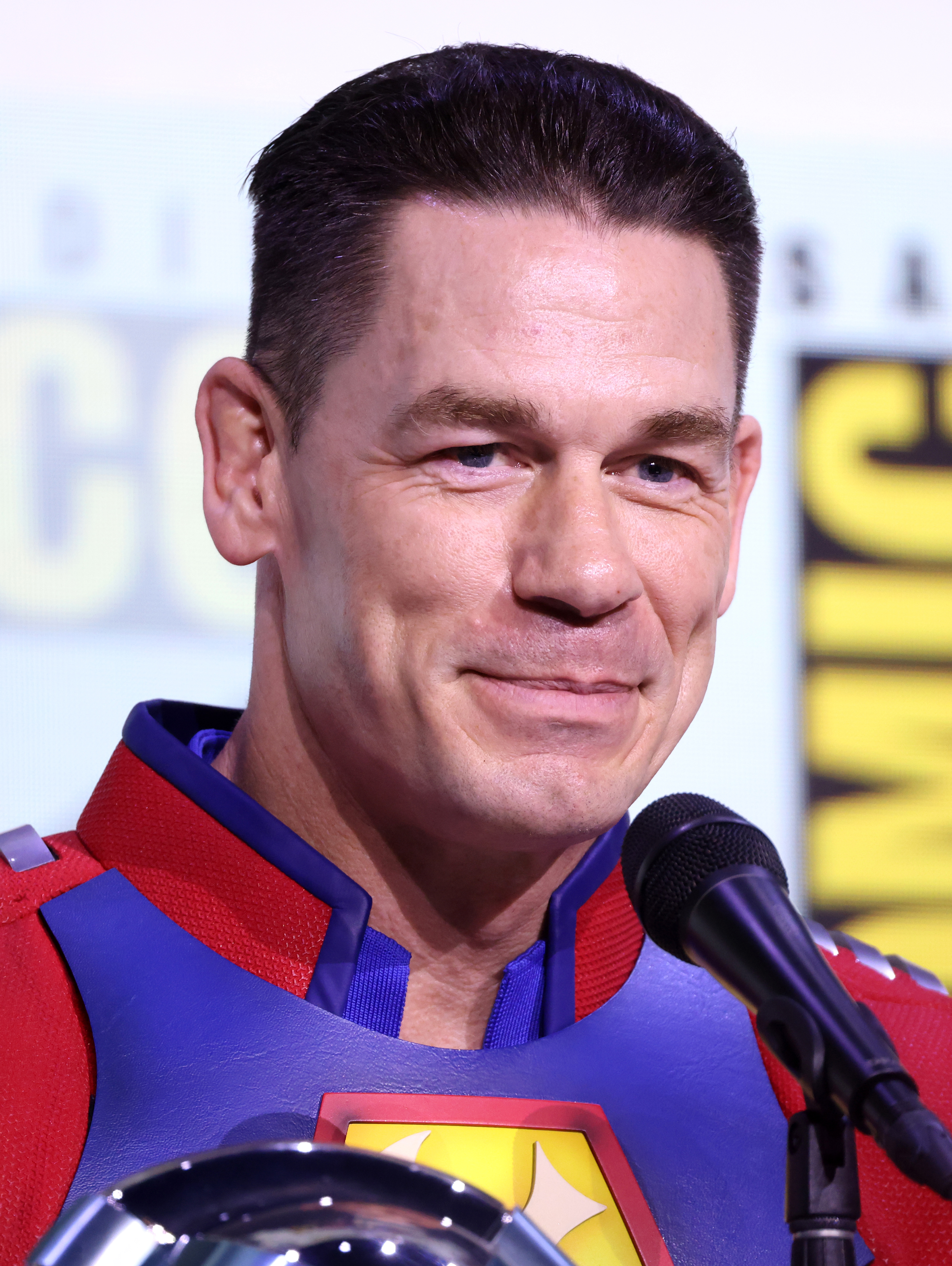
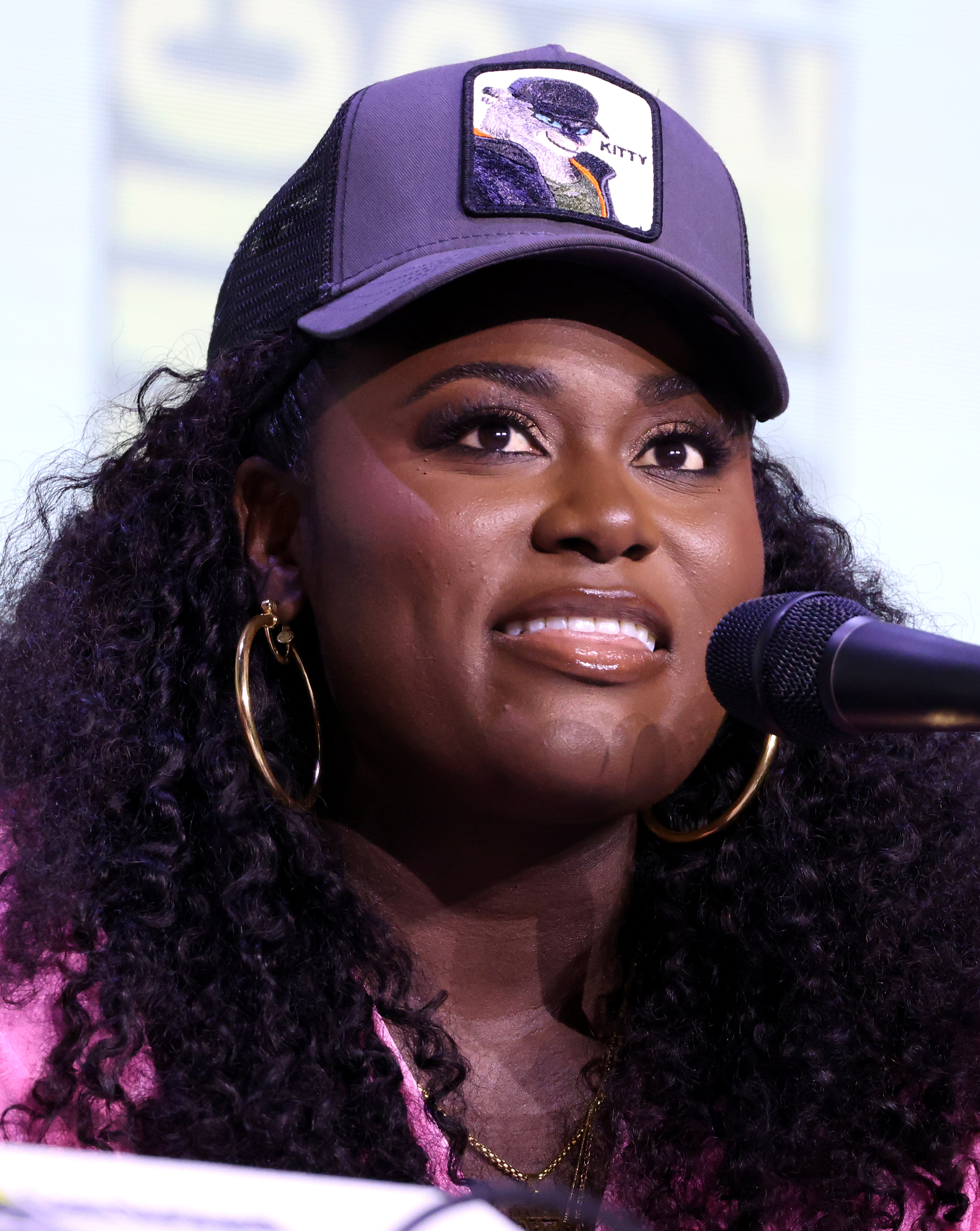
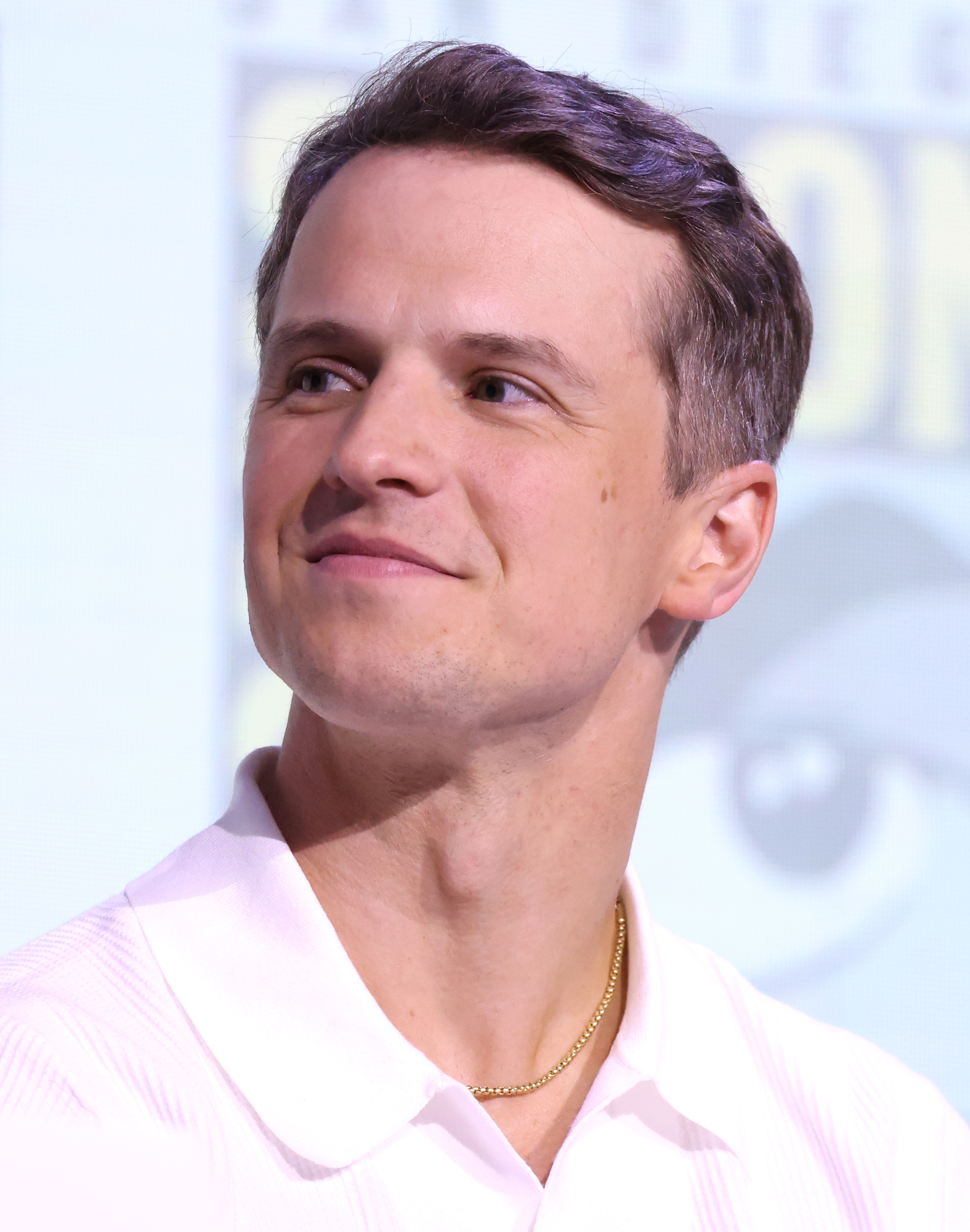
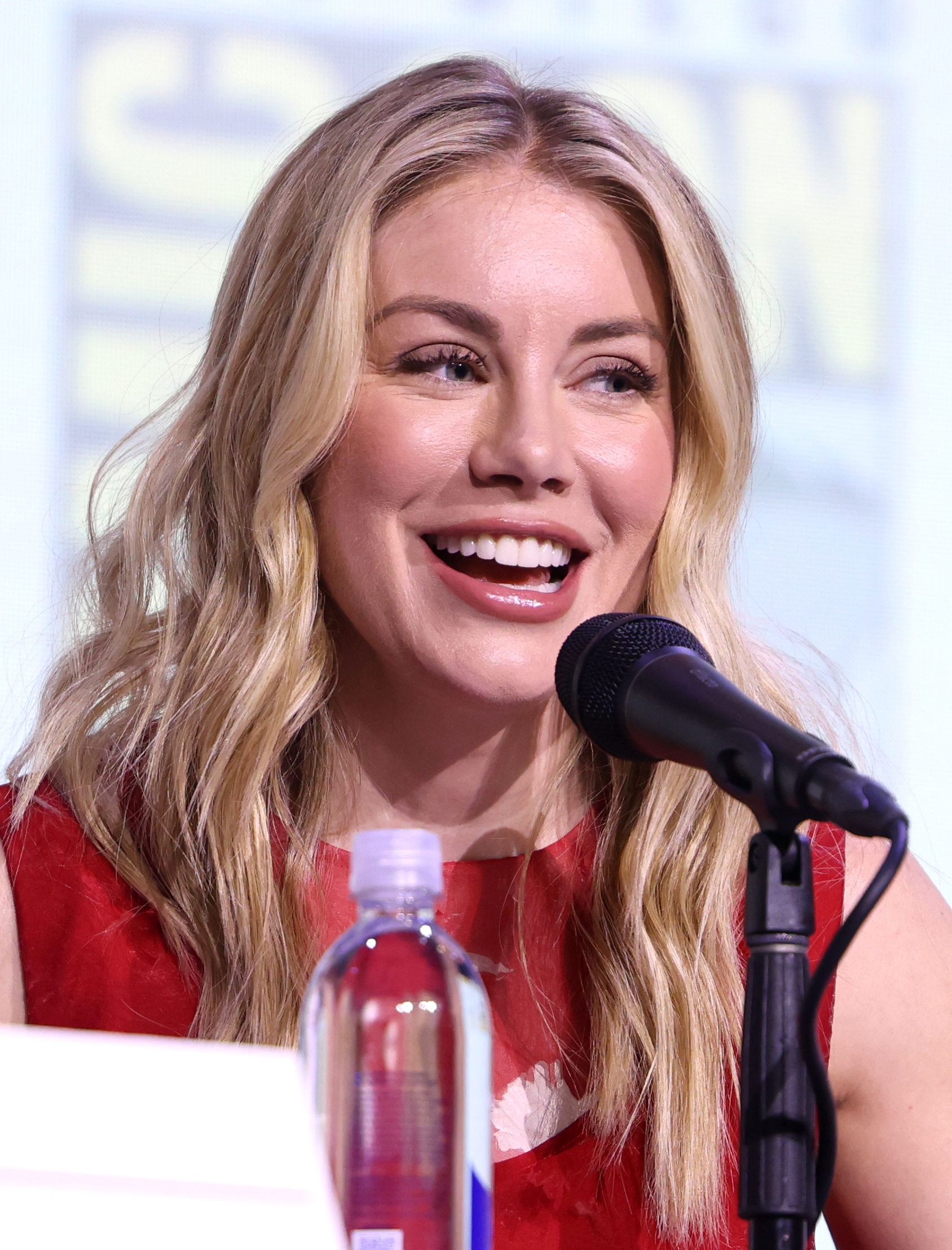
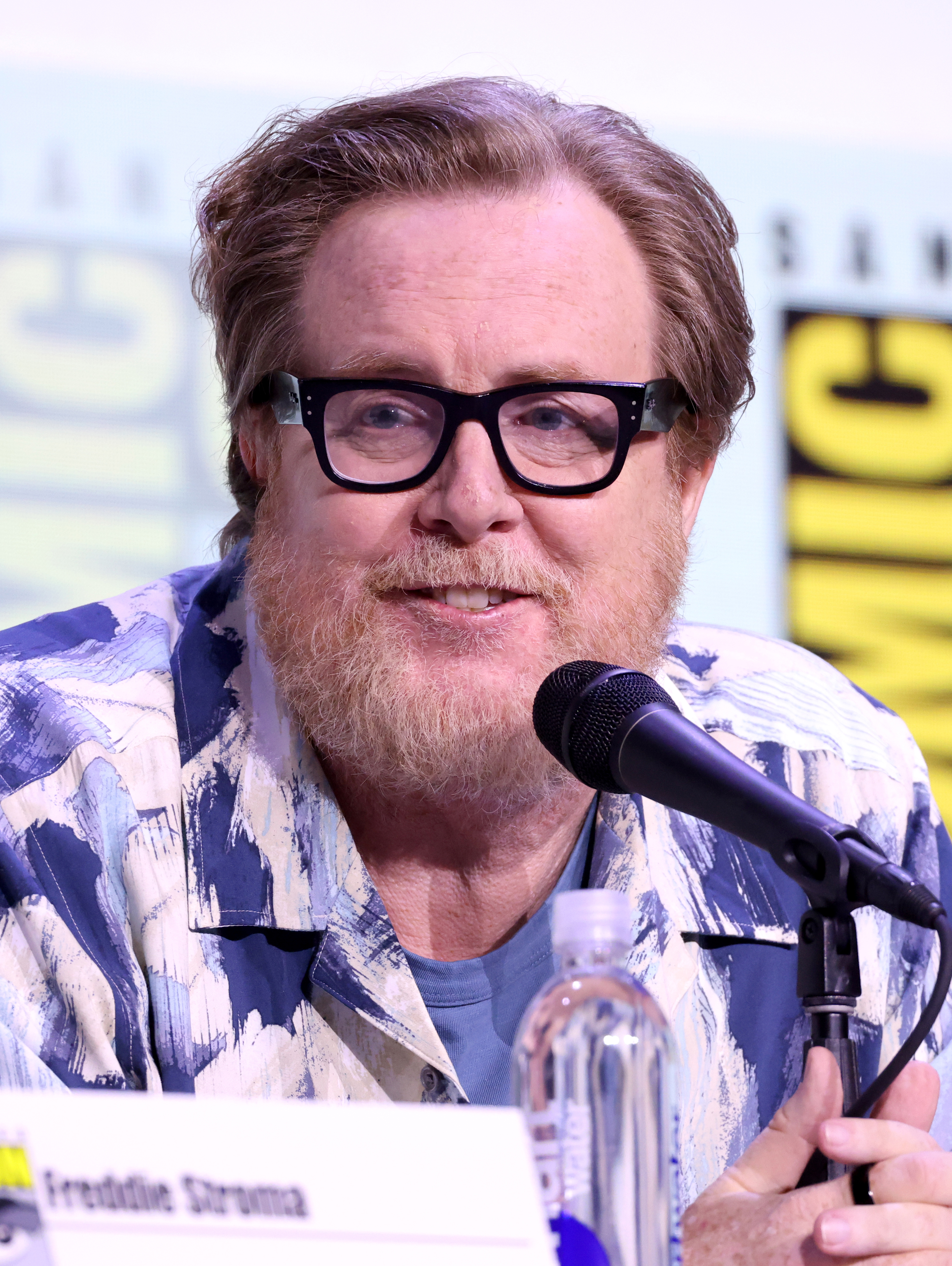
The 11th Street Kids (Team Peacemaker) are played by John Cena (Peacemaker), Danielle Brooks (Adebayo), Freddie Stroma (Vigilante), Jennifer Holland (Harcourt), and Steve Agee (Economos)

With the series order in September 2020, John Cena was confirmed to be reprising his role as Peacemaker from The Suicide Squad. The next month, Gunn's close friend Steve Agee joined the series as John Economos, also returning from the film. In November, Gunn's then-girlfriend Jennifer Holland joined as her The Suicide Squad character Emilia Harcourt, alongside Danielle Brooks as Leota Adebayo, Robert Patrick as Auggie Smith, and Chris Conrad as Adrian Chase / Vigilante. Holland was surprised that Gunn brought her character back for the series, believing that her part in The Suicide Squad would be a short one-off role. Chukwudi Iwuji joined the cast as Clemson Murn in December. In late May 2021, Freddie Stroma was cast to replace Conrad as Adrian Chase / Vigilante, after Conrad left the series due to creative differences.

Cena confirmed that he would be returning for the second season when it was ordered in February 2022. In July 2023, Gunn said Stroma would reprise his role as Vigilante in the DCU. Also reprising their roles from the first season are Brooks, Holland, and Agee. In May 2024, Frank Grillo joined the cast for the second season as Rick Flag Sr., reprising his role from the DCU animated series Creature Commandos (2024–present). Sol Rodríguez, David Denman, and Tim Meadows were cast the following month, with Rodríguez portraying Sasha Bordeaux and Meadows cast as Langston Fleury. Michael Rooker was revealed in May 2025 to be appearing as an original character named Red St. Wild. Rooker previously had small roles in The Suicide Squad and Creature Commandos.

=== Filming ===
Filming for the first season began on January 15, 2021, in Vancouver, under the working title The Scriptures, with Michael Bonvillain as cinematographer. Gunn directed five of the season's episodes, with Jody Hill, Rosemary Rodriguez, and Brad Anderson each directing one. Production lasted 131 days total, and wrapped on July 11.

Filming for the second season began in April 2024, taking place simultaneously with production on Superman at Trilith Studios in Atlanta, Georgia, and concluded in November 2024. Sam McCurdy was the cinematographer. Gunn directed three of the season's episodes, with Greg Mottola, Peter Sollett, and Alethea Jones also directing.

=== Music ===
Gunn revealed in June 2021 that Clint Mansell and Kevin Kiner were composing the score for the series, after The Suicide Squad composer John Murphy was busy writing the score for Gunn's Guardians of the Galaxy Vol. 3 (2023). A soundtrack album featuring Mansell and Kiner's score was released on February 18, 2022. The first season also features hair metal songs that Gunn selected and wrote into the scripts.

== Release ==
Home media releases for Peacemaker
Season	Home media release dates		
Season	Region 1	Region 2	Region 4
1	November 22, 2022	September 5, 2022	October 27, 2022

Peacemaker premiered on HBO Max on January 13, 2022, with its first three episodes. The series was released in the United Kingdom on March 22, on Sky Max and Now. The second season premiered on HBO Max on August 21, 2025.

== Reception ==
=== Viewership ===
Deadline Hollywood reported that each episode of Peacemaker received higher viewership than the last, and HBO Max stated that the season finale's viewership was 44 percent higher than the series premiere's. According to the service, the finale broke the record for highest single day viewership of an HBO Max original episode. In the UK, where Peacemaker was not released until after it had finished airing in the US, the series was the third-most pirated for the first quarter of 2022 after HBO's Euphoria and Disney+'s The Book of Boba Fett.

According to Samba TV, 22% more U.S. households watched the premiere of the second season than the finale of the first season.

=== Critical response ===
Critical response of Peacemaker
Season	Rotten Tomatoes	Metacritic
1	93% (91 reviews)	70 (26 reviews)
2	94% (149 reviews)	78 (18 reviews)

On the review aggregator website Rotten Tomatoes, 93% of 91 critics' reviews for the first season are positive. The website's consensus reads: "John Cena's still in solid form as Peacemaker, leading a bloody good time that gives writer-director James Gunn full permission to let his freak flag fly." Metacritic, which uses a weighted average, assigned the season a score of 70 out of 100, based on 26 critics, indicating "generally favorable" reviews. The title sequence was praised, with critics also highlighting Gunn's sense of fun and "raunchy humor", and Cena's performance. Some found other characters and story elements to be underdeveloped.

On Rotten Tomatoes, 94% of 149 critics' reviews for the second season are positive. The website's consensus reads: "Peacemaker's second season goes multidimensional while still maintaining a singular focus on emotional stakes, seamlessly transporting this outrageous antihero into a fresh cinematic universe." Metacritic assigned the season a score of 78 out of 100, based on 18 critics, indicating "generally favorable" reviews. Critics found the season to be better than the first, calling it "just as dark, brutal, and silly" but more grounded, character focused, and heartwarming, with praise for Cena's performance and the wider cast.

=== Accolades ===
The first season was nominated for a Primetime Creative Arts Emmy Award, an Annie Award, three Critics' Choice Super Awards, two MTV Movie & TV Awards, and two Saturn Awards. The second season was nominated for a Critics' Choice Award, an Astra Creative Arts Award, three Saturn Awards, and a Primetime Emmy.

== Podcasts ==
HBO Max and DC worked with production company Rooster Teeth to produce an official, aftershow-style video podcast titled Podly. Hosted by Fiona Nova and Ify Nwadiwe, each episode includes a recap of one of the first season's episodes as well as interviews with cast and crew. The video podcast was made available to stream on HBO Max and YouTube, with an audio-only version available via audio platforms.

Gunn announced Peacemaker: The Official Podcast with James Gunn in July 2025, a new companion podcast for the series featuring himself and the cast. It begins with a rewatch of the first season, including discussion of what parts of the first season are DCU canon, followed by a new podcast episode after each of the second season's episodes. The podcast is being made available on HBO Max, YouTube, and audio platforms.

== Spin-offs ==
In January 2021, James Gunn said he had ideas for more The Suicide Squad television spin-offs beyond Peacemaker, and confirmed that he was working on another one a year later. In May 2022, a series featuring Amanda Waller was revealed, with Viola Davis in negotiations to reprise her DCEU role. Christal Henry was writing the series, which was expected to build off Waller's guest appearances in Peacemaker. The next month, Gunn said the series that he had revealed earlier was separate from a potential Amanda Waller project though there would be "some blending" of characters from Peacemaker in both. On January 31, Gunn and Safran unveiled the first projects from their DCU slate, which begins with Chapter One: Gods and Monsters. The second project in the slate was Waller, with Davis confirmed to be reprising her role. Henry was revealed to be working on the overall story for the DCU with Gunn and some other writers, and was set as co-showrunner of Waller alongside Jeremy Carver. The spin-off is expected to be made after the second season of Peacemaker.

In 2024, a tie-in non-canonical comic, Peacemaker Presents: The Vigilante/Eagly Double Feature! was announced. The comic centered around Peacemaker characters Vigilante and Eagly in two stories. Gunn was a story consultant on the comic, which was written by Rex Ogle and Tim Seeley with art by Matteo Lolli and Mitch Gerads. The comic released monthly from March through August 2025.
