= Silver Skies (film) =

- Film poster
- Directed by: Rosemary Rodriguez
- Written by: Rosemary Rodriguez
- Produced by: Rosemary Rodriguez; Enrico Natale
- Starring: George Hamilton; Jack McGee; Barbara Bain; Jack Betts; Valerie Perrine; Alex Rocco; Mariette Hartley
- Cinematography: Nancy Schreiber
- Edited by: Francis Zuccarello
- Music by: Jim Coleman
- Production company: Roar Productions
- Release date: October 3, 2015 (Woodstock)
- Running time: 96 minutes
- Country: United States
- Language: English

Silver Skies is a 2015 American comedy-drama film written and directed by Rosemary Rodriguez and starring George Hamilton, Jack McGee, Barbara Bain, Jack Betts, Valerie Perrine in her final film role before retirement from acting in 2016 due to Parkinson’s disease and her death in 2026, Alex Rocco and Mariette Hartley.

== Cast ==
- George Hamilton
- Valerie Perrine
- Barbara Bain
- Mariette Hartley
- Jack McGee
- Alex Rocco
- Jack Betts
- Howard Hesseman

== Release ==
The film premiered at the Woodstock Film Festival on October 3, 2015.
