= The Choad Less Traveled =

- Peacemaker episode
- Episode no.: Season 1 Episode 4
- Directed by: Jody Hill
- Written by: James Gunn
- Cinematography by: Michael Bonvillain
- Editing by: Greg D'Auria
- Original air date: January 20, 2022
- Running time: 46 minutes

Episode chronology
← Previous "Better Goff Dead"	Next → "Monkey Dory"
- Peacemaker season 1

"The Choad Less Traveled" is the fourth episode of the American black comedy superhero drama television series Peacemaker, a spin-off from the 2021 film The Suicide Squad. The episode was written by series creator James Gunn and directed by Jody Hill. It originally aired on HBO Max on January 20, 2022.

The series is set after the events of The Suicide Squad, and follows Chris Smith / Peacemaker. Smith returns to his home but is forced to work with A.R.G.U.S. agents on a classified operation only known as "Project Butterfly". Smith also has to deal with his personal demons, including feeling haunted by memories of people he killed for "peace", as well as reconnecting with his estranged father. In the episode, Smith discovers that the team framed his father for his actions, creating tensions among the team. Meanwhile, Chase decides to infiltrate the prison to kill Auggie, thinking Smith will be better off without him.

The episode received positive reviews from critics, who praised the writing, performances, character development and twist ending.

== Plot ==
After their mission, Chris Smith / Peacemaker tells his teammates Clemson Murn, Emilia Harcourt, John Economos and Leota Adebayo that he killed the Butterfly alien that emerged from Senator Royland Goff's head. With Goff's bodyguard Judomaster captured, Harcourt and Adebayo stop Peacemaker and Vigilante from executing him.

The team reorganizes, with Judomaster restrained in their headquarters in an abandoned store. Adebayo reveals to Harcourt that she never shot at anyone before; Harcourt advises her to make hard choices when necessary. Peacemaker and Vigilante visit the house of Peacemaker's father, Auggie, where they recover more helmets for Peacemaker. Auggie's neighbor reveals Auggie's jailing, infuriating Peacemaker, who confronts Murn over the framing of Auggie. Peacemaker vows to visit Auggie against Murn's wishes. When Vigilante questions why, Peacemaker says he loves Auggie. During the journey, Vigilante sarcastically thanks Peacemaker for allowing Goff to torture him; Peacemaker later apologizes and the duo make up.

Murn assigns Adebayo to dissuade Peacemaker from meeting Auggie, but her effort fails. Peacemaker tells Auggie how his team framed Auggie, and his team's purpose of eliminating aliens. Auggie tells Peacemaker he never loved him, insists on tell everything to the police to exonerate himself and stop Peacemaker from working with the "deep state". As Peacemaker and Adebayo return to headquarters, Economos tells them Judomaster escaped his restraints. Judomaster overcomes Economos and fights Peacemaker. When Judomaster starts to discuss the Butterflies, Adebayo shoots him. Judomaster is restrained again, unconscious.

Meanwhile, Vigilante, who was manipulated by Adebayo into deciding to kill Auggie to help Peacemaker, breaks a window to be arrested. In prison, Vigilante tries to provoke Auggie into attacking him, but Auggie refuses. After Vigilante calls Auggie a "bad dad", Auggie believes Peacemaker wants him dead. Murn reacts badly to Adebayo's manipulation as the team may lose both Peacemaker and Vigilante. Murn has Economos arrange for Vigilante's release from prison, exposing Vigilante's identity, Adrian Chase; Harcourt fetches him, and Vigilante admits making a mistake.

Peacemaker returns home, taking out the still-alive Goff Butterfly in a jar, and amber liquid for it. Peacemaker is haunted by past memories: being trained by Auggie to kill from a young age, his killing of Rick Flag, (Note: As depicted in The Suicide Squad (2021).) and the death of his young brother Keith. Adebayo finds evidence about the Butterflies regarding Glan Tai Bottling Company; she calls Murn, who agrees to meet her. Alone, Murn consumes liquid with a proboscis-like tongue, revealing himself to be a Butterfly.

== Production ==
=== Development ===
In July 2021, it was announced that Jody Hill would direct an episode of the series.

=== Writing ===
The episode revealed the "White Dragon" suit, worn by Auggie to commit crimes in the past. Executive producer Peter Safran praised James Gunn's version of the suit, also adding, "Everything we did is the same as the way we would do it if we were making the film version of White Dragon, or the film version of Vigilante".

While Gunn said that HBO Max was supportive of his vision of the series, executives took a problem with the scene where Smith verbally insults Batman, particularly calling him "a pussy". Gunn defended the decision, stating that the character is known for his provocative nature and made far worse insults to other superhero characters. Gunn also agreed with Smith's point of view of Batman, explaining "[like] everybody else he's really just believing stuff that he read on the Internet. Everything that he believes is kind of nonsense, and Batman is the only one he has a point of view on that makes any sense whatsoever".

== Critical reception ==
"The Choad Less Traveled" received positive reviews from critics. Samantha Nelson of IGN gave the episode a "good" 7 out of 10 rating and wrote in his verdict, "Peacemaker's big twist isn't really that surprising and the show's attempts to make Vigilante and Peacemaker more sympathetic fall a bit short. But meta rants about superheroes, entertaining fights, and the general dysfunction of the team helps keep the show fun even if the plot is unfolding slowly."

Jarrod Jones of The A.V. Club gave the episode an "A–" grade and wrote, "'The Choad Less Traveled' is a dramatic peak for Peacemaker, especially in its final moments where Chris gets wasted with Eagly and the butterfly he plucked from Senator Goff's sci-fi basement last week." Alec Bojalad of Den of Geek gave the episode a 4 star rating out of 5 and wrote, "Peacemaker is somehow halfway through its eight-episode run already. While it has its flaws (Judomaster was perhaps one obscure DC character too many), this remains a truly worthwhile TV endeavor. Now let's see what's up with Murn: secret butterfly."

Mashable SEA ranked the episode the 17th best episode of 2022.
