= Stop Dragon My Heart Around =

- Peacemaker episode
- Episode no.: Season 1 Episode 7
- Directed by: Brad Anderson
- Written by: James Gunn
- Cinematography by: Michael Wale
- Editing by: Gregg Featherman
- Original air date: February 10, 2022
- Running time: 39 minutes

Episode chronology
← Previous "Murn After Reading"	Next → "It's Cow or Never"
- Peacemaker season 1

"Stop Dragon My Heart Around" is the seventh episode of the American black comedy superhero drama television series Peacemaker, a spin-off from the 2021 film The Suicide Squad. The episode was written by series creator James Gunn and directed by Brad Anderson. It originally aired on HBO Max on February 10, 2022.

The series is set after the events of The Suicide Squad, and follows Chris Smith / Peacemaker. Smith returns to his home but is forced to work with A.R.G.U.S. agents on a classified operation only known as "Project Butterfly". Smith also has to deal with his personal demons, including feeling haunted by memories of people he killed for "peace", as well as reconnecting with his estranged father. In the episode, the team is separated and subsequently chased by many personal enemies, which ends with some deaths.

The episode received acclaim from critics, who praised the writing, directing, performances, emotional tone and set-up for the finale.

== Plot ==
Chris Smith / Peacemaker is haunted by his childhood: his father Auggie made him and his brother Keith fight while other people watched and Auggie collected bets. After Auggie mocks him, Chris accidentally kills Keith with a punch that causes a seizure; Auggie blames Chris.

Peacemaker realizes that Locke is a Butterfly, and suspects that Leota Adebayo planted the fake diary to frame him. With the nation's police looking for him, Peacemaker hurriedly sets out with Adrian Chase / Vigilante, Eagly and John Economos to finish the Butterfly mission, ignoring Judomaster's escape from their custody.

Auggie, in his White Dragon suit, and his Aryan Empire followers track down Peacemaker's helmets, intending to kill Peacemaker. Auggie rams Economos' truck, and Peacemaker's team flees, but is caught. Auggie strikes Eagly, wounding it, then overpowers Peacemaker, but Vigilante stabs Auggie, disabling the White Dragon suit. Economos guns down the Aryan Empire to save Vigilante. Peacemaker beats Auggie, saying Auggie killed Keith. Auggie taunts Peacemaker to shoot, saying that Peacemaker will never be free of him regardless. Peacemaker shoots Auggie, killing him before breaking down.

Meanwhile, Emilia Harcourt confronts Adebayo, who admits planting the diary, vows to quit the team, and mentions that Amanda Waller is her mother. Clemson Murn tells Harcourt and Adebayo to leave, predicting that the Butterflies are coming as Butterfly-Locke knows Murn's location. While Harcourt and Adebayo hide, the Butterflies assault Murn's flat in their police officer bodies. Murn kills one, but is overwhelmed. Butterfly-Song shoots Murn's body, then crushes Murn's emerging Butterfly. After the Butterflies leave, Harcourt and Adebayo comfort Murn's Butterfly as it dies. Judomaster arrives, attacking them. He beats Harcourt, but Adebayo tasers him to incapacitate him.

The team reunites at a veterinary clinic, where Eagly is treated; the team persuades Vigilante to spare the clinic staff. Adebayo sees Peacemaker praying for Eagly, who revives and hugs him; Adebayo decides not to leave the team. The team appoints Harcourt as leader, replacing Murn. She states their mission: to defeat the Butterflies, they must kill the "Cow" located at Coverdale Ranch before the Butterflies can teleport it away. The Cow is the Butterflies' only food source; the Butterflies are expected to starve within weeks without food.

During the drive to Coverdale Ranch, Adebayo apologizes to Peacemaker, who dismisses her, saying that after the mission, he never wants to see her again. At Coverdale Ranch, the Cow is revealed to be a massive wormlike alien.

== Production ==
=== Development ===
In July 2021, it was announced that Brad Anderson would direct an episode of the series.

=== Writing ===
The episode featured the death of Clemson Murn. As Murn's death scene was shot out of order in the episode, Chukwudi Iwuji didn't approach the scene as his last scene, explaining "When we were doing it, it sort of choked out of me, which is always fun as an actor. You always want to be surprised by yourself and by what happens".

Jennifer Holland commented on the role that Harcourt would play for the episode, "I don't know that Emilia feels yet like she's a team leader, but she's definitely in a place now where she's been stepping up and becoming a more integral part of the team. She's also been accepting the fact that she's not a lone wolf, that she has a team and that’s better than working alone, because I think that for the longest time she just thought, 'Oh my God, these people are slowing me down'. But throughout the course of the series so far, she has really embraced being a part of a team — and she likes it".

== Reception ==
=== Critical reviews ===
"Stop Dragon My Heart Around" received acclaim from critics. Samantha Nelson of IGN gave the episode a "great" 8 out of 10 rating and wrote in his verdict, "Peacemaker finally confronts his father in a dramatic, prolonged battle that mixes zany comedy and big emotional stakes. Episode 7 shows how the characters have grown individually and as a team, developing into a group that just might be capable of saving the world."

Jarrod Jones of The A.V. Club gave the episode an "A" grade and wrote, "'Stop Dragon My Heart' is an all-business episode that racks up a dramatic body count, the bleakest installment of Peacemaker yet, but it is not without a touch of sweetness. There's the moment where we find Peacemaker praying over Eagly, who lunged at the White Dragon and paid a price for it, the only one besides Keith who ever loved Chris for real." Alec Bojalad of Den of Geek gave the episode a 4 star rating out of 5 and wrote, "'Stop Dragon My Heart Around' is a little strange as far as penultimate episodes go. Part of it is spent wrapping up Chris Smith's struggles with his father in spectacular fashion while the other part deals with setting up the climactic battle against the Butterflies in the finale to come. As such, the episode is a bit tonally confused and relegates what should be a series highlight to a miniboss battle on the way to the big one. Still, that miniboss battle is so thrilling and so rich that this ultimately feels like 40 minutes (the show's shortest episode runtime yet) well spent."

=== Accolades ===
TVLine named John Cena as an honorable mention as the "Performer of the Week" for the week of February 12, 2022, for his performance in the episode. The site wrote, "When Peacemaker was announced to be the focus of his own HBO Max series, few looked forward to spending more time with the foul-mouthed killer of The Suicide Squad's [Spoiler]. And yet here we are, enjoying every weekly installment — in large part due to John Cena's all-in, winning performance in the title role. Throughout the season, we've been nudged to feel bad for Chris Smith, or at least sympathize with the son of a white supremacist. But in this week's penultimate hour, Cena dove into his most powerful moments, as Chris — in the midst being whaled upon by the White Dragon, and in the wake of remembering the circumstances of his brother's death — found himself with no option but to pummel his pop in return and, ultimately, kill him. Add in a sweet vigil at Eagly's hospital bedside, followed by his joy at his sidekick's revival, and what can we say? Cena rocks."
