= Rosemary Rodriguez =

American film and television director

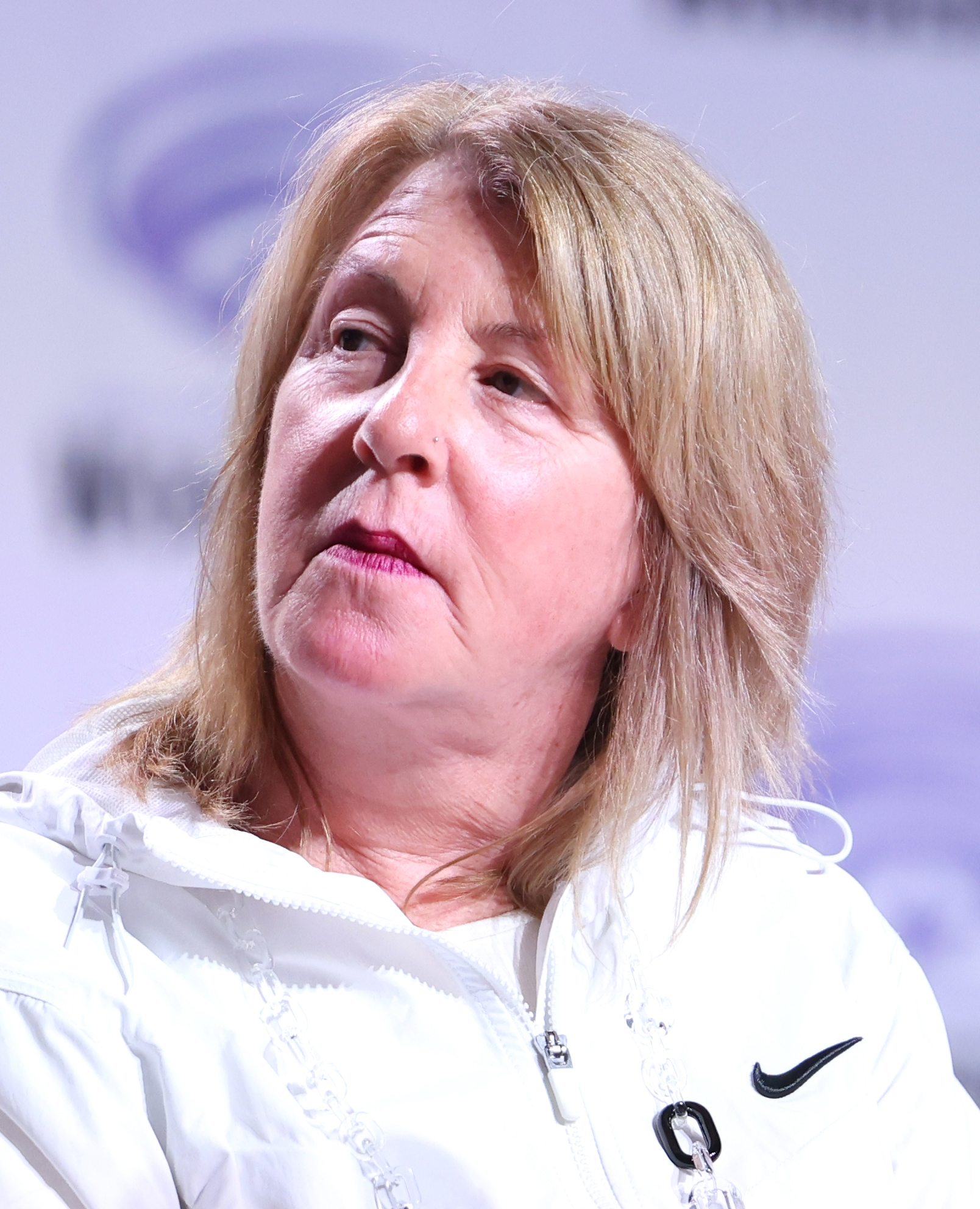
- Rodriguez in 2025
- Occupation: Television director
- Years active: 2001–present

Rosemary Rodriguez is an American film and television director. She directed the 2015 film Silver Skies starring George Hamilton. She graduated from Brandeis University.

== Acts of Worship ==
In 2001 Rodriguez wrote, produced and directed a feature film called Acts of Worship, about a young woman struggling with drug addiction. The film premiered at The Sundance Film Festival and was nominated for, and won, numerous independent film awards, including the John Cassavetes Award for Best Feature Film. It went on to many more film festival awards, including Best Film, Best Director and Best Actress (Ana Reeder) at The Santa Barbara Film Festival.

== Television career ==
Rodriguez has worked as a director on many United States television series, including Your Honor, starring Bryan Cranston, HBO’s Peacemaker with John Cena, Dickinson with Hailee Steinfeld, Truth Be Told with Octavia Spencer, The Walking Dead, Third Watch, Law & Order, Rescue Me, Castle, Criminal Minds, Undercovers, Without a Trace, Elementary and Jessica Jones. She directed 18 episodes of the drama series: The Good Wife and Blue Bloods, as well as episode 7 of the 7th Season, episode 2 in the 8th season, episode 4 of the 9th season of the AMC show The Walking Dead.

== Filmography ==
Film

Year	Title	Director	Producer	Writer
2001	Acts of Worship	Yes	Yes	Yes
2015	Silver Skies	Yes	Yes	Yes

TV movie

- The Pregnancy Pact (2010)

TV series

Year	Title	Director	Producer	Episode(s)
2004–2005	Third Watch	Yes	No	"Sins of the Fathers"
2004–2005	Third Watch	Yes	No	"Too Little, Too Late"
2005	Law & Order	Yes	No	"Life Line"
2006–2007	Without a Trace	Yes	No	"Expectations"
2006–2007	Without a Trace	Yes	No	"Connections"
2008	Canterbury's Law	Yes	No	"What Goes Around"
2009	The Unusuals	Yes	No	"The Tape Delay"
2009	Rescue Me	Yes	No	"Control"
2009	Rescue Me	Yes	No	"Wheels"
2009	Rescue Me	Yes	No	"Initiation"
2010	Castle	Yes	No	"The Third Man"
2010	Criminal Minds	Yes	No	"...A Thousand Words"
2010	White Collar	Yes	No	"Company Man"
2010	Undercovers	Yes	No	"Crashed"
2010	Blue Bloods	Yes	No	"Re-Do"
2010–2016	The Good Wife	Yes	No	"Fleas"
2010–2016	The Good Wife	Yes	No	"Cleaning House"
2010–2016	The Good Wife	Yes	No	"Silly Season"
2010–2016	The Good Wife	Yes	No	"Whiskey Tango Foxtrot"
2010–2016	The Good Wife	Yes	No	"Parenting Made Easy"
2010–2016	The Good Wife	Yes	No	"Blue Ribbon Panel"
2010–2016	The Good Wife	Yes	No	"And the Law Won"
2010–2016	The Good Wife	Yes	No	"Here Comes the Judge"
2010–2016	The Good Wife	Yes	No	"Going for the Gold"
2010–2016	The Good Wife	Yes	No	"The Decision Tree"
2010–2016	The Good Wife	Yes	No	"A Few Words"
2010–2016	The Good Wife	Yes	No	"The One Percent"
2010–2016	The Good Wife	Yes	No	"Hail Mary"
2010–2016	The Good Wife	Yes	No	"Open Source"
2010–2016	The Good Wife	Yes	No	"Winning Ugly"
2010–2016	The Good Wife	Yes	No	"Discovery"
2010–2016	The Good Wife	Yes	No	"Judged"
2010–2016	The Good Wife	Yes	No	"Party"
2011	Lights Out	Yes	No	"The Comeback"
2011	Hawthorne	Yes	No	"Just Between Friends"
2011	Hawthorne	Yes	No	"Price of Admission"
2011	Hawthorne	Yes	No	"Signed, Sealed, Delivered"
2011	Covert Affairs	Yes	No	"Horse to Water"
2012	I Just Want My Pants Back	Yes	No	"Safety Nets"
2012	I Just Want My Pants Back	Yes	No	"A Piece of Cake"
2012	I Just Want My Pants Back	Yes	No	"Love Equation"
2012	Elementary	Yes	No	"The Rat Race"
2012, 2016	Law & Order: Special Victims Unit	Yes	No	"Father Dearest"
2012, 2016	Law & Order: Special Victims Unit	Yes	No	"Collateral Damages"
2013	Red Widow	Yes	No	"The Captive"
2013	Vegas	Yes	No	"Catacombs"
2013	Vegas	Yes	No	"Unfinished Business"
2013	Low Winter Sun	Yes	No	"Catacombs"
2013	Hell on Wheels	Yes	No	"It Happened in Boston"
2014	Rake	Yes	No	"50 Shades of Gay"
2014	Manhattan	Yes	No	"The New World"
2015	Empire	Yes	No	"False Imposition"
2015, 2018	Jessica Jones	Yes	No	"AKA 1,000 Cuts"
2015, 2018	Jessica Jones	Yes	No	"AKA Shark in the Bathtub, Monster in the Bed"
2016	Outsiders	Yes	No	"Trust"
2016	Outsiders	Yes	No	"Day Most Blessed"
2016	Sex & Drugs & Rock & Roll	Yes	No	"Rolling in the Deep"
2016	Sex & Drugs & Rock & Roll	Yes	No	"Bang Bang"
2016–2018	The Walking Dead	Yes	No	"Sing Me a Song"
2016–2018	The Walking Dead	Yes	No	"The Damned"
2016–2018	The Walking Dead	Yes	No	"The Obliged"
2017	Pure Genius	Yes	No	"Grace"
2017	Sneaky Pete	Yes	No	"The Turn"
2018	The Tick	Yes	No	"Risky Bismuth"
2018	Rise	Yes	Yes	"Most of All to Dream"
2018	Rise	Yes	Yes	"What Flowers May Bloom"
2019–2021	Truth Be Told	Yes	No	"Black People in the Neighborhood"
2019–2021	Truth Be Told	Yes	No	"Ghosts at the Feast"
2020	Home Before Dark	Yes	Yes	"Sting Like a Bee"
2020	Home Before Dark	Yes	Yes	"The Bird, Man"
2020	Home Before Dark	Yes	Yes	"Bigger Than All of Us"
2021	Dickinson	Yes	No	"The Only Ghost I Ever Saw"
2021	Dickinson	Yes	No	"The Daisy Follows Soft the Sun"
2022	Peacemaker	Yes	No	"Monkey Dory"
2023	Your Honor	Yes	No	"Part Nineteen"
2023	Your Honor	Yes	No	"Part Twenty"
2024	Elsbeth	Yes	No	"Love Knocked Off"
2024	Elsbeth	Yes	No	"A Fitting Finale"
2026	It's Not Like That	Yes	No	"The Lori Thing"
2026	It's Not Like That	Yes	No	"Hope and Peace and Joy and Love"
2026	Cupertino	Yes	No	"Harper"
