= A Whole New Whirled =

- Peacemaker episode
- Episode no.: Season 1 Episode 1
- Directed by: James Gunn
- Written by: James Gunn
- Cinematography by: Michael Bonvillain
- Editing by: Fred Raskin
- Original air date: January 13, 2022
- Running time: 46 minutes

Guest appearance
- Viola Davis as Amanda Waller (uncredited)

Episode chronology
← Previous —	Next → "Best Friends, For Never"
- Peacemaker season 1

"A Whole New Whirled" is the series premiere of the American black comedy superhero drama television series Peacemaker, a spin-off from the 2021 film The Suicide Squad. The episode was written and directed by the series creator James Gunn. It originally aired on HBO Max on January 13, 2022, alongside the two follow-up episodes.

The series is set after the events of The Suicide Squad, and follows Chris Smith / Peacemaker. Smith returns to his home but is forced to work with A.R.G.U.S. agents on a classified operation only known as "Project Butterfly". Smith also has to deal with his personal demons, including feeling haunted by memories of people he killed for "peace", as well as reconnecting with his estranged father.

The series premiere received positive reviews from critics, who highlighted its humor, writing and performances, particularly John Cena.

== Plot ==
Five months after the events in Corto Maltese, (Note: As depicted in The Suicide Squad (2021).) Chris Smith / Peacemaker has recovered from injuries suffered there and is discharged from the hospital. Knowing that he has yet to complete his prison sentence, Peacemaker confirms with janitor Jamil that no one is looking for him. As he leaves the hospital, a nurse secretly reports his exit to "Mr. Murn".

Peacemaker takes a taxi to his trailer home; unable to pay for the ride, Peacemaker gives up his helmet to the taxi driver. Peacemaker finds that someone called "Vigilante" has left many voicemails for him. Peacemaker is then confronted at gunpoint by a team of four: leader Clemson Murn, newcomer Leota Adebayo, and A.R.G.U.S. agents Emilia Harcourt and John Economos; all were assigned to complete the "Project Butterfly" mission for Amanda Waller. Murn gives Peacemaker the choice of returning to Belle Reve prison or joining the mission to kill "Butterflies"; Peacemaker reluctantly accepts the latter. Murn warns Peacemaker that the bomb in Peacemaker's head would be activated if Peacemaker abandoned the mission.

Peacemaker visits his father, Auggie, to retrieve Peacemaker's pet bald eagle, Eagly, and acquire a new helmet. Auggie greets Peacemaker coldly, mocks him as weak, but gives the helmet, hoping that Peacemaker will use it against communists, black people, Jews, and Catholics. Peacemaker has dinner with his team; Murn gives him a dossier of an assassination target: a U.S. Senator. A diner employee, Adrian Chase, recognizes Peacemaker and celebrates. Peacemaker dismisses Adrian as his friend Gut Chase's mentally ill brother.

After dinner, Peacemaker tells Adebayo that he does not trust Murn, who is an infamous mercenary. Peacemaker follows Harcourt to a bar, where she violently fends off a patron that threatened her. When Peacemaker propositions sex with Harcourt, she angrily rejects him and leaves. Meanwhile, Adebayo has a call with her mother, Waller, who discusses plans for Adebayo that are secret from the team, including Waller's command for Adebayo to plant a forged diary in Peacemaker's home.

Peacemaker interacts with a woman named Annie Sturphausen at the bar; they proceed to have sex at her apartment. She then attacks Peacemaker with a knife and displays superhuman strength as they fight. Peacemaker jumps from the apartment window to the parking lot below; Sturphausen follows. Peacemaker retrieves his helmet, activating its sonic boom weapon to destroy Sturphausen and part of the parking lot, which attracts the local police.

== Production ==
=== Development ===
In September 2020, HBO Max announced that it gave a series order to a series focusing on Christopher Smith / Peacemaker, portrayed by John Cena in The Suicide Squad. James Gunn, who wrote and directed The Suicide Squad, would serve as showrunner and direct many episodes, while Cena would also serve as co-executive producer. For Gunn, he viewed the series as "an opportunity to delve into current world issues through the lens of this superhero/supervillain/and world's biggest douchebag."

For influence, Gunn used Better Call Saul, Spartacus, the V series franchise, as well as the 1990 film Captain America. He particularly highlighted Better Call Saul in helping him develop the series, explaining, "Both Saul and Chris are kind of sad-sack characters who are really good at one thing and then really bad at a lot of other things. So I think it's really just taking that incredibly smart dialogue, that relaxed nature of grounded life and then mixing that with the other things that I wanted to do with the show."

=== Casting ===
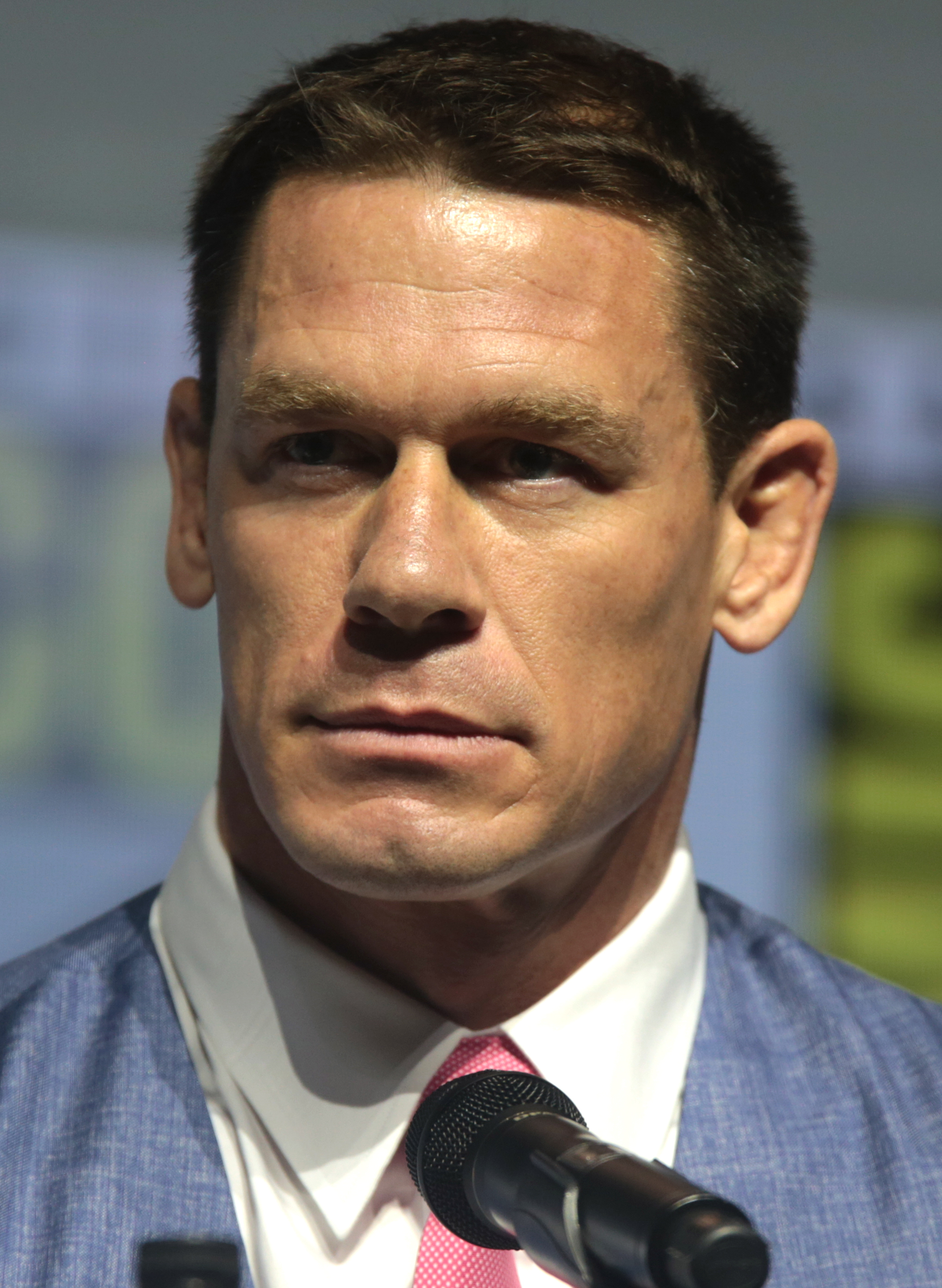
John Cena serves as co-executive producer and main lead actor in the series.

The announcement of the series in September 2020 confirmed that John Cena would reprise his role as Christopher Smith / Peacemaker. Other actors that also reprise their roles from The Suicide Squad include Steve Agee as John Economos and Jennifer Holland as Emilia Harcourt.

Shortly after the series order, Danielle Brooks, Robert Patrick, Chris Conrad and Chukwudi Iwuji were announced as series regulars. In May 2021, it was announced that Conrad would leave the series due to creative differences, with his role being recast with Freddie Stroma.

In December 2020, Annie Chang and Lochlyn Munro joined the series to recur as Detectives Sophie Song and Larry Fitzgibbon. While they are credited in the opening sequence, they do not appear in the episode.

Viola Davis makes an uncredited cameo appearance as Amanda Waller, reprising her role from the DC Extended Universe (DCEU). As the series is filmed in Vancouver, the crew visited Davis in Los Angeles to film her scene.

=== Visual effects ===
The episode introduces Eagly, Smith's pet bald eagle. The crew initially tried to film the scenes with a real eagle, but found it difficult with the eagle's behavior. They decided to use visual effects to create Eagly, which was accomplished by Weta Digital, which worked previously with Gunn in some of his films. Eagly's voice is provided by Dee Bradley Baker, who previously worked with Gunn in The Suicide Squad.

== Critical reception ==
"A Whole New Whirled" received positive reviews from critics. Samantha Nelson of IGN gave the three-episode premiere a "great" 8 out of 10 rating and wrote in his verdict, "Peacemaker isn't quite as sharply written as Amazon's The Boys, but James Gunn is aiming for the same sort of subversive superhero show, using excessive violence and biting humor to deconstruct the failings of the genre. The three-episode premiere offers a goofy takedown of vigilantism while hinting at bigger and darker plots to come."

Jarrod Jones of The A.V. Club gave the three-episode premiere an "A–" grade and wrote, "Peacemaker is a stacked deck of fearsome insanity and there's a lot to accept in these first three episodes. It's vulgar, violent, prone to non sequitur, and has more than one dance sequence in store for you. But don't you dare let its ceaseless barrage of profanity, nudity, and slaughter dupe you into thinking otherwise: James Gunn's Peacemaker comes packing, among other things, a beating heart." Charles Bramesco of The Guardian gave the first three episodes a score of 3 out of 5, writing "James Gunn's Suicide Squad character gets his own HBO Max series with mixed results but a winning central performance."

Alan Sepinwall of Rolling Stone gave the three-episode premiere a 4 star rating out of 5 and wrote, "Between the blood and guts, the slapstick, the political satire, and the musical digressions, there is a lot going on here. Yet the series functions as a sincere character study of its flawed hero — and the unfortunate souls who have to work alongside him — just enough for the joke to never quite wear thin. Even in a wildly oversaturated market for tales of hypermuscular men and women punching their way to justice, Peacemaker stands out. You'll wanna taste it, even the parts that are in incredibly bad taste." Alec Bojalad of Den of Geek gave the three-episode premiere a 4 star rating out of 5 and wrote, "Ultimately, Peacemaker is another win for the suddenly surprisingly competitive DC Comics TV landscape."
