= Nhut Le =

American and Vietnamese actor (born 1997 or 1998)

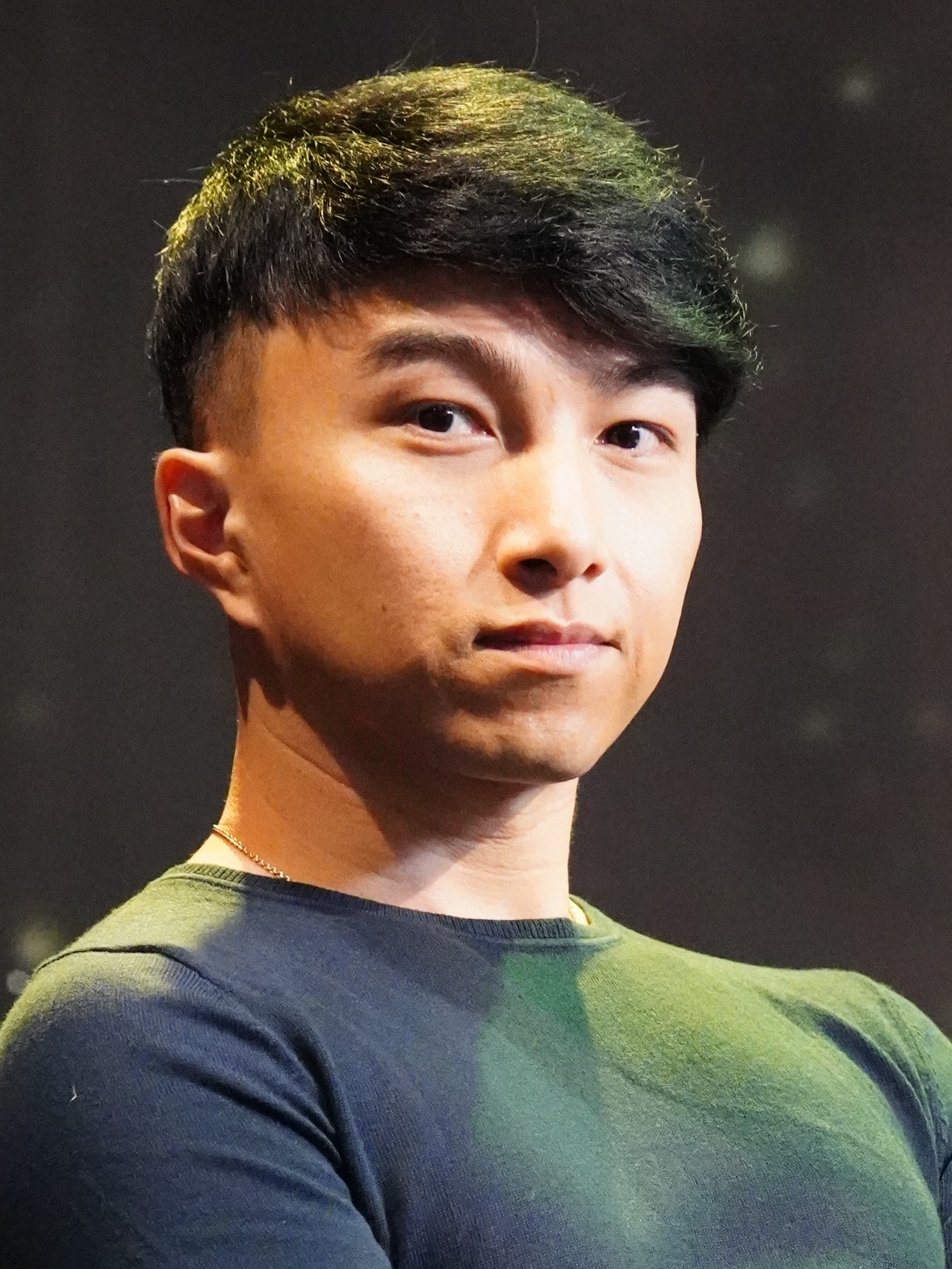
- Le in 2026
- Born: Nhut Le; September 6, 1997 or 1998 (age 27–29); Ho Chi Minh City, Vietnam

Nhut Le (Vietnamese: [nə lē]; born September 6, 1997 or 1998) is an American and Vietnamese actor, writer, and producer. From 2013 to 2015, he appeared in a recurring role on the sketch comedy series Kroll Show. He gained wider recognition for his role as Judomaster in the first season of the 2022 HBO Max series Peacemaker. In 2025, he reprised the role in the second season of the series.

== Early life ==
Le was born in Ho Chi Minh City, Vietnam on September 6 in 1997 or 1998. He immigrated to the United States with his family when he was six years old. He has one sibling. He took an interest in acting during fourth grade when he was cast in a high school production of the musical, South Pacific.

He studied Wushu at the Shaolin Wushu Centre in Los Angeles.

== Career ==
Le's first film role was in the 2013 martial arts comedy film Martial Science. He later went on to appear on the Kroll Show and Raven's Home. During this time he created and starred alongside Natalie Palamides in the 8-episode comedy series Stardumb.

In 2018, he created and performed in his second series project Gey Gardens, a parody of the 1975 documentary Grey Gardens.

In 2021, he was cast as Judomaster in the DC Extended Universe series Peacemaker. He later reprised the role in the second season, now set in the continuity of the DC Universe. Le says he had to infuse the character with his own ideas about personality, motives, and behavior, as the comics and the first season script had little for him to work with. Positive viewer reaction assuaged his fears that he hadn't gotten it right, and gave him the confidence to expand the character in the second season. This included letting viewers know Judomaster was Vietnamese and homosexual.

Outside of acting and filmmaking, Le works as a ceramics artist. He sells pieces through his brand, 3CirclePottery.

== Personal life ==
Le is 5 feet (1.5 m) tall. Growing up in Vietnam, Le was familiar with and loved superheroes like Superman, and anime and manga like Sailor Moon, Dragon Ball, and Pokémon.

Le is gay. He told Out magazine that he used his own sexuality and mannerisms to bring his Judomaster character to life.

== Filmography ==
=== Television ===
Year	Title	Role	Notes
2013-2015	Kroll Show	Inuit Andy/Blisteritos Kid	7 Episodes
2014	Los Feliz, 90027	Gay 2	Episode: Pilot
2015	Stardumb	Chelsea Adams	Main Role. Also writer, producer
2015	Bitch Please	Goblin	Episode: "Halloween House"
2017	Jenny Trump	Eddie	Main Role
2017	Score	Person	Episode: "Sweaty Betty's Date"
2018	Gey Gardens	Little Eddie	Main Role. Also writer, producer
2018	Raven's Home	Nerdidorken	Episode: "Weirder Things"
2022-2025	Peacemaker	Rip Jagger / Judomaster	Recurring role; Season 1 and 2
2022	Backstage Features	Self	
2022	Popternative	Self	

=== Film ===
Year	Title	Role	Notes
2013	Martial Science	Various	
2014	Jinxed	Kenny	Short Film
2014	Library Ghosts	Creepy Librarian	Short Film
2016	The Cost	The Monster	Short Film
2017	Comfort	Tao	Short Film. Also writer, producer
