= Lex Luthor in other media =

Adaptations of Lex Luthor in other media
- Original source: Comics published by DC Comics
- First appearance: Action Comics #23 (April 1940)

Print publications
- Novel(s): Last Son of Krypton (1978); It's Superman! (2005)

Films and television
- Film(s): Atom Man vs. Superman (1950); Superman: The Movie (1978); Superman II (1980); Superman IV: The Quest for Peace (1987); Superman: Brainiac Attacks (2006); Superman Returns (2006); Superman II: The Richard Donner Cut (2006); Superman: Doomsday (2007); Superman/Batman: Public Enemies (2009); Justice League: Crisis on Two Earths (2010); All-Star Superman (2011); Lego Batman: The Movie - DC Super Heroes Unite (2013); Justice League: The Flashpoint Paradox (2013); JLA Adventures: Trapped in Time (2014); Justice League: Throne of Atlantis (2015); Justice League: Gods and Monsters (2015); Batman v Superman: Dawn of Justice (2016); Justice League vs. Teen Titans (2016); Justice League (2017); Zack Snyder's Justice League (2021); Superman (2025)
- Television show(s): Superboy (1988); Lois & Clark: The New Adventures of Superman (1993); Superman: The Animated Series (1996); Smallville (2001); Justice League (2001); Justice League Unlimited (2004); The Batman (2004); Krypto the Superdog (2005); Batman: The Brave and the Bold (2008); Young Justice (2010); Justice League Action (2016); Supergirl (2017); Titans (2022); Superman & Lois (2023); My Adventures with Superman (2023)

Lex Luthor is a supervillain appearing in American comic books published by DC Comics. As Superman's archenemy, he has been portrayed in almost every Superman media franchise and adaptation.

Lex Luthor is a major character within the Superman mythos and has appeared in many of Superman's adaptations into other media. The character is originally depicted as a mad scientist and later depicted as a wealthy, power-mad American business magnate running the technology company LexCorp (or LuthorCorp) which is based in the city of Metropolis. His portrayal in feature films ranges from being a vain criminal interested in real estate development to that of a genius who heads LexCorp.

== Television ==
=== Live-action ===
- A young Lex Luthor appears in Superboy (1988), portrayed by Scott James Wells in the first season and subsequently by Sherman Howard. This version was raised by an abusive father and neglectful mother before becoming rich after taking out an insurance policy on his parents and killing them. By the time he enters college, he became a minor criminal preoccupied with outdoing Superboy. Additionally, he goes bald while being rescued from a lab fire by Superboy. Vowing revenge, Luthor kills businessman Warren Eckworth and tries unsuccessfully to use Eckworth's "Superboy Gun" project to kill Superboy.
- Lex Luthor appears in Lois & Clark: The New Adventures of Superman, portrayed by John Shea. This version is the third-richest person in the world and a philanderer who publicly masquerades as a beloved humanitarian with assistance from Nigel St. John (portrayed by Tony Jay). In the first season finale, amidst his wedding to Lois Lane, his criminal nature is exposed and Luthor commits suicide to avoid prison. In the second season, Luthor's ex-wife Arianna Carlin steals his body from the coroner's office before his personal physician Gretchen Kelly freezes him so she can eventually revive him. While she succeeds, he is rendered temporarily bald until the third season, in which he loses his wealth and is forced to work for Intergang. He later murders Gretchen before Superman sends Luthor to prison to serve a double life sentence. After using a clone of the President to grant himself a pardon, Luthor regains his wealth and attempts to ruin Clark Kent and Lois' wedding with a clone of Lois, finding out Superman's true identity in the process, only to die in the destruction of his underground subway hideout. Additionally, his illegitimate children, computer geek billionaire Jaxon Xavier and the deformed Lex Luthor Jr. appear in the episodes "Virtually Destroyed", "Faster Than a Speeding Vixen", "Shadow of a Doubt", and "Voice from the Past", portrayed by Andy Berman and Keith Brunsmann, respectively.
- Lex Luthor appears in Smallville, portrayed by Michael Rosenbaum. He begins the series as an amicable 21 year old son of merciless billionaire Lionel Luthor (portrayed by John Glover), having been sent to Smallville, to reprioritize the production of the Smallville power plant, seemingly as punishment by his father for past aggressions. He soon becomes quick friends with a teenage Clark Kent (portrayed by Tom Welling), the future Superman, after an incident in which he saved his life after a car accident. Their friendship continues over multiple years and he ends up helping with many dilemmas Clark comes across in his personal life and while dealing with threats, but never learning the truth about his friend until much later on. However, as the series goes along, Lex's anger and resentment towards Clark and Lionel leads him further towards villainy and competition with the future Man of Steel, with their rivalry being cemented to each other by the finale.
- Lex Luthor appears in media set in the Arrowverse, portrayed by Jon Cryer as an adult and Aidan Fink as a child. He primarily appears in the TV series Supergirl and makes an additional appearance in the crossover "Crisis on Infinite Earths". Lex appears throughout the last 3 seasons of the show as a major antagonist after being alluded to in prior seasons.
- Lex Luthor was meant to appear in Metropolis, in which he and Lois Lane would have worked together to investigate fringe science and expose the eponymous city's secrets. The series was to be developed by Gotham producers John Stephens and Danny Cannon and Warner Bros. Television as of 2018, but no further news came of the project's status.
- Lex Luthor appears in Titans, portrayed by Payne Novak as a child and Titus Welliver as an adult. He is depicted in his late 60s, slowly dying from Kryptonite poisoning and aware of Superman's identity as Clark Kent, wishing to form a bond with his biological clone son Connor. His father Lionel claims that Lex and Clark Kent used to be good friends. After meeting with Connor and making plans with him, he is killed by May Bennett, who he was working with in the past until he disagreed with her plan. For the rest of season, Connor grieves his father and attempts to mimic his behavior as he goes after May and her son Sebastian.
- Lex Luthor appears in Superman & Lois, portrayed by Michael Cudlitz. Similarly to the Arrowverse incarnation, Lex is depicted as being in jail prior to the start of the series, framed for the death of a rival crime boss Boss Moxie. He is depicted as more of a manipulative crime lord criminal with a sadistic edge, with less of the traditional super intelligence of the character. He is first mentioned in Season 1 as an alias an alternate universe John Henry Irons, is forced to use when operating a power suit previously owned by an alternate Lex. After his return near the end of Season 3, Lex becomes the main villain of the final season, being responsible for transforming an alternate Bizarro Superman into Doomsday and successfully killing Superman. Following on from this, he gets into conflict with the Kent family and a revived Clark, stealing and taking control of Iron's suit to fight them, with the series ending on him being defeated and sent back to jail.
- The DCU version of Lex Luthor appears in the Peacemaker episode "Ignorance Is Chris", portrayed again by Nicholas Hoult.

=== Animation ===
- Lex Luthor appears in The New Adventures of Superman, voiced by Ray Owens. This version is stated to be "the world's greatest criminal scientist" and temporarily sports a slimmer physique in the third season.
- Lex Luthor appears in the Super Friends franchise, voiced by Stanley Jones. This version is the leader of the Legion of Doom. He first appears in Challenge of the Superfriends and makes subsequent appearances in The World's Greatest Super Friends episode "Lex Luthor Strikes Back", Super Friends: The Legendary Super Powers Show, and The Super Powers Team: Galactic Guardians.
- Lex Luthor appears in the Sunnyland Refining Company Superman Peanut Butter commercial.
- Lex Luthor appears in Superman (1988), voiced by Michael Bell.
- Montana Max (voiced by Danny Cooksey) assumes the role of "Wex Wuthor" in the Tiny Toon Adventures segments "Superbabs" and "New Class Day".
- Lex Luthor appears in series set in the DC Animated Universe (DCAU), voiced by Clancy Brown.
  - First appearing in Superman: The Animated Series, Luthor is a corrupt businessman who controls most of Metropolis with assistance from Mercy Graves. Despite coming into conflict with and being foiled by Superman numerous times, he avoids imprisonment due to lack of evidence.
  - In Justice League, Luthor loses LexCorp after Batman, Green Lantern, and J'onn J'onzz of the eponymous League expose his criminal activities. Additionally, he discovers he is suffering from terminal blood cancer caused by long-term exposure to Kryptonite. While in prison, he bribes the Ultra-Humanite into freeing him, developing a powered suit to delay his cancer, and helping him form the Injustice Gang to combat the League. However, the Ultra-Humanite eventually betrays Luthor. Following a failed attempt to use Amazo to fight the League, Luthor helps them defeat the Justice Lords, receives a pardon, and considers entering politics.
  - In Justice League Unlimited, Luthor mounts a presidential campaign to enrage Superman while secretly funding Project Cadmus to acquire their technology and build an android body inspired by Amazo for himself. While he is thwarted by Amanda Waller and the League's founding members, Brainiac emerges from within Luthor's body, having laid dormant within him for years, and fuses with him in an attempt to recreate the universe. However, they are defeated by the Flash before Luthor is re-arrested. After escaping prison, Luthor becomes obsessed with resurrecting Brainiac and regaining his lost "godhood". In pursuit of this, he joins and eventually takes over the Secret Society, only for his efforts to culminate in Darkseid killing most of them. Luthor leads the survivors in helping the League foil Darkseid's invasion, during which he gains Metron's help in obtaining the Anti-Life Equation and uses it on himself and Darkseid.
- Lex Luthor appears in Robot Chicken, voiced initially by Seth Green and later by Donald Faison (in "Toyz in the Hood"), Jim Cummings (in "Due to Constraints of Time and Budget"), and Alfred Molina (in the DC Comics specials and "Triple Hot Dog Sandwich on Wheat"). In the Robot Chicken DC Comics Special, Robot Chicken DC Comics Special 2: Villains in Paradise, and Robot Chicken DC Comics Special III: Magical Friendship, Luthor serves as leader of the Legion of Doom, formed a band called "Sexx Luthor" when he was in high school, and joined several of his multiversal doppelgangers to form a boy band called "Sexx II Men".
- Lex Luthor appears in the Krypto the Superdog, voiced by Brian Dobson. This version has a pet iguana named Ignatius (voiced by Scott McNeil) who shares his intelligence, vanity, and moral ambivalence.
- A distant relative of Lex Luthor's named Alexis Luthor appears in Legion of Super Heroes, voiced by Tara Strong. Similarly to Luthor, she possesses skill with machinery and access to a corporation and is stated to be the "richest girl in the galaxy". Additionally, she loses her hair while fighting the Legion.
- Lex Luthor appears in The Batman two-part episode "The Batman/Superman Story", voiced again by Clancy Brown.
- Lex Luthor appears in Batman: The Brave and the Bold, voiced by Kevin Michael Richardson. This version is the leader of the Legion of Doom.
  - Additionally, an original character based on Luthor, an alien mad scientist from the planet Zur-En-Arrh called Rohtul, appears in the episode "The Super-Batman of Planet X!", voiced by Clancy Brown. He is depicted as the archenemy of the Batman of Zur-En-Arrh.
- Lex Luthor appears in the Mad segment "Zeke and Lex Luthor".
- Lex Luthor appears in Young Justice, voiced by Mark Rolston. This version is a leading member of the Light who later becomes Secretary-General of the United Nations during the third season before being ousted from his position in the finale.
- Elmer Fudd (voiced by Billy West) assumes the role of Lex Luthor in The Looney Tunes Show episode "Super Rabbit".
- Lex Luthor appears in Justice League Action, voiced by James Woods. This version, in addition to his traditional warsuit, wields several other armors, including a grey variant that can generate red sun radiation and a black and purple nanotechnology-based suit that can repel anything in a surrounding radius, under which he is known as Repulse.
- Lex appears in DC Super Hero Girls (2019), voiced by Will Friedle. This version is a teenager with a pronounced sibling rivalry with his sister Lena Luthor.
- Lex Luthor appears in Harley Quinn, voiced by Giancarlo Esposito in the first four seasons and Wendell Pierce in the fifth season. This version is the leader of the Legion of Doom.
  - Luthor appears in Kite Man: Hell Yeah!, voiced initially by Lance Reddick and subsequently by Amuche Chukudebelu following Reddick's death during production.
- Lex Luthor appears in My Adventures with Superman, voiced by Max Mittelman. This version initially works as an assistant to Professor Ivo in the first season before allying with Task Force X and using their resources to found LexCorp in the second season. In the third season, Luthor saved Hank Henshaw, turning him into Cyborg Superman, until he discovered Hank's dark intentions. Luthor reveals his next project, the Eradicator, created from his and Superman's DNA. However, after causing this incident, he's arrested by Amanda Waller, who subsequently shuts down LexCorp, and then he decides to help in how to stop the Eradicator. However, Luthor warns Waller that new galaxies have emerged since the destruction of Kandor.
  - In a potential future depicted in the episode "All's Fair in Love and W.O.R.M.S.", Luthor is killed by Hank's forces, after sending Superman and Lois Lane's son, Jon Kent, back in time.
  - In a second potential future depicted in the episode "The Death of Superman", Luthor now rules the world known as "Reign of the Supermen".
  - Additionally, an alternate universe version of Luthor as Good Luthor appears in the episode "The Ex-Games", as part of the team by Ms. Gsptlsnz.

== Film ==
=== Live-action ===
- Predating the name Lex, Luthor appears with no other name in the 1950 Columbia theatrical serial Atom Man vs. Superman, portrayed by Lyle Talbot. Luthor is the principal villain, having a masked alter ego, the Atom Man. He is a public-facing businessman running a legitimate television station as cover while secretly conducting attacks on Metropolis with a disintegration/reassembly device and a plan involving kryptonite to weaken Superman.
- Lex Luthor appears in Superman (1978), Superman II, Superman IV: The Quest for Peace, and Superman II: The Richard Donner Cut portrayed by Gene Hackman. This version is depicted as Superman's comedic foil.
  - An alternate version of Luthor appears in Superman Returns, portrayed by Kevin Spacey. For this portrayal, he possesses a drier, more straightforward personality while retaining a humorous streak.
- Lex Luthor appears in films set in the DC Extended Universe (DCEU), portrayed by Jesse Eisenberg. Prior to Eisenberg's casting, Luthor was discussed as taking inspiration from Bill Gates, Richard Branson, and Brad Pitt. This version’s grievance against Superman is depicted as more religious, believing and wanting to depict Superman as a devil on Earth and enacting terrorist acts to insight fear and distrust against him. He first appears in the film Batman v Superman: Dawn of Justice and makes further appearances in Justice League and Zack Snyder's Justice League.
- Lex Luthor appears in the DC Universe (DCU) film Superman (2025), portrayed by Nicholas Hoult. This version is depicted as having owned and operating a prison dimension, where he hosts personal and political enemies, as well as being the founder of metahuman security group Planetwatch. By the end of the movie, Luthor is imprisoned for manipulating a political conflict against Superman and almost causing the destruction of Metropolis, following evidence presented by the Daily Planet. Luthor is expected to return in the follow-up film Man of Tomorrow.

=== Animation ===
Lex Luthor as depicted in Justice League: Crisis on Two Earths

- An amalgamated incarnation of Lex Luthor appears in Superman: Brainiac Attacks, voiced by Powers Boothe. This version is visually based on his design in Superman: The Animated Series coupled with a comedic personality inspired by Gene Hackman's portrayal.
- Lex Luthor appears in Superman: Doomsday, voiced by James Marsters.
- Lex Luthor makes a non-speaking cameo appearance in Justice League: The New Frontier.
- President Lex Luthor appears in Superman/Batman: Public Enemies, voiced again by Clancy Brown.
- An alternate universe version of Lex Luthor appears in Justice League: Crisis on Two Earths, voiced by Chris Noth. This version was the leader of his world's heroes until they were killed by the Crime Syndicate. Additionally, the "prime" Luthor makes a non-speaking cameo appearance as an inmate of Stryker's Island.
- Lex Luthor appears in All-Star Superman, voiced by Anthony LaPaglia.
- Lex Luthor appears in Lego Batman: The Movie - DC Super Heroes Unite, voiced again by Clancy Brown.
- Lex Luthor appears in films set in the DC Animated Movie Universe, voiced initially by Steve Blum and subsequently by Rainn Wilson. This version is the leader of the Legion of Doom who later becomes a probationary member of the Justice League after helping them escape another dimension before he is killed by Paradooms.
- Lex Luthor appears in JLA Adventures: Trapped in Time, voiced by Fred Tatasciore. This version is the leader of the Legion of Doom.
- Lex Luthor appears in Lego DC Comics: Batman Be-Leaguered, voiced by John DiMaggio.
- Lex Luthor appears in Lego DC Comics Super Heroes: Justice League vs. Bizarro League, voiced again by John DiMaggio.
- Lex Luthor appears in DC Super Friends, voiced by Travis Willingham.
- An alternate universe version of Lex Luthor appears in Justice League: Gods and Monsters, voiced by Jason Isaacs. This version is a scientist and the leader of "Project Fair Play" (a contingency plan to kill the Justice League if necessary) who was paralyzed by an unspecified illness.
- Lex Luthor makes a non-speaking cameo appearance in Teen Titans Go! To the Movies.
- Lex Luthor appears in The Lego Movie 2: The Second Part, voiced by Ike Barinholtz.
- Lex Luthor appears in films set in the Tomorrowverse.
  - Luthor first appears in Superman: Man of Tomorrow, voiced by Zachary Quinto.
  - Luthor appears in the three-part film Justice League: Crisis on Infinite Earths, voiced again by Zachary Quinto in the first part and by Corey Stoll in the third part.
- An alternate universe version of Lex Luthor appears in Superman: Red Son, voiced by Diedrich Bader.
- Lex Luthor appears in Teen Titans Go! & DC Super Hero Girls: Mayhem in the Multiverse, voiced again by Will Friedle.
- Lex Luthor appears in DC League of Super-Pets, voiced by Marc Maron.
- Lex Luthor appears in Batman and Superman: Battle of the Super Sons, voiced by Darin De Paul.
- Lex Luthor appears in Scooby-Doo! and Krypto, Too!, voiced by Charles Halford. This version is the leader of the Legion of Doom.

== Video games ==
- Lex Luthor appears in Superman (1979).
- Lex Luthor appears as a boss in Superman 64. This version is a member of the Superman Revenge Squad.
- Lex Luthor appears in Superman: Shadow of Apokolips, voiced again by Clancy Brown.
- Lex Luthor appears in Superman: The Man of Steel, voiced by J. S. Gilbert.
- Lex Luthor appears in Justice League: Injustice for All. This version is the leader of the Injustice Gang.
- Lex Luthor appears in Superman Returns, voiced by Kevin Spacey.
- Lex Luthor appears as a playable character in Mortal Kombat vs. DC Universe, motion-captured by Christopher Piereman and voiced by Joe J. Thomas.
- Lex Luthor appears in DC Universe Online, voiced again by James Marsters. This version is a leading member of the Secret Society.
- Lex Luthor appears in LittleBigPlanet 2, voiced by Kerry Shale.
- Lex Luthor appears in Scribblenauts Unmasked: A DC Comics Adventure. This version is a member of the Injustice League.
- Lex Luthor appears in DC Super Hero Girls: Teen Power, voiced again by Will Friedle.
- Lex Luthor appears as a playable character in Injustice: Gods Among Us, voiced again by Mark Rolston. Additionally, an alternate universe version appears in the story mode as a member of Batman's Insurgency who works undercover within Superman's Regime until he is killed by Superman.
- Lex Luthor appears in Young Justice: Legacy, voiced again by Mark Rolston.
- Lex Luthor makes a vocal cameo appearance in Batman: Arkham Knight via Bruce Wayne's voicemail, voiced by Keith Silverstein.
- Arkhamverse Earth 1 and Earth 2 incarnations of Lex Luthor appear in Suicide Squad: Kill the Justice League, both voiced by Corey Burton.

=== Lego series ===
- Lex Luthor appears as the final boss of, an optional boss, and unlockable playable character in Lego Batman 2: DC Super Heroes, voiced again by Clancy Brown.
- Lex Luthor appears as a playable character in Lego Batman 3: Beyond Gotham, voiced again by Clancy Brown. This version is the leader of the Legion of Doom and a temporary Indigo Lantern.
- Lex Luthor appears as a boss in Lego Dimensions, voiced by Travis Willingham.
- Lex Luthor appears in Lego DC Super-Villains, voiced again by Clancy Brown.

== Miscellaneous ==
- Lex Luthor appears in Superman: Last Son of Krypton, written by Elliot S. Maggin. This version is a scientific genius and childhood classmate of Clark Kent's from Smallville who unknowingly caused an accident that burnt off his hair, for which he blamed Kent. As an adult, he chooses to stay in prison to work on his scientific theories as he finds manhunts tedious.
- Lex Luthor appears in Superman: Doomsday & Beyond, voiced by William Hootkins.
- An alternate timeline version of Lex Luthor appears in It's Superman!, written by Tom De Haven. This version is the alderman of 1930s New York City and owner of Lexco who, feeling that his life is missing something, becomes inspired by a failed attempt on his life to create Lexbots, which brings him into conflict with Superman.
- A young Lex Luthor appears in Legion of Super Heroes in the 31st Century #13. This version does not yet show hostility towards Superman.
- An alternate timeline version of Lex Luthor appears in Enemies & Allies, written by Kevin J. Anderson. This version is the owner of LuthorCorp from the 1950s. Throughout the novel, he bribes or blackmails Wayne Enterprises' board of directors into helping him steal their company's designs to purchase military contracts. Additionally, he has formed a secret alliance with Russian general Ceridov, who discovered Kryptonite in Siberia, in an effort to take over the world together. Ultimately, he is foiled and defeated by Superman and placed on death row.
- Lex Luthor appears in DC Heroes United, voiced by Jabari Rayford.
- Lex Luthor appears in the crossover miniseries DC X Sonic the Hedgehog.
