= Jonathan and Martha Kent =

Fictional adoptive parents of Superman

- Jonathan and Martha Kent with an infant Kal-El in Action Comics #977 (April 2017). Art by Ian Churchill.

Publication information
- Publisher: DC Comics
- First appearance: Superman #1 (June 1939)
- Created by: Jerry Siegel; Joe Shuster

In-story information
- Full name: Mary Kent (1939); Eben Kent (1942); Sarah Kent (1942); Martha Kent (1948); John Kent (1948); Jonathan Kent (1950); Marthe Kent (1951); Martha Hudson Clark Kent (1961)
- Supporting character of: Superman; Superboy
- Notable aliases: Ma and Pa Kent

Jonathan Kent and Martha Kent (often referred to as "Pa" and "Ma" Kent, respectively) are fictional characters appearing in American comic books published by DC Comics. They are the adoptive parents of Superman, and live in the rural town of Smallville, Kansas. In most versions of Superman's origin story, Jonathan and Martha find him as the infant Kal-El after he crash-lands on Earth following the destruction of his home planet, Krypton. They adopt him shortly thereafter, renaming him Clark Kent, "Clark" being Martha's maiden name.

The Kents are usually portrayed as loving parents who instill within Clark a strong moral compass, and they encourage Clark to use his powers for the betterment of humanity. In some continuities, Martha is also the one who creates Clark's superhero costume, often from the baby blankets Clark's biological parents had swaddled him in before enclosing him in the capsule, which are found to withstand virtually all hazards.

In pre-Crisis continuity, the Kents die shortly after Clark's high school graduation. In post-Crisis continuity, they both remain alive even after Clark becomes an adult, being supporting characters until Jonathan's death during an attack by the supervillain Brainiac. Martha remained a supporting character in Superman comics until 2011's "The New 52" continuity reboot, in which both she and her husband are deceased, having been killed by a drunk driver, although this accident was later revealed to be the work of Doctor Manhattan of the Watchmen universe, specifically to see how Clark would fare in becoming Superman without their guidance. As of the "DC Rebirth" relaunch (2019), both of them are alive.

Glenn Ford and Phyllis Thaxter portrayed Jonathan and Martha in the 1978 film Superman. Annette O'Toole and John Schneider portrayed the couple in the 2001 series Smallville. Eva Marie Saint portrayed Martha in the 2006 film Superman Returns. Kevin Costner and Diane Lane portray Jonathan and Martha Kent in the DC Extended Universe. Michele Scarabelli and Fred Henderson portray the couple in the 2021 series Superman & Lois. Pruitt Taylor Vince and Neva Howell portrayed Jonathan and Martha in the DC Universe film Superman (2025).

== Fictional character biography ==
=== Golden and Silver Age versions ===
Although a "passing motorist" is described as having found the infant Kal-El in the character's first appearance in 1938's Action Comics #1, 1939's Superman #1 introduces Superman's adoptive parents to the mythos, with "Mary Kent" being the only parent given a name. The Kents' first names vary in stories from the 1940s. A 1942 Superman novel, The Adventures of Superman by George Lowther, gave the names "Eben and Sarah Kent"; Eben and Martha Kent were used in the 1948 Superman film serial; while Eben and Sarah Kent were used in the 1952 première of Adventures of Superman television series, but the first extensive retelling of Superman's origin in Superman #53 (July–August 1948, billed as the "10th Anniversary Issue!") names them "John and Mary Kent". This issue firmly establishes that it is the Kents who discover the infant Kal-El. The Kents take him to a "home for foundlings" and express an interest in adopting him, to which the home readily agrees after suffering the disruption of the infant's growing abilities. This story also establishes that "Clark" is Mary Kent's maiden name. Mary and John Kent die of natural causes as "Clark grew to manhood", with John on his deathbed imploring Clark to become "a powerful force for good" and suggesting that Clark is a "superman", a name adopted by Clark in the story's final panel.

Pa Kent is first named Jonathan in Adventure Comics v1 #149 (Feb 1950). Ma Kent is first named Marthe in Superboy v1 #12 (Jan-Feb 1951) and Martha in subsequent appearances. Her full name is given as Martha Hudson Clark Kent in answer to a letter writer's query in Superman v1 #148 (Oct 1961). Later stories, after the early 1960s introduction of DC's Multiverse system, declare that the early version of the Kents are named "John and Mary Kent" and live on the world of "Earth-Two", home of the Golden Age DC superheroes, while the more modern Jonathan and Martha Kent live on the world of "Earth-One", home of the Silver Age DC superheroes.

Martha and Jonathan Kent, as they appear in comics from the 1970s and 1980s. From New Adventures of Superboy #1 (January 1980). Art by Kurt Schaffenberger.

The Kents made few appearances in Superman stories until the introduction of the Superboy comic book series in 1949. In this series, they are regular supporting characters of the teenage superhero. The Superboy stories establish the Kents' backstory. Jonathan, a former race car driver, is a farmer on a farm just outside Smallville. After he and Martha find the toddler Kal-El in his rocket, they take him to the Smallville Orphanage and later formally adopt him, naming him "Clark". They soon discover that Clark possesses a fantastic array of superpowers. Around the time Clark starts school, the Kents sell their farm, and the family moves into Smallville, where they open a general store. During Clark's early grade school years, Jonathan trains young Clark in the use of his superpowers to the best of his knowledge while urging him to keep the use of his powers a secret. At the age of eight, Clark begins a superhero career as Superboy. Martha creates Superboy's costume out of the blankets inside the rocket that brought him to Earth, and Jonathan helps him to create a means of making Superboy and Clark appear to be different people by developing Clark's secret identity as a mild-mannered, reserved individual. The Kents assist their adopted son on many adventures as Superboy.

After Clark graduates from high school, Jonathan and Martha take a vacation to the Caribbean Islands, where they contract a fatal tropical disease after handling materials from a pirate's treasure chest they had exhumed; despite Superboy's best efforts, Martha dies, with Jonathan dying soon thereafter. Before dying, Jonathan tells Clark to use his powers for the benefit of humanity. Clark mourns his parents and moves to Metropolis to attend college.

=== Modern Age versions ===
==== The Man of Steel ====
Jonathan and Martha Kent in Action Comics #597 (February 1988). Art by John Byrne.

Comics writer John Byrne rewrote Superman's origin in the 1986 The Man of Steel limited series. In this version, Clark Kent does not become Superman until he is an adult, erasing his time as Superboy from continuity. Additionally, Jonathan and Martha Kent survive into Clark's adulthood. The Kents have the same role as in the earlier stories, instilling within Clark the morals needed to become a strong and heroic figure. A Legion of Super-Heroes/Superman team-up that was written to explain why the Legion still exists even without Superboy confirms that post-Crisis Jonathan and Martha Kent are younger than their pre-Crisis counterparts, explaining in part why they live on in Clark's adult life.

In this version of events, after a Kryptonian "birthing matrix" lands on Earth, Jonathan and Martha find a newborn infant inside. Taking the infant in just before a major snowstorm strikes, the couple decides to pass the infant off as their biological child, naming him "Clark", exploiting Martha's past miscarriages to justify their decision to keep their 'latest pregnancy' a secret. Clark's powers slowly develop, with his powers fully emerging once he reaches his late teens. After Clark's high school graduation, the Kents tell Clark about his true origins, and Clark leaves Smallville to explore the outside world. After Clark moves to Metropolis, Jonathan and Martha help Clark to create a superhero identity. They are later present when Clark finally discovers a holographic message in his ship from his biological father, Jor-El; prior to this, the Kents had assumed that the ship was from another country's space program.

The Kents' post-Crisis history is fleshed out in the 1980s limited series The World of Smallville, with Jonathan's ancestors' history more fully explored in the 1990s limited series The Kents. The Kents reveals that the Kent family were resolute abolitionists who moved to Kansas to participate in the fight to establish it as a Free State during that region's violent pre-American Civil War period known as Bleeding Kansas.

When the Matrix Supergirl arrives on earth, she moves in for a time with the Kents, who treat her a like a daughter despite such issues as her relationship with Lex Luthor and her own guilt about 'subverting' the life of Linda Danvers when Matrix unwittingly merged with Linda. After Supergirl revealed that part of her life to the Kents, Jonathan visited the Danvers to help Linda's father Fred adapt to their mutual daughter's unconventional status.

The Kents later take in Superman's clone Kon-El, also known as Superboy. They give him the name Conner Kent and care for him in much the same was as they did Clark. However, Conner is not Clark, and while he appreciates everything the Kents did, he does not much like living on a farm. The couple find themselves childless again when Conner dies during Infinite Crisis.

==== Birthright ====
The younger version of the Kents as depicted in Superman: Birthright. Art by Leinil Francis Yu.

The Kents were again altered in 2003's Superman: Birthright limited series by Mark Waid, which again revised Superman's origins. Jonathan is portrayed as having a more strained relationship with his son, mainly due to Jonathan's childhood experiences with his overbearing father, and he and Martha are depicted as far younger at the time of Clark adopting his Superman identity than in past portrayals, appearing here to be scarcely middle-aged.

The Kents' appearances were altered to resemble the younger versions of John Schneider and Annette O'Toole, who portray the Kents in Smallville. Although now shown wearing glasses, Jonathan has a full head of blond hair, and Martha has long red tresses. This younger portrayal of the Kents has persisted in the regular DC Universe since Birthright was published.

Jonathan and Martha Kent with Clark Kent on the cover of Superman: Secret Origin #1 (Nov. 2009) art by Gary Frank.

==== After Birthright ====
After the "Infinite Crisis" storyline, Superman's continuity was revised yet again from the Birthright origin. Unlike Birthright, Jonathan is shown to have an equal standing as Martha in helping Clark create his heroic identity. Martha and Jonathan are the ones who suggest Clark dons a superhero costume, which initially Clark is not fond of. When Clark feels different from native Earth children, Martha relates with a story of her own family coming to terms in America, having emigrated from Germany long ago. In this version, the Kents are both shown to already have graying hair when they find the baby Kal-El, but are still drawn to be considerably younger, more in-tune to their Birthright counterparts; as the miniseries progresses into Clark's adulthood and debut as Superman, they visibly age and their appearances come to match those in The Man of Steel.

At the conclusion of the "Brainiac" story arc, Jonathan suffers a fatal heart attack during Brainiac's attack on Earth's sun. His funeral, attended by all his family and friends from Smallville, is shown in the Superman: New Krypton Special in which Martha, refusing to be a hindrance for their son, asks Clark to leave her alone at the farm and go attend the more pressing matter of Kandor's restoration and transformation in New Krypton. Despite her reassurances to Clark that she will be okay, Martha becomes lonely living alone on the Kent farm. Sensing that Martha needed a friend, and also feeling lonely without Clark, Krypto arrives on the front porch, offering Martha much needed companionship. Following the "Final Crisis" storyline, Conner Kent is resurrected and moves back in with Martha.

=== The New 52 ===
In The New 52 (a 2011 reboot of the DC Comics universe), Jonathan and Martha Kent were killed following an incident with a drunk driver and Clark Kent has to grow into his role as Superman without them.

=== DC Rebirth ===
In Doomsday Clock, it is revealed that Doctor Manhattan caused The New 52 reboot, facilitating the Kents' deaths. They are resurrected when Superman convinces Manhattan to undo his changes to the timeline.

== Other versions ==
- The Kent's Earth-Three counterparts appear briefly in the 2013–2014 "Forever Evil" storyline as part of Ultraman's origin. Young Jonathan and Martha Kent of Earth-Three are drug addicts in an abusive relationship. One day, while Jonathan is threatening Martha with a knife, Ultraman's space pod crash lands on their farm. Young Ultraman decides to blend into society until he is ready to conquer the planet, and forces Jonathan and Martha to act as his parents. It is revealed that sometime around the age of seven, Ultraman murders the Kents and burns down their farm, but keeps the name Clark Kent.
- In Superman: Earth One universe, Jonathan and Martha find the Kryptonian pod while hiking.
- In Absolute Superman, Krypton was not destroyed until Kal-El was a teenager. Seventeen months after the destruction of Krypton, Kal-El crash-lands on the Kent farm. The Kents take him in for a short time before he is captured by the Peacemakers for being an illegal immigrant. Six years later, Jonathan has died and Martha is in assisted living, having developed dementia. Kal goes to visit her many times, but she is unable to recognize him. After defending Smallville from the forces of the Lazarus Corporation, Kal goes to visit Martha once more, but is told she has died.

== In other media ==
=== Television ===
==== Animation ====
- Jonathan Kent appears in the Superboy segments of The New Adventures of Superman.
- Jonathan and Martha Kent appear in Superman (1988), voiced by Alan Oppenheimer and Tress MacNeille respectively.
- Jonathan and Martha Kent appear in series set in the DC Animated Universe (DCAU), voiced by real-life married couple Shelley Fabares and Mike Farrell respectively. Introduced in Superman: The Animated Series, the Kents also appear in Justice League.
- Martha Kent appears in Legion of Super Heroes, voiced by Jennifer Hale. Additionally, Jonathan appears in a photograph depicted in the episode "Fear Factory".
- Jonathan and Martha Kent appear in Young Justice, voiced by Mark Rolston and Zehra Fazal respectively.
- Martha Kent appears in the Super Best Friends Forever episode "Grounded" (as part of DC Nation Shorts).
- Jonathan and Martha Kent appear in DC Super Hero Girls, voiced by Dean Cain and Helen Slater respectively.
- Jonathan Kent makes a cameo appearance in the Justice League Action episode "Harley Goes Ape!", voiced by an uncredited actor.
- Jonathan and Martha Kent appear in the Teen Titans Go! episode "Orangins".
- Jonathan and Martha Kent appear in My Adventures with Superman, voiced by Reid Scott and Kari Wahlgren respectively. Unlike other versions, Jonathan is alive and in good health.

==== Live-action ====
- Eben and Sarah Kent appear in Adventures of Superman (1952), portrayed by Tom Fadden and Frances Morris. After Eben dies of a heart attack, Sarah makes the Superman costume for Clark to bring to Metropolis.
- Jonathan and Martha Kent appear in It's a Bird... It's a Plane... It's Superman!, portrayed by George Chandler and Irene Tedrow.
- Jonathan and Martha Kent appear in Superboy, portrayed by Stuart Whitman and Salome Jens.
- Jonathan and Martha Kent appear in Lois & Clark: The New Adventures of Superman, portrayed by Eddie Jones and K Callan respectively.
- Jonathan and Martha Kent appear in Smallville, portrayed by John Schneider and Annette O'Toole respectively. This version of the Kents are in their early 40s at the start of the series. Jonathan runs for and wins as Senator against Lex Luthor. At the night of the election, he dies of a heart attack. Martha becomes a Senator herself afterwards, working to protect Clark against Amanda Waller under the alias of Red Queen. She eventually marries Perry White.
- Martha Kent appears in a flashback in the Titans episode "Conner", portrayed by Sarah Deakins.
- Jonathan and Martha Kent appear in Superman & Lois, portrayed by Fred Henderson and Michele Scarabelli respectively. Jonathan died of a heart attack while Clark was still a teenager, which Clark mentions to have influenced his decision to leave Smallville after he graduated. Martha continued to provide guidance to Clark as he became Superman and eventually a father to his own twin sons with Lois, Jonathan and Jordan. In the pilot episode, after Martha dies of a stroke, Clark and Lois learn from Lana Lang that Martha had a reverse mortgage on the farm to help with her neighbors' financial troubles, and to raise college funding for the twins, leading the couple to decide to purchase the Kent farm and move their family there.

=== Film ===
==== Animation ====
- Martha Kent appears in Superman: Doomsday, voiced by Swoosie Kurtz. In this film, Jonathan has been dead for many years.
- Jonathan and Martha Kent make a non-speaking appearance in Superman/Batman: Apocalypse.
- Martha Kent appears in All-Star Superman, voiced by Frances Conroy.
- Martha Kent appears in Superman: Unbound, voiced again by Frances Conroy.
- Jonathan and Martha Kent appear in Superman: Brainiac Attacks, voiced again by Mike Farrell and Shelley Fabares respectively.
- Jonathan and Martha Kent appear in Superman vs. The Elite, with Jonathan voiced by Paul Eiding while Martha appears briefly with no dialogue.
- Jonathan and Martha Kent make non-speaking cameo appearances in Justice League: The Flashpoint Paradox.
- Jonathan and Martha Kent appear in JLA Adventures: Trapped in Time, voiced by Tom Gibis and Erica Luttrell respectively.
- Jonathan and Martha Kent appear in DC Super Hero Girls: Hero of the Year, voiced by Dean Cain and Helen Slater respectively.
- Jonathan and Martha Kent appear in the DC Animated Movie Universe films The Death of Superman (2018) and Reign of the Supermen, voiced again by Paul Eiding and Jennifer Hale respectively.
- Jonathan and Martha Kent appear in Superman: Man of Tomorrow (2020), voiced by Neil Flynn and Bellamy Young respectively.
- Jonathan Kent appears in Injustice, voiced by Kevin Pollak. This version is a widower and is kidnapped by Mirror Master on behalf of the U.S. government, to be used as leverage against Superman. After Superman rescues Jonathan, he brings him to the Fortress of Solitude for his own protection, where Jonathan is later accidentally killed by one of Green Arrow's arrows that was deflected by Superman.

==== Live-action ====
- Eben and Martha Kent appear in the Superman serial, portrayed by Edward Cassidy and Virginia Carroll.

Glenn Ford as Jonathan Kent with Phyllis Thaxter as Martha in Superman (1978).

- Jonathan and Martha Kent appear in Superman (1978), portrayed by Glenn Ford and Phyllis Thaxter. This version of Jonathan dies of a heart attack shortly after giving Clark guidance of his purpose on Earth, which inspires him to create the Fortress of Solitude and later to defy Jor-El's warnings by reversing time to prevent Lois Lane's death. Martha is indicated by Lana Lang to have died in Superman III (1983), and Clark sells the farm in the beginning of Superman IV: The Quest for Peace (1987).
- Martha Kent appears in Superman Returns (2006), portrayed by Eva Marie Saint. Jonathan Kent also appears in photographs.

==== DC Extended Universe ====
- Jonathan and Martha Kent appear in the DC Extended Universe, portrayed by Kevin Costner and Diane Lane and first appearing in the 2013 film Man of Steel. This version of Jonathan is a Vietnam War veteran who insists on Clark keeping his powers secret and opposes his desire to go out into the world, while Martha consoles Clark as his powers threaten to overwhelm him. Ultimately, Jonathan is killed in a tornado after refusing to let Clark use his powers to save him. Years later, Martha is taken hostage by General Zod's forces, who demand the location of the spacecraft that brought Clark to Earth, and is saved only by the timely intervention of her son.
- In Batman v Superman: Dawn of Justice, Lex Luthor has Martha kidnapped and held hostage by Anatoli Knyazev to force Superman to fight Batman. Superman convinces Batman to join forces against Luthor, and Batman rescues Martha. After Doomsday kills Superman, he is buried next to Jonathan.
- In Justice League, Martha sells the Kent farm, as she cannot afford bank fees and no longer has an attachment to Smallville following her son's death and is always accompanied by Lois Lane. When Superman is resurrected, she joyously reunites with him, and Bruce Wayne buys the bank Martha owed money to, allowing her to keep the farm. In Zack Snyder's Justice League, Martian Manhunter disguises himself as Martha to convince Lois Lane to re-enter society.

==== DC Universe ====
- Jonathan and Martha Kent appear in the DC Universe film Superman (2025), portrayed by Pruitt Taylor Vince and Neva Howell respectively. In contrast to previous appearances, Jonathan never died during Clark's youth, and he remains alive well into his Superman years. In the 1990s, Jonathan and Martha found the infant Kal-El in a Kryptonian space pod and adopted him, naming him Clark Kent. They gave Clark a happy childhood and moral guidance, inspiring him to use his Kryptonian powers to become a superhero. In the present day—after the world had turned against Superman caused by Lex Luthor, Jonathan and Martha take Clark and Krypto in, with Lois Lane's help, so he can recover. After discussing his troubled relationship with the world, Jonathan and Martha encourage Clark; he then witnesses Boravia’s invasion of Jarhanpur—a place where Superman is truly needed—before clearing his name with the help of Lois and Daily Planet.
- Howell as Martha Kent will appear in the film Man of Tomorrow (2027).

=== Video games ===
- Jonathan and Martha Kent appear in DC Universe Online, voiced by Brandon Young and Diane Perella respectively.
- Jonathan and Martha Kent appear as character summons in Scribblenauts Unmasked: A DC Comics Adventure.

=== Miscellaneous ===
- Jonathan and Martha Kent appear in the Injustice: Gods Among Us prequel comic. The President of the United States hires Mirror Master and a team of commandos to kidnap the Kents, intending to use them as bargaining chips in an attempt to end Superman's enforced peacekeeping. Superman and the Justice League rescue the Kents, who are brought to the Fortress of Solitude for their protection. When the Insurgency breaks into the Fortress, Green Arrow accidentally hits Jonathan in the shoulder with one of his arrows while trying to combat Superman. In response, Superman beats Green Arrow to death. The Kents try to talk Superman down, just like the hologram of Jor-El, who appears and agrees with the Kents that Clark has gone too far, but he refuses to listen to them and leaves. The Kents apologize to Jor-El, as they believe they failed to raise his son properly; Jor-El in turn apologizes for sending Kal-El to Earth.
