= Man of Tomorrow (film) =

Upcoming DC Studios film by James Gunn

- Directed by: James Gunn
- Written by: James Gunn
- Based on: Characters from DC
- Produced by: Peter Safran; James Gunn
- Starring: David Corenswet; Nicholas Hoult; Rachel Brosnahan; Edi Gathegi; Nathan Fillion; Isabela Merced; Skyler Gisondo; Frank Grillo; Sara Sampaio; María Gabriela de Faría; Lars Eidinger; Aaron Pierre; Milly Alcock; Xolo Maridueña
- Cinematography: Sam McCurdy
- Edited by: Fred Raskin
- Music by: David Fleming
- Production companies: DC Studios; Troll Court Entertainment; The Safran Company
- Distributed by: Warner Bros. Pictures
- Release date: July 9, 2027
- Country: United States
- Language: English

Man of Tomorrow is an upcoming American superhero film featuring the DC Comics characters Superman and Lex Luthor. Written and directed by James Gunn, it will be the fourth film in the DC Universe (DCU) and a follow-up to Superman (2025). David Corenswet and Nicholas Hoult reprise their roles as Clark Kent / Superman and Lex Luthor, respectively, alongside Rachel Brosnahan, Edi Gathegi, Nathan Fillion, Isabela Merced, Skyler Gisondo, Frank Grillo, María Gabriela de Faría, Sara Sampaio, and Milly Alcock, with Lars Eidinger, Aaron Pierre, and Xolo Maridueña joining the cast. In the film, Superman and Luthor reluctantly team up to face a bigger threat: the superintelligent Brainiac (Eidinger). It is produced by Gunn and Peter Safran of DC Studios.

Gunn revealed in June 2025 that he was working on a follow-up to the first DCU film, Superman, ahead of its release the following month. The title and first details were revealed in September, and Eidinger was cast as Brainiac in December. Leading up to the start of production, additional DCU actors were revealed to be reprising their roles. Filming took place from April to August 2026, primarily at Trilith Studios in Atlanta, Georgia, as well as in the United Kingdom and Cincinnati, Ohio.

Man of Tomorrow is scheduled to be released by Warner Bros. Pictures in the United States on July 9, 2027. It will be part of the DCU's Chapter One: Gods and Monsters.

== Premise ==
Two years after the events of Superman (2025), Superman and Lex Luthor reluctantly team up to face a bigger threat: the superintelligent alien android Brainiac.

== Cast ==
- David Corenswet as Kal-El / Clark Kent / Superman:
  A survivor from the destroyed planet Krypton who lives on Earth as a powerful superhero. He maintains a separate identity at his day job, working as a journalist for the Daily Planet in Metropolis.
- Nicholas Hoult as Lex Luthor:
  The former CEO of LuthorCorp and Superman's arch-nemesis who is incarcerated in Van Kull Prison. After exploring "a lot about the evil part of Lex" in the DC Universe (DCU) film Superman (2025), writer and director James Gunn was interested in "getting into the heart of Lex, and... getting to know Lex as more of a human being". He admired the character's tenacity and ambition, particularly as a human with no superpowers who chooses to challenge a powerful alien. The film features Luthor's high-tech powered exoskeleton Warsuit, which he uses to match Superman's strength, for the first time in a live-action film.
- Rachel Brosnahan as Lois Lane: A reporter for the Daily Planet who is Clark's girlfriend and colleague
- Edi Gathegi as Michael Holt / Mister Terrific: A superhero and inventor who uses a variety of high-tech gadgets to fight crime, and is a member of the Justice Gang sponsored by Maxwell Lord
- Nathan Fillion as Guy Gardner / Green Lantern:
  An abrasive galactic peacekeeper in the Green Lantern Corps, and a Justice Gang member. Fillion said the character's hairstyle was updated for Man of Tomorrow after he wore the same bowl cut wig for both Superman and the television series Lanterns (2026–present).
- Isabela Merced as Kendra Saunders / Hawkgirl:
  A superhero with wings and various melee weapons who is a Justice Gang member. She is reincarnated from an alien, retaining her memories and past trauma with a grumpy demeanor.
- Skyler Gisondo as Jimmy Olsen: A boyish young photographer who is Clark and Lois's closest colleague
- Frank Grillo as Rick Flag Sr.: The director of A.R.G.U.S.
- Sara Sampaio as Eve Teschmacher: Luthor's former assistant and girlfriend who is secretly involved with Jimmy
- María Gabriela de Faría as Angela Spica / The Engineer: An ally of Luthor whose abilities come from nanotechnology in her body
- Lars Eidinger as Brainiac:
  A superintelligent alien android from the planet Colu. Eidinger characterized Brainiac as "the incarnation of Satan" and the Shakespearean fool, contrasting him with Superman as the Übermensch. Gunn further contrasted Brainiac with Superman as "what happens when intelligence loses all connection to humanity". Gunn added that he had read most comic book storylines featuring Brainiac and incorporated aspects from various iterations of the character that he felt worked for this interpretation, drawing particular inspiration from the original version created by writer Otto Binder in the 1950s, the "surprisingly scary" version by writer Marv Wolfman, animated adaptations, and the "truly creepy and wonderful" artificial intelligence (AI) version from the Absolute Universe.
- Aaron Pierre as John Stewart: A former Green Lantern recruit who operates independently with his own power ring, inherited from his deceased mentor, the Green Lantern Hal Jordan
- Milly Alcock as Kara Zor-El / Supergirl:
  The cousin of Superman who was raised on a chunk of the destroyed planet Krypton and watched everyone around her die, making her a more jaded person than her cousin, who was raised on Earth by loving parents. DC Studios executive Lars P. Winther said that Supergirl is now spending more time with her cousin on Earth following her "wild ways" in her intergalactic-set film, Supergirl (2026).
- Xolo Maridueña as Jaime Reyes / Blue Beetle:
  A college graduate bonded to an alien Scarab that forms a powerful exoskeleton around his body. Maridueña reprises his role from the DC Extended Universe (DCEU) film Blue Beetle (2023).

Additional actors reprising their DCU roles in the film include Neva Howell as Martha Kent, Clark's adoptive human mother; and Stephen Blackehart as Sydney Happersen, a LuthorCorp scientist. Adria Arjona has been cast in an undisclosed role, reported to be Maxima, the warrior-queen of the planet Almerac who believes Superman is her suitable mate. Other actors cast in undisclosed roles are Andre Royo, Matthew Lillard, and Sinqua Walls. The superhero Wonder Woman is expected to debut in the film.

== Production ==
=== Development ===
In June 2025, ahead of the release of the first DC Universe (DCU) film Superman, writer and director James Gunn—who also produced the film with his DC Studios co-chair and co-CEO Peter Safran—said he was working on the script for a follow-up film that would not be a direct sequel, but would feature Clark Kent / Superman in a major role. Gunn stated that it would not be called Superman 2, and it would not be a World's Finest or Batman vs. Superman film featuring a team-up between Superman and Batman. Superman stars David Corenswet (Superman) and Rachel Brosnahan (Lois Lane) had options for a potential sequel in their contracts, but following the first film's release in July a direct sequel was not expected to be announced in the near future. In August, Warner Bros. Discovery CEO David Zaslav announced that Gunn would also direct the follow-up film, and described it as the "next movie in the 'Super-Family'". Gunn said it was the "next story in what I'll call the 'Superman Saga'". He had finished writing a detailed treatment, similar to the "60-page treatments with dialogue and everything" that he wrote for his previous films, and had started turning that into a full script. Gunn added that DC Studios was actively scheduling the film's production and it would begin filming "sooner rather than later".

Gunn, Corenswet, and Nicholas Hoult—who portrayed Lex Luthor in Superman—each posted a piece of artwork to social media in September 2025, announcing that the follow-up was titled Man of Tomorrow and was scheduled for release on July 9, 2027. Corenswet and Hoult were expected to reprise their roles. The pieces all feature Superman and Luthor, the latter in his armored suit from the comics, and were respectively drawn by DC Comics artists Jim Lee, Jorge Jiménez, and Mitch Gerads. Commentators believed the artwork indicated that the two characters would team up or have a rematch in the film. Gunn said he had finished a draft of the script and was rewriting it, and that Lois Lane would have an important role. He soon added that filming was scheduled to start around April 2026, and explained that they were able to move so quickly because they "knew immediately where we were going" with the story. He said Man of Tomorrow was "as much a Lex movie as it is a Superman movie" and would include the pair working together against a bigger threat. In late September, Gunn released a picture of the completed second script draft. The cover features an anatomical illustration of a brain, leading to speculation that the comic book villain Brainiac would be in the film. Gunn previously considered using Brainiac in Superman.

Upon the announcement of Man of Tomorrow, Gunn stated that the second season of his television series Peacemaker (2025) was a "prequel" to Man of Tomorrow that directly sets-up the film's events; Hoult makes a cameo appearance as Luthor in the Peacemaker episode "Ignorance Is Chris", in which A.R.G.U.S. leader Rick Flag Sr. (Frank Grillo) offers Luthor "an opportunity for redemption". Gunn said this was an important moment for the entire DCU. He added that Man of Tomorrow is set in "real time" after Superman, roughly occurring in mid-2027. The Peacemaker season 2 finale "Full Nelson" introduces the organization Checkmate and the inter-dimensional prison Salvation. These were two important aspects of Gunn's overarching DCU story that he had planned out before being hired as co-head of DC Studios, with the series Lanterns (2026–present) also touching on both story points, and Salvation being a major aspect of Man of Tomorrow.

=== Pre-production ===
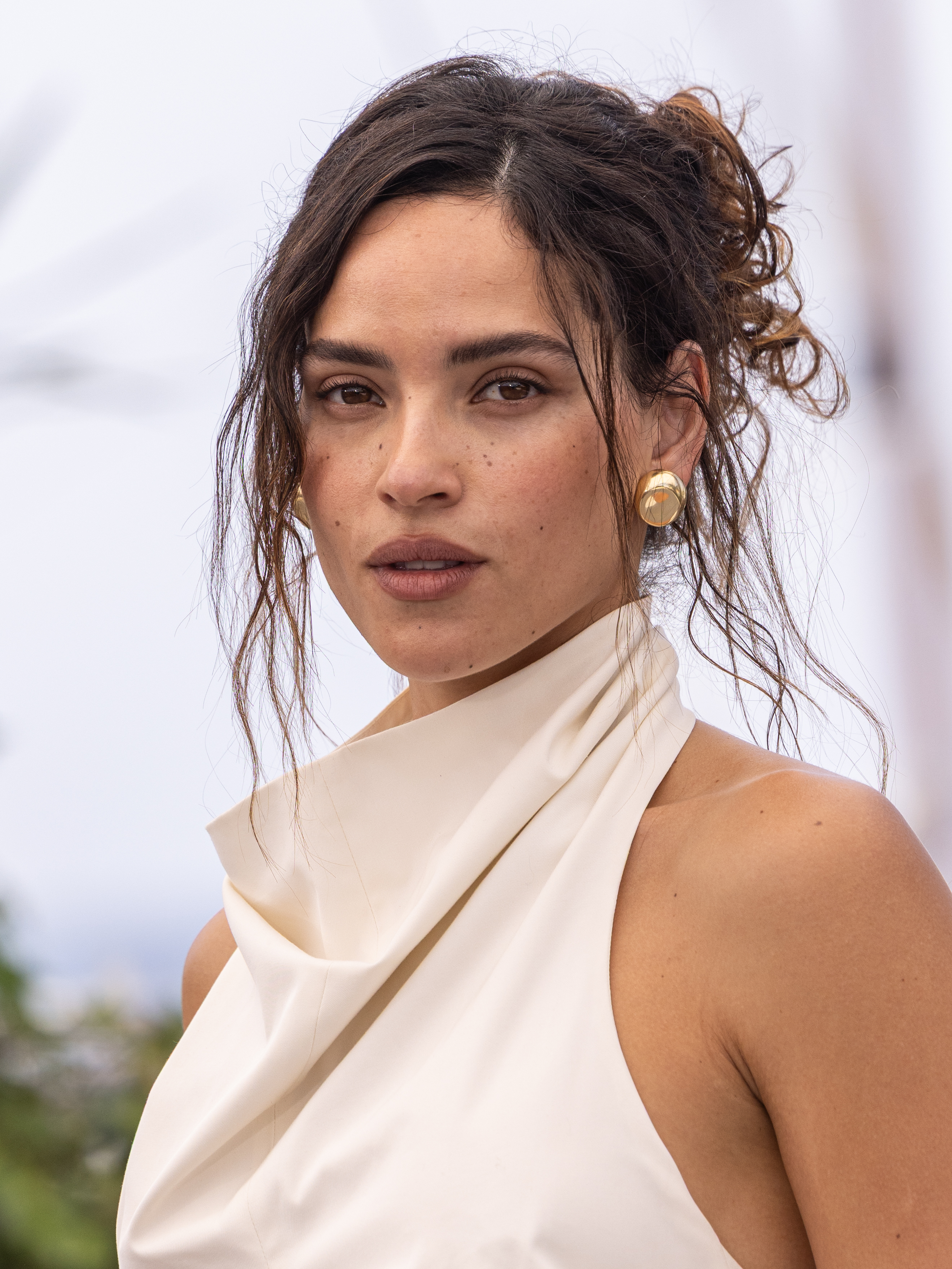
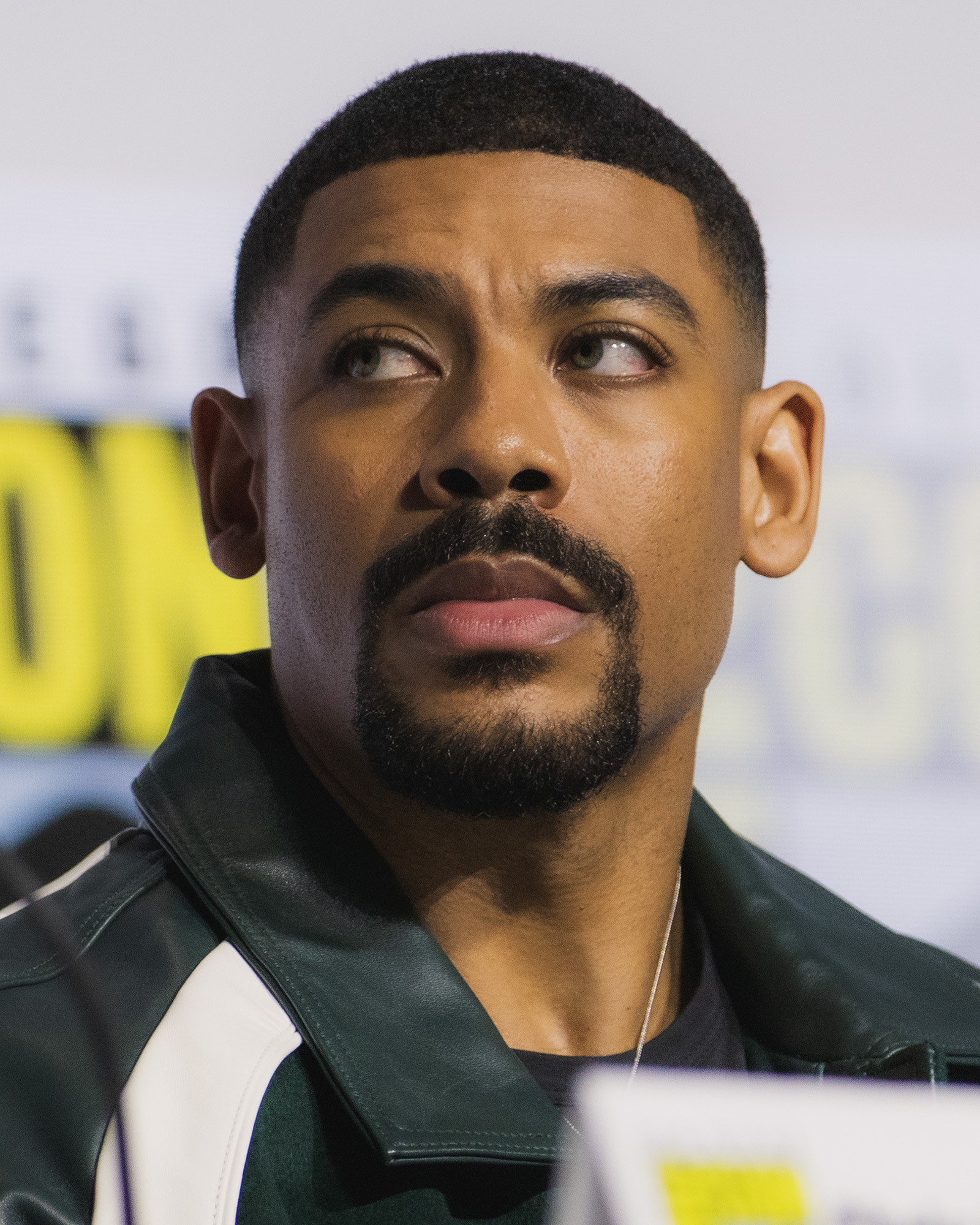
New cast members joining the DCU for Man of Tomorrow include Lars Eidinger (top left) as the film's antagonist Brainiac; Xolo Maridueña (top right) as the superhero Jaime Reyes / Blue Beetle from the DC Extended Universe (DCEU); and Adria Arjona (bottom left), reportedly as Maxima, while Aaron Pierre (bottom right) returns as the Green Lantern John Stewart from the DCU television series Lanterns (2026)

In November 2025, Grillo confirmed that he was preparing to return as Flag for a major role in Man of Tomorrow. Brainiac was confirmed to appear as the main antagonist, while Gunn was storyboarding the film. Lars Eidinger was cast as Brainiac in late December, after a "worldwide search" from which Eidinger emerged as the frontrunner. Eidinger was approached by Gunn over Zoom about submitting a self-tape for the role, which the actor said they became "obsessed" with, before an in-person audition with Gunn in Atlanta, Georgia. Eidinger underwent a 3D modeling scan of his body and spent two hours getting the character's makeup applied and mask designed. He also watched Superman to prepare for the audition. In January 2026, Gunn said that casting was underway for smaller roles and a prominent female character, but debunked speculation that this was for Wonder Woman. He added that Eidinger's casting was the film's most important new addition, and that the other supporting roles were characters previously introduced in earlier DCU projects. The following month, the Ohio Department of Development revealed that Man of Tomorrow would be partially filmed in Cincinnati, Ohio. The production received nearly $2 million through the state's tax credit program, after Superman was also filmed there. A practical, mobile version of Luthor's high-tech Warsuit was designed by Judianna Makovsky and Legacy Effects to be worn by Hoult during filming. Commentators noted the Warsuit's comics-accurate design, which features more green than purple and is slightly bulkier.

Leading up to the start of production in the following months, several Superman actors were revealed to be reprising their DCU roles for Man of Tomorrow, including Isabela Merced as Kendra Saunders / Hawkgirl, Brosnahan as Lane, Skyler Gisondo as Jimmy Olsen, Sara Sampaio as Eve Teschmacher, María Gabriela de Faría as Angela Spica / The Engineer, Edi Gathegi as Michael Holt / Mister Terrific, and Nathan Fillion as Guy Gardner / Green Lantern. In March, Aaron Pierre was revealed to be reprising his role of the Green Lantern John Stewart from Lanterns, and in early April, Adria Arjona, Eva De Dominici, Sydney Chandler, and Grace Van Patten performed screen tests in Atlanta for the role of Maxima, for which they were the finalists. Arjona previously starred in the film The Belko Experiment (2016), which Gunn produced. Deadline Hollywood initially reported that Arjona, Marisa Abela, and Ella Purnell were testing for Maxima, before Gunn refuted that. He stated that the production had one major role left to cast, but would not confirm whether this was Maxima. Journalist Jeff Sneider reaffirmed that the four finalists had tested for Maxima, reporting that she would have a small role in the film before having a larger role in an eventual third Superman film. He questioned whether some of the actresses were testing for another role, such as Wonder Woman.

After several screen tests throughout April, the studio cast Arjona later that month. Angelique Jackson at Variety acknowledged that Arjona had been suggested for the role of Wonder Woman by some fans, which Gunn had agreed with, but reported along with Deadline that Arjona was cast as Maxima. However, Borys Kit and Aaron Couch of The Hollywood Reporter and Umberto Gonzalez at TheWrap reported that it was unclear whether she would portray Maxima. Gonzalez acknowledged speculation of the film adapting aspects of the 1992 comic book storyline "Panic in the Sky", in which Superman and other superheroes fight Brainiac as he attempts to invade Earth, working with Maxima before she betrays him; Gunn previously said he was not specifically inspired by that storyline. Later in April, Gunn announced that Andre Royo, who starred in his film Super (2010), had been cast in the film for an undisclosed role. This prompted speculation that Royo would portray the character Martian Manhunter, who was briefly referenced in Superman. Gunn also revealed that Stephen Blackehart was reprising his DCU role as Sydney Happersen in the film.

=== Filming ===
Principal photography commenced on April 20, 2026, taking place primarily at Trilith Studios in Fayetteville, Georgia, under the working title Exodus. Sam McCurdy was the cinematographer, after previously working with Gunn on Peacemaker. During the first week of filming, some scenes were shot in parts of the Federal Correctional Institution, Atlanta, which caused minimal disruption to the prison's operations. In early May, Matthew Lillard and Sinqua Walls joined the cast in undisclosed roles. Lillard previously expressed interest in joining the DCU and starred as Shaggy Rogers in the films Scooby-Doo (2002) and Scooby-Doo 2: Monsters Unleashed (2004), which Gunn wrote. Later that month, Milly Alcock was revealed to be reprising her role as Kara Zor-El / Supergirl, while Neva Howell announced in June that she would return as Clark's adoptive human mother, Martha Kent. Five days of filming was scheduled to take place in Cincinnati, Ohio, between June 15 and August 21, with filming also set to occur at Terminal Station in Macon, Georgia, to stand-in for the Daily Planet newsroom, as well as in Atlanta, Georgia, and the United Kingdom. Grillo was set to shoot his scenes for ten weeks between the UK and Georgia, with Eidinger filming his scenes from May until the end of August.

Filming was halfway completed by the end of June 2026, at which point DC Studios executive Lars P. Winther stated that Paramount Skydance CEO David Ellison had visited the set during filming in anticipation of the acquisition of Warner Bros. Discovery by Paramount Skydance, adding that Ellison was interested in and supportive of the studio's DC plans. In mid-July, Xolo Maridueña was revealed to be reprising his role of Jaime Reyes / Blue Beetle from the film Blue Beetle (2023), part of the DCU's predecessor, the DC Extended Universe (DCEU). The film was set to reintroduce the character into the DCU; Gunn previously called Maridueña's Blue Beetle "the first DCU character". Gunn said later that month that his friend Rick Devens was slated to have a background cameo appearance but was unable to due to scheduling conflicts with his role in the twenty-eighth season of the American reality series Big Brother. Gunn announced on August 26 that filming had wrapped, having lasted approximately 93 days over the course of four months.

=== Post-production ===
In October 2026, Gunn announced the assembly cut was complete and denied further speculation that Arjona was portraying Wonder Woman. After Skydance and Ellison ousted Gunn and Safran from DC Studios early the following month, Ben Fritz at The Wall Street Journal reported that Wonder Woman would debut in Man of Tomorrow. Later that week, Gunn stated that Skydance had yet to be shown a cut of the film and refuted subsequent rumors that had circulated online regarding "sweeping changes" that Skydance would make to the film, such as potential reshoots to remove appearances from Supergirl, Blue Beetle, and Wonder Woman. Visual effects supervisor Stéphane Ceretti returns from Superman and some of Gunn's prior films, while Fred Raskin serves as the editor.

== Music ==
In December 2025, Gunn said he had selected various licensed songs to be featured in Man of Tomorrow. He confirmed in April 2026 that David Fleming would return from Superman to compose the score.

== Release ==
Man of Tomorrow is scheduled to be released theatrically by Warner Bros. Pictures in the United States on July 9, 2027. The film is expected to be released in IMAX. It will be part of the DCU's Chapter One: Gods and Monsters.

== Future ==
Following the ousting of Gunn and Safran from DC Studios in November 2026, Gunn was reported to have been in the middle of writing a third Superman film that was planned to conclude a trilogy and release by 2029 while setting up planned Justice League films. At this point, Gunn and Safran had planned several films and television series featuring different DC superheroes into the 2030s, but it remained unclear whether their creative plans for the DCU would remain intact. Matthew Belloni from Puck News reported that many of the duo's future plans beyond Man of Tomorrow would be "dismantle[d]", with the franchise going "back into reboot mode".
