= Greedy People (film) =

American comedy mystery film

- Theatrical release poster
- Directed by: Potsy Ponciroli
- Written by: Michael Vukadinovich
- Produced by: David Boies; Zack Schiller; Shannon Houchins; Dylan Sellers; Chris Parker
- Starring: Himesh Patel; Lily James; Tim Blake Nelson; Uzo Aduba; Nina Arianda; Jim Gaffigan; Simon Rex; Joseph Gordon-Levitt
- Cinematography: Eric Koretz
- Edited by: Jamie Kirkpatrick
- Music by: Jordan Lehning
- Production companies: Limelight; Boies Schiller Entertainment; Hideout Pictures
- Distributed by: Lionsgate
- Release date: August 23, 2024
- Running time: 113 minutes
- Country: United States
- Language: English
- Box office: $182,369

Greedy People is a 2024 American crime comedy film directed by Potsy Ponciroli and written by Michael Vukadinovich. It follows the misadventures of several lives in a small coast town that end up entangled by a web of lies, which creates a domino effect of retaliatory murders all around greed. The film stars Himesh Patel, Lily James, Tim Blake Nelson, Uzo Aduba, Nina Arianda, Jim Gaffigan, Simon Rex and Joseph Gordon-Levitt.

The film had a limited theatrical release in the United States on August 23, 2024 and a streaming release the same day.

== Plot ==
=== "The Cops" ===
Rookie cop Will has recently moved with his pregnant wife Paige and is now partnered with chaotic and morally questionable local officer, Terry, in the small Southern seaside town of Providence.

While showing Will around on his first day, Terry leaves Will alone in the cruiser that afternoon to have sex with the Chinese wife of a local businessman, with whom he's having an affair. Will gets a call from dispatch, which he mistakes for a burglary, and is forced to go without Terry. Upon arriving at the location—a large, fancy house—he mistakenly fires at the occupant. She retaliates violently, and in the struggle, she is accidentally killed.

Terry arrives and finds Will distraught. The body is of Virginia Chetlo, wife to Wallace Chetlo, a local, powerful fishery owner. The two officers uncover a large basket of money in the living room. Knowing that Will will go to jail and Terry will lose his job for not being with Will if they tell the truth, the officers decide to cover up the accident and abscond with the money, which they lock up in an isolated container. They trash the home to make it seem like a robbery murder and make up an alibi by going on duty and giving civilians tickets. Though the officers promise not to tell anyone, Will tells Paige what happened, but—unable to admit his guilt—says that it was Terry who killed Virginia.

=== "The Masseur" ===
Keith is a naive and flamboyant man that works as a masseur, handyman, and sex assistant to Virginia Chetlo. He is upstairs when Will and Terry are trashing the living room to mess with the crime scene, sees Virginia's body, and escapes to his house on his bike. Will, who saw the bike upon entering the house, notes that it's gone.

After the two officers show up to question him the next day, it is revealed that his mom knows everything.

=== "The Husband" ===
Wallace Chetlo meets his secretary and mistress, Deborah, at work, and receives a call from 'The Colombian', one of the town's two hitmen, who Wallace had hired to kill Virginia so that he and Deborah could be together. The Colombian finds Virginia already dead and the money missing, so he threatens Wallace.

Paige invites Terry over for dinner to evaluate him, but Terry responds to her probing in a way that unsettles her. Terry accidentally hits and kills the couple's dog when backing out with his car, leaving Paige heartbroken.

=== "The Pregnant Wife" ===
Convinced Terry is a threat, Paige hires the other hitman in town, 'The Irishman', to kill him, and retrieves the money from the shipping container to pay the advance. The Irishman attacks Terry but his assassination attempt fails.

Wallace and Deborah go to Keith's house to ask about the missing money, but Keith's mom shoots Wallace dead, and Deborah opens fire; everyone but Deborah dies. The shooting is witnessed by Will, who returns home to find a wounded Terry waiting for him, livid. When the two cops find the money missing, Terry suspects Paige, revealing to Will that he knew the dinner invitation was a test and that he purposely killed their dog as a warning to Paige. Angered to learn that Paige tried to have him killed and that Will lied about who killed Virginia, Terry shoots Will dead and pursues Paige to get the money back, but is shot dead by his captain, Chief Murphy.

=== "The Child" ===
Paige wakes up in the hospital after giving birth, and attempts to flee with the money, but is killed by 'The Colombian', who takes the money. In the elevator, he is joined by Deborah, who attacks him for the money. Both end up dead. Chief Murphy adopts Paige and Will's child and says that while she will never know exactly what happened and why so many people ended up dead, she reminds herself to be hopeful.

== Cast ==
- Joseph Gordon-Levitt as Officer Terry Brogan
- Himesh Patel as Officer Will Shelley
- Lily James as Paige
- Tim Blake Nelson as Wallace Chetlo
- Traci Lords as Virginia Chetlo
- Joey Lauren Adams as Bobette
- Uzo Aduba as Murphy
- Jim Gaffigan as The Irishman
- Simon Rex as Keith Crawford
- Nina Arianda as Deborah
- Neva Howell as Ms. Crawford
- José María Yazpik as The Colombian
- Yingling Zhu as Yu Yan

== Production ==
The film was initially titled The Problem with Providence. In May 2022 it was announced that filming was starting, with Lily James, Joseph Gordon-Levitt and Himesh Patel appearing in the Limelight, Boies Schiller Entertainment and Hideout Pictures financed and produced film directed by Potsy Ponciroli and written by Michael Vukadinovich. Producers are David Boies, Zack Schiller, Shannon Houchins, Dylan Sellers and Chris Parker with executive producers Tyler Zacharia, Sam Slater, Phil Keefe and Dane Eckerle with Vukadinovich. On May 13, it was revealed that Tim Blake Nelson, Uzo Aduba, Simon Rex, Nina Arianda, Jim Gaffigan, José María Yazpik and Joey Lauren Adams had joined the cast. Filming took place in Southport, North Carolina, between May 9 and June 11, 2022. In October 2023, it was retitled Greedy People.

== Release ==
In February 2024, Lionsgate acquired domestic distribution rights to the film; its Indian division also acquired distribution rights for India and the Philippines from Mister Smith Entertainment. The film was released theatrically and on video-on-demand in the United States on August 23, 2024.

== Reception ==
On the review aggregator website Rotten Tomatoes, 61% of 44 critics' reviews are positive, with an average rating of 6/10. The website's consensus reads: "Joseph Gordon-Levitt plays a doofus with entertaining savvy in Greedy People, a shaggy crime comedy that welcomes unflattering comparisons to better examples of the genre." Metacritic, which uses a weighted average, assigned the film a score of 45 out of 100, based on 6 critics, indicating "mixed or average" reviews.
