= Back to the Suture =

- Peacemaker episode
- Episode no.: Season 2 Episode 5
- Directed by: Alethea Jones
- Written by: James Gunn
- Cinematography by: Scott Peck
- Editing by: Philip Fowler
- Original air date: September 18, 2025
- Running time: 36 minutes

Episode chronology
← Previous "Need I Say Door"	Next → "Ignorance Is Chris"
- Peacemaker season 2

"Back to the Suture" is the fifth episode of the second season of the American television series Peacemaker. It is the thirteenth overall episode of the series, and was written by series creator James Gunn and directed by Alethea Jones. It originally aired on HBO Max on September 18, 2025.

In the episode, Chris Smith / Peacemaker reaches out to his friend Emilia Harcourt, hoping to affirm her romantic reciprocation, but his subsequent capture by A.R.G.U.S. and a brutal interrogation by director Rick Flag Sr. forces him to make a pivotal decision. Meanwhile, bird hunter Red St. Wild attempts to kill Peacemaker's pet Eagly after tracking them to his cabin hideout.

The episode received mostly positive reviews from critics, who praised Cena and Grillo’s performances and emotional tone, but criticized the episode's pacing.

== Plot ==
Three years prior, Harcourt and Economos attend the funeral of Rick Flag Jr., with a devastated Rick Flag Sr. swearing to take action against his son's killer.

In the present day, Harcourt arrives at a park, with Flag Sr. and A.R.G.U.S. monitoring. Chris arrives and is aware of the operation, as Harcourt gave him a code word. Chris asks if she ever saw their relationship as anything to her, which she denies. As A.R.G.U.S. agents approach them, Chris attacks them. Before Sasha Bordeaux, revealed to be a cyborg, can shoot him, Harcourt knocks Chris unconscious to save his life. In custody, Flag Sr. brutally attacks and nearly kills Chris for his son's death. However, Economos books Chris's name in the system, saving Chris as his death in their custody could cause A.R.G.U.S. problems.

In the woods, Red St. Wild hunts Eagly, killing an eagle he mistakes for Eagly in the process. Eagly then appears with a horde of eagles, confirming St. Wild's belief that Eagly is the "Primal Eagle". The eagles brutally maul St. Wild to death. Chris returns to the cabin alone after saying goodbye to Leota Adebayo and Adrian, unaware that Judomaster has followed him, with the latter revealing the cabin's location to Flag Sr. and Fleury. Chris writes a letter for Adebayo to find and sends her a text to bid farewell, prompting her and Adrian to return to the cabin.

Using the device, Chris enters the Quantum Chamber. Judomaster follows Chris into the portal, leaving a note for A.R.G.U.S. before he does. Adebayo and Adrian arrive just as the rift closes and find Chris's letter. Adebayo reads it to Adrian, Economos, and Harcourt; in it, Chris states he cannot find redemption in their universe and will instead start a new life in the alternate universe with Eagly and the alternate Keith and Auggie. Harcourt takes the device and vows that they will bring Chris home. In the alternate universe, after defeating a kaiju with Keith and Auggie, Chris happily meets with the other Harcourt.

== Production ==
=== Development ===
In February 2022, when Peacemaker was renewed for a second season, James Gunn was confirmed to write all episodes. The episode was written by Gunn, and directed by Alethea Jones. It marked Gunn's 13th writing credit, and Jones' first directing credit.

=== Writing ===
Frank Grillo said that the fight with Chris was essential in showing a new reality for Flag Sr., "I think you see something happen to Flag in Episode 5 where he gets all of this out and he thinks it's going to be something, there's going to be some kind of finality or there's going to be some closure — and there's not. I think it's a lesson for everyone. It's not what's out there that's going to fix what's ailing me; it's what's inside that I need to work on. I think it's a turning point for Flag."

== Reception ==
Scott Meslow of Vulture gave the episode a 4 star rating out of 5 and wrote, "Peacemaker's second season has been a decidedly grimmer adventure than its first: more concerned with Chris's earnest attempt at redemption, even as it circles back to the original sins the rest of the world won't forget."

Joe George of Den of Geek wrote, "Whatever direction they go, it is clear that Gunn is following elements of Bordeaux's comic book origin. And if he follows that plot all the way to Gotham, then we're going to get a grouchy, paranoid Batman, someone far more unpleasant than any other live-action take on the Dark Knight." Kendall Myers of Collider gave the episode a 9 out of 10 rating and wrote, "With that goal, the team, minus Chris, is once again working together. Season 2 has seen them divided, reuniting largely for social events, but now they are back to their Season 1 glory, and it's about time. With this twist, the next episode should be even more exciting."

Felipe Rangel of Screen Rant wrote, "Sure, Peacemaker's decision makes sense. However, I can't shake off the feeling that something is wrong with the other dimension. With the door to it closed, the 11th Street Kids will have to figure out how to open it and get Chris back. Gunn has done a great job of making these characters feel like a family, and now they're after one of their own." Chris Gallardo of Telltale TV gave the episode a 4 star rating out of 5 and wrote, "As its midseason episode, Peacemaker Season 2 Episode 5 helps the pacing get running as the personal conflict between Flag Sr. and Chris is driven further into inevitable mayhem. With a stronger focus on the bonds that tie both of these characters together here, I'm hoping these last three episodes will nail in how serious the consequences will be."

Jarrod Jones of The A.V. Club gave the episode a "C+" grade and wrote, "It's been frustrating to see such a fun, clever series, which started this season so strongly with themes of regret and second chances, tie itself in knots to play in an exciting subdimensional sandbox while also reestablishing itself within a new DCU. When Gunn took over as creative head of DC Studios, the possibilities felt endless. The expanse of story possibilities seems to have put Peacemaker in a corner. And yet, paradoxically, this week's frantic episode leaves Chris on an emotional high."

=== Accolades ===
TVLine named John Cena the "Performer of the Week" for the week of September 20, 2025, for his performance in the episode. The site wrote, "From go, Peacemaker Season 2 has been about the titular Chris Smith being torn between the world he knows and a recently discovered parallel universe he dubbed “the best dimension ever.” Series frontman John Cena in turn has been handed his most complex material to play, and he's broken our hearts a bit along the way."
