= Ignorance Is Chris =

- Peacemaker episode
- Episode no.: Season 2 Episode 6
- Directed by: James Gunn
- Written by: James Gunn
- Cinematography by: Sam McCurdy
- Editing by: Gregg Featherman; Fred Raskin
- Original air date: September 25, 2025
- Running time: 35 minutes

Guest appearance
- Nicholas Hoult as Lex Luthor

Episode chronology
← Previous "Back to the Suture"	Next → "Like a Keith in the Night"
- Peacemaker season 2

"Ignorance Is Chris" is the sixth episode of the second season of the American black comedy superhero drama television series Peacemaker. It is the fourteenth overall episode of the series, and was written and directed by series creator James Gunn. It originally aired on HBO Max on September 25, 2025.

In the episode, the 11th Street Kids use the Quantum Unfolding Chamber and travel to Earth-2, where they discover its darker undertones while attempting to find Chris Smith / Peacemaker and bring him back to their reality. Meanwhile, A.R.G.U.S. director Rick Flag Sr. learns of their disappearance and makes a desperate deal to locate the QUC and track them down.

The episode received critical acclaim, with critics praising the episode's performances, Nicholas Hoult's guest appearance as Lex Luthor, character development, and its reveal of the twist of Earth-2.

== Plot ==
Under Emilia Harcourt's instructions, the 11th Street Kids use the basement under Adrian Chase's house as the location to open the portal to the Quantum Unfolding Chamber (QUC), leading to cocaine from Adrian's stash being blown onto the group. The team enters the door to the other universe and explores the Smiths' mansion. When Chris Smith's brother Keith arrives, Harcourt hides everyone to evade suspicion; Keith offers to take her to A.R.G.U.S., which she accepts, leaving the rest of the team behind. As Harcourt arrives, a dog detects the cocaine on her, forcing security to take her to an interrogation room. As she is taken, an arriving Chris sees her. Adrian decides to leave the house to visit his alternate house, marveled at the differences. He finds Adrian-2, who is near identical to him in appearance and mannerism.

Unable to find new leads to catch Peacemaker, Rick Flag Sr. goes to Belle Reve and meets with Lex Luthor, who has been sentenced to 265 years in prison for his crimes. (Note: As depicted in the film Superman (2025)) While Flag cannot release Luthor, he offers him a chance of redemption and a spot in a prison with no metahumans if he provides scanners to locate Peacemaker and his dimensional gateway, which Luthor accepts. Back in the alternate universe, Chris talks with Harcourt in custody. They argue again over their feelings, with Harcourt explaining that she feels broken and is unable to fully feel anything romantic for him. She is cleared of any charges, but Chris states he will stay in the other universe.

As Adrian gleefully interacts with his alternate self, he is shocked when the latter explains that he hates Peacemaker-2, that he is his archenemy, and joined the Sons of Liberty to fight against his crusade. Chris's father Auggie discovers John Economos and stabs his hand, accidentally causing him to confess Chris killed Peacemaker-2. At A.R.G.U.S., Harcourt notes that there are no people of color, before Chris finds a swastika in the US flag, replacing the stars, much to his shock. Harcourt-2 arrives, ordering the guards to arrest her other self. At the same time, Leota Adebayo leaves for a walk in the neighborhood, before she is chased by Keith and other white supremacists.

== Production ==
=== Development ===
In February 2022, when Peacemaker was renewed for a second season, James Gunn was confirmed to write all episodes. The episode was written and directed by Gunn. It marked Gunn's 14th writing credit, and seventh directing credit.

The episode reveals Earth-2 to be Earth-X, an alternate universe based on the comics where Nazi Germany won World War II and the world is populated with white supremacists. The twist was guarded closely, hence the episode was not sent to press for advance review. Gunn noted that nobody from his private test screenings noticed the twist, but acknowledged that several fans correctly guessed it after pointing out that there are no people of color in scenes involving Earth-X compared to the diverse background characters shown in primary universe. Gunn also hinted at exploring characters being brought up in "Nazi world" in future episodes.

The episode was filmed in October 2024 during the 2024 United States presidential election, with the cocaine scene filmed the day after. Gunn acknowledged that while "there are things from our actual world that influence what I'm writing," he reiterated the focus would continue to be the main cast, citing the scene involving Chris and Harcourt in the interrogation room as the "heart of the show."

=== Casting ===
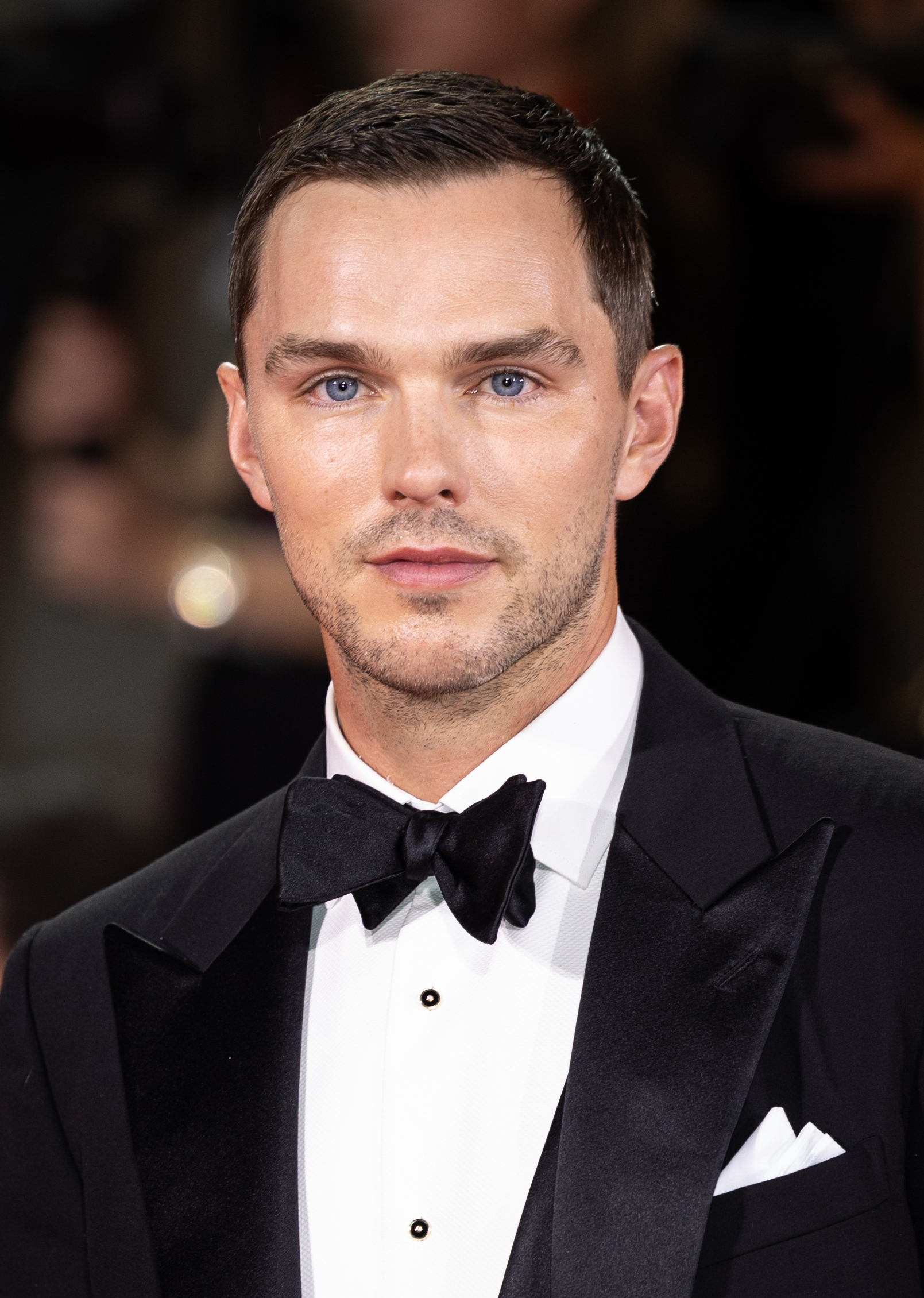
Nicholas Hoult guest stars as Lex Luthor in the episode.

The episode features a guest cameo appearance by Nicholas Hoult as Lex Luthor, reprising his role from the film Superman (2025). The scene between Luthor and Rick Flag Sr. was among the earliest material filmed for the second season, as it was shot concurrently with Hoult and Frank Grillo's scenes together in Superman. Gunn stated that the scheduling around filming Hoult's Superman and Peacemaker appearances "instantly" reflected the tonal differences between the character as depicted in the film and series, with Luthor's role in the latter being comparatively "grounded and gritty" due to the adult-oriented writing on Peacemaker. He shared that Superman actor David Corenswet was "very upset" that he was not on the show while Hoult was.

Gunn revealed that the character was set up for the follow-up episode, but moved it as he needed a "tonal transition" between the first half's humor and the second half's confrontation between Chris and Harcourt. He viewed the scene as a pivotal moment in the DC Universe (DCU) franchise, as it would lead up to Man of Tomorrow (2027). Gunn shared that Luthor and Flag's deal is a "potentially negative thing for Superman and all meta-humans."

== Reception ==
"Ignorance Is Chris" received critical acclaim. Scott Collura of IGN gave the episode a "great" 8 out of 10 and wrote in his verdict, "Peacemaker Season 2 has been a slow burn this season. Fun, but slow. And that pace continued for much of this episode before everything seemed to happen all at once, from the big movie cameo that we've been expecting/hoping for, to the reveal of the true nature of the Best Dimension Ever, to each of the 11th Street Kids actually getting to do exciting stuff again after a bit too much sitting around in past weeks."

Jarrod Jones of The A.V. Club gave the episode an "A" grade and wrote, "What a relief it is to have Peacemaker feel like Peacemaker again. A mission of great importance, handled by fuck-ups and dweebs — it's season one all over again, with all the surprise character beats, non-sequiturs, and unintended consequences that made it so memorable. Season two has dealt with heavier themes and explored the detritus of failed lives. It's been consistently enjoyable but difficult to ignore that the episodes building to this dimensional hop have been a shuffle where the series used to strut. This week struts."

Scott Meslow of Vulture gave the episode a perfect 5 star rating out of 5 and wrote, "It's hard to say that retreating back into the quantum unfolding chamber would be a worse fate than being permanently trapped in a Nazi universe, but squaring off against an A.R.G.U.S. task force wouldn't exactly be a happy homecoming, either."

Joe George of Den of Geek wrote, "Hopefully, Man of Tomorrow will see Lex starting to understand that. Because if Chris Smith can go from a dumb jingoistic to someone appalled by American Nazis, then maybe there's hope for Lex Luthor as well." Kendall Myers of Collider gave the episode a 9 out of 10 rating and wrote, "The stakes are higher than ever as the so-called better world turns out to be a horrific place, not safe for any one of the heroes now stuck in it."

Felipe Rangel of Screen Rant wrote, "Peacemaker season 2's new episode is easily one of my favorites of the whole show. That said, it was way too short. That has become the norm for many Marvel and DC series, but I don't see why a show like Peacemaker, which is not as heavy on CGI as other superhero entries, has to follow that pattern." Chris Gallardo of Telltale TV gave the episode a 4.5 star rating out of 5 and wrote, "Peacemaker Season 2 Episode 6 did a very good job in revealing its big universal twist while still staying true to its themes of perfectionism through Chris and Harcourt's deep moments."
