= It's Superman! =

2005 novel by Tom De Haven

- Two covers from the hardcover and paperback editions of the novel.
- Author: Tom De Haven
- Language: English
- Genre: Superhero fiction
- Publisher: Chronicle Books & Ballantine Books
- Publication date: September 15, 2005 (hardcover); August 29, 2006 (paperback)
- Publication place: United States
- Media type: Print (hardback & paperback)
- Pages: 384 (hardcover) 432 (paperback) pp

It's Superman! is a novel by Tom De Haven based on the comic book superhero Superman. It was released on September 15, 2005, in hardcover and August 29, 2006, in paperback. The premise tells the tale of Clark Kent's beginnings into becoming Superman, set in the 1930s, where Clark befriends a wrongly convicted photographer named Willi Berg, and is then taken from Kansas to Hollywood and finally in New York where he meets Lois Lane, fights Lex Luthor, as he debuts in his superhero persona. Despite the setting, this is not about the Golden Age Superman also known as the Superman of Earth-2. Rather, it's a Superman period piece set in the 1930s.

== Plot ==
In Smallville, Kansas, of 1935, Clark Kent is interviewed by the local sheriff over the death of a wanted man that Clark confronted at the local movie theatre. They believe the man died from his handgun firing backwards, but Clark and his father, Jonathan Kent, know the real truth: the man fired his gun at Clark, and the bullet bounced off Clark's forehead, killing the wanted man instead. Clark is scared over what he is becoming, with his father providing no answers to his questions. To make matters worse, Clark's beloved mother, Martha Kent, dies of a terminal illness not soon after. In Manhattan, Willi Berg storms out from his girlfriend, Lois Lane's, apartment over an argument concerning getting his camera from the pawn shop, so he decides to steal it. Arriving, he discovers several men dead, and gets wounded by the gang when he tries to escape after seeing the face of their leader: Lex Luthor, New York's leading Alderman. Lex frames Willi for the murders, with no one believing Willi's truth of the events. A henchwoman attempts to murder Willi at the hospital when she is stopped by federal agents, led by Meyer Lansky. With their help, and Lois's, Willi goes on the run, finding himself in Smallville as a member of the WPA. He meets Clark, now a reporter for the Smallville Herald Progress, and befriends him after he shows off his superspeed. After solving the crime of a kidnapped child that ends tragically, Clark quits the paper and Willi proposes for them to leave Smallville and travel. Because he wants to see what else is out there, Clark agrees.

In 1937, Clark has a job as a Hollywood stuntman, and is dating costume designer Diana Dewey. Willi meets with Lois' former roommate, Skinny, where he is found by police and is arrested. Clark tries out a costume that was made for a canceled science fiction film: a blue leotard with a red cape and a red and black "S". After he discovers his ability to fly, Clark puts on the costume and frees Willi from the police. Clark and Willi head back to New York where they meet back up with Lois, now a reporter for the Daily Planet. Clark falls instantly in love with Lois, and at their new apartment, they describe their "friend" who freed Willi from the cops: Superman. Lois reveals the case that had been building against Lex Luthor has been dropped, due to the death of the head agent of the case, and the missing evidence. Willi becomes depressed, as the odds his name being cleared for murder now seems impossible. In a shocking turn of events, Lex announces his resignation from his Alderman position, and from his company, LUTHOR Corp., he initiates the construction of weaponized robots dubbed "Lexbots".

On Halloween Night, Clark tries to cheer up Willi as they walk throughout the city. At the same time, Lois joins her former boyfriend, an ex-cop named Ben, when he is called by Ceil Stickowski, widow of one of Lex' old henchmen, who wants to reveal secret information on Luthor's plans. A gun fight occurs outside between them and henchman Paulie Scaffa, who murders Ceil in the process and shoots Ben. Paulie takes off until he is stopped by Clark, wearing his Superman costume. He damages the car to get Paulie out, but it causes a Lexbot to activate from inside the trunk, and attack Superman. After the Lexbot goes haywire, destroying city blocks that leaves several building on fire. a bruised and exhausted Superman finally destroys the robot and escapes when police arrive. Lois is "introduced" to Superman, while they find a piece of the robot with the LUTHOR Corp. logo on it. Thanks to both that and Clark's article on Superman himself, Lex Luthor is called to be arrested, while Clark gets a job at the Daily Planet. Before he is arrested, Superman meets with Lex at his home; as Lex talks about how similar the two are, making them "perfect rivals", Lex forces his assistant to jump from the window. Superman saves the assistant, but Luthor escapes.

In the closing chapter, the central characters watch the play Our Town in February 1938, while Clark reflects on what has happened to him and Superman since that night. While he has saved countless lives, and was given a new more powerful costume with a red and yellow "S" by a still on the run Lex Luthor, Clark sometimes hates his Superman persona because of the pressures put upon him. He is reluctant to have a chat with FDR, and is heartbroken that Lois dislikes Clark but loves Superman. As the play ends, he thinks of what his father said to him just before he died recently; to use his powers for good, as not doing so wouldn't be fair for everyone. Lois notices Clark sobbing in his theater box and, surprised by her own concern, calls out to him. She finally gains his attention by throwing a shoe at him, and when she sees Clark takes off his glasses, she develops the classic suspicion that Clark and Superman are one and the same. At the same time, Clark realizes that he will love her for the rest of his life and that love will fuel him to do his best for the world. He has struggled through the entire book to feel "like everyone else", and now, he is "like everyone else".

== Main characters ==
- Clark Kent is the protagonist, who later goes by the alter ego of Superman. The adopted son of farmers Jonathan and Martha Kent, Clark is a shy, quiet and insecure young man who feels "there" in society because of his alienation. He possesses "talents" such as super strength, speed, flight, and much more. No matter how many people he is surrounded by, he feels alone. This is because he feels that they can not relate to him (ironically the only person who does is his nemesis, Lex Luthor). Unlike most mythos, Clark is given a more "human" approach, much like an "everyman", that subjects him with the same humane actions and temptations that would go against his comic book counterpart, while still not astraying from his "boy scout" image. Examples include an angsty brooding nature more reminiscent of Batman than Superman, and moments where he breaks the law and uses his powers to his advantage. Also unlike the mythos, Clark is unaware of his Kryptonian origins. Instead, he at one point recalls a dream where a planet is dying of old age and a scientist and his wife send their son off to a rocket ship. Plus, he is jokingly told by his father that he came "from a "wagon", suggesting it might have been an airship that dropped a bomb (under this assumption, they do not understand why a bomb would contain a baby), but it is Clark who suggests to his denying father, that he must be an alien from another planet.
- Willi Berg is a photographer, Lois Lane's ex-boyfriend, and, eventually, Clark Kent's best friend. Known for his past of getting into trouble; no one believes him when he is accused of murder, saying he was framed by Lex Luthor, New York's alderman. He is saved by the FBI, and with the help of Lois, gets a job with the WPA, where he meets Clark. It is because of Willi that Clark develops his powers, leaves Smallville, and he and Clark together create Clark's dual-identity, making Clark and Superman two separate people. It is alluded that Willi intended to use Clark and his abilities for his own purposes to get him out of the jam he was in, but went against that idea as he was starting to like Clark. Willi dyes his hair red while on the lam, making him reminiscent of the Daily Planet's red-headed photographer, Jimmy Olsen (who does not appear in this book, though was going to be Willi's false identity when he was on the run in the original proposal).
- Lois Lane begins as a student at Columbia University journalism school, before becoming a reporter for the Daily Planet. Described as a "pistol" by the novel's reviewers, Lois will do anything to get the story, including getting the dirt on Lex Luthor, and will not let anything or anyone stop her in the male-dominated journalistic world. Her intelligence, self-confidence and beauty attract an impressive number of men, including Willi Berg and Ben Jaeger. She is an army brat; with the man she grew up being a hard-nosed retired army captain (in the comics, he is a general). She occasionally fears she will never meet a man where the relationship lasts, and she isn't put down because she is a woman. Her relationship with Clark is complicated; as she knows she can easily have him, she expresses disinterest and sometimes scorn when he asks her out. She always makes jokes about him, but she does not mean it, and she is not as cold-hearted as she makes herself appear.
- Lex Luthor is the main antagonist, an alderman in New York, and in charge of his company, LUTHOR Corp. Luthor is the man responsible for framing Willi Berg after he is spotted at the murder scene of a pawn shop owner. Under his respectable disguise of an alderman, Lex secretly runs a criminal empire from within Manhattan, his connections allowing him to evade the long arm of the law. Lex's criminal actions are motivated, at least in part, by trying to outrun the memory of his father, himself a fugitive who lived in fear of being caught. Lex is embarrassed by his drunken, painfully honest mother, so much so, that after her funeral he confesses to her headstone that he never loved her. Despite his ruthlessness, Lex is the epitome of social grace; no racial slurs or coarse language are tolerated in his ranks. The connection between Lex and Clark/Superman is founded on how similar the two characters are revealed to be; not only in the outward "face" each presents to the world but the feelings of isolation which motivate those deceptions.
- Jonathan and Martha Kent are the owners of their self-named farm, as well as the loving parents of their adopted son, Clark. Before Clark came into their lives, the Kents could not conceive, and Jonathan felt happy about that, due to his past with his own father to whom he disrespected. Because of Clark being "different", Jonathan could not help nor understand what must have been going in Clark's mind to answer his questions, making Jonathan feel as if he had been a bad father. All evidence, however, points to him as the opposite: a patient and loving man who gives Clark his moral conscience (and a few grammar lessons). Jonathan's encouragement becomes one of the reasons he becomes Superman, and why he stays being Superman even after experiencing some fears. Martha dies early in the novel, but her presence is still felt through the minds of both Clark and Jonathan, mentioning her background, her faith, and her past as a pioneer woman. Jonathan follows suit near the end and dies too; just like his wife, it appears to be of natural causes, hastened, it appears, by the loneliness brought on by Martha's death and Clark's departure for the wider world.

== Other characters ==
Sheriff Bill Dutcher, is the Sheriff of the county in which Smallville, Kansas is located. His duty is dealing with the crimes that occur in the unincorporated county area surrounding Smallville, two of which feature and involve Clark Kent. He is sometimes accompanied by other law enforcement officers, such as Doug Parker, Smallville's local Chief of Police, and later with FBI Agent Foley.

Jiggs Markley and the Markley Gang are criminals on the FBI's most wanted list who find themselves in Smallville, Kansas. Jiggs is killed by what the Sheriffs of Smallville believe his gun firing backwards while confronting Clark Kent at the Jewel movie theatre (in reality, the bullet bounced off Clark's forehead). Three others from the gang, made up by Ike "Curly Ike" Kelting, Milt George, and Claude Draper, later kidnap and murder the child of a banker they were holding for ransom. The gang is later taken down, while Ike is killed in a car crash caused by Clark, covering the incident for his town's newspaper. All others from the gang are mentioned to have fled to Mexico.

Alger Lee is a young African-American man, who first appears working for the Jewel movie theatre, and later at the Kent Farm (like his father did) when Clark starts moving on away and Jonathan Kent becomes weaker due to old age. Alger knows Clark, and knows Clark can do things no other man can do, but keeps it a secret just like Willi. It is assumed that, after the passing of Jonathan Kent, that Alger and his family get the farm thanks to their generosity.

Paulie Scaffa and Herman "Sticky" Stickowski are two of Lex Luthor's well-known henchmen. They perform their duties but Lex wants them to do them, and try not to get their boss angry at either one of them from whatever mistakes they make on purpose or not. Paulie is the son of a father who does not appreciate anything he does, even after showing him a Lexbot robot. Because of that, he hates his father. Sticky, already terminally ill, is smothered to death by Lex, who then offers his wife, Ceil, a job managing a brothel. Ceil Stickowski continues to nearly worship Lex until, near the end of the novel, she realizes he murdered her beloved husband. She is later killed by Paulie when Mrs. O'Shea learns that Ceil is about to spill all she know about Lex's robots to Lois Lane during a fight between Superman and a Lexbot the thug has foolishly hidden in the trunk of his car.

Skinny Simon is a friend of Willi and Lois, and is ironically nicknamed Skinny because of her voluptuous figure. She works at a hospital in Manhattan and is the first to tell Lois when Willi is shot. Later, she and Willi meet in Hollywood where she is almost murdered by her husband. Despite these ordeals, she perseveres and eventually finds herself back in New York. She eventually marries Ben Jaeger.

Dick Sandglass is a New York City detective; has a son nicknamed Spider, and is admired by both Willi Berg and his fellow partner, Ben Jaeger. He spends two years investigating the link between a "ghost gang of criminals" and Alderman Lex Luthor. Because of his investigation, Sandglass is later murdered by Luthor's men, and his son dies afterward while trying to rescue his father.

Caesar Colluzo is a self-taught engineer who is hired by Lex Luthor to design ultra-powerful, omnipresent robots. After the creation of the Lexbots are a success, Lex murders Caesar so that he will not reveal Lex's secrets.

Diana Dewey is briefly Clark's girlfriend - and his first lover - when he is living in Hollywood, California, working as a stuntman. A former actress; Diana is a costume designer for various movies, one was of which that becomes cancelled was going to be "The Saucer Man from Saturn". Clark tries out the only outfit made for the film which later becomes the Superman costume. By the time Clark and Willi are in New York, Diana is never seen again. One idea is that Diana might've seemed uncomfortable after Clark revealed what he could do and later after he freed Willi from jail was possibly eager to rid herself of Clark, but there is no evidence to support that theory. The only thing the novel does is that, once Clark meets and is smitten by Lois Lane, he doesn't seem to remember Diana at all.

Ben Jaeger is a New York City cop, a protegee of Dick Sandglass, and the boyfriend (later ex-boyfriend) of Lois Lane. After the death of his mentor, Sandglass, Jaeger is hit hard and becomes obsessed with nailing. Even during this obsession, he brings Lois candy, but she is put off by his intense, brooding, single-minded demeanor. He is shot in the chest twice by Paulie and nearly dies, but later recovers, and finds a new lease on life working at the theatre with his first gig being involved with the play Our Town.

Helen O'Shea (mainly called Mrs. O'Shea) is Lex Luthor's personal assistant, but after she murders the son of Dick Sandglass, she becomes Lex' full partner and his lover. Her husband, Denholm is serving a 50-year prison sentence for murdering a union organizer with a shed cutter. Lex met O'Shea after she was sent to the House of Detention for Women in Greenwich Village, and has been working for him since. Once she realizes Ceil Stickowski is going to inform Lois Lane on Luthor's Lexbots, she goes out to kill her, only to be killed herself by Paulie Scaffa, one of Lex's henchmen, who also kills Ceil.

Edith "Soda" Wauters is a singer and owner of a jazz music club named after her nickname, and the mistress of late Dick Sandglass. A twice divorcee, Soda fell in love at first sight toward Sandglass (though he never told her his last name, and lied saying he was not a cop). She is devastated when he stops coming around, eventually realizing he is dead. It is only when she remembers the package he left for her to keep safe (a copy of the same one that was to be used against Lex Luthor, but was destroyed after Sandglass was murdered) that a drunken Soda heads out and after some dead ends, makes it to the Daily Planet the next day, where she meets Clark Kent. She and Clark later become friends, as evidenced by Clark's birthday present to her by taking her to see "Out Town", and by Soda dedicating the song "Someone to Watch Over Me" anytime he visits her club.

== Background ==
After the release of his 1985 book, Funny Papers, Tom De Haven began working on the novella Sunborn Lake. From the work done in creating it, De Haven ended up falling in love with the 1930s, the period the first of his novellas was set in. After the release of Derby Dugan Depression Funnies, the sequel to Funny Papers, in 1996, De Haven got a call from DC, asking if he would be interested in doing a Superman novel set in the same period as Depression Funnies, the 1930s. De Haven was honored at first, because of the iconic nature of the character, but on the other hand felt unsure as he would not own the copyright as he had done for his previous works. Nevertheless, he accepted the job, but he was already committed in writing Dugan Under Ground, and wanted to finish that first. DC agreed, even though that novel was finally published in September 2001, four years later. During that time, DC gave De Haven copies of Superman's early stories found in the pages of DC Archive Editions, for the writer to study.

For De Haven, he wanted It's Superman! to be a straight adult novel, with little irony, and very real world (New York instead of the more famous Metropolis), as much as he wanted the Clark Kent/Superman who was an average Joe like Jerry Siegel's and Joe Shuster's version. A coming of age story where everything that made up the 1930s, religion, politics, or the world, influenced the mind of main character. It was De Haven's idea to end the story with Clark ready to experience his life experiences as Superman, different from similar stories of the norm where everything is all set in the end. This was done for readers to easily have confidence in Clark because of the story's main events as the book closes.

After De Haven's pitch proposal, Chronicle Books made the offer to publish the novel. Even with the contract to finish the manuscript within one year, it ended up taking up to two-and-a-half years to complete. The finished manuscript ran up to 1000 pages long and De Haven was allowed more time to cut the book down to a more reasonable page length in early 2005. Elements that were removed included the backstory on Lex Luthor, a subplot involving a Russian spy after Luthor's "Lexbot" plans, more about Diana Dewey, Clark's girlfriend from Hollywood, more on Martha Kent, and more. Losing the material was not missed on De Haven's part, as it made the book shorter, or as he put it, "faster than a speeding bullet".

== Response ==
Reviews of It's Superman! were overall generally positive. Readers applauded the 1930s details, from movies to even the brands of cigarettes, as well as the book's nature to "suck them into" the story. The New York Times described the novel as "delightful with energy and imagination", and Entertainment Weekly stated that the book is "textured with authentic faces, places, and attitudes. Various websites went as far as to put the novel side by side with non-superhero novels such as The Grapes of Wrath and The Outsiders. Comic Geek Speak, a fan podcast dealing with comics and other media, did an episode about the novel, where De Haven was also a guest. The novel was praised by the podcast, where the hosts stated that they liked the novel's story being original, and the depiction of Clark, where he was seen as "..a much more 'human' Clark than we are used to seeing in comics and other media". It was also brought up that this novel alone had gotten every one of the hosts interested in other novels based on comic books and superheroes, noting Batman: The Ultimate Evil as one example.

Some reviewers though felt the opposite, to which De Haven described in his entry on the Thunder Child website that he felt those readers "didn't get it". One example was from Superman Homepage.com; while one reviewer gave the novel a positive review, the other reviewer gave a negative one, feeling that, regardless of how intelligent the novel was, it should have been a superhero novel, and thus felt ripped off. The reviewer noted that there was only one battle in the book, and the actions Clark/Superman does in the novel were not "Superman-like", and went as far as to say the character was stupid. Those alone were defended by De Haven himself from the Thunder Child website, where he described that he was in "disgust" over the negative comments, and he explained that "he is a young man who grew up in his time and his place and was educated according to the theories and with the tools of that context (he went to Smallville High, not Phillips Exeter Academy, for crying out loud). He worries that he's not smart enough to do the things that he wants to do, feels he should do, but he manages to put aside, if never completely overcome, those feelings of inadequacy, and to me that's heroic. Why would anyone think a 17-20 year old kid from a tiny farming town in eastern Kansas would move out into the greater world and immediately, instinctively believe he could compete with a big-city politician like Lex Luthor or engage in an easygoing man-to-man conversation with the President of the United States?" Comic Geek Speak joined De Haven in his comments, with co-host Bryan Deemer saying that he liked It's Superman!'s Clark because he himself was tired of seeing Clark as the "perfect angel" all the time, adding that Clark's actions made sense for him to do because he was a kid, and it will still lead him into the boy scout he will soon evolve into. Also, co-host Peter Rios pointed out that he saw the scenes where the doubtful Clark did not "get it", as scenes where Clark came across as "alien...which is exactly what he is".
