= Neva Howell =

American actress

- Born: October 31, 1955 (age 71); Manchester, Tennessee, U.S.
- Occupation: Actress
- Years active: 1989–present

Neva Howell (/ˈniːvə/ NEE-və) is an American actress. She is best known for playing Martha Kent in the 2025 superhero film Superman.

== Early life ==
Howell was born in Tennessee. As a child she would act out songs in front of her family. Her family moved frequently when she was younger. She attended North Sand Mountain High School in Bryant, Alabama, before graduating from Dade County High School in Trenton, Georgia. While attending Northeast Alabama Community College in Rainsville, Alabama, she performed in every play put on in her time as a student, and she met Ann Everitt, who convinced her to audition for the National Shakespeare Conservatory in New York City.

== Career ==
Shows and films she has appeared in include Ned's Declassified School Survival Guide, The Originals, and Diary of a Wimpy Kid: The Long Haul. Her first big role in a movie was playing Ms. Crawford in the 2024 crime comedy Greedy People. Her biggest role so far has been playing Ma Kent in the superhero film Superman. When she first auditioned, a year and a half before the film's release, she was unaware she was Superman's mother. After getting the role she felt relieved after having many near misses in the past.

== Personal life ==
When she is not traveling for auditions or filming, Howell lives in Trenton, and stays busy with online resale.

== Filmography ==
=== Film ===
Year	Title	Role	Notes
1989	Deadly Addiction	Dancer in Nightclub	
1993	The Conviction of Kitty Dodds	Millie	
1996	My Fellow Americans	Charlene	
1999	October Sky	Neighbour	
1999	A Good Baby	Woman at Mailboxes	
2003	A Painted House	Darla Latcher	
2005	Worms	Petty J. Sackamn Strubble	Short
2006	Two Weeks	Grocery Clerk	
2008	Billy: The Early Years	Shea Secretary	
2014	The Cameraman	Irene Wilkes	Short
2014	Strangers Yesterday	Ms. Quinn	Short
2014	Fever Dreams	Irene Wilkes	
2017	Novitiate	Sister Eleanor	
2017	Diary of a Wimpy Kid: The Long Haul	Farmer Lady	
2017	Logan Lucky	Woman on the News	
2017	The Nobodies	Woman	
2018	Burden	Gina	
2018	Run the Race	Martha	
2019	Fever Dreams Movie	Irene Wilkes	
2021	Bennie	Josie	Short
2021	Ghosts of the Ozarks	Miss Roberts	
2024	Greedy People	Ms. Crawford	
2025	Superman	Martha Kent	
2027	Man of Tomorrow	Martha Kent	

=== Television ===
Year	Title	Role	Notes
2005	America's Most Wanted	Wanda Jane Parnell	Episode; Jason Morris Howard
2007	Ned's Declassified School Survival Guide	Alien Abduction Woman	Episode; Fundraising & Competition
2011-2013	Beckinfield	Leda Jo Gupta	31 episodes
2013	The Castlehassle	The Nanny	2 episodes
2013	The Edge of Sanity	Nurse Gertrude	7 episodes
2016	Still the King	Waitress June	Episode; The King Has Left the Building
2017	Mercy Street	Alma	2 episodes
2017	Outcast	DeeDee	2 episodes
2018	The Originals	Bus Driver	Episode; Ne Me Quitte Pas
2019	The Resident	Sour Apple	Episode; Stuck as Foretold
