= Superman: Brainiac Attacks =

2006 film by Curt Geda

- DVD cover
- Directed by: Curt Geda
- Screenplay by: Duane Capizzi
- Story by: Christopher Simmons; Duane Capizzi
- Based on: Superman by Jerry Siegel and Joe Shuster
- Produced by: Margaret M. Dean
- Starring: Tim Daly; Powers Boothe; Dana Delany; Lance Henriksen; George Dzundza; David Kaufman; Mike Farrell; Shelley Fabares
- Edited by: Margaret Hou
- Music by: Thomas Chase Jones
- Production companies: DC Comics; Warner Bros. Animation
- Distributed by: Warner Home Video
- Release date: June 20, 2006
- Running time: 77 minutes
- Country: United States
- Language: English

Superman: Brainiac Attacks is a 2006 American animated superhero film from Warner Bros. Animation. First airing on June 17, 2006 on Cartoon Network's Toonami block and releasing on home video June 20, 2006, as a marketing tie in with Superman Returns, the film features Superman battling the forces of Lex Luthor and Brainiac, and his relationship with Lois Lane.

The film used the animation style of Superman: The Animated Series and featured most of its main cast, although it is independent from the DCAU.

This is Shelley Fabares's final performance before her retirement and passing in 2026.

== Plot ==
Brainiac crash lands back on Earth and hijacks Lex Labs to collect Earth's data and amass the power of its weapons systems. Lois Lane and Jimmy Olsen are sent to one of Lex Luthor's laboratories after Brainiac arrives on Earth on a meteor, successfully dodging attempts made by Luthor's satellite Lex 9000 to destroy him in an attempt to boost his popularity against Superman. Superman shortly arrives and finds Brainiac downloading data from the computers with information relating to LexCorp weaponry. After a battle, Superman seemingly destroys Brainiac with his ice breath.

Witnessing the incident, and seeing how his satellite could be used as an effective weapon against Superman, Luthor finds Brainiac's intact brain chip and uses it to reactivate him. He then proposes that Brainiac, with the technology of LexCorp as well as Kryptonite, defeat Superman, and then Luthor would step in to chase Brainiac away from the Earth, making him appear to be a hero, where he will then be free to conquer other planets, leaving Luthor in charge of Earth. Brainiac accepts the agreement, and proceeds to rebuild and improve himself using Lex 9000 as his new body.

Meanwhile, Clark Kent contemplates revealing his secret identity to Lois. The opportunity presents itself when editor Perry White, due to staff shortages, sends Clark and Lois to review a restaurant in Metropolis. However, Brainiac returns, injuring Superman and Lois with his Kryptonite rays. It is revealed that Lois has been infected with a metallic-based poison that if not treated, would prove fatal.

Feeling guilty, Superman obtains a sample of Lois' blood from the hospital and returns to the Fortress of Solitude to analyze it, discovering that the only cure for her condition is the chemical Argonium 44, obtained from the Phantom Zone. However, Brainiac is able to locate Superman in his Antarctic retreat, and attempts to download the information of Krypton from his computer. Superman then initiates a self-destruct sequence and escapes to the Phantom Zone, with Brainiac presuming him to be dead.

Brainiac returns to Metropolis where Luthor awaits to fulfill their agreement. Jimmy investigates Luthor and realizes that he is working with Brainiac. Brainiac, however, intends to kill Luthor to conquer Earth, and had even removed the self-destructive component that Luthor had planted should Brainiac betray him. Superman seemingly returns through a portal and cures Lois, but when bringing her out of the hospital, he realizes this is an illusion created by the Phantom Zone. After this, he is chased and attacked by several Phantoms before escaping.

Returning to Metropolis, Superman and Brainiac engage in a lengthy battle, during which Luthor is injured in the crossfire. Mercy Graves discovers Jimmy looking for evidence against Luthor and brutally attacks him. Eventually he takes over one of Luthor's robot exoskeletons and knocks her unconscious. Unfortunately, his camera is destroyed by his attack, preventing him from obtaining evidence of Luthor's schemes. Superman seemingly defeats Brainiac and then returns to the hospital to cure Lois. But before Lois can take the cure, Brainiac attacks the hospital and smashes the cure, before Superman destroys him by breaking his brain chip.

With the cure now destroyed, Lois faces certain death. Superman, regretting never telling Lois his true feelings then embraces her. It is then that his tears, containing Argonium 44 that had healed him earlier, makes contact with Lois, curing her. She presumes him to be Clark, but Superman convinces her otherwise. Later, Superman recovers a piece of his destroyed Kryptonian technology, planning to use it to rebuild his fortress. He then vows to quit his job at the Daily Planet in an attempt to prevent future harm to his loved ones, should any of his enemies discover his secret identity.

The film ends with an injured Luthor facing criminal prosecution from his involvement in Brainiac's attack, and Lois racing to cover the appearance of Mister Mxyzptlk in Metropolis. Seeing Lois' eagerness to put herself in harm's way to cover a story, Superman goes back on his earlier decision to quit the Daily Planet so he can be with her.

== Cast ==
- Tim Daly as Kal-El / Clark Kent / Superman
- Lance Henriksen as Brainiac
- Powers Boothe as Lex Luthor
- Dana Delany as Lois Lane
- George Dzundza as Perry White
- David Kaufman as Jimmy Olsen
- Mike Farrell as Jonathan Kent
- Shelley Fabares as Martha Kent
- Tara Strong as Mercy Graves

== Production ==
The film was directed by Curt Geda, who worked on Superman: The Animated Series. The classic style was desired by Warner Bros, with Geda adding more humor and romance than previously explored in the animated series. Despite the film's visual style and much of its voice cast being the same as Superman: The Animated Series, writer Duane Capizzi has stated the film was not intended to be part of the DC Animated Universe. Additionally, DCAU cast members Clancy Brown (Lex Luthor), Corey Burton (Brainiac) and Lisa Edelstein (Mercy Graves) are absent from the film, with Powers Boothe, Lance Henriksen and Tara Strong voicing their respective characters instead.

This depiction of Lex Luthor, rather than being the cold, calculating industrialist portrayed in Superman: The Animated Series, seems to incorporate elements of Gene Hackman's less serious portrayals of the character in live-action films, making Luthor more light-hearted and darkly whimsical.
