= Tom De Haven =

American writer and journalist

- Born: 1949 (age 76–77); Bayonne, New Jersey, U.S.
- Education: Rutgers University; Bowling Green State University (MFA)
- Occupations: Author; professor; private investigator

Tom De Haven (born 1949) is an American author, editor, journalist, and writing teacher. His recurring subjects include literary and film noir, the Hollywood studio system and the American comics industry. De Haven is noted for his comics-themed novels, including the Derby Dugan trilogy and It's Superman!.

== Life and career ==
De Haven was born in Bayonne, New Jersey. He attended Catholic school, where he was a classmate of fellow author George R. R. Martin, though he notes that they weren't friends, even though Martin was an editor of the school newspaper where he was a cartoonist.

De Haven originally wanted to be a cartoonist before attending college, but by the time he graduated from the university, he realized that he would never be a professional cartoonist, and considers the realization "the First Great Disappointment of My Life". He received a Sociology degree from Rutgers University in 1971 and an MFA from Bowling Green State University in 1973.

An avid reader of comic books and graphic novels, De Haven considers himself a narrative writer, and considers the storytelling style of comics to have been a major influence on his writing since he was a child of almost six or seven.

He began teaching creative writing part-time at Hofstra University in 1981, before moving in 1987 to Rutgers to teach American Studies (including one of the first college courses on American comics) before relocating to Richmond, Virginia to become a full-time teacher.

De Haven is currently a full professor of Creative Writing at Virginia Commonwealth University in Richmond, Virginia in the MFA program, and often teaches at least one American Studies course, including "The Graphic Novel". De Haven is also the co-creator with author Laura Browder of the VCU Cabell First Novelist Award, honoring the best debut novel published during a calendar year. He is also a licensed private investigator. He considers himself a Democrat, and has been criticized for anti-Republican statements he has made over the years.

The author noted in an interview that he agreed with Robert Crumb's observation that the Thirties was the pinnacle of American culture. He also notes in the same interview that he finds truth to Art Spiegelman's statement "that we are, for whatever reason, most nostalgic for the decade before the one we were born in", as he was born in the Forties.

As a freelance journalist, he has written criticism for publications such as The New York Times Book Review and Entertainment Weekly. De Haven's novels include the Funny Paper trilogy (consisting of Funny Papers (1985), Derby Dugan's Depression Funnies (1996) and Dugan Under Ground (2001)). The trilogy's storyline stretches from the beginnings of the newspaper comic strips in the 1890s to the 1970s.

The New York Times Book Review called the Derby Dugan books "a mighty accomplishment: John Dos Passos's U.S.A. trilogy for comic geeks." The Boston Globe hails the trilogy as a "wild ride".

In 2005, his novel It's Superman! reinvented the early years of the well-known superhero of the same name amidst the Great Depression. The author noted his initial apprehension when he was contacted by DC Comics in 1997 in regards to writing a novel about Superman: "[S]hould I do a novel with a character that I don't own? So I had to think about it, but I didn't think about it very long, really. I just thought [...] this is too good to let go [...] they were giving me carte blanche." He states that his prior novels about comic strips are what prompted DC to contact him about writing the period piece. For the novel, he took as his inspiration the early Superman stories of the 1930s through the 1950s, in which the hero is less concerned with super-villains and Lex Luthor and more with clearing slums in the New Deal era and exposing corrupt politicians. De Haven says he was aiming for his hero to develop a social conscience during the Great Depression. His only intentional departure from creators' Jerry Siegel and Joe Shuster conception of the character was to relocate the character from Cleveland, Ohio, where some of the earliest Superman stories had given as his home. De Haven changed this to "Metropolis" of New York City.

== Awards and honors ==
De Haven's awards include a fellowship from the New Jersey State Council on the Arts, and he has twice won fellowships from the National Endowment for the Arts. His novel, Depression Funnies, received an American Book Award in 1997. Dugan Under Ground received the Library of Virginia Fiction Award (also called the Library of Virginia Literary Awards).

== Works ==
=== Novels ===
==== Adult fiction ====
- Freaks' Amour (1979)
- Jersey Luck: A Novel (1980)
- The Funny Papers Trilogy
  - Funny Papers (1985)
  - Derby Dugan's Depression Funnies (1996)
  - Dugan Under Ground: A Novel (2001)
- Joe Gosh (1988)
- Pixie Meat (1990)
- Chronicles of the King's Tramp
  - Walker of Worlds (1991)
  - End-Of-Everything Man (1992)
  - The Last Human (1992)
- It's Superman! (2005)

==== Children's and Young Adult fiction ====
- The Orphan's Tent (part of mult-author Chill series) (1986)
- U.S.S.A.: Book 1 (part of multi-author U.S.S.A. series) (1987)

=== Comics ===
- Neuromancer: the Graphic Novel, Volume 1 (1989) (adapted with Bruce Jensen from the novel by William Gibson)
- Green Candles (with artist Robin Smith, Paradox Graphic Mystery series) (1997)
- Love By Labor Lost (2010) (Co-writer, with David Kantor, illustrated by Kelly Alder)

=== Short fiction collections ===
- Sunburn Lake (1990)

=== Television ===
- Adventures of the Galaxy Rangers (1986)
  - "One Million Emotions" (1986)
  - "Galaxy Stranger" (1986)
  - "Rainmaker" (1986)

=== Nonfiction ===
- "In Flagrante Delicto"
- "Out in the Big Empty Spaces"
- Our Hero: Superman on Earth (part of the Icons of America series, 2011)
