= David Fleming (composer) =

American composer (born 1986)

- Origin: New York, United States
- Genres: Film and television scores, jazz, electronic, rock, ambient
- Occupation: Film composer
- Instruments: Piano, keyboards, synthesizer, guitar
- Years active: 2012–present
- Website: www.davidflemingmusic.com

David Fleming is an American composer for films, television, and interactive media. He is known for collaborating with various Remote Control Productions composers including Hans Zimmer, Atli Örvarsson, Lorne Balfe, Steve Jablonsky and Tom Holkenborg. In 2024, he won the ASCAP Screen Music Award for Television Score of the Year for his work on HBO's The Last of Us with Gustavo Santaolalla. He is also known for scoring films and series such as Blue Planet II, Hillbilly Elegy, Americana, Mr. & Mrs. Smith, Damsel, The Alto Knights and Superman.

== Career ==
=== Early career ===
David Fleming studied musical composition at State University of New York at Purchase. From there, he started his career in New York advertising companies, creating music for ringtones and liquor commercials. He won the BMI Foundation's Pete Carpenter Fellowship and moved to Los Angeles where he began writing music for major films.

=== 2017–present ===
In 2017, Fleming co-composed the BBC series Blue Planet II (2017) alongside Hans Zimmer, starting a collaborative relationship that saw Fleming contribute to films like The Lion King (2019), Dune (2021), and Top Gun: Maverick (2022), and co-compose films together such as Hillbilly Elegy, The Unforgivable, and The Night Logan Woke Up. Their work on Blue Planet II earned the score award nominations with the Jerry Goldsmith Awards and the International Film Music Critics Awards.

Fleming co-composed the original score for the television series The Last of Us (2023–present) with Gustavo Santaolalla. Fleming's work was inspired by real-world sounds within a decayed civilization. He largely worked on action-heavy music for the series, such as a large action sequence in the fifth episode. Like Santaolalla, he wanted to keep his score minimalistic and exercised restraint to match series co-creator Craig Mazin's goal of "having the viewer feel that they're part of the scene rather than be observing the scene". He selected specific instruments that paired appropriately with Santaolalla's work; rather than using a generic drum, he wanted one with "personality, whether it be a rusty barrel or like cracking wood or bowing, rusty metal".

In 2024, Fleming scored projects including Mr. & Mrs. Smith and Jim Henson Idea Man, for which he was nominated for Primetime Emmy Awards for Outstanding Music Composition for a Series and Outstanding Music Composition for a Documentary Series or Special, respectively. On June 7, 2024, Fleming performed his work to Mr. & Mrs. Smith at the Deadline Sound & Screen TV Event at Royce Hall at UCLA. Lead actor Donald Glover guided Fleming's score to focus on trust and the relationship between the characters. For Jim Henson Idea Man, Fleming wanted to carry the spirit of Jim Henson through the score. He also composed music for the film Damsel (2024).

== Filmography ==
=== Film ===
Year	Title	Director(s)	Notes	Ref.
2012	Revenge for Jolly!	Chadd Harbold		
2015	The Perfect Guy	David M. Rosenthal	Composed with Atli Örvarsson	
2020	Hillbilly Elegy	Ron Howard	Composed with Hans Zimmer	
2021	South of Heaven	Aharon Keshales		
2021	The Unforgivable	Nora Fingscheidt	Composed with Hans Zimmer	
2023	Americana	Tony Tost		
2024	Damsel	Juan Carlos Fresnadillo		
2024	Jim Henson Idea Man	Ron Howard		
2024	Bando Stone and the New World	Donald Glover		
2025	The Alto Knights	Barry Levinson		
2025	Superman	James Gunn	Composed with John Murphy; Includes "Superman March" composed by John Williams	
2025	Eternity	David Freyne		
2025	Anaconda	Tom Gormican		
2027	Man of Tomorrow	James Gunn	Post-production	

=== Television ===
Year	Title	Notes	Ref.
2017	Blue Planet II	7 episodes	
2022	The Night Logan Woke Up	5 episodes; with Hans Zimmer	
2023–present	The Last of Us	16 episodes; with Gustavo Santaolalla	
2024	Mr. & Mrs. Smith	8 episodes	
2026	Widow's Bay	10 episodes	

=== Video games ===
Year	Title	Notes	Ref.
2026	Marvel's Wolverine		

==== Other credits ====
Year	Title	Role	Composer(s)
2012–2023	Chicago Fire	additional music	Atli Örvarsson
2013	Hansel & Gretel: Witch Hunters	additional music	Atli Örvarsson
2013	A Single Shot	additional music	Atli Örvarsson
2013	Evidence	additional music	Atli Örvarsson
2013	The Mortal Instruments: City of Bones	additional music	Atli Örvarsson
2014–2015	Chicago P.D.	additional music	Atli Örvarsson
2014	Son of God	additional music	Hans Zimmer and Lorne Balfe
2014	Divergent	additional music	Tom Holkenborg
2014	Transformers: Age of Extinction	additional music	Steve Jablonsky
2015	Last Knights	additional music	Satnam Ramgotra and Martin Tillman
2016	Teenage Mutant Ninja Turtles: Out of the Shadows	additional music	Steve Jablonsky
2017	Transformers: The Last Knight	additional music	Steve Jablonsky
2017	What Happened to Monday	additional music	Christian Wibe
2018	Believer	additional music	Hans Zimmer
2019	Dark Phoenix	additional music	Hans Zimmer
2019	The Lion King	Arranger "Never Too Late", producer "Be Prepared"	Hans Zimmer
2020	Wonder Woman 1984	additional music	Hans Zimmer
2021	Dune: Part One	additional music	Hans Zimmer
2022	Top Gun: Maverick	additional music	Harold Faltermeyer, Lady Gaga and Hans Zimmer
2022	The Son	additional music	Hans Zimmer
2023	Are You There God? It's Me, Margaret.	additional music	Hans Zimmer
2024	Dune: Part Two	additional music	Hans Zimmer

== Awards and nominations ==
Accolades
Award	Year	Category	Nominated work	Result	Ref.
IFMCA Awards	2017	Best Original Score for a Documentary Film	Blue Planet II	Nominated	
Jerry Goldsmith Awards	2018	Best Documentary Score	Blue Planet II	Nominated	
ASCAP Screen Music Awards	2024	Composers' Choice: Television Score of the Year	The Last of Us	Won	
Primetime Creative Arts Emmy Awards	2024	Outstanding Music Composition for a Series (Original Dramatic Score)	Mr. & Mrs. Smith (for "First Date")	Nominated	
Primetime Creative Arts Emmy Awards	2024	Outstanding Music Composition for a Documentary Series or Special (Original Dramatic Score)	Jim Henson Idea Man	Won	
Primetime Creative Arts Emmy Awards	2026	Outstanding Music Composition for a Series (Original Dramatic Score)	Widow's Bay (for "Our History")	Won	
Hollywood Music in Media Awards	2024	Best Original Score in a Documentary	Jim Henson Idea Man	Nominated	
Grammy Awards	2027	Best Score Soundtrack for Video Games and Other Interactive Media	Marvel's Wolverine	Pending	
