= Superman (2025 film) =

DC Studios film by James Gunn

- Theatrical release poster
- Directed by: James Gunn
- Written by: James Gunn
- Based on: Characters from DC
- Produced by: Peter Safran; James Gunn
- Starring: David Corenswet; Rachel Brosnahan; Nicholas Hoult; Edi Gathegi; Anthony Carrigan; Nathan Fillion; Isabela Merced
- Cinematography: Henry Braham
- Edited by: William Hoy; Craig Alpert
- Music by: John Murphy; David Fleming
- Production companies: DC Studios; Troll Court Entertainment; The Safran Company
- Distributed by: Warner Bros. Pictures
- Release dates: July 7, 2025 (TCL Chinese Theater); July 11, 2025 (United States)
- Running time: 129 minutes
- Country: United States
- Language: English
- Budget: $225 million
- Box office: $618.7 million

Superman is a 2025 American superhero film written and directed by James Gunn. Based on the DC Comics character Superman, it is the first film in the DC Universe (DCU) and a reboot of the Superman film series. David Corenswet stars as Kal-El / Clark Kent / Superman, alongside Rachel Brosnahan, Nicholas Hoult, Edi Gathegi, Anthony Carrigan, Nathan Fillion, and Isabela Merced. In the film, Superman faces unintended consequences after he intervenes in an international conflict orchestrated by billionaire Lex Luthor (Hoult). Superman must win back public support with the help of his reporter and superhero colleagues. The film was produced by Gunn and Peter Safran of DC Studios.

Development on a sequel to the DC Extended Universe (DCEU) film Man of Steel (2013) began by October 2014, with Henry Cavill set to return as Superman. Plans changed after the troubled production of Justice League (2017), and the Man of Steel sequel was no longer moving forward by May 2020. Gunn began work on a new Superman film around August 2022. In October, he became co-CEO of DC Studios with Safran, and they began work on a new DC Universe. Gunn was publicly revealed to be writing the film in December. The title Superman: Legacy was announced the next month; Gunn was confirmed to direct in March 2023; and Corenswet and Brosnahan (Lois Lane) were cast that June. The subtitle was dropped by the end of February 2024, when filming began in Svalbard, Norway. Production primarily took place at Trilith Studios in Atlanta, Georgia, with location filming around Georgia and Ohio. Filming wrapped in July. Some of the film's major comic influences include All-Star Superman (2005–2008) by Grant Morrison and Frank Quitely and also Superman: Birthright (2003–2004) by Mark Waid, Leinil Francis Yu and Gerry Alanguilan.

Superman premiered at the TCL Chinese Theater on July 7, 2025, and was released by Warner Bros. Pictures in the United States on July 11. It is the first film in the DCU's Chapter One: Gods and Monsters. The film grossed $618.7 million worldwide, making it the tenth highest-grossing film of 2025, and received mostly positive reviews. Critics found it to be fun, colorful, and earnest, although some felt it was overstuffed, while the performances of Corenswet, Brosnahan, and Hoult were praised. A follow-up film, Man of Tomorrow, is scheduled for release in 2027, in addition to two spin-off television series featuring supporting characters from the film: The People v. Gorilla Grodd starring Skyler Gisondo as Jimmy Olsen and another for Gathegi's Michael Holt / Mister Terrific.

== Plot ==
After Clark Kent / Superman stops the nation of Boravia from invading the neighboring country of Jarhanpur and warns Boravian President Vasil Ghurkos to leave Jarhanpur alone, he is defeated for the first time by a metahuman called the "Hammer of Boravia" in Metropolis, and flees to his Fortress of Solitude in Antarctica with the help of the superpowered dog Krypto. They are followed by Angela Spica / The Engineer, an ally of tech billionaire Lex Luthor. Superman's robots use concentrated solar radiation to heal him and comfort Superman with a message from his birth parents, Jor-El and Lara Lor-Van, who sent him to Earth to save him from the destruction of their planet Krypton. The message was damaged during the journey, so only the first half can be played. Superman returns to Metropolis and is again beaten by the Hammer, who is secretly Luthor's metahuman Ultraman.

Superman agrees to be interviewed by Lois Lane, his girlfriend and reporter colleague at the Daily Planet, leading to an argument when Lois presses him on the legal and ethical implications of his actions in Boravia. Luthor unleashes a kaiju on Metropolis as a distraction while he infiltrates the Fortress with Ultraman and the Engineer, overpowering the robots, capturing Krypto, and discovering the Kryptonian message; the Engineer restores the damaged portion. Superman rescues civilians while fighting the kaiju with the "Justice Gang", a team composed of heroes Green Lantern, Mister Terrific, and Hawkgirl. Despite Superman wanting to take the creature alive, Mister Terrific kills it. Luthor broadcasts the Kryptonian message and Superman is shocked to hear the second half, in which his parents urge him to conquer Earth and take many wives to restore the Kryptonian race.

Public opinion turns against Superman, especially when he angrily confronts Luthor, looking for Krypto. Lois reassures Superman that she believes he is good, and he confesses his love for her before surrendering himself to the U.S. government. They hand him over to Luthor for detainment and questioning inside an artificial pocket universe where Luthor secretly holds his enemies, including Krypto. Superman is imprisoned with the metahuman Metamorpho. Luthor uses Metamorpho's infant son Joey as leverage to force him to transmute one of his hands into Kryptonite, rendering Superman powerless. During questioning, Luthor murders one of Superman's supporters, Malik Ali. A horrified Metamorpho agrees to help Superman escape, and they free Joey and Krypto. Lois convinces Mister Terrific to help find Superman and they enter the pocket universe, rescuing the others. Lois takes Superman to recuperate with his adoptive human parents, Jonathan and Martha Kent, and Jonathan tells the demoralized Superman that his choices and actions determine who he is, not the message from his birth parents.

Luthor's girlfriend Eve Teschmacher, who is infatuated with Daily Planet photographer Jimmy Olsen, provides him with evidence that Luthor is aiding Boravia in return for half of Jarhanpur's territory. Luthor imprisons her and lures Superman back to Metropolis by opening an unstable portal to the pocket universe, creating a rift in reality that splits the city in half. Superman sends Green Lantern, Hawkgirl, and Metamorpho to stop Boravia from invading Jarhanpur again. Hawkgirl kills Ghurkos and Green Lantern invites Metamorpho to join the Justice Gang. In Metropolis, Superman and Mister Terrific fight the Engineer and Ultraman. After Superman defeats the Engineer, he learns that Ultraman is a clone of himself created by Luthor. With Krypto's help, Superman defeats Ultraman and knocks him into a black hole beneath the rift. At Luthor's headquarters, Mister Terrific closes the rift. Luthor says he orchestrated the Jarhanpur conflict as an excuse to implicate Superman, driven by envy of his public admiration despite being an alien. Superman challenges his ideology, but Luthor remains defiant and is subdued by Krypto.

Lois and Jimmy expose Luthor's schemes to the public, clearing Superman's name. Luthor and his associates are arrested, and those trapped in his pocket universe, including Eve, are freed. Lois confesses that she loves Clark, too. As Superman recovers at the Fortress, his cousin Kara Zor-El drunkenly arrives to pick up Krypto. The robots comfort Superman with footage of his childhood on Earth with his human parents.

== Cast ==
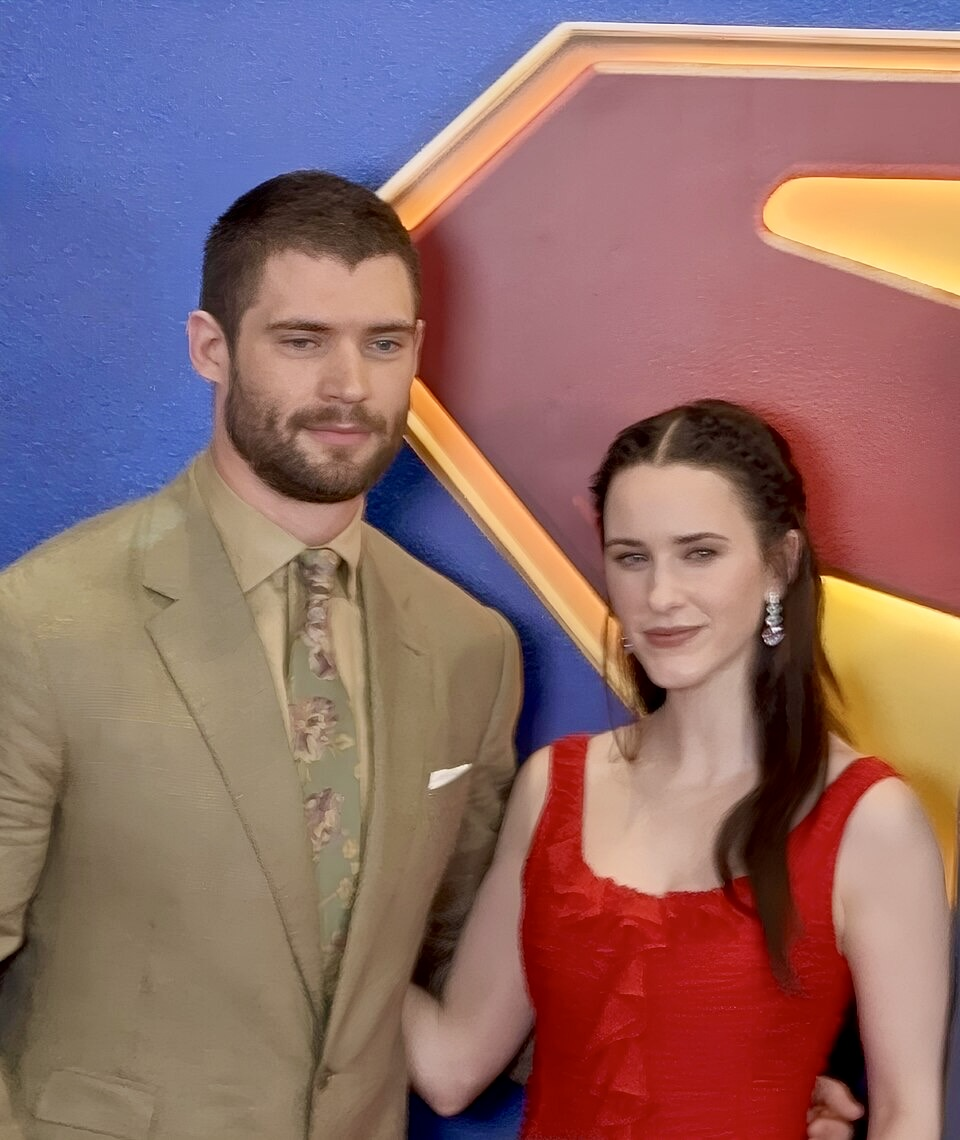
Superman stars David Corenswet (left) and Rachel Brosnahan (right) promoting the film in July 2025.

- David Corenswet as Kal-El / Clark Kent / Superman:
  A survivor from the destroyed planet Krypton who lives on Earth as a superhero. He maintains a separate identity at his day job, working as a journalist for the Daily Planet in Metropolis. Director James Gunn said Corenswet's Superman is around 25 years old, making him more established than Tom Welling's version from the CW series Smallville (2001–2011) but younger than Henry Cavill's version in the DC Extended Universe (DCEU). Producer Peter Safran described the film's take on the character for the DC Universe (DCU) as "the embodiment of truth, justice and the American way" and "kindness in a world that thinks of kindness as old-fashioned". Gunn said Clark is becoming successful as both a journalist and a superhero in the film, but new elements in his life leave him unbalanced. These include being "madly in love" with his colleague Lois Lane and making friends with other superheroes who think he is naive. The film illustrates how these elements influence Clark's values and choices, which are flawed and lead him on a personal journey. Corenswet differentiated Clark's roles in his interactions with his parents, his job at the Daily Planet, and as Superman. He described Superman as a "public facing character" who wants to present himself as calm yet authoritative. Corenswet drew inspiration for Clark from the comic book All-Star Superman (2005–2008) by Grant Morrison and Frank Quitely and the posture of Christopher Reeve's portrayal from the 1978–87 Superman film series. He was also inspired for Clark's voice and demeanor by his brother-in-law, whom he described as the "quietest, most wonderful man" despite his tall 6 feet 8 inches (2.03 metres) height and weighing 270 pounds, and described Clark as a "big presence" who is "desperately trying to be as small as possible and as quiet as possible". Gunn consulted DC Comics writer Tom King in relation to other characters' "suspension of disbelief" regarding Clark's dual identity, which was attributed to the use of hypnotic glasses to subtly distort his appearance. Gunn included this in the film, noting that it had "kind of been forgotten" from the comic book canon. Corenswet also portrays Ultraman, an armored clone of Superman created by Lex Luthor who masquerades as the "Hammer of Boravia" and is controlled via drones and voice prompts. Oliver Diego Silva portrays Clark at age two.
- Rachel Brosnahan as Lois Lane:
  A reporter for the Daily Planet who is a colleague of Clark, and "isn't so sure about him" and needs to be convinced about being in a relationship with him. Brosnahan described Lois as "fiercely intelligent" and feisty. She consulted with several journalists to help her portray Lois as a modern reporter.
- Nicholas Hoult as Lex Luthor:
  The CEO of LuthorCorp and the arch-nemesis of Superman, who hates Superman for having the power to do everything but not aligning with Luthor's own beliefs. Hoult described Luthor as obsessive, determined, and relentless, and wanted the character to feel like a credible threat to Superman. He has his end goal in sight and is motivated by a range of emotions, including a desire to be recognized for his scientific genius. Hoult was inspired by Michael Rosenbaum's Lex Luthor in Smallville and by billionaire Steve Jobs for Luthor's uniform, choosing to work out for the role based on the depiction of Luthor in All-Star Superman. Hoult's head was shaved by his son Joaquin in preparation for the role. Gunn took inspiration for the character from Brian Azzarello's limited comic book series Lex Luthor: Man of Steel (2005) as well as Jerry Siegel's "reckless scientific genius" version of Luthor in comic books from the 1950s and 1960s.
- Edi Gathegi as Michael Holt / Mister Terrific:
  A superhero and inventor who uses a variety of high-tech gadgets to fight crime, and is a member of the Justice Gang sponsored by Maxwell Lord. Gathegi described his character as an "atheist who believes in justice", and said Mister Terrific found meaning in "knowledge" after experiencing the death of his wife.
- Anthony Carrigan as Rex Mason / Metamorpho:
  An archaeologist and superhero who can "transmute elements in his body into various forms". He becomes a member of the Justice Gang. Carrigan said it was refreshing to play a superhero after previously portraying the Batman villain Victor Zsasz in the television series Gotham (2014–2019). He felt that he could bring some "authenticity and truth" to the role by comparing Metamorpho's concerns about his abilities to Carrigan's own alopecia.
- Nathan Fillion as Guy Gardner / Green Lantern:
  An abrasive galactic peacekeeper in the Green Lantern Corps, and a Justice Gang member, whom Fillion described as a fearless, overconfident jerk. Fillion drew inspiration for Guy speaking his mind with no filter from Estelle Getty's Sophia Petrillo in the sitcom The Golden Girls (1985–1992). Fillion referred back to the character's origin story, in which Guy was hit by a bus and sent into a coma, as what "flipped the switch" for his personality, making him "off a little bit". The film retains the character's "iconic bowl cut haircut" from the comics, which Fillion insisted on having despite some discussions about changing his hairstyle.
- Isabela Merced as Kendra Saunders / Hawkgirl:
  A superhero with wings and various melee weapons who is a Justice Gang member. She is reincarnated from an alien, retaining her memories and past trauma with a grumpy demeanor. Merced felt the self-awareness and comedic aspects of the film helped Hawkgirl "make light of [her] trauma". Merced's short 5 feet 1 inch (1.55 metres) height differentiates her from other DCU heroes. Merced felt that her role as Anya Corazón in the Sony's Spider-Man Universe (SSU) film Madame Web (2024) helped prepare her to play Hawkgirl, though she did not tell the Superman filmmakers about that role in case they did not want her to play both.

Skyler Gisondo plays Jimmy Olsen, a boyish young photographer who is Clark and Lois's closest colleague, while Wendell Pierce plays Daily Planet editor-in-chief Perry White. Pierce said Perry is "always grumpy" because Luthor had an affair with Perry's wife, and Perry's second child may actually be Luthor's, so Perry's driving force is wanting to get back at Luthor. The actor asked his friends for information on the character because he did not read comic books growing up. Other staff at the Daily Planet include Beck Bennett as reporter Steve Lombard; Mikaela Hoover as columnist Cat Grant; and Christopher McDonald as reporter Ron Troupe. Pruitt Taylor Vince and Neva Howell respectively play Jonathan and Martha Kent, Clark's adoptive human parents, and studied tapes of drummer and radio personality Richard Christy's parents to develop their Kansan accents for the film. Bradley Cooper, who previously collaborated with Gunn on his Guardians of the Galaxy films (2014–2023), and Angela Sarafyan respectively portray Superman's Kryptonian parents Jor-El and Lara Lor-Van. Of the Superman robots who aid Superman at the Fortress of Solitude, prior Gunn collaborators Alan Tudyk, Michael Rooker, and Pom Klementieff respectively voice "Four" (later named Gary), "One", and "Five", with Grace Chan as the voice of "Twelve". Gunn's wife Jennifer Holland is the uncredited voice of another robot at the end of the film. Dinesh Thyagarajan plays Malik "Mali" Ali, a falafel cart vendor who supports Superman. Dog actor Jolene stood-in for the superpowered dog Krypto, whom Gunn described as a "not-so-good-good-boy". The character was primarily created with visual effects, and was modeled after Gunn's dog Ozu.

Sara Sampaio portrays Eve Teschmacher, Luthor's assistant and girlfriend who is secretly involved with Jimmy. She felt comfortable performing with Hoult after working with him on a campaign for Armani. María Gabriela de Faría plays Angela Spica / The Engineer, an ally of Luthor whose abilities come from nanotechnology in her body. Her appearance was intended to help set up a planned film about the Authority, the team that she is a member of in the comics. Other allies of Luthor include Zlatko Burić as Vasil Ghurkos, the President of Boravia; Terence Rosemore and Stephen Blackehart as LuthorCorp employees Otis Berg and Sydney Happersen, respectively; and Trevor Newlin as the humanoid creature Mister Handsome. Gunn said Luthor created Mister Handsome when he was 12 and has "true sentiment" for the creature. Comedian Michael Ian Black plays Cleavis Thornwaite, host of the right-wing talk show The Sphere who runs a smear campaign against Superman, while James Hiroyuki Liao portrays General Mori, the U.S. Secretary of Defense.

Additionally, Frank Grillo reprises his role as A.R.G.U.S. director Rick Flag Sr. from the animated DCU series Creature Commandos (2024–present); Tinashe Kajese-Bolden reprises her role as A.R.G.U.S. member Flo Crawley, now the FBI director, from the DCEU film The Suicide Squad (2021); Milly Alcock has an uncredited cameo appearance as Superman's cousin Kara Zor-El / Supergirl ahead of her own film, Supergirl (2026); John Cena has an uncredited cameo appearance as Chris Smith / Peacemaker on a news show, mocking Superman, ahead of his role in the second season of Peacemaker (2025); and Gunn's brother Sean has a cameo appearance as billionaire Maxwell Lord, the head of LordTech and the corporate backer of the Justice Gang. Sean said they ignored past depictions of Lord when creating their version, including Peter Facinelli's portrayal in the Arrowverse series Supergirl (2015–2021) and Pedro Pascal's portrayal in the DCEU film Wonder Woman 1984 (2020). Other cameo appearances include ABC News correspondent Will Reeve, the son of Christopher Reeve, as a GBS News reporter; Michael Rosenbaum, who portrayed Luthor in Smallville, as the voice of one of Luthor's Raptor guards; and Louisa Krause in the non-speaking role of Sapphire Stagg, Metamorpho's wife.

== Production ==
=== Background ===
In 2012, Warner Bros. Pictures was planning for the film Man of Steel (2013), based on the DC Comics character Superman, to start a shared universe, which became known as the "DC Extended Universe" (DCEU). They announced a full slate of DC films in October 2014, prioritizing Batman v Superman: Dawn of Justice (2016) as the second DCEU film after Man of Steel failed to meet the studio's financial expectations. Despite this, they said an undated sequel to Man of Steel was in development with Henry Cavill set to reprise his role as Clark Kent / Superman. Man of Steel director Zack Snyder said they had been considering the imprisoned Kryptonians from the first film and the character Brainiac as antagonists for the sequel before work began on Batman v Superman. A Man of Steel sequel was in active development as a top priority for the studio in August 2016, which Cavill's manager Dany Garcia confirmed the following month. Amy Adams, who portrayed Lois Lane in Man of Steel, said in November that the studio was working on the screenplay. Matthew Vaughn was Warner Bros.'s top choice to direct the film and had preliminary conversations about it by March 2017. Vaughn and comic book writer Mark Millar previously pitched a new Superman trilogy before the development of Man of Steel, in which the destruction of the planet Krypton would not occur until after Superman had already grown up on the planet. After the troubled production of the DCEU film Justice League (2017), Warner Bros. reevaluated its approach to DC projects. By the end of 2017, a Man of Steel sequel was not coming "anytime soon, if at all". Justice League producer Charles Roven said story ideas had been discussed but there was no script.

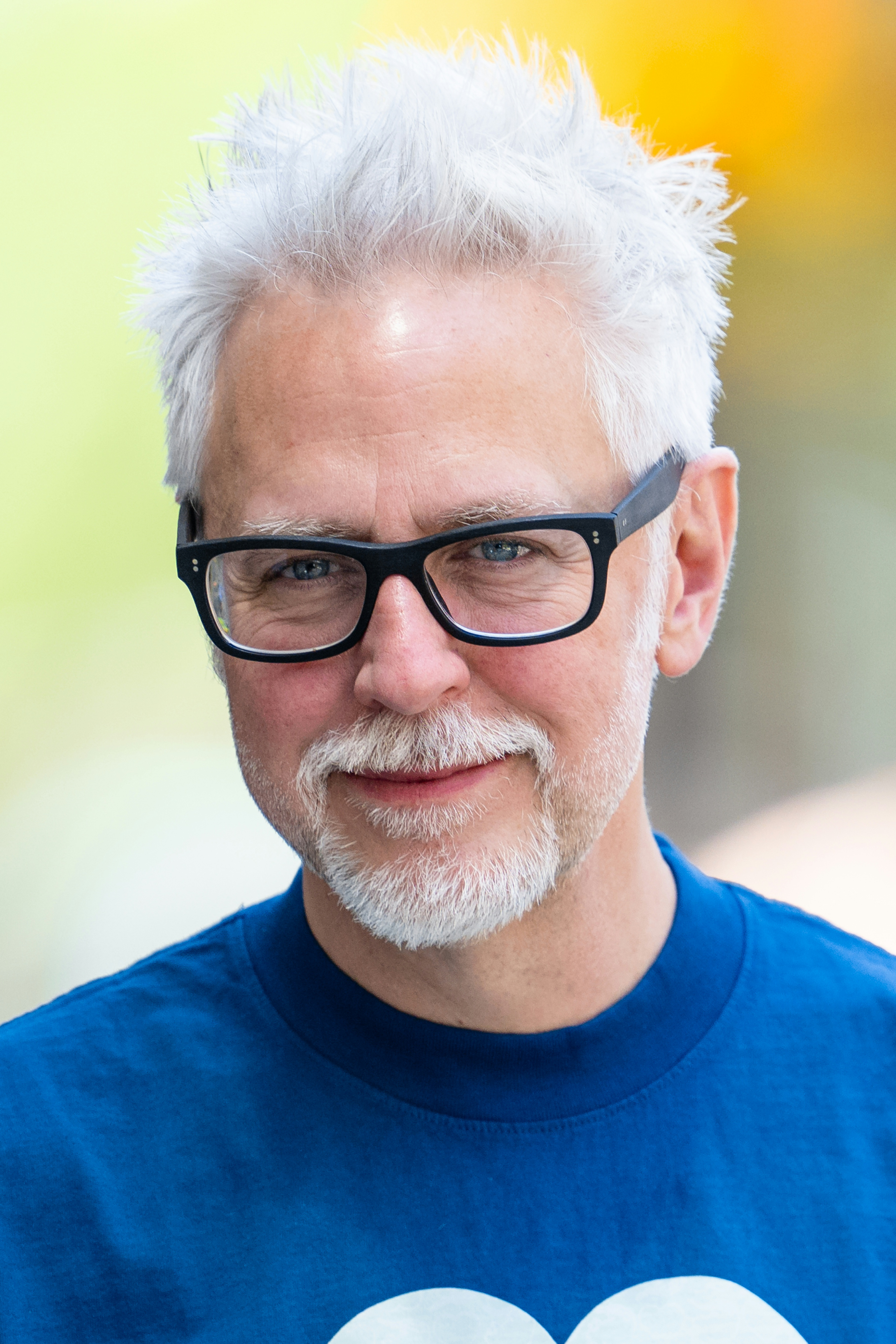
Writer and director James Gunn, pictured during filming in June 2024, began work on a new Superman film in August 2022, after turning down a previous opportunity.

Before the release of Mission: Impossible – Fallout in July 2018, director Christopher McQuarrie and co-star Cavill pitched their take on a new Superman film, partially inspired by the animated film Up (2009), but Warner Bros. did not pursue the idea. Later in 2018, the studio asked James Gunn to write and direct a Superman film, but he was uncertain if he wanted to take on the character. He did not have a clear vision, especially since Superman is a well-known character unlike the Guardians of the Galaxy whom he adapted for Marvel Studios in the film Guardians of the Galaxy (2014). Gunn chose to make The Suicide Squad (2021) instead, calling it "the easier path". In September, negotiations for Cavill to reprise his role for a cameo appearance in Shazam! (2019) ended due to contract issues, as well as a scheduling conflict with Cavill's Mission: Impossible commitments. Cavill was reported to be parting ways with the studio, with no plans for him to reprise his role in future projects, but Cavill said in November 2019 that he had not given up on the character and still wanted to do the role justice. At that time, Warner Bros. was unsure which direction to take the character and was talking to "high-profile talent" about the property, including J. J. Abrams—whose company Bad Robot signed an overall deal with Warner Bros.'s parent company WarnerMedia—and Michael B. Jordan, who pitched himself as a Black version of the character. By May 2020, Warner Bros. was no longer developing a Man of Steel sequel, but Cavill was in talks to appear in a different DC film. In February 2021, Ta-Nehisi Coates was revealed to be writing a new Superman film that Abrams was producing. The film was expected to feature a Black actor portraying Superman, with the potential for Jordan to take on the role.

=== Development ===
In April 2022, Discovery, Inc. and WarnerMedia merged to become Warner Bros. Discovery (WBD), led by president and CEO David Zaslav. The new company was expected to restructure DC Entertainment and Zaslav began searching for an equivalent to Marvel Studios president Kevin Feige to lead the new subsidiary. Zaslav and WBD felt DC lacked a "coherent creative and brand strategy" and were underusing Superman. Over the years, Gunn considered how he would approach Superman if he were ever given another opportunity, and around late August 2022 he was hired to work on a Superman film that was not a sequel to Man of Steel and would be standalone from the DCEU. Zaslav met with Gunn while he was writing the script.

Cavill made a cameo appearance in the post-credits scene of the DCEU film Black Adam, released in October 2022, and Warner Bros. was reportedly pursuing a Cavill-led Man of Steel sequel once again. Roven was producing and the studio was searching for writers. They wanted McQuarrie to direct, but he was unlikely to be available due to his commitments to the Mission: Impossible franchise. Coates's film was still in development. Cavill's role in Black Adam was approved by Warner Bros. film chiefs Michael De Luca and Pamela Abdy when they were approached directly by Black Adam star Dwayne Johnson, who began promoting the idea of co-starring with Cavill in a Black Adam vs. Superman film. Cavill signed a one-off deal for Black Adam and only received a verbal agreement that he would continue playing the character in the DCEU. Cavill publicly announced that he would return as Superman for future projects, and said his Black Adam cameo teased their plans for the character. He added that Superman would be "enormously joyful" moving forward. Steven Knight wrote a script treatment for the sequel around that time, which reportedly included Brainiac as the antagonist, but Warner Bros. executives were not thrilled with his take. Michael Bay was eyed to potentially direct the film.

Writer and director James Gunn took specific inspiration from the comic book series All-Star Superman (2005–2008) by Grant Morrison and Frank Quitely. He included the cover art for the comic's first issue (pictured) in the film's announcement.

Gunn and The Suicide Squad producer Peter Safran were announced as the co-chairs and co-CEOs of the newly formed DC Studios at the end of October 2022. A week after starting their new roles, the pair had begun developing an eight-to-ten-year plan for a new DC Universe (DCU) that would be a "soft reboot" of the DCEU. Andy Muschietti, the director of the DCEU film The Flash (2023), expressed interest in directing a Superman project with a similar tone to director Richard Donner's film Superman (1978). In early November, Cavill expressed interest in a future project that explored Superman's "capacity to give and to love" the people of Earth and to inspire others, and said he was looking forward to meeting with Gunn to discuss future opportunities. Work on the Man of Steel sequel stalled later that month while Gunn and Safran were developing their plans, at which point Gunn was publicly revealed to be writing a new DC film. In December, Gunn said Superman was one of the top priorities for DC Studios, before publicly announcing that he was writing a new Superman film. The film was set to focus on a younger version of the character and would therefore not star Cavill. There was potential for Gunn to direct the film as well. It would not retell the origin of Superman, and would focus on him as a young reporter interacting with key characters such as Lois Lane. Gunn and Safran met with Cavill to explain their decision and discuss potentially working with him for a different role in the future.

In January 2023, Gunn and Safran unveiled the first projects from their DCU slate, which began with Chapter One: Gods and Monsters. Their Superman film was the first film in that chapter and was officially titled Superman: Legacy. It was given a release date of July 11, 2025, which coincides with the birthday of Gunn's late father. Safran wanted Gunn to direct the film. Gunn said Superman: Legacy would take specific inspiration from the comic book All-Star Superman (2005–2008) by Grant Morrison and Frank Quitely. The film was also inspired by the Superman animated shorts (1941–1943) and Superman: The Animated Series (1996–2000), and by other comics books such as: Superman: Birthright (2003–04); the "Brainiac" story arc (2008); Superman: Ending Battle (2002); Superman for All Seasons (1998); Kingdom Come (1996); Morrison's Action Comics run; and "Whatever Happened to the Man of Tomorrow?" (1986). Gunn considered using Brainiac as the antagonist for the film. He ultimately sought to "balance what was classic and what was completely new", and chose to incorporate imagery and aesthetics from the Silver Age of Comic Books alongside "authentic" storytelling that was focused on Superman's character. Gunn also cited the kaiju film Godzilla Minus One (2023) as an inspiration in regards to the humanity of the characters as well as the depiction of the giant monster that attacks Metropolis.

DCU writer Tom King said in March 2023 that Gunn was also directing the film, which Gunn confirmed later that month. At that time, Safran was confirmed to be producing the film with Gunn, doing so through their respective production companies, the Safran Company and Troll Court Entertainment. Gunn was hesitant to direct the film, despite encouragement from Safran and others, until he realized how focusing on Superman's heritage with his aristocratic Kryptonian parents and adoptive farmer parents from Smallville, Kansas, would inform the characterization. Gunn felt emotionally connected to this aspect of the film because of his late father. He said in April that the film's tone would differ from his Guardians of the Galaxy films (2014–2023), and he suggested that Superman's dog Krypto could appear.

=== Pre-production ===
==== Before and during the 2023 labor strikes ====
Production design, costume design, and casting began in April 2023. Production designer Beth Mickle and costume designer Judianna Makovsky returned from The Suicide Squad and Gunn's Guardians of the Galaxy Vol. 3 (2023). Filming was set to begin in January 2024. Gunn said the character Jimmy Olsen would appear. He did not intend for the film to be a comedy and intended for it to differ from previous Superman films while respecting what came before. Gunn completed the first draft of the script at the end of April. Production was not expected to be impacted by the 2023 Writers Guild of America strike when it began in early May.

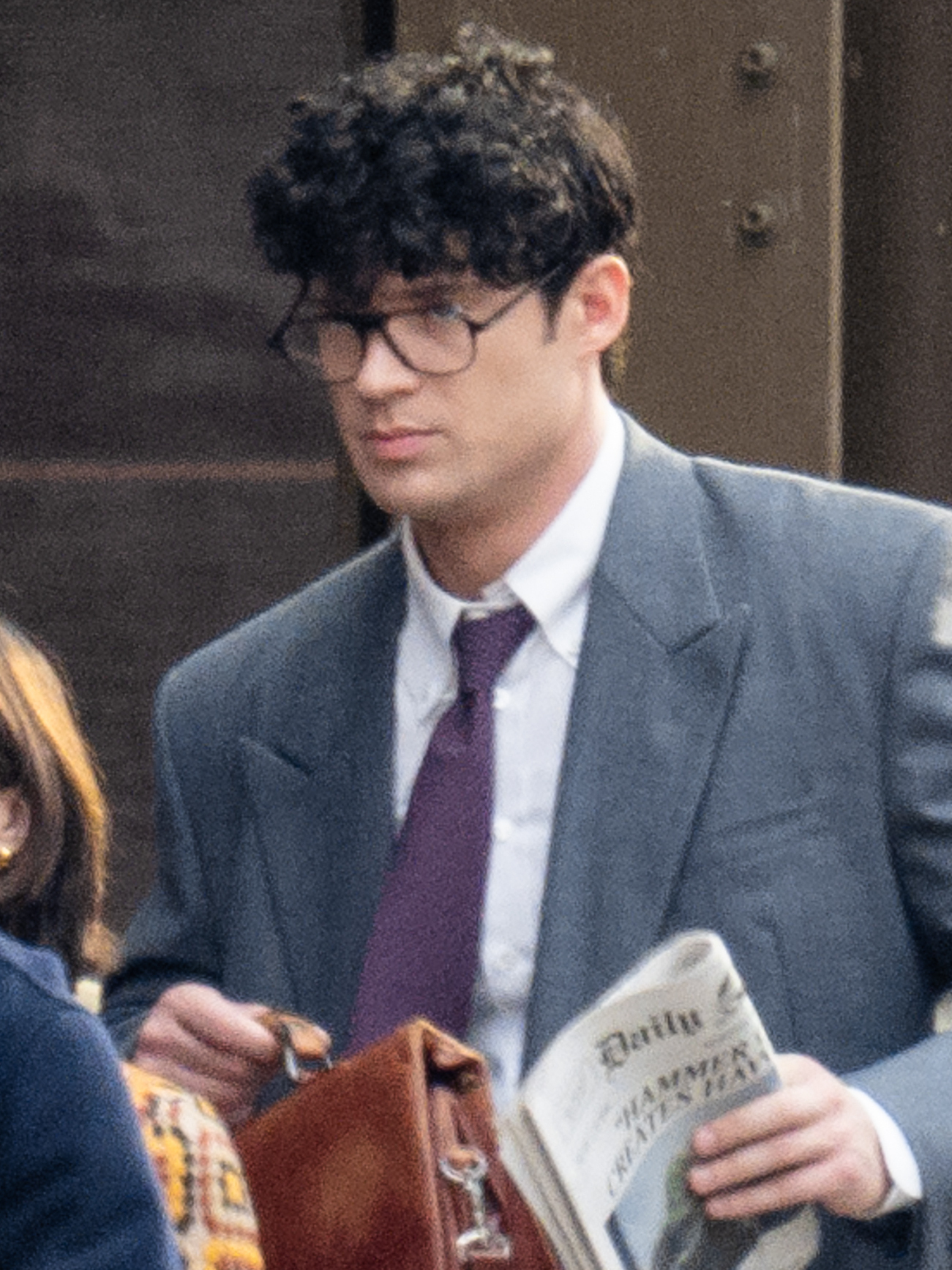
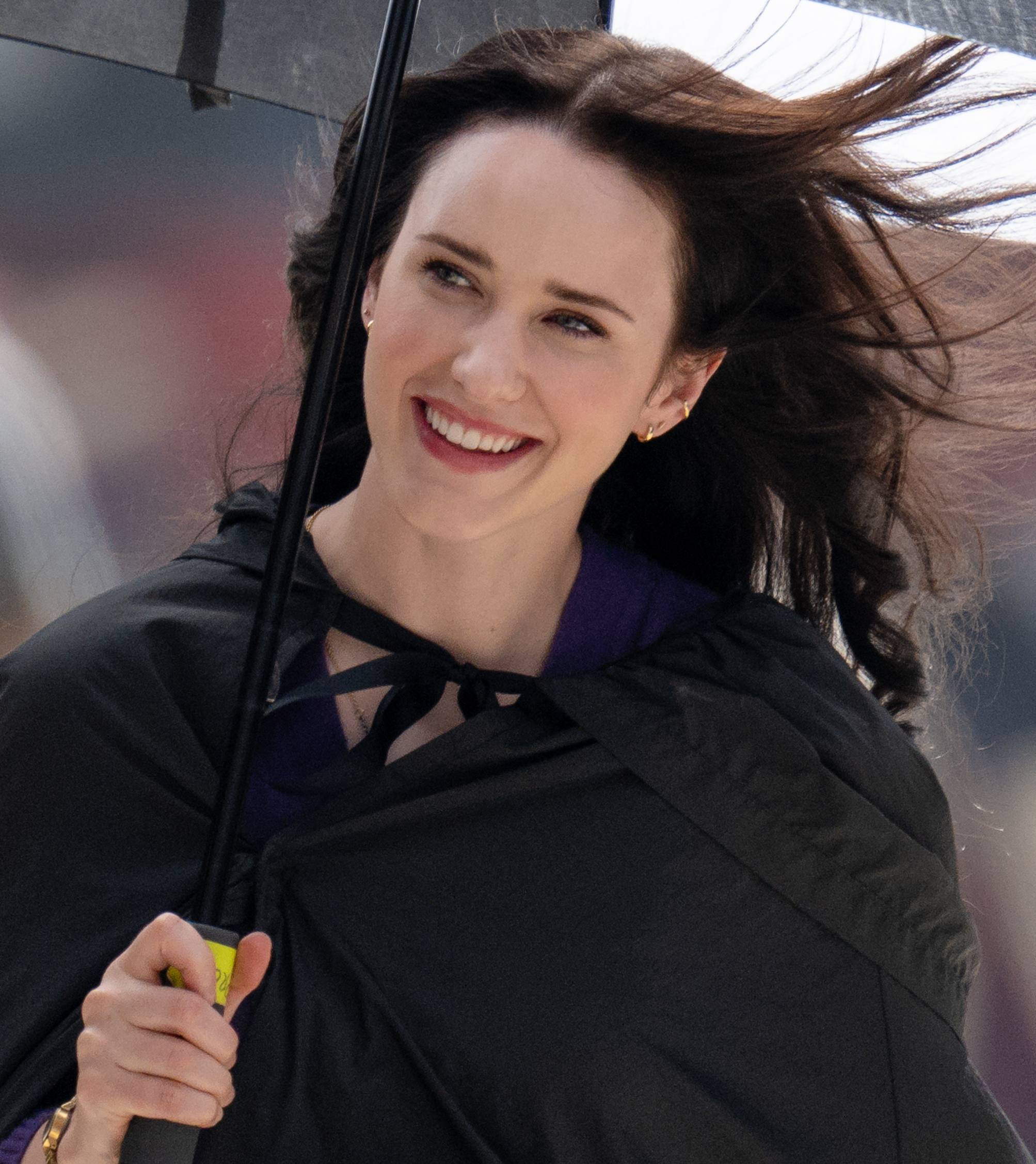
Superman stars David Corenswet (top) and Rachel Brosnahan (bottom) during filming in June 2024

Gunn was looking for an actor to play Superman who possessed the character's humanity, kindness, and compassion, and was "somebody who you want to give a hug". Audition tapes for the main roles of Superman, Lois Lane, and Lex Luthor were submitted by early May. Gunn began watching them later that month, while he was storyboarding the film. At this point, Gunn watched the film Pearl (2022) and David Corenswet's performance in it stood out to him. Corenswet had previously expressed his desire to portray Superman and his audition was one of the first Gunn saw. Corenswet became a top contender for Superman and was set to do a screen test by early June. Jacob Elordi, Tom Brittney, and Andrew Richardson were also in consideration, though Elordi declined to read for the role. Patrick Schwarzenegger, the Arrowverse series Supergirl (2015–2021) guest star Pierson Fodé, and Jack Quaid—the voice of Superman in the animated series My Adventures with Superman (2023–present)—all submitted self-tapes for Superman.

Emma Mackey, Rachel Brosnahan, Samara Weaving, and Phoebe Dynevor tested for Lane; Dynevor was one of the final contenders. Brosnahan made an audition tape with her husband Jason Ralph, who read Superman's lines. Nicholas Hoult, the runner-up to play Bruce Wayne / Batman in the standalone DC film The Batman (2022), was eyed for Luthor but chose to pursue the role of Superman instead, because he felt while he could play Luthor well, he insisted himself to focus on auditioning for Superman. Gunn considered A-list actors he had already worked with for Luthor, and briefly discussed the role with Guardians of the Galaxy Vol. 3 star Bradley Cooper while promoting it around that time. Other superheroes were expected to be established in the film's setting, and testing took place for Black actors to play Michael Holt / Mister Terrific, using the label "Apex", a reference to a comic version of Luthor called Apex Luthor.

In-person screen tests took place at the Warner Bros. Studios lot in Burbank, California, with Gunn and Safran in mid-June 2023. The actors tested in makeup and costume as Kent and Lane in the following pairs: Hoult and Brosnahan, Brittney and Dynevor, and Corenswet and Mackey. The Kent contenders then tested in costume as Superman against Mackey. One of Cavill's original DCEU Superman suits, which was in poor condition, was used for the tests. Gunn said Brittney "messed it up" and then it was "torn to shreds" by Corenswet, who was too tall. Gunn edited the tests together to be played for a deciding committee that included Zaslav, and the casting of Corenswet as Superman and Brosnahan as Lane was announced on June 27. Gunn personally contacted the actors to inform them of their castings, and he offered the role of Superman to Corenswet while he was filming Twisters (2024) on the condition that he treat everyone involved in the film with kindness and respect, citing his experiences with Chris Pratt (Peter Quill / Star-Lord in the Marvel Cinematic Universe) and John Cena (Christopher Smith / Peacemaker in the DCEU) doing the same.

Casting for other roles was set to follow, including for members of the superhero team the Authority, who were expected to be introduced in Superman: Legacy ahead of a planned film about the team. Brothers Alexander and Bill Skarsgård were on the shortlist for Luthor. It was unclear whether Hoult would return to try for Luthor again, but Gunn later contacted Hoult about playing Luthor, which he accepted after realizing he was better suited for the role. Corenswet and Brosnahan each earned $750,000 for their roles, while Hoult was the highest-paid actor in Superman, earning $2 million. They were all eligible for bonuses based on the film's box office performance. Gunn was paid $15 million for his work on Superman, in addition to his seven-figure salary for his role at DC Studios.

On July 11, 2023, the casting of Isabela Merced, Edi Gathegi, and Nathan Fillion, respectively, as the superheroes Kendra Saunders / Hawkgirl, Mister Terrific, and Guy Gardner / Green Lantern was announced. Merced tested as Barbara Gordon / Batgirl for the unreleased DCEU film Batgirl, while Fillion starred in several of Gunn's earlier films including as Cory Pitzner / T.D.K. in The Suicide Squad and had previously voiced fellow Green Lantern Hal Jordan in several animated projects. Gathegi was cast over 200 other actors. Anthony Carrigan, who expressed interest in playing Luthor, was cast as the superhero Rex Mason / Metamorpho the next day. Gunn chose some of these actors some time earlier but had been waiting until Superman and Lane were cast before negotiating further actor deals, leaving little time to complete negotiations before the 2023 SAG-AFTRA strike began on July 14. In response to concerns that other superheroes would take away from the story of Superman and Lane, Gunn said those two characters remained the film's focus and the other actors were being cast for multiple DCU projects. He later elaborated that a large cast of characters was included in the film because he wanted to explore Clark Kent's interactions with his colleagues and Superman's interactions with other superheroes, and show how those groups impact the character's values and choices.

==== Post-labor strikes ====
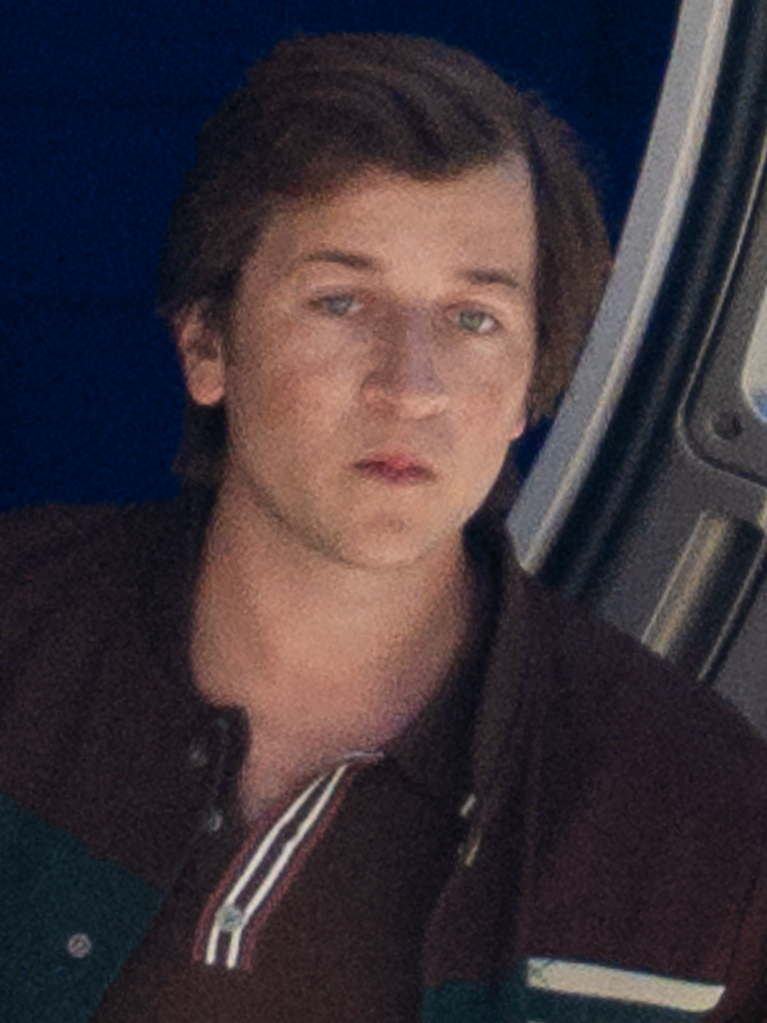
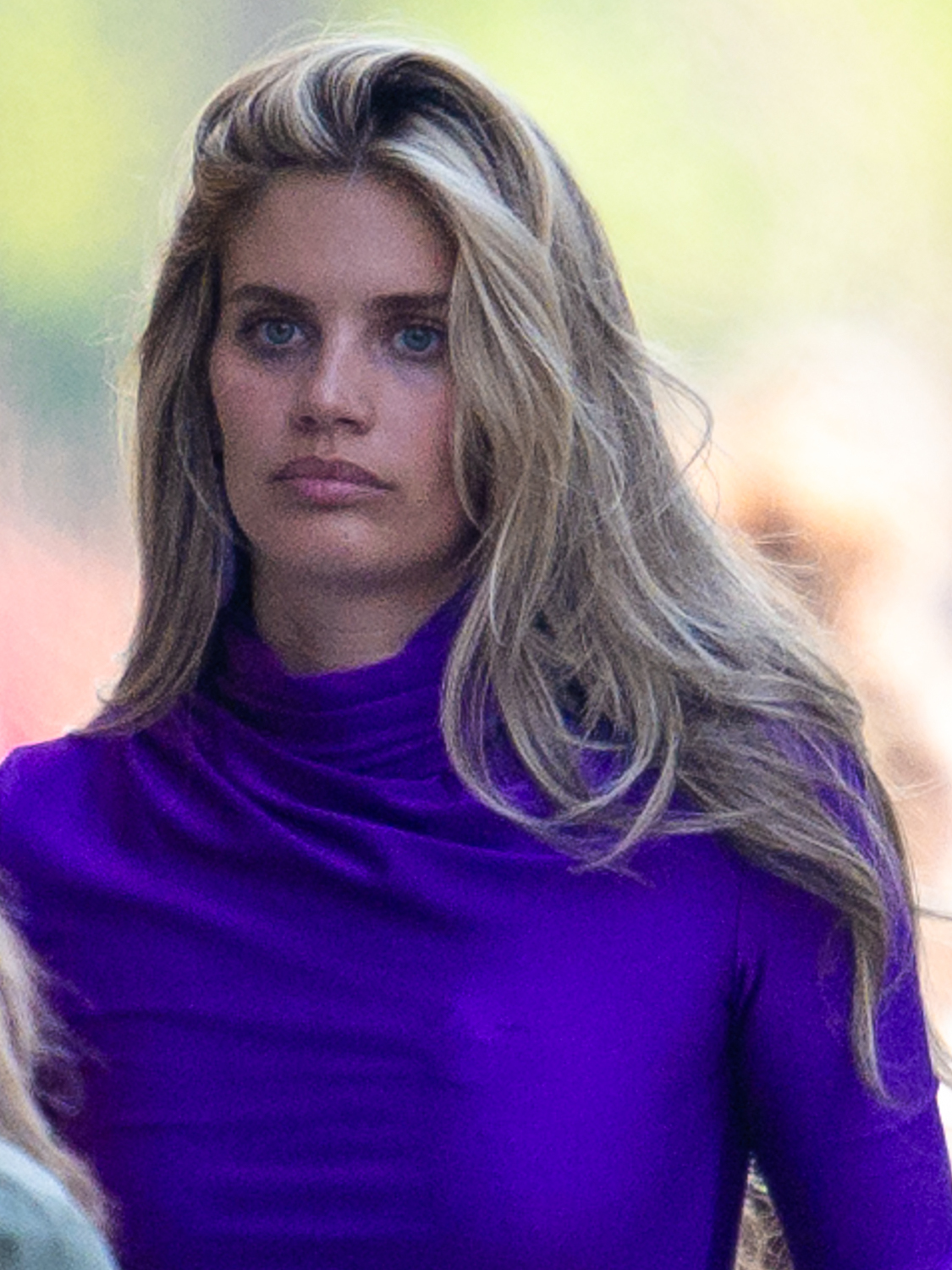
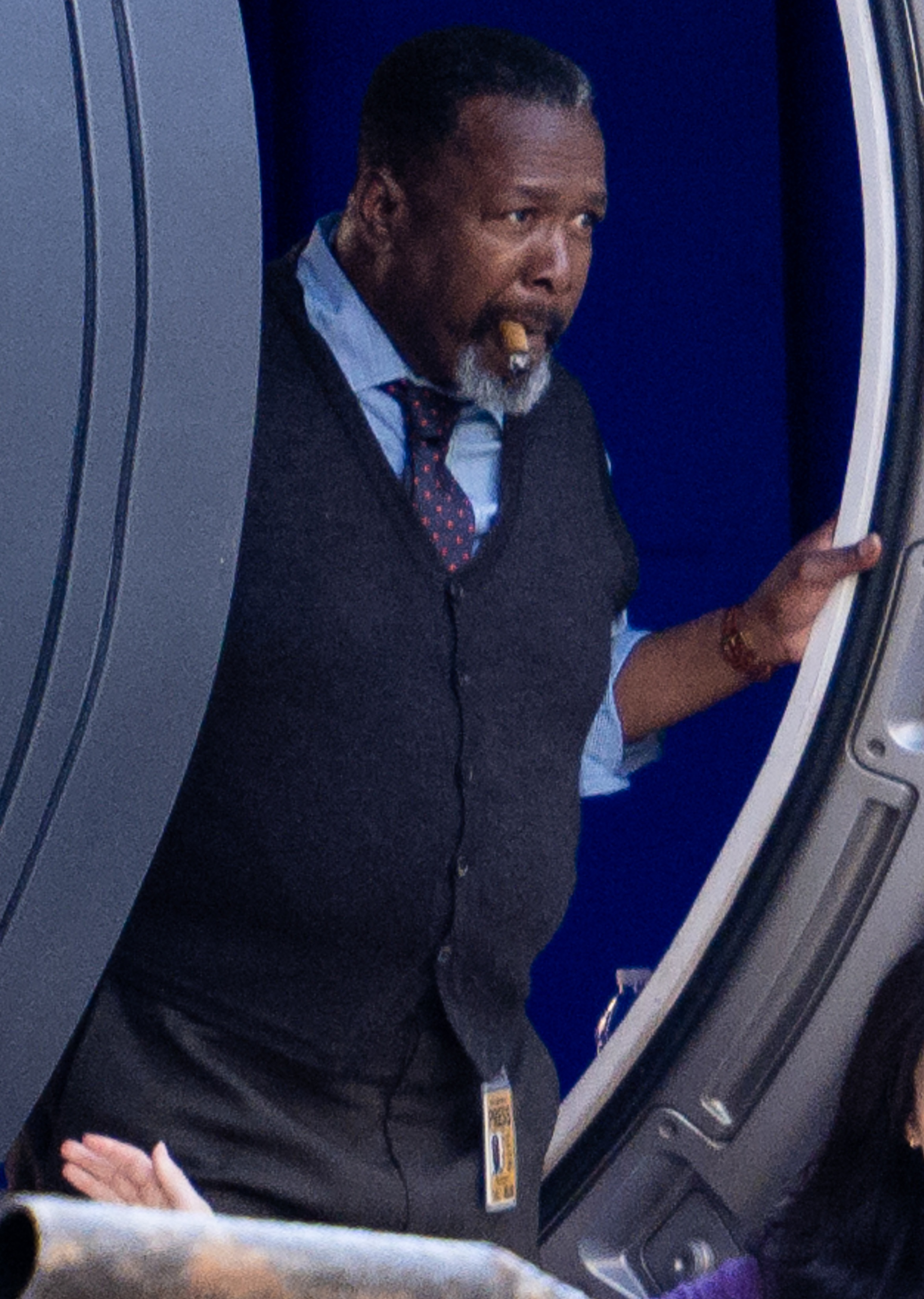
Superman supporting cast members Skyler Gisondo (left), Sara Sampaio (center), and Wendell Pierce (right) during filming in June 2024

When the WGA strike ended in September 2023, Superman: Legacy was expected to begin filming in early-to-mid 2024. Jason Momoa, who portrayed Aquaman in the DCEU, was reported the following month to have discussed portraying the character Lobo in either this film or a solo film; he was later cast in that role for the DCU film Supergirl (2026), originally titled Supergirl: Woman of Tomorrow. The SAG-AFTRA strike ended on November 9, and filming was clarified to be beginning in March 2024. Gunn said the film would still make its July 2025 release date. María Gabriela de Faría was revealed to be cast as Angela Spica / The Engineer, one of the film's antagonists and a member of the Authority, in mid-November. Madison Beer said she submitted a self-tape and unsuccessfully auditioned for a role, as did O'Shea Jackson Jr. Hoult was in talks to portray Luthor prior to the SAG-AFTRA strike, and negotiations for the role were continuing in November, when Skyler Gisondo and Sara Sampaio were revealed to have been respectively cast as Jimmy Olsen and Luthor's assistant Eve Teschmacher. Gunn said Gisondo, Sampaio, and de Faría had been cast prior to the strike, and the roles of Mister Terrific and Teschmacher were particularly difficult to cast and required many auditions.

In December 2023, Gunn's brother Sean was cast as Maxwell Lord for future DCU projects, after Pedro Pascal played the role in the DCEU film Wonder Woman 1984 (2020). The character was expected to be referenced in Superman: Legacy but it was unknown if he would appear in the film. James Gunn confirmed that Hoult had finalized a deal to portray Luthor, and Miriam Shor entered negotiations for an undisclosed role after appearing in Guardians of the Galaxy Vol. 3. The Hollywood Reporter also said the cast included Sean Gunn and Pom Klementieff, who starred in the Guardians of the Galaxy films, before James Gunn stated that Klementieff was not involved in the film and Shor had not been cast. He added that the film's script had been mostly completed before the writers' strike. Gunn said in January that work on the sets, prosthetics, and visual effects models were underway, the costumes were being completed, and most of the actors had been cast. Brosnahan said the film was being made with a lot of love for the source material, as many cast and crew members had grown up watching Superman films and reading the comics. At the end of the month, Milly Alcock was cast as Superman's cousin Kara Zor-El / Supergirl. The character was reported to be making her debut in Superman: Legacy ahead of starring in her own DCU film, Supergirl: Woman of Tomorrow. Alcock had performed auditions and screen tests in costume on the Superman: Legacy set in Atlanta, Georgia, earlier in January.

Pre-production work in Ohio began in early February 2024, with the Ohio Department of Development announcing that Superman: Legacy would be partially filmed in Cleveland and Cincinnati. The film was awarded over $11 million through the state's tax credit program, based on a $37 million spend in the state out of the film's reported total gross production budget of $363.8 million; Gunn disputed the accuracy of this budget, which would have made it one of the most expensive superhero films ever made. The film was later reported to have a net production budget of $225 million with incentives and tax breaks factored in. Also in February, Bassem Youssef said he had been cast in the film—reportedly as Rumaan Harjadi, the leader of a fictional Middle Eastern country—but his character was removed from the script. He believed this was potentially due to comments he made in October 2023 criticizing the Israeli government during the Gaza war. Gunn disputed this, explaining that he discussed a role with Youssef before the WGA strike, but the actor had not been formally offered the part, and the character was removed after the strike ended and before Youssef's comments were made. A table read with the cast was held on February 22, and Gunn revealed that Terence Rosemore was portraying Luthor's henchman Otis Berg after having small roles in some of Gunn's prior films. Zaslav said filming would begin the following week, when Gunn announced that he had shortened the film's title to Superman. He had come to feel while writing the film that it was about looking forward while the Legacy subtitle was about looking backward.

=== Filming ===
Principal photography began on February 29, 2024, which is Superman's birthday in the comic books. Filming took place in the Adventdalen valley in Svalbard, Norway, for one week to shoot scenes featuring the Fortress of Solitude. Gunn chose Svalbard for its natural beauty, landscapes, and similarities to Antarctica, where the Fortress is located. Filming occurred under the working title Genesis. Henry Braham returned as cinematographer from the later two Guardians of the Galaxy films, The Suicide Squad, and The Flash. The entire film was shot using IMAX certified Red Digital Cinema cameras. Filming was delayed from an initial January 2024 start by the SAG-AFTRA strike, and was expected to last around four months. Effects studio Legacy Effects worked on the film's practical effects, contributing character designs, prosthetic makeup, specialty suits, and animatronics.

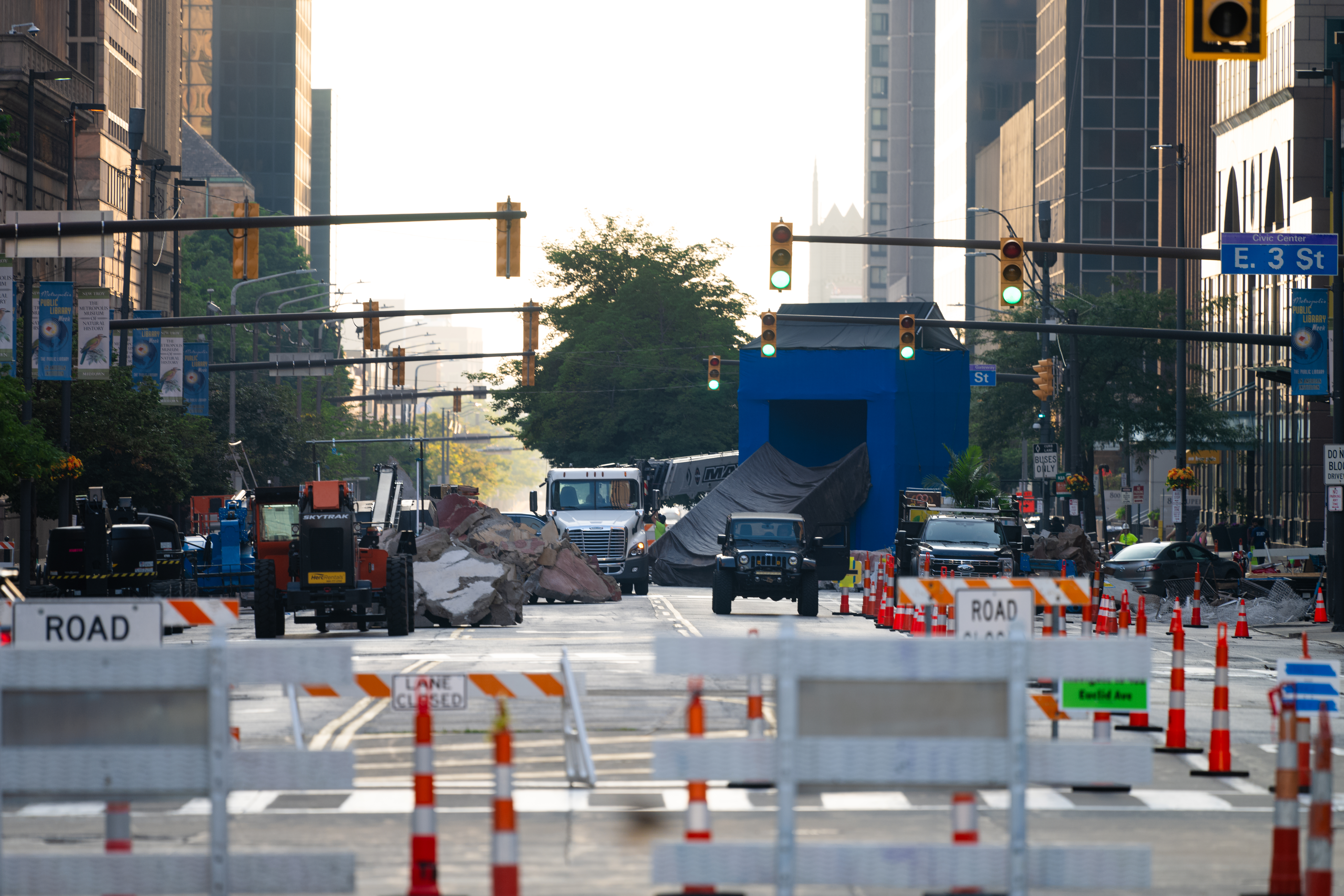
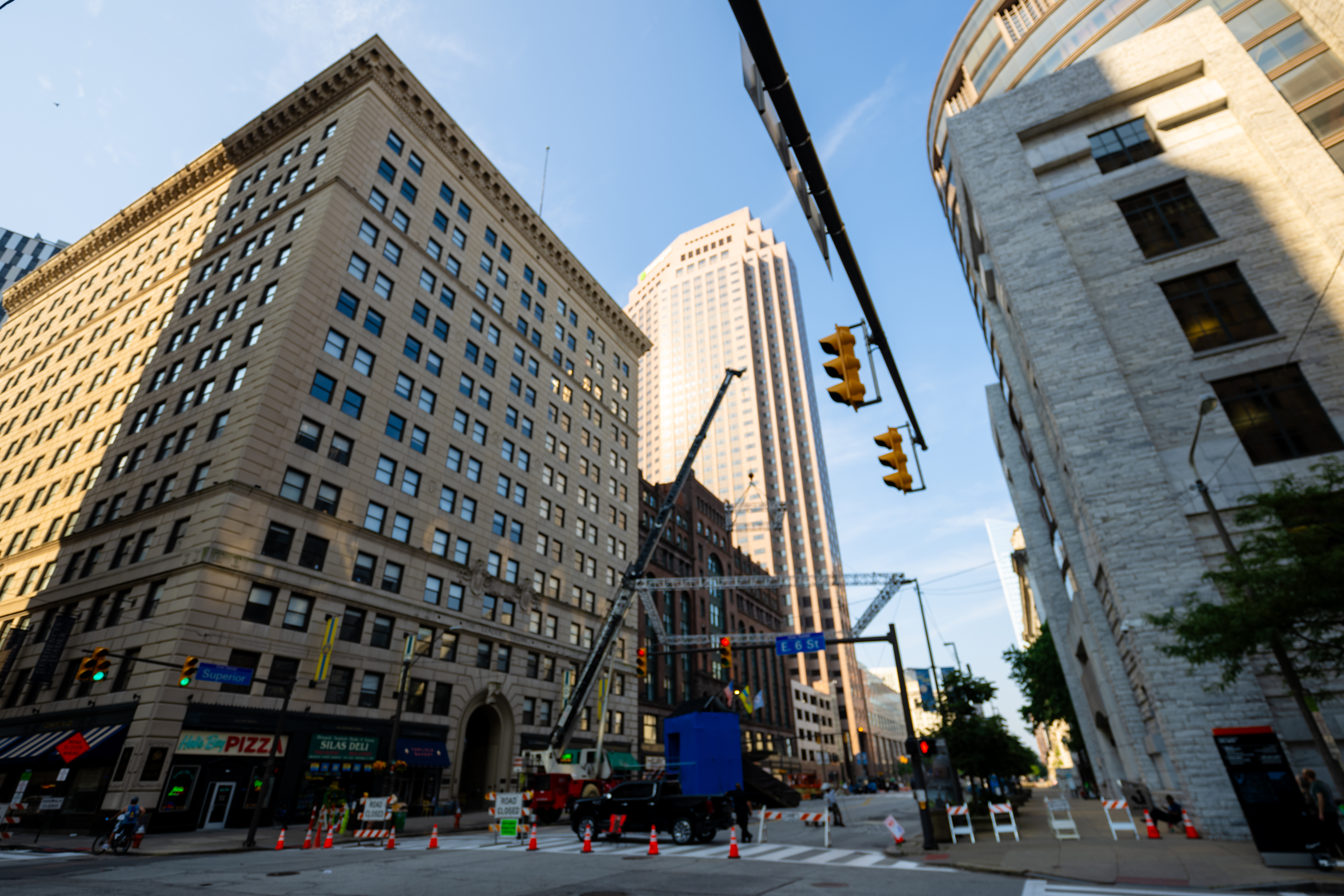
Set construction during location filming in Cleveland in June 2024

Wendell Pierce was cast as Perry White at the start of March. Filming at Trilith Studios in Atlanta, Georgia, had begun by March 8, while filming in Cleveland and Cincinnati was set to take 37 days between April 1 and August 23. Filming was also expected to take place in Macon, Georgia. In April, Pruitt Taylor Vince and Neva Howell were cast as Jonathan and Martha Kent, while Beck Bennett, Mikaela Hoover, and newcomer Christopher McDonald were cast as Daily Planet employees Steve Lombard, Cat Grant, and Ron Troupe in June. Hoover previously appeared in several of Gunn's films. Corenswet and Brosnahan filmed a 12-minute interview scene together, which Gunn described as ten percent of the film shot in two days, and highlighted their chemistry as "palpable". The 1940 film His Girl Friday was a major reference for depicting their relationship as "equal match[es]" for each other with a "longing romance" and witty comedy inspired by the works of Preston Sturges. Characters from the first season of the animated DCU series Creature Commandos (2024–25) were expected to appear in the film, and Gunn and Safran intended for the same actors to portray characters across animation and live-action in the DCU; set photos revealed that Frank Grillo was reprising his role as Rick Flag Sr. from that series.

The production moved to Northeast Ohio on June 14, when filming took place at the Headlands Beach State Park in Mentor, Ohio. Six weeks of filming took place throughout Cleveland, beginning in downtown Cleveland on June 24. Filming locations included Ontario Street, the Cleveland Greyhound Station, Public Square, the Detroit–Superior Bridge, PNC Plaza, Progressive Field, and Cleveland Arcade. Exterior shots of the Huntington Bank Building, Key Tower, and the Soldiers' and Sailors' Monument were filmed in Public Square. The exterior of the Leader Building stood in for the headquarters of the Daily Planet, and Key Tower was used as the headquarters for Stagg Enterprises. Filming in Cleveland was completed on July 16, when Gunn said there were a couple weeks left of shooting. The production moved to Cincinnati by July 18, taking place at the Cincinnati Museum Center in Union Terminal and in the Lytle Tunnel. Filming wrapped on July 30.

=== Post-production ===
In August 2024, Sean Gunn confirmed his casting as Maxwell Lord for the film. The following month, Alan Tudyk was revealed to have a role in the film after voicing several characters in Creature Commandos; Tudyk voices the Superman robot "Four". Comic book writer Mark Waid revealed that Krypto was appearing in the film, which Gunn officially confirmed in October. He explained that the character's portrayal was inspired by his dog Ozu, who was adopted soon after Gunn began writing Superman, and said Ozu was at first "problematic to say the least... I remember thinking, 'Gosh, how difficult would life be if Ozu had superpowers?'—and thus Krypto came into the script and changed the shape of the story".

"'How can you take a character like this, who's perceived as old-fashioned by many? There have been so many different permutations of the character throughout the years, so how could you do it for a modern audience?' I knew what I wanted to do in creating a story that was both utterly human and utterly fantastic... It [has] all the fantastic elements that we've never really seen in a Superman movie: the flying dog, the giant Kaiju, pocket universes, science and sorcery, and all these things that were in the old Max Fleischer cartoons."

— Writer and director James Gunn discussing the film in April 2025

Gunn began test screening the film by the start of December. A day-and-a-half of individual pick-up shots were scheduled to take place in Los Angeles shortly after, which Gunn said was to "enhance the film" rather than reshoot any scenes. Alcock was confirmed to be appearing in the film in January 2025. Three days of pick-ups had also taken place in Atlanta by the end of May, and Gunn said the film was completed and received a picture lock on June 5. Later that month, Michael Rooker and Klementieff were confirmed to have voiced two Superman robots alongside Cooper and Angela Sarafyan as Superman's Kryptonian parents Jor-El and Lara Lor-Van. William Hoy and Craig Alpert co-edited the film, after they respectively worked on the DC films The Batman and Blue Beetle (2023).

Much of the visual effects team from Guardians of the Galaxy Vol. 3 returned to work with Gunn on Superman, including visual effects supervisor Stéphane Ceretti. Visual effects were provided by Framestore, Industrial Light & Magic (ILM), and Wētā FX. The film features 1,766 visual effects shots. Framestore created Krypto and shared the asset with ILM and Wētā because each studio had Krypto shots to deliver. Framestore also worked on the Fortress of Solitude. ILM scanned the practical build of the Hammer of Boravia, built by Legacy, and developed the full CG version. ILM created Metropolis with New York City as the reference point for scale, style, and density, and used shots filmed in Cleveland to become part of Metropolis. Wētā created the kaiju creature and used ILM's asset of Metropolis for the kaiju fight sequence. The VFX team created a digital version of Cleveland Public Square so that Wētā could make shots that required extensive camera work that could not be achieved with drones, and also created all the interactions of the kaiju with the environment.

== Music ==
In December 2023, Gunn said most of the film's score and major themes had been written, but the composer had not been announced because their deal had not been finalized. In February 2024, he announced that John Murphy was composing the score after doing so for The Suicide Squad, The Guardians of the Galaxy Holiday Special (2022), and Guardians of the Galaxy Vol. 3. In December, Gunn confirmed that Murphy was using a new version of John Williams's "Superman March" theme from the 1978 Superman film. Gunn considered Williams's score to be one of the greatest of all time and had associated his theme with Superman from the start of the film's development. He saw the theme's inclusion as one way for the film to harken back to past iterations. Unlike other projects by Gunn, Superman only features two licensed songs; "Punkrocker" by Teddybears & Iggy Pop, and "5 Years Time" by Noah and the Whale. In April 2025, David Fleming was revealed to be contributing some music and sharing credit for the score with Murphy. The end credits features the original song, "The Mighty Crabjoys Theme", which Gunn wrote with the Foxy Shazam rock band members Eric Nally and Devin Williams.

== Marketing ==
Promotional image which revealed star David Corenswet in costume as Superman for the first time

For the January 2023 announcement, Gunn used the cover art of All-Star Superman's first issue to represent the film. He also posted the cover on social media in March when confirming that he would direct the film. Gunn marked the beginning of filming in February 2024 by posting a picture of Superman's logo, which commentators noted for its visual similarity to the character's costume in the Kingdom Come comic book, albeit with the classic yellow and red color scheme. Safran promoted the film on-stage during Warner Bros.'s CinemaCon presentation in April, with Gunn, Corenswet, and Brosnahan appearing via video messages. The panel unveiled a full look at the Superman emblem, and Gunn said he planned to attend the following year's event in-person with the cast to initiate a "Summer of Superman". Gunn released a first-look image of Corenswet in costume in early May, which depicts Superman suiting up while an alien-looking threat attacks in the background. Commentary on the image focused on the return of red briefs, which were absent from the Man of Steel design. Elements of the costume were also compared to Jim Lee's design used in DC Comics' 2011 New 52 initiative. The character's pose and the attack in the background sparked speculation about Superman's characterization in the film and the threats he may face. A display inspired by the film's Fortress of Solitude was included at Warner Bros.'s Licensing Expo booth in Las Vegas later in May.

Gunn released the first image of Krypto, alongside Corenswet's Superman, in October 2024 in honor of "Adopt a Shelter Dog" month. A motion poster was released on December 16 featuring a slowed-down rendition of John Williams's "Superman March" with an electric guitar opening. Jordan Moreau at Variety described the poster as an homage to Christopher Reeve's portrayal of Superman in the 1978 film but with quieter, "more thoughtful" music. A teaser trailer was shown at a press screening that day ahead of a public release on December 19. The trailer had over 250 million global views in its first 24 hours, making it the most-viewed and discussed trailer for a DC Comics or Warner Bros. film in that time period. WaterTower Music released Murphy's music for the trailer as a single, titled "Theme from Superman (Trailer Version)", later that day. Animal Planet's Puppy Bowl XXI on Super Bowl Sunday in February 2025 was co-sponsored by the film, with Gunn and Ozu appearing to introduce new footage. A "Krypto Super Play" award was presented to one of the puppies participating in the game. At the end of the month, DC Studios hired Ricky Strauss, a former marketing executive at Apple TV+ and Disney, to consult on the film's marketing following the exit of Warner Bros. global marketing chief Josh Goldstine the prior month. Safran said Zaslav had "rallied the entire company" behind the film in a similar way to previous successful Warner Bros. films such as Barbie (2023).

Gunn, Corenswet, Brosnahan, and Hoult promoted the film during Warner Bros.'s CinemaCon panel in April 2025, where an extended sequence and new behind-the-scenes footage were shown. The extended footage was later released online and shown before IMAX screenings for the Warner Bros. film A Minecraft Movie, while the behind-the-scenes footage was released on April 18 to coincide with the anniversary of Superman's debut in Action Comics #1 (1938). Commentators highlighted the focus on Krypto and his relationship with Superman in the extended footage, and the behind-the-scenes footage's emphasis on Superman's hopefulness alongside the elaborate sets and costumes. That May, DC Comics and Milk-Bone collaborated on the tie-in comic Superman: A Friendship Unleashed featuring Superman and Krypto to cross-promote the film and the latter's dog biscuits. The comic was also made available at San Diego Comic Con that July.

An official trailer was released on May 14, which Ray Flook at Bleeding Cool called a "banger", highlighting its action, humor, and supporting DC characters. He said the trailer proved that Superman was "in the right hands" with Gunn's interpretation and that it was "definitely the Superman we need in our lives, now more than ever". IGN's Wesley Yin-Poole highlighted Kent and Lane's relationship, and felt the trailer's interview highlighted the ethics of Superman's intervention in a foreign war, which Polygon's Michael McWhertor also commented upon, noting that the trailer questioned if Superman's actions represented American values. The children's book Superman: Friends and Foes! and a prequel junior novel, Superman: Welcome to Metropolis, were both released in early June. Friends and Foes! features the Hammer of Boravia as well as Metamorpho and his son Joey, following speculation about their roles from trailer footage, while Welcome to Metropolis explores the early career of Clark and Lois at the Daily Planet, the Justice Gang members, and features the character Metallo. A final trailer was released on June 11, one month before the film's release. Germain Lussier of Gizmodo called it the "most revealing trailer to date" and highlighted the trailer's visual effects and action sequences and its depiction of Luthor's hatred for Superman. Total Film's George Marston speculated that Superman would be working both with and against the Justice Gang based on scenes of him collaborating with Mister Terrific and Gardner being at "odds with Superman", while Ernesto Valenzuela from MovieWeb felt Luthor's initial monologue being "superseded" by Superman's "optimism" was a "brilliant way to construct this trailer".

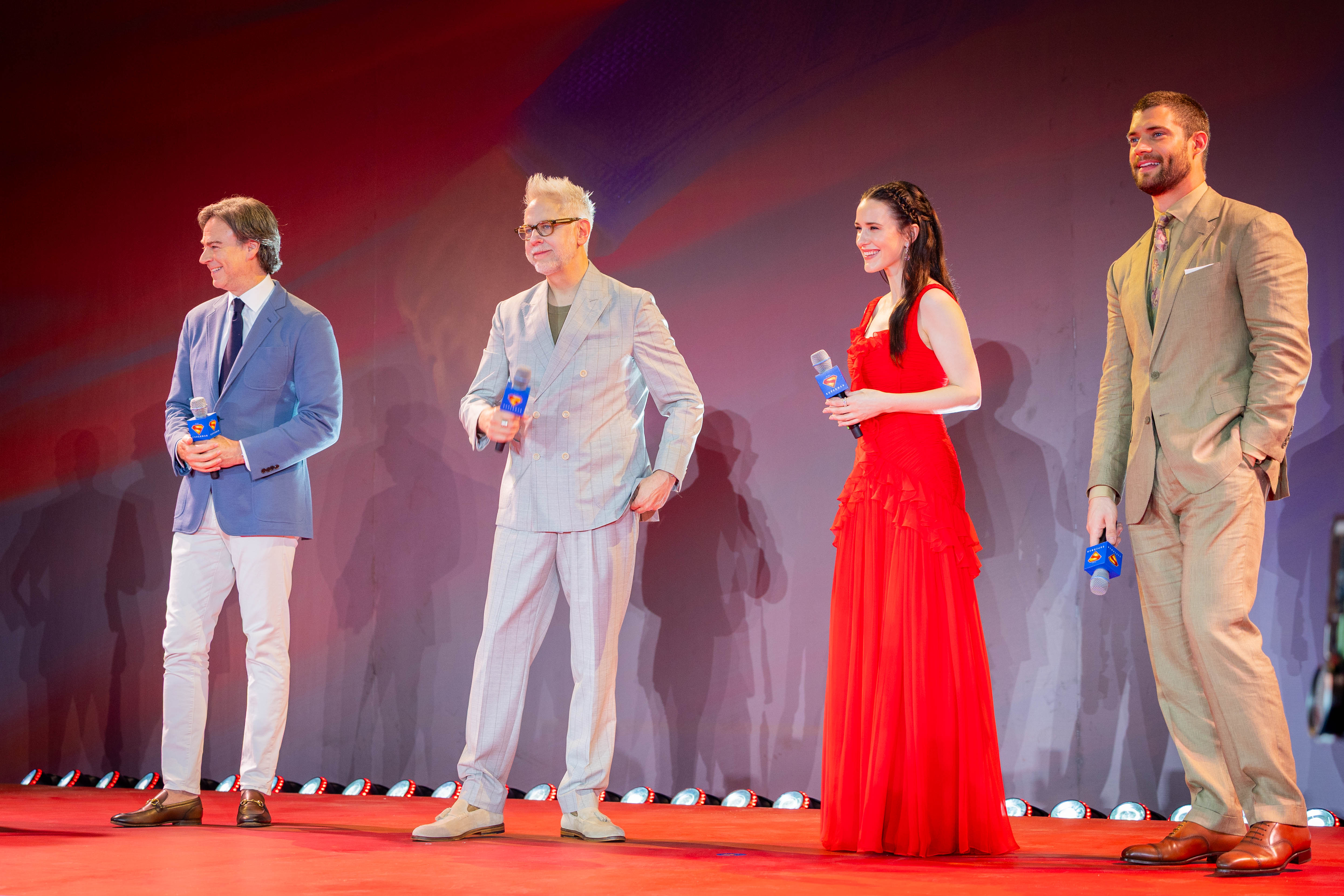
(L–R): Superman producer Peter Safran, writer/director James Gunn, and stars Rachel Brosnahan and David Corenswet promoting the film at the SM Mall of Asia in Manila in June 2025

The first 30 minutes of the film were shown at CineEurope in Barcelona on June 17, and at the SM Mall of Asia in Manila on June 19, as the start of the "Superman World Tour", which took place in seven major international cities leading up to the film's release. Veda Luna Zabala at Nylon Manila described the footage as "fun, colorful, and hopeful", and highlighted Hoult's performance. An 11 feet (3.4 m) tall Superman statue modeled after Corenswet was suspended at the top of the Shard in London on July 1, encouraging pedestrians to "Look Up". This was the largest public sculpture to be displayed in the United Kingdom, and it took four months to craft. 25 pop-up Daily Planet newsstand kiosks were also installed at multiple locations throughout London. Warner Bros. hosted a fan event for Superman on July 2, at Cineworld Leicester Square in London. The film partnered with Fandango and Amazon Prime for early access theatrical screenings on July 8, which became Fandango's best-selling first-day presale tickets for that year, surpassing the general presale tickets for Marvel's The Fantastic Four: First Steps, also released that month. The Lola Cars Formula E team ran a special livery based on the film for the 2025 Berlin ePrix. Funko and McFarlane Toys also released action figures based on the film. The Hollywood Reporter reported that DC Studios and Warner Bros. spent approximately $200 million on marketing, for a total cost around $400 million with the production budget, though Variety reported that marketing cost $125 million.

Leading up to the film's release and amid the mass deportations during the second presidency of U.S. president Donald Trump, Gunn said that "Superman is the story of America" and "an immigrant that came from other places and populated the country, but for me it is mostly a story that says basic human kindness is a value and is something we have lost." This received backlash from some supporters of Trump and members of the MAGA movement, with some pundits on Fox News calling the film "Superwoke". Gunn responded that Superman was for "everyone", explaining that it was "about kindness and I think that's something everyone can relate to".

== Release ==
=== Theatrical ===
Superman premiered at the TCL Chinese Theater on July 7, 2025, and was released theatrically by Warner Bros. Pictures internationally on July 9, and in the United States and China on July 11, in IMAX, RealD 3D, Dolby Cinema, ScreenX, and 4DX.

In January 2025, the estate of Superman co-creator Joe Shuster filed a lawsuit against WBD, asserting that the rights to distribute the film in some international territories had reverted to them based on different copyright laws: the United Kingdom, Ireland, and Australia in 2017, and Canada in 2021. Two months later, WBD filed a motion to dismiss the lawsuit, citing prior copyright lawsuits being rejected, and it was dismissed in April due to a lack of jurisdiction. The lawsuit was refiled with the New York Supreme Court a month later, with an injunction requested, but the motion was denied in early June.

=== Home media ===
The film was released for digital download on August 15, 2025, and was released on the Warner Bros. streaming service HBO Max on September 19, after a respective 35-day and a 70-day theatrical window, followed by Ultra HD Blu-ray, Blu-ray, and DVD on September 23. The home media releases include deleted scenes, a making-of documentary, a commentary by Gunn, the first short of the animated series Krypto Saves the Day!, and various featurettes. Gunn said Superman was released early on digital platforms to allow audiences to watch it before the second season of Peacemaker (2025), which connects to the film. The film accumulated 13 million global viewers within its first ten days on HBO Max, which was the highest amount for that period for a "pay-one" film on that service since Barbie in December 2023. Superman's streaming release also prompted increased viewership for other Superman films around that time, including the documentary Super/Man: The Christopher Reeve Story (2024), the 1978 Superman film, Superman Returns (2006), and Man of Steel.

== Reception ==
=== Box-office performance ===
Superman grossed $354.2 million in the United States and Canada, and $264.5 million in other territories, for a worldwide total of $618.7 million. It is the tenth highest-grossing film of 2025, the highest-grossing superhero film of that year, and the first DC film to surpass all Marvel films released within a single year since The Dark Knight in 2008. Umberto Gonzalez at TheWrap described this as a "stunning reversal of fortune" for Marvel. According to Variety, the film was expected to earn a theatrical profit of approximately $125 million, while Bloomberg Businessweek and TheWrap both reported that the film earned over $100 million in profit through a combination of ticket sales, online home media rentals, and merchandise partnerships. Writers at Variety, ComicBook.com, and /Film compared the film's financial performance and reported profitability to the box-office earnings of Man of Steel, and questioned whether the film's relatively low profits could make it considered a commercial success, given the ambiguity of Hollywood accounting methods. Conversely, Forbes estimated that, because studios typically share half of their box office earnings with movie theater exhibitors, Superman earned around $308 million from its theatrical run, below its total $350 million budget when factoring together production and marketing expenses.

At the start of June 2025, TheWrap estimated that Superman needed to gross more than $500 million worldwide to become profitable at the box office, but that it would need to earn around $700 million to be considered a success, a notion which Gunn disputed. The Hollywood Reporter estimated that the film could have a domestic opening weekend of around $175 million and a potential global total of over $1 billion, based on the first full trailer's engagement metrics, while noting its production and marketing costs accounted for a total of around $400 million. Three weeks ahead of the film's release, Superman was projected to earn $125–145 million or approximately $135 million in its domestic opening weekend, which would be higher than the debut of Man of Steel ($116 million). DC Studios and Warner Bros. estimated a more conservative debut of $90–125 million, while the potential $175 million debut remained projected, which would surpass the debut of Batman v Superman: Dawn of Justice ($166 million) as the biggest opening for a DC film. In the week of release, Deadline Hollywood projected the film's domestic opening gross to be around $115–130 million.

On July 10, Deadline Hollywood reported the film earned $2.8 million from Tuesday previews for an estimated total of $21 million, including Thursday previews. Final Thursday previews would see the film make $22.5 million, when counting both theatrical and Tuesday Amazon Prime screenings ($2.8 million). This was, at the time, the best preview box office for any film released in the year 2025 before The Fantastic Four: First Steps surpassed it two weeks later, as well as a record for any film involving Gunn. This was also higher than the previous preview box office record Warner Bros. achieved with Barbie. The film was now projected to make $115–$121 million at the domestic box office during its opening weekend, and over $210 million worldwide during this time as well. The film made $56.5 million on its first day, the second-highest of 2025, behind A Minecraft Movie. It ended up debuting to $125 million, finishing atop the box office, and becoming the biggest opening weekend for a standalone Superman film ahead of Man of Steel, as well as the second-biggest opening weekend for a film featuring Superman, behind Batman v Superman: Dawn of Justice. It also scored the third-highest opening weekend for a 2025 film, behind A Minecraft Movie and Lilo & Stitch. In its second weekend, the film remained in first place, grossing $57 million. This marked a 54% drop, which was deemed better than other superhero films of 2025 up until that point, such as Captain America: Brave New World (68%) and Thunderbolts* (56%), attributed to positive word-of-mouth, with Comscore analyst Paul Dergarabedian pointing out that the film's second-weekend drop is "indicative of a marketplace that's embracing the film". In its third weekend, the film was dethroned by newcomer The Fantastic Four: First Steps, finishing second, earning $24.9 million, a 57% drop. By the end of July, Superman became the first DC film since The Batman (2022) to earn over $300 million domestically, and in late August, it became the first DC film, also since The Batman, to earn $600 million globally. While still earning over $1 million domestically in an already reduced wide release of 1,187 theatres in week nine, the film was cut back to 390 theatres in week 10, and pulled from domestic theatres after week 12.

In its opening weekend, the film made an estimated $95 million from international markets, for a total gross of $220 million. The film's highest-grossing territories include the United Kingdom ($9.8 million), Mexico ($8.8 million), China ($6.6 million), Brazil ($5.9 million), Australia ($5.3 million), France ($4.2 million), Korea ($4.2 million), India ($3.8 million), Spain ($2.9 million) and Japan ($2.5 million). Its perceived underperformance outside of the United States and Canada, particularly in markets like China, where it debuted in fourth place, was partially attributed to the character's American patriotic roots, with David A. Gross from the FranchiseRe movie consulting firm stating "Superman has always been identified as a quintessentially American character and story, and in some parts of the world, America is currently not enjoying its greatest popularity".

=== Critical response ===
Critics found the film to be fun, colorful, and earnest, although some felt it was overstuffed with characters and ideas. The performances of Corenswet, Brosnahan, and Hoult were praised. On review aggregator Rotten Tomatoes, 83% of 505 critics gave the film a positive review for an average rating of 7.2/10. The website's critics' consensus reads, "Pulling off the heroic feat of fleshing out a dynamic new world while putting its champion's big, beating heart front and center, this Superman flies high as a Man of Tomorrow grounded in the here and now." Metacritic assigned the film a weighted average score of 68 out of 100 based on 58 critics, indicating "generally favorable" reviews. Audiences polled by CinemaScore gave the film an average grade of "A−" on an A+ to F scale, the same as Man of Steel. Those surveyed by PostTrak gave it an 86% positive score, and 74% said they would definitely recommend it.

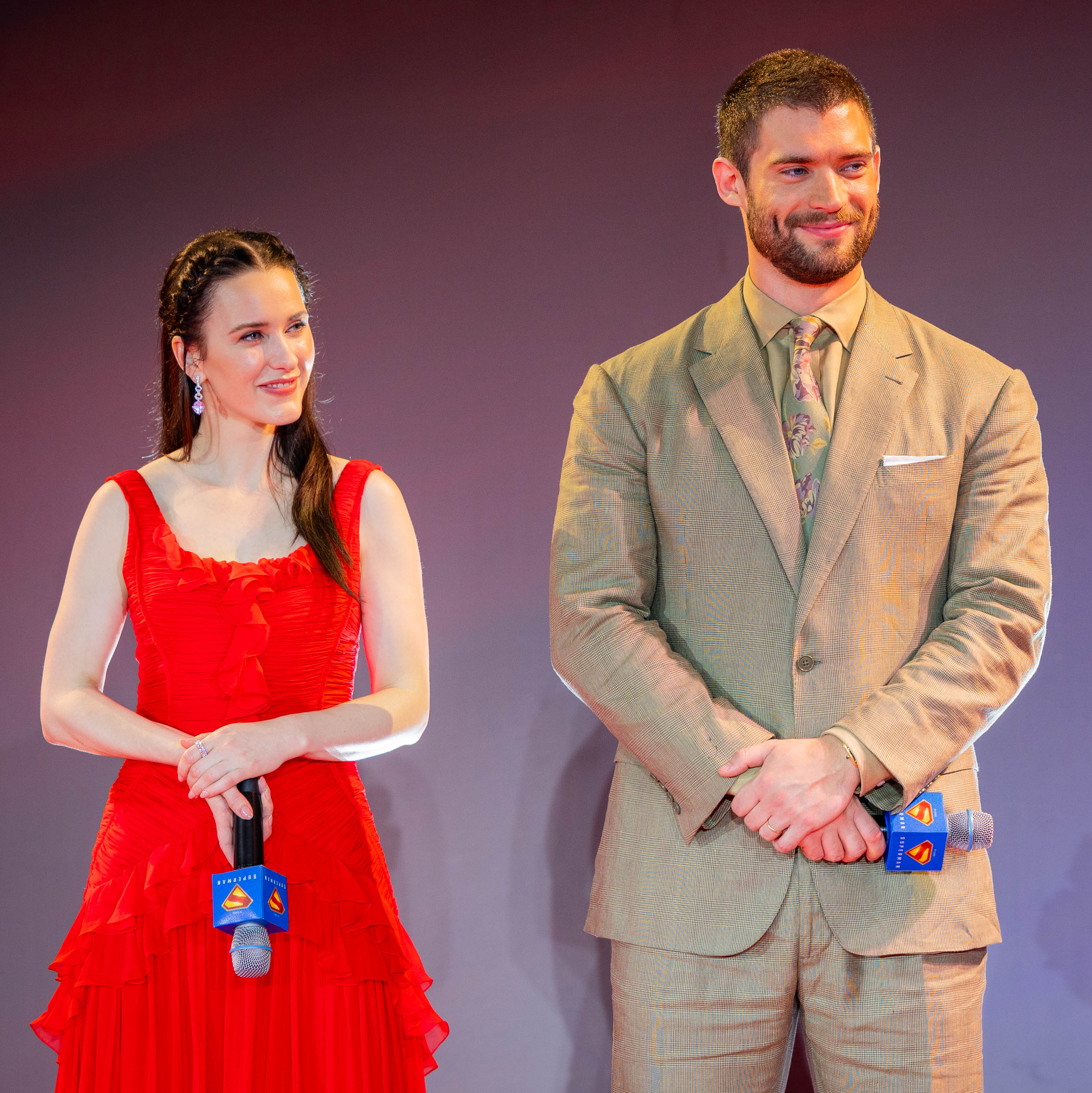
Brosnahan and Corenswet promoting the film in Manila in June 2025. Both received praise for their performances.

IGN rated the film 8/10, calling it "wonderfully entertaining and heartfelt". Scott Phillips of Forbes praised its colorful visuals, humor and lighthearted tone. Trace Sauveur of AwardsWatch welcomed its no‑origin‑story, no‑crossover approach. Jake Cole of Slant Magazine argued the character endures because he transcends passing trends. Cody Dericks of Next Best Picture felt the casting is as pitch‑perfect as Christopher Reeve's was decades ago. Writing for NPR, Glen Weldon gave the film a positive review, stating that it "delivers a Superman deeply in touch with his humanity, and perfectly representative of the essence of the character."

Liz Shannon Miller of Consequence called it: "A movie that doesn't sacrifice its titular character in service to franchise-building. Instead, it focuses on celebrating the values that Superman himself has embodied from the beginning." William Bibbiani of TheWrap wrote: "James Gunn tried to make a great Superman movie, one that embraces the wonder of the character as an action hero and a moral paragon, which derives its drama from how people react to his faith in us. He succeeded." Nicholas Barber at BBC Culture gave the film three stars out of five, and wrote: "It takes some gall to make a zillion-dollar Hollywood blockbuster that feels so much like an eccentric sci-fi B-movie." Alissa Wilkinson of The New York Times called it a goofy yet charming take and compared it to Iron Man (2008). Variety's Owen Gleiberman praised the performances and gave it a positive review. David Crow of Den of Geek said the film achieves "true grace" when it narrows its focus to Lois and Clark.

Among more negative reviews, Peter Bradshaw of The Guardian gave the film two stars out of five, criticizing its "pointless, cluttered backstory" and "yet another CGI city‑leveling finale". In a 2 out of 5 review for Empire, Sophie Butcher described it as "bold and bright and full of color and cosmic invention" but added that "the final act sinks into CGI chaos, with an unsatisfying climax, an eye-roll-inducing reveal, a restlessly intermittent tone, and an insistence on prioritizing things and people we don't really care about over core characters." Erik Kain gave the film two out of five for Forbes, writing that the "massive" cast finds itself in an "overstuffed, badly-paced plot" and that "the story moves from one action sequence to the next, racing forward at a breakneck pace that leaves little room for character development." Mark Kermode described the film as "tonally all over the place" and "messy", but that the film was "unexpectedly good fun" and overall enjoyable.

The film features a war between the fictional nations of Boravia—an aggressor backed by Luthor and the United States—and its neighbor Jarhanpur, which some critics argue mirrors the real-world dynamics of the Israeli–Palestinian conflict, particularly the Gaza war that began in 2023. Gunn has maintained that the script predated the war and was not intended as an allegory.

=== Accolades ===
Accolades received by Superman
Award	Date of ceremony	Category	Recipient(s)	Result	Ref.
Annie Awards	February 21, 2026	Outstanding Achievement for Character Animation in a Live Action Production	Loic Mireault, Michael Elder, Philipp Winterstein, Victor Dinis, and Diego de Paula Pereira Batista	Nominated	
Astra Creative Arts Awards	December 11, 2025	Best Visual Effects	Stéphane Ceretti, Enrico Damm, Stéphane Nazé, and Guy Williams	Nominated	
Astra Creative Arts Awards	December 11, 2025	Best Stunts	Superman	Nominated	
Astra Creative Arts Awards	December 11, 2025	Best Marketing Campaign	Superman	Nominated	
Astra Film Awards	January 9, 2026	Best Book to Screen Adaptation	Superman	Nominated	
Astra Film Awards	January 9, 2026	Best Action or Science Fiction Feature	Superman	Won	
Astra Midseason Movie Awards	July 3, 2025	Most Anticipated Film	Superman	Nominated	
Capri Hollywood International Film Festival	January 5, 2026	Best Visual Effects	Stéphane Ceretti, Enrico Damm, Stéphane Nazé, and Guy Williams	Won	
Critics' Choice Movie Awards	January 4, 2026	Best Visual Effects	Stéphane Ceretti, Enrico Damm, Stéphane Nazé, and Guy Williams	Nominated	
Critics' Choice Super Awards	August 6, 2026	Best Superhero Movie	Superman	Won	
Critics' Choice Super Awards	August 6, 2026	Best Actor in a Superhero Movie	David Corenswet	Won	
Critics' Choice Super Awards	August 6, 2026	Best Actor in a Superhero Movie	Edi Gathegi	Nominated	
Critics' Choice Super Awards	August 6, 2026	Best Actor in a Superhero Movie	Nicholas Hoult	Nominated	
Critics' Choice Super Awards	August 6, 2026	Best Actress in a Superhero Movie	Rachel Brosnahan	Nominated	
Critics' Choice Super Awards	August 6, 2026	Best Villain in a Movie	Nicholas Hoult as Lex Luthor	Nominated	
Golden Trailer Awards	May 29, 2025	Best Summer 2025 Blockbuster Trailer	"Fight"	Nominated	
Hugo Awards	August 30, 2026	Best Dramatic Presentation, Long Form	Superman	Nominated	
Latino Entertainment Journalists Association	February 9, 2026	Best Visual Effects	Stéphane Ceretti, Enrico Damm, Stéphane Nazé, and Guy Williams	Nominated	
Movieguide Awards	February 6, 2026	Best Movie for Mature Audiences	Superman	Nominated	
National Film Awards UK	July 1, 2026	Best International Film	Superman	Nominated	
Nickelodeon Kids' Choice Awards	November 14, 2026	Favorite Movie	Superman	Nominated	
Nickelodeon Kids' Choice Awards	November 14, 2026	Favorite Movie Actor	David Corenswet	Nominated	
North Carolina Film Critics Association	January 26, 2026	Best Special Effects	Stéphane Ceretti, Enrico Damm, Stéphane Nazé, and Guy Williams	Nominated	
North Carolina Film Critics Association	January 26, 2026	Best Stunt Coordination	Superman	Nominated	
Online Film Critics Society	February 9, 2026	Best Visual Effects	Stéphane Ceretti, Enrico Damm, Stéphane Nazé, and Guy Williams	Nominated	
Satellite Awards	March 10, 2026	Best Visual Effects	Stéphane Ceretti, Enrico Damm, Stéphane Nazé, and Guy Williams	Nominated	
Saturn Awards	March 8, 2026	Best Cinematic Adaptation Film	Superman	Nominated	
Saturn Awards	March 8, 2026	Best Film Direction	James Gunn	Nominated	
Saturn Awards	March 8, 2026	Best Actor in a Film	David Corenswet	Nominated	
Saturn Awards	March 8, 2026	Best Actress in a Film	Rachel Brosnahan	Nominated	
Saturn Awards	March 8, 2026	Best Supporting Actor in a Film	Edi Gathegi	Nominated	
Saturn Awards	March 8, 2026	Best Film Production Design	Beth Mickle	Nominated	
Saturn Awards	March 8, 2026	Best Film Costume Design	Judianna Makovsky	Nominated	
Saturn Awards	March 8, 2026	Best Film Visual / Special Effects	Stéphane Ceretti, Enrico Damm, Stéphane Nazé, and Guy Williams	Nominated	
Visual Effects Society Awards	February 25, 2026	Outstanding Character in a Photoreal Feature	Loic Mireault, Martine Chartrand, Marianne Morency, Matthias Schoenegger (for "Krypto the Superdog")	Nominated	
Visual Effects Society Awards	February 25, 2026	Outstanding Effects Simulations in a Photoreal Feature	Rick Hankins, Marcel Kern, Eric Hollands, Masoud Aziminajjar (for "Metropolis City Destruction")	Nominated	
Visual Effects Society Awards	February 25, 2026	Outstanding Compositing & Lighting in a Feature	Can Chang, Nicolas Caillier, Bryan Smeall, Elona Musha (for "Fights and Metropolis City Destruction")	Nominated	
Visual Effects Society Awards	February 25, 2026	Outstanding Model in a Photoreal or Animated Project	Crystal Bretz, Martin Pelissier, Klaudio Ladavac, Conner Wessinger (for "The Fortress of Solitude")	Nominated	

For the 98th Academy Awards, Superman was shortlisted in the categories of Best Sound and Best Visual Effects. For the 83rd Golden Globes, Superman was submitted for the categories of Best Motion Picture – Drama and Cinematic and Box Office Achievement, while other submissions included Corenswet for Best Actor in a Motion Picture – Drama, Brosnahan for Best Supporting Actress, Hoult for Best Supporting Actor, Gunn for Best Director and Best Screenplay, and "The Mighty Crabjoys Theme" by Gunn, Eric Nally, and Devin Williams for Best Original Song.

== Future ==
=== Follow-up film ===
In June 2025, Gunn said he had begun writing a follow-up to Superman that would not be a direct sequel, but would feature Superman in a major role. Corenswet and Brosnahan had options for a potential sequel, but following Superman's release in July, a direct sequel was not expected to be imminently announced. The follow-up film, entitled Man of Tomorrow, was announced that September, with Gunn also directing, and is scheduled to be released on July 9, 2027. Gunn described it as the next story in the "Superman Saga" that was "as much a Lex movie as it is a Superman movie" and said it would include the pair working together against a bigger threat. Corenswet and Hoult will co-headline the film, returning alongside Brosnahan, Gisondo, Sampaio, De Faría, Merced, Gathegi, Fillion, Grillo, and Alcock. They are joined by Lars Eidinger as the film's antagonist Brainiac; Aaron Pierre in his role of the Green Lantern John Stewart from the DCU television series Lanterns (2026); Xolo Maridueña reprising his role of Jaime Reyes / Blue Beetle from the DCEU film Blue Beetle (2023); and Adria Arjona, reportedly as Maxima; alongside Andre Royo, Matthew Lillard, and Sinqua Walls in undisclosed roles.

=== Spin-off series ===
Following the release of Superman in July 2025, Gunn was revealed to be considering spin-off television series featuring supporting characters from the film, such as Gathegi's Mister Terrific and Gisondo's Jimmy Olsen. The first series, The People v. Gorilla Grodd, was ordered for HBO Max in August 2026 as an eight-episode half-hour mockumentary comedy presented as a true crime docuseries hosted by Olsen and focused on the superintelligent ape Gorilla Grodd, portrayed by Jimmy Tatro. Dan Perrault and Tony Yacenda serve as the writers, executive producers, and showrunners of the series, which features other supporting cast members from Superman reprising their roles as Daily Planet reporters, except for Corenswet and Brosnahan. The Mister Terrific series was revealed to be in active development in July 2026, with Allan Heinberg writing the pilot.
