= Superman: Friends and Foes! =

2025 children's movie tie-in book

- Language: English
- Genre: Superhero; Children's literature
- Set in: Metropolis, Delaware, DC Universe
- Publisher: Penguin Random House
- Publication date: June 3, 2025
- Publication place: United States
- Media type: Print
- Pages: 24
- ISBN: 9798217027118

Superman: Friends and Foes! is a children's book which was published prior to the release of the 2025 film Superman as promotional material. The book was noted as the first media to reveal the identity of Joey Mason, a character from the film who is Metamorpho's son, as well as provided an early look at an original villain in the film, the Hammer of Boravia.

== Premise ==
The book introduces several characters from the film Superman to its readers, providing pictures of the characters and a small amount of information about them.

== Publication history ==
Superman: Friends and Foes was published in early June 2025, one month before the film it ties into.

== Reception ==
The majority of the response to the book was centered around the reveal of the identity of a baby who was seen in the trailer for Superman as Joey Mason, the son of Metamorpho. IGN Portugal noted that James Gunn himself had not shared anything about Joey, making the book the first time the character's identity was revealed. It also gave a brief description of Joey's role in the film. Although IGN Portugal referred to the book as an unofficial source, they still considered the information within it to be official. Shashank Shakya of Beebom.com noted the vagueness of Joey's entry, not elaborating on things such as how Lex Luthor managed to get Joey. Shakya speculated that the book was indicating Joey would be a significant part of getting Metamorpho to side with Superman against Luthor. The Direct referred to the reveal as a spoiler, noting that Metamorpho's role in the film was largely being kept quiet as one of the biggest mysteries prior to the film's release. Their speculation was similar to Shakya's, also noting that Joey might have superpowers to rival his father. In contrast, IGN did not feel the book provided a lot of information, although they felt it made sense given the brief shots of Joey in the trailer.
