= Superman (2025 soundtrack) =

2025 soundtrack album by John Murphy and David Fleming

Superman (Original Motion Picture Soundtrack)

Soundtrack album by John Murphy and David Fleming
- Released: July 8, 2025
- Recorded: December 2023–April 2025
- Studios: Eastwood Scoring Stage, Warner Bros. Studios, Burbank
- Genres: Film score; soundtrack album
- Length: 77:00
- Label: WaterTower
- Producers: John Murphy; David Fleming; Tyler Barton

John Murphy chronology
Guardians of the Galaxy Vol. 3 (2023)	Superman (2025)

David Fleming chronology
The Alto Knights (2025)	Superman (2025)	Eternity (2025)

Superman (Original Motion Picture Soundtrack) is the soundtrack album to the DC Universe (DCU) film of the same name written and directed by James Gunn, starring David Corenswet as the eponymous character, alongside Rachel Brosnahan and Nicholas Hoult. The film score is jointly composed by John Murphy and David Fleming, and incorporates John Williams' main theme from the original 1978 film.

The soundtrack was released by WaterTower Music on July 8, 2025.

== Production history ==
John Murphy was confirmed to compose music for Superman in February 2024, after previously working with Gunn on The Suicide Squad (2021), The Guardians of the Galaxy Holiday Special (2022) and Guardians of the Galaxy Vol. 3 (2023), while David Fleming joined the film as a co-composer sharing credits for the score with Murphy; his involvement was confirmed during April 2025. Before Murphy and Fleming's confirmation, Gunn said that much of the film score and themes were written even before the script being conceptualized but the composers were not announced as he had to finalize the deal with the studios by then.

Murphy and Fleming considered Gunn's enthusiasm on superhero projects helped in curating a creative and larger-than-life score with Fleming further attributing his interest on comics and graphic novels during childhood as the genesis for the score; the first graphic novel he read, The Death of Superman (1992) helped him to develop themes that reflect the core truth of Superman. Gunn further confirmed that Murphy was using a new version of John Williams' "Superman March" theme from Richard Donner's Superman (1978). Gunn considered Williams's score to be one of the greatest of all time and had associated his theme with Superman from the start of the film's development. He saw the theme's inclusion as one way for the film to harken back to past iterations. Both composers also opined on Williams' theme being the DNA for the film's score and had incorporated them into the original material providing variety in colors, texture and instrumentation.

Murphy considered Superman as a decent figure, maintaining his purity and honesty even at grim circumstances, hence the score was considered to have an orchestral. However, Gunn's openness to experimentation at specific instances led them to craft themes revolving around Superman to be orchestral while becoming "messy" at other themes. Besides the orchestra, Fleming played both electric and acoustic guitar with fellow musicians Yvette Young and Andrew Synowiec. He further worked with the Los Angeles Philharmonic for the orchestral portions, where Fleming split up the string section into two and mirror them which each other, as they split down in the middle and bring the effect of doubling synthesizers, providing a "very off-kilter" sound. He also liked working on the themes for Green Lantern, the Daily Planet, and Lois Lane, whose character had a detective angle.

The film has fewer licensed songs than Gunn's previous superhero projects. On the soundtrack, producer and DC Studios executive Peter Safran's daughter Lou Lou performs a song with the American rock band Foxy Shazam, with Lou Lou and the band's member Eric Nally on vocals, and written by Gunn and Nally. Gunn stated that he included the Teddybears and Iggy Pop song "Punkrocker" in the soundtrack after discovering it through the Spotify algorithm.

== Release ==
The main theme titled "Theme from Superman" which incorporated Williams' theme had two versions, featured in both the teaser and trailer and released in conjunction with the promotional materials as singles. WaterTower Music released the soundtrack on July 8, 2025, featuring 33 tracks that included selections from Murphy and Fleming's score, as well as three songs. Mondo would further release a double LP of the score album in two colors—"Blue/ Red / White Spinner" and "Solid Red / Blue"—and pre-orders for the album will be scheduled on July 11.

== Track listing ==
No.	Title	Writer(s)	Artist(s)	Length
1.	"Home"	David Fleming; John Williams	David Fleming	2:02
2.	"Last Son"	Fleming; Williams	Fleming	2:46
3.	"Hammer of Boravia"	Fleming; Andrew Kawczynski; Forest Christenson	Fleming	3:02
4.	"LuthorCorp"	John Murphy; Molly Murphy	John Murphy	1:37
5.	"The Daily Planet"	Fleming	Fleming	0:54
6.	"Lois & Clark"	Murphy	Murphy	1:08
7.	"Eyes Up Here"	Fleming; Williams	Fleming	2:22
8.	"Justice Gang vs. Kaiju"	Fleming; Williams	Fleming	3:23
9.	"Intruders"	Fleming; Murphy; Kawczynski; Christenson; Halli Cauthery	Fleming	3:25
10.	"The Message"	Fleming; Murphy; Cauthery; Jake Boring	Murphy; Fleming	2:43
11.	"Secret Harem"	Fleming; Murphy; Tyler Barton; Kawczynski	Murphy; Fleming	2:20
12.	"The Real Punk Rock"	Murphy	Murphy	1:29
13.	"Pocket Universe"	Fleming	Fleming	1:55
14.	"5 Years Time"	Charlie Fink	Noah and the Whale	3:34
15.	"Something Like a Sun"	Fleming; Murphy; Boring; Williams	Murphy; Fleming	2:19
16.	"Jailbreak"	Fleming; Williams	Fleming	1:06
17.	"The River Pi"	Fleming; Christenson; Williams	Fleming	3:25
18.	"Take the T-Craft"	Fleming; Murphy; Cauthery	Murphy; Fleming	1:38
19.	"Your Choices, Your Actions"	Fleming; Williams	Fleming	2:55
20.	"Raising the Flag"	Murphy; Williams	Murphy	1:49
21.	"The Rift"	Fleming; Murphy; Christenson; Boring; Williams	Fleming	4:53
22.	"Bases Loaded"	Fleming; Murphy; Kawczynski	Fleming	3:07
23.	"Speeding Bullet"	Fleming; Christenson	Fleming	2:02
24.	"Remote Control"	Fleming; Murphy; Kawczynski; Christenson; Williams	Murphy; Fleming	3:02
25.	"Upgrade"	Fleming; Murphy; Kawczynski	Murphy; Fleming	1:13
26.	"Driven by Envy"	Murphy; Fleming	Murphy; Fleming	2:04
27.	"Look Up"	Fleming; Williams	Fleming	2:45
28.	"Being Human"	Fleming; Cauthery; Williams	Fleming	1:57
29.	"Luthor the Traitor"	Murphy	Murphy	1:51
30.	"Metropolis"	Murphy; Fleming	Murphy; Fleming	1:17
31.	"Walking on Air"	Murphy	Murphy	1:34
32.	"Punkrocker"	Joakim Åhlund; Patrik Arve; Klas Åhlund	Teddybears feat. Iggy Pop	4:07
33.	"The Mighty Crabjoys Theme"	James Gunn; Eric Nally; Devin Williams	The Mighty Crabjoys	1:16
Total length:				77:00

== Additional music ==
Sophie Madeleine's cover of Bring Me Sunshine is featured in the film.

== Reception ==
Pete Hammond of Deadline Hollywood wrote "Music by John Murphy and David Fleming does what is expected, but the snippets we hear of John Williams' immortal score for the 1978 classic just remind of the emotional power that is missing from this Superman which doesn't try to compete, but plays in its own field." Amy Nicholson of Los Angeles Times called it "a very good doom metal electronic score by John Murphy and David Fleming". Tom Jorgensen of IGN wrote "John Murphy and David Fleming's guitar-heavy score gives these scenes an impressive sense of gravity, and that extends to the emotional moments, too. Although Murphy and Fleming quote John Williams' original Superman theme liberally, Gunn is more judicious with his crate-digging, mixtape-making sensibility this time out. That makes their driving and inspiring compositions all the more important."

David Rooney of The Hollywood Reporter called it "a galvanizing orchestral and synth score by John Murphy and David Fleming that weaves in the immortal John Williams theme, Gunn's Superman is overloaded, even muddled at times, but relentlessly entertaining." Siddhant Adlakha of Mashable wrote "The score is electric at times — pun intended — though it's most memorable when composers John Murphy and David Fleming aren't charged with recreating John Williams' motifs from 1978's Superman: The Movie." Lisa Laman of Looper, meanwhile, declared the score one of the highlights of Superman and a welcome contrast to the quality of Murphy's previous comic book movie scores. She especially praised tracks like "Speeding Bullet" for their theatricality and stirring energy.

Zanobard Reviews gave the score a mixed review, stating that, while the new material for "the bustling Daily Planet, villainous Luthor, gentle love and heroic Justice Gang [is] interesting", the score was overall "sadly focused on cheap, trailerised repeating excerpts of John Williams' iconic theme playing over seemingly synthesized, generic-sounding action music". Filmtracks.com gave the score a one-star review, unfavorably comparing it to Hans Zimmer's prior efforts on Man of Steel: "Zimmer's score was simply terrible on its own merit. This time, you hear Williams' music crucified, and that emotional gut punch is arguably worse. What you hear is like Williams' music run through a Zimmer artificial intelligence filter to make it bigger, heavier, and more bad-ass in every cue of any significant volume." He also wrote off Murphy and Fleming's new themes as "ineffective and dumb in their expression" and was heavily critical of the score's mixing and orchestration, dubbing it "the ultimate dumbing-down of this sullied franchise".

Music critic Jonathan Broxton of Movie Music UK likewise critiqued the usage of Williams' "Superman March", stating "These versions of the theme sound like those Youtube videos where a young kid with a set of samples has created an "epic" re-imagining of a theme, full of simple harmonies, chugging ostinatos, and massive synth choirs, reducing the whole thing to sound like modern trailer music, devoid of any nuance or subtlety or sophistication", though he did have some appreciation for Fleming's "Justice Gang" theme, which he dubbed "modern, appropriately heroic, [...] injecting a sense of crowd-pleasing bravery into his punk rock orchestra". James Southall of Movie Wave also expressed his disappointment with the film's score, stating, "If you leave aside the mistreatment of the Williams material, you're left with something that sounds pretty generic and could be from any 2025 action movie. It doesn't really sound like there's any great ambition there to create something lasting".

== Charts ==
Chart performance for Superman
Chart (2025)	Peak position
UK Soundtrack Albums (Official Charts)	2
