= White Queen (comics) =

White Queen, in comics, may refer to:

- Marvel Comics characters, members of Hellfire Club:
  - Paris Seville, member of the Council of the Chosen
  - Emma Frost, member of The Lords Cardinal
  - Storm (Marvel Comics), after the Dark Phoenix Saga
  - Adrienne Frost, Emma's sister
  - Sat-Yr-9 (pretending to be Courtney Ross)
- DC Comics characters who are members of Checkmate:
  - Oksana Verchenko, during the events around The OMAC Project
  - Amanda Waller, as part of the post-Infinite Crisis line-up, who had earlier been Black King
  - Valentina Vostok, a former member of Doom Patrol, who replaced Waller when her plans were revealed

== See also ==
- White Queen (disambiguation)
- Black Queen (comics)
- White King (comics)
- Red Queen (comics), the White Queen equivalent in the London branch of the Hellfire Club
