= White King =

White King may refer to:

- The White King chess piece
- White King (Through the Looking-Glass), a character from Lewis Carroll's fantasy novella Through the Looking Glass
- White King (comics), a number of comics characters
- White King, a brand of household cleaners made by Los Angeles Soap Co.
- White King, a brand of household bleach made in Australia by Pental
- Weisskunig, The White King, a romanticized autobiography by Maximilian I, Holy Roman Emperor
- The prophecy of the White King, prophecy revived by William Lilly 1644
- The White King, award winning Hungarian novel by György Dragomán
- The White King (film), a 2016 British sci-fi film

== See also ==
- White Kingdom (disambiguation)
- White Queen (disambiguation)
