= Black Queen (comics) =

Black Queen, in comics, may refer to:

- Marvel Comics characters, members of Hellfire Club:
  - Selene (comics), replaced Phoenix after the Dark Phoenix Saga
  - Emma Steed, part of the London branch's Inner Circle
  - Emma Frost, the former White Queen used the alias when she was part of the Dark X-Men
- DC Comics characters, who are members of Checkmate:
  - Patricia Grace-Colby, during the events around The OMAC Project
  - Sasha Bordeaux, in the post-Infinite Crisis line-up

== See also ==
- Black Queen (disambiguation)
- White Queen (comics)
- Black King (comics)
