= Full Nelson (Peacemaker) =

- Peacemaker episode
- Episode no.: Season 2 Episode 8
- Directed by: James Gunn
- Written by: James Gunn
- Cinematography by: Sam McCurdy
- Editing by: Gregg Featherman
- Original air date: October 9, 2025
- Running time: 57 minutes

Guest appearances
- Stephen Blackehart as Sydney Happersen; Terence Rosemore as Otis Berg; James Hiroyuki Liao as Secretary Stephen Mori; Nelson: Gunnar Nelson as Himself; Matthew Nelson as Himself; Elizabeth Ludlow as Keeya Adebayo

Episode chronology
← Previous "Like a Keith in the Night"	Next → —
- Peacemaker season 2

"Full Nelson" is the eighth and final episode of the second season of the American black comedy, superhero, drama television series Peacemaker. It is the sixteenth and final episode overall. "Full Nelson" was written and directed by series creator James Gunn, and originally aired on HBO Max on October 9, 2025. In the episode, following his imprisonment, Chris Smith / Peacemaker (John Cena) has given up on being a hero. Chris's team, the 11th Street Kids, try to return to normal life while Sasha Bordeaux (Sol Rodríguez) discovers the true plan of Rick Flag Sr. (Frank Grillo) with the Quantum Unfolding Chamber.

The episode received mixed reviews from critics, who praised its performances and emotional moments, but were polarized over its cliffhanger conclusion and criticized the slow pacing.

== Plot ==
In a flashback, one month in the past, Chris and Harcourt talk at a diner. Harcourt reveals she has been fired from A.R.G.U.S. and is "no longer special", but Chris disagrees. Chris decides to take Harcourt to a nearby Nelson concert on a boat; they dance and later kiss, but Harcourt leaves immediately, disappointing Chris.

In the present, Chris is incarcerated while awaiting his court date and refuses to accept visits from the 11th Street Kids. Using confiscated drug money, Adebayo bails out Chris, who takes his pet eagle, Eagly, and leaves town. A.R.G.U.S. has seized ownership of the alien device, allowing them to access and lock doors in the Quantum Unfolding Chamber, granting them access to the multiverse. Harcourt and Fleury are sent to inspect a universe in a door, but they are attacked by small creatures that kills A.R.G.U.S. agent Kline, forcing them to retreat. Economos grows disillusioned with the project because A.R.G.U.S. head Rick Flag Sr. is using Lex Luthor's team and tells Lex about the doors. After discovering dangerous dimensions wherein many agents are killed, A.R.G.U.S. eventually finds a habitable planet they name "Salvation", and Flag Sr. pitches this to the government as a prison for metahumans, feeling prisons like Arkham and Belle Reve lack the resources. This is accepted but Bordeaux dislikes the idea and secretly meets with Harcourt to reveal the project, and cooperates with the Kids to locate Chris. They find Chris at a motel and talk to him about his importance in their lives. As they leave, Chris asks Harcourt if their night at the boat meant something to her. Harcourt says the night did mean something, at which Chris celebrates in private.

One week later, the 11th Street Kids, alongside Fleury, Bordeaux, and Judomaster, have started a new agency called Checkmate. Chris and Harcourt are dating and attend a Foxy Shazam concert together. As Chris returns to his motel, he is kidnapped by A.R.G.U.S. operatives and brought before Flag. They take Chris to the door to Salvation, and Flag reveals he faked Chris's signature so he could be used as a test before any metahuman is brought in. They shove Chris through the door and close it on him, trapping him in Salvation.

== Production ==
In February 2022, when Peacemaker was renewed for a second season, James Gunn was confirmed as the writer for all episodes. "Full Nelson" was written and directed by Gunn, and marks Gunn's 16th writing credit and his eighth directing credit for the series. Two weeks before the episode aired, Gunn said a third season was unlikely to happen, but there were plans for the characters in other media. When asked about a hypothetical third season, Gunn said the characters would be returning "soon" and that "that doesn't mean that there won't be. I don't want to ... never say never. But right now, no." "Full Nelson" introduces the concepts of Checkmate and the planet Salvation, ideas that originate from the 2007 limited series comic book Salvation Run by Bill Willingham and Lilah Sturges. Gunn stated he had planned the story arc of Peacemaker's first and second seasons before signing as co-chairman of DC Studios. Gunn noted the introduction of Checkmate and Salvation in particular, saying: "those were things that I had pitched to everybody before we ever came into DC and then after we came into DC and we met with the writers room and worked things out a little bit more". He also stated the two would be "instrumental" to the overarching story of the DC Universe (DCU), particularly the upcoming HBO Max television series Lanterns.

Several rock music songs are featured in the episode; these include including "Someone Special" by Hardcore Superstar, "Fucking My Heart in the Ass" by Steel Panther, "We're Not Gonna Take It" by Dee Snider, "Only My Heart Talkin'" by Alice Cooper, "Reckoning" by Cruel Intentions, "To Get Back to You" by Nelson, and "Oh Lord" by Foxy Shazam. The bands Nelson and Foxy Shazam also make cameo appearances in the episode. Gunn pitched to Ryan Reynolds the idea of having his X-Men film series and Marvel Cinematic Universe (MCU) character Wade Wilson / Deadpool make a cameo in the episode. Had the idea gone forward, the Peacemaker characters would have opened a door in the Quantum Unfolding Chamber to find Wilson. While Reynolds approved the idea, Gunn could not enact it because they would have needed to "go through some pretty, pretty big hoops to do that".

== Release and critical reception ==
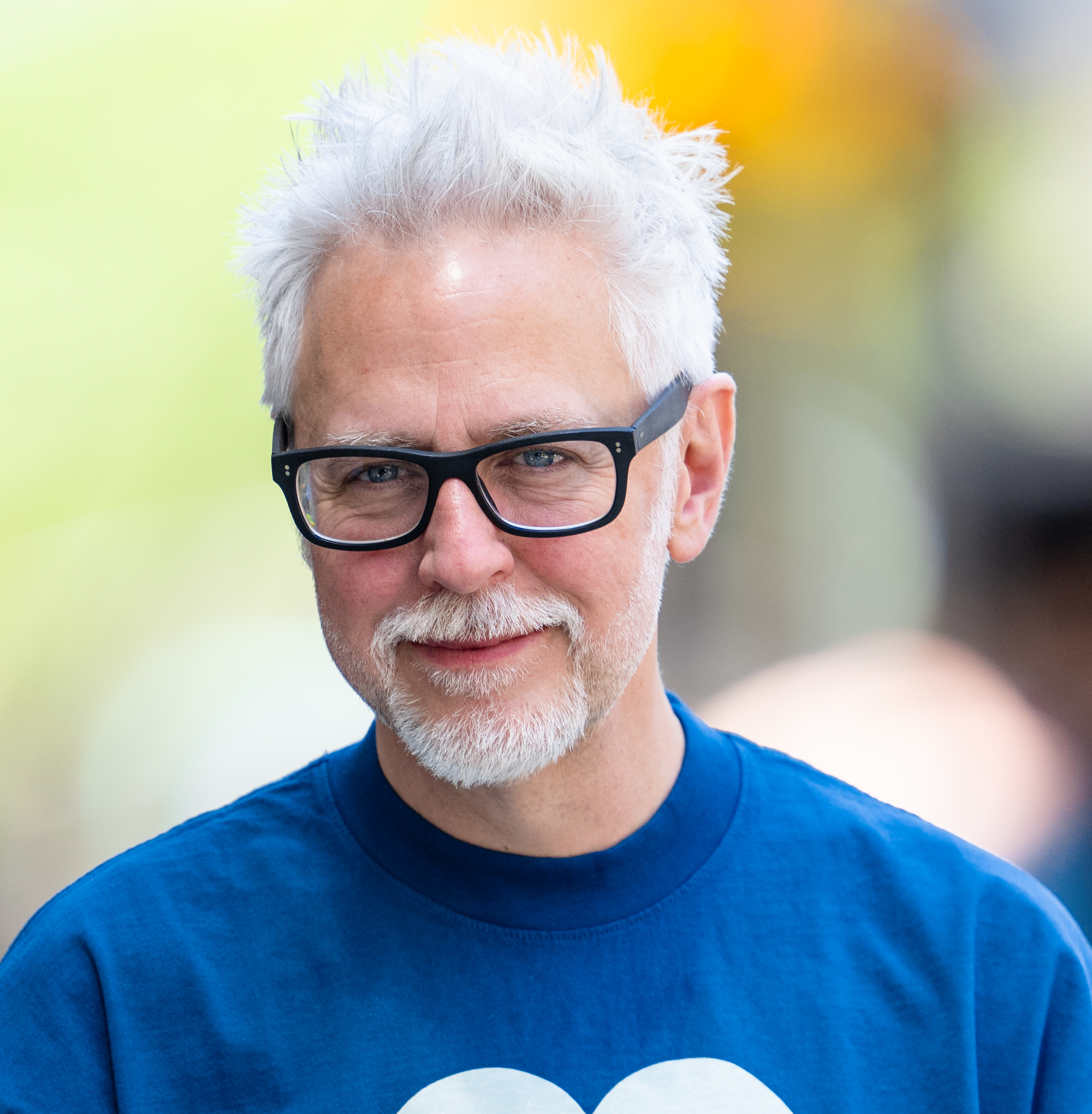
Writer and director James Gunn on the set of Superman in Cleveland, Ohio, in 2024.

"Full Nelson" was first released on October 9, 2025, on the streaming service HBO Max, and received mixed reviews from critics. On the review aggregator website Rotten Tomatoes, 50% of 8 critics' reviews are positive, with an average rating of 5.7/10.

Scott Collura of IGN rated the episode 6 out of 10. He described it as a "mixed bag", writing it "manages to wrap-up the Chris/Harcourt relationship dilemma in a finely acted and emotionally satisfying way, while short-changing most of the rest of the cast". Collura criticized the role of Frank Grillo's Rick Flag Sr. as feeling "unearned", and said he was interested to see where the story progressed in future DCU projects. Jarrod Jones of The A.V. Club graded the episode an "A". He praised the episode's ending, noting it gives the series closure while setting up future story arcs for Peacemaker. Writing for Vulture, Scott Meslow said the episode is a lackluster conclusion, noting it serves primarily to establish elements for the DCU. Meslow also praised the resolution of the romantic subplot between Chris and Harcourt, and rated the episode two stars out of five. Joe George of Den of Geek wrote: "if there's one thing Gunn knows how to do, it's surprising us with his comic book takes. The existence of Salvation in the DCU proves that." He noted Gunn's adaption of Salvation Run is an odd choice given the largely negative reception of the comic.
