= List of Checkmate members =

Checkmate is a fictional covert operations agency, as published by DC Comics.

The roster of the agency has changed a great deal over the years. These roster lists are of the members during the agency's various incarnations.

The codenames listed under Character are those used during the time frame of the particular iteration. Characters with more than one codename for that period have them listed chronologically and separated by a slash (/). Bolded names in the most recent iteration published are the current agency members.

First appearance is the place where the character first appeared as a member of a particular iteration. It is not necessarily the first appearance of the character in print, nor the story depicting how the character joined the agency.

All information is listed in publication order first, then rank, and finally alphabetical.

== Roster during Checkmate! ==
Character	Real name	Position	First appearance	Notes
Harry Stein	N/A	King	Action Comics #598 (March 1988)	
Harvey Bullock	N/A	Bishop	Action Comics #598 (March 1988)	Also member of the GCPD.
Grace Guinness	N/A	Rook	Action Comics #598 (March 1988)	
Amanda Waller	N/A	Queen	Checkmate! #1 (April 1988)	Concurrent leader of the Suicide Squad.
Phil Kramer	N/A	Bishop	Checkmate! #1 (April 1988)	
Scott Jameson	N/A	Bishop	Checkmate! #1 (April 1988)	
John Reed	N/A	Pawn / Knight	Checkmate! #1 (April 1988)	Promoted to Knight in Checkmate! #6 (August 1988).
Gary Washington	N/A	Knight	Checkmate! #1 (April 1988)	
Winston Churchill O'Donnell	N/A	Knight	Checkmate! #4 (July 1988)	
Kalia Campbell	N/A	Rook	Checkmate! #4 (July 1988)	
Mr. Wing	N/A	Rook	Checkmate! #4 (July 1988)	
Jack Wyznowski	N/A	Rook	Checkmate! #5 (August 1988)	
Jake Tyler	N/A	Knight	Checkmate! #5 (August 1988)	
Abe Crane	N/A	Rook	Checkmate! #9 (December 1988)	
Roger Dayton	N/A	Knight	Checkmate! #9 (December 1988)	
Rene Rockwell	N/A	Pawn	Checkmate! #9 (December 1988)	Killed in Checkmate! #10 (Winter 1988).
Connie Webb	N/A	Knight	Checkmate! #12 (February 1989)	
Valentina Vostok	N/A	Bishop	Checkmate! #15 (May 1989)	Former member of the Doom Patrol.
Ray Carson	N/A	Knight	Checkmate! #15 (May 1989)	
Jacques Reynard	N/A	Knight	Checkmate! #17 (June 1989)	
Peacemaker	Christopher Smith	Field agent	Suicide Squad #30 (June 1989)	Project Peacemaker integrated into Checkmate following The Janus Directive.; Died in Eclipso #13 (November 1993).
Dr. Bridgette D'Abo	N/A	Psychologist	Suicide Squad #30 (June 1989)	Project Peacemaker integrated into Checkmate following The Janus Directive.
Jerry Blake	N/A	Knight	Checkmate! #19 (July 1989)	
Conrad Mackay	N/A	Knight	Checkmate! #21 (October 1989)	
Black Thorn	Elizabeth Thorne	Field agent	Between Checkmate! #26 (March 1990) and #28 (June 1990)	
Mark Nagoya	N/A	Knight	Checkmate! #30 (August 1990)	
Deadshot	Floyd Lawton	Freelance	?	Former member of the Suicide Squad.; Later member of the Secret Six.
Deathstroke	Slade Wilson	Freelance	?	Later member of: The Society; Titans East
Vigilante	Adrian Chase	Freelance	?	Died in Vigilante #50 (February 1988).
Vigilante	Pat Trayce	Freelance	?	
Vixen	Mari McCabe	Freelance	?	Former member of the Suicide Squad.; Former and later member of the Justice League.

== Roster between series ==
Character	Real name	Position	First appearance	Notes
Phil Kramer	N/A	King	Deathstroke, the Terminator #17 (December 1992)	Promoted from Bishop to King in Deathstroke, the Terminator #17.
Kalia Campbell	N/A	Bishop / Queen	Deathstroke, the Terminator #17 (December 1992)	Referenced as a Bishop in Who's Who in the DC Universe #7.; Promoted to Queen in Deathstroke, the Terminator #17.
Gary Washington	N/A	Knight	Deathstroke, the Terminator #17 (December 1992)	
Jack Wyznowski	N/A	Rook	Deathstroke, the Terminator #18 (January 1993)	
Arsenal	Roy Harper	Knight	Deathstroke, the Terminator #18 (January 1993)	Working with Cheshire in order to infiltrate the Brotherhood of Evil; betrays Cheshire later on.; Former member of the Teen Titans.; Later member of: The Titans; The Outsiders; Justice League of America
Winston Churchill O'Donnell	N/A	Knight	Deathstroke, the Terminator #19 (February 1993)	
David Said	N/A	King	Detective Comics #768 (May 2002)	
Jessica Midnight	N/A	Black Queen's Knight	Detective Comics #773 (October 2002)	
Sasha Bordeaux	N/A	Black King's Knight	Detective Comics #773 (October 2002)	
Huntress	Helena Bertinelli	Queen	Gotham Knights #38 (April 2003)	Former member of the Justice League.; Later member of: Birds of Prey; The Outsiders
Maxwell Lord	N/A	Black King	DC Countdown #1 (May 2005)	Former financier of the Justice League.; Died in Wonder Woman vol. 2, #219 (September 2005).
Patricia Grace-Colby	N/A	Black Queen	The OMAC Project #2 (July 2005)	
Ahmed Samsarra	N/A	White King	The OMAC Project #2 (July 2005)	
Oksana Verchenko	N/A	White Queen	The OMAC Project #2 (July 2005)	

== Roster during Checkmate vol. 2 ==
Character	Real name	Position	First appearance	Notes
Taleb Beni Khalid	N/A	Black King	Checkmate vol. 2, #1 (June 2006)	Seconded from Israeli Defence Forces.
Shen Li Po	N/A	Black King's Bishop	Checkmate vol. 2, #1 (June 2006)	Leave of absence in issue #16 (September 2007).
Fire	Beatriz Bonilla da Costa	Black King's Knight	Checkmate vol. 2, #1 (June 2006)	Former member of: Global Guardians; Justice League
Sasha Bordeaux	N/A	Black Queen	Checkmate vol. 2, #1 (June 2006)	
Jessica Midnight	N/A	Black Queen's Bishop	Checkmate vol. 2, #1 (June 2006)	British National.; Possess some degree of magicks that are kept hidden from the rest of Checkmate, excluding Fire.
Jonah McCarthy	N/A	Black Queen's Knight	Checkmate vol. 2, #1 (June 2006)	Died in issue #1 (June 2006).
Green Lantern	Alan Scott	White King	Checkmate vol. 2, #1 (June 2006)	Concurrent member of the Justice Society of America; forced to resign by UN Security Council in issue #4 (September 2006).
Mister Terrific	Michael Holt	White King's Bishop / White King	Checkmate vol. 2, #1 (June 2006)	Concurrent member of the Justice Society of America.
Thomas Jagger	N/A	White King's Knight	Checkmate vol. 2, #1 (June 2006)	
Amanda Waller	N/A	White Queen	Checkmate vol. 2, #1 (June 2006)	Resigned from Checkmate in issue #20 (November 2007).
King Faraday	N/A	White Queen's Bishop	Checkmate vol. 2, #1 (June 2006)	Resigned from Checkmate in issue #20 (November 2007).
Count Vertigo	Werner Vertigo	White Queen's Knight	Checkmate vol. 2, #1 (June 2006)	Current member of the Suicide Squad.; Resigned from Checkmate in issue #20 (November 2007).
Mademoiselle Marie	Josephine Tautin	Black Queen's Knight	Checkmate vol. 2, #5 (October 2006)	Former member of the DGSE.
Pawn 502	Lucas Terrel	Pawn	Checkmate vol. 2, #8 (January 2007)	Infiltrated Kobra organization.; Died shortly after being lifted when cover was blown in issue #23 (February 2008).
Thinker	N/A	White King's Bishop	Checkmate vol. 2, #9 (February 2007)	
August General in Iron	Fang Zhifu	Black King's Bishop	Checkmate vol. 2, #16 (September 2007)	Seconded from the Great Ten.
Master Jailer	Carl Draper	Castellan	Checkmate vol. 2, #17 (October 2007)	
Valentina Vostok	N/A	White Queen	Checkmate vol. 2, #21 (December 2007)	Apparently KIA in Final Crisis #4 attempting to retake Blüdhaven from Darkseid's forces.
Bad Samaritan	Zviad Baazovi	White Queen's Bishop	Checkmate vol. 2 #22 (March 2008)	A Georgian National.
Rocket Red #1	Maks Chazov	White Queen's Knight	Checkmate vol. 2 #22 (March 2008)	Member of the Rocket Red Brigade.
Gravedigger	CWO2 Tyson Sykes	Rook	Checkmate vol. 2, #24 (May 2008)	Designation: **Rook Alpha**.
Cinnamon	N/A	Rook	Checkmate vol. 2, #24 (May 2008)	Designation: **Rook Beta**.
Faust	Sebastian Faust	Rook	Checkmate vol. 2, #24 (May 2008)	Checkmate's mystic consultant.; Designation: **Rook Gamma**.
G.I. Robot	J.A.K.E. #6.1	Rook	Checkmate vol. 2, #24 (May 2008)	Designation: **Rook Delta**.
Snapper Carr	Lucas Carr	Pawn	52 Aftermath: The Four Horsemen #3 (December 2007)	
Pawn 905	Bell	Pawn	Faces of Evil: Kobra #1 (March 2009)	Revealed to be Kobra who infiltrated Checkmate with Pawn 905's identity.
Agent Samura	N/A	Pawn	JSA vs. Kobra #1 (August 2009)	Killed by undercover Kobra agents who infiltrated Checkmate.
Samuel Lacina	N/A	Pawn	JSA vs. Kobra #3 (October 2009)	Killed by Kobra agents and stored in a janitor's closet in the JSA Brownstone.

== Roster during Checkmate vol. 3 ==
Character	Real name	Position	First appearance	Notes
Green Arrow	Oliver Queen			
Talia al Ghul	N/A			
Lois Lane	N/A			
Manhunter	Kate Spencer			
Mister Bones	Robert Todd			
Question	Vic Sage			
Steve Trevor	N/A			

== In other media ==
=== Smallville ===
Checkmate members from Smallville
Character	Real name	Actor	First appearance	Notes
Amanda Waller		Pam Grier	Smallville 9x12 "Absolute Justice, Part II"	
Tess Mercer		Cassidy Freeman	Smallville 8x1 "Odyssey"	
Maxwell Lord		Gil Bellows	Smallville 9x18 "Charade"	
Martha Kent		Annette O'Toole	Smallville 1x1 "Pilot"	

=== DC Universe ===
Checkmate members from the DC Universe
Character	Real name	Actor	First appearance	Notes
Peacemaker	Chris Smith	John Cena	Peacemaker 2x8 "Full Nelson"	
Leota Adebayo		Danielle Brooks	Peacemaker 2x8 "Full Nelson"	
Vigilante	Adrian Chase	Freddie Stroma	Peacemaker 2x8 "Full Nelson"	
Emilia Harcourt		Jennifer Holland	Peacemaker 2x8 "Full Nelson"	
John Economos		Steve Agee	Peacemaker 2x8 "Full Nelson"	
Sasha Bordeaux		Sol Rodríguez	Peacemaker 2x8 "Full Nelson"	
Langston Fleury		Tim Meadows	Peacemaker 2x8 "Full Nelson"	
Judomaster	Rip Jagger	Nhut Le	Peacemaker 2x8 "Full Nelson"	
Eagly		Dee Bradley Baker	Peacemaker 2x8 "Full Nelson"	

=== DC Universe Online ===
Checkmate members from DC Universe Online
Character	Real name	Actor	First appearance	Notes
Fire	Beatriz da Costa	Shawn Sides	DC Universe Online	
Green Lantern	Alan Scott	Jason Phelps	DC Universe Online	
Toyman	Winslow P. Schott	Matt Hislope	DC Universe Online	
Harvey Bullock		Edwin Neal	DC Universe Online	
Green Arrow	Oliver Queen	David Jennison	DC Universe Online	
Talia al Ghul		Ellie McBride	DC Universe Online	
Vixen	Mari Jiwe		DC Universe Online	
Steve Trevor		Sean Donellan	DC Universe Online	
Lois Lane		Adriene Mishler	DC Universe Online	
