= Great Ten =

Superheroes in the DC Comics Universe

- The Great Ten, artist Stanley “Artgerm” Lau.

Publication information
- Publisher: DC Comics
- First appearance: 52 #6 (June 2006)
- Created by: Grant Morrison (writer); J. G. Jones (artist); Joe Bennett (artist)

In-story information
- Base(s): Great Wall Complex, China
- Member(s): Accomplished Perfect Physician; August General in Iron; Celestial Archer; Ghost Fox Killer; Immortal Man in Darkness; Mother of Champions; Seven Deadly Brothers; Shaolin Robot; Socialist Red Guardsman; Thundermind; Thunderstrike

The Great Ten (Shi Hao Xia) or (十豪侠) are a team of Chinese comic book superheroes in the DC Comics Universe, who are sponsored by the government of the People's Republic of China. They were introduced in 52 (June 2006), and created by Grant Morrison, J. G. Jones, and Joe Bennett. Several of the characters have a basis in Chinese mythology. Unlike conventional superhero monikers, their names are close to literal translations from the Chinese language.

== Publication history ==
Grant Morrison explained the background to his creation of the team, in a pitch that also contained the outline for the Super Young Team:

I'm pleased with the introduction of the Great Ten who grew out Paul Levitz' desire to see more international superheroes. After the first 52 story meeting I went home, dug out the reference material on Chinese history and culture I'd used to help create the backstory for the 'Xorn' character in New X-Men and hammered out a huge document complete with detailed origin stories and backgrounds for every member of the Great Ten, as well as some details of the Chinese Government's 'super-functionary' program.

The Great Ten returned in their own title, in a ten-issue monthly miniseries, beginning in early November 2009 and produced by writer Tony Bedard and artist Scott McDaniel, with covers by Stanley Lau.

== Fictional team biography ==
First appearing in 52 #6, the Great Ten's actions are hampered by bureaucracy. Three of the team's members were forced to sit out a battle with Green Lanterns Hal Jordan and John Stewart because they had not completed the required paperwork. Following the events in the Infinite Crisis story arc, as a signatory of the Freedom of Power Treaty China has entered into a coalition with Kahndaq, Iran, Uzbekistan, and Pakistan, leading the Great Ten to join forces with Black Adam on the battlefield. Later, in week #32, Accomplished Perfect Physician saves Ralph Dibny from his rampaging teammate Yeti, and gains his help subduing and restoring him to his human self. The Accomplished Perfect Physician then shares with Dibny details about his life and powers, his role as a "super-functionary", and cryptic advice about a coming crisis in the Middle East. The Great Ten later battle Black Adam when he invades China as part of his vendetta after the death of Isis in World War III. This also involves confrontations with several American superheroes, as the Chinese government was willing to go so far as to launch nuclear missiles if their territory was violated. This portion of the stand-off was ended when the Great Ten lost contact with Beijing, leaving August General in Iron with the authority to allow international help - against his own wishes.

On the final page of Checkmate #3, the Checkmate ground team, on an infiltration mission in China, is discovered and cornered by The Immortal Man in Darkness. In Checkmate #4 the August General in Iron, Celestial Archer and Yao Fei the Accomplished Perfect Physician show up to support the Immortal Man in Darkness, after a brief skirmish both sides declare a truce. Later, after Yao prevents Count Vertigo (acting under secret orders from Amanda Waller) from stealing Chinese state secrets, the August General decides that Checkmate has betrayed the truce and orders their deaths, only the timely intervention of Green Lantern Alan Scott and the Chinese ambassador saves the lives of Sasha's ground team.

In Checkmate #13-15 and Outsiders #47-49, the Checkmate team and the Outsiders are on an infiltration mission to Oolong Island. In Outsiders #48, they are attacked by Immortal Man in Darkness and Chang Tzu has re-appeared, ready to experiment on Sasha Bordeaux and Captain Boomerang.

The Great Ten also received a self-titled miniseries that revealed the respective histories of its members.

In Doomsday Clock, the Great Ten expand into the Great Twenty, with additional members including Gloss, Dao, Guanxi, Night-Dragon, Ri, and Striker-Z.

== Membership ==
=== Accomplished Perfect Physician ===
Accomplished Perfect Physician (Yao Fei) was born a peasant in the Anhui Province. He had dreams of becoming a doctor but lacked the money for medical school and enlisted in the army instead. When his unit was sent to suppress an uprising in Gyantse, Tibet, Yao killed a monk named Tenzin Cering. Horrified at what he had done, he deserted his unit and was shot by his commanding officer. He was saved by a local medicine man who told Yao that his son, Tenzin, was supposed to be the seventeenth man to hold the position of the "Accomplished Perfect Physician"; since Tenzin was now dead, Yao was forced to take his place by Tenzin's father. Tenzin tossed Yao through a magical portal, where he was filled with the memories and powers of the past Physicians. As the new Accomplished Perfect Physician, Yao was branded an outlaw and an enemy of the state for many years before he willingly joined the Great Ten.

With simple vocal sounds, the Accomplished Perfect Physician can produce a variety of magical effects, such as paralysis, force fields, energy manipulation, healing, destruction of matter, and earthquakes.

=== August General in Iron ===
August General in Iron (Fang Zhifu) is a former member of the "Xeno-Team", an elite Chinese spec ops unit trained for encounters with aliens. 15 years ago, his unit was sent to investigate a Durlan ship that crashed in Qinghai province. The Durlans wiped out his unit with a flesh-melting pathogen weapon. Fang barely survived by injecting himself with a counter-agent that slowed the degeneration. Chinese scientists subjected him to special treatments which saved his life, but also endowed him with superhuman strength and caused his skin to grow iron-like plates. He was then recruited into China's new metahuman division. He wields a staff that can easily slice through metal.

August General in Iron is the field leader of the Great Ten and while he commands the Great Ten, he must still run all command decisions in the field by the Central Committee. He also serves as the Black King's Bishop in Checkmate. He is the lover of Ghost Fox Killer and is immune to her death touch. As a fanatical soldier, he despises the Accomplished Perfect Physician for his irreverent attitude and for deserting the army.

In The New 52 continuity reboot, August General in Iron is invited to join the new Justice League International, with the United Nations council that assembled the group noting that he was selected because he represents "the world's most populous nation". His comments about the superiority of Chinese engineering quickly draw the ire of Rocket Red.

=== Celestial Archer ===
The Celestial Archer (Xu Tao) is a figure with ties to Chinese mythology. As a teenager, Xu Tao sold souvenirs at the foot of Mount Tai. After his father's business was shut down by corrupt police, he joined a gang to support his family. He was not a good thief, however, and a botched robbery landed his fellow gang members in jail. When they were released, they sought his death. They chased him to an old temple below Mount Tai. While hiding behind a tree, Tao was swallowed up by the earth, and found himself in a cavern where he found the Celestial Bow of Yi. The magical bow begged Tao to take it as his own, as it was dying after four thousand years of disuse. When Tao picked it up, he was transformed into the Celestial Archer and granted Yi the Archer's godlike archery skills. After chasing away his former gang, he instinctively fired an arrow at the moon, creating a magical bridge that took him to the home of the Chinese gods. The gods tasked him to serve as their agent on Earth, to inspire the Chinese and remind them of the old gods, whose worship was suppressed by the Communist government.

The Celestial Archer has unerring aim capable of shooting arrows charged with a mysterious energy and turning day into night.

=== Ghost Fox Killer ===
The Ghost Fox Killer is a female emissary from the hidden colony of "Ghost Fox Women". She is charged with killing evil men, and has power over the ghosts of those men. Her home city is powered by the souls of evil men, and her touch causes instant death. She is typically accompanied by a rui shi (or Imperial guardian lion) of living jade. If Ghost Fox Killer does not kill off evil men for her colony, her society will fall. She encounters August General in Iron early in her career, and is stunned to discover that she can touch his body without killing him. She has demonstrated undefined feelings of loyalty towards him.

=== Immortal Man-in-Darkness ===
Fifteen years ago, a Durlan ship crashed in China's Qinghai province. The Chinese reverse-engineered the craft and used the technology to build the Dragonwing, the most advanced fighter plane in the world. The pilot sits in a cockpit filled with a sort of amniotic fluid, bonding themselves to the craft. This bond gradually breaks down the pilot's molecular structure, with each flight taking a year from their life. The Dragonwing has been flown by a succession of PLAAF pilots, all of whom knowingly sacrificed themselves to serve China as the Immortal Man-In-Darkness. The current pilot is Chen Nuo.

=== Mother of Champions ===
The Mother of Champions (Wu Mei-Xing) is a former theoretical physicist who was working on a particle accelerator when she was briefly exposed to a theoretical "god particle", which activated her metagene. At first she was unable to bear children, but eventually discovered her super-fecundity powers by accident. Wu is immune to radiation and able to birth twenty-five genetically identical supersoldiers about every three days. These children are short-lived, however, only lasting one week, aging ten years every day. She has at times used a metallic chair with insect-like legs to remain mobile while pregnant.

One of her superstrong children named Number Four appeared in The OMAC Project: Infinite Crisis Special #1. In Nightwing #144, Mother of Champions is kidnapped from by operatives of Talia al Ghul; in this same issue it is revealed that she has had thousands of children, and that each batch of superhuman children are conceived by suitors whom she hand picks. Her children appear to demonstrate fairly standard superhuman abilities, save for when she has children with fellow Great Ten members.

=== Seven Deadly Brothers ===
Yang Kei-Ying, known as the Seven Deadly Brothers, was born in poverty in Fujian province over 300 years ago. He was a soldier in service to the Yongzheng Emperor in 1723, and took part in the destruction of the Shaolin Temple. One of the temple's kung fu grandmasters, Bak Mei, defected to the Emperor and helped destroy the second temple. Yang was impressed with Bak Mei's skill and wanted to learn kung fu himself, but Bak Mei laughed at him and thought him unpromising. He deserted the army and headed to the school of the Seven Scribes of the Cloudy Satchel, seven taoist sorcerers in the mountains near Song Shan. Yang begged to become a pupil and fed the sorcerers all manner of excuses and lies, but the sorcerers saw through him and placed a curse on him as punishment for his evil actions. Yang was given the ability to split into seven clones, each a master of one type of kung fu, then sent back to slaughter Bak Mei and the soldiers who had destroyed the Shaolin temples. Centuries later, he was incorporated into the Great Ten and fabricated his origin, claiming that he received his powers from an old mystic whom he saved from a beating.

=== Shaolin Robot ===
When the First Emperor of China commissioned the construction of his tomb, a brilliant engineer by the name of Lao Yuqi built a hundred clockwork automatons to serve as tomb guards. The vain and jealous emperor ordered that Lao be entombed with him upon his death so that his genius would never serve another patron. Before dying of thirst, Lao reprogrammed one of the automatons with his own insights, values and priorities and gave it a semblance of free will. Thousands of years later, when the tomb was uncovered by archaeologists, the automatons went on a rampage in an attempt to topple the Communist government and restore imperial rule. These automatons were defeated by the Super Functionaries. Only Lao's reprogrammed automaton remained inactive back at the tomb. The Chinese government reactivated it and upgraded it with Durlan technology.

Shaolin Robot speaks in simple I Ching hexagrams, but can express more complex thoughts using written pinyin.

=== Socialist Red Guardsman ===
Real name Gu Lao, Socialist Red Guardsman is one of the oldest Chinese heroes. He used his solar powers to carry out the Cultural Revolution. His body is highly radioactive, so he is forced to wear special armor reverse engineered from Durlan technology. He has since become bitter and disillusioned as China abandons Mao Zedong's vision and embraces market economics. He lives like a hermit in an isolated stretch of the Gobi Desert due to the possible threat of a nuclear meltdown. Mother of Champions is immune to his radiation, and was the first person to touch him in over fifteen years.

=== Thundermind ===
Thundermind or 雷念 (Léi Niàn) is Zou Kang, a history teacher at Beijing No. 8 Middle School who, on a tour of the Beijing Museum, accidentally recites aloud a Sanskrit "trigger phrase" from an ancient Buddhist artifact. Zou transforms into Thundermind whenever he recites his trigger phrase and unlocks what he calls his full human potential, becoming a Bodhisattva with the power to access metahuman analogues of the powers listed in the Buddhist siddhis. He also has super-senses akin to telepathy, and fancies himself the team's conscience.

== Reserve members ==
=== Chang Tzu ===
Chang Tzu and his Science Squad are allies and financial supporters of the Great Ten.

=== Number Four ===
Number Four is one of the Mother of Champions' children. He is based on the myth of the Ten Brothers, with the fourth possessing invincibility and elasticity.

=== Shen Li Po ===
Shen Li Po was formerly the Black King's Bishop in Checkmate. Shen returned to the Great Wall Complex on a leave of absence and was replaced by August General In Iron.

=== The Yeti ===
Hu Wei is a scientist who unlocked an atavistic trigger gene that gave him the ability to transform into a powerful yeti-like monster plagued with an uncontrollable rage. While in his Yeti form, Hu wears a special electronic amulet around his neck to keep him from going berserk. He is killed by Black Adam in 52.

== Other versions ==
- The Most Unworthy Ten, a villainous counterpart of the Great Ten from the antimatter universe, appears in Trinity.
- An alternate universe version of August General in Iron who is a member of H.I.V.E. appears in Flashpoint.

== In other media ==
- Yao Fei, with elements of Celestial Archer, appears in Arrow, portrayed by Byron Mann. This version is a martial artist, archer, and Oliver Queen's mentor. He is killed by Eddie Fyers in the episode "Darkness on the Edge of Town".
- The Great Ten appear as character summons in Scribblenauts Unmasked: A DC Comics Adventure.
- The Great Ten appear in Batman: The Brave and the Bold #8, consisting of Accomplished Perfect Physician, Celestial Archer, August General In Iron, and Yeti.
