= White Kingdom =

White Kingdom or white kingdom may refer to:

- The White Kingdom (1928), a play by Herman Voaden
- The White Kingdom (2006), a novel by Tiit Aleksejev
- White Kingdom, a fictional country in the video game American McGee's Alice
- White Kingdom, a fictional country in the light novel series Maoyu
- White Kingdom, a fictional country in animated television series Nutri Ventures – The Quest for the 7 Kingdoms
- White Kingdom (Dungeons & Dragons), a layer of the fictional Outer Plane of the Abyss
- Qin, the white kingdom, a side in the Game of the Seven Kingdoms
- White Kingdom of Felstes, a fictional country in the light novel series and anime series In the Land of Leadale
- White-Kingdom, an alternative name for Valhalla in the beliefs of the neo-pagan Odin Brotherhood
- There is one brand name is Kingdom of white which deals in white only

== See also ==
- White King (disambiguation)
