= Checkmate (comics) =

DC Comics covert operations agency

- Artwork for the cover of Checkmate (vol. 2) #4 (September 2006), art by Lee Bermejo

Publication information
- Publisher: DC Comics
- First appearance: Action Comics #598 (March 1988)
- Created by: Paul Kupperberg; Steve Erwin

In-story information
- Type of organization: Intelligence agency
- Base(s): Konig Industries, Shelby, Virginia; NORAD facility in the Colorado Rocky Mountains; "The Castle" compound in the Swiss Alps

Roster

Checkmate is a fictional covert operations agency appearing in American comic books published by DC Comics. The antihero team first appeared in Action Comics #598 (March 1988) and proceeded to have its own ongoing title in Checkmate! (April 1988 to January 1991). In the wake of events depicted in the mini-series The OMAC Project and Infinite Crisis, Checkmate is re-chartered as a United Nations Security Council-affiliated agency and was again given its own series, Checkmate (vol. 2; June 2006 to December 2008).

== Publication history ==
Cover to Checkmate #33, the series' final issue

The Checkmate organization was created by Paul Kupperberg and Steve Erwin, first appearing in Action Comics #598 (March 1988). The precursor to this fictional organization was known as the Agency, first appearing in Vigilante #36. Harry Stein was appointed Valentina Vostok's replacement in The Agency's command position by Amanda Waller. Stein later sought out the most stable personnel available from the American and international intelligence and law enforcement communities to form Checkmate. His agency would field only the best-trained and well-equipped of agents, working under the strictest rules of secrecy. For the organizational structure of the re-organized Agency, Stein chose the game of chess as his working model.

Stein brought in Gary Washington (Knight One) and Black Thorn as Checkmate operatives, both of whom were his friends, and both of whom were introduced during his run on Vigilante.

Checkmate! was at various times involved with the other government agencies in the DC Comics universe, primarily the Suicide Squad, which resulted in the crossover "The Janus Directive". Checkmate! was canceled after 33 issues but the organization continued to appear, mostly in titles related to either the government or Batman.

After the events of the mini-series The OMAC Project, a precursor to the Infinite Crisis limited series, the Checkmate organization was re-organized and its title was revived with Checkmate (vol. 2). This volume ended after publication of its 31st issue, dated December 2008.

After the cancellation of the second volume, the team returned in the Final Crisis one-shot tie-in "Resist" by Greg Rucka and Eric Trautmann.

== Biography ==
=== Checkmate! (vol. 1) ===
==== Biography ====
===== Organization and designation =====
The name Checkmate is taken from the winning move in chess, and the agency's hierarchy is modeled after the various pieces of a chess game; one King, one Queen and several Bishops, Rooks, Knights and Pawns. The Bishops oversaw the Rooks behind the scenes while the Rooks planned missions and supervised the field agents, or Knights, and the Knights' support, the Pawns.

==== Known employed operatives ====
List of operatives during first series.

=== History ===
The Agency is first set up by Amanda Waller to serve as a small branch of Task Force X under the command of Colonel Valentina Vostok (formerly Negative Woman of the Doom Patrol) to perform operations worldwide considered vital to the security of American interests. She relinquishes command to Harry Stein, who recreates The Agency into a new image and organization, dubbed Checkmate, in relation to its chess-inspired organizational scheme.

==== "The Janus Directive" ====
Russian Checkmate Knight, artist Gabriel Morrissette

"The Janus Directive" is a crossover storyline that involves an inter-agency war between Checkmate, the Suicide Squad, and Project Atom, who are manipulated by Kobra in order to distract the United States intelligence community from his activities. Checkmate loses at least 38 Knight agents (tallying to more than two thirds of Checkmate's Knight force) and its headquarters (as well as its cover, Konig Industries) in Shelby, Virginia, in the incident. In the aftermath, Sarge Steel takes Waller's place as head of Checkmate, and Checkmate relocates to a new NORAD base in Colorado.

==== Russian Checkmate ====
A Russian version of Checkmate (Russian: Шах и мат) (presumably under the KGB) is introduced in the last issues of the original series run. They are admittedly underfunded, but wear armor similar to their U.S. counterparts.

=== In between volumes ===
==== Biography ====
Checkmate's hierarchy is remodeled in a manner similar to that of Marvel Comics' Hellfire Club (with the organization itself more closely resembling S.H.I.E.L.D.). The chess-motif remains, but there are sets of Kings and Queens, as well as Bishops, Rooks, Knights, and Pawns, divided between a Black and White set. Their functions remain the same, although neither Rooks nor Pawns are seen. Kings and Queens are the head of each department. Bishops oversee plans behind the scenes. Rooks plan missions. Knights carry out the plans in field teams. Pawns assist the Knights on missions, providing surveillance and backup if needed. The structure of Checkmate with two halves, Black (ops) and White (intel), may also be inspired by the CIA's original two separate halves, the Directorate of Operations and Directorate of Intelligence.

==== Known employed operatives ====
List of operatives between series.

=== History ===
==== Deathstroke, the Terminator ====
Sarge Steel reactivates Checkmate in Deathstroke, the Terminator #17, in order to find the comatose Deathstroke (Slade Wilson). Phil Kramer is promoted to King and Kalia Campbell to Queen. Harry Stein is said to be on indefinite leave of absence after his son is shot, and to be spending more time with his family. Gary Washington and two other Knights appear in the story as well (one of whom might be Winston O'Donnel, who appears in Deathstroke, the Terminator #19). Checkmate Knights invade the lair of supervillainess Cheshire in Deathstroke, the Terminator #18, but most are killed by her operatives and a revived Slade Wilson. Just as two Checkmate agents are about to defeat Deathstroke, Roy Harper (at that time also known as Speedy) knocks them down, revealing to be helping Cheshire as a double agent in both Checkmate and the Brotherhood of Evil. The Russian outfit of Checkmate appears when Deathstroke, Cheshire, Speedy and others try to steal a group of nuclear warheads in Russia. It is revealed that Harper called in Checkmate and that he was working on their side all along. Ultimately, Deathstroke is also revealed to be working for the CIA, and joins up with the American and Russian Checkmate to invade Cheshire's base later, after she threatens the world (unleashing a nuclear warhead on Qurac as leverage). They are able to defeat Cheshire, and the warheads are destroyed.

==== "Knight Moves" ====
A man called David Said has taken over the role of King within the organization, and in the "Knight Moves" storyline Checkmate invades the Batcave, in order to recruit the Huntress in the process. On Batman's word, she agrees to temporarily assume the mantle of Queen, using this position to relay information to Batman on at least one occasion.

==== Bruce Wayne - Murderer? ====
After the events of Bruce Wayne: Murderer? and Bruce Wayne: Fugitive, his bodyguard and partner Sasha Bordeaux is framed for the murder of Vesper Fairchild. She is recruited as a Checkmate operative by Jessica Midnight, as the two fake her death and Sasha undergoes plastic surgery.

==== The OMAC Project ====
It is revealed that Maxwell Lord has assumed the position of Black King within the Checkmate organization with the intent of manipulating the agency to kill all metahumans on Earth. While DC did not explain how or when Lord came to power (or had seemingly gone from supporting metahuman involvement in the protection of the planet to this personality), it has been implied that Checkmate may have been the victim of Superboy-Prime, who warped the fabric of reality by punching the walls of his prison in another dimension. Due to Prime's actions, the hierarchy of Checkmate was changed and a changed Maxwell Lord was suddenly in charge of the organization.

In order to hide his activities, which included hijacking and reprogramming to his own purposes the super-spy satellite Brother I that Batman originally built to monitor metahumans, Lord murdered former ally Ted Kord. He also mind-controlled Superman, sending the hero after other former allies such as Batman and Wonder Woman. Wonder Woman then proceeded to kill Lord in order to break his control on Superman's mind, which left Checkmate dismantled as an organization.

==== 52 ====
In 52 Week 24, Martian Manhunter reveals that he has spent months undercover undermining the remnants of Checkmate to convince the President of the U.S. to disband the organization. Within days, however, it is reconstituted as a United Nations agency. In Week 25, Alan Scott reveals to Mister Terrific that he will lead the agency as White King, and asks him to join as well.

=== Checkmate (vol. 2) ===
==== Greg Rucka about Checkmate (vol. 2) ====
Rucka was quoted regarding the new series: "Take a big chunk of The OMAC Project, take the concept of "Who Watches the Watchmen?" and throw in some James Bond and you've got Checkmate". Rucka's stated plans in several interviews include depicting the repurposing of Checkmate as a United Nations-affiliated intelligence/intervention force with a specific purpose of maintaining "balance" between Earth's human and metahuman communities in the wake of events in The OMAC Project and Infinite Crisis.

=== Biography ===
==== Organization and designation ====
Pursuant to UN Security Council Resolution 1696, Checkmate is reorganized as the UN's Chartered Metahuman Monitoring Force. The organization was restructured utilizing the "Rule of Two". Each super-powered or otherwise enhanced member in the "Royal Family" must have an un-powered counterpart in a corresponding position of power. Pawns still remain as low-level field agents. The Rooks make their first appearance in issue #25 as Checkmate's black ops squad (while the Knights are "Special Agents" and Bishops "Advisers"). Specifically they include four operatives of different specialties: Cinnamon, Gravedigger, Sebastian Faust, and G.I. Robot. The Rooks are augmented with DNA from Starro, which gives them a telepathic link with one another. G.I. Robot is assigned to monitor his teammates to make sure they do not lose control. If that situation were to arise, he is supposed to kill them, or as the Black Queen puts it "terminate the link".

The organization's headquarters is a castle in the Swiss Alps known only as "The Castle".

=== History ===
- In A Game of Kings (issues #1-4), the UN votes on Checkmate's existence, but China vetoes this as they are supplying Kobra. Checkmate infiltrates a Chinese base, confronting the Great Ten with aid from Alan Scott, who is removed from the organisation for not embarrassing China.
- In Selection (#5), Black Queen Sasha Bordeaux tests Checkmate agents to select her new Knight (the previous one having died in the first arc). The outgoing White King taps his Bishop, Mister Terrific, as his successor.
- In Rogue Squad (#6-7), a new Suicide Squad hunts down an imprisoned metahuman in Myanmar; despite heavy losses, the Squad frees the prisoner and are rescued by Bronze Tiger and Rick Flag, raising suspicion among the royals due to Waller's involvement.
- In Pawn 502 (#8-10), the Department of Metahuman Affairs arrests a terrorist cell trying to join Kobra, unaware one of the members is a covert Checkmate agent. Checkmate deputizes the Shadowpact to help orchestrate the agent's escape and to get him through Kobra's mystical screening process.
- In Corvalho (#11-12), Waller rigs the Santa Prisca election to stop Bane winning, but Colonel Computron defects to Checkmate with proof of the falsification. Though Tommy Jagger beats Bane, Fire kills Computron under blackmail from Waller.
- In Checkout (#13-15, crossover with Outsiders, alternating with Outsiders #47-49, starting in Checkmate #13 and ending in Outsiders #49), Checkmate abducts the Outsiders, where they are given a deal; they can keep operating if they work for Checkmate. Sasha, Nightwing and Captain Boomerang are captured by Chang Tzu, but are rescued with help from Batman.
- In Past Perfect (#16), Sasha is examined by Doctor Mid-Nite after being tortured, Fire is reunited with Ice and August General in Iron becomes the new Black King's Bishop.
- In Firewall (#17), former villain Carl Draper defends The Castle against a series of assaults and is appointed Castellan, The Castle's chief of security.
- In Fall of the Wall (#18-20), the other Royals continue to gather evidence that Waller is secretly conducting her own covert operations. With the assistance of Martian Manhunter they learn about Operation: "Salvation Run" and succeed in forcing Waller to resign.
- La Vie en Sang (#21-22) explores the history of Mademoiselle Marie and how it connects to the title's current holder, the Black Queen's Knight.
- Castling (#23-25) concludes the plot begun in Pawn 502. Kobra launches a worldwide attack, and Checkmate must deputize the Justice League and activate its Rooks to save the world.
- Chimera (#26-31) brings the series to an end as a shapeshifting bioweapon devised by Checkmate scientists fights an apocalypse of monsters.

==== Brightest Day ====
At the start of the Brightest Day crossover, Maxwell Lord returns from the dead and uses his mental abilities to erase all memories of his existence from everyone on the planet, save for several former members of the Justice League International. Following this, Lord discredits Fire (who is one of the heroes who still remembers him) by forcing everyone at Checkmate to believe that she has failed a psychological evaluation and has begun to show signs of mental instability. Fire is subsequently dismissed from Checkmate by Taleb Beni Khalid. The members of the new Justice League International eventually infiltrate Checkmate headquarters by disguising themselves in stolen Rocket Red suits, but the mission goes awry and they are forced to flee before they can capture Lord. Max eventually tells Blue Beetle that one of the major goals of his plot was to have the Justice League International discredit Checkmate by making them look incompetent, causing the United Nations to pull their funding and fire Khalid and most of the other senior Checkmate higher-ups, leaving Max the opportunity to regain control of the organization.

At the end of the series, Lord is still shown to be in control of Checkmate. He then releases a video onto the internet where he blames the rogue superhero Magog for an accident in Chicago that resulted in the deaths of a thousand civilians, and vows to use Checkmate's resources to keep an eye on similar superheroes and prevent future metahuman catastrophes.

=== Checkmate (vol. 3) ===
As part of "Infinite Frontier", a new series was launched written by Brian Michael Bendis and artist Alex Maleev. Its members are Green Arrow, The King, Lois Lane, Manhunter (Kate Spencer), Mister Bones, the Question, Steve Trevor, and Talia al Ghul.

== In other media ==
=== Television ===
- Two Checkmate factions appear in Smallville, with one consisting of Amanda Waller / White Queen, Tess Mercer, and Maxwell Lord / Black King and the other led by Martha Kent / Red Queen.
- Checkmate appears in My Adventures with Superman, with an as-yet-unidentified operative voiced by Vincent Tong. This version of the organization serves as a benefactor to Task Force X.
- Checkmate appears in the Peacemaker episode "Full Nelson", consisting of founding members Peacemaker, Leota Adebayo, Vigilante, Emilia Harcourt, John Economos, Sasha Bordeaux, Langston Fleury, and Judomaster.

=== Video games ===
- Checkmate appears in DC Universe Online.

== Collected editions ==
#	Title	Publisher	Year	ISBN	Reprints
1	Checkmate: A King's Game	DC Comics	2007	ISBN 1401212204	Collects The reprinted material is, in whole or in part, from: Checkmate (vol. 2) #1-7
1	Credits and full notes: Writer(s) / Greg Rucka; Nunzio DeFilippis; Christina Weir; Penciller(s) / Jesus Saiz; Cliff Richards; Covering the stories "A Game of Kings", "Selection", and "Rogue Squad". A British edition was published by Titan Books — ISBN 1-84576-436-6				Collects The reprinted material is, in whole or in part, from: Checkmate (vol. 2) #1-7
2	Checkmate: Pawn Breaks	DC Comics	2007	ISBN 1401214452	Collects The reprinted material is, in whole or in part, from: Checkmate (vol. 2) #8-12
2	Credits and full notes: Writer(s) / Greg Rucka; Nunzio DeFilippis; Christina Weir; Penciller(s) / Jesus Saiz; Cliff Richards; Steve Scott; Covering the stories "Pawn 502" and "Corvalho". A British edition was published by Titan Books — ISBN 1-84576-603-2				Collects The reprinted material is, in whole or in part, from: Checkmate (vol. 2) #8-12
3	Outsiders/Checkmate: Checkout	DC Comics	2008	ISBN 1401216234	Collects The reprinted material is, in whole or in part, from: Checkmate vol. 2, #13-15; Outsiders (vol. 3) #47-49
3	Credits and full notes: Writer(s) / Greg Rucka; Judd Winick; Penciller(s) / Eddy Barrows; Joe Bennett; Matthew Clark; Ron Randall; Covering the only crossover story of the same name. A British edition was published by Titan Books — ISBN 1-84576-737-3				Collects The reprinted material is, in whole or in part, from: Checkmate vol. 2, #13-15; Outsiders (vol. 3) #47-49
4	Checkmate: Fall of the Wall	DC Comics	2008	ISBN 1401217885	Collects The reprinted material is, in whole or in part, from: Checkmate (vol. 2) #16-22
4	Credits and full notes: Writer(s) / Greg Rucka; Penciller(s) / Jesus Saiz; Covering the stories "Past Perfect", "Firewall", "The Fall of the Wall" and "La Vie en Sang". A British edition was published by Titan Books — ISBN 1-84576-848-5				Collects The reprinted material is, in whole or in part, from: Checkmate (vol. 2) #16-22
5	Checkmate: Chimera	DC Comics	2009	ISBN 1401221351	Collects The reprinted material is, in whole or in part, from: Checkmate (vol. 2) #26-31
5	Credits and full notes: Writer(s) / Bruce Jones; Penciller(s) / Joe Bennett; Manuel Garcia; Covering the story "Chimera".				Collects The reprinted material is, in whole or in part, from: Checkmate (vol. 2) #26-31

Checkmate (vol. 2) #23-25 can be found collected in Kobra: Resurrection - DC Comics - Feb 17 2010.

== See also ==
- List of Checkmate members
- List of government agencies in DC Comics
- Suicide Squad
