= Egg Fu =

Fictional DC Comics supervillain

- Wonder Woman #158 (November 1965), cover art by Ross Andru and Mike Esposito.

Publication information
- Publisher: DC Comics
- First appearance: Wonder Woman #157 (October 1965)
- Created by: Robert Kanigher (writer); Ross Andru (artist)

In-story information
- Alter ego: Edgar Fullerton Yeung; Chang Tzu
- Species: Anthropomorphic egg
- Team affiliations: Intergang; Great Ten; Science Squad
- Notable aliases: Chang Tzu, Egg Fu the Fifth, Dr. Yes
- Abilities: Teleportation device

Egg Fu is a fictional character appearing in DC Comics publications and related media, commonly as an adversary of the superhero Wonder Woman. Most frequently represented as an enormous sentient Chinese egg, he was created by Robert Kanigher and Ross Andru in 1965's Wonder Woman #157, being the first villain in the series to receive a multi-issue arc. Over the years, multiple versions of the character have appeared with varying backstories and alternative names (including Egg Fu the Fifth, Chang Tzu, and Dr. Yes) to battle not only Wonder Woman, but also the Metal Men (as Dr. Yes), Checkmate (as Chang Tzu) and Harley Quinn (as Eggy).

In early appearances, the character was a Yellow Peril ethnic stereotype, complete with caricatured Asian facial features and a strong Chinese accent. Later appearances of the character maintain his Asian ethnicity while de-emphasizing his historically racialized characterization and removing overt associations with Chinese culture and language.

== Publication history ==
Egg Fu was created by Robert Kanigher and Ross Andru. He first appeared in 1965's Wonder Woman #157, and died in the same issue. One year later, Egg Fu the Fifth, a relative of the original Egg Fu, debuts in Wonder Woman #166 (November 1966). Soon after, Dr. Yes (a reference to Dr. No), Egg Fu's robot twin, appears in Metal Men #20 (June/July 1966).

== Fictional character biography ==
=== Pre-Crisis history ===
==== Original Egg Fu ====
Egg Fu is a Chinese Communist agent, perplexingly shaped like an egg the size of a house, with a Charlie Chan-like speech pattern, who uses his mustaches as whips. In Egg Fu's first appearance, Steve Trevor is captured by Egg Fu and turned into a human bomb. Wonder Woman intercepts the missile Trevor is on, but both are killed in the process. Hippolyta gathers the remains of Wonder Woman and Trevor and restores them in a laboratory on Paradise Island. However, Trevor's body is still infused with explosive energy. Wonder Woman finds that her own body has also become explosive, making them both a danger to the world. Egg Fu sends his troops against her, but they fail in their task to overcome her. A piece of anti-matter removes the explosive matter from Wonder Woman and Trevor, who defeat Egg Fu.

==== Egg Fu the Fifth ====
Egg Fu the Fifth appears in Wonder Woman #166 (November 1966); cover art by Ross Andru and Mike Esposito.

Wonder Woman and Steve Trevor investigate the disappearance of an American submarine. While flying over the ocean where it disappeared, Wonder Woman's plane is fired upon by an enemy freighter. Trevor boards the ship, then disappears too.

Wonder Woman's plane is drawn underwater into a giant seashell. Frogmen attack her and take her prisoner. She is brought to a secret base controlled by Egg Fu the Fifth, a relative of the original Egg Fu. Held prisoner by her own magic lasso, Wonder Woman offers to dance for Egg Fu. She then performs a bracelet-clashing dance which cracks Egg Fu and allows her to escape and rescue the stolen submarine.

==== Dr. Yes ====
Dr. Yes, Egg Fu's robot twin, uses a giant robot to capture Will Magnus, leader of the Metal Men. The team travel to Yes' base, where he brainwashes them, believing that "when the Amelicans see how these gleat heroes of theirs have turned tlaitors -- they will doubt anyone's stlength to lesist us!" [sic]

The giant robot takes the Metal Men to a football stadium that is celebrating "I am an American Day". Fighting the urge to say "Down with America!" in front of everyone, the Metal Men self-destruct instead. Yes tries having the giant robot destroy the crowd instead, but the various pieces of the Metal Men destroy the robot and free Magnus who had been trapped inside. Afterwards, Magnus rebuilds the superhero team. Yes is still at large at the story's end.

=== Post-crisis history ===
==== Post-crisis Egg Fu ====
Following the Crisis on Infinite Earths, a new version of Egg Fu is introduced in Wonder Woman (vol. 2) #128 (December 1997). This Egg Fu is an early twentieth-century super computer who was rediscovered and turned into one of many carnival attractions along Gateway City's Oceanside boardwalk, despite public protests that the attraction is racially insensitive.

Egg Fu is actually a product of Apokoliptian technology created from a device Scott Free accidentally left behind on a visit to Earth. Once activated, it begins dominating people's minds and preparing them for transport to Apokolips. Egg Fu is defeated by Hippolyta (at the time acting as Diana's successor as Wonder Woman), Donna Troy, Artemis, and Wonder Girl.

==== Chang Tzu ====
Chang Tzu from 52 #25, art by Joe Bennett.

Following the events of Infinite Crisis, a new version of Egg Fu appears: Chang Tzu, an agent of Apokolips. In 52, Chang and Bruno Mannheim kidnap many scientists and forcibly recruit them into Chang's "Science Squad" based on Oolong Island. Chang has a large, egg-shaped body with facial features and cracked skin, mounted in a spider-legged chair for mobility. He is equipped with small prosthetic hands and hidden weapons.

Shortly after Black Adam escapes confinement on Oolong Island, Chang is shot by one of his kidnapped scientists, Will Magnus. A new, smouldering egg is seen hidden in Chang's remains. When he later reappears and is asked about his seeming destruction, he explains: "My third incubation ended four months ago".

Chang Tzu later re-appears as the main villain in the 2007 storyline "Checkout", a crossover between the Outsiders and Checkmate series. Checkmate captures a team led by Nightwing and coerce them to help invade Oolong Island. A team of operatives from both groups reaches the island, but Sasha Bordeaux and Captain Boomerang are taken captive by Chang Tzu, who subjects them to torturous studies to examine their metahuman abilities. Bordeaux and Captain Boomerang's teammates free them, with Chang remaining at large.

==== Eggy ====
In The New 52, a new version of Egg Fu nicknamed "Eggy" is introduced in Harley Quinn (vol. 2) Annual #1. This version is Edgar Fullerton Yeung, a scientist who is secretly experimenting on Poison Ivy at Arkham Asylum. However, he ends up reforming with the help of Harley Quinn and gets himself a job.

== In other media ==
=== Television ===
Egg Fu makes a non-speaking appearance in the Creature Commandos episode "Chasing Squirrels" as an inmate of Belle Reve Penitentiary.

=== Video games ===
- Chang Tzu appears as a boss and NPC in DC Universe Online.
- Chang Tzu appears as a character summon in Scribblenauts Unmasked: A DC Comics Adventure.
- Chang Tzu appears as a playable character in Lego DC Super-Villains, voiced by Eric Bauza.

=== Miscellaneous ===
Egg Fu appears in Batman: The Brave and the Bold #16. This version is a demon known as Y'ggphu-Soggoth.

== See also ==
- List of Wonder Woman enemies
