= White King (comics) =

White King, in comics, may refer to:

- Marvel Comics characters, members of Hellfire Club:
  - Edward Buckman, member of the Council of the Chosen
  - Donald Pierce, member of The Lords Cardinal
  - Magneto (Marvel Comics), after the Dark Phoenix Saga
  - Benedict Kine, part of Shinobi Shaw's Inner Circle
  - Daimon Hellstrom, part of Selene's Inner Circle
- DC Comics characters, who are members of Checkmate:
  - Ahmed Samsarra, during the events around The OMAC Project
  - Alan Scott, in the post-Infinite Crisis line-up
  - Mister Terrific (Michael Holt), was the White King’s Bishop and replaced Scott when he stepped down

== See also ==
- White King (disambiguation)
- Red King (comics), the White King-equivalent rank in the London branch of the Hellfire Club
- Black King (comics)
