= Wu Mei-Xing =

Wu Mei-Xing may refer to one of two fictional characters appearing in publications by DC Comics:

- Carolyn Wu-San, the sister of Lady Shiva
- Mother of Champions, a member of the Great Ten
