= Outsiders (comics) =

Superhero team

- Cover of Convergence: Batman and the Outsiders #1 (June 2015). Depicting (top-to-bottom) Geo-Force, Halo, Batman, Katana, Black Lightning and Metamorpho; Art by Andy Kubert.

Group publication information
- Publisher: DC Comics
- First appearance: The Brave and the Bold #200 (July 1983)
- Created by: Mike W. Barr (writer); Jim Aparo (artist)

Roster
- See: List of Outsiders members

Outsiders
- : Cover for Outsiders #1 (November 1985), art by Jim Aparo

Series publication information
- Schedule: Monthly
- Format: Ongoing series
- Genre: Superhero
- Publication date: (vol. 1); November 1985 – February 1988 (vol. 2); November 1993 – November 1995 (vol. 3); August 2003 – November 2007 (vol. 4); April 2009 – June 2011
- Number of issues: (vol. 1): 28 (vol. 2): 26 (vol. 3): 50 (vol. 4): 25

Creative team
- Writer(s): (vol. 1-2); Mike Barr (vol. 3); Judd Winick (vol. 4); Peter Tomasi
- Penciller(s): (vol. 1); Jim Aparo, Steve Lightle, Joe Staton, Curt Swan, Jan Duursema, Ernie Colón, Brian Bolland, John Byrne, Jerry Ordway, Dan Jurgens, Jerome Moore, Erik Larsen (vol. 2); Paul Pelletier, Casey Jones (vol. 3); Tom Raney, Dan Jurgens, Carlos D'Anda, Karl Kerschl, Matthew Clark, Shawn Moll, Ron Randall (vol. 4); Lee Garbett, Fernando Pasarin, Don Kramer, Philip Tan, Joe Bennett, Keith Giffen
- Colorist(s): (vol. 1); Adrienne Roy
- Creator(s): Mike W. Barr (writer); Jim Aparo (artist)

Batman and the Outsiders
- Art by Kevin Nowlan

Group publication information
- Publisher: DC Comics
- First appearance: The Brave and the Bold #200 (July 1983)
- Created by: Mike Barr; Jim Aparo

Batman and the Outsiders
- : Cover for Batman and the Outsiders #1 (1983), art by Jim Aparo

Series publication information
- Schedule: Monthly
- Format: Ongoing series
- Genre: Superhero
- Publication date: (vol. 1); August 1983 – April 1986 (vol. 2); December 2007 – February 2009 (vol. 3); May 2019 – September 2020
- Number of issues: (vol. 1): 46 (with issues #33-46 called The Adventures of the Outsiders), plus 2 annuals and 1 special (vol. 2): 15, plus 1 special (vol. 3): 17, plus 1 annual

Creative team
- Writer(s): (vol. 1); Mike Barr (vol. 2); Chuck Dixon, Frank Tieri (vol. 3); Bryan Hill
- Penciller(s): (vol. 1); Jim Aparo, Alan Davis (vol. 2); Julian Lopez, Carlos Rodriguez, Ryan Benjamin (vol. 3); Dexter Soy
- Creator(s): Mike Barr; Jim Aparo

The Outsiders are a superhero team appearing in American comic books published by DC Comics. As their name suggests, the team consists of superheroes who do not fit the norms of the "mainstream" superhero community, i.e. the Justice League.

The Outsiders have had a number of different incarnations. They were founded by Batman, whose ties to the Justice League were strained at the time, and introduced the original line-up of Batman, Black Lightning, Metamorpho, Geo-Force, Katana, Halo and Looker. A later incarnation of the Outsiders from the early 2000s comics was led by Nightwing and Arsenal following the dissolution of the Teen Titans superhero group, and depicted the team as a group hunting for super-criminals. For the team's third incarnation, Batman reforms them as a special strike team featuring classic members Katana and Metamorpho alongside new recruits such as Catwoman and Black Lightning's daughter Thunder. After 2008's Batman R.I.P. storyline, Alfred Pennyworth acts on Batman's instructions to reassemble the team once more, recruiting new members and more of the team's original lineup.

Another version of the team with a familiar line-up was briefly featured in Batman Incorporated in 2011 as the black ops section of Batman's organization. Later, the Outsiders are rebooted as a secret society of weapons-themed characters in the pages of Green Arrow, featuring Katana and Onyx alongside several new characters. The original Outsiders are brought back in 2017, following DC Rebirth, as a strike team founded by Batman. 2020's incarnation of the team is led by Black Lightning, Batwing, and Batwoman, and add The Signal to the lineup.

A version of the team appears in the live-action series Black Lightning, fully formed starting in the third season and led by Black Lightning.

== Publication history ==
The Outsiders first appeared in a special insert in the final issue (#200) of The Brave and the Bold in 1983. DC's editorial team decided to replace it with a book that would feature Batman as the leader of a team. Writer Mike W. Barr volunteered for the assignment and the team was given its own comic, Batman and the Outsiders, which debuted in August 1983. The Outsiders were co-created by writer Barr and artist Jim Aparo, and later illustrated by Alan Davis.

After Batman left the group in issue #32, the title was changed to The Adventures of the Outsiders, continuing until its cancellation with issue #46. Issue #38 featured the last original story in the series, as issues #39-46 were reprints of stories from the companion series The Outsiders (1985).

The cast of the Outsiders included new characters created by Barr and Aparo (Geo-Force, Katana, Halo, and Looker). The other members were two characters who refused membership in the Justice League (Black Lightning and Metamorpho) and former Leaguer Batman.

== Fictional history ==
=== Batman and the Outsiders / The Adventures of the Outsiders (1983–1987) ===
==== Markovia and Baron Bedlam ====
The Outsiders formed in the fictional East European country of Markovia, which was ravaged by war at the time. Batman had attempted to enlist the Justice League's aid, but was told they had been ordered to stay out of the conflict. Disagreeing with the order, Batman travels to Markovia with Black Lightning to free captive Lucius Fox from Baron Bedlam, who had killed Markovia's ruler King Viktor. One of the king's sons, Brion, becomes Geo-Force after gaining powers from Helga Jace to stop Bedlam. Separately, Metamorpho and Katana arrive in Markovia for their own means. Batman finds a young, amnesiac girl in the woods exhibiting light-based powers, whom he names Halo. These heroes banded together to defeat Baron Bedlam and decided to stay together as a team.

==== The Masters of Disaster and the Force of July ====
Recurring foes include the Masters of Disaster, who at one point almost killed Black Lightning. Windfall eventually becomes disenchanted with her team and joins the Outsiders. Another recurring opponent was the Force of July, a group of patriotic metahumans who also regularly came into contact with the Suicide Squad. Batman reveals his real identity as Bruce Wayne to the team (although they already knew it). Eventually, Halo's origins were revealed. Emily Briggs (who later became the superheroine Looker and joined the team) was introduced.

==== Without Batman ====
Baron Bedlam later returned to life. With the assistance of the Bad Samaritan, the Masters of Disaster, and Soviet forces, he tries to seize control of Markovia. Batman withholds information from the Outsiders, angering the rest of the team. This eventually leads to Batman disbanding the team and returning to the Justice League. Nevertheless, the team travels to Markovia, discovering many Markovian military casualties. They are defeated by the Masters and learn that Bedlam cloned Adolf Hitler; however, the Hitler clone commits suicide in horror of the atrocities perpetrated by the original. The Outsiders become unofficial agents of Markovia, receiving funding from Markovia.

=== Outsiders (1985–1988) ===
This series again featured the original group, and was printed in the Baxter paper format used on such titles as The New Teen Titans (vol. 2) and the Legion of Super-Heroes (vol. 3). It lasted for 28 issues, in addition to Annuals and special issues. The series originally ran alongside the title The Adventures of the Outsiders, chronicling events a year after that series. In the end, the first few issues of this series were reprinted in The Adventures of the Outsiders before that title was cancelled.

==== Story ====
The team moves into a new headquarters in Los Angeles and once again becomes involved in an adventure with the Force of July (ending in Moscow). Villains such as the Duke of Oil and the Soviet super-team the People's Heroes are introduced during this time. The team's adventures take them all over the globe, most notably when the Outsiders' plane is shot down and the team is marooned on a deserted island for three weeks. Tensions rise as Geo-Force tries to resign his leadership and he and Looker succumb to temptation. Eventually, the team is rescued.

==== Reuniting with Batman ====
The Outsiders are reunited with Batman when they band together to fight Eclipso. After the adventure, Batman gives them access to a batcave in Los Angeles. The team is also infiltrated by a clone of Windfall. Meanwhile, Looker and Geo-Force feel guilty about their affair and eventually end it. Metamorpho faces his own personal problems with his wife Sapphire Stagg. The clone of Windfall is ultimately killed; the Masters of Disaster are defeated, as the real Windfall joins the Outsiders.

=== Millennium ===
The team is next involved with the crossover event Millennium, wherein it is revealed that Helga Jace is an operative of the Manhunters and kidnaps the team. The team (now joined by the Atomic Knight) free themselves, but Jace attacks Metamorpho, causing an energy surge that kills them both. Looker is called to return to Abyssia (the origin of her powers), where she must also face the Manhunters. During the adventure, she is drained of much of her power and returns to her normal form. Halo is hit in the crossfire when saving Katana's life and is rendered comatose. The team is disbanded by Geo-Force as Looker returns to her husband, and Batman rejoins the Justice League.

=== Outsiders (vol. 2) (1993–1995) ===
This revival of the title in 1993 lasted 25 issues and was written by Mike W. Barr, with most issues penciled by Paul Pelletier.

==== Story ====
Declared a traitor in Markovia, Geo-Force is forced to seek the help of the Outsiders to battle the vampire-lord who controls his country. This is later coupled with the framing of the Outsiders for the slaughter of a Markovian village, forcing them into hiding. This fugitive status motivates the Atomic Knight to go after them, hoping to bring in his former allies without too much trouble. He is eventually convinced of their innocence and joins them.

The new members who join the team in Markovia are the magician Sebastian Faust, the warsuit-wearing engineer and industrialist the Technocrat, and Wylde, a friend of Technocrat who Faust transforms into a humanoid bear to save his life.

During the initial confrontation with the vampires, Looker is apparently killed. Hiding out in Gotham City, the Outsiders experience another loss as Technocrat's wife Marissa and Halo are killed during a fight with Jean-Paul Valley. However, Halo's spirit survives in Marissa's body. For some time afterward, Technocrat has trouble accepting that his wife is dead. Eventually it is discovered that Looker is not dead, but undead. The Outsiders find her and free her from the vampire's control.

==== Split in two ====
After the defeat of the vampires, two teams (one composed of Geo-Force, Katana, and Technocrat; the other composed of Eradicator, Looker, Wylde, Halo, and Sebastian Faust) claim the name of the Outsiders; both teams are considered fugitives due to questionable tactics by their new members. During this time, the teams learn that Halo's original body was resurrected by Kobra and joined their ranks. Both Kobra and Violet Harper are defeated, and Windfall rejoins the Outsiders.

The two teams unite to confront Felix Faust, the father of Outsiders member Sebastian Faust. During the confrontation, Wylde betrays the team when Felix promises to restore his humanity. The team defeats Felix and Wylde, who is transformed into a normal bear and kept in a zoo where Looker can regularly visit him. The title ends with the clearing of the Outsiders' names and the marriage of Geo-Force and Denise Howard.

In the interim, the Halo entity is restored to Violet Harper's body, returning her to normal off-panel and a new team of Outsiders is formed and seen as active in the Day of Judgment crossover event. Members of this new team include Geo-Force, Halo, Katana, and Terra.

=== Outsiders (vol. 3) (2003–2007) ===
Outsiders (vol. 3) is largely unrelated to the previous series. It was launched in 2003 with new members, some of whom had been part of the Titans. The series was cancelled with issue #50 and relaunched as Batman and the Outsiders (vol. 2), featuring a mix of current and new members.

==== Formation ====
The new team is put together following the Titans/Young Justice: Graduation Day crossover, which dissolves both groups. Arsenal accepts a sponsorship offer from the Optitron Corporation and uses the money to buy an enormous bomb shelter which had belonged to a multimillionaire, renovating it as group headquarters. He recruits a group of young heroes, the last of whom is his friend Nightwing. Nightwing decides that, instead of functioning in a reactive capacity like most other superhero teams, this group should act as hunters, tracking down supervillains before they can cause problems.

=== One Year Later ===
After the events of Infinite Crisis, the Outsiders are "officially" no more. Because of the Freedom of Power Treaty, the Outsiders have been operating covertly outside of the United States. Most of the members were presumed dead until a botched mission forced them to reveal their presence. Following the revelation of their existence, they are recruited by Checkmate to pursue missions which Checkmate cannot support publicly. Checkmate's assignment as part of the "CheckOut" crossover story arc involves dispatching the Outsiders to Oolong Island in China, the scene of World War III the previous year. The mission goes wrong when Chang Tzu captures Owen Mercer and Sasha Bordeaux, until both sides are bailed out by Batman. In the aftermath, Nightwing decides to give Batman control of the team once more.

=== Batman and the Outsiders (vol. 2) / Outsiders (vol. 4) (2007–2011) ===
In November 2007, writer Chuck Dixon and artist Julian Lopez relaunched Outsiders (vol. 3) as Batman and the Outsiders (vol. 2), with the Dark Knight taking control of the team in the aftermath of the "CheckOut" crossover with Checkmate.

==== Outsiders: Five of a Kind ====
In the weeks leading up to the new series' debut, Batman holds tryouts to determine who will be on the team in a series of one-shots called Five of a Kind. Each issue featured a different creative team (including Outsiders creator Mike W. Barr) and an epilogue written by Tony Bedard.

Batman angers several members, who feel he has no right to remove people already on the team. Captain Boomerang leaves the team for Amanda Waller's Suicide Squad, and Nightwing decides to take no part in the Outsiders' questionable activities. Katana is chosen as the team's first official member, joined later by Martian Manhunter, Metamorpho and Grace. Thunder is kicked off the team; the second Aquaman is rejected because Batman feels he does not match up to his predecessor, Orin. Batman then tells the other members: "Whether you like it or not, you're here to save the world. And you're going to be hated for it". After the team's first official mission in Outsiders #50, Catwoman overheard the other recruits talking about the team being "down by law" and said: "Batman can't possibly start up his own crew of super-crooks without me in it!"

==== Batman and the Outsiders (vol. 2) ====
The team from Outsiders #50 was featured in the first two issues of Batman and the Outsiders (vol. 2). Afterward, Catwoman and Martian Manhunter left the team and Batgirl, Geo-Force and Green Arrow joined; Thunder consistently appeared in the series as well. In issue #5, Elongated Man and Sue Dibny make a guest appearance. They are now "ghost detectives", and seem able to possess people in a method similar to that of Deadman. Francine Langstrom serves as the team's technical advisor, and her assistant Salah Miandad operates the "blank" OMAC drone ReMAC. In issue #9, Batman calls on former team member Looker to assist in an interrogation.

The first main storyline of the title involves Batman sending the team to investigate the mysterious Mr. Jardine, who is plotting to populate a subterranean lake on the Moon with alien lifeforms. While trying to stop Jardine's unauthorized space-shot in South America, Metamorpho is blasted into space and is forced to escape from the International Space Station, where seemingly-brainwashed astronauts are building a giant weapon. Seeking a shuttle to hijack, the rest of the team infiltrates a Chinese space facility, only to be captured by members of the Great Ten. The timely intervention of Batgirl and ReMAC saves the team from execution. Metamorpho steals a shuttle back to Earth, escapes from the European Space Agency and rejoins the team.

During the storyline Batman R.I.P., an assembly of the Outsiders (including Thunder) receives a message from the missing Batman. It asks them to feed a secret code into the cybernetic mind of ReMAC, allowing it to track the Caped Crusader and the Black Glove organization and help him in his fight. As they comply (against Batgirl's advice), the code reveals itself as a cybernetic booby-trap coming from Simon Hurt (the mastermind behind Batman's downfall) and ReMAC explodes. Several Outsiders are wounded, and Thunder is left comatose.

==== Outsiders (vol. 4) ====
As a result of Batman R.I.P. and Final Crisis (where Batman apparently died), the series was renamed Outsiders (vol. 4) and featured a new team roster. The change occurred when a new creative team took over, with Peter Tomasi writing and Lee Garbett on art duty. Tomasi began with Batman and the Outsiders Special (vol. 2) #1 and the retitled series began with issue #15.

One night, Alfred Pennyworth awakens in Wayne Manor to a giant door opening in his room. He walks through it, where he sees a pod with a chair inside. He takes a seat, as a hologram of Batman activates. Batman explains that, because he has not entered a special code into the Bat-Computer for a certain length of time, this recording is playing (meaning he is probably dead). He tells Alfred of an important mission the latter must undertake on his behalf (since Batman is unable to do so), but gives him a choice to accept or decline. Alfred promptly accepts; Batman explains what Alfred has meant to him throughout his life, saying to him what he did not have a chance to say at his death: "Goodbye, Dad."

With this, Batman charges Alfred to assemble a new team of Outsiders. Alfred travels around the planet, recruiting Roy Raymond, Black Lightning, Geo-Force, Halo, Katana, Creeper, and Metamorpho. As a member of the team, each must become a true "outsider," living away from their families and the public eye for months at a time. Each member fills a role once filled by Batman, making this team a composite. This story arc ended with issue #25, and the series ended after 40 issues.

=== Post–Final Crisis ===
Dan DiDio and Phillip Tan began a new run of Outsiders in January 2010, in which Geo-Force appears to be acting more irrationally since his battle with Deathstroke. Without consulting the rest of the team (or Alfred), Geo-Force enters into a non-aggression pact with New Krypton, offering Markovia as a haven for the Kryptonians. The Eradicator is New Krypton's representative.

=== The New 52 ===
In 2011, "The New 52" rebooted the DC universe.

==== Batman Inc. (2011–2013) ====
In he pages of the 2011 Batman Inc. series by Grant Morrison, Batman assembles a new team of Outsiders which acts as a black-ops wing of Batman Incorporated. The team consists of Metamorpho, Katana, Looker, Halo, and Freight Train, and is led by Red Robin. This incarnation of the team proved short-lived, as all of its members (except Red Robin) were caught in an explosion caused by Lord Death Man. The survivors were revealed in issue #1 of (vol. two) (2012). Metamorpho had kept everyone alive via his powers.

==== In Green Arrow (vol. 5) (2013–2016) ====
Beginning with Jeff Lemire's run of Green Arrow (vol. 5), a new version of the 'Outsiders' was introduced. This is explained as being an ancient secret society dedicated to the elimination of corruption, but which itself has grown corrupt. Its membership is formed from the leaders of various clans centred around totemic weapons: the Mask, the Fist, the Arrow, the Axe, the Spear, the Shield, the Sword. A literal Green Arrow was the totemic weapon of the 'Arrow Clan', but this was destroyed by the Green Arrow as part of his symbolic rejection of the group. The Soultaker sword owned by Katana is the Sword Totem, making her the leader of the Sword Clan. The weapon totems supposedly grant immortality and enlightenment on the wielder, but the Green Arrow doubts such claims.

=== DC Rebirth ===
The original Outsiders are reintroduced in Dark Days: The Forge #1 (2017), a prelude to DC's Dark Nights: Metal crossover, in an expository scene which explains that Batman formed the Outsiders (Black Lightning, Metamorpho, Geo-Force, Katana, and Halo) to investigate a mystery concerning the DC Universe which connects the strangeness of the Multiverse to the properties of metals—like Nth Metal, the Court of Owls' resurrection metal, Aquaman's trident, and Doctor Fate's helmet— to metahumans and to mystical lands like Nanda Parbat, Skartaris, Atlantis, and Themiscyra. He assembled the team to operate outside the knowledge of the government, the Justice League, or the Batman family.

In Doomsday Clock, Geo-Force forms a new version of the Outsiders consisting of Baroness Bedlam, Eradicator, Knightfall, Terra, and Wylde.

The Detective Comics story arc On the Outside (July 2018) had Batman and Black Lightning come together to defeat the villain Karma. In the aftermath of the battle, Batman told Black Lightning that he wanted him to lead a new team of Outsiders consisting of himself, Cassandra Cain, Duke Thomas, and Katana, who had fought as their allies in the fight against Karma. An ongoing comic book featuring this team, titled Batman and the Outsiders (vol. 3), was set to release in December 2018. The series was abruptly cancelled before finally releasing in May the following year.

Black Lightning assembles a new "modular" iteration of the team with himself, Duke, Katana, and Metamorpho, and a rotating fifth member. In Batman: Urban Legends, Batman joins the team to help Duke find his mother.

== Enemies ==
The following are enemies of the Outsiders:

- Bad Samaritan: A master technician.
- Baron Bedlam: A Markovian baron.
- Cryonic Man: A scientist who frozen himself, armed with ice technology.
- Doctor Moon: A mad scientist.
- Duke of Oil: A cyborg who can control nuclear devices.
- Force of July: A group of patriotic metahumans established by the A.S.A.
  - Major Victory: William Vickers is the team leader. He has enhanced strength, flight, and energy blasts derived from a power suit. He is later killed by Eclipso.
  - Abraham Carlyle: A government liaison.
  - B. Eric Blairman: A government liaison who wielded Psycho-Pirate's Medusa Mask.
  - Lady Liberty: A member of the Force of July who wields an energy-projecting torch. She is killed in an explosion aboard Kobra's satellite in Janus Directive.
  - Mayflower: A member of the Force of July who can manipulate plants. She is later killed by Ravan.
  - Silent Majority: A member of the Force of July who can duplicate himself. He is killed in a battle aboard Kobra's satellite.
  - Sparkler: A member of the Force of July who can project light as beams and fireworks. He is later killed by Doctor Light.
- Hammer and Sickle: Two Russian villains.
- Ishmael: A former experiment of the Ark Project who joins the League of Assassins.
- Kobra: The leader of a self-titled cult.
- Masters of Disaster: A group of elemental metahumans.
- New Olympians: A group of mercenaries who serve Maxie Zeus and are themed after Greek and Roman deities.
  - Antaeus: A member of the New Olympians. He has powers similar to his namesake, drawing strength from the ground.
  - Argus: A member of the New Olympians. He can telepathically see events unfold from great distances.
  - Diana: A member of the New Olympians. She is a skilled archer and swordswoman who commands a group of dogs.
  - Nox: A member of the New Olympians who can manipulate shadows.
  - Proteus: A shapeshifting member of the New Olympians.
  - Vulcanus: A member of the New Olympians. He wields a hammer and can generate fire.
- Nuclear Family: A group of nuclear-powered androids modeled after their creator, Eric Shanner, and his family.
- Strike Force Kobra: A group of villains whose powers are similar to some of Batman's enemies. They were created by Kobra.
- Syonide: A female assassin.
- Tobias Whale: An albino crime lord.
- Velocity: A clone of the Flash created by the Brotherhood of Evil.

== Collected editions ==
=== Batman and the Outsiders (vol. 1) ===
Title	Material collected	Publication date	ISBN
Showcase Presents: Batman and the Outsiders Vol. 1	Batman and the Outsiders (vol. 1) #1–19, The Brave and the Bold #200, New Teen Titans #37	September 2007	978-1401215460
Batman and the Outsiders Vol. 1	Batman and the Outsiders (vol. 1) #1–13, The Brave and the Bold #200, New Teen Titans #37	February 2017	978-1401268121
Batman and the Outsiders Vol. 2	Batman and the Outsiders (vol. 1) #14–23, Annual #1	February 2018	978-1401277536
Batman and the Outsiders Vol. 3	Batman and the Outsiders (vol. 1) #24–32, Annual #2, DC Comics Presents #83 and material from Who's Who #12-15	April 2019	978-1401287641

=== Outsiders (vol. 3) ===
Title	Material collected	Publication date	ISBN
Looking for Trouble	Outsiders (vol. 3) #1–7	February 2004	978-1401202118
Sum of all Evil	Outsiders (vol. 3) #8–15	December 2004	978-1401202439
Wanted	Outsiders (vol. 3) #16–23	November 2005	978-1401204600
Teen Titans/Outsiders: The Insiders	Outsiders (vol. 3) #24–25, 28, Teen Titans #24–26	January 2006	978-1401209261
Crisis Intervention	Outsiders (vol. 3) #29–33	April 2006	978-1401209735
The Good Fight	Outsiders (vol. 3) #34–41	January 2007	978-1401211950
Pay As You Go	Outsiders (vol. 3) #42–46, Annual #1	July 2007	978-1401213664
Outsiders/Checkmate: CheckOut	Outsiders (vol. 3) #47–49, Checkmate #13-15	January 2008	978-1401216238
Five of a Kind	Outsiders (vol. 3) #50, Outsiders: Five of a Kind #1–5	March 2008	978-1401216726
The Outsiders by Judd Winick Book One	Outsiders (vol. 3) #1-7, Titans/Young Justice: Graduation Day #1-3, Teen Titans/Outsiders Secret Files #1	May 2019	978-1401288518

=== Batman and the Outsiders (vol. 2) / Outsiders (vol. 4) ===
Title	Material collected	Publication date	ISBN
The Chrysalis	Batman and the Outsiders (vol. 2) #1–5	October 2008	978-1401219314
The Snare	Batman and the Outsiders (vol. 2) #6–10	February 2009	978-1401221997
The Deep	Batman and the Outsiders Special (vol. 2) #1, Outsiders (vol. 4) #15–20	November 2009	978-1401225025
The Hunt	Outsiders (vol. 4) #21–25	May 2010	978-1401227166
The Road to Hell	Outsiders (vol. 4) #26–31	November 2010	978-1401229030
The Great Divide	Outsiders (vol. 4) #32–39, Batman and the Outsiders (vol. 2) #40	August 2011	978-1401231613

=== Batman and the Outsiders (vol. 3) ===
Title	Material collected	Publication date	ISBN
Batman and the Outsiders Vol. 1: Lesser Gods	Batman and the Outsiders (vol. 3) #1-7	December 2019	978-1401291785
Batman and the Outsiders Vol. 2: A League of Their Own	Batman and the Outsiders (vol. 3) #8-12, Annual #1	August 2020	978-1779502865
Batman and the Outsiders Vol. 3: The Demon's Fire	Batman and the Outsiders (vol. 3) #13-17	March 2021	978-1779506962

=== Outsiders (vol. 5) ===
Title	Material collected	Publication date	ISBN
Outsiders Vol. 1: Planet of the Bat	Outsiders (vol. 5) #1-6	November 2024	978-1779528391
Outsiders Vol. 2: Never the End	Outsiders (vol. 5) #7-11	May 2025	978-1799501244

== In other media ==
=== Television ===
The Outsiders as they appear in Batman: The Brave and the Bold. From left to right: Katana, Halo, Black Lightning, Metamorpho, and Geo-Force.

- The Outsiders appear in Batman: The Brave and the Bold, initially consisting of teenage versions of Black Lightning, Katana, and Metamorpho. The three initially serve the crime lord Slug before Batman and Wildcat convince them to reform. Geo-Force and Halo later join the Outsiders in the episode "Requiem for a Scarlet Speedster!".
- The Outsiders appear in the Beware the Batman finale "Alone", initially consisting of Batman, Katana, Metamorpho, Alfred, Oracle and Man-Bat.
- The Outsiders appear in Young Justice: Outsiders, consisting of Beast Boy, Geo-Force, Wonder Girl, Blue Beetle, Kid Flash, Static, El Dorado, Cyborg, Terra, Superboy, Forager, Robin, Windfall, Stargirl, Looker, and Livewire.
- An Outsiders comic appears in the Black Lightning episode "LaWanda: The Book of Burial".

=== Miscellaneous ===
The Outsiders appear in Smallville Season 11, consisting of Green Arrow, Metamorpho, Grace Choi, Geo-Force, Black Lightning, Katana, and Roy Harper. This version of the group was assembled by the Department of Extranormal Operations.
