= Los Angeles Soap Co. =

American soap company

Los Angeles Soap Company was founded by John A. Forthmann. Charles Brode was a director of the Los Angeles Soap Company.

== History ==
In 1860, John A. Forthmann, a German-born 17-year-old, arrived at the pueblo of Los Angeles, later buying a small soap business in a shack at 2nd and Spring streets. By 1874, the soap plant had moved to a wooden building near the Los Angeles & San Pedro Railroad, from which Forthmann shipped soap around the West. Its oldest building dated back to 1858. The Los Angeles Soap Company Plant, at 617 E. 1st Street, spread over 40 acres (16 hectares) and with around 600 employees, produced more than 75 brands of soap.

In 1897, the company, headed by John A. Forthmann and William D. Bergin, filed incorporation papers. After World War I, White King D, the nation's first granulated laundry detergent, began production.

In 1922, the White King Soapsters joined the Greater Southern California Baseball Association.

The Los Angeles Soap Company sponsored Chandu the Magician, a radio series, and Queen for a Day, which began on radio in 1945, moved to television in 1956, and remained there until 1964.

In 1967, a factory it opened on the East Coast of the US closed within a year. On June 17, 1988, the Los Angeles plant was closed, about 128 years after the company began.

== Products ==
Los Angeles Soap did private-label packing for Vons, Ralphs, Luckys and Thrifty Drug, contract packing for companies such as Shaklee and Avon, and manufactured tiny bars of soap favored by hotels.

- Mission Bell, soap
- White King Soap, soap
- White King Soap, laundry soap
- White King D, laundry detergent
- White King Water Softener
- Cocoa Naptha

== See also ==
- Charles Brode
- Forthmann Carriage House
- Timeline of Los Angeles
- West Adams, Los Angeles
- Chandu the Magician, an American radio series
