= Janus Directive =

1989 DC Comics storyline

"The Janus Directive"
- Cover of Checkmate #15 (May 1989), art by Gil Kane
- Publisher: DC Comics
- Publication date: May – June 1989
- Genre: Spy, superhero; Crossover
Title(s)
Captain Atom #30
Checkmate #15-18
Firestorm the Nuclear Man #86-87
Manhunter #14
Suicide Squad #27-30

"The Janus Directive" is an eleven-part comic book crossover first published by DC Comics between May and June of 1989. Among the creators who contributed to the storyline were writers John Ostrander, Kim Yale, Paul Kupperberg, Cary Bates and Greg Weisman, and artists John K. Snyder III, Rick Hoberg, Rafael Kayanan, Tom Mandrake, and Pat Broderick.

== History ==
The crossover storyline ran through the following titles: Checkmate! (#15-18), Suicide Squad (#27-30), Manhunter (#14), Firestorm (vol. 2) (#86), and Captain Atom (#30). Checkmate! and Suicide Squad were published biweekly for the duration of the event.

The storyline focused on the covert operations super-teams and organizations that existed in the DC Universe at the time.

== Plot ==
Suicide Squad leader Amanda Waller begins sending her agents on missions in the apparent pursuit of her own private agenda, the so-called "Janus Directive", bringing the Squad into conflict with other metahuman villains and government agencies. All-out mayhem breaks loose among these groups, involving various metahumans associated with the United States military and civilian agencies.

It is revealed that Waller has not gone rogue - cult leader Kobra tried to murder Waller and replace her with a subservient doppelgänger to manipulate and mislead the various government agencies to keep them from stopping his own plan. Kobra plans to activate a massive space-based microwave pulse cannon that would fry all electronic systems (not to mention human nervous systems) in the eastern United States, unleashing the Kali Yuga, the age of chaos he believes it is his destiny to commence. Waller has murdered her double and is playing the role of traitor in order to ferret out the true mastermind behind the Janus Directive. Eventually, the truth is revealed, the groups unite and storm Kobra's space ark, capturing him and destroying his weapon.

The fallout of the Janus Directive results in an irate George H. W. Bush reorganizing the various agencies to bring them under executive control; he dissolves Task Force X, the umbrella organization under which both Checkmate and the Squad operated (the component agencies becoming autonomous), and makes Sarge Steel a Cabinet-level official with overall control of all governmental metahuman activity on the civilian side. General Wade Eiling is made his equivalent in the Department of Defense. Waller is put on probation by Bush because of her "lone wolf" tactics, much to her displeasure.

Waller is soon imprisoned for taking matters into her own hands after leading an assassination team to personally liquidate the Vodou-oriented drug ring called the Loa. This leads to the shutdown of all Suicide Squad operations for one year.

== Major players ==
Project Atom	C.B.I.	Checkmate	Force of July	Project Peacemaker	Suicide Squad
Major Wade Eiling	Sarge Steel	Harry Stein	Major Victory	Peacemaker	Amanda Waller
Professor Heinrich Megala	King Faraday	Harvey Bullock	Lady Liberty		Bronze Tiger
Captain Atom	John Chase	Valentina Vostok	Mayflower		Vixen
Major Force	Cherie Chase	Gary Washington	Silent Majority		Ravan
		Black Thorn	Sparkler		Captain Boomerang
		Checkmate Knights	Abraham Lincoln Carlyle		Duchess
					Shade, the Changing Man
					Count Vertigo

== Tie-in issues ==
- Part 1: Checkmate! #15 (May 1989)
- Part 2: Suicide Squad #27 (May 1989)
- Part 3: Checkmate! #16 (May 1989)
- Part 4: Suicide Squad #28 (May 1989)
- Part 5: Checkmate! #17 (June 1989)
- Part 6: Manhunter #14 (June 1989)
- Part 7: Firestorm the Nuclear Man (vol. 2) #86 (June 1989)
- Part 8: Suicide Squad #29 (June 1989)
- Part 9: Checkmate! #18 (June 1989)
- Part 10: Suicide Squad #30 (June 1989)
- Part 11: Captain Atom #30 (June 1989)
- Firestorm the Nuclear Man (vol. 2) #87

Although not bannered as a part of the crossover, parts of Firestorm the Nuclear Man (vol. 2) #87 were an epilogue to the storyline.

== See also ==
- List of government agencies in DC Comics
