= Black King (comics) =

Black King, in comics, may refer to:

- Marvel Comics characters, members of the Hellfire Club, in various branches at various times. The title also gives its owner complete ownership of the club.
  - Sebastian Shaw (character), as originally introduced in X-Men comics
  - Blackheart, part of Selene's reformed group
  - Sunspot (character), replaced Sebastian Shaw when he became Lord Imperial
- DC Comics characters, who are members of Checkmate:
  - Amanda Waller, former organizer of Suicide Squad
  - Maxwell Lord, former organizer of the Justice League

== See also ==
- Black King (disambiguation)
- White King (comics)
- Black Queen (comics)
