= The prophecy of the White King =

The prophecy of the White King is an English political-astrological prophecy dating from medieval times. In its earlier form it may have referred to Stephen, King of England (c. 1092–1154). It was revived in 1644 by William Lilly in his booklet A Prophecy of the White King; and Dreadfull Dead-man Explaned.
