= List of Maoyu episodes =

Maoyū Maō Yūsha, also known as Maoyu, is a 2013 fantasy anime based on the light novels by Mamare Touno and illustrated by Keinojou Mizutama and toi8. Set in a medieval fantasy world, a war known as the Southern Kingdoms War has been raging between the humans and demons for 15 years. The humankind's greatest warrior, known as the Hero, confronts and plans to finish the leader of the Demons, the Demon King, hoping it will end the war. To his surprise, the "Demon King" is actually a Queen and she explains the war between their people is not a war between good and evil and ending it now will only bring further chaos. Convinced, both of them work together to end the war another way that will benefit both sides from behind the scenes.

The anime aired from January 5 to March 30, 2013, on Tokyo MX. The anime is produced by Arms and directed by Takeo Takahashi, written by Naruhisa Arakawa and music is by Takeshi Hama. The anime was streamed on Crunchyroll with English subtitles. The opening theme song is "Mukaikaze" (向かい風; "Headwind") by Yohko and the ending theme song is "Unknown Vision" by Akino Arai.

== Episodes ==
No.	Title	Original air date
1	"– You will be mine, Hero. – I refuse!" Transliteration: "Kono Ware no Mono to Nare, Yūsha yo. Kotowaru!" (Japanese: この我のものとなれ、勇者よ 断る!)	January 5, 2013
For 15 years, a war has raged between the humans and demons. The humans' greatest warrior, Hero, heads to the castle of the Demon King, leader of the demons, to end the war. To his surprise, the "Demon King" is actually a queen and she has been waiting to meet Hero in person and wishes to talk with him instead. As they talk, she reveals the war has actually benefited both sides as their races have put aside their differences to fight against a common enemy and improved the economy. However, it has allowed the powerful and corrupt to abuse the weak; particularly how the poorer human Southern kingdoms must continue fighting the demons, in exchange for food and financial aid from the rich Central kingdoms. Furthermore, no matter which side wins or if the war suddenly ends without compensating those employed because of the war, it will lead to a massive civil war much to Hero's horror. But the Queen has a plan to bring prosperity and a lasting peace for both their races and wants his help. Convinced, Hero agrees where both of them pledge their lives to each other.
2	"Please Make Us Human"; Transliteration: "Watashitachi o Ningen ni Shitekudasai" (Japanese: わたしたちをニンゲンにしてください)	January 12, 2013
After teleporting to the Human Realm, the Queen and Hero arrive at a small farming village called Winter Pass, settling at a villa with the help of her most trusted servant, Head Maid. To stall time for the war, rumors are spread that the Hero and Demon King fought and are recuperating their wounds. Thanks to Head Maid, the Queen is given a cover identity as a human noblewoman known as Crimson Scholar. The Crimson Scholar plans to convince the village elder to adopt a four-field crop rotation system to increase production but is unable to convince him. Later that night, they hear a commotion at the stables just to find two young sisters hiding in there, fleeing from a life of serfdom. Hero wishes to help them but Head Maid refuses as she scorns them at first as they are no different than insects who can't control their own lives. The sisters ask Head Maid to teach them to act like humans so they can learn, which she accepts and takes them under her care as she needs help at the villa. As the sisters are given an education by the Scholar, she also teaches the sons of a Noble, a Warrior and a Merchant about the war's effects on society, hoping to change their views on it. Thanks to her classes, the Scholar is able to get another meeting with village elder, whom she plans to win over with a secret weapon.
3	"Where Have You Been?!"; Transliteration: "Ima Made Doko Hottsuki Aruite Ita no yo!" (Japanese: いままでどこほっつき歩いていたのよ!)	January 19, 2013
Some months later, the village has adopted the Scholar's farming methods. Crimson Scholar and Hero, now assuming the identity of the White Swordsman have a meeting with the nun in charge of the Lake convent in Lake Nation, whom they discover to be actually Female Knight, a member of Hero's old party. To justify Hero's disappearance, Crimson Scholar claims to Female Knight that she found him severely wounded from his fight with the Demon King and upon saving his life, he offered his protection in gratitude. They learn from her that one of Hero's companions, Archer, went to serve one of the royal families of the Southern Kingdoms while Female Magician, left for the Demon Realm looking for him. Scholar reveals her secret weapon to Female Knight, potatoes, a crop then unknown in the Human Realm, and its benefits and ask her and the Church to spread the crop and teach people of the Southern countries to farm it which Female Knight agrees. Meanwhile the Merchant Alliance guild receives a present from the Scholar, a dry compass, and upon discussing its benefits, they decide to look for a way to monopolize the compass. Back at the villa, Hero decides to search for Female Magician in the Demon Realm and before he departs, the Queen presents him with an imposing black armor and instructs him to use it while acting there as an enforcer under her command and meets some Demon leaders he can trust.
4	"If That Happens, I'll Take a Bite Out of the Hero!"; Transliteration: "Sonna Koto ni Nattara Yūsha ni Kamitsuiteyaru!" (Japanese: そんなことになったら勇者に噛みついてやる!)	January 26, 2013
The Fall season has arrived since Hero's departure and Female Knight has moved to the villa to teach swordsmanship to Crimson Scholar's students. A member of the Alliance, Young Merchant, pays a visit to Scholar and she introduces to him another crop, corn, which will help boost mankind's food production even further if the Alliance helps her fund the farming the crop. Despite learning Scholar's goal is to see the war end peacefully, which might be seen as treacherous and heresy to the Human kingdoms and the Church, Young Merchant accepts her proposition. Before leaving, he proposes to Crimson Scholar much to her embarrassment. In the Winter Kingdom, Winter Prince boasts about Scholar with his Butler, who is actually Archer, on how her crops and ideas have helped the South which will lead to economic independence from Central. While it has been six months since Hero left to the Demon Realm and has gained some demon allies, the Queen's anxiety increases, unaware that he has made use of his teleportation skill to return regularly to the villa behind her back, a fact only known by Chief Maid, to whom he confesses that he refrains to meet her out of his drive to become useful to her. Meanwhile, the southern nations are ordered by Central to assemble a huge naval fleet to recapture Aurora Island, the only territory in the human world under control of the Demons.
5	"– You smell good, Demon King. – And I feel safe in your arms, Hero."; Transliteration: "Maou tte ii Nioida na. Yūsha no Ude no Naka wa Hotto Suru." (Japanese: 魔王っていい匂いだな 勇者の腕の中はほっとする)	February 2, 2013
At Gateway City, a huge city in the Demon Realm occupied by the Humans, Hero, addressing himself as Black Knight, saves a Demon barmaid from being harassed from Crusaders and learns from her how most of the Human army have mistreated the Demons since occupying the city except those who guard the Eastern Fortress. Meanwhile, the expeditionary fleet sent to recapture Aurora Island is a disaster no thanks to their incompetent commander the White Night King when Demon Krakens destroy most of the fleet with only a few survivors, including the Winter Prince, whose father is killed saving the White Night King. Back in the Southern Nations, most of the Southern leaders are disgusted with White Night King, who refuses to take responsibility for his failures and tries to blame it on the late Winter King. Viewed with distrust by White Night King due to Crimson Scholar, the Church and the Alliance helping the Winter Kingdom, the Winter Prince assumes his father's throne, becoming the new Winter King and summons Female Knight to command a second expedition to recapture Aurora Island. As Female Knight prepares to depart, Scholar confesses her true identity as the Demon King to her and wants to be her friend. To her surprise, Female Knight already knew since Hero told her the truth before and accepts her friendship. The New Year Festival arrives and after one year apart, Hero and Queen finally reunite. After the two have a dance by themselves, Hero reveals to her that he has a plan to liberate Gateway City in one month and learns from her that she also intends to help the Humans retake Aurora Island. Hero then leaves again, promising to meet her next time in the battlefield.
6	"– Welcome back, Hero! – Yeah, Old Man. I'm Back!"; Transliteration: "Okaerinasai, Yūsha! Aa, Jiisan. Tadaima da!" (Japanese: お帰りなさい、勇者! ああ、爺さん.........ただいまだ!)	February 9, 2013
Elder Sister Maid asks Crimson Scholar why war exists and the latter explains its causes. Meanwhile, with the help of fairies, the Black Knight causes nightmarish illusions to the Crusader armies in Gateway City, affecting their sanity and morale, including that of the Crusader Commander. The Crimson Scholar arrives at the Winter King's camp and offers her aid to him and Female Knight. To counter the Arctic General and his demons's advantage they have at the open sea, the Winter Kingdom forces build a land bridge using floating icebergs with the salt Scholar brought to hold them together. Now fighting them on even ground, Female Knight leads the Winter Kingdom armies and claims the beachhead at Aurora Island. Despite their success, they must now prepare a long siege at the Arctic General's fortress. But the Winter armies get unexpected help when Hero teleports to their camp and the Crusader armies arrive from Gateway City. It is revealed that the Crusaders abandoned the city and its civilians to the mercenary General of the Eastern Fortress. Now in command, the General forms a new government with the city's influential demons to maintain peace between their races. The demons launch one last offensive only to be defeated when Female Knight slays the Arctic General. As the Winter kingdom celebrates their recapture of Aurora island, the Winter King rewards Crimson Scholar and Female Knights with titles. Archer reunites with Hero and tells him not to isolate himself due to his powers as he still has friends who care about him.
7	"I'll be back soon. We'll see each other soon." Transliteration: "Sugu ni Modoreru. Sugu ni Mata Aeru sa." (Japanese: すぐに戻れる、すぐにまた会えるさ)	February 16, 2013
As the second summer arrives, the Winter Kingdom has improved significantly with the Crimson Scholar sending one of her students, the Merchant Youngster to help the Winter King. After training with Female Knight and tasting Younger Sister Maid's carbonated drink, the Hero heads back to Gateway City as the Black Knight to attend a festival. While feasting with the Eastern Fortress General, the Fire Dragon Princess, daughter of the Archduke Fire Dragon, arrives much to Hero's chagrin as the Princess considers herself as the Black Knight's wife. Realizing time is running out for her, the Scholar brings Hero along with Elder Sister Maid, whom has become her apprentice, to the Iron Nation to show a new invention that will improve the education of the humans, the Printing press. During one night when both the Queen and Female Knight sleep together with Hero, the Queen reveals to Female Knight that she will be going back to the Demon Realm to maintain her rule and go on a ritual that will renew her right to rule and ask her to protect Hero. Before she and Chief Maid head back to the Demon Realm, the Queen gives Elder Sister Maid a magical ring that will change her appearance to look like her so she can attend meetings in her place. Meanwhile, the Crusader Commander is sentenced to death for cowardice and abandoning Gateway City but is rescued by the White Kingdom. Bitter over the Winter Kingdom's success, the White King and the Commander joins forces to devise a plot against them.
8	"Take this sword my Lord."; Transliteration: "Tsurugi o Totte, Waga Aruji." (Japanese: 剣を取って、我が主)	February 23, 2013
Young Merchant pays a visit to the Crimson Scholar's villa and by her instructions, Elder Sister Maid tries to impersonate her with the magical ring, but is unable to deceive him. Hero then intervenes and takes him to the Demon realm where he shows him that the now liberated Gateway City became a thriving metropolis inhabited and ruled by humans and demons alike and have the Fire Dragon Princess hold a banquet to them, where he offers him the right to explore the commerce in the city in exchange to help in his and Demon King's efforts. Meanwhile, the Queen has a short meeting with Female Magician at the Outer Library, before entering into the ritual chambers, instructing Head Maid to kill her should she loses her sanity in the process. Back at the villa, Female Knight offers herself to be properly knighted by Hero in a sign of offering him her eternal loyalty, to which he reluctantly accepts. The Winter King is visited by a representative of the church who orders him to hand over Crimson Scholar, who was branded as a heretic and her teachings blasphemous by the newly elected Pope himself, and he rushes to the villa with Archer to warn the others. To protect the Winter Kingdom from further problems, Hero comes up with a plan, by having Elder Sister Maid, disguised as the Scholar, handed over to the church just to be rescued by Hero in a later occasion.
9	"I am human." Transliteration: "Watashi wa "Ningen" dakara" (Japanese: わたしは"人間"だからっ)	March 2, 2013
Young Merchant learns from his sources that the Central church and Central nations concocted the heresy charges against Crimson Scholar as her work was helping the South being free from Central's influence. Taking action, he has one of Scholar's students, the Noble Youngster, help in his plans. Meanwhile, an Emissary of the church arrives to take Scholar into custody, unaware that she is in fact Elder Sister Maid in disguise. Before a huge crowd, she is accused of heresy, chained and tortured, as Hero awaits for the opportunity to rescue her, but just when Elder Sister Maid is given the chance to speak, she tells everyone she was once a serf. She tells her story of how she lost most of her family during her days of serfdom and until thanks to their deity, the Spirit of Light, she was saved upon offered a chance to rise and stand as a proper human. She tells the crowd the Spirit gave humans the freedom to choose their own fate and no one has the right take it away from them, and allowing anyone to do that makes them insects. Angered, the Emissary orders the crowd to stone her but the crowd, inspired by her words, stone him and his entourage. One of Emissary's guards attempts to execute Elder Sister Maid but is saved by the Winter King, who puts the Scholar under his country's protection and orders the Emissary to leave with Female Knight also calling him and the Central church corrupt, and declares Scholar a saint. The Emissary flees and vows the Winter Kingdom will pay for their heresy. Meanwhile, a blue-skinned demon has visions of Elder Sister Maid which disturbs him while a mysterious entity laments on what is happening right now.
9.5	"There's more to this story than useless flesh!" Transliteration: "Kono Monogatari wa, Da Niku Dake Dewanai no Ja!" (Japanese: この物語は、駄肉だけではないのじゃ!)	March 9, 2013
A special recap episode about the events of the series. It is narrated by Ichirō Nagai as Storyteller (語り部, Kataribe) and Shō Hayami as Storyteller Youngster (語り部子弟, Kataribe Shitei).
10	"So now their plans are finally coming to fruition?" Transliteration: "Ano Hito ga Oita Fuseki ga, Iyoiyo Imi o Motte Kuru no ka" (Japanese: あの人が置いた布石が、いよいよ意味を持ってくるのか)	March 16, 2013
The Southern kingdoms join forces to defy the Central nations by ending serfdom and lower taxes to encourage people to immigrate to the South and the Lakeside Convent separates from the Central Church to form the True Church of the Light Spirit with pamphlets and bards spreading their message. Meanwhile, Young Merchant begins buying wheat from the Central nobles with futures contracts which causes food prices to rise as part of his plans. Fearing their food supplies will run out if Central continues importing their food, the South enacts trade tariffs and taxes on exports. Meanwhile in Gateway city, Fire Dragon Princess informs East Fortress General that the Blue Demon clan are up to something while she later meets with Young Merchant in the Human Realm to buy salt as the demons are running out of salt. As Central declares war on the South due to their trade restrictions, Hero asks the Winter King to buy time before the battle begins as he tries to find a way to prevent needless bloodshed between both sides.
11	"I just destroy and kill, without creating anything." Transliteration: "Kowashitari Koroshitari Suru Bakkari de, Nannimo Tsukuttenaikara" (Japanese: 壊したり殺したりするばっかりで、何にも作ってないから)	March 23, 2013
As Young Merchant and Fire Dragon Princess learns that Central intends to install a new currency to prevent inflation, Winter King and Hero are informed an army led by the Blue Demon clan has emerged from the portal to the Demon Realm and intends to attack from the south. Hero departs to confront the Blue Demon clan alone, allowing the Southern Alliance to focus on the incoming invasion from the north and much to his surprise, he reunites with Female Magician on the way there. Meanwhile in the Demon Realm, the Queen emerges from the chamber possessed by the spirits of the ancient Demon Kings and Chief Maid manages to push her back inside, despite having her right arm cut off by her. Young Merchant, accompanied by Fire Dragon Princess exposes to Merchant Youngster his intention to have the Southern Nations establish their own currency and extend the Merchant Alliance trade with the Demon Realm. In the occasion, Fire Dragon Princess reveals her true self to him, and that she is an envoy of the Demons of Gateway City. The White Night Cavalry led by the Crusader Commander launches a surprise attack to the East of the Iron Kingdom in retaliation for their serfs leaving the country for the Winter, Ice and Iron nations. However, the attack fails thanks the advanced tactics Warrior Youngster learned from Crimson Scholar and Female Knight. Upon learning of the situation, Female Magician instructs Hero to destroy the magic portal linking both realms after she drives away the entire Blue Demon army by having all of them teleported away at once. Passing through the hole created by the explosion, Hero arrives at the Demon Realm and realizes that both Realms are actually located in the same world, like two sides of a coin. As Female Knight moves on with her plan to have the local peasants offer spoiled fodder to sicken the Central Army's horses and hinder their plans, Hero finally reaches the Queen, just to be attacked by her possessed self.
12	"– I'm back, my Hero. – You sleep too much, my Demon King."; Transliteration: "Mata Seta na, Watashi no Yūsha. Nebō Shi Sugida, Ore no Maō." (Japanese: 待たせたな、わたしの勇者 寝坊しすぎだ、おれの魔王)	March 30, 2013
Female Magician appears before the Winter King and delivers him instructions from Crimson Scholar on how to develop a vaccine for smallpox which might convince Central to make peace with the South. Back in the Demon Realm, Hero manages to help the Queen force out the ancient Demon Kings from her body. As Hero reattaches Chief Maid's arm, he explains to the Queen what has happened since she left the Human Realm. Meanwhile in the Iron kingdom, Crusader Commander finds the Maid Sisters in a printing factory and attempts to kill Elder Sister Maid, believing she is Crimson Scholar, but is rescued by Warrior Youngster, who fights the Commander and pushes him off the top floor to his death. At the Central Army camp, the mercenaries become angry and restless as they don't have enough food, their horses sick and the Central leaders are squabbling over unclaimed spoils of war rather than attacking the South now. A mercenary captain leads his cavalry to attack the Southern Army camp but are thwarted by Female Knight and her better armed cavalry using hit-and-run tactics. With winter finally arriving, the Central Army are forced to retreat. Back at the Central Nations, it is revealed that the Blue Demons, together with the Central leaders and Central Church and are the true conspirators responsible for the war, and are planning a new Crusade against the South with matchlock firearms, whose design they stole from one of Scholar's collaborators in the Iron nation. Back at the Demon Realm, the Queen makes her official appearance to her subjects since her battle with Hero and summons a meeting with the other Demon leaders, which some demons see as a sign of full scale war with the humans, much to her dismay. Thanks to the truce between Central and the South, the Alliance supply potatoes to feed Central as Young Merchant convinces the Southern leaders of opening trade with the Demons. After dinner at the villa with Hero, Female Knight and the Maid Sisters, the Queen and Chief Maid discuss on how they helped humanity but the one they didn't expected and were proud of is what Elder Sister Maid did.
