= Charles Brode =

American politician

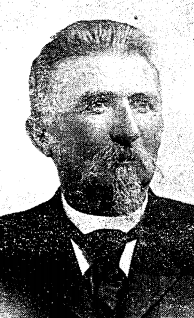
- Brode

Member of the Los Angeles Common Council
- In office December 5, 1878 – March 13, 1879

Personal details
- Born: February 6, 1836 Boreck, Posen, Prussia
- Died: August 13, 1901 (aged 65)

Charles Brode was a merchant and property owner in 19th Century Los Angeles, California. He was a member of that city's governing body, the Los Angeles Common Council, from December 5, 1878, to March 13, 1879, when he resigned.

== Early life ==
Brode was born in Boreck, Posen, Prussia, on February 6, 1836, and at the age of nineteen he emigrated to Australia, where he was a miner for seven years. He then came to the United States, where he engaged in "various kinds of business" in the territories of Montana, Idaho and Utah.

== Career ==
He moved to Los Angeles in 1868 and opened a grocery store on South Spring Street, where the Parisian Suit and Cloak Company was later situated. next to the Hollenbeck Hotel. The building he constructed there was known as the Brode Block.

Brode was a director of the German-American Savings Bank and of the Los Angeles Soap Company. He was a member of the Odd Fellows, Turnverein Germania (charter member) and Pioneers' Society of California.

== Death ==
He died of stomach cancer on August 13, 1901, and was survived by his wife and six children, Mrs. Emma Friese, Mrs. Louise Bruning, A.C. Brode, W.C. Brode, Mrs. Oscar Lawler and Leopold Brode.

== Notes ==
- Newspaper clippings and references are held at the Western States Jewish History Archive, UCLA Library, Department of Special Collections.
