= White Queen =

White Queen may refer to:

== Literature and entertainment ==
- White Queen (Through the Looking-Glass), a character in Lewis Carroll's Through the Looking-Glass (1871)
- White Queen (novel), a 1991 novel by Gwyneth Jones, the first of her Aleutian Trilogy
- The White Queen (novel), a 2009 novel by Philippa Gregory based on the life of Elizabeth Woodville (c. 1437–1492), Queen consort of England
- The White Queen (TV series), a 2013 British serial drama based on the Gregory novel and its sequels
- Lacus Clyne or White Queen, a character in the Gundam science fiction media franchise
- White Queen, a character in the Nick Velvet novel series by Edward D. Hoch
- "White Queen (As It Began)", a song by Queen from Queen II
- Red Queen and White Queen, a holographic computer from Resident Evil: Extinction

== In comics ==
- Emma Frost or the White Queen, a Marvel Comics character
- Adrienne Frost or the White Queen, a Marvel Comics character
- Sat-Yr-9 or the White Queen, a Marvel Comics character
- Amanda Waller or the White Queen, a DC Comics character
- Valentina Vostok or the White Queen, a DC Comics character

== Other ==
- White Queen tomato, a tomato variety
- Queen (chess)
- Claude Njiké-Bergeret, development aid volunteer

== See also ==
- White King (disambiguation)
