= Doctor Mid-Nite (Pieter Cross) =

DC Comics superhero

Publication information
- Publisher: DC Comics
- First appearance: Doctor Mid-Nite #1 (September 1999)
- Created by: Matt Wagner; John K. Snyder III

In-story information
- Alter ego: Dr. Pieter Anton Cross
- Species: Metahuman
- Team affiliations: Justice Society of America; Justice League
- Notable aliases: Doctor Midnight
- Abilities: Perfect night vision Ability to see in the dark via infrared lenses Great physician and scientist Employs special ultrasonic lenses and "blackout bombs"

Doctor Mid-Nite (Pieter Cross) (also Doctor Midnight) is a fictional superhero in DC Comics, the third character named Doctor Mid-Nite, first appearing in Doctor Mid-Nite #1.

Much like the original version of Doctor Mid-Nite, he has exhibited the same basic features: a cowled costume featuring a crescent moon symbol, keen ability to see in the darkness at the cost of near or total blindness in sunlight, the use of special visors and "blackout" smoke bombs to gain tactical advantage in combat, a high degree of skill in martial arts, and jobs as physicians serving both normal human beings and "metahuman" superheroes. Additionally, two of the doctors have been accompanied by sidekick owls.

== Fictional character biography ==
The third Doctor Mid-Nite (and the second to use the original spelling) is Pieter Anton Cross. Cross makes his first appearance in the 3-issue prestige format limited series Doctor Mid-Nite (1999).

Cross is the Norwegian-born son of a noted scientist, the late Theodoric Cross. Pieter was delivered as a baby by the original Doctor Mid-Nite, Charles McNider, who had just rescued his mother from vagrants. As an adult, Pieter is unable to save his mother from Chagas disease, which she catches in Brazil while visiting him.

Cross's crime-fighting career begins as he runs a free clinic in Portsmouth, Washington. His work leads him to investigate a new street drug called A39, an accidental derivative of the steroid-like Venom. The drug, he soon learns, is produced by an evil corporation named Praeda Industries, run by the Terrible Trio. Cross is drugged by company enforcers and soon involved in a car accident. After the accident, he finds that he can only see in pitch darkness. Stripped of his license to officially practice medicine, Cross takes the name Doctor Mid-Nite and resolves to fight crime. Cross joins the newest incarnation of the Justice Society of America, and has a brief romance with teammate Black Canary.

Cross is usually portrayed as being a physician first and vigilante second, setting up a clinic to help him treat patients who cannot afford conventional health care. Scanners in his cowl-lenses identify health risks as well as threats. He is a vegetarian and practices yoga (JSA). Cross carries high-tech medical equipment in addition to weapons (including blackout bombs). Some individuals whom Cross assists eventually come to aid him in his work as both crime fighter and community surgeon. Allies gained in this way include reformed street kids Nite Lite and Ice Sickle, and writer Camilla Marlowe. Mid-Nite also serves as a mentor to Jaime Reyes, the third Blue Beetle.

When the Justice Society encounters Gog, last survivor of the Third World, the benevolent being restores Cross's vision. Although initially a blessing, this works to Cross's disadvantage in the field, as he has lost his infrared vision and can no longer able see through his own dark bombs. Eventually, the full JSA mount an all-out assault on Gog, having learned from Sandman that Gog is rooting himself into the Earth. The other Society members following Gog attempt to protect him, until they see him attempt to attack a Society member. All of the followers take up the fight, and Gog punishes them by taking away his blessings, including Cross's sight.

In "The New Golden Age", Pieter Cross still operates as Doctor Mid-Nite and is currently living in Natal, Brazil. Jay Garrick brings his daughter Judy Garrick to visit him and enlists his help in finding Doctor Elemental. Elemental dispatches Ro-Bear and several robots as a distraction so that he can kidnap Judy. After Elemental is thwarted and escapes, Mid-Nite is seen with Joan Garrick and Mister Terrific outside of Jay's hospital room.

== Powers and abilities ==
Doctor Mid-Nite has perfect night vision. He uses special infrared goggles to help him see outside darkness and makes use of "blackout bombs".

== Collected editions ==
The introductory mini-series of the modern Dr. Mid-Nite (Pieter Cross) has been collected in a trade paperback.

Title	Material collected	Writers/Pencillers	ISBN
Doctor Mid-Nite TPB (2000)	Doctor Mid-Nite #1-3	Matt Wagner, John K. Snyder III	ISBN 1-56389-607-9

== In other media ==
- Pieter Cross appears in Young Justice, voiced by Bruce Greenwood.
- Pieter Cross / Doctor Mid-Nite received an action figure from DC Direct.
