= Sasha Bordeaux =

- Sasha Bordeaux as depicted in Checkmate (vol. 2) #4 (July 2006) by Lee Bermejo

Publication information
- Publisher: DC Comics
- First appearance: Detective Comics #751 (December 2000)
- Created by: Greg Rucka; Shawn Martinbrough

In-story information
- Alter ego: Sasha Bordeaux
- Species: Human cyborg
- Team affiliations: Checkmate; A.R.G.U.S.
- Notable aliases: Black Queen, Black King's Bishop
- Abilities: An OMAC cyborg independent of Brother Eye, also infrared vision in cybernetic eye, resistant to telepathy.

Sasha Bordeaux is a fictional character appearing in American comic books published by DC Comics. The character was initially primarily associated with Batman, and subsequently evolved an association with Checkmate in two of its incarnations.

Bordeaux appears in the DC Universe series Peacemaker, portrayed by Sol Rodríguez.

== Publication history ==
The character was created by Greg Rucka and Shawn Martinbrough, and first appeared in Detective Comics #751 (December 2000).

== Fictional character biography ==
=== Origin ===
Sasha Bordeaux is a Secret Service agent turned private contractor who is hired as head of Bruce Wayne's personal security at the insistence of WayneCorp's second-in-command, Lucius Fox, against Wayne's wishes. Wayne at first tries to avoid her, but she keeps on doing her job.

She eventually becomes suspicious of his constant late-night disappearances, does some searching, and is shocked to find that Bruce Wayne is secretly Batman. Since she already knows his secret identity, Batman decides to train her. After weeks of hard work, she becomes fit enough to go out with him on patrol, though he still treats her as a stranger. During this time, she falls in love with him, even though he is dating other women.

=== Framed ===
One night while Batman and Bordeaux are out on patrol, David Cain lures Wayne's ex-girlfriend Vesper Fairchild to Wayne Manor and kills her, framing Wayne in the process. Both Wayne and Bordeaux are charged with murder, and Bordeaux refuses to exonerate herself by giving up Wayne's secret despite the fact that they were patrolling separate areas at the time of the murder and she cannot be sure of Wayne's innocence. They are both arraigned and held without bail while awaiting trial. After a while, Batman escapes to leave his alter ego behind, leaving Bordeaux inside Blackgate Penitentiary. Although Bordeaux is briefly offered her freedom if she testifies against Wayne - even contemplating taking the deal after Wayne abandons her - a meeting with Alfred Pennyworth leaves her resolved to reject the offer. Alfred helps her realize that Wayne truly valued her work, rather than using her without any thought for herself, as otherwise he would never have allowed her to accompany him as Batman. Batman eventually confronts those who framed him, and Wayne and Bordeaux are cleared of all charges.

=== Checkmate ===
While in prison custody, Bordeaux is severely wounded by another prisoner and would have died had the government agency Checkmate not given her medical treatment. They fake her death and offer to give her a new name and identity (complete with plastic surgery) if she works for them. With no other options, she agrees.

Batman tirelessly searches for Bordeaux, not believing she died in prison. To facilitate this, he disrupts all of Checkmate's operations in Gotham City. The group eventually organizes a meeting between the two, where Wayne confesses his love for her. Bordeaux, though feeling the same way, realizes that her new life would prevent them from being together and tells him to let her go.

Over time, Bordeaux rises through the ranks of Checkmate and becomes right hand to Maxwell Lord, the group's leader. Lord later hijacks the Brother Eye satellite that Batman created to monitor superhuman activity. He also creates a cyborg army known as OMACs (humans transformed by a virus) programmed to hunt and kill superhumans or specific targets. During his rule, Lord kills all who oppose him, assisted by Brother I. Bordeaux feigns loyalty to stay alive, but breaks the pretense when Lord kills his former ally Ted Kord. Bordeaux sends Kord's trademark goggles to Batman as part of a message detailing Lord's madness.

After revealing Bordeaux's betrayal, Brother I sends out an OMAC squad, who finds Bordeaux and Batman in an abandoned warehouse just after they share a kiss. The OMACs' goal of killing Batman and taking Bordeaux only partly succeeds, as Batman escapes. Realizing he cannot get any information out of Bordeaux, Lord imprisons her and brainwashes Superman in an attempt to kill Batman, only to be killed by Wonder Woman.

=== Cyborg ===
Bordeaux escapes and sets out to kill Lord, unaware he is already dead. As they are on their way out, an OMAC attacks the two and impales Bordeaux, turning her into an OMAC cyborg. She retains most of her human features, although her skin now has a metallic coating and one of her eye sockets is empty. She also retains her free will, unlike the other OMACs.

With Lord's death, Brother I rechristens itself "Brother Eye" and activates all the remaining OMACs to kill Earth's superhumans. Bordeaux contacts the other various factions of Checkmate who left after Lord's takeover, apologizing for Lord and asking them to rejoin.

She then creates a computer virus and links to the Brother Eye satellite. The virus, along with a massive electromagnetic pulse blast created by the various superheroes, disables most of the OMACs. Brother I escapes with 200,000 OMACS.

=== Infinite Crisis ===
With the aid of the new Blue Beetle, Batman locates Brother Eye. He then gathers a team of heroes, including Bordeaux, to attempt to destroy it. The attack sends Brother Eye crashing to Earth, but the satellite's central memory remains intact. With the various superheroes needed elsewhere, Batman tasks Bordeaux with destroying Brother Eye. She succeeds and loses her OMAC shell.

=== One year later ===
One year after the "Infinite Crisis" crisis, Bordeaux becomes the "Black Queen" of the Checkmate organization. Her consequentialist attitude towards the success of Checkmate missions puts her into conflict with Alan Scott. She is also in conflict with several of her Checkmate colleagues, particularly Fire and Mister Terrific, with whom she is romantically involved. In a 2007 story arc involving the Outsiders, Chang Tzu tortures Bordeaux to learn more about her cybernetic implants. She is rescued, but has lasting trauma from the event and is transformed into a more mechanical form while healing.

In Manhunter (vol. 3) #27 (January 2007), Bordeaux intervenes in the trial of Wonder Woman (for murdering Maxwell Lord) by secretly delivering exonerating evidence to Wonder Woman's lawyer, Kate Spencer.

=== Final Crisis ===
During the events of Final Crisis, Bordeaux is infected with the Anti-Life Equation, with the OMAC nanites in her body placing her in a coma to prevent the spread of the infection. Mister Terrific realizes they have to re-activate all the OMACS that are left. The only way to do this is to revive Bordeaux and retrieve the OMAC codes from her nanites. The activation of the OMACs is successful, but the revival causes Bordeaux's biological processes to shut down. Mister Terrific and Doctor Mid-Nite keep Bordeaux alive on life support until she is revived.

=== DC Rebirth ===
A new interpretation of Bordeaux debuts in Wonder Woman volume 3 as part of the DC Rebirth initiative. This version is Etta Candy's superior and linked to an evil artificial intelligence who is attempting to manipulate Wonder Woman from afar.

== Powers and abilities ==
Sasha Bordeaux is a skilled hand-to-hand combatant and marksman. After being transformed into an OMAC cyborg, she gains superhuman physical abilities, enhanced vision, and a protective nanomachine coating that appears as human skin to conceal her mechanical form.

== In other media ==
- Sasha Bordeaux appears as a character summon in Scribblenauts Unmasked: A DC Comics Adventure.
- Sasha Bordeaux appears in the second season of Peacemaker, portrayed by Sol Rodríguez. This version is an agent of A.R.G.U.S. and founding member of Checkmate.
