= The OMAC Project =

American comic book limited series

- Cover to The OMAC Project #1, art by Jose Ladrönn.

Publication information
- Publisher: DC Comics
- Schedule: Monthly
- Format: Limited series
- Publication date: (limited series) June – November 2005 (Infinite Crisis Special #1) May 2006
- No. of issues: 6, with 1 Infinite Crisis Special
- Main character(s): Sasha Bordeaux; Maxwell Lord; Batman, Brother I, OMACs

Creative team
- Created by: OMAC created by Jack Kirby
- Written by: Greg Rucka
- Artist(s): Jesus Saiz; Cliff Richards; Bob Wiacek

Collected editions
- The OMAC Project: ISBN 1-4012-0837-1

The OMAC Project is a six-issue American comic book limited series written by Greg Rucka with art by Jesus Saiz and published by DC Comics in 2005.

== Overview ==
The OMAC Project is one of four miniseries leading up to DC Comics' Infinite Crisis event. The series follows the Countdown to Infinite Crisis special, picking up the story where the special left off. The OMACs borrow their name and general appearance from the 1974 Jack Kirby creation OMAC. However, the OMACs differ from the original in other ways, including the term underlying the acronym that forms their name: in Kirby's stories, "OMAC" stands for "One-Man Army Corps", while in this miniseries, "OMAC" stands for "Observational Metahuman Activity Construct".

In the miniseries, OMACs are people who unknowingly harbor invasive technology in their bodies. When activated, the technology can spy on the hosts' surroundings, control their bodies, or transform them into remotely controlled superhuman beings. The hosts of OMAC act as unwitting sleeper agents for Maxwell Lord.

The OMACs are guided by the satellite Brother Eye, as in the original version. Brother Eye is depicted as an artificially intelligent satellite built by Batman to observe the members of the Justice League. Lord takes command of Brother Eye and uses it and the OMACs to stalk and attack the world's superheroes and supervillains, with the avowed goal of reasserting humanity's control over the world.

== Plot ==
Blue Beetle (Ted Kord) is dead, Booster Gold is in the hospital, and the Checkmate organization, led by Maxwell Lord, continues its operations against DC's superheroes. Booster Gold wakes up and, after learning of Ted Kord's disappearance, decides to investigate with the help of Wonder Woman.

OMACs (Observational Meta-human Activity Constructs) have been spotted all over the world and have managed to kill several metahumans. Batman and Wonder Woman investigate the OMACs while Booster, after meeting Guy Gardner in space, decides that he would rather investigate Ted Kord's disappearance with other former members of the Justice League International.

Interwoven through this plot are scenes detailing the power struggle within Checkmate. Checkmate is led by the White Queen, White King, Black Queen, and Black King, each of whom have Knights of corresponding color. Through his machinations, Black King Maxwell Lord becomes the only leader of the organization, despite being double-crossed by one of his own Knights, Sasha Bordeaux.

Wonder Woman kills Lord to prevent him from continuing to direct the actions of a mind-controlled Superman. Brother Eye initiates a protocol specifically designed to be used in the event of Lord's death and OMAC drones worldwide begin to wreak havoc.

Sasha herself is transformed into an OMAC-like being, powered by nanotechnology. She and Batman work to lure most of the OMACs to the Sahara Desert. There, Batman activates an EMP device that disables all of the OMACs, freeing their hosts. The Brother Eye satellite is still hidden and has about 200,000 OMACs under its control. It turns the world against Wonder Woman and the Amazons by broadcasting Lord's murder with no context given.

== The OMAC Project: Infinite Crisis Special #1 - "The Lazarus Protocol" ==
In The OMAC Project: Infinite Crisis Special #1, which takes place after Infinite Crisis #6, Brother Eye crash-lands in the Rub' Al-Khali Desert and takes control of two local sentries. Sasha Bordeaux, returning from a successful attack against Brother Eye in space, is tasked with destroying the remains of Brother Eye. Meanwhile, Amanda Waller is appointed the acting Black King of Checkmate.

While the Israeli, Russian, and Chinese governments begin measures to retrieve the satellite, Brother Eye attempts to remote link to Sasha and take control of her body, but it fails. Sasha arrives at a Checkmate safehouse and attempts to make contact with Jessica Midnight at headquarters, but is stopped by Waller, who demands to know if Sasha is an OMAC or not. Waller instructs Fire to stop Brother Eye from being reactivated, even if it means killing Sasha or Midnight.

As all of the factions reach the downed satellite, Sasha rushes through the ensuing battle to detonate explosives from within Brother Eye's CPU chamber. The computer nearly succeeds in downloading its programming and data files over Sasha's mind when she activates the explosives. Searching the wreckage, Fire and Midnight find Sasha alive and free of the nanobots that she was infected with.

== Collected editions ==
The series was collected, along with Countdown to Infinite Crisis and Wonder Woman #219, in a trade paperback in November 2005 (ISBN 1401208371).
