= Black Prince (disambiguation) =

Black Prince or The Black Prince most commonly refers to Edward the Black Prince (1330–1376), an English prince and military leader.

The Black Prince may also refer to:

== Nickname ==
- Junio Valerio Borghese (1906–1974), Italian World War II navy commander and post-war neo-fascist politician
- Kostas Davourlis (1948–1992), Greek footballer
- Patrick W. Murphy (1837–1901), Canadian-born American politician, and rancher
- Naresuan (1555/1556–1605), King of Ayutthaya, a Siamese kingdom
- Robby Robinson (bodybuilder) (born 1946), American former professional bodybuilder
- Peter Jackson (boxer) (1861–1901), Australian bare-knuckle boxer
- Prince Lee Boo (1764–1784), Palauan prince, one of the first people from the Pacific Islands to visit Great Britain
- Radu Negru, a legendary Romanian ruler also known as Negru Vodă ("Black Prince")
- Maharaja Dalip Singh, nicknamed "Black Prince of Perthshire" during his exile in Britain

== In the military ==
- HMS Black Prince, various ships of the Royal Navy
- Black Prince-class ship of the line, a class of four sailing ships of the Royal Navy
- The British merchantman Black Prince, converted to the man-of-war USS Alfred (1774)
- Black Prince, original name of the USS Warrick (AKA-89), an attack cargo ship
- Black Prince (tank), a development of the Churchill tank

== Vehicles ==
- Black Prince, a GWR 3031 Class Great Western Railway locomotive between 1891 and 1915
- Black Prince, a Standard Class 9F steam locomotive built for British Rail in 1959, named after preservation in 1967
- Black Prince, a Standard Class 7 steam locomotive built for British Railways in April 1951
- Black Prince (rocket), British proposed civilian rocket
- Black Prince (ship), Fred. Olsen Cruise Lines ship
- Black Prince (car), British cyclecar made only in 1920
- Black Prince, car made in small numbers by Invicta between 1946 and 1950
- Vincent Black Prince, British motorcycle

== In entertainment ==
- The Black Prince (play), English Restoration era historical tragedy
- The Black Prince (novel), by Iris Murdoch
- The Black Prince (film), a 2017 Indian film by Kavi Raz about Duleep Singh
- Alias of Lelouch Lamperouge, a character in the anime Code Geass
- "Black Prince" (Schwarzer Prinz), a song in the musical Elisabeth
- Black Prince (musician, born 1880), a Trinidadian calypsonian musician

== Mountains ==
- Black Prince Mountain, British Columbia, Canada
- Mount Black Prince (Alberta), Canada
- Mount Black Prince (Antarctica), Admiralty Mountains

== Plants and insects ==
- Psaltoda plaga, an Australian species of cicada
- Rohana parisatis, an Asian species of butterfly
- Cinsaut, a red wine grape also known as Black Prince
- Trollinger, a German/Italian wine grape also known as Black Prince
- Black Prince, a common cultivar of heirloom tomato

== Other uses ==
- Black Prince Buses, a former bus operating company in England
- Black Prince, Bexley, a hotel and former live music venue in the London Borough of Bexley
- The Black Prince, an account of the life of John Naimbanna, a prince of the Temne people of Sierra Leone
- De Swarte Prinsch, Tytsjerk (English: The Black Prince), a windmill in Tytsjerk, Friesland, the Netherlands

== See also ==
- Alphonse Gangitano, Italian-Australian gangster nicknamed the "Black Prince of Lygon Street"
- Alessandro de' Medici, Duke of Florence (1510–1537), Italian noble sometimes called "The Moor " or "The Black Prince"
- Black King (disambiguation)
