= Black Emperor =

Black Emperor may refer to:

- Black Emperor, a villain character from the Viewtiful Joe series
- God Speed You! Black Emperor, a Japanese documentary film about motorcyclist group 'the Black Emperors'
- Godspeed You! Black Emperor, a Canadian post-rock band named after the above film
- Heidi (god) a Chinese deity called the Black Emperor

== See also ==
- Black Empire (disambiguation)
- Black-chinned emperor tamarin, a New World monkey known for its eminent mustache
- Blackspot emperor, a species of emperor fish
- The Black Emporium, a vendor in Dragon Age II
- Black King (disambiguation)
- Black Queen (disambiguation)
- Black monarch, a species of bird
- Dark Emperor & Other Poems of the Night, a children's poetry book by Joyce Sidman
