= The Dark Prince =

The Dark Prince may refer to:

== Books ==
- Batman: The Dark Prince Charming, a graphic novel series from American comic book publisher DC Comics and French publisher Dargaud
- Dark Prince, a 1999 novel by American author Christine Feehan
- Walt Disney: Hollywood's Dark Prince, a 1994 biography by Marc Eliot of Walt Disney

== Films and TV ==
- Dark Prince: The True Story of Dracula, alternately titled Dracula: The Dark Prince, a 2000 biographical film directed by Joe Chappelle
- Dracula: The Dark Prince, a 2013 American fantasy horror film directed by Pearry Reginald Teo
- The Dark Prince, an antagonist in Beyblade Burst QuadDrive, a 2021 net animation produced by ADK Emotions and animated by OLM

== Video games ==
- Dragon Quest Monsters: The Dark Prince, a 2023 video game developed by Tose and published by Square Enix
- The Dark Prince, an alter ego character of Prince (Prince of Persia) in the Prince of Persia franchise
- The Dark Prince, an antagonist in Sinbad and the Throne of the Falcon, a 1987video game developed and published by Cinemaware
- The Dark Prince, an antagonist in the Puyo Puyo franchise

== People ==
- Michael D'Andrea (born 1954), American spy and administrator, a.k.a. "The Dark Prince"

== See also ==
- Prince of Darkness
- The Black Prince (disambiguation)
