= HMS Wellesley (1815) =

Ship of the line (1815–1948) of the Royal Navy

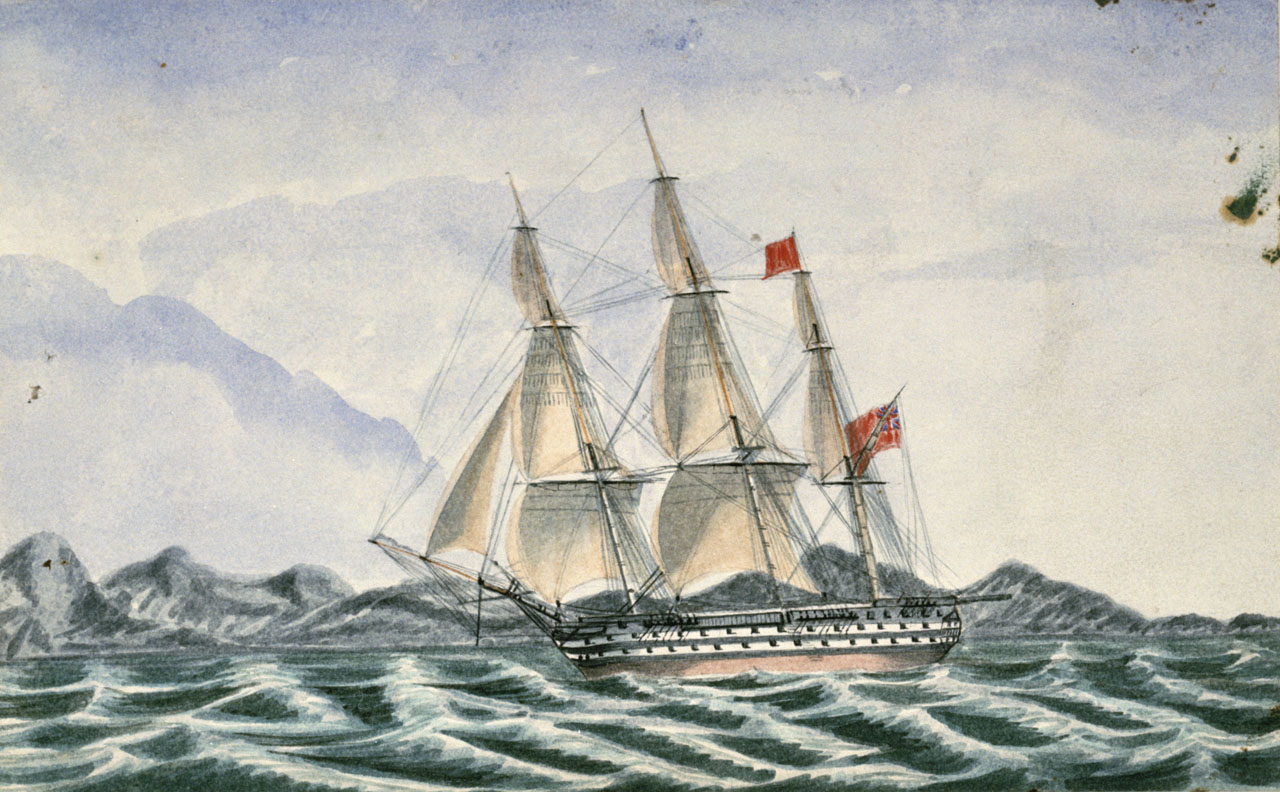
- Wellesley sailing along a rocky coastline

History

United Kingdom
- Name: HMS Wellesley
- Namesake: Arthur Wellesley, 1st Duke of Wellington
- Ordered: 3 September 1812
- Builder: Bombay Dockyard
- Laid down: May 1813
- Launched: 24 February 1815
- Renamed: TS Cornwall, 1868
- Honours and awards: China 1840–42
- Fate: Sunk by bombing, 24 September 1940, raised and broken up 1948

General characteristics
- Class & type: Officially part of the Black Prince class, but built to the lines of the Vengeur class
- Tons burthen: 1745 75/94 (bm)
- Length: o/a:175 ft 10 3/4 in (53.6 m); Keel:144 ft 11 1/2 in (44.2 m) (keel)
- Beam: 47 ft 7 in (14.5 m)
- Depth of hold: 21 ft (6.4 m)
- Sail plan: Full-rigged ship
- Armament: Gundeck: 28 × 32-pounder guns; Upper gundeck: 28 × 18-pounder guns; QD: 4 × 12-pounder guns + 10 × 32-pounder carronades; Fc: 2 × 12-pounder guns + 2 × 32-pounder carronades; Poop deck: 6 × 18-pounder carronades

HMS Wellesley was a 74-gun third rate, named after the Duke of Wellington, and launched in 1815. She captured Karachi for the British, and participated in the First Opium War, which resulted in Britain gaining control of Hong Kong. Thereafter she served primarily as a training ship before gaining the distinction of being the last British ship of the line to be sunk by enemy action and the only one to have been sunk by an air-raid.

== Construction and class ==
Although Wellesley was ordered as a Black Prince-class ship of the line, plans meant for her construction were lost in December 1812 when USS Constitution captured HMS Java. She was therefore built to the lines of HMS Cornwallis, a Vengeur-class ship of the line which had just been launched at Bombay. The East India Company built her of teak, at a cost of £55,147, for the Royal Navy and launched her on 24 February 1815 at Bombay Dockyard.

== Active duty ==
In 1823 Wellesley carried Sir Charles Stuart de Rothesay on a mission to Portugal and Brazil to negotiate a commercial treaty with Pedro I of Brazil. The artist Charles Landseer, brother of the famed artist Edwin Henry Landseer, accompanied the mission.

On 23 November 1824, Wellesley was driven ashore at Portsmouth during a gale. Between 25 November 1824 and 30 January 1825, her tender, Wolf, took several prizes, for which prize money was payable. (Note: A first-class share of the prize money was worth £14 16s 9 1/2d; a sixth-class share, that of an ordinary seaman, was worth 1s 9 3/4d.)

Wellesley was the flagship of Rear Admiral Sir Frederick Lewis Maitland in the Mediterranean between 1827 and 1830.

=== Karachi ===
On 19 June 1837 Captain Thomas Maitland took command of Wellesley, which became the flagship of Rear-Admiral Frederick Lewis Maitland.

On 2 and 3 February 1839 Wellesley, HMS Algerine and troops captured Kurrachee (modern Karachi). Wellesley sailed into the harbour and proceeded to fire at the mud fort on Manora Island, quickly pulverising it and inducing the local rulers to sign a new treaty with the East India Company.

=== Anglo-Persian Treaty ===
In March 1839 relations between Persia and Britain came to a confrontation over a number of British demands, including that the Shah permit the British a permanent base on Kharg Island, which they had occupied. Attacks on the British Residency in Bushire led to the dispatch of Wellesley and Algerine to Bushire. The outcome was the Anglo-Persian Treaty, signed 28 October 1841, which recognised a mutual freedom to trade in the territory of the other and for the British to establish consulates in Tehran and Tabriz.

Admiral Maitland died on 30 November whilst at sea on board Wellesley, off Bombay; Commodore Sir Gordon Bremer replaced him.

=== First Opium War ===
Wellesley saw active service in the Far East during the First Opium War. Led by Commodore Gordon Bremer in Wellesley, a British expedition captured Chusan in July 1840 after an exchange of gunfire with shore batteries that caused only minor casualties to the British. When she returned from this service, some 27 cannonballs were found embedded in her sides.

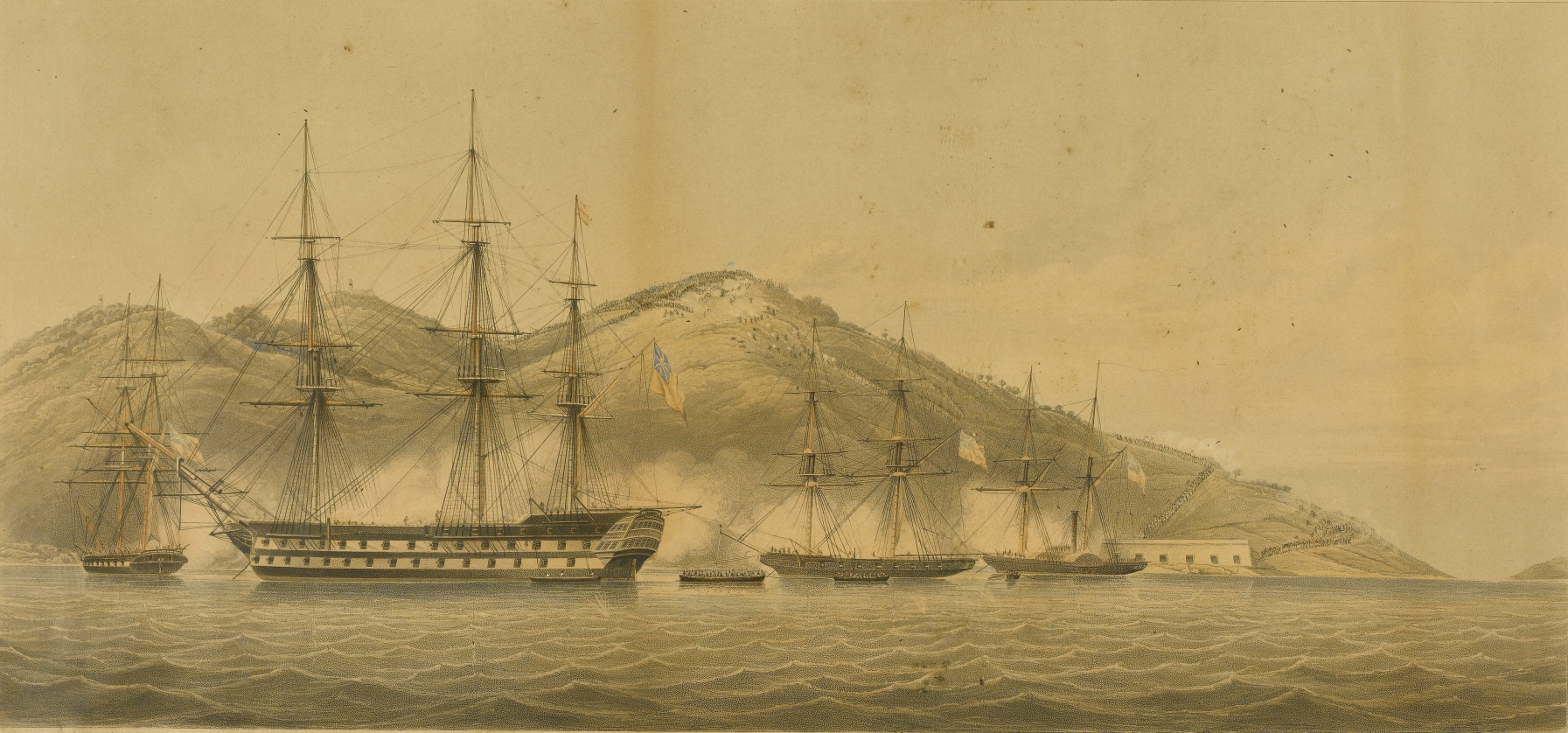
Wellesley (second from left) in the second capture of Chusan on 1 October 1841

On 7 January 1841 she participated in the Second Battle of Chuenpi and the bombardment of fortifications at Tycocktow; both Chuenpi and Tycocktow guarded the seaward approaches to Canton on the Bocca Tigris (Bogue). This campaign resulted in the British taking possession of Hong Kong Island on 26 February 1841.

That same day Wellesley participated in the Battle of the Bogue, which involved bombardments, landings, capture and destruction of nearly all the Chinese forts and fortifications on both sides of the Bocca Tigris up to Canton. Next day, seamen and Royal Marines of the naval squadron attacked and captured the fort, camp and guns at a Chinese position during the Battle of First Bar. The squadron also destroyed the Chinese Admiral's vessel Cambridge, formerly a 34-gun East Indiaman.

Between 23 and 30 May, she participated in joint operations that led to the capture of Canton, and subsequent payment by the Chinese of a six million dollar reparations payment imposed on them. Rear-Admiral Sir William Parker replaced Commodore Sir Gordon Bremer as commander-in-chief of the squadron in China on 10 August.

On 26 August Wellesley participated in the destruction of batteries and defences surrounding Amoy. At one point Captain Maitland placed the Wellesley within 400 yards of the principal battery. This action included the temporary occupation of that town and island, along with its key defensive positions on the island of Gulangyu, which were garrisoned. Lastly, on 1 October the British, who had withdrawn in February, reoccupied Zhoushan and the city of Dinghai. The British proceeded to capture Amoy, Ningbo, Wusong and Shanghai, ending with the seizure of Zhenjiang and closing the entrance to the Grand Canal on 21 July 1842.

For his services during the war, Captain Maitland was nominated a Companion of the Bath. He was knighted in 1843. Some 609 officers, men and marines of Wellesley qualified for the China Medal. In all, 18 crew and 17 marines died, though not all did so in combat.

== Harbour service and training ==
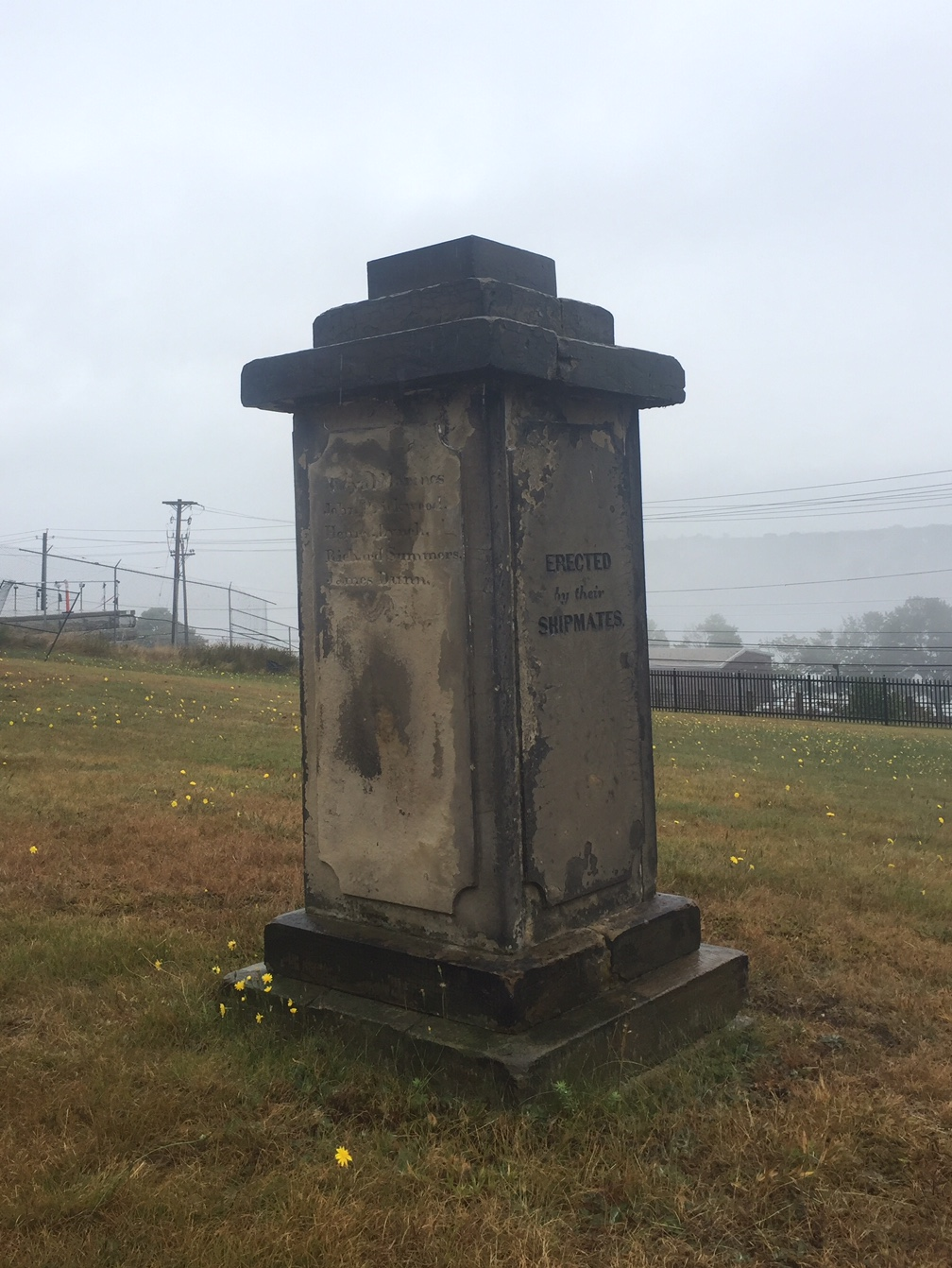
Monument in the Royal Navy Burying Ground (Halifax, Nova Scotia) to the 11 crew of HMS Wellesley who died at Halifax

In 1854 Wellesley was a guard ship at Chatham. That same year she became a harbour flagship and receiving ship at Chatham.

In 1868 the Admiralty loaned her to the London School Ship Society, which refitted her as a Reformatory School. She was renamed Cornwall, replacing HMS Cornwall (1812) in that role, and was moored off Purfleet in April. The ship housed homeless and wayward boys usually for a term of 5 years, up to the age of 18, during which time they received training in trades and seamanship. They were committed the care of the captain which he described as "very much like a family" while aboard. The boys often went on to careers in the armed forces or merchant navy.

Two boys from the ship were put on trial in 1902 for stabbing an officer. The prisoners said they would be willing to plead guilty to the lesser charge of unlawful wounding. They were allowed to return to the Cornwall by the judge.

In 1915, a training cutter Alert launched from TS Cornwall was hit by a tug and sank with the loss of sixteen boys along with the officer in charge. The cutter rapidly sank with nearby boats arriving quickly and rescuing ten boys from the river. The victims were buried in a communal grave at St Clement's Church, West Thurrock.

== Loss ==
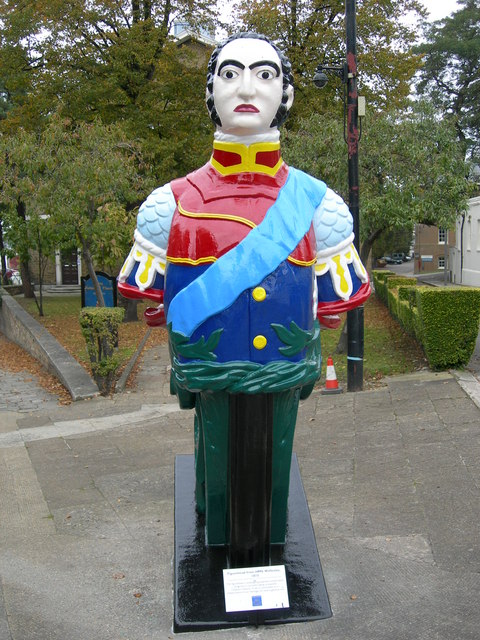
Figurehead of HMS Wellesley

On 24 September 1940 a German air raid severely damaged Wellesley and she subsequently sank. She was raised in 1948 and beached at Tilbury, where she was broken up. Some of her timbers found a home in the rebuilding of the Royal Courts of Justice in London, while her figurehead now resides just inside the main gates of Chatham Dockyard.
