= Mount Black Prince =

Mount Black Prince may refer to:

- Mount Black Prince (Alberta) in Alberta, Canada
- Mount Black Prince (Antarctica) in the Admiralty Mountains of Antarctica
