= HMS Black Prince =

Five ships of the British Royal Navy have been named HMS Black Prince, after Edward the Black Prince (1330–1376), the eldest son of King Edward III of England.

- The first Black Prince was a 10-gun vessel purchased by the Royalists in March 1650, and burnt by Parliamentarians on 4 November of the same year.
- The second HMS Black Prince (1816) was a 74-gun third rate launched in 1816, in use as a prison ship after 1848, and broken up 1855.
- The third HMS Black Prince (1861), launched in 1861, was the second Warrior-class ironclad. Retired to the reserve fleet in 1878; became a training ship in 1896; renamed Emerald in 1903; renamed Impregnable III in 1910; scrapped in 1923.
- The fourth HMS Black Prince (1904), launched in 1904, was a Duke of Edinburgh-class cruiser sunk with all hands during the Battle of Jutland in 1916.
- The fifth HMS Black Prince (81), launched in 1942, was a Dido-class (Bellona subclass) cruiser that saw extensive action in World War II, following which she was transferred to the Royal New Zealand Navy in 1946. She was decommissioned in 1962 and scrapped.

== Battle honours ==
Ships named Black Prince have earned the following battle honours:

- Jutland, 1916
- Arctic, 1944
- Normandy, 1944
- English Channel, 1944
- Aegean, 1944
- South France, 1944
- Okinawa, 1945
