= HMS Hawke (1820) =

Ship of the line of the Royal Navy

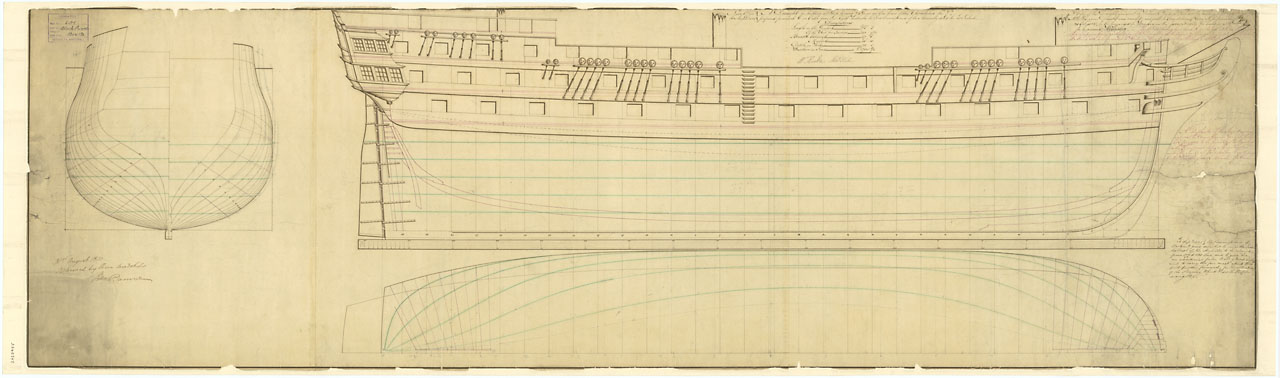
- Hawke

History

United Kingdom
- Name: HMS Hawke
- Ordered: 6 January 1812
- Builder: Woolwich Dockyard
- Laid down: April 1815
- Launched: 16 March 1820
- Fate: Broken up, 1865

General characteristics
- Class & type: Black Prince-class ship of the line
- Tons burthen: 1754 bm
- Length: 176 ft 1 in (53.67 m) (gundeck); 144 ft 10 1/2 in (44.158 m) (keel)
- Beam: 47 ft 8 1/2 in (14.542 m)
- Depth of hold: 21 ft (6.4 m)
- Propulsion: Sails
- Sail plan: Full-rigged ship
- Armament: 74 guns: Gundeck: 28 × 32 pdrs; Upper gundeck: 28 × 18 pdrs; Quarterdeck: 4 × 12 pdrs, 10 × 32 pdr carronades; Forecastle: 2 × 12 pdrs, 2 × 32 pdr carronades; Poop deck: 6 × 18 pdr carronades

HMS Hawke was a 74-gun third rate ship of the line of the Black Prince class of the Royal Navy, launched on 16 March 1820 at Woolwich Dockyard.

She was converted to a screw-propelled 'blockship', fitted with screw propulsion and re-armed with just 60 guns in 1855, and was broken up in 1865.
