= Yang Jing (violinist) =

Chinese violinist

Jing Yang 杨璟
- Born: 1983 (age 42–43); Gulangyu Island, Xiamen, Fujian, China
- Genres: Classical
- Instruments: Viola, Violin; five-string Soprano Viola

Jing Yang (Chinese: 杨璟; pinyin: Yáng Jǐng; born 1983) is a Chinese violist, violinist, and five-string violist.

Along with the pianists Yin Chengzong and Xu Feiping, Jing is considered one of the three most famous classical musicians from Kulangsu, China's "Music Island". She played at the 41st Session of the UNESCO World Heritage Committee to celebrate the inscription of Kulangsu as World Cultural Heritage site.

== Biography ==
Jing was born on the "Piano Island" of Gulangyu Island in Xiamen, Fujian, China. She began studying violin at the age of 4, and was named a member of the Xiamen Philharmonic Orchestra at age 15. At age 17, she took up viola and began studying at the Shanghai Conservatory of Music. At age 21, she received a full scholarship from the Royal Academy of Music in London. She then earned a second degree from the Mozarteum University of Salzburg, Austria, also on full scholarship, where she studied under viola master Thomas Riebl. She became viola principal of Camerata Salzburg and the London Soloists Chamber Orchestra. In 2009, at 25 years old, she was named Associate Principal of the Frankfurt Radio Symphony (Hr-Sinfonieorchester).

In 2012, Jing returned to China, where she was named professor and chair of the viola department at Xiamen University. In 2014 she released her first CD album, "Kulangsu: Through the Strings of Time," which included works of Bach, Paganini, Saint-Saens, Schumann and Sarasate. In 2015, she began touring as a soloist, performing in the Shanghai Concert Hall and other major venues around the world. In 2016, she established the Jing & Friends crossover band, and in 2017 she recorded a single with the punk band Collapsing Scenery. In 2021, Warner Beijing Label released her electronic music single "New World." In 2024, she moved to the United States. She now lives in Princeton, New Jersey, and is president of the Chinese String Musicians Association and a member of U.S.-China Young Leaders' Forum.

== Five-String Soprano Viola ==
In 2016, Jing began playing on a custom five-string soprano viola. In 2017 the Chinese composer Li Zili composed the first concerto for five-string viola and orchestra, the "Peace Concerto", which Yang premiered as a soloist with the Xiamen Philharmonic on August 25, 2017, in a concert held by the Chinese government in honor of the 2017 BRICS Summit in Xiamen.

== Prizes ==
Jing won first prize at the Arthur Bliss Works Competition in England, second prize at the Lionel Tertis International Viola Competition, and third prize at the Bled Viola International Competition in Slovenia. She won the prize for "Best Interpretation of a Contemporary Work" at the International Bodensee Music Competition.
