= Black Empire =

Black Empire may refer to:

- Black Empire (novel), a 1938 speculative fiction novel by George S. Schuyler
- Black Empire (Anthem album)

== See also ==
- Black Emperor (disambiguation)
- The Black Vampire, a 1953 Argentine film
