= Black Queen =

(The) Black Queen may refer to:

== Architecture ==
- The Black Queen, Lightning Ridge, a house, lamp museum and theatre made of 14,000 glass bottles in Lightning Ridge, NSW

== Literature ==
- Black Queen, a novel by Michael Morpurgo
- Black Queen (comics), a number of comic characters of the same name

== Television ==
- "The Black Queen" (House of the Dragon), an episode of the first season of House of the Dragon

== Music ==
=== Bands ===
- The Black Queen (band), an American band
- "Black Queen" Korean dance/dance cover group

=== Songs ===
- "The Black Queen", a song by Paolo Conte from Razmataz 2000
- "Black Queen", a 1970 song on Stephen Stills (album)
- "The March Of The Black Queen", a 1974 song from by British rock band Queen from their Queen II album
- "Oh Black Queen, Oh You're Mine", a 1993 song by Greek metal band Nightfall and the first single.

== Games ==
- The black Queen chess piece
- The black Queen playing card
- Ogre Battle: The March of the Black Queen, a video game, whose name was inspired by two Queen songs

== See also ==
- Black King (disambiguation)
