= Black Queen, Lightning Ridge =

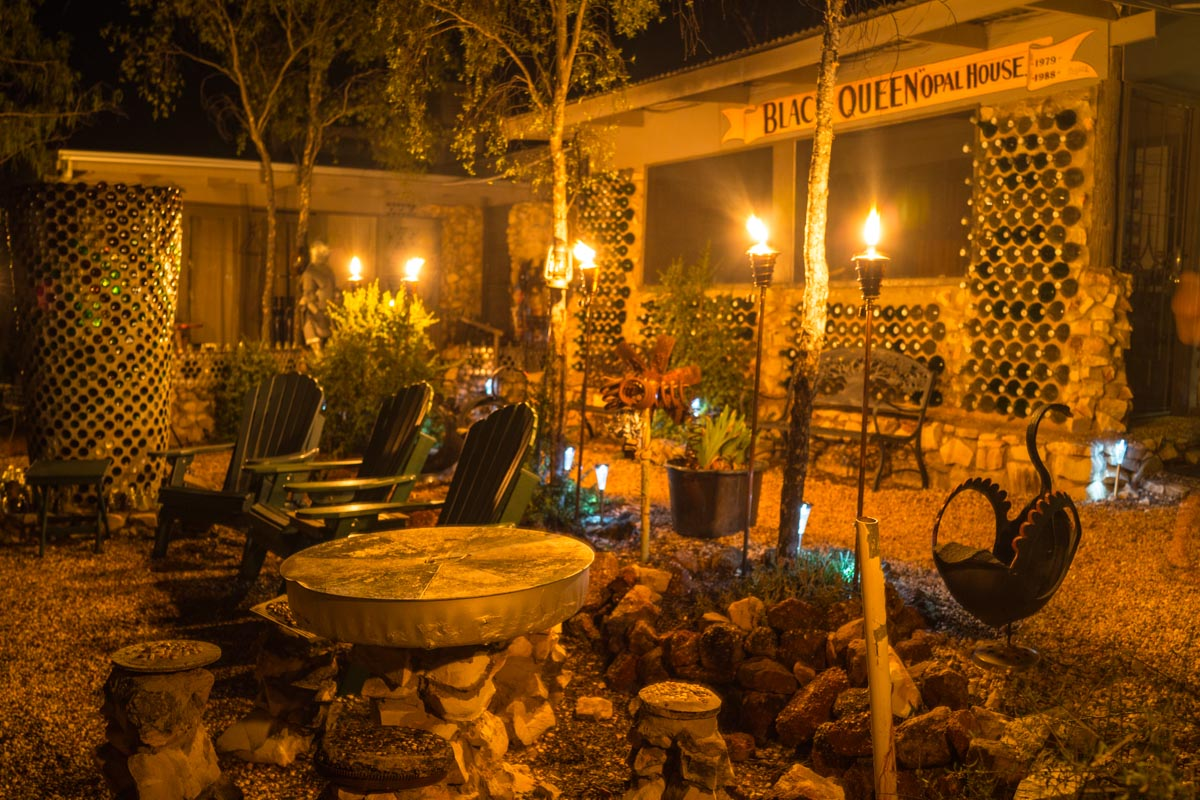
- The Black Queen
- Interactive map of the Black Queen, Lightning Ridge area

General information
- Location: Sims Hill, Lightning Ridge, Australia
- Coordinates: 29°25′42″S 147°59′37″E

Website
- The Black Queen

The Black Queen is a house made of 14,000 glass bottles located in Lightning Ridge in outback NSW, Australia, and a theatre show of the same name at the same location.

== History ==
The house was built by local woman Joan Andrews, who, while in her 60s and recovering from breast cancer, fashioned it by hand. Joan Andrews was inducted into the Pioneer Woman's Hall of Fame on her 88th birthday. Her inspiring story was written and performed as a theatre piece titled ‘Legacy & Light’. This performance won 11 Australian Tourism Awards. Gale Collins last performance of 'Legacy and Light' in Lightning Ridge was scheduled for the 25 October 2014.
