= Black King =

Black King may refer to:

- The black king (chess)
- A black king (playing card), either the King of Spades or the King of Clubs
- Black King (comics), a number of comics characters
- Black King, a character in Syphon Filter: Dark Mirror
- Black King (Ultra monster), a kaiju from Return of Ultraman
- Lampropeltis getula, the Black King Snake
- The Black King (film), a 1932 race film starring A.B. DeComathiere
- Dub, King of Scotland, King of Alba, occasionally referred to as The Black King

== See also ==
- Black Is King, a 2020 film and visual album by Beyoncé
- Black Queen (disambiguation)
- The Black Prince (disambiguation)
