= Black Prince-class ship of the line =

1815 class of British third-rate ships of the line

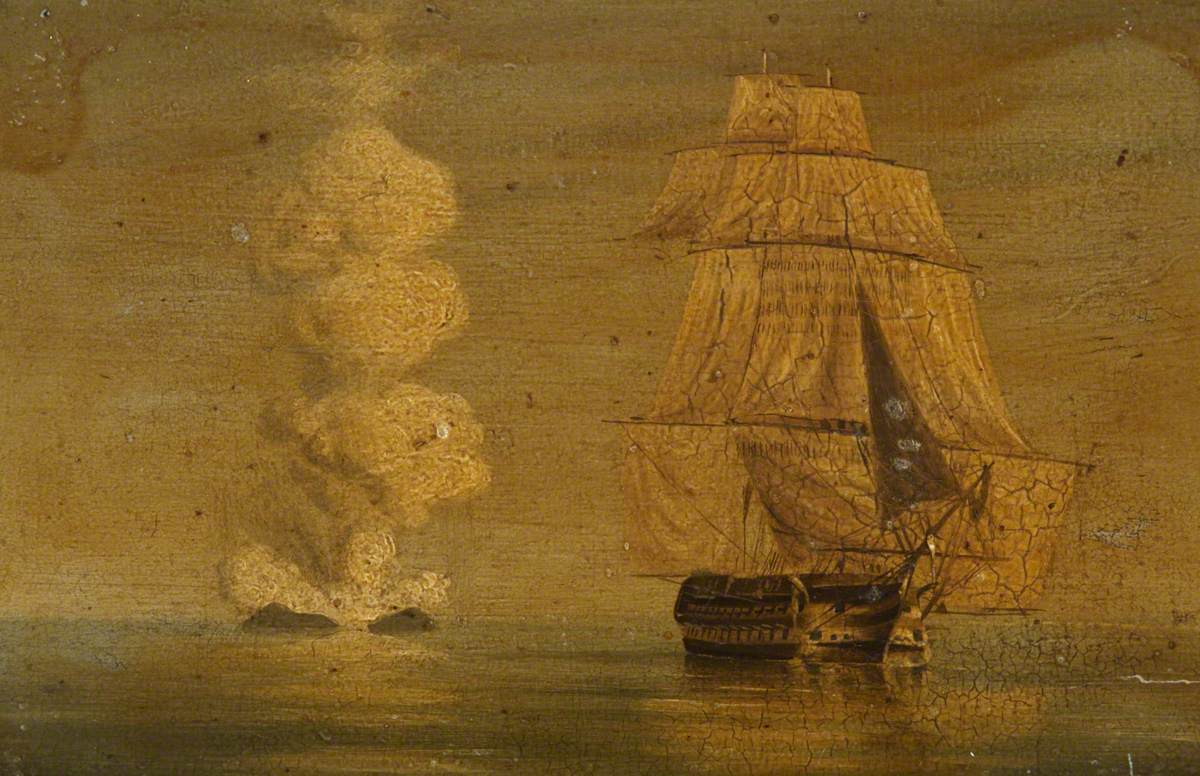
- HMS Melville

Class overview
- Name: Black Prince
- Operators: Royal Navy
- Preceded by: Vengeur class
- In service: 24 February 1815 - 1940
- Completed: 4

General characteristics
- Type: Ship of the line
- Length: 176 ft (54 m) (gundeck); 144 ft 9 7/8 in (44.142 m) (keel)
- Beam: 47 ft 6 in (14.48 m)
- Propulsion: Sails
- Armament: 74 guns: Gundeck: 28 × 32-pounders; Upper gundeck: 28 × 18-pounders; Quarterdeck: 4 × 12-pounders, 10 × 32-pounder carronades; Forecastle: 2 × 12-pounders, 2 × 32-pounder carronades; Poop deck: 6 × 18-pounder carronades

The Black Prince-class ships of the line were a class of four 74-gun third rates built for the Royal Navy in the closing years of the Napoleonic War. The draught for this class of ship was essentially a reduced version of the captured Danish ship Christian VII.

Wellesley, while ordered to be built to this design and always officially so classified, was actually built to the design of and used the moulds of Cornwallis, a Vengeur/Armada-class ship previously built at Bombay; this was because the set of plans sent from the Navy Board and intended for the construction of Wellesley were lost en route to India when the ship carrying them was captured and burnt by the Americans. Wellesley later gained the distinction in 1940 of being the only ship of the line to be sunk by air attack.

Hawke was converted to screw propulsion in the 1850s when adapted as a 60-gun "blockship".

== Ships ==
- HMS Wellesley

Builder: Bombay Dockyard
Ordered: 6 January 1812
Begun: May 1813
Launched: 24 February 1815
Fate: Sunk in air attack by the Luftwaffe, 1940

- HMS Black Prince

Builder: Woolwich Dockyard
Ordered: 14 August 1810
Begun: July 1814
Launched: 30 March 1816
Fate: Broken up, 1855

- HMS Melville

Builder: Bombay Dockyard
Ordered: 6 September 1813
Begun: July 1815
Launched: 17 February 1817
Fate: Sold, 1873

- HMS Hawke

Builder: Woolwich Dockyard
Ordered: 6 January 1812
Begun: April 1815
Launched: 16 March 1820
Fate: Broken up, 1865
