= Ouddeelsmolen =

Smock mill in Tytsjerk, Netherlands

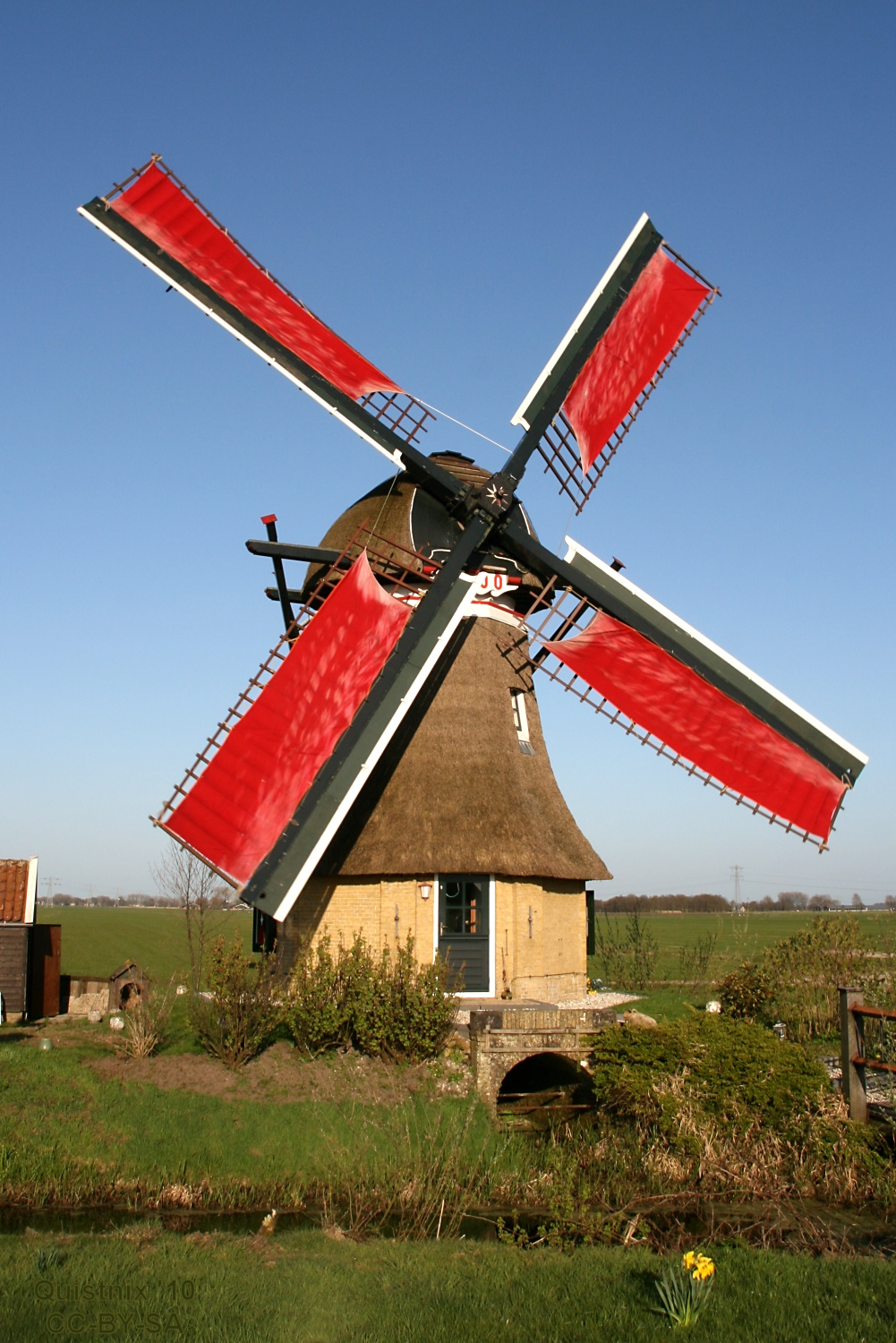
- De Lytse Geast, April 2010.

Origin
- Mill name: De Lytse Geast; De Swarte Prinsch; Ouddeelsmolen
- Mill location: Alddiel 4a, 9255 DG, Tytsjerk
- Coordinates: 53°12′00″N 5°52′02″E
- Operator(s): Private
- Year built: 1900

Information
- Purpose: Drainage mill
- Type: Smock mill
- Storeys: One storey smock
- Base storeys: One storey base
- Smock sides: Eight sides
- No. of sails: Four sails
- Type of sails: Common sails
- Winding: Tailpole and winch
- Type of pump: Archimedes' screw

The Ouddeelsmolen, also known as Lytse Geast or Swarte Prinsch (Black Prince), is a smock mill located in Tytsjerk, Friesland, Netherlands. Built in 1900, the mill has been converted to a holiday cottage. It has been restored to allow it to turn in the wind and is listed as a Rijksmonument.

== History ==
A mill was built on this site in 1832. The Ouddeelsmolen was constructed in 1900 by millwrights Sipke Jelles and Jelle Sipkes Lenstra from Wolvega, Friesland. It was originally built to drain the Ouddeel polder. The mill remained operational until 1963, when it was equipped with Patent sails.

Now converted to holiday accommodation, it was restored in 1994 by Aannemingsbedrijf Thijs Jellema of Burdaard, Friesland and new sails were added. It is listed as a Rijksmonument, No.35688.

== Description ==
The Ouddeelsmolen is what the Dutch describe as a Grondzeiler. It is a one-storey smock mill on a single storey base. Unlike other mills, it has no stage, with the sails reaching almost to ground level. The mill is winded using a tailpole and winch. Both the smock and cap are thatched and the sails are Common sails, with a span of 16.42 metres (53 ft 10 in).

The sails are mounted on a cast iron windshaft, which was cast in 1898 by J M de Muinck Keizer in Martenshoek, Groningen. The windshaft supports the brake wheel, which has 44 cogs. The mill formerly drove an Archimedes' screw.

== Operators ==
- Pieter Willems de Boer (1900–24)
- Mhr. Tiemersma (1924– )
- Mhr. Adema ( -1963)

References for above:-
