= Gulangyu =

UNESCO World Heritage Site in Fujian, China

Kulangsu, a Historic International Settlement
UNESCO World Heritage Site
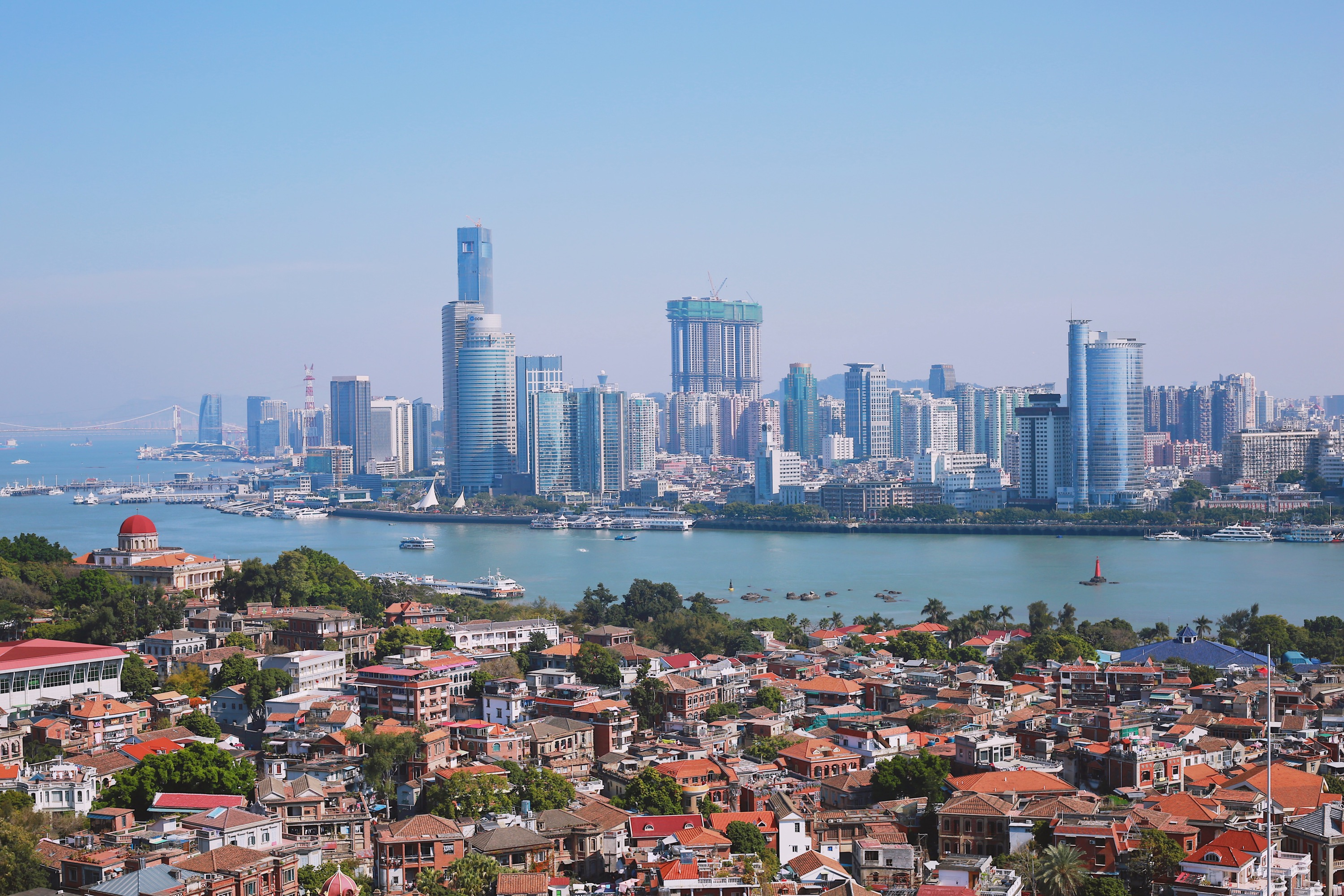
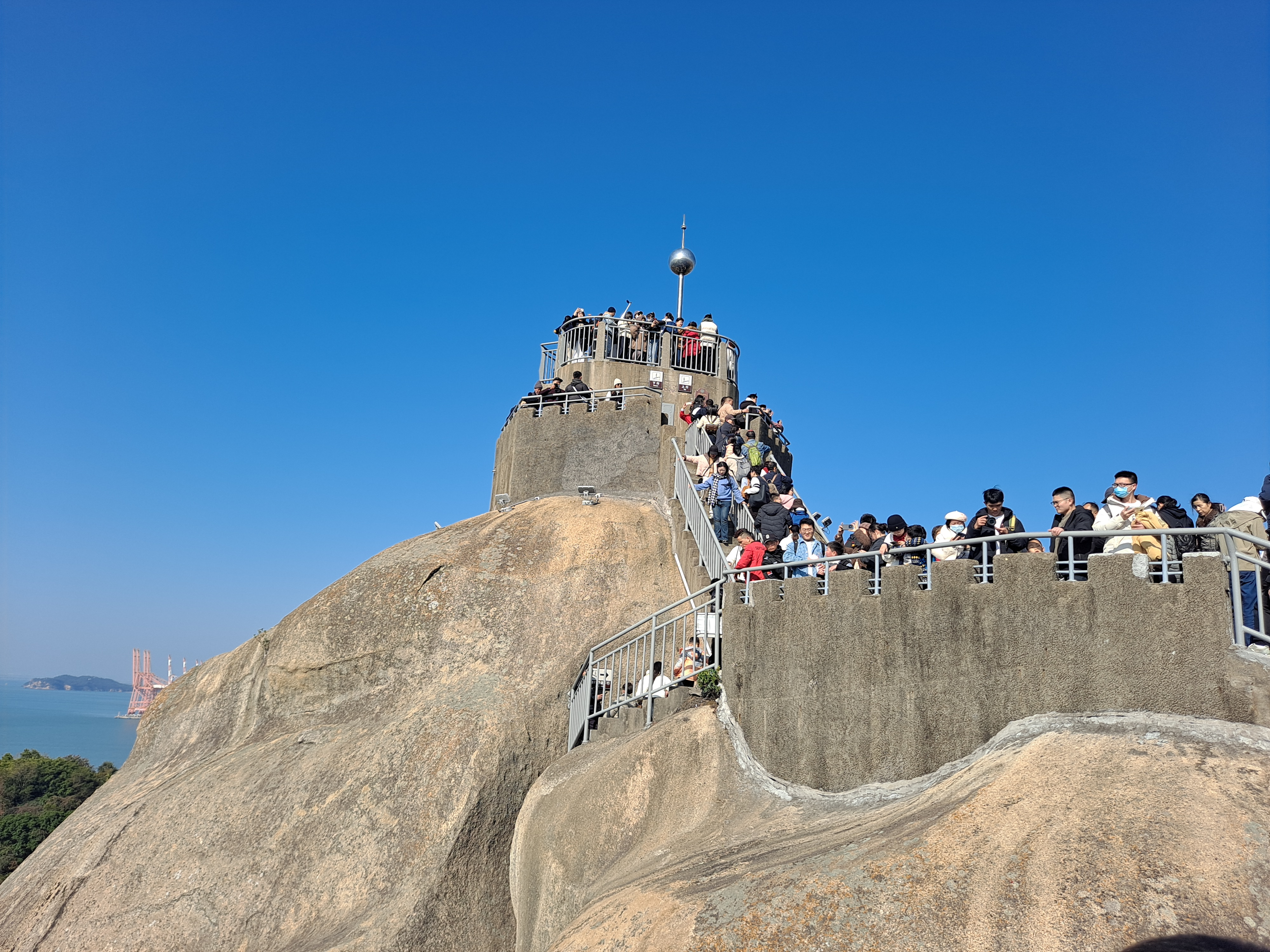
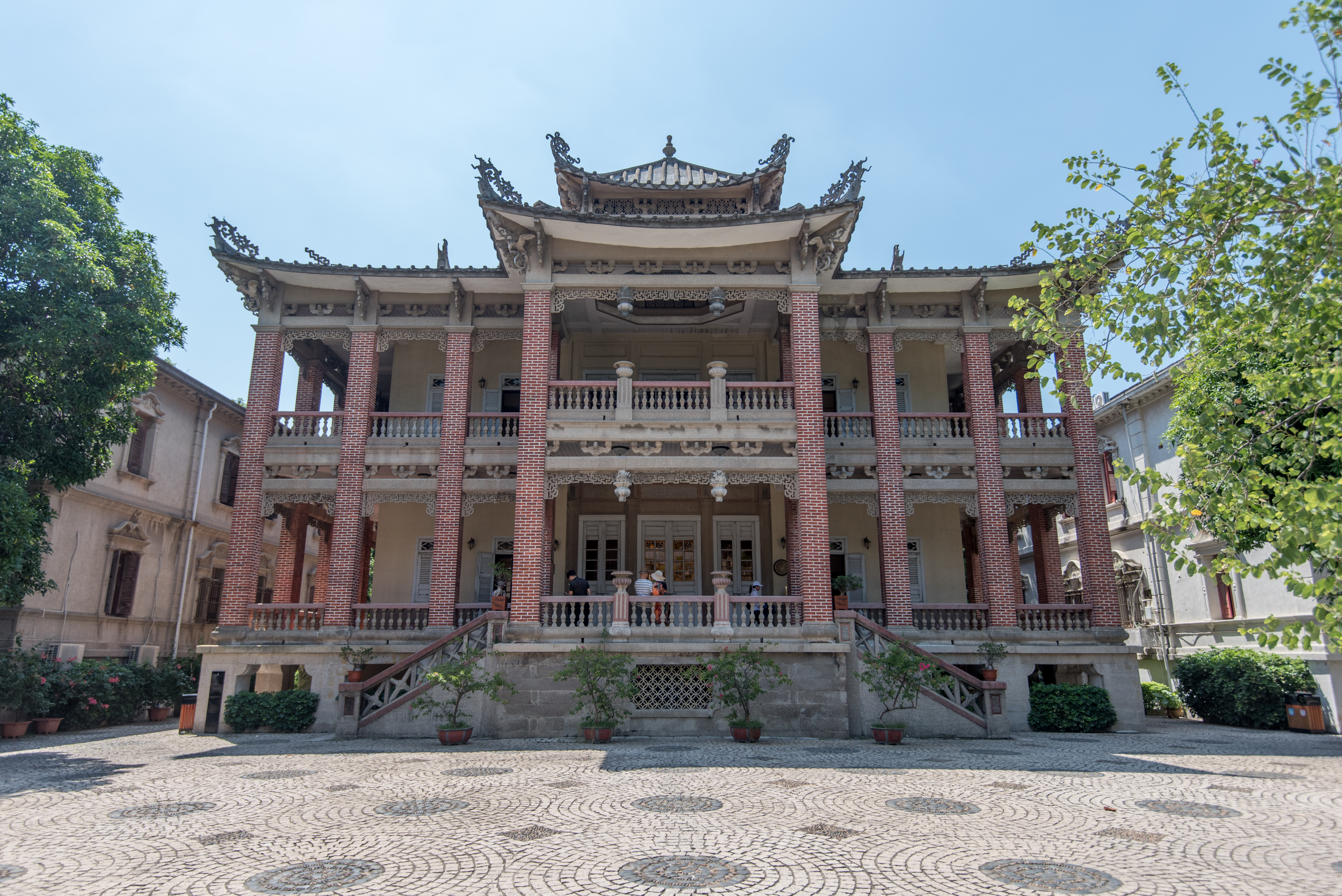
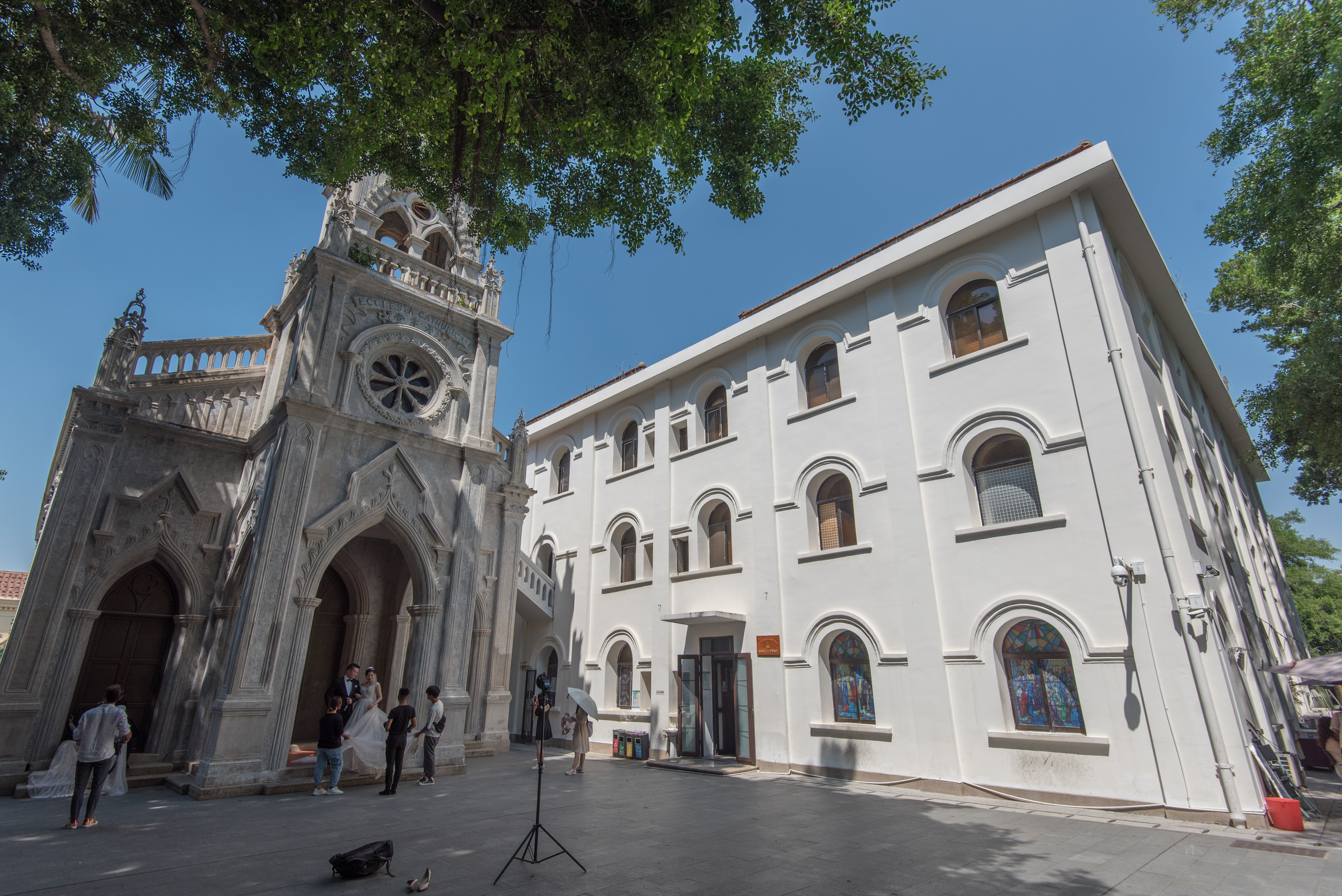
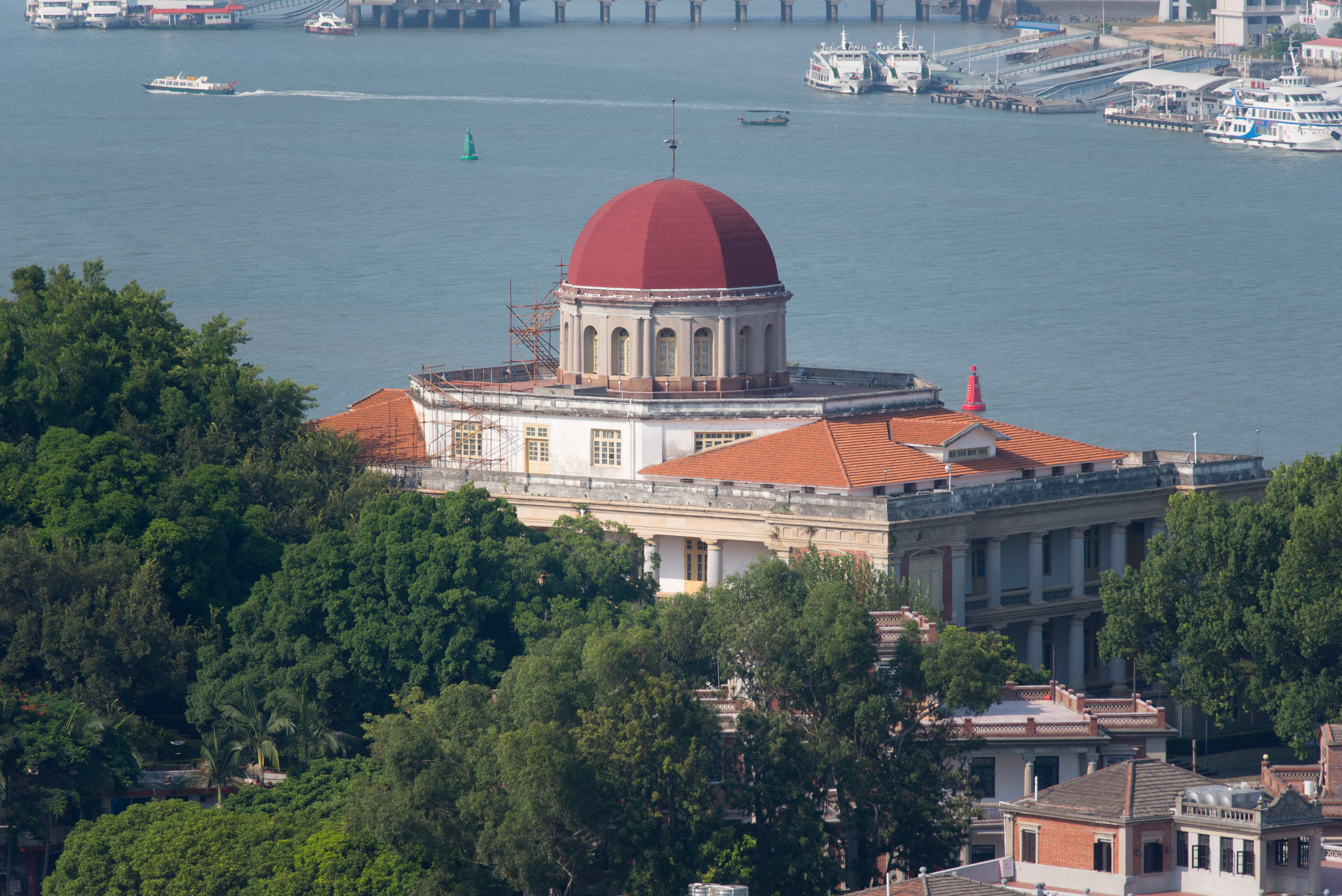
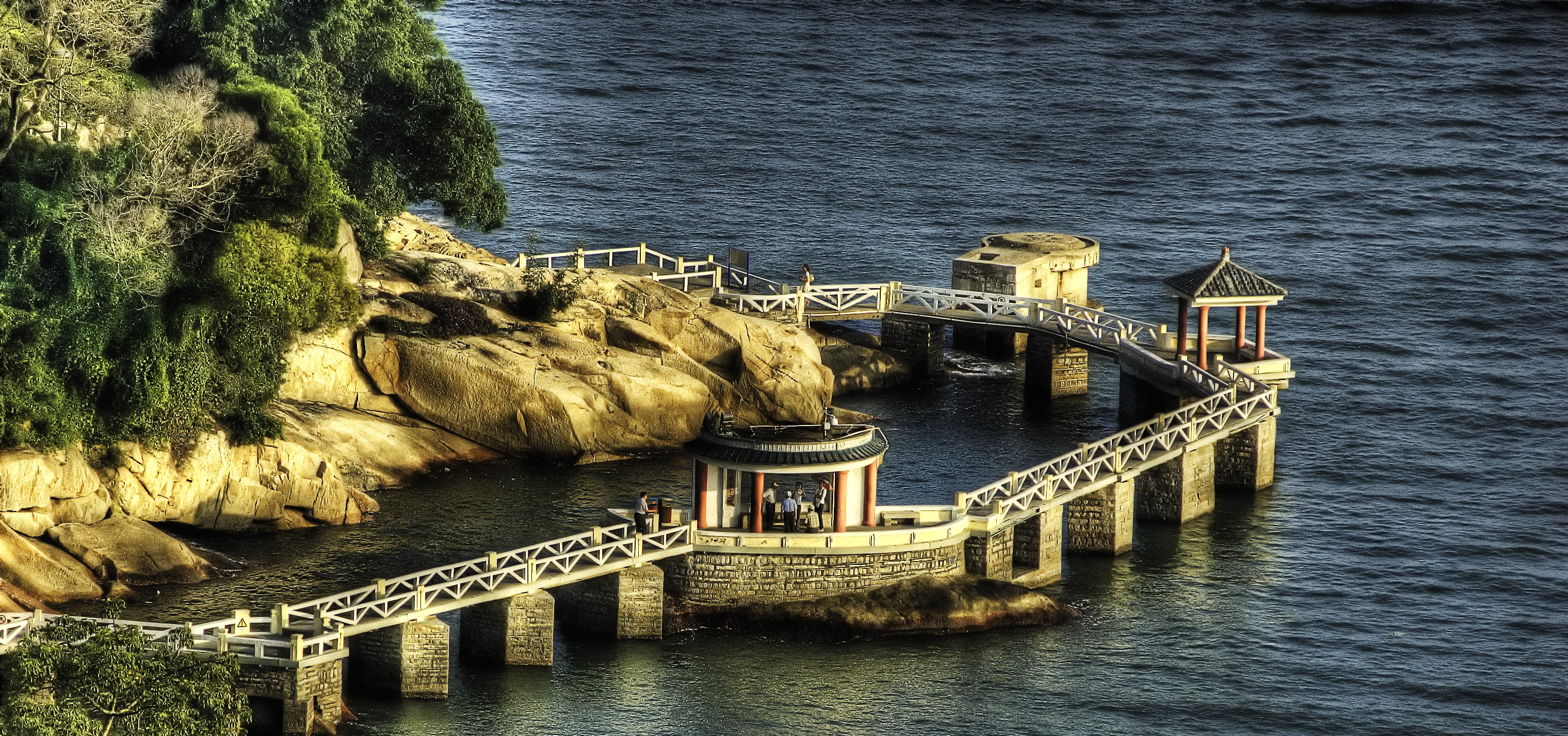
- View of Gulangyu and downtown Siming Sunlight Rock Hai Tian Tang Gou Mansion Church of Christ the King Bagua Mansion Shuzhuang Garden

- Location within Fujian Location within China
- Location: Xiamen, Fujian, China
- Criteria: Cultural: ii, iv
- Reference: 1541
- Inscription: 2017 (41st Session)
- Area: 316.2 hectares (3.162 km^{2})
- Buffer zone: 886 ha (2,190 acres)
- Coordinates: 24°26′51″N 118°03′43″E

Chinese name
- Simplified Chinese: 鼓浪屿
- Traditional Chinese: 鼓浪嶼
- Hokkien POJ: Kó͘-lōng-sū
- Postal: Kulangsu
- Literal meaning: Drum Wave Islet
Transcriptions
Standard Mandarin
- Hanyu Pinyin: gǔlàngyǔ
Wu
- Romanization: ku^{2} laon^{3} yu^{2}
Yue: Cantonese
- Jyutping: gu^{2} long^{6} zeoi^{6}
Southern Min
- Hokkien POJ: Kó͘-lōng-sū

Gulangyu Subdistrict 鼓浪屿街道
- Subdistrict
- Interactive map of Gulangyu Subdistrict
- Coordinates: 24°26′51″N 118°3′45″E
- Country: People's Republic of China
- Province: Fujian
- Prefecture: Xiamen
- District: Siming

Population
  - Total: 15,373
- Time zone: UTC+8 (China Standard)
- Area code: 0592
- Website: www.glyjd.gov.cn

Gulangyu, Gulang or Kulangsu is an island off the coast of Xiamen, Fujian, southeastern China. A UNESCO World Cultural Heritage Site, the island is one of China's most visited tourist attractions, attracting more than 10 million visitors per year.

Gulangyu covers an area of 1.88 km^{2} (0.73 sq mi), with a population of 12,509 as of 2023. Administratively, the island constitutes the Gulangyu Subdistrict, part of Xiamen's Siming District. It is reachable by ferry from downtown Xiamen.

Gulangyu Island is renowned for its beaches, winding lanes and rich architecture. The island is on China's list of National Scenic Spots and is classified as a 5A tourist attraction by the China National Tourism Administration (CNTA). It ranks at the top of the list of the ten most scenic areas in the province. As a pedestrian-only zone where cars and bicycles are banned, the only vehicles permitted are small electric buggies and electric government service vehicles.

== History ==
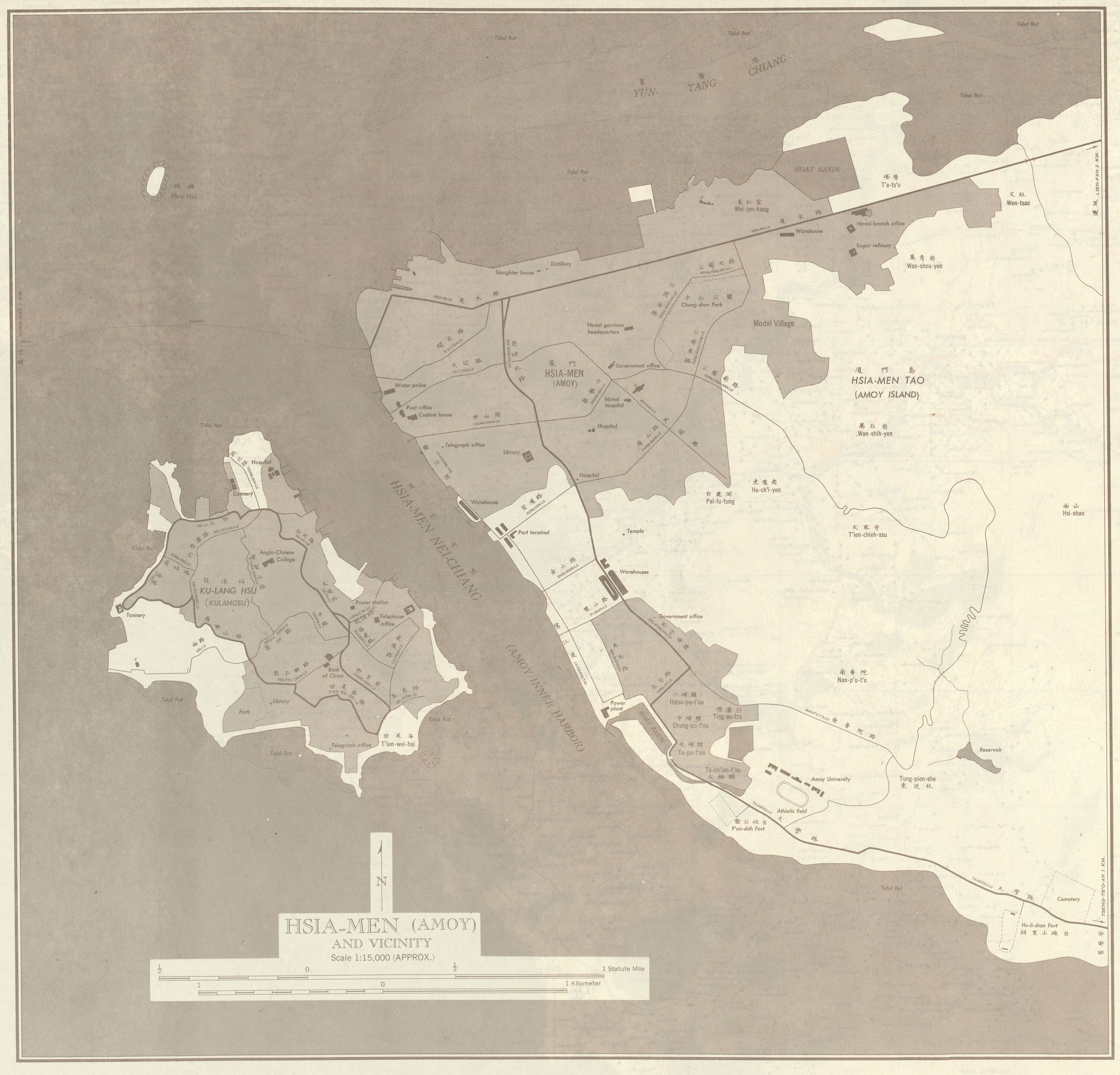
Map including Gulangyu (labeled as KU-LANG HSÜ (KULANGSU) 鼓浪屿)

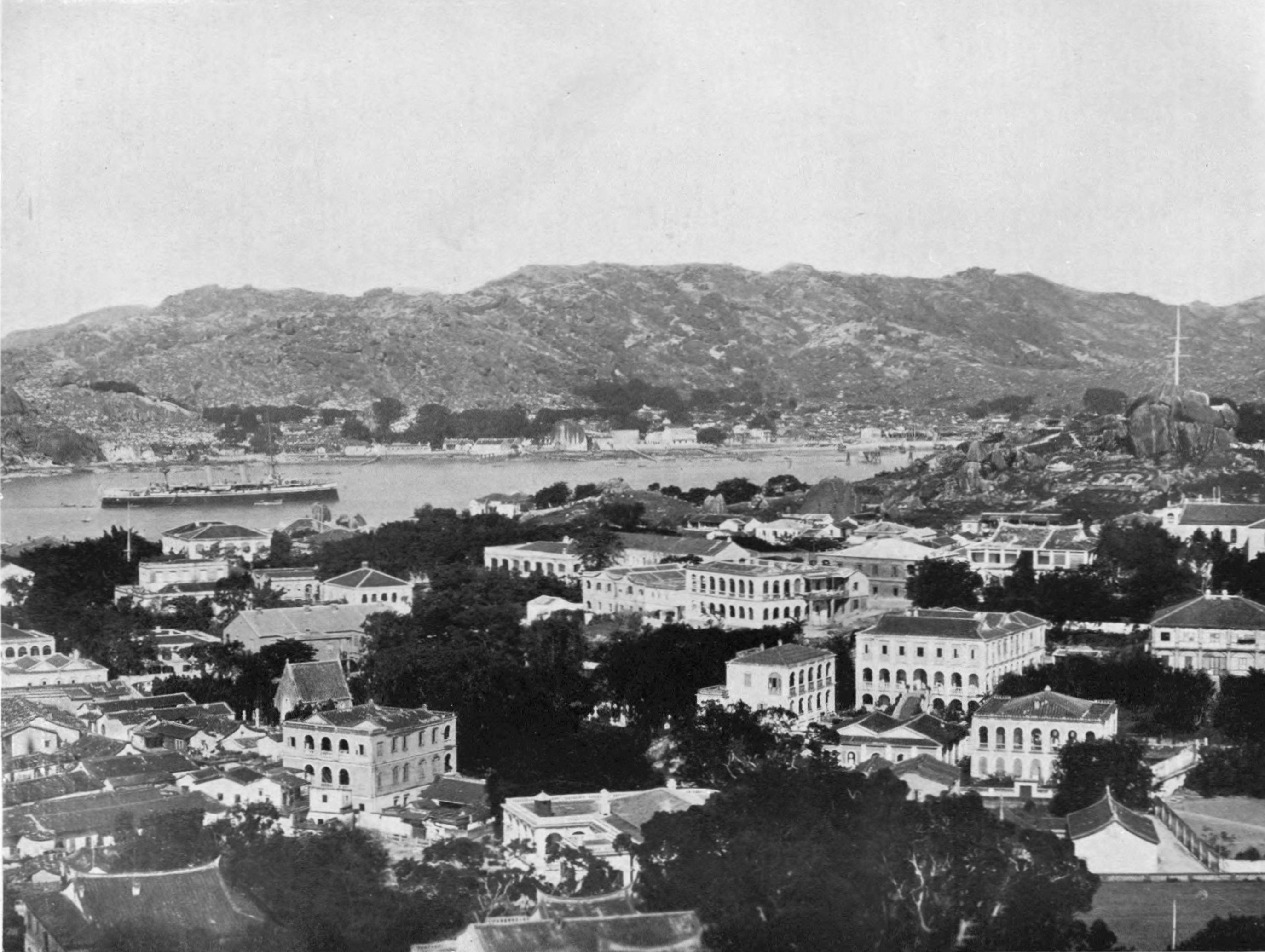
View of the International Settlement c. 1908

=== The International Settlement ===
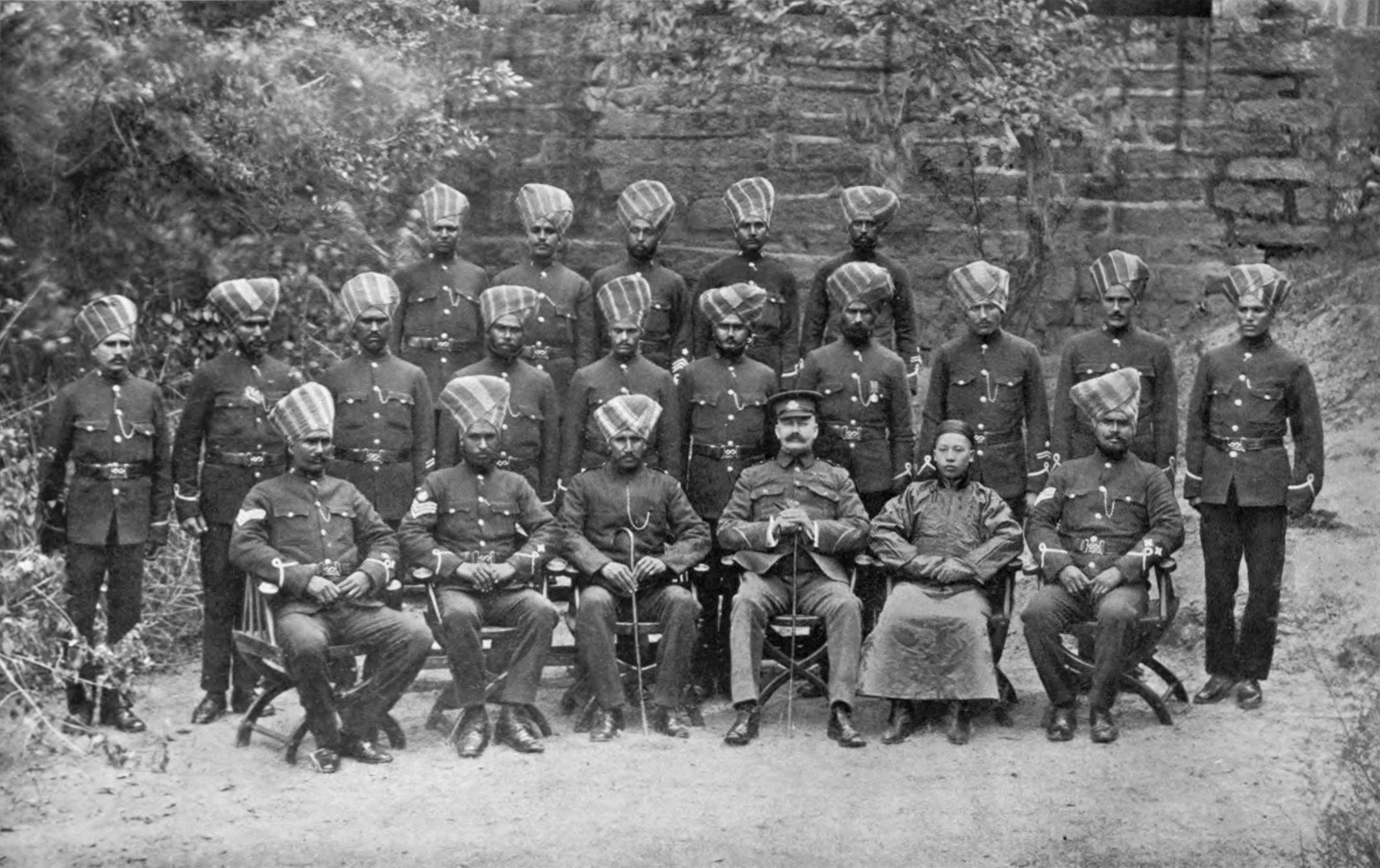
The Sikh police force

For a time, Gulangyu was the only international settlement on Chinese soil apart from the International Settlement at Shanghai.

Soon after Xiamen became a treaty port resulting from China's loss in the First Opium War and the Treaty of Nanking in 1842, foreign residents on the island established an informal organization that became formally organized several decades later when its Land Regulations were approved by the government of China (Qing dynasty) in May 1902. Eventually 13 countries, including Great Britain, France, the Netherlands and Japan, were to have extraterritorial privileges there and take part in the Kulangsu Municipal Council that administered the settlement. As with the Shanghai International Settlement, the British played a predominant role in the administration and Sikh policemen from British India were charged with the policing of the Settlement under the Kulangsu Municipal Police. The consulates, churches, hospitals, schools, police stations, etc. built by those foreign communities explain the predominantly Victorian-era style architecture that can still be seen throughout Gulangyu. Japanese occupation of the island began in 1942, and lasted until the end of World War II, when it was returned to China. The Hokkien dialect is spoken on the island, as it is in Xiamen.

=== People's Republic of China ===
After the establishment of the PRC, Gulangyu was a district of Xiamen, one of four in the municipality not located on Xiamen Island until 2003. In May of that year Gulangyu District was absorbed into Siming District, and has since been administered, policed, and adjudicated from Xiamen Island, just across the Lujiang River.

== Attractions ==
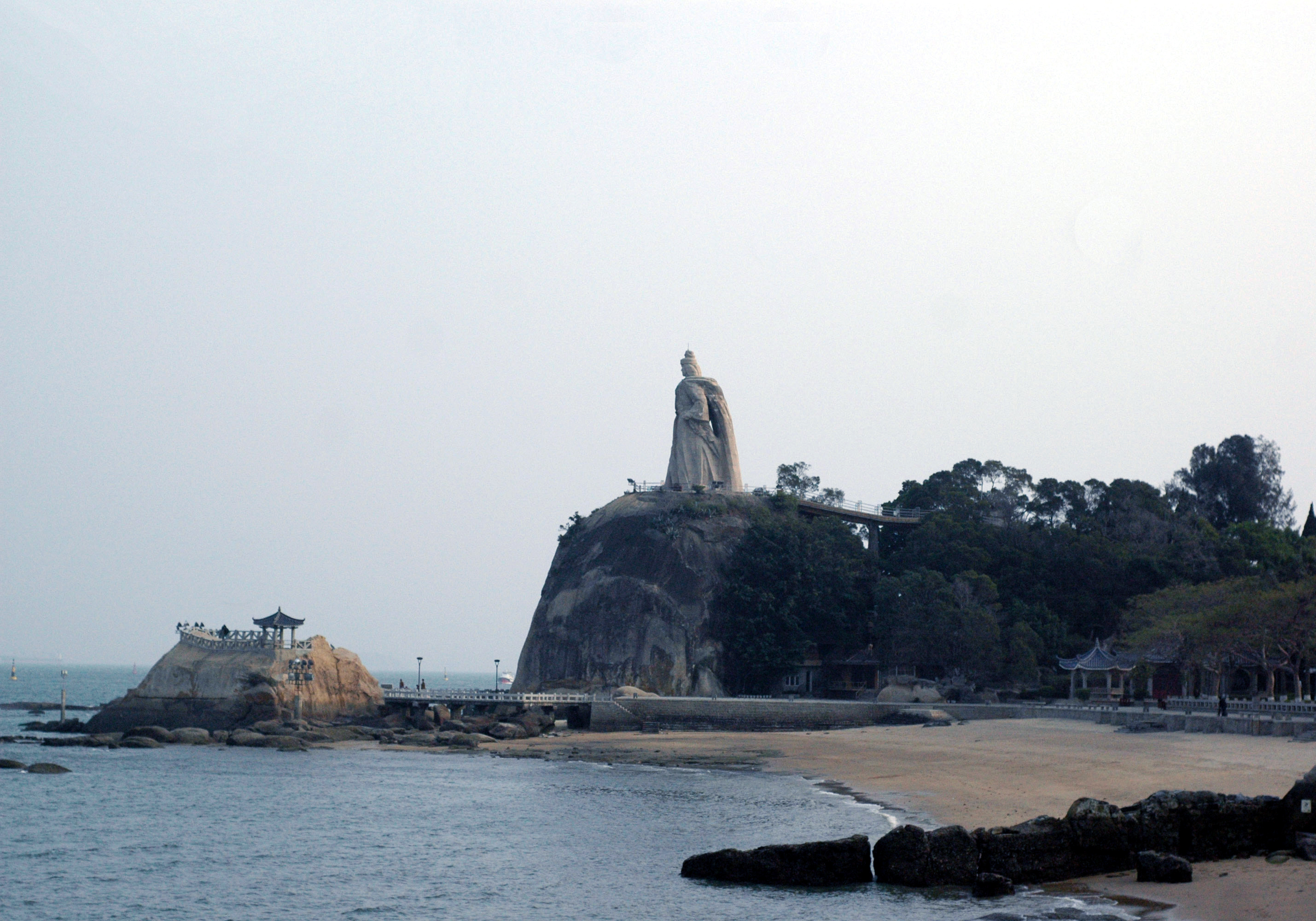
Gulangyu Island Statue of Koxinga facing Xiamen

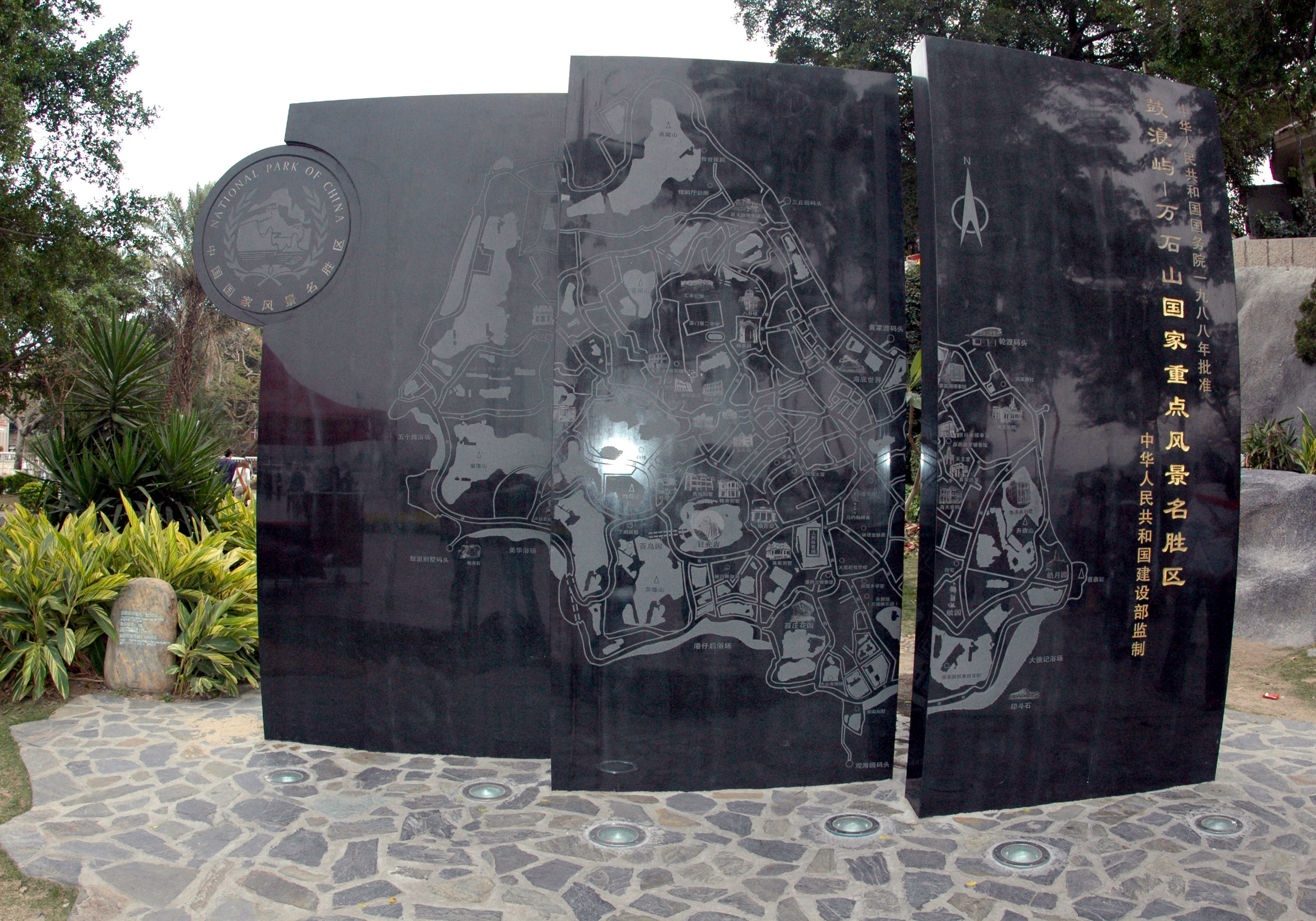
Gulangyu Island Walking Map

As a place of residence for Westerners during Xiamen's colonial past, Gulangyu is famous for its architecture and for hosting China's only piano museum, giving it the nickname of "Piano Island" or "The Town of Pianos" (钢琴之乡) or "The Island of Music" (音乐之岛). There are over 200 pianos on this island.

The Chinese name also has musical roots, as 鼓浪 Kó͘-lōng which means drum waves so-called because of the sound generated by the ocean waves hitting the reefs. 嶼 sū means "islet".

In addition, there is a museum dedicated to Koxinga, Hái-toé Sè-kài (海底世界) Marine World, a subtropical garden containing plants introduced by overseas Chinese, as well as Xiamen Museum, formerly the Eight Trigrams Tower (八卦楼).

The island of Gulangyu is a pedestrian-only destination, where the only vehicles on the islands are several fire trucks and electric tourist buggies. The narrow streets on the island, together with the architecture of various styles around the world, give the island a unique appearance. The site is classified as a AAAAA scenic area by the China National Tourism Administration.

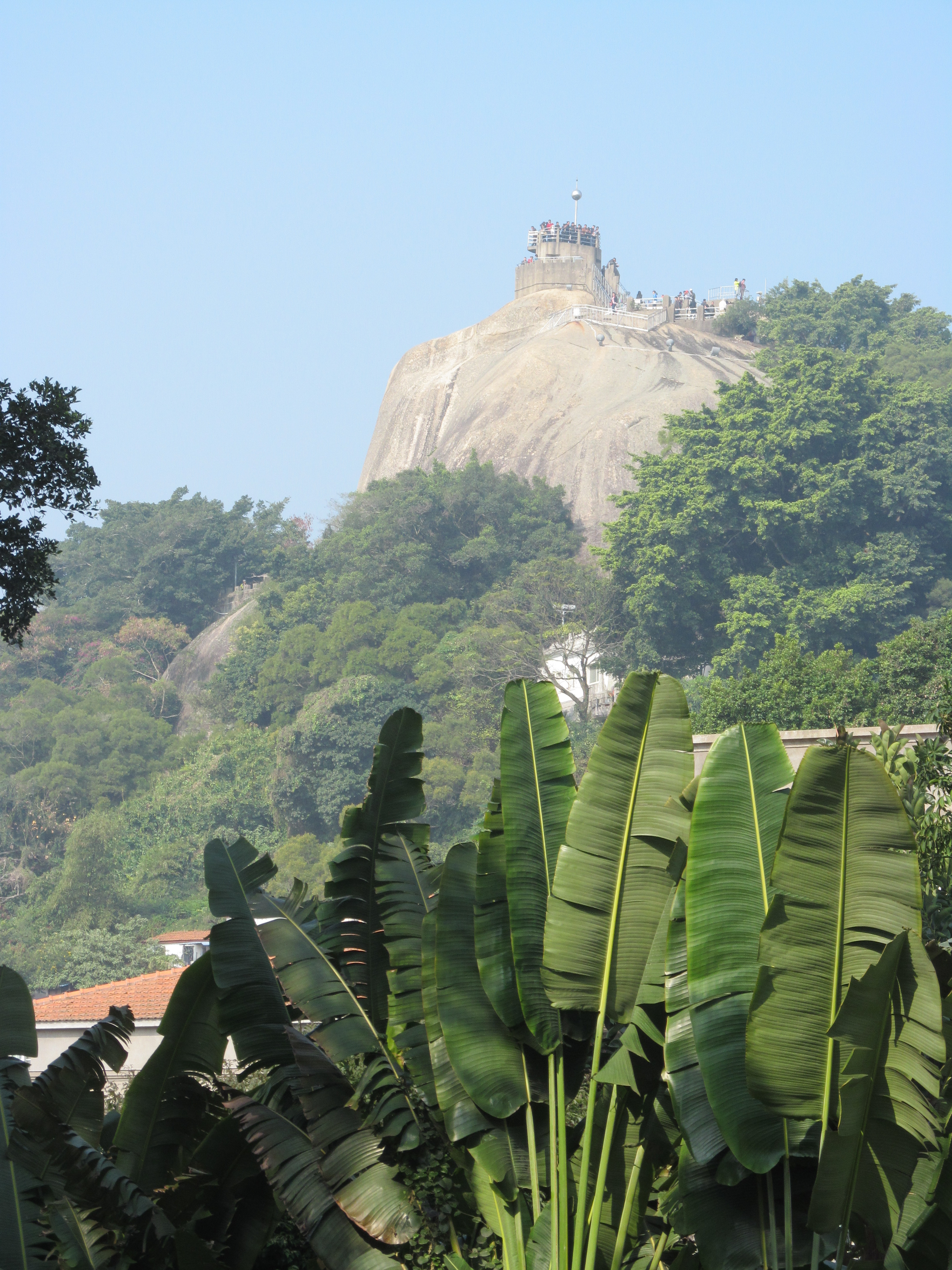
Mount Lit-kong-giam (日光岩 Sunlight Rock) is the highest place on Gulangyu

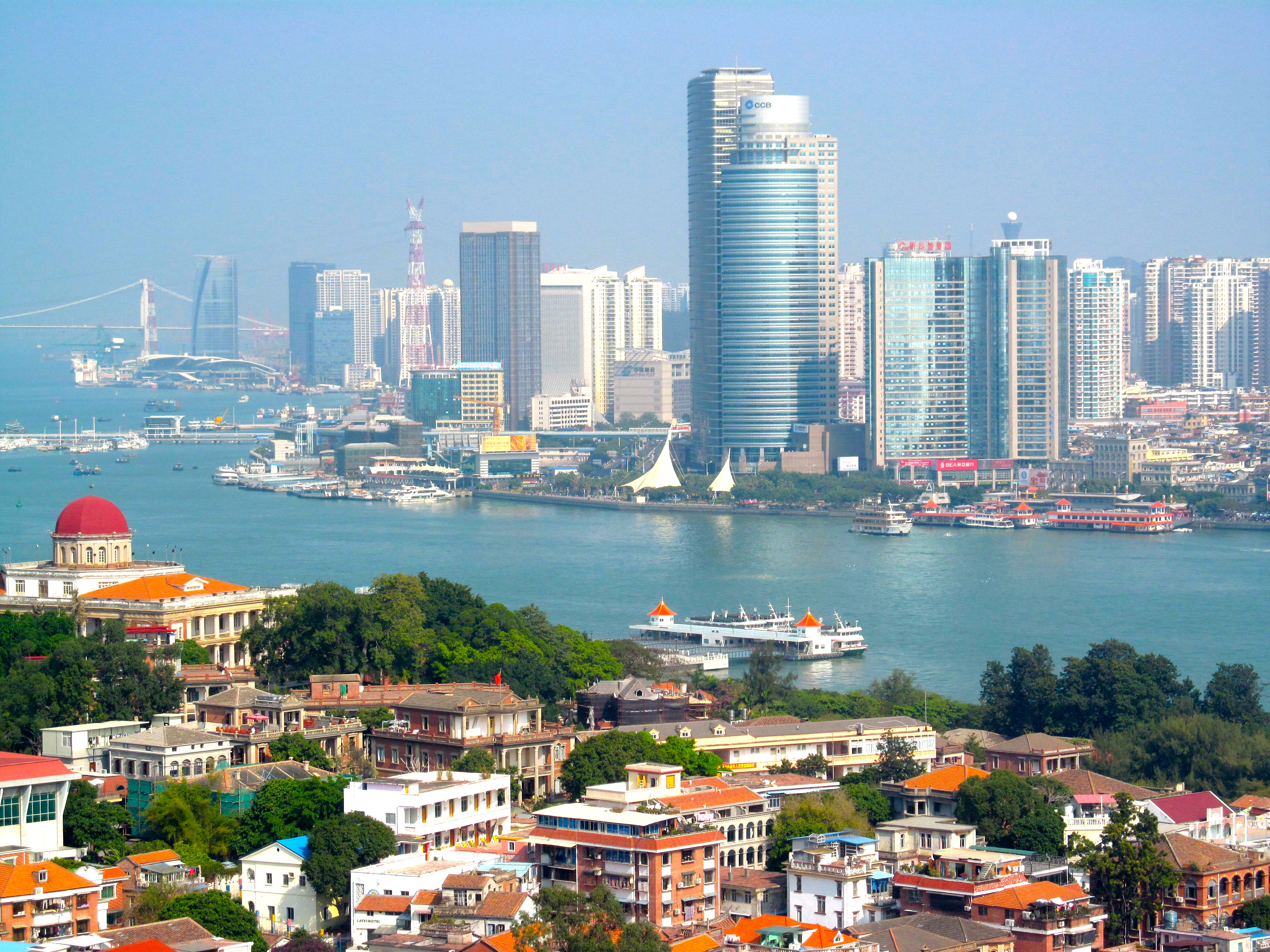
View of urban area, Xiamen from Mount Lit-kong-giam

Buildings and sights of the former international settlements includes:

- United States Consulate Building by architect Elliott Hazzard
- Kulangsu Catholic Church (Tian Zhu Tang) c. 1917
- Former Office of Great Northern Telegraph Company (Denmark) (Dan Mai Da Bei Dian Bao Gong Si) c. 1871
- Kulangsu Organ Museum (Eight Diagrams Mansion / Bagua Mansion) c. 1907 - designed by John Abraham Otte
- Foreigners' Football Field (Ren Min Ti Yu Chang) c. 1878
- Former Kulangsu Mixed Court (Hui Shen Gong Tang) c. 1915
- Union Church (Xie He Li Bai Tang) c. 1911
- Christian Cemetery (Fan Zai Mu Yuan)

== Transportation ==
Gulangyu is unique in China as a "traffic-free island". It is connected to the main island of Xiamen by ferry. Neither cars nor bicycles are allowed, unlike Xiamen Island across the river. Recently, electric tourist buggies were introduced. Freight is pulled on wheeled wooden carts up the often steep lanes by strong teams of men.

== Culture ==
The spread of Christianity in the 1900s brought western music to the island. Churches and museums were built, and people enjoyed going to music halls to hear performances. Since then, the island's local cultural environment mingled with introduced foreign music and art, which is why the Gulangyu cultural scene differs from other parts of China.

== Classical music ==
A number of China's most famous classical musicians come from Gulangyu, including the pianist Yin Chengzong, the violist Jing Yang, and the pianist Xu Feiping. Historically, Shu'an Zhou, Junji Lin, and Zuohuang Chen are other well-known classical musicians from the island. Gulangyu's piano ownership per capita ranks the first in nation, and by 2002, Gulangyu Island was given the name of "The Island of Music" by Chinese Musicians' Association. The piano exhibition halls and museums and overall artistic atmosphere attract many musicians domestically and internationally. The 580-seat Gulangyu Concert Hall is one of Fujian Province's most notable acoustic classical music venues.

== Awards ==
In 2005, Gulangyu Island was named the most beautiful district of China by Chinese National Geography magazine.

In May 2007, Xiamen Gulangyu Island was officially accredited as the National 5A Tourist Attractions by the National Tourism Administration of China.

On 8 July 2017, Gulangyu was listed as a UNESCO World Heritage Site.

== See also ==
- List of car-free places
- List of World Heritage Sites in China
- List of islands of China

== Gallery ==
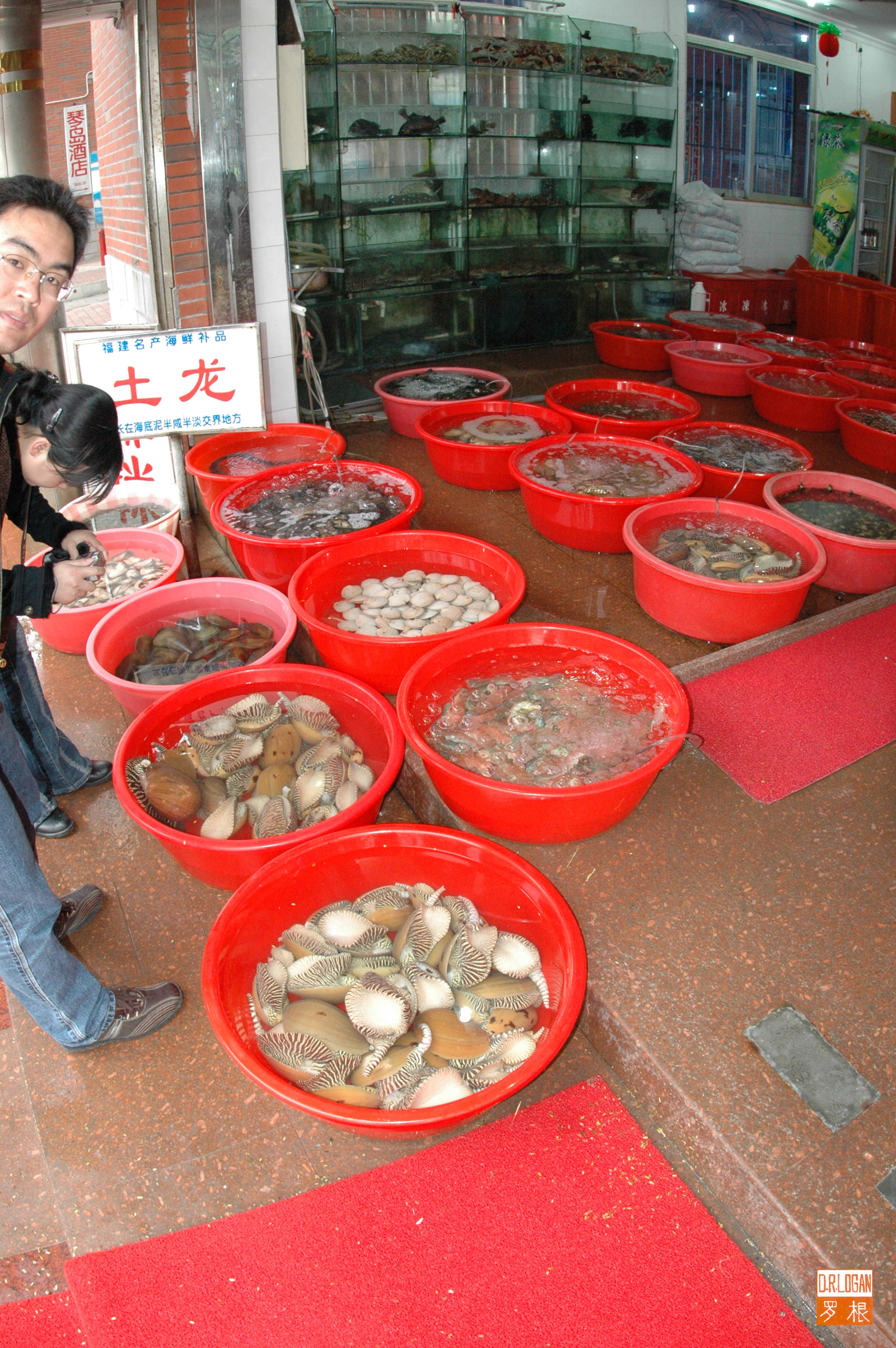
Gulangyu Island fish and seafood restaurant street vendor

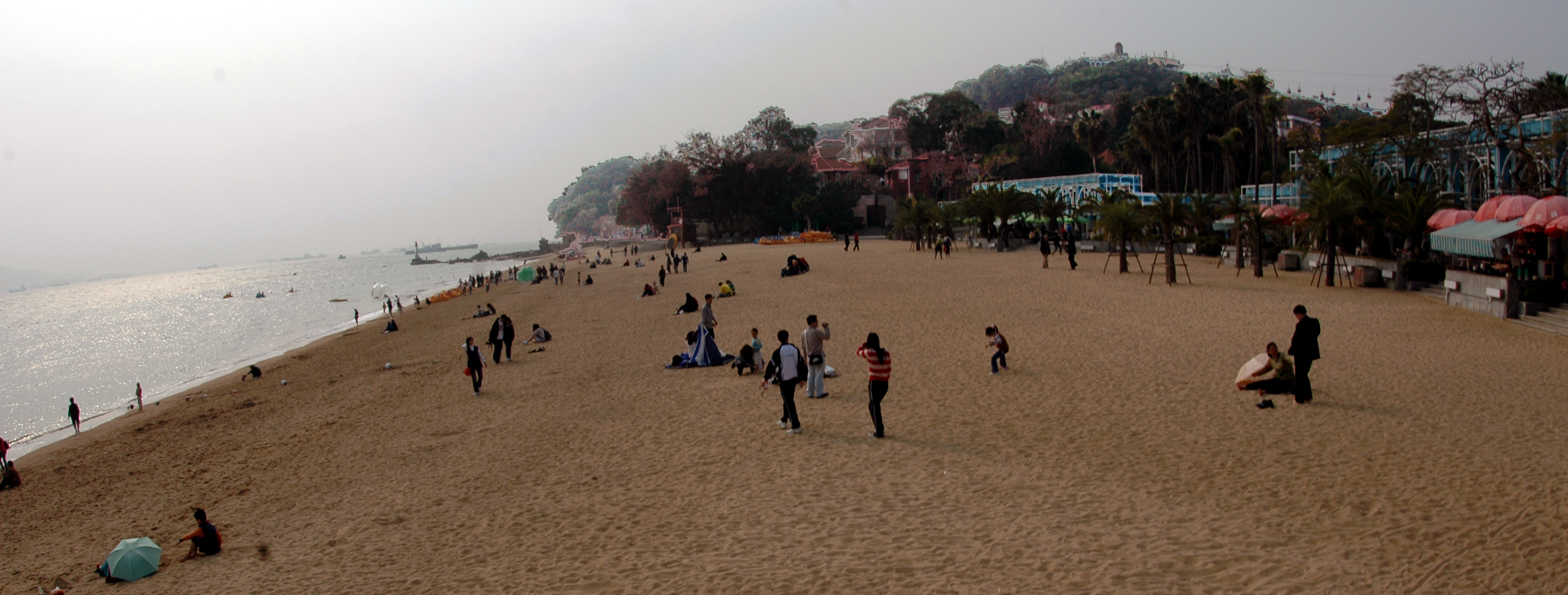
Beach on Gulangyu

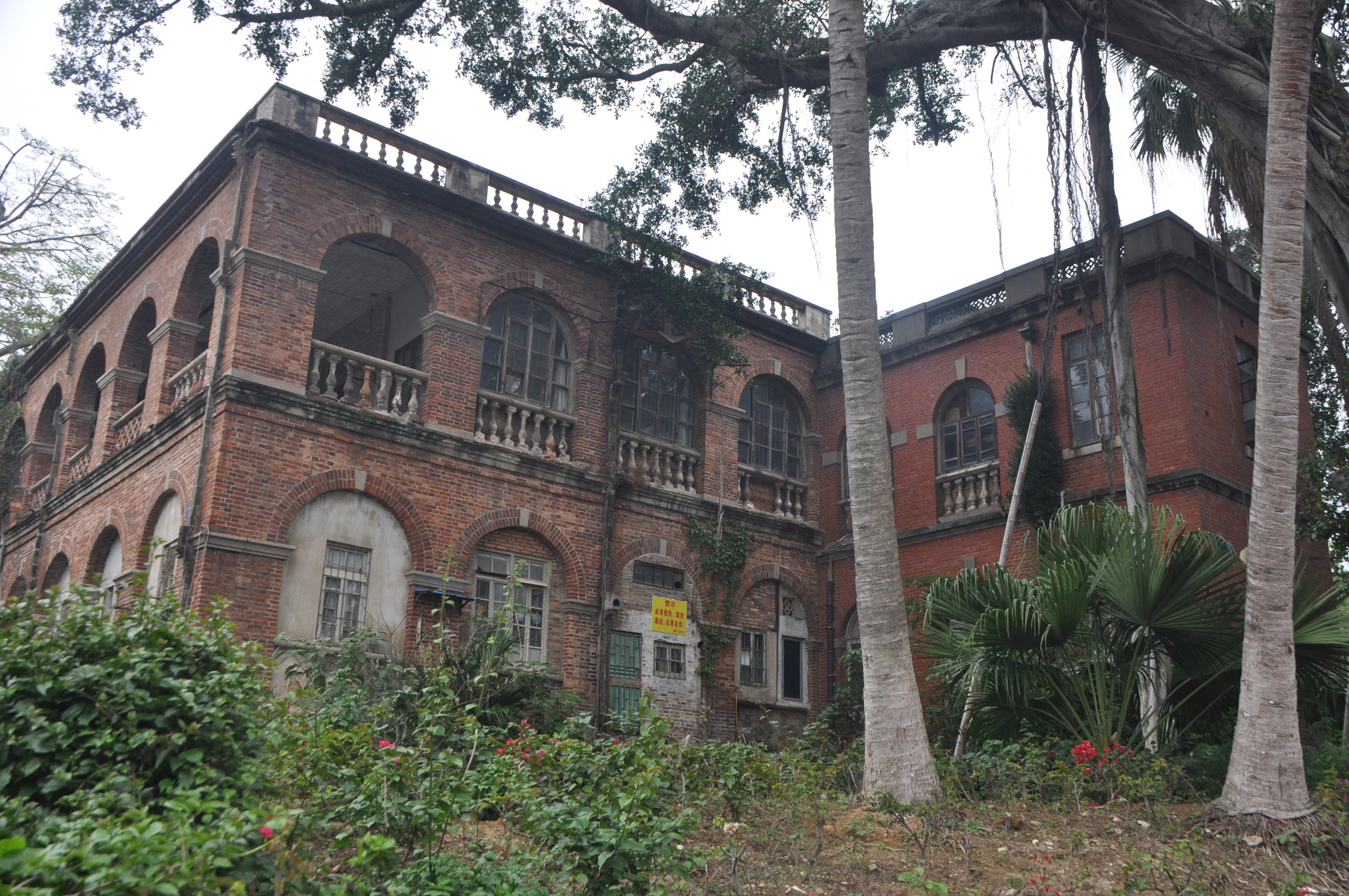
Former Japanese consulate of Gulangyu

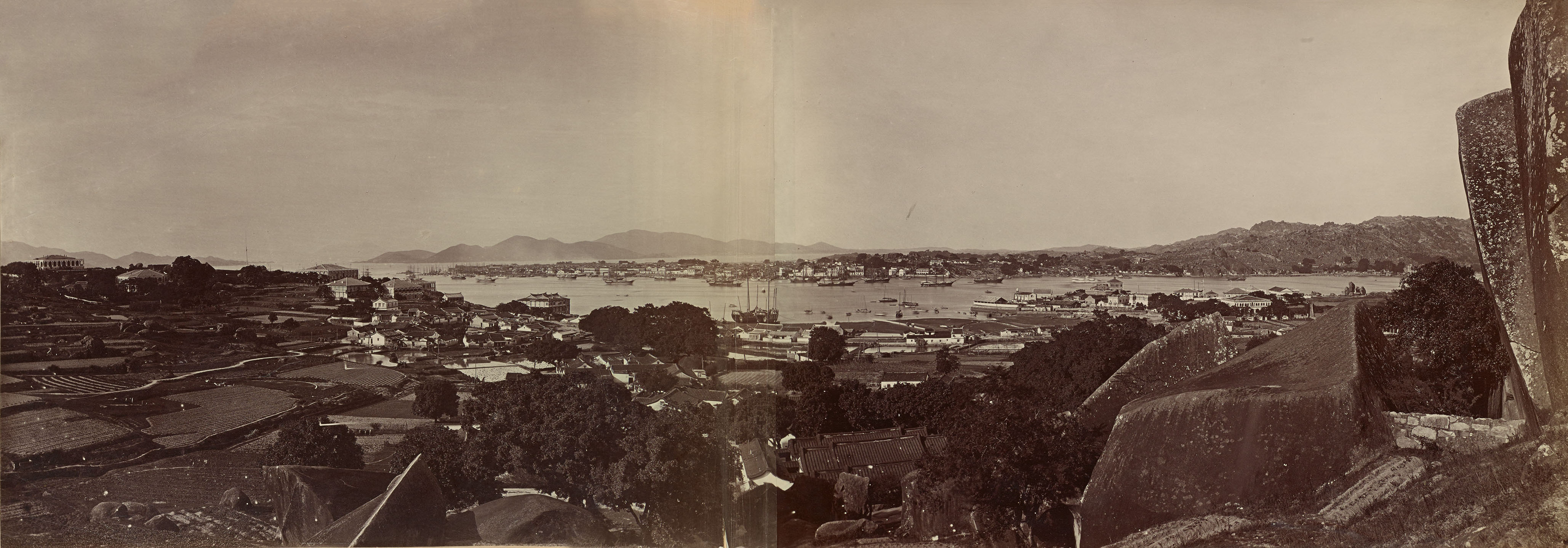
Panorama by Lai Afong c1870

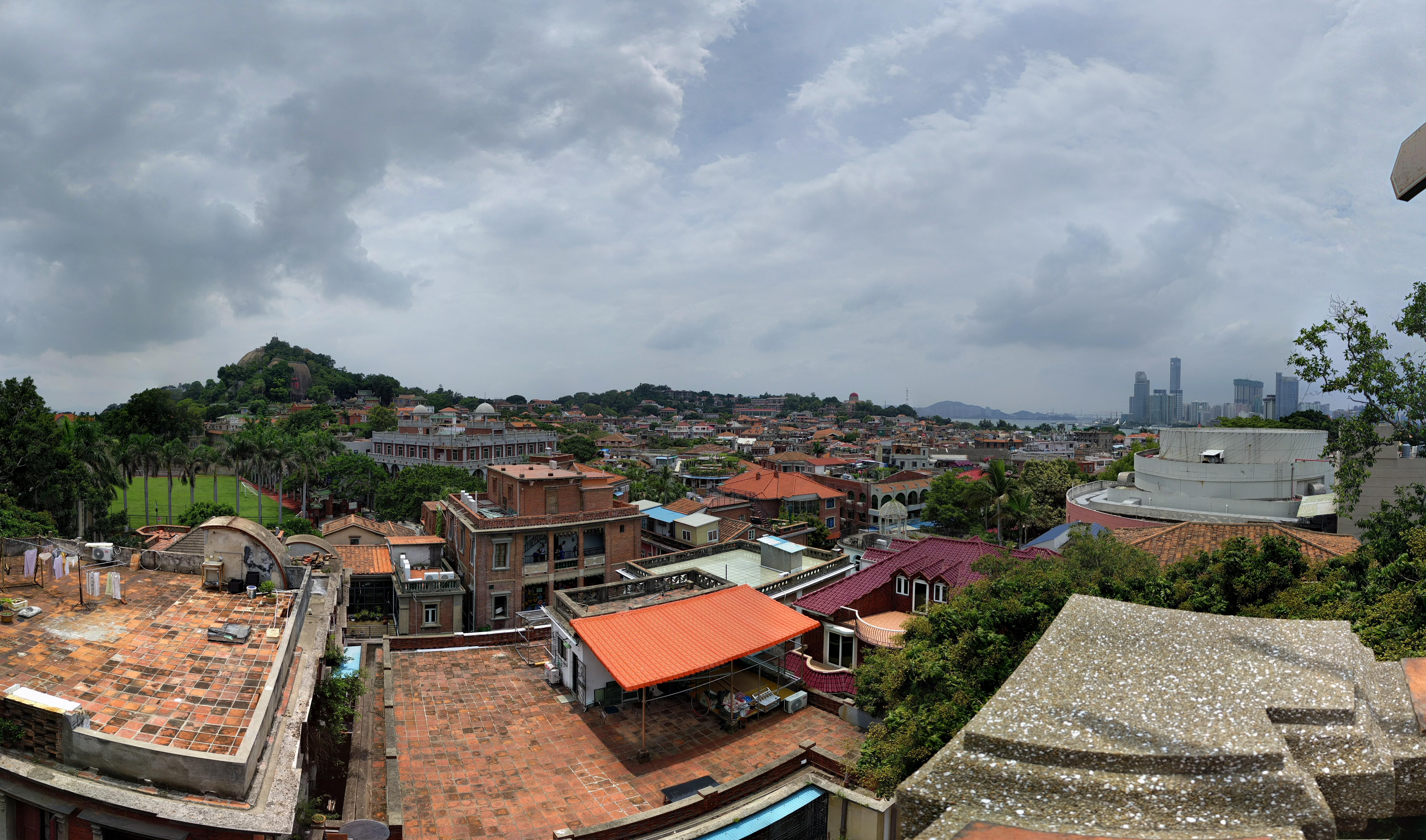
Panorama in 2018.6
