= HMS Black Prince (1816) =

Royal Navy third rate ship of the line

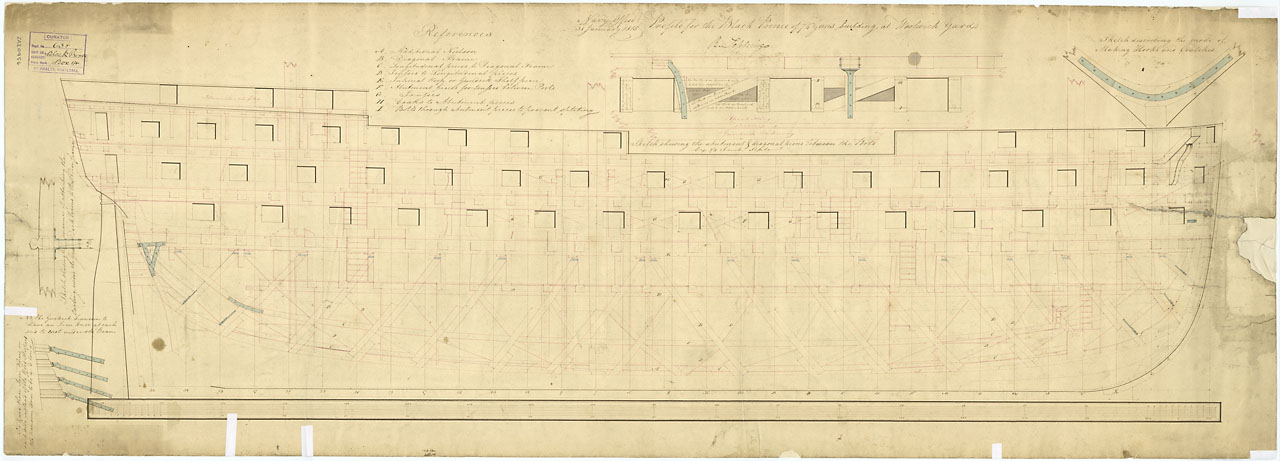
- Black Prince, a plan dated 1815

History

United Kingdom
- Name: HMS Black Prince
- Ordered: 14 August 1810
- Builder: Woolwich Dockyard
- Laid down: July 1814
- Launched: 30 March 1816
- Fate: Broken up, 1855

General characteristics
- Class & type: Black Prince-class ship of the line
- Tons burthen: 1751 bm
- Length: 176 ft 1 in (53.67 m) (gundeck); 144 ft 10.375 in (44.15473 m) (keel)
- Beam: 47 ft 8 in (14.53 m)
- Depth of hold: 21 ft (6.4 m)
- Propulsion: Sails
- Sail plan: Full-rigged ship
- Armament: 74 guns: Gundeck: 28 × 32-pounders; Upper gundeck: 28 × 18-pounders; Quarterdeck: 4 × 12-pounders, 10 × 32-pounder carronades; Forecastle: 2 × 12-pounders, 2 × 32-pounder carronades; Poop deck: 6 × 18-pounder carronades

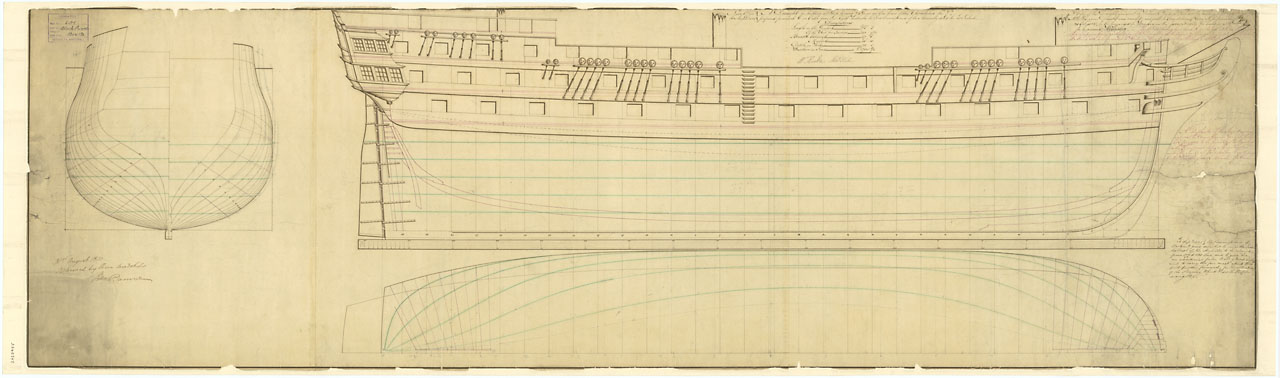
A Black Prince plan dated 1810, based on the design of the captured (1807) Danish 74-gun Christian VII.

HMS Black Prince was a 74-gun third rate ship of the line of the Black Prince class of the Royal Navy, launched on 30 March 1816 at Woolwich Dockyard.

In 1848, Black Prince became a prison ship at Chatham, and she was broken up in 1855.
