= Mount Black Prince (Alberta) =

Mountain in Alberta, Canada

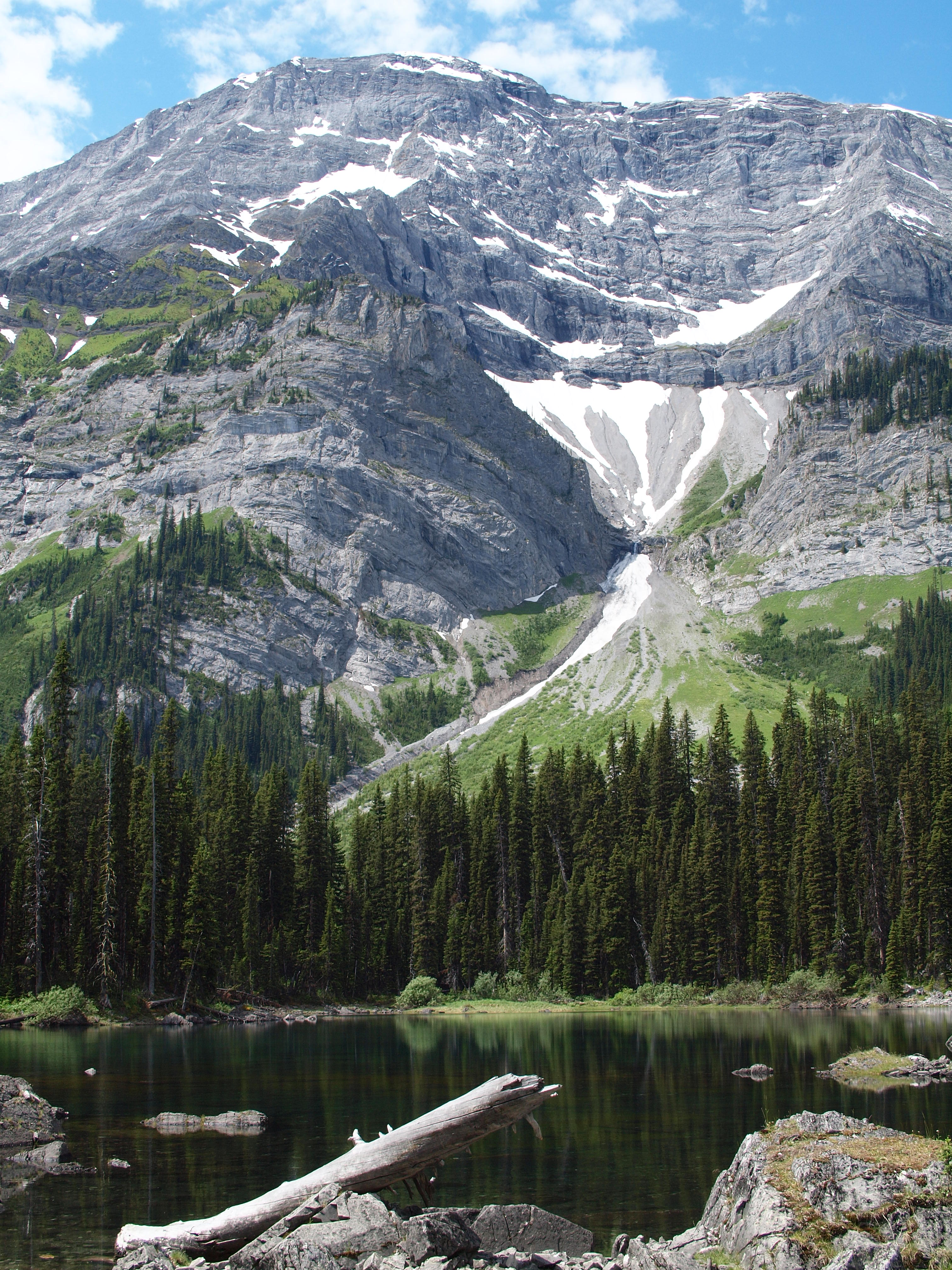

Highest point
- Elevation: 2,939 m (9,642 ft)
- Prominence: 239 m (784 ft)
- Parent peak: Mount Smith-Dorrien (3151 m)
- Listing: Mountains of Alberta
- Coordinates: 50°41′43″N 115°14′41″W

Geography
- Location within Alberta Location within Canada
- Interactive map of Mount Black Prince
- Country: Canada
- Province: Alberta
- Parent range: Spray Mountains; Canadian Rockies
- Topo map: NTS 82J11 Kananaskis Lakes

Geology
- Rock age: Cambrian
- Rock type: Sedimentary rock

Climbing
- First ascent: 1956 B. Fraser, M. Hicks, J. Gorril
- Easiest route: Scramble

Mount Black Prince is a 2,939-metre (9,642-foot) mountain summit located in Peter Lougheed Provincial Park in the Canadian Rockies of Alberta, Canada. Its nearest higher peak is Mount Smith Dorrien, 5.8 km (3.6 mi) to the northwest. The mountain can be seen from Highway 742, also known as Smith-Dorrien/Spray Trail.

Like so many of the mountains in Kananaskis Country, Mount Black Prince received its name from the persons and ships involved in the 1916 Battle of Jutland, the only major sea battle of the First World War.

== History ==
Mount Black Prince was named in 1917 for HMS Black Prince, a Royal Navy cruiser that sank during the Battle of Jutland in World War I.

The mountain's toponym was officially adopted in 1922 by the Geographical Names Board of Canada.

The first ascent of the peak was made in 1956 by B. Fraser, M. Hicks, and J. Gorril.

== Geology ==
Mount Black Prince is composed of sedimentary rock laid down during the Precambrian to Jurassic periods. Formed in shallow seas, this sedimentary rock was pushed east and over the top of younger rock during the Laramide orogeny.

== Climate ==
Based on the Köppen climate classification, Mount Black Prince is located in a subarctic climate with cold, snowy winters, and mild summers. Temperatures can drop below −20 °C (−4 °F) with wind chill factors below −30 °C (−22 °F). In terms of favorable weather, July through September are the best months to climb. Precipitation runoff from the mountain drains into tributaries of the Kananaskis River, thence into the Bow River.

== Gallery ==
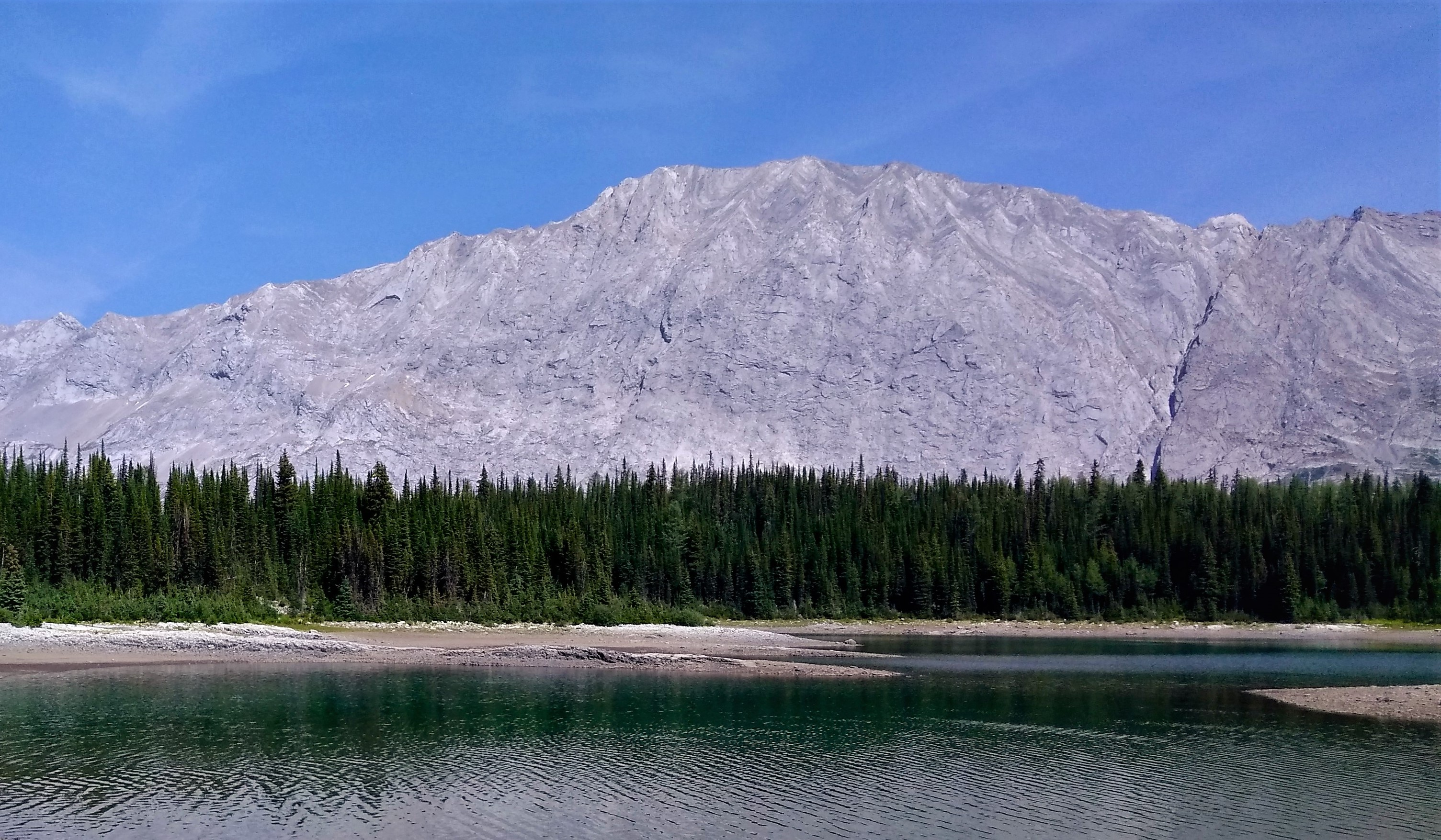
Mount Black Prince viewed from Lawson Lake

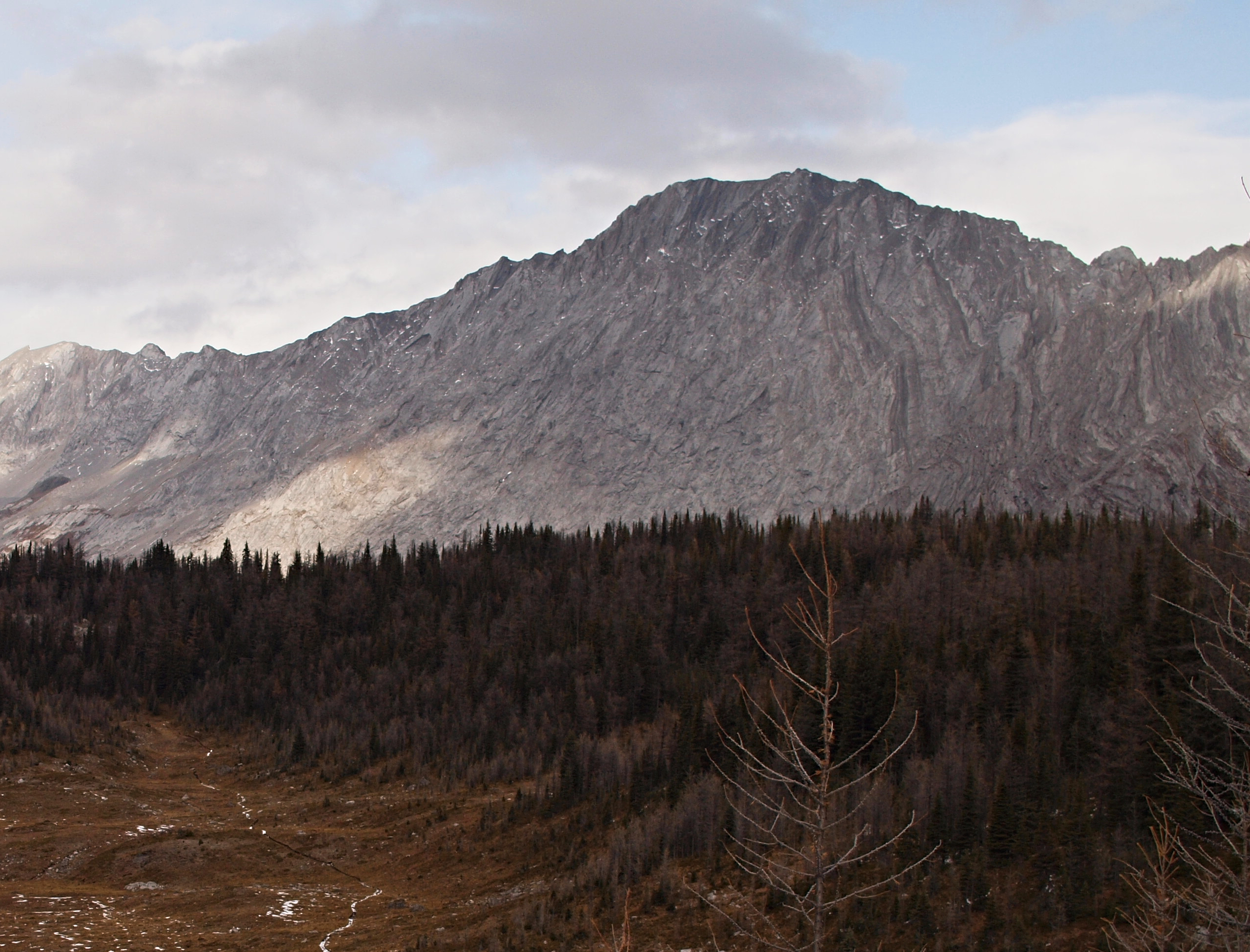
Mount Black Prince seen from Turbine Canyon

== See also ==
- List of mountains in the Canadian Rockies
- Geography of Alberta
- Black Prince Mountain
