= Maksakov =

Maksakov (Russian: Макса′ков), or Maksakova (feminine; Макса′кова), is a Russian surname and may refer to:

- Ivan Maksakov (born 1983), one of the three men behind a series of DDoS attacks
- Lyudmila Maksakova (born 1940), Soviet/Russian theater and film actress, daughter of Maria Maksakova Sr.
- Maria Maksakova Jr. (born 1977), Russian and Ukrainian opera singer, daughter of Lyudmila Maksakova
- Maria Maksakova Sr. (1902–1974), Russian and Soviet opera singer
- Maximilian Maksakov (1869–1936), Austrian and Russian opera singer
