= Red Queen =

Red Queen may refer to:

== Literature ==
- Red Queen (Through the Looking-Glass), a character in Lewis Carroll's Through the Looking-Glass (1871)
- "The Red Queen's Race", a 1949 short story by Isaac Asimov
- The Red Queen: Sex and the Evolution of Human Nature, a popular 1993 science book by Matt Ridley
- The Red Queen (Drabble novel), a 2004 novel by Margaret Drabble
- Queen Redd, the main antagonist of Frank Beddor's 2004 The Looking-Glass Wars series, based on the above Lewis Carroll character
- The Red Queen (Gregory novel), a 2010 historical novel by Philippa Gregory
- The Red Queen (Obernewtyn Chronicles), a 2012 novel by Isobelle Carmody
- Red Queen (novel), a 2015 novel by Victoria Aveyard

== Entertainment ==
- Red Queen (comics), a number of characters appearing in Marvel Comics
- Red Queen to Gryphon Three, a 1974 concept album by the band Gryphon based on the game of chess
- Blood Red Queen, a character who appeared in the "Vengeance of Vampirella" storyline
- Red Queen, an artificial intelligence, a character in the 2002 Resident Evil films
- The sword wielded by Nero in the 2008 Devil May Cry series
- Sana Kashimura, otherwise called the Red Queen, a character in the 2012 manga and anime series Alice & Zouroku
- The Red Queen, an alias used by Martha Kent to disrupt the Checkmate organization on the television series Smallville
- "The Red Queen" (Cardiac Arrest), a 1996 television episode
- "Red Queen" (Gotham), a 2016 episode of the third season of Gotham
- Red Queen (TV series), a 2024 Spanish–Mexican thriller television series on Amazon Prime Video
- The Red Queen (miniseries), a 2015 Russian–Ukrainian television series

== Other ==
- A red Queen (playing card)
- Elisabeth of Bavaria, Queen of the Belgians, nicknamed "The Red Queen"
- Red Queen Hypothesis, an evolutionary hypothesis to the advantage of sex at the level of individuals, and the constant evolutionary arms race between competing species or species and parasite
- Red Queen (EP), a 2003 album by Funker Vogt
- The Red Queen's race, a parable in Alice in Wonderland that has served as the basis of a number of scientific and sociological theories
- The Tomb of the Red Queen, an unidentified Mayan noblewoman
- Red Queen (anti-aircraft gun), a British Army experimental anti-aircraft gun
- Red Queen (radar), an RAF night fighter detection system

== See also ==
- Red King (disambiguation)
