= Red (comics) =

Red, in comics, may refer to:

- Red (manga), a 2006 manga by Sanae Rokuya
- Red (WildStorm), a 2003/2004 three-issue comic book mini-series
- Red (1998), a manga by Kenichi Muraeda
- Red (2007), an award-winning manga by Naoki Yamamoto
- Red, a nickname given to Hellboy
- Red, a number of characters/concepts in DC Comics publications:
  - Red, a DC Comics supervillain and member of the Rainbow Raiders
  - Red, one of a trio of soldiers who were later reinvented in Kingdom Come, both times as the team Red, White and Blue
  - The Red, part of the Parliament Enclave in Swamp Things stories, the most famous member being The Green
    - The Red is most closely associated with the heroes Animal Man, Vixen, B'wana Beast, and Beast Boy
- Red, three Marvel Comics characters:
  - Red, a Golden Age gangster and enemy of the original Human Torch, who appeared in Marvel Comics #1
  - Red, a member of S.H.I.E.L.D., who is the most advanced Life Model Decoy
  - Red, a member of the Marauders in the Age of Apocalypse, who is an alternate version of the Green Goblin

== See also ==
- Red (disambiguation)
- Red Dragon (comics)
- Red King (comics)
- Red Queen (comics)
