= Mariya Petrovna Maksakova =

Mariya Petrovna Maksakova may refer to:

- Maria Maksakova Jr. (born 1977), Russian opera singer (mezzo-soprano), daughter of Lyudmila Maksakova
- Maria Maksakova Sr. (1902–1974), Russian/Soviet opera singer (mezzo-soprano)
