= Derivations of the Lorentz transformations =

There are many ways to derive the Lorentz transformations using a variety of physical principles, ranging from Maxwell's equations to Einstein's postulates of special relativity, and mathematical tools, spanning from elementary algebra and hyperbolic functions, to linear algebra and group theory.

This article provides a few of the easier ones to follow in the context of special relativity, for the simplest case of a Lorentz boost in standard configuration, i.e. two inertial frames moving relative to each other at constant (uniform) relative velocity less than the speed of light, and using Cartesian coordinates so that the x and x′ axes are collinear.

== Lorentz transformation ==
In the fundamental branches of modern physics, namely general relativity and its widely applicable subset special relativity, as well as relativistic quantum mechanics and relativistic quantum field theory, the Lorentz transformation is the transformation rule under which all four-vectors and tensors containing physical quantities transform from one frame of reference to another.

The prime examples of such four-vectors are the four-position and four-momentum of a particle, and for fields the electromagnetic tensor and stress–energy tensor. The fact that these objects transform according to the Lorentz transformation is what mathematically defines them as vectors and tensors; see tensor for a definition.

Given the components of the four-vectors or tensors in some frame, the "transformation rule" allows one to determine the altered components of the same four-vectors or tensors in another frame, which could be boosted or accelerated, relative to the original frame. A "boost" should not be conflated with spatial translation, rather it's characterized by the relative velocity between frames. The transformation rule itself depends on the relative motion of the frames. In the simplest case of two inertial frames the relative velocity between enters the transformation rule. For rotating reference frames or general non-inertial reference frames, more parameters are needed, including the relative velocity (magnitude and direction), the rotation axis and angle turned through.

== Historical background ==
The usual treatment (e.g., Albert Einstein's original work) is based on the invariance of the speed of light. However, this is not necessarily the starting point: indeed (as is described, for example, in the second volume of the Course of Theoretical Physics by Landau and Lifshitz), what is really at stake is the locality of interactions: one supposes that the influence that one particle, say, exerts on another can not be transmitted instantaneously. Hence, there exists a theoretical maximal speed of information transmission which must be invariant, and it turns out that this speed coincides with the speed of light in vacuum. Newton had himself called the idea of action at a distance philosophically "absurd", and held that gravity had to be transmitted by some agent according to certain laws.

Michelson and Morley in 1887 designed an experiment, employing an interferometer and a half-silvered mirror, that was accurate enough to detect aether flow. The mirror system reflected the light back into the interferometer. If there were an aether drift, it would produce a phase shift and a change in the interference that would be detected. However, no phase shift was ever found. The negative outcome of the Michelson–Morley experiment left the concept of aether (or its drift) undermined. There was consequent perplexity as to why light evidently behaves like a wave, without any detectable medium through which wave activity might propagate.

In a 1964 paper, Erik Christopher Zeeman showed that the causality-preserving property, a condition that is weaker in a mathematical sense than the invariance of the speed of light, is enough to assure that the coordinate transformations are the Lorentz transformations. Norman Goldstein's paper shows a similar result using inertiality (the preservation of time-like lines) rather than causality.

== Physical principles ==
Einstein based his theory of special relativity on two fundamental postulates. First, all physical laws are the same for all inertial frames of reference, regardless of their relative state of motion; and second, the speed of light in free space is the same in all inertial frames of reference, again, regardless of the relative velocity of each reference frame. The Lorentz transformation is fundamentally a direct consequence of this second postulate.

=== The second postulate ===
Assume the second postulate of special relativity stating the constancy of the speed of light, independent of reference frame, and consider a collection of reference systems moving with respect to each other with constant velocity, i.e. inertial systems, each endowed with its own set of Cartesian coordinates labeling the points, i.e. events of spacetime. To express the invariance of the speed of light in mathematical form, fix two events in spacetime, to be recorded in each reference frame. Let the first event be the emission of a light signal, and the second event be it being absorbed.

Pick any reference frame in the collection. In its coordinates, the first event will be assigned coordinates $x_1, y_1, z_1, ct_1$, and the second $x_2, y_2, z_2, ct_2$. The spatial distance between emission and absorption is $\sqrt{(x_2-x_1)^2+(y_2-y_1)^2+(z_2-z_1)^2}$, but this is also the distance $c(t_2-t_1)$ traveled by the signal. One may therefore set up the equation

$$c^2(t_2 - t_1)^2 - (x_2 - x_1)^2 - (y_2 - y_1)^2 - (z_2 - z_1)^2 = 0.$$

Every other coordinate system will record, in its own coordinates, the same equation. This is the immediate mathematical consequence of the invariance of the speed of light. The quantity on the left is called the spacetime interval. The interval is, for events separated by light signals, the same (zero) in all reference frames, and is therefore called invariant.

=== Invariance of interval ===
For the Lorentz transformation to have the physical significance realized by nature, it is crucial that the interval is an invariant quantity for any two events, not just for those separated by light signals. To establish this, one considers an infinitesimal interval,

$$ds^2 = c^2 dt^2 - dx^2 - dy^2 - dz^2,$$

as recorded in a system $K$. Let $K'$ be another system assigning the interval $ds'^2$ to the same two infinitesimally separated events. Since if $ds^2 = 0$, then the interval will also be zero in any other system (second postulate), and since $ds^2$ and $ds'^2$ are infinitesimals of the same order, they must be proportional to each other,
$$ds^2 = a ds'^2.$$

On what may $a$ depend? It may not depend on the positions of the two events in spacetime, because that would violate the postulated homogeneity of spacetime. It might depend on the relative velocity $V'$ between $K$ and $K'$, but only on the speed, not on the direction, because the latter would violate the isotropy of space.

Now bring in systems $K_1$ and $K_2$,
$$ds^2 = a(V_1)ds_1^2, \quad ds^2 = a(V_2)ds_2^2, \quad ds_1^2 = a(V_{12})ds_2^2.$$
From these it follows,
$$\frac{a(V_2)}{a(V_1)} = a(V_{12}).$$

Now, one observes that on the right-hand side that $V_{12}$ depend on both $V_1$ and $V_2$; as well as on the angle between the vectors $\textbf{V}_1$ and $\textbf{V}_2$. However, one also observes that the left-hand side does not depend on this angle. Thus, the only way for the equation to hold true is if the function $a(V)$ is a constant. Further, by the same equation this constant is unity. Thus,
$$ds^2 = ds'^2$$
for all systems $K'$. Since this holds for all infinitesimal intervals, it holds for all intervals.

Most, if not all, derivations of the Lorentz transformations take this for granted. In those derivations, they use the constancy of the speed of light (invariance of light-like separated events) only. This result ensures that the Lorentz transformation is the correct transformation.

==== Rigorous Statement and Proof of Proportionality of ds^{2} and ds′^{2} ====
Theorem: Let $n,p\geq 1$ be integers, $d:= n+p$ and $V$ a vector space over $\Reals$ of dimension $d$. Let $h$ be an indefinite-inner product on $V$ with signature type $(n,p)$. Suppose $g$ is a symmetric bilinear form on $V$ such that the null set of the associated quadratic form of $h$ is contained in that of $g$ (i.e. suppose that for every $v \in V$, if $h(v,v) = 0$ then $g(v,v)=0$). Then, there exists a constant $C\in\Reals$ such that $g = Ch$. Furthermore, if we assume $n\neq p$ and that $g$ also has signature type $(n,p)$, then we have $C>0$.

Remarks.
- In the section above, the term "infinitesimal" in relation to $ds^2$ is actually referring (pointwise) to a quadratic form over a four-dimensional real vector space (namely the tangent space at a point of the spacetime manifold). The argument above is copied almost verbatim from Landau and Lifshitz, where the proportionality of $ds^2$ and $ds'^2$ is merely stated as an 'obvious' fact even though the statement is not formulated in a mathematically precise fashion nor proven. This is a non-obvious mathematical fact which needs to be justified; fortunately the proof is relatively simple and it amounts to basic algebraic observations and manipulations.
- The above assumptions on $h$ means the following: $h:V\times V\to\Reals$ is a bilinear form which is symmetric and non-degenerate, such that there exists an ordered basis $\{v_1,\dots, v_n,v_{n+1},\dots, v_d\}$ of $V$ for which
  $$h(v_a,v_b) =
\begin{cases}
-1 & \text{if } a = b, \text{where } a,b \in \{1,\dots, n\}\\
1 & \text{if } a = b, \text{where } a,b \in \{n+1,\dots, d\}\\
0&\text{ otherwise}
\end{cases}$$
  An equivalent way of saying this is that $h$ has the matrix representation
  $$\begin{pmatrix} -I_n & 0 \\0 & I_p\end{pmatrix}$$
  relative to the ordered basis $\{v_1,\dots, v_d\}$.
- If we consider the special case where $n = 1, p = 3$ then we're dealing with the situation of Lorentzian signature in 4-dimensions, which is what relativity is based on (or one could adopt the opposite convention with an overall minus sign; but this clearly doesn't affect the truth of the theorem). Also, in this case, if we assume $g$ and $h$ both have quadratics forms with the same null-set (in physics terminology, we say that $g$ and $h$ give rise to the same light cone) then the theorem tells us that there is a constant $C>0$ such that $g = Ch$. Modulo some differences in notation, this is precisely what was used in the section above.
Proof of Theorem (index notation)

For convenience, let us agree in this proof that Greek indices like $\alpha,\beta$ range over $\{1,\dots, n\}$ while Latin indices like $i,j$ range over $\{n+1,\dots, p\}$. Also, we shall use the Einstein summation convention throughout.

Fix a basis $\{v_1,\dots, v_d\}$ of $V$ relative to which $h$ has the matrix representation
$$[h]=
\begin{pmatrix}
-I_n&0\\
0&I_p
\end{pmatrix}$$
. Also, for each $x=(x^1,\dots, x^n)\in \Reals^n$ and $y=(y^{n+1}\dots, y^{n+p})\in\Reals^p$ having unit Euclidean norm consider the vector $w=x^{\alpha}v_{\alpha}+y^iv_i\in V$. Then, by bilinearity we have $h(w,w)=-\lVert x\rVert^2+\lVert y\rVert^2=-1+1=0$, hence by our assumption, we have $g(w,w)=0$ as well. Using bilinearity and symmetry of $g$, this is equivalent to

$$g_{\alpha\beta}x^{\alpha}x^{\beta} + 2g_{\alpha i}x^{\alpha}y^i + g_{ij} y^i y^j= 0.$$
Since this is true for all $x,y$ of unit norm, we can replace $y$ with $-y$ to get
$$g_{\alpha\beta}x^{\alpha}x^{\beta} - 2g_{\alpha i}x^{\alpha}y^i + g_{ij} y^i y^j= 0.$$
Now, we subtract these two equations and divide by 4 to obtain that for all $x,y$ of unit norm,
$$g_{\alpha i}x^{\alpha}y^i= 0.$$
So, by choosing $x = e_{\alpha} \in \Reals^n$ and $y = e_i \in \Reals^p$ (i.e with 1 in the specified index and 0 elsewhere), we see that $g_{\alpha i}=0$. As a result of this, our first equation is simplified to
$$g_{\alpha\beta}x^{\alpha}x^{\beta}=-g_{ij}y^iy^j.$$
This is once again true for all $x\in\Reals^n$ and $y\in\Reals^p$ of unit norm. As a result all the off-diagonal terms vanish; in more detail, suppose $\alpha,\beta\in\{1,\dots, n\}$ are distinct indices. Consider $x_{\pm}=\frac{1}{\sqrt{2}}(e_{\alpha}\pm e_{\beta})$. Then, since the right side of the equation doesn't depend on $x$, we see that $g_{\alpha\beta}=-g_{\alpha\beta}$ and hence $g_{\alpha\beta}=0$. By an almost identical argument we deduce that if $i,j\in\{n+1,\dots, n+p\}$ are distinct indices then $g_{ij}=0$.

Finally, by successively letting $x$ range over $e_1,\dots, e_n\in\Reals^n$ and then letting $y$ range over $e_1,\dots, e_p\in\Reals^p$, we see that
$$-g_{11}=\dots = -g_{nn}=g_{n+1,n+1}=\dots = g_{n+p,n+p}$$,

or in other words, $g$ has the matrix representation
$$[g]=-g_{11}\cdot
\begin{pmatrix}
-I_n& 0\\
0 & I_p
\end{pmatrix}$$
, which is equivalent to saying $g=-g_{11}\cdot h$. So, the constant of proportionality claimed in the theorem is $C=-g_{11}$. Finally, if we assume that $g,h$ both have signature types $(n,p)$ and $n\neq p$ then $C := -g_{11}>0$ (we can't have $C = 0$ because that would mean $g = 0$, which is impossible since having signature type $(n,p)$ means it is a non-zero bilinear form. Also, if $C<0$, then it means $g$ has $n$ positive diagonal entries and $p$ negative diagonal entries; i.e it is of signature $(p,n)\neq (n,p)$, since we assumed $n\neq p$, so this is also not possible. This leaves us with $C > 0$ as the only option). This completes the proof of the theorem.
Proof of Theorem (conceptual)

Fix a basis $\{v_1,\dots, v_d\}$ of $V$ relative to which $h$ has the matrix representation
$$[h]=
\begin{pmatrix}
-I_n&0\\
0&I_p
\end{pmatrix}$$
. The point is that the vector space $V$ can be decomposed into subspaces $V^-$ (the span of the first $n$ basis vectors) and $V^+$ (then span of the other $p$ basis vectors) such that each vector in $V$ can be written uniquely as $v + w$ for $v \in V^-$ and $w \in V^+$; moreover $h(v,v) \leq 0$, $h(w,w) \geq 0$ and $h(v,w) = 0$. So (by bilinearity)

$$h(v+w,v+w) = h(v,v) + h(w,w)$$
Since the first summand on the right in non-positive and the second in non-negative, for any $v \in V^-$ and $w \in V^+$, we can find a scalar $\alpha$ such that $h(v + \alpha w, v + \alpha w) = 0$.

From now on, always consider $v \in V^-$ and $w \in V^+$. By bilinearity
$$\begin{align}
g(v+w,v+w) &= g(v,v) + g(w,w) + 2g(v,w) \\
g(v-w,v-w) &= g(v,v) + g(w,w) - 2g(v,w)
\end{align}$$

If $h(v+w,v+w) = 0$, then also $h(v-w, v-w) = 0$ and the same is true for $g$ (since the null-set of $h$ is contained in that of $g$). In that case, subtracting the two expression above (and dividing by 4) yields

$$0 = g(v, w)$$

As above, for each $v \in V^-$ and $w \in V^+$, there is a scalar $\alpha$ such that $h(v + \alpha w, v + \alpha w) = 0$, so $g(v, \alpha w) = 0$, which by bilinearity means $g(v,w) = 0$.

Now consider nonzero $v, v' \in V^-$ such that $h(v, v) = h(v', v')$. We can find $w \in V^+$ such that $0 = h(v + w, v + w) = h(v,v) + h(w,w) = h(v' + w, v' + w)$. By the expressions above,
$$g(v,v) = -g(w,w) = g(v', v')$$
Analogically, for $w, w' \in V^+$, one can show that if $h(w,w)=h(w',w')$, then also $g(w,w)=g(w',w')$. So it holds for all vectors in $V$.

For $u, u' \in V$, if $g(u, u) = Ch(u, u) \neq 0$, $g(u', u') = C'h(u',u') \neq 0$ for some $C, C' \in \mathbb{R}$, we can (scaling one of the if necessary) assume $h(u, u) = h(u',u')$, which by the above means that $C = C'$. So $g = Ch$.

Finally, if we assume that $g,h$ both have signature types $(n,p)$ and $n\neq p$ then $C >0$ (we can't have $C = 0$ because that would mean $g = 0$, which is impossible since having signature type $(n,p)$ means it is a non-zero bilinear form. Also, if $C<0$, then it means $g$ has $n$ positive diagonal entries and $p$ negative diagonal entries; i.e. it is of signature $(p,n)\neq (n,p)$, since we assumed $n\neq p$, so this is also not possible. This leaves us with $C > 0$ as the only option). This completes the proof of the theorem.
Proof of Theorem (conceptual and broken down)

By Sylvester's law of inertia, we can fix a basis $\{v_1,\dots, v_d\}$ of $V$ relative to which $h$ has the matrix representation
$$[h]=
\begin{pmatrix}
-I_n&0\\
0&I_p
\end{pmatrix}$$
. The point is that the vector space $V$ can be decomposed into subspaces $V^-$ (the span of the first $n$ basis vectors) and $V^+$ (then span of the other $p$ basis vectors) such that each vector in $V$ can be written uniquely as $v + w$ for $v \in V^-$ and $w \in V^+$; moreover $h(v,v) \leq 0$, $h(w,w) \geq 0$ and $h(v,w) = 0$. We will write $h(u)$ for $h(u,u)$ from now on.

Lemma: There exists a constant $C\in\Reals$ such that for any $v \in V^-$ and $w \in V^+$,

(a) $g(v,w) = 0$

(b) $g(u) = Ch(u)$, where $u = v+w$

Proof of Lemma
1. Let a = $\sqrt{-h(v)}, b = \sqrt{h(w)}$.
  By bilinearity:
2. $h(bv+aw) = h(bv)+h(aw) = b^2h(v)+a^2h(w) = 0$
3. $h(bv-aw) = h(bv)+h(-aw) = b^2h(v)+a^2h(w) = 0$
  Since the null set of $h$ is contained in that of $g$:
4. $0 = g(bv+aw) = b^2g(v)+2bag(v,w)+a^2g(w)$
5. $0 = g(bv-aw) = b^2g(v)-2bag(v,w)+a^2g(w)$
  Adding/subtracting 4 and 5 from each other gives 6 and 7:
6. $g(bv,aw) = 0$
7. $b^2g(v)+a^2g(w) = 0$
  By 6, $g(v,w) = 0$, proving (a),
  By 7 and 2,
  $b^2g(v)=-a^2g(w)$ and
  $b^2h(v)=-a^2h(w)$
8. so $\frac{g(v)}{h(v)} = \frac{g(w)}{h(w)}$.

Keeping $v$ fixed and varying $w$, we see that this ratio does not depend and $w$. Similarly, it does not depend on $v$.

Call this ratio $C$., we have $g(u) = g(v) + g(w) = Ch(v) + Ch(w) = Ch(u)$, where the first equation follows from (a). This proves (b).$\quad\square$

For all $u,u'\in V$, we have $g(u,u') = \frac{g(u+u')-g(u-u')}{4} = \frac{Ch(u+u')-Ch(u-u')}{4} = Ch(u,u')$, where the first and last equations follow from bilinearity, and the middle equation follows from Lemma part (b).

So $g = Ch. \quad \square$

== Standard configuration ==
The spacetime coordinates of an event, as measured by each observer in their inertial reference frame (in standard configuration) are shown in the speech bubbles. Top: frame F′ moves at velocity v along the x-axis of frame F. Bottom: frame F moves at velocity −v along the x′-axis of frame F′.

The invariant interval can be seen as a non-positive definite distance function on spacetime. The set of transformations sought must leave this distance invariant. Due to the reference frame's coordinate system's cartesian nature, one concludes that, as in the Euclidean case, the possible transformations are made up of translations and rotations, where a slightly broader meaning should be allowed for the term rotation.

The interval is quite trivially invariant under translation. For rotations, there are four coordinates. Hence there are six planes of rotation. Three of those are rotations in spatial planes. The interval is invariant under ordinary rotations too.

It remains to find a "rotation" in the three remaining coordinate planes that leaves the interval invariant. Equivalently, to find a way to assign coordinates so that they coincide with the coordinates corresponding to a moving frame.

The general problem is to find a transformation such that
$$\begin{align}
& c^2(t_2 - t_1)^2 - (x_2 - x_1)^2 - (y_2 - y_1)^2 - (z_2 - z_1)^2 \\
={}& c^2(t_2' - t_1')^2 - (x_2' - x_1')^2 - (y_2' - y_1')^2 - (z_2' - z_1')^2.
\end{align}$$

To solve the general problem, one may use the knowledge about invariance of the interval of translations and ordinary rotations to assume, without loss of generality, that the frames F and F′ are aligned in such a way that their coordinate axes all meet at t = t′ = 0 and that the x and x′ axes are permanently aligned and system F′ has speed V along the positive x-axis. Call this the standard configuration. It reduces the general problem to finding a transformation such that

$$c^2(t_2 - t_1)^2 - (x_2 - x_1)^2 = c^2(t_2' - t_1')^2 - (x_2' - x_1')^2.$$

The standard configuration is used in most examples below. A linear solution of the simpler problem

$$(ct)^2 - x^2 = (ct')^2 - x'^2$$

solves the more general problem since coordinate differences then transform the same way. Linearity is often assumed or argued somehow in the literature when this simpler problem is considered. If the solution to the simpler problem is not linear, then it doesn't solve the original problem because of the cross terms appearing when expanding the squares.

== The solutions ==
As mentioned, the general problem is solved by translations in spacetime. These do not appear as a solution to the simpler problem posed, while the boosts do (and sometimes rotations depending on angle of attack). Even more solutions exist if one only insist on invariance of the interval for lightlike separated events. These are nonlinear conformal ("angle preserving") transformations. One has

Lorentz transformations ⊂ Poincaré transformations ⊂ conformal group transformations.

Some equations of physics are conformal invariant, e.g. the Maxwell's equations in source-free space, but not all. The relevance of the conformal transformations in spacetime is not known at present, but the conformal group in two dimensions is highly relevant in conformal field theory and statistical mechanics. It is thus the Poincaré group that is singled out by the postulates of special relativity. It is the presence of Lorentz boosts (for which velocity addition is different from mere vector addition that would allow for speeds greater than the speed of light) as opposed to ordinary boosts that separates it from the Galilean group of Galilean relativity. Spatial rotations, spatial and temporal inversions and translations are present in both groups and have the same consequences in both theories (conservation laws of momentum, energy, and angular momentum). Not all accepted theories respect symmetry under the inversions.

== Using the geometry of spacetime ==
=== Landau & Lifshitz solution ===
These three hyperbolic function formulae (H1–H3) are referenced below:

1. $\cosh^2\Psi - \sinh^2 \Psi = 1,$
2. $\sinh \Psi= \frac{\tanh\Psi}{\sqrt{1-\tanh^2\Psi}},$
3. $\cosh\Psi = \frac{1}{\sqrt{1-\tanh^2\Psi}},$

The problem posed in standard configuration for a boost in the x-direction, where the primed coordinates refer to the moving system is solved by finding a linear solution to the simpler problem

$$(ct)^2 - x^2 = (ct')^2 - x'^2.$$

The most general solution is, as can be verified by direct substitution using (H1),

| $x = x'\cosh\Psi + ct'\sinh \Psi, \quad ct = x'\sinh \Psi + ct'\cosh \Psi.$ | 1 |

To find the role of Ψ in the physical setting, record the progression of the origin of F′, i.e. x′ = 0, x = vt. The equations become (using first x′ = 0),

$$x = ct'\sinh \Psi, \quad ct =  ct'\cosh \Psi.$$

Now divide:

$$\frac{x}{ct} = \tanh \Psi = \frac{v}{c} \Rightarrow \quad \sinh \Psi= \frac{\frac{v}{c}}{\sqrt{1-{\frac{v^2}{c^2}}}}, \quad \cosh\Psi = \frac{1}{\sqrt{1-{\frac{v^2}{c^2}}}},$$

where x = vt was used in the first step, (H2) and (H3) in the second, which, when plugged back in (1), gives

$$x=\frac{x'+vt'}{\sqrt{1-\frac{v^2}{c^2}}}, \quad t= \frac{t'+\frac{v}{c^2}x'}{\sqrt{1-\frac{v^2}{c^2}}},$$

or, with the usual abbreviations,

$x=\gamma(x'+vt'),\,\, t=\gamma\left(t'+\frac{vx'}{c^2}\right),\quad x'=\gamma(x-v t),\,\, t'=\gamma\left(t-\frac{vx}{c^2}\right).$

This calculation is repeated with more detail in section hyperbolic rotation.

=== Hyperbolic rotation ===
The Lorentz transformations can also be derived by simple application of the special relativity postulates and using hyperbolic identities.

Relativity postulates

Start from the equations of the spherical wave front of a light pulse, centred at the origin:

$$(ct)^2 - (x^2+y^2+z^2) = (ct')^2 - (x'^2+y'^2+z'^2) =0$$

which take the same form in both frames because of the special relativity postulates. Next, consider relative motion along the x-axes of each frame, in standard configuration above, so that y = y′, z = z′, which simplifies to

$$(ct)^2 - x^2 = (ct')^2 - x'^2$$

Linearity

Now assume that the transformations take the linear form:

$$\begin{align}
x' & = Ax + Bct \\
ct' & = Cx + Dct
\end{align}$$

where A, B, C, D are to be found. If they were non-linear, they would not take the same form for all observers, since fictitious forces (hence accelerations) would occur in one frame even if the velocity was constant in another, which is inconsistent with inertial frame transformations.

Substituting into the previous result:

$$(ct)^2 - x^2 = [(Cx)^2 + (Dct)^2 + 2CDcxt] - [(Ax)^2 + (Bct)^2 + 2ABcxt]$$

and comparing coefficients of x^{2}, t^{2}, xt:

$$\begin{align}
- 1 = C^2 - A^2 & \Rightarrow & A^2 - C^2 = 1 \\
c^2 = (Dc)^2 - (Bc)^2 & \Rightarrow & D^2 - B^2 = 1 \\
2CDc - 2ABc = 0 & \Rightarrow & AB = CD
\end{align}$$

Hyperbolic rotation

The equations suggest the hyperbolic identity $\cosh^2\phi-\sinh^2\phi=1 .$

Introducing the rapidity parameter ϕ as a hyperbolic angle allows the consistent identifications

$$A = D = \cosh\phi\,,\quad C = B = -\sinh\phi$$

where the signs after the square roots are chosen so that x' and t' increase if x and t increase, respectively. The hyperbolic transformations have been solved for:

$$\begin{align}
x' & = x \cosh\phi  - ct \sinh\phi  \\
ct' & = -x \sinh\phi  + ct \cosh\phi
\end{align}$$

If the signs were chosen differently the position and time coordinates would need to be replaced by −x and/or −t so that x and t increase not decrease.

To find how ϕ relates to the relative velocity, from the standard configuration the origin of the primed frame x′ = 0 is measured in the unprimed frame to be x = vt (or the equivalent and opposite way round; the origin of the unprimed frame is x = 0 and in the primed frame it is at x′ = −vt):

$$0 = vt \cosh\phi  - ct \sinh\phi \, \Rightarrow \, \tanh\phi = \frac{v}{c} = \beta$$

and hyperbolic identities $\sinh \Psi= \frac{\tanh\Psi}{\sqrt{1-\tanh^2\Psi}},\, \cosh\Psi = \frac{1}{\sqrt{1-\tanh^2\Psi}}$ leads to the relations between β, γ, and ϕ,

$$\cosh\phi = \gamma,\,\quad \sinh\phi=\beta\gamma \,.$$

=== From Causality and the Order of Events ===
A series of results in the 1960s and 1970s, culminating in the work of A. D. Alexandrov, showed that the Lorentz transformations can be derived from even more fundamental, qualitative properties of spacetime than the constancy of the speed of light.

A. D. Alexandrov's Chronogeometry (1950-1976): Beginning in 1949 and fully developed over two decades, A. D. Alexandrov established the most general results in this area. His approach, which he termed "chronogeometry" (the geometry of time), starts with the causal order of events. He considered the set of all transformations that preserve the "after" relation (i.e., if event A can influence event B, then the transformed event f(A) can influence f(B)). Alexandrov's seminal contribution was to prove that any one-to-one mapping of Minkowski space (or even a region of it) onto itself that preserves the causal order—or, more strongly, the family of light cones—must be a Lorentz transformation composed with a dilation. His work is particularly notable for also classifying the conformal transformations of spacetime (including inversions) as the only local causal automorphisms.

E. C. Zeeman's Causality (1964): In a 1964 paper, Erik Christopher Zeeman independently showed a related, but less general, result. He demonstrated that any automorphism of Minkowski space (a one-to-one map onto itself) that preserves the causal relation—a condition weaker than the invariance of the speed of light in a mathematical sense—is necessarily an element of the Lorentz group, combined with translations and dilations. While highly influential, Zeeman's theorem assumes the mapping is defined on the entire space, whereas Alexandrov's later work extended the results to local mappings of domains.

The collective conclusion of these theorems is profound: the causal structure of spacetime, defined simply by which events can influence which others, is enough to uniquely determine its geometry as being Minkowskian and its symmetries as being the Lorentz transformations. This places the principle of causality as a more fundamental axiom than the constancy of the speed of light in the logical structure of special relativity.

== From physical principles ==
The problem is usually restricted to two dimensions by using a velocity along the x axis such that the y and z coordinates do not intervene, as described in standard configuration above.

=== Time dilation and length contraction ===
The transformation equations can be derived from time dilation and length contraction, which in turn can be derived from first principles. With O and O′ representing the spatial origins of the frames F and F′, and some event M, the relation between the position vectors (which here reduce to oriented segments OM, OO′ and O′M) in both frames is given by:

OM = OO′ + O′M.

Using coordinates (x,t) in F and (x′,t′) in F′ for event M, in frame F the segments are OM = x, OO′ = vt and O′M = x′/γ (since x′ is O′M as measured in F′):
$$x = vt + x'/\gamma.$$
Likewise, in frame F′, the segments are OM = x/γ (since x is OM as measured in F), OO′ = vt′ and O′M = x′:
$$x / \gamma = vt' + x'.$$
By rearranging the first equation, we get
$$x' = \gamma(x - vt),$$
which is the space part of the Lorentz transformation. The second relation gives
$$x = \gamma(x' + vt'),$$
which is the inverse of the space part. Eliminating x′ between the two space part equations gives

$$t' = \gamma t + \frac{ \left( 1 - { \gamma^2} \right)x}{ \gamma v}.$$

that, if $\gamma^2=\frac{1}{1-v^2/c^2}$, simplifies to:

$$t' = \gamma(t-vx/c^2),$$
which is the time part of the transformation, the inverse of which is found by a similar elimination of x:
$$t = \gamma(t' + vx'/c^2).$$

=== Spherical wavefronts of light ===
The following is similar to that of Einstein. As in the Galilean transformation, the Lorentz transformation is linear since the relative velocity of the reference frames is constant as a vector; otherwise, inertial forces would appear. They are called inertial or Galilean reference frames. According to relativity no Galilean reference frame is privileged. Another condition is that the speed of light must be independent of the reference frame, in practice of the velocity of the light source.

Consider two inertial frames of reference O and O′, assuming O to be at rest while O′ is moving with a velocity v with respect to O in the positive x-direction. The origins of O and O′ initially coincide with each other. A light signal is emitted from the common origin and travels as a spherical wave front. Consider a point P on a spherical wavefront at a distance r and r′ from the origins of O and O′ respectively. According to the second postulate of the special theory of relativity the speed of light is the same in both frames, so for the point P:
$$\begin{align}
r &= ct \\
r' &= ct'.
\end{align}$$

The equation of a sphere in frame O is given by
$$x^2 + y^2 + z^2 = r^2.$$
For the spherical wavefront that becomes
$$x^2 + y^2 + z^2 = (ct)^2.$$
Similarly, the equation of a sphere in frame O′ is given by
$$x'^2 + y'^2 + z'^2 = r'^2,$$
so the spherical wavefront satisfies
$$x'^2 + y'^2 + z'^2 = (ct')^2.$$

The origin O′ is moving along x-axis. Therefore,
$$\begin{align}
y' &= y \\
z' &= z.
\end{align}$$

x′ must vary linearly with x and t. Therefore, the transformation has the form
$$x' = \gamma x + \sigma t.$$
For the origin of O′ x′ and x are given by
$$\begin{align}
x' &= 0 \\
x &= vt,
\end{align}$$
so, for all t,
$$0 = \gamma vt + \sigma t$$
and thus
$$\sigma = -\gamma v.$$
This simplifies the transformation to
$$x' = \gamma \left( x - v t \right)$$
where γ is to be determined. At this point γ is not necessarily a constant, but is required to reduce to 1 for v ≪ c.

The inverse transformation is the same except that the sign of v is reversed:
$$x = \gamma \left( x' + v t' \right).$$

The above two equations give the relation between t and t′ as:
$$x = \gamma \left[ \gamma \left( x - v t \right) + v t' \right]$$
or
$$t' = \gamma t + \frac{ \left( 1 - { \gamma^2} \right)x}{ \gamma v}.$$

Replacing x′, y′, z′ and t′ in the spherical wavefront equation in the O′ frame,
$$x'^2 + y'^2 + z'^2 = (ct')^2,$$
with their expressions in terms of x, y, z and t produces:
$${\gamma^2} \left( x - v t \right)^2 + y^2 + z^2 = c^2 \left[ \gamma t + \frac{ \left( 1 - { \gamma^2} \right)x}{ \gamma v} \right]^2$$
and therefore,
$$\gamma^2 x^2 + \gamma^2 v^2 t^2 - 2 \gamma^2 v t x + y^2 + z^2 = c^2 {\gamma^2} t^2 + \frac{ \left( 1 - {\gamma^2} \right)^2 c^2 x^2}{ {\gamma^2} v^2} + 2 \frac{ \left( 1 - {\gamma^2} \right) t x c^2}{ v}$$
which implies,
$$\left[ {\gamma^2} - \frac{ \left( 1 - {\gamma^2} \right)^2 c^2}{ {\gamma^2} v^2} \right] x^2 - 2 {\gamma^2} v t x + y^2 + z^2 = \left( c^2 {\gamma^2} - v^2 {\gamma^2} \right) t^2 + 2 \frac{ \left[ 1 - {\gamma^2} \right] t x c^2}{ v}$$
or
$$\left[ {\gamma^2} - \frac{ \left( 1 - {\gamma^2} \right)^2 c^2}{ {\gamma^2} v^2} \right] x^2 - \left[ 2 {\gamma^2} v + 2 \frac{ \left( 1 - {\gamma^2} \right) c^2}{ v}\right] t x + y^2 + z^2 = \left[ c^2 {\gamma^2} - v^2 {\gamma^2} \right] t^2$$

Comparing the coefficient of t^{2} in the above equation with the coefficient of t^{2} in the spherical wavefront equation for frame O produces:
$$c^2 {\gamma^2} - v^2 {\gamma^2} = c^2$$
Equivalent expressions for γ can be obtained by matching the x^{2} coefficients or setting the tx coefficient to zero. Rearranging:
$${\gamma^2} = \frac{1}{1 - \frac{v^2}{c^2}}$$
or, choosing the positive root to ensure that the x and x' axes and the time axes point in the same direction,
$${\gamma} = \frac{1}{ \sqrt{1 - \frac{v^2}{c^2}}}$$
which is called the Lorentz factor. This produces the Lorentz transformation from the above expression. It is given by
$$\begin{align}
x' &= \gamma \left( x - v t \right)\\
t' &= \gamma \left( t - \frac{vx}{c^2} \right) \\
y' &= y \\
z' &= z
\end{align}$$

The Lorentz transformation is not the only transformation leaving invariant the shape of spherical waves, as there is a wider set of spherical wave transformations in the context of conformal geometry, leaving invariant the expression $\lambda\left(\delta x^2 + \delta y^2 + \delta z^2 - c^2\delta t^2\right)$. However, scale changing conformal transformations cannot be used to symmetrically describe all laws of nature including mechanics, whereas the Lorentz transformations (the only one implying $\lambda = 1$) represent a symmetry of all laws of nature and reduce to Galilean transformations at $v \ll c$.

=== Galilean and Einstein's relativity ===
==== Galilean reference frames ====
In classical kinematics, the total displacement x in the R frame is the sum of the relative displacement x′ in frame R′ and of the distance between the two origins x − x′. If v is the relative velocity of R′ relative to R, the transformation is: x = x′ + vt, or x′ = x − vt. This relationship is linear for a constant v, that is when R and R′ are Galilean frames of reference.

In Einstein's relativity, the main difference from Galilean relativity is that space and time coordinates are intertwined, and in different inertial frames t ≠ t′.

Since space is assumed to be homogeneous, the transformation must be linear. The most general linear relationship is obtained with four constant coefficients, A, B, γ, and b:
$$x'=\gamma x + b t$$
$$t'=A x + B t.$$
The linear transformation becomes the Galilean transformation when γ = B = 1, b = −v and A = 0.

An object at rest in the R′ frame at position x′ = 0 moves with constant velocity v in the R frame. Hence the transformation must yield x′ = 0 if x = vt. Therefore, b = −γv and the first equation is written as
$$x'=\gamma \left(x - v t\right) .$$

==== Using the principle of relativity ====
According to the principle of relativity, there is no privileged Galilean frame of reference: therefore the inverse transformation for the position from frame R′ to frame R should have the same form as the original but with the velocity in the opposite direction, i.o.w. replacing v with -v:
$$x=\gamma\left(x' - (-v)t'\right),$$
and thus
$$x=\gamma\left(x' + vt'\right) .$$

==== Determining the constants of the first equation ====
Since the speed of light is the same in all frames of reference, for the case of a light signal, the transformation must guarantee that t = x/c when t′ = x′/c.

Substituting for t and t′ in the preceding equations gives:
$$x'= \gamma\left(1 - v/c\right) x ,$$
$$x= \gamma\left(1 + v/c\right) x'.$$
Multiplying these two equations together gives,
$$xx' = \gamma^2 \left(1 - v^2/c^2\right) xx'.$$
At any time after t = t′ = 0, xx′ is not zero, so dividing both sides of the equation by xx′ results in
$$\gamma=\frac{1}{\sqrt{1 - \frac{v^2}{c^2}}},$$
which is called the "Lorentz factor".

When the transformation equations are required to satisfy the light signal equations in the form x = ct and x′ = ct′, by substituting the x and x'-values, the same technique produces the same expression for the Lorentz factor.

==== Determining the constants of the second equation ====
The transformation equation for time can be easily obtained by considering the special case of a light signal, again satisfying x = ct and x′ = ct′, by substituting term by term into the earlier obtained equation for the spatial coordinate
$$x'=\gamma (x - v t), \,$$
giving
$$ct'=\gamma \left(ct - \frac{v}{c} x\right),$$
so that
$$t'=\gamma \left(t - \frac{v}{c^2} x\right),$$
which, when identified with
$$t'=A x + B t, \,$$
determines the transformation coefficients A and B as
$$A= -\gamma v/c^2,\,$$
$$B=\gamma. \,$$
So A and B are the unique constant coefficients necessary to preserve the constancy of the speed of light in the primed system of coordinates.

=== Einstein's popular derivation ===
In his popular book Einstein derived the Lorentz transformation by arguing that there must be two non-zero coupling constants λ and μ such that

$$\begin{cases}
x' - ct' = \lambda \left( x - ct \right) \\
x' + ct' = \mu \left( x + ct \right) \,
\end{cases}$$

that correspond to light traveling along the positive and negative x-axis, respectively. For light x = ct if and only if x′ = ct′. Adding and subtracting the two equations and defining

$$\begin{cases}
\gamma = \left( \lambda + \mu \right) /2 \\
b = \left( \lambda - \mu \right) /2 ,\,
\end{cases}$$

gives

$$\begin{cases}
x' = \gamma x - bct \\
ct' = \gamma ct - bx . \,
\end{cases}$$

Substituting x′ = 0 corresponding to x = vt and noting that the relative velocity is v = bc/γ, this gives

$$\begin{cases}
x' = \gamma \left( x - vt \right) \\
t' = \gamma \left( t - \frac{v}{c^2} x \right) \,
\end{cases}$$

The constant γ can be evaluated by demanding c^{2}t^{2} − x^{2} = c^{2}t′^{2} − x′^{2} as per standard configuration.

== Using group theory ==
=== From group postulates ===
Following is a classical derivation (see, e.g., and references therein) based on group postulates and isotropy of the space.

Coordinate transformations as a group

The coordinate transformations between inertial frames form a group (called the proper Lorentz group) with the group operation being the composition of transformations (performing one transformation after another). Indeed, the four group axioms are satisfied:

1. Closure: the composition of two transformations is a transformation: consider a composition of transformations from the inertial frame K to inertial frame K′, (denoted as K → K′), and then from K′ to inertial frame K′′, [K′ → K′′], there exists a transformation, [K → K′] [K′ → K′′], directly from an inertial frame K to inertial frame K′′.
2. Associativity: the transformations ( [K → K′] [K′ → K′′] ) [K′′ → K′′′] and [K → K′] ( [K′ → K′′] [K′′ → K′′′] ) are identical.
3. Identity element: there is an identity element, a transformation K → K.
4. Inverse element: for any transformation K → K′ there exists an inverse transformation K′ → K.

Transformation matrices consistent with group axioms

Consider two inertial frames, K and K′, the latter moving with velocity v with respect to the former. By rotations and shifts we can choose the x and x′ axes along the relative velocity vector and also that the events (t, x) = (0,0) and (t′, x′) = (0,0) coincide. Since the velocity boost is along the x (and x′) axes nothing happens to the perpendicular coordinates and we can just omit them for brevity. Now since the transformation we are looking after connects two inertial frames, it has to transform a linear motion in (t, x) into a linear motion in (t′, x′) coordinates. Therefore, it must be a linear transformation. The general form of a linear transformation is
$$\begin{bmatrix}
t' \\ x'
\end{bmatrix} =
\begin{bmatrix}
\gamma & \delta \\
\beta & \alpha
\end{bmatrix}
\begin{bmatrix}
t \\ x
\end{bmatrix},$$
where α, β, γ and δ are some yet unknown functions of the relative velocity v.

Let us now consider the motion of the origin of the frame K′. In the K′ frame it has coordinates (t′, x′ = 0), while in the K frame it has coordinates (t, x = vt). These two points are connected by the transformation
$$\begin{bmatrix}
t' \\ 0
\end{bmatrix} =
\begin{bmatrix}
\gamma & \delta \\
\beta & \alpha
\end{bmatrix}
\begin{bmatrix}
t \\ vt
\end{bmatrix},$$
from which we get
$$\beta = -v\alpha \,.$$
Analogously, considering the motion of the origin of the frame K, we get
$$\begin{bmatrix}
t' \\ -vt'
\end{bmatrix} =
\begin{bmatrix}
\gamma & \delta \\
\beta & \alpha
\end{bmatrix}
\begin{bmatrix}
t \\ 0
\end{bmatrix},$$
from which we get
$$\beta=-v\gamma \,.$$
Combining these two gives α = γ and the transformation matrix has simplified,
$$\begin{bmatrix}
t' \\ x'
\end{bmatrix} =
\begin{bmatrix}
\gamma & \delta \\
-v\gamma & \gamma
\end{bmatrix}
\begin{bmatrix}
t \\ x
\end{bmatrix}.$$

Now consider the group postulate inverse element. There are two ways we can go from the K′ coordinate system to the K coordinate system. The first is to apply the inverse of the transform matrix to the K′ coordinates:

$$\begin{bmatrix}
t \\ x
\end{bmatrix} =
\frac{1}{\gamma^2+v\delta\gamma}
\begin{bmatrix}
\gamma & -\delta \\
v\gamma & \gamma
\end{bmatrix}
\begin{bmatrix}
t' \\ x'
\end{bmatrix}.$$

The second is, considering that the K′ coordinate system is moving at a velocity v relative to the K coordinate system, the K coordinate system must be moving at a velocity −v relative to the K′ coordinate system. Replacing v with −v in the transformation matrix gives:

$$\begin{bmatrix}
t \\ x
\end{bmatrix} =
\begin{bmatrix}
\gamma(-v) & \delta(-v) \\
v\gamma(-v) & \gamma(-v)
\end{bmatrix}
\begin{bmatrix}
t' \\ x'
\end{bmatrix},$$

Now the function γ can not depend upon the direction of v because it is apparently the factor which defines the relativistic contraction and time dilation. These two (in an isotropic world of ours) cannot depend upon the direction of v. Thus, γ(−v) = γ(v) and comparing the two matrices, we get
$$\gamma^2 + v\delta\gamma = 1.$$

According to the closure group postulate a composition of two coordinate transformations is also a coordinate transformation, thus the product of two of our matrices should also be a matrix of the same form. Transforming K to K′ and from K′ to K′′ gives the following transformation matrix to go from K to K′′:

$$\begin{align}
\begin{bmatrix}
t'' \\ x''
\end{bmatrix} & =
\begin{bmatrix}
\gamma(v') & \delta(v') \\
-v'\gamma(v') & \gamma(v')
\end{bmatrix}
\begin{bmatrix}
\gamma(v) & \delta(v) \\
-v\gamma(v) & \gamma(v)
\end{bmatrix}
\begin{bmatrix}
t \\ x
\end{bmatrix}\\
& = \begin{bmatrix}
\gamma(v')\gamma(v)-v\delta(v')\gamma(v) & \gamma(v')\delta(v)+\delta(v')\gamma(v) \\
-(v'+v)\gamma(v')\gamma(v) & -v'\gamma(v')\delta(v)+\gamma(v')\gamma(v)
\end{bmatrix}
\begin{bmatrix}
t\\x
\end{bmatrix}.
\end{align}$$

In the original transform matrix, the main diagonal elements are both equal to γ, hence, for the combined transform matrix above to be of the same form as the original transform matrix, the main diagonal elements must also be equal. Equating these elements and rearranging gives:

$$\begin{align}
\gamma(v')\gamma(v)-v\delta(v')\gamma(v) &= -v'\gamma(v')\delta(v)+\gamma(v')\gamma(v) \\
v\delta(v')\gamma(v) &= v'\gamma(v')\delta(v) \\
\frac{\delta(v)}{v\gamma(v)} &= \frac{\delta(v')}{v'\gamma(v')}.
\end{align}$$

The denominator will be nonzero for nonzero v, because γ(v) is always nonzero;

$$\gamma^2 + v \delta \gamma = 1.$$

If v = 0 we have the identity matrix which coincides with putting v = 0 in the matrix we get at the end of this derivation for the other values of v, making the final matrix valid for all nonnegative v.

For the nonzero v, this combination of function must be a universal constant, one and the same for all inertial frames. Define this constant as δ(v)/v γ(v) = κ, where κ has the dimension of 1/v^{2}. Solving
$$1 = \gamma^2 + v\delta\gamma = \gamma^2 (1 + \kappa v^2)$$
we finally get
$$\gamma = 1/\sqrt{1 + \kappa v^2}$$
and thus the transformation matrix, consistent with the group axioms, is given by

$$\begin{bmatrix}
t' \\ x'
\end{bmatrix} =
\frac{1}{\sqrt{1 + \kappa v^2}}
\begin{bmatrix}
1 & \kappa v \\
-v & 1
\end{bmatrix}
\begin{bmatrix}
t \\ x
\end{bmatrix}.$$

If κ > 0, then there would be transformations (with κv^{2} ≫ 1) which transform time into a spatial coordinate and vice versa. We exclude this on physical grounds, because time can only run in the positive direction. Thus two types of transformation matrices are consistent with group postulates:

1. with the universal constant κ = 0, and
2. with κ < 0.

Galilean transformations

If κ = 0 then we get the Galilean-Newtonian kinematics with the Galilean transformation,
$$\begin{bmatrix}
t' \\ x'
\end{bmatrix} =
\begin{bmatrix}
1 & 0 \\
-v & 1
\end{bmatrix}
\begin{bmatrix}
t \\ x
\end{bmatrix}\;,$$
where time is absolute, t′ = t, and the relative velocity v of two inertial frames is not limited.

Lorentz transformations

If κ < 0, then we set $c = 1/\sqrt{-\kappa}$ which becomes the invariant speed, the speed of light in vacuum. This yields κ = −1/c^{2} and thus we get special relativity with Lorentz transformation
$$\begin{bmatrix}
t' \\ x'
\end{bmatrix} =
\frac{1}{\sqrt{1 - {v^2 \over c^2}}}
\begin{bmatrix}
1 & {- v \over c^2} \\
-v & 1
\end{bmatrix}
\begin{bmatrix}
t \\ x
\end{bmatrix}\;,$$
where the speed of light is a finite universal constant determining the highest possible relative velocity between inertial frames.

If v ≪ c the Galilean transformation is a good approximation to the Lorentz transformation.

Only experiment can answer the question which of the two possibilities, κ = 0 or κ < 0, is realized in our world. The experiments measuring the speed of light, first performed by a Danish physicist Ole Rømer, show that it is finite, and the Michelson–Morley experiment showed that it is an absolute speed, and thus that κ < 0.

=== Boost from generators ===
Using rapidity ϕ to parametrize the Lorentz transformation, the boost in the x direction is

$$\begin{bmatrix} c t' \\ x' \\ y' \\ z' \end{bmatrix} = \begin{bmatrix} \cosh\phi & -\sinh\phi & 0 & 0\\ -\sinh\phi & \cosh\phi & 0 & 0\\ 0&0&1&0\\ 0&0&0&1\\ \end{bmatrix} \begin{bmatrix} c\,t \\ x \\ y \\ z \end{bmatrix} ,$$

likewise for a boost in the y-direction

$$\begin{bmatrix} c t' \\ x' \\ y' \\ z' \end{bmatrix} = \begin{bmatrix} \cosh\phi & 0 & -\sinh\phi & 0\\ 0&1&0&0\\ -\sinh\phi &0& \cosh\phi &0\\ 0&0&0&1\\ \end{bmatrix} \begin{bmatrix} c\,t \\ x \\ y \\ z \end{bmatrix} ,$$

and the z-direction

$$\begin{bmatrix} c t' \\ x' \\ y' \\ z' \end{bmatrix} = \begin{bmatrix} \cosh\phi &0&0&-\sinh\phi\\ 0&1&0&0\\ 0&0&1&0\\ -\sinh\phi&0&0&\cosh\phi\\ \end{bmatrix} \begin{bmatrix} c\,t \\ x \\ y \\ z \end{bmatrix} \,.$$

where e_{x}, e_{y}, e_{z} are the Cartesian basis vectors, a set of mutually perpendicular unit vectors along their indicated directions. If one frame is boosted with velocity v relative to another, it is convenient to introduce a unit vector n = v/v = β/β in the direction of relative motion. The general boost is

$$\begin{bmatrix} c\,t' \\ x' \\ y' \\ z' \end{bmatrix} = \begin{bmatrix} \cosh\phi & -n_x\sinh\phi & -n_y\sinh\phi & -n_z\sinh\phi\\ -n_x\sinh\phi & 1+(\cosh\phi-1)n_x^2&(\cosh\phi-1)n_x n_y&(\cosh\phi-1)n_x n_z\\ -n_y\sinh\phi & (\cosh\phi-1)n_y n_x&1+(\cosh\phi-1)n_y^2&(\cosh\phi-1)n_y n_z\\ -n_z\sinh\phi & (\cosh\phi-1)n_z n_x&(\cosh\phi-1)n_z n_y&1+(\cosh\phi-1)n_z^2\\ \end{bmatrix} \begin{bmatrix} c\,t \\ x \\ y \\ z \end{bmatrix}\,.$$

Notice the matrix depends on the direction of the relative motion as well as the rapidity, in all three numbers (two for direction, one for rapidity).

We can cast each of the boost matrices in another form as follows. First consider the boost in the x direction. The Taylor expansion of the boost matrix about ϕ = 0 is

$$B(\mathbf{e}_x,\phi)=\sum_{n=0}^{\infty}\frac{\phi^n}{n!}\left.\frac{\partial^nB(\mathbf{e}_x,\phi)}{\partial\phi^n}\right|_{\phi=0}$$

where the derivatives of the matrix with respect to ϕ are given by differentiating each entry of the matrix separately, and the notation |_{ϕ = 0} indicates ϕ is set to zero after the derivatives are evaluated. Expanding to first order gives the infinitesimal transformation

$$B(\mathbf{e}_x,\phi)=I+\phi\left.\frac{\partial B}{\partial\phi}\right|_{\phi=0} =
\begin{bmatrix}
1 & 0 & 0 & 0\\
0 & 1 & 0 & 0\\
0 & 0 & 1 & 0\\
0 & 0 & 0 & 1
\end{bmatrix}-\phi
\begin{bmatrix}
0 & 1 & 0 & 0\\
1 & 0 & 0 & 0\\
0 & 0 & 0 & 0\\
0 & 0 & 0 & 0
\end{bmatrix}$$

which is valid if ϕ is small (hence ϕ^{2} and higher powers are negligible), and can be interpreted as no boost (the first term I is the 4×4 identity matrix), followed by a small boost. The matrix

$$K_x=\begin{bmatrix}0 & 1 & 0 & 0\\
1 & 0 & 0 & 0\\
0 & 0 & 0 & 0\\
0 & 0 & 0 & 0
\end{bmatrix}$$

is the generator of the boost in the x direction, so the infinitesimal boost is

$$B(\mathbf{e}_x,\phi)=I-\phi K_x$$

Now, ϕ is small, so dividing by a positive integer N gives an even smaller increment of rapidity ϕ/N, and N of these infinitesimal boosts will give the original infinitesimal boost with rapidity ϕ,

$$B(\mathbf{e}_x,\phi)=\left(I-\frac{\phi K_x}{N}\right)^N$$

In the limit of an infinite number of infinitely small steps, we obtain the finite boost transformation

$$B(\mathbf{e}_x,\phi)=\lim_{N\to\infty}\left(I-\frac{\phi K_x}{N}\right)^{N}=e^{-\phi K_x}$$

which is the limit definition of the exponential due to Leonhard Euler, and is now true for any ϕ.

Repeating the process for the boosts in the y and z directions obtains the other generators

$$K_y=\begin{bmatrix}0 & 0 & 1 & 0\\
0 & 0 & 0 & 0\\
1 & 0 & 0 & 0\\
0 & 0 & 0 & 0
\end{bmatrix}\,,\quad K_z=\begin{bmatrix}0 & 0 & 0 & 1\\
0 & 0 & 0 & 0\\
0 & 0 & 0 & 0\\
1 & 0 & 0 & 0
\end{bmatrix}$$

and the boosts are

$$B(\mathbf{e}_y,\phi)=e^{-\phi K_y}\,,\quad B(\mathbf{e}_z,\phi)=e^{-\phi K_z}\,.$$

For any direction, the infinitesimal transformation is (small ϕ and expansion to first order)

$$B(\mathbf{n},\phi)=I+\phi\left.\frac{\partial B}{\partial\phi}\right|_{\phi=0} =
\begin{bmatrix}
1 & 0 & 0 & 0\\
0 & 1 & 0 & 0\\
0 & 0 & 1 & 0\\
0 & 0 & 0 & 1
\end{bmatrix}-\phi\begin{bmatrix}0 & n_x & n_y & n_z\\
n_x & 0 & 0 & 0\\
n_y & 0 & 0 & 0\\
n_z & 0 & 0 & 0
\end{bmatrix}$$

where

$$\begin{bmatrix}0 & n_x & n_y & n_z\\
n_x & 0 & 0 & 0\\
n_y & 0 & 0 & 0\\
n_z & 0 & 0 & 0
\end{bmatrix} = n_x K_x + n_y K_y + n_z K_z = \mathbf{n}\cdot\mathbf{K}$$

is the generator of the boost in direction n. It is the full boost generator, a vector of matrices K = (K_{x}, K_{y}, K_{z}), projected into the direction of the boost n. The infinitesimal boost is

$$B(\mathbf{n},\phi)=I-\phi(\mathbf{n}\cdot\mathbf{K})$$

Then in the limit of an infinite number of infinitely small steps, we obtain the finite boost transformation

$$B(\mathbf{n},\phi)=\lim_{N\to\infty}\left(I-\frac{\phi(\mathbf{n}\cdot\mathbf{K})}{N}\right)^{N}=e^{-\phi(\mathbf{n}\cdot\mathbf{K})}$$

which is now true for any ϕ. Expanding the matrix exponential of −ϕ(n ⋅ K) in its power series

$$e^{-\phi\mathbf{n}\cdot\mathbf{K}} = \sum_{n=0}^{\infty}\frac{1}{n!}(-\phi \mathbf{n}\cdot\mathbf{K})^n$$

we now need the powers of the generator. The square is

$$(\mathbf{n}\cdot\mathbf{K})^2=\begin{bmatrix}1 & 0 & 0 & 0\\
0 & n_x^2 & n_x n_y & n_x n_z\\
0 & n_y n_x & n_y^2 & n_y n_z\\
0 & n_z n_x & n_z n_y & n_z^2
\end{bmatrix}$$

but the cube (n ⋅ K)^{3} returns to (n ⋅ K), and as always the zeroth power is the 4×4 identity, (n ⋅ K)^{0} = I. In general the odd powers n = 1, 3, 5, ... are

$$(\mathbf{n}\cdot\mathbf{K})^n = (\mathbf{n}\cdot\mathbf{K})$$

while the even powers n = 2, 4, 6, ... are

$$(\mathbf{n}\cdot\mathbf{K})^n = (\mathbf{n}\cdot\mathbf{K})^2$$

therefore the explicit form of the boost matrix depends only the generator and its square. Splitting the power series into an odd power series and an even power series, using the odd and even powers of the generator, and the Taylor series of sinh ϕ and cosh ϕ about ϕ = 0 obtains a more compact but detailed form of the boost matrix

$$\begin{align}
e^{-\phi\mathbf{n}\cdot\mathbf{K}}& = -\sum_{n=1,3,5\ldots}^{\infty}\frac{1}{n!}\phi^n(\mathbf{n}\cdot\mathbf{K})^n+\sum_{n=0,2,4\ldots}^{\infty} \frac{1}{n!}\phi^n(\mathbf{n}\cdot\mathbf{K})^n\\
& = - \left[\phi+\frac{\phi^3}{3!}+\frac{\phi^5}{5!} +\cdots \right] (\mathbf{n}\cdot\mathbf{K}) + I +\left[ -1 + 1 + \frac{1}{2!} \phi^2+\frac{1}{4!}\phi^4 +\frac{1}{6!}\phi^6 +\cdots\right](\mathbf{n}\cdot\mathbf{K})^2 \\
& = - \sinh\phi(\mathbf{n}\cdot\mathbf{K}) + I +(-1+\cosh\phi)(\mathbf{n}\cdot\mathbf{K})^2
\end{align}$$

where 0 = −1 + 1 is introduced for the even power series to complete the Taylor series for cosh ϕ. The boost is similar to Rodrigues' rotation formula,

$$B(\mathbf{n},\phi) = e^{-\phi\mathbf{n}\cdot\mathbf{K}} = I -\sinh\phi(\mathbf{n}\cdot\mathbf{K})+(\cosh\phi-1)(\mathbf{n}\cdot\mathbf{K})^2 \,.$$

Negating the rapidity in the exponential gives the inverse transformation matrix,

$$B(\mathbf{n},-\phi) = e^{\phi\mathbf{n}\cdot\mathbf{K}} = I +\sinh\phi(\mathbf{n}\cdot\mathbf{K})+(\cosh\phi-1)(\mathbf{n}\cdot\mathbf{K})^2 \,.$$

In quantum mechanics, relativistic quantum mechanics, and quantum field theory, a different convention is used for the boost generators; all of the boost generators are multiplied by a factor of the imaginary unit i = √−1.

== From experiments ==
Howard Percy Robertson and others showed that the Lorentz transformation can also be derived empirically. In order to achieve this, it's necessary to write down coordinate transformations that include experimentally testable parameters. For instance, let there be given a single "preferred" inertial frame $X, Y, Z, T$ in which the speed of light is constant, isotropic, and independent of the velocity of the source. It is also assumed that Einstein synchronization and synchronization by slow clock transport are equivalent in this frame. Then assume another frame $x, y, z, t$ in relative motion, in which clocks and rods have the same internal constitution as in the preferred frame. The following relations, however, are left undefined:

- $a(v)$ differences in time measurements,
- $b(v)$ differences in measured longitudinal lengths,
- $d(v)$ differences in measured transverse lengths,
- $\varepsilon(v)$ depends on the clock synchronization procedure in the moving frame,

then the transformation formulas (assumed to be linear) between those frames are given by:

$$\begin{align}
t & =a(v)T+\varepsilon(v) x\\
x & =b(v)(X-vT)\\
y & =d(v)Y\\
z & =d(v)Z
\end{align}$$

$\varepsilon (v)$ depends on the synchronization convention and is not determined experimentally, it obtains the value $-v/c^{2}$ by using Einstein synchronization in both frames. The ratio between $b(v)$ and $d(v)$ is determined by the Michelson–Morley experiment, the ratio between $a(v)$ and $b(v)$ is determined by the Kennedy–Thorndike experiment, and $a(v)$ alone is determined by the Ives–Stilwell experiment. In this way, they have been determined with great precision to $1/a(v)=b(v)=\gamma$ and $d(v)=1$, which converts the above transformation into the Lorentz transformation.

== See also ==
- Lorentz group
- Noether's theorem
- Poincaré group
- Proper time
- Relativistic metric
- Spinor
