= Ksenia Lukyanchikova =

Russian actress

- Ксения Эдуардовна Лукьянчикова
- Born: 15 January 1993 (age 33); Saint Petersburg, Russia
- Citizenship: Russia
- Education: Russian State Institute of Performing Arts
- Occupation: Actress
- Years active: 2014–present

Ksenia Eduardovna Lukyanchikova (born 15 January 1993 in St. Petersburg; (Russian: Ксения Эдуардовна Лукьянчикова) is a Russian theatre and film actress.

== Biography ==
Ksenia Lukyanchikova was born on January 15, 1993, in Saint Petersburg. At school she studied in the children's and youth theater studio. The actress's father, Eduard Viktorovich Lukyanchikov, works in the municipal fire department, and her mother, Natalya Anatolyevna Lukyanchikova, is a music teacher. While studying at the theater academy, Lukyanchikova took part in many performances. She played roles in such classic productions as Uncle Vanya (Russian: Дядя Ваня), King Lear (Russian: Король Лир), and Drama on the Hunt (Russian: Драма на охоте). In 2015, she graduated from the Russian State Institute of Performing Arts with a degree in theater and film artist. After graduation, Lukyanchikova moved to Moscow and soon began working at the Moscow Praktika Theater.

Since 2014 she has been acting in films, and since 2015 she has been collaborating with the Praktika Theatre in Moscow. The actress's debut in cinema, which brought her fame, was the main role in the multi-part feature film directed by Alyona Semyonova, The Red Queen, in which Lukyanchikova played the popular Soviet fashion model Regina Barskaya (character is based on Regina Zbarskaya). Ksenia's partners in the series were Ada Rohovtseva, Boris Shcherbakov, Artyom Tkachenko, Elena Morozova, Valery Barinov and other actors.

She played in the Educational theater "On Mokhovaya" in Saint Petersburg.

This was followed by roles in the TV series: Such Work (Russian: Такая работа), Wings of the Empire (Russian: Крылья империи), Fantasy of White Nights (Russian: Фантазия белых ночей), Magomayev (Russian: Магомаев) and Alien (Russian: Чужая).

According to Ksenia, music is an important part of her life. Her favorite actresses and examples of acting skills, who largely inspired her to choose a profession, are Tatiana Samoilova and Elina Bystritskaya[3]. In 2017, at the Vyacheslav Tikhonov International Film Festival “17 Moments...”, the actress was awarded the award in the category “Best Actress in a TV Series.”

From 2015 to 2018 she was in a relationship with actor Ivan Zhvakin.
