= Lev Zbarsky =

- Born: Felix-Lev Borisovich Zbarsky; 12 November 1931; Moscow, Soviet Union
- Died: 22 February 2016 (aged 84); New York City, United States
- Occupation: Painter

Felix-Lev Borisovich Zbarsky (Russian: Феликс-Лев Борисович Збарский; 12 November 1931 – 22 February 2016) was a Soviet Jewish painter. He was born in Moscow, the son of a biochemist Boris Zbarsky. Biochemist Ilya Zbarsky was his brother, and he was the first husband of the actress Lyudmila Maksakova. He was also a husband of the Soviet model Regina Zbarskaya.

== Biography ==
Lev Zbarsky was the first son of the second marriage of Boris Ilyich Zbarsky with Evgenia Perelman. Lev was born in Moscow in November 1931. The father decided to call his son the name of the man he most respected. Since there were two men he respected most, Lev Karpov and Felix Dzerzhinsky, the son was given a double name Felix-Lev.

In 1972, Lev Zbarsky emigrated to Israel, and from there he moved to the United States. He died in New York from lung cancer in 2016.
