= Red Empire =

Red Empire may refer to

- 7th Special Forces Group (United States), a brigade-sized United States Army unit
- Empire of Japan, known as the "Red Empire of the Pacific", existing from 1868 to 1947
- Red Empire (game), a card game published by Game Designers' Workshop in 1990
- The Red Empire, a 2011 book by Joe McKinney

== See also ==
- Red Emperor (disambiguation)
