= Denis Voronenkov =

Russian politician (1971–2017)

- Денис Вороненков
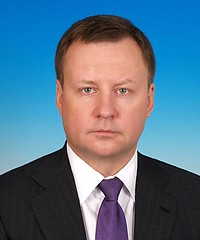

Member of the State Duma
- In office 21 December 2011 – 5 October 2016

Personal details
- Born: 10 April 1971 Gorky, Russian SFSR, Soviet Union
- Died: 23 March 2017 (aged 45) Kyiv, Ukraine
- Cause of death: Assassination by gunshots
- Party: Unity (2000–2003); Independent (2003–2011; 2016–2017); Communist Party of the Russian Federation (2011–2016)
- Spouse: Maria Maksakova Jr. (m. 2015)
- Children: 3
- Awards: Medal "For Distinguished Service to the Drug Control Authorities", 3rd degree (2006)

Military service
- Allegiance: Soviet Union; Russia
- Branch/service: Soviet Army; Russian Ground Forces
- Years of service: 1988–1999
- Rank: Colonel

Denis Nikolayevich Voronenkov (Russian: Денис Николаевич Вороненков, IPA: [dʲɪˈnʲis vərɐˈnʲɛnkəf]; 10 April 1971 – 23 March 2017) was a Russian politician who served as a member of the State Duma from 2011 to 2016. He was a member of the Unity party from 2000 to 2003 and the Communist Party of the Russian Federation from 2011 to 2016.

Voronenkov was born in Gorky, Russian SFSR. He studied at the Suvorov Military School before joining the Soviet Army. In 1999, he left the military to begin a career in politics. In 2001, he became an advisor to the Supreme Court of the Russian Federation, then being selected as the Deputy Mayor of Naryan-Mar and Deputy Governor of Nenets Autonomous District. Voronenkov then joined the Communist Party and was elected to the State Duma in 2011. In the 2016 legislative election he lost his seat to United Russia candidate Vladimir Panov.

The following month, Voronenkov renounced his Russian citizenship and emigrated to Ukraine with his wife, Maria Maksakova Jr. There he became a vocal critic of Russian president, Vladimir Putin, and Russian foreign policy. Although as a member of the State Duma, he had voted for Russia's annexation of Crimea, while in Ukraine he argued that the annexation had been illegal. In early 2017, the Investigative Committee of Russia opened a case to look into Voronenkov's suspected corruption, and an investigation by the anti-corruption blogger and Russian opposition figure Alexei Navalny found that Voronenkov possessed significantly more assets than his officially-declared income would allow.

Voronenkov was shot dead in Kyiv by a Ukrainian national, Pavlo Parshov. Ukrainian prosecutors believe that it had been a contract killing (arranged by an FSB officer) while the country's then-president, Petro Poroshenko, alleged that it had been orchestrated by the Russian government.

== Personal life and family ==
Denis Nikolayevich Voronenkov was born in Gorky (now Nizhny Novgorod), Russian SFSR, but had a Ukrainian grandmother and (according to his widow) spent his childhood in Ukraine's Kherson Oblast. Voronenkov married former fellow Russian MP and opera singer Maria Maksakova Jr. in March 2015. The couple met while working on a bill regulating the export of cultural artifacts. Each of them had two children from previous relationships. Their son was born in April 2016. Voronenkov's first two children are his daughter Xenia (b. 2000) and his son Nikolay from his first marriage with Yulia. The Ukrainian journalist Kostyantyn Doroshenko published the book «Aria of Mary» a biography of Maria Maksakova and her life with Voronenkov (2021).

== Education ==
As the son of a serviceman, Voronenkov won a place in the Leningrad Suvorov Military School, from which he graduated in 1988 and then immediately joined the Soviet Army. In 1995 he completed a diploma level officers course at the Military University of the Ministry of Defence of the Russian Federation, prior to his transfer to the Military Prosecutor's Office of the Russian Federation. In 1996 he did another course at the Faculty of Law of Ryazan State University. In 1999, at the Moscow Academy of the Ministry of Internal Affairs for the Russian Federation he successfully defended his thesis for the Degree of Candidate for Legal Sciences, titled 'Legal Nihilism and Legal Idealism (Theoretical and Legal Research)', Doctor of Law. In 2009 he defended his thesis on 'Theoretical and normative basis of judicial control in the mechanism of separation of powers', at the Russian Legal Academy of the Ministry of Justice of the Russian Federation.

== Career ==
Voronenkov eventually came to hold the rank of colonel in the Russian army. He had worked in military and federal law enforcement since 1995, joining the Military Prosecutor's Office of the Russian Federation, initially as an investigator. (Note: During this period the Military Prosecutor's Office was acting as the de facto military police of the Russian Armed Forces, with some assistance from ministry of internal affairs OMON units.) He had reached the position of deputy prosecutor by the time he left the military in 1999 in order to enter politics. In 2000 Voronenkov became an employee for the State Duma faction of the Unity party. In 2001 he became an advisor of the Supreme Court of the Russian Federation before becoming the Deputy Mayor of Naryan-Mar and Deputy Governor of Nenets Autonomous District. Voronenkov then worked for the Federal Drug Control Service of Russia from 2004 until 2007. (Note: Apparently with the permanent rank of major but an acting rank of colonel.) He then pursued an academic career as an associate professor; his last post before being elected an MP was (from February 2010) at the St. Petersburg Institute of International Trade, Economics and Law.

=== Political career ===
Voronenkov was elected as a deputy for the Communist Party of the Russian Federation in the State Duma, the lower house of the Russian parliament, in 2011.

Voronenkov lost his bid for reelection in September 2016, taking third place (13.99%) in constituency No.129, located in his native Nizhny Novgorod Oblast, well behind the winner, United Russia candidate Vladimir Panov (42.39%). He stepped down from the State Duma in October. Later that month, Voronenkov announced that he had given up his Russian citizenship and left for Ukraine, where he was naturalized as a Ukrainian citizen in December. Voronenkov said that he had no intention of entering Ukrainian politics. He was expelled from the Communist Party in 2016.

After he moved to Ukraine, he became known as a sharp critic of Russian president Vladimir Putin and Russian policy towards Ukraine. Before stepping down as an MP in Russia, he had however taken part in the parliamentary vote to annex Crimea from Ukraine, for which he was criticised in Ukraine. Although his vote was registered, he stated that he was not present in parliament on that day. In 2014 he had also voiced support for the breakaway regions of Novorossiya in the east of Ukraine, which added to the criticism of him in Ukraine. In 2017 he was however an outspoken critic of Russian intervention in Ukraine and elsewhere, e.g. in Transnistria, Abkhazia and South Ossetia. In an interview with Radio Free Europe/Radio Liberty in February 2017, Voronenkov compared Russia under Vladimir Putin to Nazi Germany and called the Russian annexation of Crimea both illegal and a mistake. He described the atmosphere in Russia as characterised by a "pseudo-patriotic frenzy" and "total fear". At the time of his death, he had been due to testify against former Ukrainian president Viktor Yanukovych.

According to Voronenkov, he was persecuted in Russia by the Federal Security Service whom he accused of being involved in drug trafficking. In October 2016 the Russian Prosecutor-General's Office refused to launch a probe against Voronenkov recommended by the Investigative Committee of Russia. Nevertheless, Voronenkov was accused later of being involved in an illegal property seizure (worth 127 million rubles) in Moscow. Russian investigators were preparing a criminal case against Voronenkov, but were waiting for his parliamentary immunity to run out in December 2016. In March 2017 a court in Moscow had sanctioned Voronenkov's arrest in absentia. Voronenkov himself dismissed the Russian accusations as politically motivated and stated that the Federal Security Service had offered him to write off the accusations against him if he would pay them US$3 million.

Voronenkov has been accused by Alexei Navalny and the Anti-Corruption Foundation of using ill-gotten wealth to buy extensive property and automotive holdings worth hundreds of millions of rubles. Voronenkov had multiple properties including a luxury villa worth 300 million rubles, which his annual parliamentary salary of 3 million rubles (his highest ever reported income), given that he has only ever worked in the Russian government, could scarcely have afforded him.

== Death ==
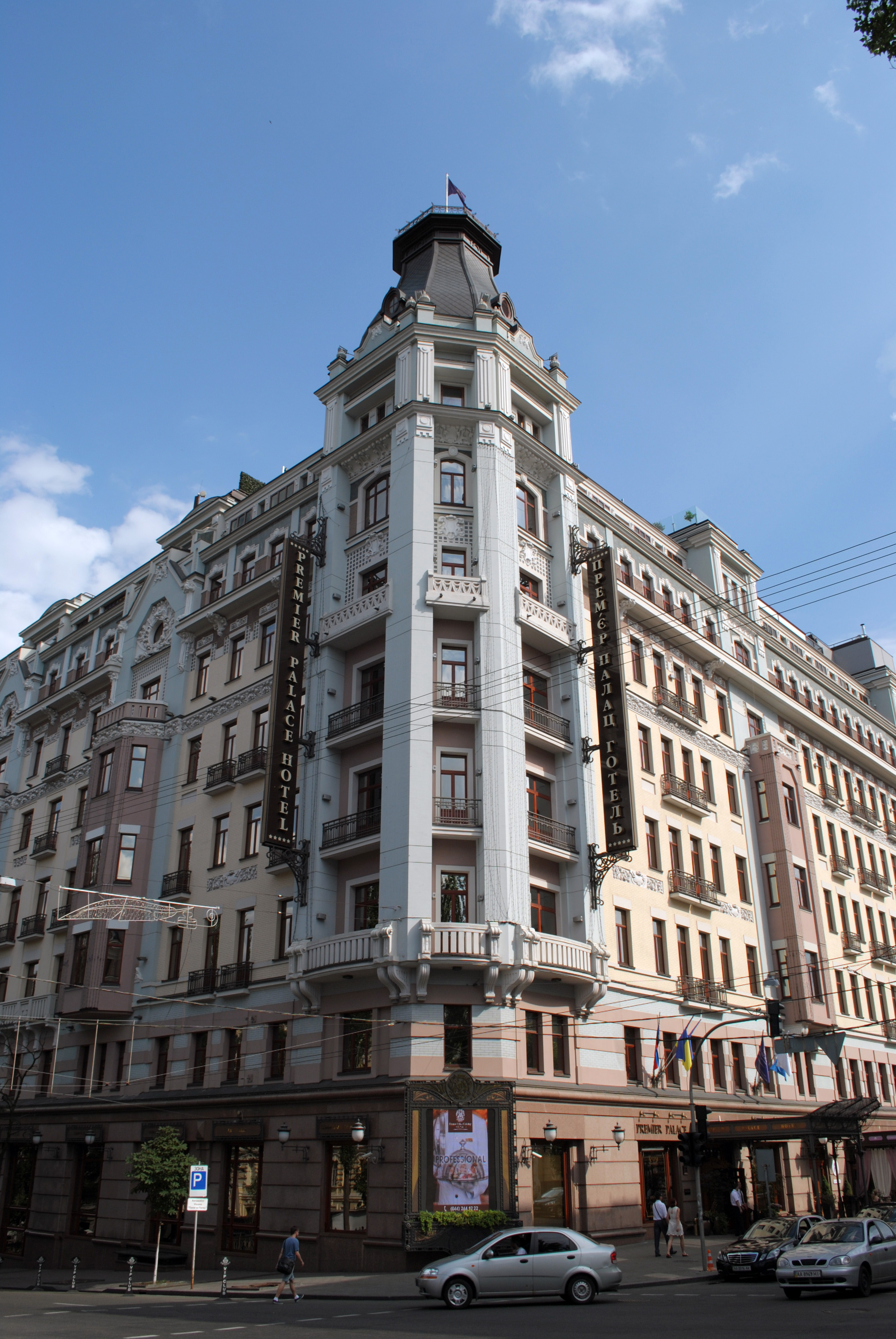
The building of Premier Palace hotel in Kyiv, where the assassination of Voronenkov took place

Voronenkov was shot dead in Kyiv as he left the Premier Palace hotel on 23 March 2017. Ukraine's General Prosecutor Yuriy Lutsenko stated that Voronenkov was shot at least three times, including in the head, and died instantly. He was on his way to meet Ilya Ponomarev, another former Russian MP living in exile in Ukraine (the only MP to vote against the annexation of Crimea). His assailant was wounded by Voronenkov's bodyguard (who was provided by the Ukrainian Security Service) and taken to a hospital, where he later died from his wounds, according to the authorities. The gunman carried a Ukrainian passport and had been sought by the police on fraud and money laundering charges, according to the General Prosecutor of Ukraine. Anton Herashchenko, an official with Ukraine's Interior Ministry and a Ukrainian lawmaker said that the name of the gunman was Pavlo Parshov, a Ukrainian citizen and veteran of Ukraine's volunteer paramilitary unit. He also said that Parshov was planted by Russian services as an undercover agent into the National Guard of Ukraine. A police spokesman said the murder was likely a contract killing. Voronenkov's bodyguard was also wounded during the incident.

The president of Ukraine Petro Poroshenko reacted to the murder by calling it an act of Russian "state terrorism". Russian President Vladimir Putin's spokesman, Dmitry Peskov denied being involved and called the claims "absurd". Several other officials also dismissed involvement. Russian MP and former Director of the Russian Federal Security Service Nikolay Kovalyov said to Russian TV that he believed the murder may be linked to a business dispute. Ponomarev reacted to the murder by stating: "I have no words. The security guard was able to injure the attacker. The potential theory is obvious. Voronenkov was not a crook, but an investigator who was fatally dangerous to Russian authorities." Lutsenko called the murder a "typical show execution of a witness by the Kremlin."

A little more than a month before his murder, Voronenkov said that he feared for his own and his family's security, and that he had been "poking a sore spot of the Kremlin" with his criticism of the Russian president. In a March 2017 interview, he referred to "demonization" in Russia and stated, "The system has lost its mind. They say we are traitors in Russia. And I say, 'Who did we betray?"

In 2019 The New York Times Magazine reported that Voronenkov's death was likely to have been related to him benefiting on his co-conspirators in a case of corporate raiding.

=== Investigation ===
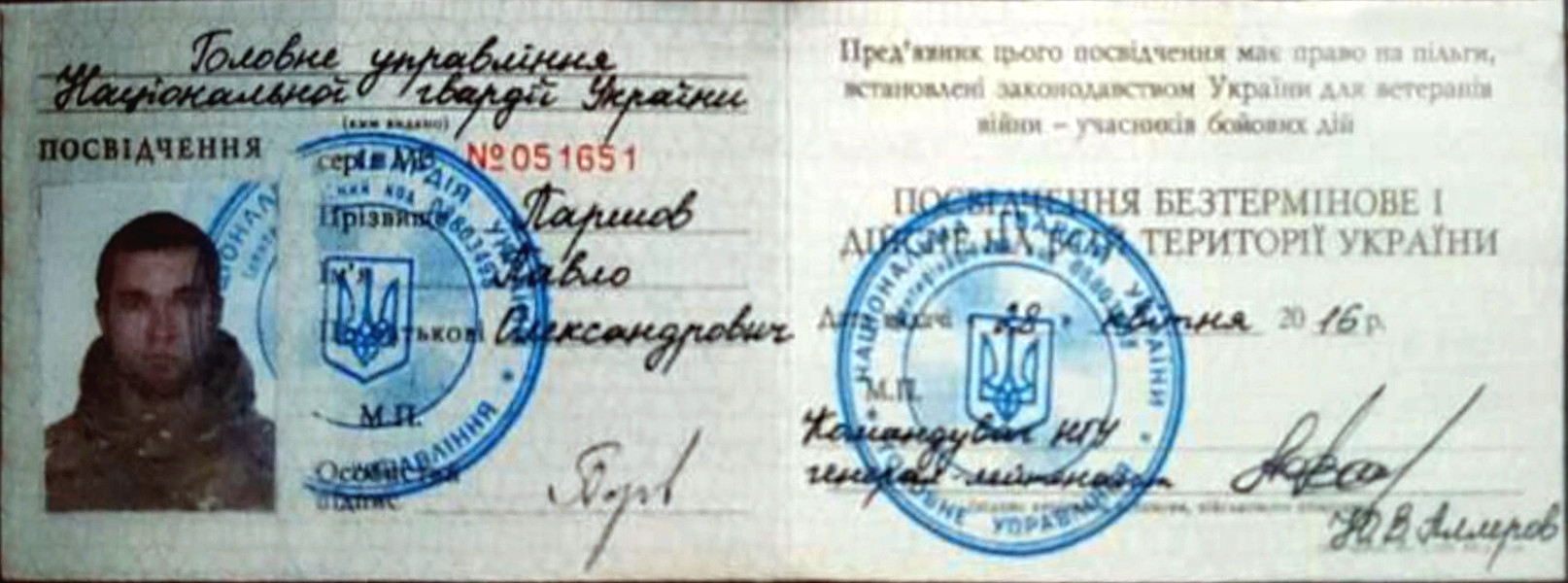
Pavlo Parshov's papers issued by UNG.

In March 2017 the Ukrainian National Guard (UNG) identified the perpetrator of the crime as Pavlo Parshov (Ukrainian: Павло Паршов), a 28-year-old far-right Ukrainian nationalist and former member of the National Guard who was previously suspected in a money-laundering case. He died in custody in intensive care unit from wounds sustained at the scene. His nom de guerre was the Boxer.

Also in march 2017 Ukrainian MIA placed on its wanted list Parshov's suspected co-conspirator Yaroslav Levenets (Ukrainian: Ярослав Левенец) who previously fought in the war in Donbas in the far-right nationalist Right Sector group and had history of arrests for various crimes in the past. Just only eight days before the murder he was detained by law enforcers for illegal weapon possession and was subsequently released. Because he failed to appear for questioning as a suspect, a warrant for his arrest was issued on August 2017. In May 2023, law enforcement authorities requested an extension of the warrant because the suspect’s whereabouts remained unknown. The District Court in Kyiv denied the request to extend the warrant because the suspect was serving in the military, had been awarded the Order of Bogdan Khmelnytsky, 3rd Class, and had received a Ukrainian passport in Dnipro in September 2022. In summer 2025 he took command of the 1st Mechanized Battalion of the Azov-linked 3rd Separate Assault Brigade.

In September 2017 Ukrainian prosecutor's office announced that Vladimir Tyurin (a thief in law who was in relationship with Maria Maksakova Jr. before she married Voronenkov) was hired by Oleg Feoktistov (Russian: Олег Феоктистов), a Russian FSB officer, to organize the assassination of Voronenkov. The latter was said to be at odds with Feoktistov. The investigation did not provide any evidence.

== See also ==
- List of unsolved murders (2000–present)
