= Red Emperor (disambiguation) =

The Red Emperor or Red Deity (赤帝 Chìdì) was a legendary ancient Chinese ruler in pre-dynastic times.

Red Emperor or red emperor may also refer to:

- Emperor (grape), a red grape variety also known as Red Emperor
- Lutjanus sebae, a species of fish, also known as red emperor
- Mao Zedong (1893–1976), Chairman of the Chinese Communist Party, sometimes called the Red Emperor
- Lal Baadshah (lit. 'Red Emperor'), a 1999 Indian Hindi-language film
- "Red Emperor", a cultivar of the tulip Tulipa fosteriana

== See also ==
- Red King (disambiguation)
- Red Empire (disambiguation)
