= The Red Queen (miniseries) =

- Krasnaya koroleva
- Starring: Ksenia Lukyanchikova
- Countries of origin: Russia; Ukraine
- Original language: Russian

Production
- Production companies: FILM.UA Group; Shpil Studio

Original release
- Network: Channel One; Inter
- Release: 2015 – 2015

The Red Queen (Красная королева, Krasnaya koroleva) is a twelve-episode biographical drama produced in 2015 by the Kyiv-based FILM.UA Group in partnership with Moscow's Shpil Studio for first-run broadcast on Russia's Channel One and Ukraine's Inter.

== Synopsis ==
The narrative re-imagines the life of Soviet super-model Regina Zbarskaya—fictionalised here as Zoya Kolesnikova/Regina Barskaya—tracing her escape from provincial Vologda after a domestic tragedy in 1953, through fame on European catwalks, to her eventual psychological collapse.

== Production ==
The series was directed by Alena Semenova from a screenplay by Elena Boyko and Maria Bek, photographed by Alexander Smirnov and designed by art directors Yuri Grigorovich and Alexander Tolkachyov. Although the action is set largely in 1950s–1970s Moscow, principal photography took place on the FILM.UA back-lot in Kyiv, with additional exterior work in Saint Petersburg and the pavilions of VDNKh that once housed Soviet fashion-house exhibitions.

== Cast ==
- Ksenia Lukyanchikova as Regina Barskaya (the character is inspired by Regina Zbarskaya)
- Artyom Tkachenko as Lev Barsky
- Boris Shcherbakov as a senior Party functionary
- Anatoly Rudenko as Viktor

== Awards and reception ==
Critic Caitlin O’Conner praised the “kick-in-the-gut ending that lays bare the cost of beauty under a strict Soviet regime”. Ukrainian Detector Media argued that the lush costuming and nostalgic set-design risked romanticising the late-Soviet period, framing the drama as part of “a Russian television trend of portraying the USSR in pastel, almost Edenic tones”.

Internationally the miniseries won the Silver Screen Award for Best Television Series at the 49th US International Film & Video Festival in Los Angeles in 2016. At Ukraine's national Teletriumf awards the same year, it received nominations for Best Drama Series and Best Actress. In April 2017 the drama took Best Series and earned Ksenia Lukyanchikova Best Actress at the inaugural International Film Festival “17 Moments…” in Pavlovsky Posad, Russia.
