= Red King =

Red King may refer to:

- Red king crab, a species of king crab
- The red King playing card
- Red King (Ultra monster), a foe of the Japanese superhero Ultraman
- Red King (comics), a number of comics characters of the same name
- William II of England, commonly known as William "Rufus", or "The Red King"
- Rory "Red King" MacDonald, a Canadian MMA fighter
- The Red King (novel), a children's book by author Victor Kelleher
- The Red King (TV series), a 2024 British crime drama television series
- Red King (Through the Looking-Glass), a character in the Lewis Carroll novel Through the Looking-Glass
- Lal Baadshah (lit. 'Red King'), a 1999 Indian Hindi-language film
- An ancient king whose descendants are the main characters in Children of the Red King series of books by Jenny Nimmo
- Another name for the Crimson King from the works of Stephen King

== See also ==
- Red Queen (disambiguation)
- Red Emperor (disambiguation)
- Red King hypothesis, a cooperative evoluionary theory, in contrast to the Red Queen hypothesis
