= Regina Zbarskaya =

Soviet model (1935–1987)

- Регина Збарская
- Born: 25 September 1935; Vologda or Leningrad
- Died: 15 November 1987 (aged 52); Moscow
- Citizenship: Soviet Union
- Education: Gerasimov Institute of Cinematography
- Occupations: Model, actress

Regina Nikolaevna Zbarskaya (Russian: Регина Николаевна Збарская) (born 27 September 1935, Vologda (according to another source - Leningrad) - died 15 November 1987 in Moscow) was a Soviet fashion model. She became world famous in the early 1960s. She gained great fame in Paris, where she was called "the most beautiful weapon of the Kremlin". She was also known by the nickname "the Soviet Sophia Loren".

== Biography ==
There are two versions regarding the place of birth of Zbarskaya and her parents. Those who knew Zbarskaya personally claimed that she was born in Vologda, where her mother, Daria Tikhonovna Kolesnikova, worked as a doctor, and her father, Nikolai Dementievich Kolesnikov, was a retired officer.

In 1953, seventeen-year-old Regina Kolesnikova came to Moscow and entered the Faculty of Economics at Gerasimov Institute of Cinematography. While studying, she began to appear at bohemian parties, where one day she was noticed by fashion designer Vera Aralova. It was from this meeting that Kolesnikova's modeling career began. The French magazine Paris Match called her "the most beautiful weapon of the Kremlin". And when Vyacheslav Zaitsev cut Zbarskaya's pageboy hair and created the image of an “Italian beauty,” Zbarskaya was dubbed the “Soviet Sophia Loren” in the Western press

In 1958, she starred in the film The Sailor from the Comet (Russian: Матрос с «Кометы») as the Italian singer Silvanna (credited as R. Kolesnikova).

Zbarskaya's only husband was the Moscow artist Lev Zbarsky, the son of the scientist Boris Zbarsky, the marriage took place in the early 1960s. In 1967, Zbarskaya became pregnant, but her husband did not want children, she decided to have an abortion, after which she tried to suppress her feelings of guilt with antidepressants. At this time, Zbarsky became interested in actress Marianna Vertinskaya, and then went to Lyudmila Maksakova, who gave birth to his son in 1970. After this, Zbarskaya was admitted to a psychiatric hospital with signs of severe depression.

Soviet illegal intelligence officer Vitaly Shlykov claimed in an interview that he lived with Zbarskaya for one year in her apartment, and during the period when she was still officially married, but no longer lived with her husband. It was during this period that one of Zbarskaya's suicide attempts occurred by cutting herself with nail scissors. Shlykov named the main reason for the suicide attempt as severe stress after an attempt to recruit the model by KGB officers through blackmail. Also in his memoirs, he categorically rejected the speculation that he encountered in various sources that Zbarskaya worked for the KGB, helping to collect the necessary data for this department in various ways.

After leaving the hospital, Zbarskaya, with the help of the deputy director of the Model House, Elena Stepanovna Vorobey, returned to the podium. She began dating a young Yugoslav journalist who used her to achieve his own fame. Soon, under his authorship, a book was published in German, “One Hundred Nights with Regina Zbarskaya,” which describes erotic scenes, and also contains information about Zbarskaya's alleged connections with members of the Central Committee and denunciations of other fashion models.

After the political scandal, Zbarskaya tried to commit suicide three times; she succeeded on the third attempt and died from sleeping pills poisoning on November 15, 1987, at the age of 52.

There is also a version that Regina Zbarskaya died at home and not in the hospital. According to this version, she was found dead in the apartment with a telephone receiver in her hands. Colleagues from the House of Models (Russian: Общесоюзный дом моделей одежды) did not come to her funeral; her body was cremated. The circumstances of her death remain mysterious, and her burial place remains unknown. According to one version, she was buried in Vologda next to her father and aunt.

Vyacheslav Zaitsev in an interview with Ogoniok magazine said about her:

Regina Zbarskaya was not just a stunning beauty, but also smart. She has a tragic fate. But I always adored her. I took her to the House of Models as a “type figure” - a fashion model on whom they did fittings. She also worked simply as a cleaner. I supported her in every possible way until the very end.

Her character was played by Ksenia Lukyanchikova at the serial The Red Queen.
