= Red King (comics) =

Red King, in comics, may refer to:

- Red King (DC Comics), a DC Comics supervillain
- Marvel Comics characters:
  - Red King (Marvel Comics), a leading character in Planet Hulk
  - Alan Wilson, a member of the London branch of the Hellfire Club, where the Red King rank is equivalent to the White King
  - The Red King (webtoon)

== See also ==
- Red King (disambiguation)
- Red Queen (comics)
