= The Red Queen's Race =

- Short story by Isaac Asimov
- Country: United States
- Language: English
- Genre: Science fiction

Publication
- Published in: Astounding Science Fiction
- Publisher: Street & Smith
- Media type: Magazine
- Publication date: January 1949

"The Red Queen's Race" is a science fiction short story by American writer Isaac Asimov; it uses the Red Queen's race from Lewis Carroll's Through the Looking-Glass as a metaphor for the final plot twist. The story also makes reference to Asimov's psychohistory. "The Red Queen's Race" was first published in the January 1949 issue of Astounding Science Fiction and reprinted in the 1972 collection The Early Asimov.

"The Red Queen's Race" was written in July 1948, a month after Asimov received a PhD from Columbia University and became a postdoc studying anti-malarial drugs.

== Plot summary ==
The story is told by an unnamed narrator, an agent of an unnamed U.S. intelligence bureau. The agent is tasked with an investigation into an atomic power plant which has been completely drained of power. A Professor of Nuclear Physics, Elmer Tywood, is found dead.

As the investigation progresses, bringing in Tywood's research students and his university colleagues, it is revealed that Tywood had developed a means to send objects back in time via "micro-temporal translation." His plan was to "improve" the world by giving Hellenic Greece advanced knowledge in the form of chemistry.

The investigating agents and their superior, The Boss, gradually realize that the changes introduced into history might, through the butterfly effect, cause the deletion from existence of every human being alive.

The trail eventually leads to the doorstep of Mycroft James Boulder, Assistant Professor of Philosophy, who had been hired by Tywood to translate a textbook of chemistry into Attic Greek. He states that he had figured out Tywood's plan and translated only enough to coincide with historical accounts. As Boulder says after referencing the Red Queen, he worked fast and his "only intention, for all my racing, was to stay in the same place."

With no clear solution, the investigation is shelved and filed under the heading of "?".
