= Invariant speed =

Concept in relativistic physics

The invariant speed or observer invariant speed is a speed which is measured to be the same in all reference frames by all observers. The invariance of the speed of light is one of the postulates of special relativity, and the terms speed of light and invariant speed are often considered synonymous. In non-relativistic classical mechanics, or Newtonian mechanics, finite invariant speed does not exist (the only invariant speed predicted by Newtonian mechanics is infinity).

== See also ==
- Variable speed of light
- Red Queen's race
- Minkowski diagram
- Speed of gravity
