= Red Queen (comics) =

Red Queen, in comics, may refer to:

- Marvel Comics characters:
  - Members of the London branch of the Hellfire Club, where the rank is equivalent to White Queen:
    - Margali Szardos
    - Psylocke, in the Days of Future Past timeline
  - Red Queen, Hank Pym's daughter Hope Pym from the MC2 universe who is a supervillain and member of the Revengers
  - Red Queen (Jean Grey), an evil version of Jean Grey from Earth-9575 who replaced Pryor and ruled Earth-998
  - Red Queen (Madelyne Pryor), the alias used since her return to Marvel Comics
- The Red Queen, an alias used by Martha Kent to disrupt the Checkmate organization on the television series Smallville
- Blood Red Queen, a character who appeared in the "Vengeance of Vampirella" storyline

== See also ==
- Red Queen (disambiguation)
- Red King (comics)
