= Maximilian Maksakov =

Russian opera singer

Maksimilian Karlovich Maksakov
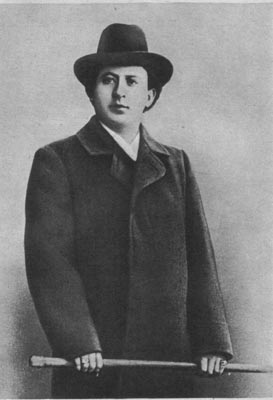
- Maksimilian Maksakov
- Born: Max Schwartz; 1869; Czernowitz, Duchy of Bukovina, Austria-Hungary
- Died: 26 March 1936; Moscow, USSR
- Occupation(s): Opera singer, theatre director, music professor
- Spouse: Maria Maksakova

Maksimilian Karlovich Maksakov (Максимилиа′н Ка′рлович Макса′ков, also known as Max Maksakov, real name Max Schwartz; 1869 in Chernivtsi, Duchy of Bukovina, Austria-Hungary — March 26, 1936 in Moscow, USSR) — was an Austrian/Russian opera singer (dramatic baritone) and music teacher. As a theater director, entrepreneur and later Russian Academy of Theatre Arts professor, Maksakov has made a considerable impact on the development of performance arts in Russia, especially in the province. His best known protégé was a renowned Soviet mezzo-soprano Maria Maksakova Sr. whom he married in 1920.
