= Maria Maksakova (mezzo-soprano, born 1902) =

Maria Maksakova Sr.
- Maksakova as Carmen
- Born: Maria Petrovna Sidorova; April 8, 1902; Astrakhan, Russian Empire
- Died: August 11, 1974 (aged 72); Moscow, Soviet Union
- Occupations: opera singer (mezzo-soprano); vocal pedagogue
- Years active: 1923–1974
- Spouse: Yakov Davyatyn
- Awards: People's Artist of the USSR

Maria Petrovna Maksakova (Russian: Мария Петровна Максакова, née: Sidorova; April 8, 1902 – August 11, 1974) was a Soviet opera singer, mezzo-soprano, a leading soloist in the Bolshoi Theatre (1923–1953), who enjoyed great success in the 1920s and 1930s, in the times often referred to as the golden age of Soviet opera. Maria Maksakova, the three times laureate of the Stalin Prize first degree (1946, 1949, 1951), was designated as a People's Artist of the USSR in 1971. The actress Lyudmila Maksakova is her daughter; singer and TV presenter Maria Maksakova her granddaughter.

== Biography ==
Maria Sidorova was born in Astrakhan, one of six children of Pyotr Sidorov, the executive director of the Volga Shipping company. After her father's death, ten-year-old Maria joined a local church choir to help her 27-year-old mother sustain a family. It was there that her vocal abilities were first noticed. Sidorova engaged herself in intensive self-education and a year later became a lead in the alto section of the choir, with which she stayed until 1917.

In late 1917, Sidorova joined the Astrakhan musical college to study the piano. She had no instrument at home, and had to stay at school to practise literally day and night. In the early 1918, she started studying vocal, originally as contralto. Regarded as one of the best in the class, she was often sent on obligatory 'tours' to sing for the Red Army soldiers and sailors. "I enjoyed success and was extremely proud of it", she later wrote. One of her tutors, Smolenskaya, started to train Sidorova as soprano, which Sidorova greatly enjoyed. "With her I studied for a year. Then the Astrakhan theatre was moved to Tsaritsyn and I decided to join its troupe, so as to go on studying with my pedagogue," she later recalled. "[Maksakova] mastered a professional vocal range, demonstrating flawless precision in intonations and perfect sense of rhythm. What was most attractive in the young singer's performances was her musical and verbal expressiveness, her total involvement with the lyrics", wrote Mikhail Lvov in his 1947 biography.

=== Success ===
In summer 1919 Sidorovamade her theatre debut as Olga in Eugene Onegin. In the autumn the famous baritone Maximilian Maksakov joined the theatre as a new director (and soloist) and gave her several new roles, including those in Faust and Rigoletto. Admiring the girl's gift, but seeing flaws in her technique, the maestro sent her to Petrograd for further studying. There she met Alexander Glazunov, was consulted by another professor who recognized a lyrical soprano in her, and then returned, to ask Maksakov for private lessons. The two became close, he proposed, and in 1920 they married, forming a sparkling duet on stage. In 1923 Maksakova came to Moscow, debuted (as Amneris, in Aida, as a last moment substitute for Nadezhda Obukhova, who fell ill) at the Bolshoi Theatre, and was invited to join the star-studded troupe.

Sergei Lemeshev in his memoirs revived the moment when a petite girl entered the stage, making young actors occupying the gallery wonder: could this be Amneris, or perhaps her young servant?

…Then the girl started to sing and we had to agree: this was Amneris after all. Her lyrical voice flew easily and freely, but what impressed us most was the integrity of her stage persona: for all her young age, she had the stateliness and commanding intonations of a princess who'd been accustomed to having an upper hand. Maksakova's Amneris so fascinated me, I forgot who sang Aida, Radames or Amonasro. What I do remember is that this evening I saw theatre's real wonder. All of us fell in love with Amneris. And the public, apparently, too, for the debutante received delightful reception.

Maksakova as Spring Beauty in The Snow Maiden

"Even then Maksakova fascinated us with her special way with words. Not only clear and crisp was her diction, but she got this dramatic expressiveness of phrase charged with inner strife of passion and jealousy. Besides, Amneris was enchantingly feminine", Lemeshev added.

Maximilian and Maria Maksakovs moved to Moscow and settled at Dmitrovka Street, in a communal flat. "[Max] turned his young wife's life into hard labour. Each day a home practice, with tears; then a performance in the evening, late at night – lots of scolding with more tears ... He was 33 years older but not for a moment did she come to regret those 15 years she spent with him", daughter Lyudmila Maksakova remembered.

Two of the theatre's stars provided inspiration for the young singer. "Watching the art of Nezhdanova and Sobinov ... I was beginning to realize for the first time that even great masters, in order to elevate their character to peaks of expressiveness have to expose their inner exaltation in the most stark, transparent ways; that hidden riches of an artist's inner world should come hand in hand with economy in outward movement", she wrote in autobiography.

In 1925 Maksakova moved to Leningrad's Mariinsky Theatre where she sang parts in Orfeo ed Euridice, Khovanshchina (Marfa) and Red Petrograd by Gladkovsky and Prussak (Comrade Dasha), among many others. In 1927 she returned to the Bolshoi, where she remained a leading soloist until her retirement 1953. She sang most of the leading female parts in the theater's classic repertoire, including Carmen, Marina Mniszech, Aksinya in The Quiet Don and Charlotte in Werther. In Gluck's Orfeo Maksakova featured as both a soloist and a co-director. She regularly embarked upon extensive concert tours, travelling all over the country with a repertoire which included famous arias, songs by the Soviet composers and her own interpretations of classic songs and romances by Tchaikovsky, Schubert and others. Maksakova, who was one of the first Soviet artists who in the mid-1930s received permission to perform abroad, and gave successful concerts in Turkey and Poland, later Sweden and (after the war) East Germany.

In 1936 Maximilian Maksakov died. Half a year later Maria married Yakov Davtyan, but this marriage did not last long. One night her husband, then a Soviet ambassador in Poland, was taken away by the secret police never to be seen or heard of again. Despite insinuations concerning Joseph Stalin's 'special attention' towards the famous singer (the Soviet dictator, who treated Bolshoi as a 'court troupe', allegedly referred to Maksakova as "my Carmen") she spent the late 1930s waiting for her arrest.

In 1940 Maksakova gave birth to daughter Lyudmila. She never revealed the identity of her father, not even to her daughter. Lyudmila Maksakova remembered: "Many years later a Moscow Art Theatre actor whom I met at the Morocco Film festival revealed to me the name of my father: Aleksander Volkov, the singer with the Bolshoi. 'Your father did not want to live in the USSR, he crossed the frontline and soon in the USA opened an opera and drama school,' this man told me. It was only then that I saw the reasons behind my mother's fear – not for herself, but for me, her only daughter." As the war was coming to an end, things for Maria Maksakova started to look brighter. In 1944 she won the 1st Prize at the Russian Folk song competition held by the Arts Committee of the USSR. In 1946 she received her first Stalin Prize "for the outstanding achievements in opera and the performing arts." Two more were to come, in 1949 and 1951.

=== Retirement and death ===
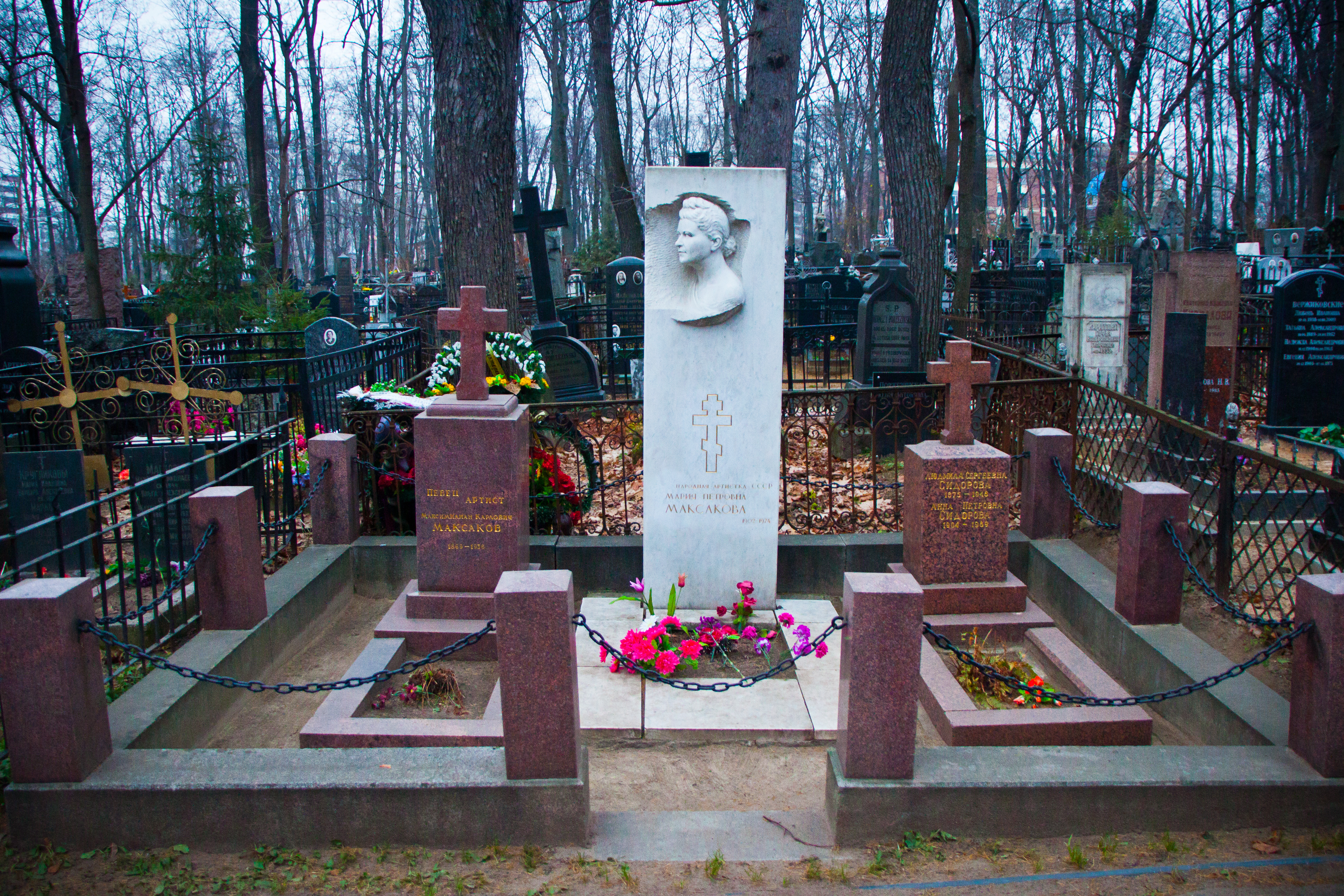
Maria Maksakova's grave at the Vvedenskoye Cemetery

In 1953 Maksakova received the notification of her 'retirement'. This came as an unpleasant surprise for the singer felt she was in superb shape, both physically and artistically. Rumours had it, some people at the Bolshoi decided to settle some old scores this way, now that Stalin, her much-feared patron, was now dead, and the name of Vera Davydova, another famous Soviet mezzosoprano, has been mentioned in this context. Lyudmila Maksakova refused to believe this, remembering the times when Davydova, who lived in a neighbouring dacha, helped her mother in difficult times. Davydova herself remembered her great rival with warmth. "Maria Petrovna paid great attention to the way she looked. She was beautiful and had excellent figure. Yet she kept herself perfectly fit, with strict diet and regular gymnastics ... Our relations were pure and friendly, each respected and valued what the other was doing on stage," Davydova maintained.

After her retirement from the Bolshoi, Maksakova joined Nikolay Osipov's Russian Folk orchestra as a soloist. In 1956 the Bolshoi invited Maksakova back, but her return was a one-off: she performed as Carmen, just to say farewell to her fans. In her later years Maksakova taught vocals at the Russian Academy of Theatre Arts (where she for many years held the position of a docent), was the head of the Folk vocal school in Moscow, published articles and essays. She was the driving force behind the opening of the Conservatory in her native Astrakhan. Among her protégés was Tamara Milashkina, later an acclaimed singer on her own right. In 1971 she was designated as a People's Artist of the USSR. When daughter Lyudmila called her mother to bring the news, the reply was: "So what? Now all this doesn't matter."

Maria Petrovna Maksakova died in Moscow on August 11, 1974. She was buried at the Vvedenskoye Cemetery.
