= Lyudmila Maksakova =

Soviet actress

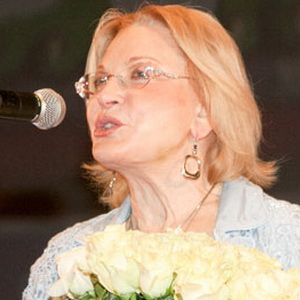
- Lyudmila Maksakova in 2013
- Born: Lyudmila Vasilyevna Maksakova; 26 September 1940 (age 85); Moscow, RSFSR, USSR
- Education: Shchukin Theatre Institute
- Occupations: Actress, director
- Years active: 1964–present
- Spouse(s): Lev Zbarsky; Peter Igenbergs
- Children: Maxim Maksakov; Maria Maksakova, Jr.

Lyudmila Vasilyevna Maksakova (Russian: Людмила Васильевна Максакова; born 26 September 1940) is a Soviet Russian stage and film actress who appeared in 24 films between 1965 and 1998. Honoured with the People's Artist of Russia title in 1980, she is also a laureate of the State Prize of the Russian Federation (1995) and the Stanislavsky Prize (1996). Her mother was the renowned mezzo-soprano Maria Maksakova Sr.; her daughter Maria is an opera singer and Russian TV Kultura presenter.

== Biography ==
Lyudmila Maksakova was born in Moscow to the Soviet opera star Maria Petrovna Maksakova and Aleksander Volkov, a theatre entrepreneur. In 1942 the latter defected to the West and later became a United States citizen. For decades Lyudmila remained unaware of her father's identity. By keeping it secret, Maria Petrovna was protecting her daughter from trouble at the times when any relation to a 'traitor' could lead to prosecution. According to another version, though, Lyudmila's father might have been the NKVD general Vasily Novikov, who granted Lyudmila Vasilyevna her patronymic, and there were even rumours pointing at Stalin himself, who was known to have favoured the famous Bolshoi singer.

=== Career ===
After the simultaneous graduation from a secondary school, and the Moscow Central music school where she studied cello, Lyudmila opted against pursuing a musical career and enrolled at the Shchukin Theatre Institute to join the actor Vladimir Etush's class. In 1961 she joined the Vakhtangov Theater where she debuted as Masha in The Cookie's Marriage (after Anatoly Sofronov's comedy). Her breakthrough came two years later when she played the Tatar Princess Adelma in the much acclaimed Vakhtangov production of Princess Turandot, revived by director Ruben Simonov. Among her other lauded performances were those of Lolya (Dion), Knipper-Chekhova (My Whimsical Happiness), Nicol (Le Bourgeois gentilhomme), Maria (The Cavalry Army, after Babel) and Mamayeva (Enough Stupidity in Every Wise Man).

In 1964 Maksakova debuted in film, as Nina in Grigory Chukhray's There Was an Old Couple. Over the next decade she appeared in more than fifteen films, including the revolutionary history drama Tatiana's Day (1967), the psychological melodrama Not Guilty (1969), the tragic melodrama The Bad Good Man (1973) and the psychological drama Autumn (1974). Among other critically acclaimed films she appeared in later, were Old Russian Vaudevilles' Evening (1979, where she played five different women), Igor Talankin's drama Father Sergius (after Leo Tolstoy's short story) and Die Fledermaus, Ian Frid's musical film after Johann Strauss Strauss' classic, alongside Yuri and Vitaly Solomin.

The early 1980s saw Maksakova enjoying her second wave of success in theatre. Much lauded were her Anna Karenina in Roman Viktyuk's 1983 production (based on Mikhail Roshchin's remake of Leo Tolstoy's novel), Paola in The Lady Without Camellias (after Terence Rattigan's play), Bizyukina in Soboryane (based on Leskov's novel) and Louise in I Don't Know You From Now On, Dear (after Aldo De Benedetti's play). Her performance in Pyotr Fomenko's production of Guilty Without Fault by Alexander Ostrovsky, earned Maksakova the USSR State Prize in 1995, and the Stanislavsky Prize a year later. In 2000s Maksakova started to teach at the Shchukin Theater Institute; her appearances on stage and on screen became rare and far between.

== Private life ==
Lyudmila Maksakova's first husband was the artist Lev Zbarsky (who in 1972 departed to Israel, then to the USA); they had a son, Maxim. In the mid-1970s Maksakova married Peter Igenbergs, a West German citizen. On 24 July 1977, she gave birth to a daughter, Maria, an opera singer and TV presenter.

== Filmography ==
- There Was an Old Couple (Nina, 1964)
- Tatyana's Day (Tatyana Ogneva, 1967)
- The Road to "Saturn" (Sophia Krauze, 1967)
- The End of 'Saturn' (Sophia Krauze, 1968)
- Not Guilty (Nadya, 1969)
- Faust (Margarita, 1969)
- A Train into Tomorrow (Lydia Konoplyova, 1970)
- Enough Stupidity in Every Wise Man, TV series (Mamayeva, 1971)
- Princess Turandot (Adelma, 1971)
- Witness' Disappearance (Nastya, 1971)
- The Battle After the Victory (Sophia Krauze, 1972)
- The Bad Good Man (Nadezhda Fyodorovna, 1973)
- The Touch (Tamara Fabritsius, 1973)
- Personal Matters Reception Day (Galina, 1974)
- Autumn (Margo, 1974)
- The Clara Gazul Theater (Clara Gazul, 1974)
- The 'Izotop' Cafe (Skurlatova, 1976)
- Summer in Nohant-Vic (George Sand, 1976)
- Father Sergius (Makovkina, 1978)
- The Old Russian Vaudevilles Evening (Kletkina, 1978)
- Die Fledermaus (Rosalinde, 1979)
- The Glembais (Charlotte, 1979)
- Idiot, television (Nastasya Filippovna, 1979)
- Richard III (Lady Anna, 1982)
- Prokhindiada or Running on the Spot (rector Maria Nikitichna, 1983)
- Trips on an Old Car (Zoya Pavlovna, 1985)
- By the Main Street with an Orchestra (Alla Maksimovna, 1986)
- Desyat Negrityat (Emily Brent, 1987)
- Mu-Mu (The Lady, 1989)
- An Ideal Couple, television series (Nadezda Potapova, 1989)
- Anna Karenina (Lydia Ivanovna, 2009)
- Attraction (Lyuba, 2017)
