= Maria Maksakova (mezzo-soprano, born 1977) =

Russian opera singer (born 1977)

Maria Maksakova Jr.
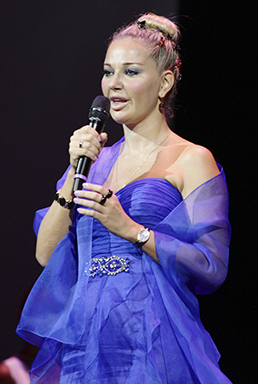
- Maksakova in 2015

Background information
- Born: Maria Petrovna Maksakova; 24 July 1977 (age 49); Munich, West Germany
- Genre: Opera
- Occupations: Opera singer (mezzo-soprano), TV presenter, film actress, model, politician
- Instruments: Vocals, piano
- Years active: 2000–present
- Website: www.maksakova.com

Maria Petrovna Maksakova Jr. (Russian: Мария Петровна Максакова-младшая; born 24 July 1977) is a Russian opera singer, a guest soloist with Bolshoi Theater (since 2003), soloist with Moscow's Helikon-Opera (since 2006) and Mariinsky Opera Company (2011). She is the daughter of actress Lyudmila Maksakova and granddaughter of Maria Maksakova, a renowned Russian and Soviet opera singer. Maria is the laureate of several prestigious events (including the Moscow International Opera Festival in 2000 and the II Obraztsova International Competition in 2002). Her extensive chamber repertoire includes works by Schumann, Schubert, Tchaikovsky, Rakhmaninov, Rimsky-Korsakov. In October 2016, Maksakova relocated from Moscow to Kyiv, Ukraine, with her husband Denis Voronenkov and baby son, saying that they were fleeing the political persecution of Voronenkov in Russia. On 23 March 2017, Voronenkov was murdered in Kyiv.

== Life and career ==
Maksakova was born in Munich, a daughter of the Soviet actress Lyudmila Maksakova and the Prague-born German businessman Peter Igenbergs, a son of Latvian Baltic German emigres. Maria spent her childhood at the village of Snegiri, outside Moscow, where Bolshoi Theatre soloists and many famous musicians had their summer dachas. She began studying music from the age of three and aged six enrolled at the piano department of the Moscow Conservatory's Central Music School. Her other tutors were Mivako Matsumoto, Gianfranco Pastine. With the latter, Maria toured Ukraine and Russia. In 1995, she graduated from the School with honours and at the age of fifteen decided to embark upon the career of a singer, joining the Russian Gnesin Academy of Music, the class of professor Margarita Miglau, a former Bolshoi Theatre soloist. In 1996, she enrolled into the Moscow State Law Academy which she graduated in 2002.

In 2000, Maria Maksakova took part in the Moscow Opera Festival and won the Best Debut prize for her interpretation of the part of Rosina in The Barber of Seville. The same year, Evgeny Kolobov invited her to the Moscow Novaya Opera Theatre where (2000–2006) she sang Ophelia (Hamlet by Ambroise Thomas), Snegurochka (The Snow Maiden by Rimsky-Korsakov), Linda di Chamounix by Gaetano Donizetti, Kseniya (Boris Godunov by Musorgsky), Zinaida (First Love by Andrei Golovin), and Leila (Les pêcheurs de perles by Georges Bizet), among others.

In 2003 she joined the Bolshoi as a guest soloist, appearing as Oscar (Un ballo in maschera by Giuseppe Verdi) and Musetta (La bohème by Giacomo Puccini). In 2006, she joined the Moscow Helikon-Opera and there appeared as The Princess in Antonín Dvořák's Rusalka, Rosina in II barbiere di Siviglia, Susanna in Mozart's Le nozze di Figaro and others.

In 2011, Maksakova joined the Mariinsky Opera Company where she sings Dorabella (Così fan tutte), Cherubino (Le nozze di Figaro), Frugola (Il tabarro), The Composer (Ariadne auf Naxos), Nicklausse (The Tales of Hoffmann), and Eboli (Don Carlos).

Maksakova is a TV presenter, co-host (from January 2010, alongside Svyatoslav Belza) of the Romantika Romansa series on the Russian Kultura TV. She appeared in several films (including The Barber of Siberia by Nikita Mikhalkov), and worked as a model. In 2002, Lancôme selected her for their projects in Russia.

Since 2017, Maksakova has been collaborating with Ukrainian pop singer and owner of a unique countertenor Alex Luna. The artists first performed their duet in Kyiv at the Vienna Ball. Already in 2018, they presented the Queen of Spades concert programme at the Odesa Philharmonic and at the Mykola Lysenko National Academic Opera and Ballet Theatre in Kharkiv.

Maksakova took part in international projects. She sang a recital in Musikverein (Vienna), and she sang concerts in Helsinki and Tokyo.

In 2021, Ukrainian journalist Kostyantyn Doroshenko published the book Aria of Mary, a biography of Maria Maksakova.

=== Political activity ===
In December 2011, Maksakova became a member of parliament (State Duma), representing the pro-president United Russia Party. Maksakova abstained twice during the vote on the anti-Magnitsky bill.

After originally voting for the Russian LGBT propaganda law in June 2013, Maksakova criticized it in a speech in the Duma in December 2013. She stated, that the law leads to increased violence against sexual minorities in Russia and that it tarnishes Russia's reputation abroad. The latter leading to less foreign investment in Russia and the discrimination of Russian artists abroad.

In May 2016, Maksakova lost the United Russia primaries in Saint Petersburg. She accused the authorities of vote manipulation and promised to complain to the party leaders.

In October 2016 (before the end of their parliamentary mandate), Maksakova and her husband and fellow Duma deputy Denis Voronenkov went into exile in Ukraine.

=== Personal life ===
Maksakova has German citizenship since she was born in Germany to a German father.

She was in a relationship with convicted felon and prominent thief in law Vladimir Tyurin.

Maksakova married former fellow Russian MP Denis Voronenkov (who also had two children from a previous relationship) in March 2015. Their son was born in April 2016. The couple met while working on a bill regulating the export of cultural artefacts. At the time, Voronenkov was a member of the Russian State Duma.

Voronenkov and Maksakova moved to Kyiv, Ukraine, in October 2016 after the Russian Prosecutor-General's Office refused to launch a probe against Voronenkov recommended by the Investigative Committee of Russia. In December 2016, Voronenkov became a Ukrainian citizen; according to Voronenkov, he was persecuted in Russia by the Russian Federal Security Service for speaking out against president Vladimir Putin and Kremlin policies, including the alleged drug trafficking by the FSB. On 23 March 2017, Voronenkov was murdered in Kyiv. Earlier that month, a court in Moscow had sanctioned Voronenkov's arrest in absentia. After the death of her husband, Maksakova was reportedly given personal protection by the Ukrainian Security Service.

== Discography ==
- Of Love Only (Лишь о любви. Music 2 Business, 2008)
- Stars Meekly Shone for Us (Нам звезды кроткие сияли, 2008)
- Songs by R.Schumann and F. Schubert (Р. Шуман, Ф.Шуберт. Песни., 2009)
- Best Loved Arias (Любимые арии, 2009)
- In Seville (В Севилье, 2009)
- My Voice Is for You (Мой голос для тебя, 2010)
