= List of Unreal episodes =

UnREAL is an American drama series that premiered on June 1, 2015, on Lifetime. Inspired by Sarah Gertrude Shapiro's award-winning independent short film Sequin Raze, the series was created by Marti Noxon and Shapiro, and stars Shiri Appleby as Rachel Goldberg, a young reality television producer pushed by her unscrupulous boss (Constance Zimmer) to swallow her integrity and do anything it takes to drum up salacious show content. Craig Bierko, Jeffrey Bowyer-Chapman, and Josh Kelly also star in supporting roles.

Season one features Freddie Stroma as Adam Cromwell, the "suitor" of Everlasting, while Johanna Braddy, Nathalie Kelley, Ashley Scott, and Breeda Wool starred as the contestants. Aline Elasmar also starred as a producer on the series. Season two features B.J. Britt as Darius Beck, the "suitor" of Everlasting, while Monica Barbaro, Denée Benton, Kim Matula, and Meagan Tandy star as the contestants. The second season also stars Michael Rady as a new producer on the series, and Gentry White as Darius' manager.

During the course of the series, 38 episodes of UnREAL aired over four seasons, between June 1, 2015, and July 16, 2018.

== Series overview ==
Season	Episodes	Originally released		
Season	Episodes	First released	Last released	Network
1	10	June 1, 2015	August 3, 2015	Lifetime
2	10	June 6, 2016	August 8, 2016	Lifetime
3	10	February 26, 2018	April 23, 2018	Lifetime
4	8	July 16, 2018		Hulu

== Episodes ==
=== Season 1 (2015) ===
No. overall	No. in season	Title	Directed by	Written by	Original release date	US viewers (millions)
1	1	"Return"	Peter O'Fallon	Marti Noxon & Sarah Gertrude Shapiro	June 1, 2015	0.815
The crew of the popular dating show Everlasting are shocked to find that their demanding and unscrupulous executive producer Quinn has rehired Rachel, a seasoned producer who had an epic meltdown during the previous season's finale. Among her surprised coworkers are rival producer Shia, and Rachel's cameraman ex-boyfriend Jeremy, who is now engaged to someone else. With a life and reputation to rebuild, Rachel steps back in the hot seat, swallowing her discomfort with the lies and manipulation that are required to keep the suitor Adam and a handful of other contestants from quitting, and all of the cast playing their assigned parts.
2	2	"Relapse"	David Solomon	Elizabeth Benjamin	June 8, 2015	0.707
Desperate to find a new "villain", Quinn offers a cash reward to the first producer who can create one from the remaining contestants. Rachel goes to new lows to secure the much-needed bonus money.
3	3	"Mother"	Uta Briesewitz	David Weinstein	June 15, 2015	0.565
Rachel faces her psychiatrist mother, and returns to find the show in shambles under Shia's control.
4	4	"Wife"	Uta Briesewitz	Ariana Jackson	June 22, 2015	0.552
The Everlasting crew shoots at Adam's run-down Napa Valley winery. Jeremy gets a promotion at work.
5	5	"Truth"	Peter Werner	Sarah Gertrude Shapiro	June 29, 2015	0.810
While on location in Faith's hometown in Mississippi, Rachel makes a surprising discovery about Faith and is torn whether or not to let it unfold on Everlasting. Quinn sues Chet.
6	6	"Fly"	Peter Werner	Alex Metcalf	July 6, 2015	0.739
Adam meets Mary's family during their one-on-one date, but she begins to unravel thanks to events put in motion by Shia, Rachel, Quinn and Chet.
7	7	"Savior"	Lev L. Spiro	Jordan Hawley	July 13, 2015	0.713
Mary's suicide has the cast and crew of Everlasting reeling, but Quinn and Rachel try to save the show from self-destruction, and themselves from prosecution.
8	8	"Two"	Lev L. Spiro	Elizabeth Benjamin & Alex Metcalf	July 20, 2015	0.731
Chet and Quinn offer Adam an opportunity to star in his own spinoff reality show by marrying the winning female contestant of Everlasting. When he refuses, Chet makes a deal with Rachel to secure Adam's consent. Jeremy breaks off his engagement with Lizzie to reunite with Rachel, but she cannot resist her attraction to Adam. Chet proposes to Quinn, but she later catches him cheating on her with her production assistant Madison.
9	9	"Princess"	Peter O'Fallon	Stacy Rukeyser	July 27, 2015	0.572
Rachel chooses Jeremy over Adam. She declines Quinn's offer of a partnership because she and Jeremy are considering getting out of the business; both a furious Quinn and a lovesick Adam know that this is not what Rachel really wants. The final three contestants have their final dates with Adam at his vineyard. Finding camera footage of Rachel and Adam having sex, Quinn blackmails Rachel into joining her new enterprise and Adam into going through with an on-camera wedding.
10	10	"Future"	Peter O'Fallon	Sarah Gertrude Shapiro & Jordan Hawley	August 3, 2015	0.790
Quinn convinces Adam to call things off with Rachel, who soon plots an explosive Everlasting finale to both score ratings and avenge herself on him. Chet turns the tables on Quinn. As planned, Anna humiliates Adam on live television, Quinn humiliates Chet in front of the network—and then Jeremy, finally discovering what Rachel has been up to, humiliates her in front of the entire crew. Quinn and Rachel are left with only each other.

=== Season 2 (2016) ===
No. overall	No. in season	Title	Directed by	Written by	Original release date	US viewers (millions)
11	1	"War"	Peter O'Fallon	Story by : Sarah Gertrude Shapiro; Teleplay by : Marti Noxon & Sarah Gertrude Shapiro	June 6, 2016	0.497
Quinn and Rachel are on top of their game as they pitch the first African-American suitor, football star Darius Beck, to the network. Rachel goes to work locking down the reluctant suitor and a much-needed activist contestant, but the new season's startup is further complicated by the return of Chet, who is determined to take over the show. Meanwhile, Rachel is faced with a hostile Jeremy, and gives Madison her first lesson in manipulation.
12	2	"Insurgent"	Peter O'Fallon	Stacy Rukeyser	June 13, 2016	0.520
Quinn and Chet face off, their ideas for the direction of the show so different that they decide to shoot them separately. Seeing both doom and an opportunity, Rachel goes to the network to seek intervention and hopefully snatch control of the show from both Quinn and Chet. They are stripped of power, but a new producer is brought in over Rachel. The new contestants jockey for Darius' attention as the producers manipulate them.
13	3	"Guerrilla"	Adam Kane	Alex Metcalf	June 20, 2016	0.478
Chet produces a more male-oriented version of the show; Quinn targets two contestants in hopes of producing a dramatic episode; and Rachel suspects Darius is hiding a secret. Meanwhile, Chet fights for custody of his son.
14	4	"Treason"	Adam Kane	Janine Nabers	June 27, 2016	0.534
Darius reveals his secret to Rachel and decides to quit the show, but Rachel asks Coleman to help change his mind. Quinn and Chet join forces to produce a football episode. Meanwhile, Quinn confronts Rachel about betraying her.
15	5	"Infiltration"	Janice Cooke	Alex Taub	July 4, 2016	0.549
Coleman invites Rachel to the Impact Awards; Quinn and Coleman vie for Rachel's loyalty; Quinn finds an ally in the network's new owner; Darius has an overnight date on the show. Meanwhile, Jeremy and Rachel's relationship causes problems on set.
16	6	"Casualty"	Shiri Appleby	Vince Calandra	July 11, 2016	0.568
Chet is there for Rachel as she deals with a trauma; Quinn pursues a new relationship; Rachel learns something surprising on a hometown date; an angry Darius makes a startling decision.
17	7	"Ambush"	Sarah Gertrude Shapiro	Ariana Jackson	July 18, 2016	0.524
Quinn interferes with Rachel and Coleman's new relationship; Darius decides to take a break from the show with Romeo; Rachel makes a decision with dangerous consequences. Meanwhile, an unexpected visitor stops by the set.
18	8	"Fugitive"	Nzingha Stewart	Alex Metcalf & Stacy Rukeyser	July 25, 2016	0.485
Rachel reveals a huge secret to Coleman in the aftermath of an incident with Darius. Quinn attempts to balance her attention between her feelings for John and the chaos on set. Chet receives attention from an unlikely source.
19	9	"Espionage"	Peter O'Fallon	Ariana Jackson & Carol Barbee	August 1, 2016	0.411
Coleman attempts to coerce Rachel into helping him destroy Quinn and the show, but Rachel has her own plan. Darius and Jay join forces to ensure their ideal contestants make it to the finale. Meanwhile, Quinn receives perspective-changing news.
20	10	"Friendly Fire"	Peter O'Fallon	Alex Metcalf & Stacy Rukeyser	August 8, 2016	0.481
Quinn's plans for the final two contestants could be foiled by an unexpected turn of events. Meanwhile, Rachel stands up to Coleman just as his plot to expose the show begins to unfold.

=== Season 3 (2018) ===
No. overall	No. in season	Title	Directed by	Written by	Original release date	US viewers (millions)
21	1	"Oath"	Peter O'Fallon	Sarah Gertrude Shapiro & Stacy Rukeyser	February 26, 2018	0.252
With Everlasting on the verge of cancellation due to investors backing out after last season's events, Quinn disturbs Rachel's truth cleanse and admits she needs her in order to save the show. Chet proves necessary in pitching the show's first Suitress as he sets his eyes on an Emmy, taking on a more active role behind the scenes while bringing his new girlfriend to see the show's opening night. Jeremy returns to work after getting sober by completing rehab, and taking anger management classes. Rachel bonds with Suitress Serena, a successful tech executive who proves difficult to manage, while Madison sleeps with a network executive as she embarks on a journey to overthrow Quinn. Meanwhile, Rachel finds that the show's new shrink has not just been hired for the contestants.
22	2	"Shield"	Peter O'Fallon	Jordan Hawley	March 5, 2018	0.260
After beating all the guys at poker, Serena finds the majority of the guys lose interest in her. Chet convinces her to give the guys what they want in a woman, resulting in Serena dumbing it down. Quinn lands in a tough spot when Gary, the network executive, visits the set just when Rachel decides to stick to the show's official premise rather than manipulation, per her Essential Honesty cleanse. However, her plan backfires when a fight erupts between the contestants. With Chet's model girlfriend visiting once again and Madison out for more power, Quinn is confronted with her own love life or lack thereof, while Rachel grows closer to contestant August.
23	3	"Clarity"	Sheree Folkson	Lisa Albert	March 12, 2018	0.248
Quinn punishes Rachel for working against her and replaces her with Madison as Serena's producer. After a patriarchal date, Serena renounces Chet's ways and turns back to Rachel with Madison losing her newfound power. Rachel herself teams up with Chet to shoot behind-the-scenes footage to expose the sexism behind the show, but Quinn soon finds out. This leads to an explosive confrontation in which Quinn doubts her decision to bring Rachel back. Distraught, Rachel returns to her old ways to keep the contestants in line when Jasper reveals to fellow contestants that he's only participating to win a $400,000 bet. Meanwhile, Quinn continues her sexual relationship with August just when Serena takes real interest in him and Rachel starts to look at a dark page from her past after confiding in the show's new shrink. Jay sets out to create and pitch his own show with Quinn's help.
24	4	"Confront"	Shiri Appleby	David M. Israel	March 19, 2018	0.283
Quinn and Jay are preparing their pitch for Passport to Dance with Alexi as the show's presenter. The contestants pitch their dream dates to Serena and Quinn has Rachel convince Serena to pick Alexi in order to create a positive image for him that will help with the pitch. However, Jay discovers that Alexi is doing drugs and agrees to become his supplier in order to secure his cooperation for the project. Serena finds out about Quinn's sexual relationship with August. Quinn takes it upon herself to teach Madison to be her own woman to launch a solid career. Chet invites a reporter to set, who sees right through Quinn's attempt to have her focus on the drama surrounding August's man bun and makes it her mission to uncover what the producers are hiding. Meanwhile, Rachel confronts the man who violated her as a child, only to find out that her father has known since it happened.
25	5	"Gestalt"	Peter O'Fallon	Sarah Gertrude Shapiro	March 26, 2018	0.248
Rachel confronts her father, but she finds out his mother convinced him it would be best for their daughter to keep it quiet and numbed him with medication to quiet the guilt. She decides to free him from her mother's control and takes him to set with her, where she asks Simon to look after him so they can take him off lithium. Simon's interest in Rachel peaks and he plants a camera in her truck. Quinn is furious when Gary refuses to hear her and Jay's pitch, leading to her shutting down production on Everlasting. She manages to get Madison on her side, and with the password she stole from him, they manage to uncover that he hid 18 million dollars he made off Everlasting internationally. She blackmails him into giving her development deals, including a straight-to-series order for Passport to Dance, as well as carte blanche for Everlasting. Chet admits to missing Quinn after witnessing her power play. August threatens to sue Quinn for harassment if she doesn't make sure he stay on the show, but she uses Rachel to discredit him. Serena grows closer to Jasper and has sex with him, but she's thrown for a loop when August in a last ditch effort to stay reveals to her the bet Jasper came to win. Furious, she thwarts the elimination ceremony and declares she's making her own rules from now on. Alexi pressures Jay into continuing their arrangement.
26	6	"Transference"	David Solomon	David Branson Smith	April 2, 2018	0.245
Rachel tries to keep her father's presence on the set a secret as he goes into withdrawal, but he is soon discovered and has a breakdown that reveals Rachel's deepest secret to everyone on set. Rachel has to make a choice between the cabin of her dreams or paying for her father's treatment. Jay and his boyfriend break up after a fight over Passport to Dance makes Jay realize he may not be ready to fully commit. Giving Serena the impression that she's in charge, the producers agree to her idea of a one-on-one talk with each of the remaining guys except Jasper. She picks Guy for a date in his restaurant. To spice things up, Quinn and Chet compile a sizzle reel of moments to insinuate that cowboy Warren is actually in love with Guy and have Warren crash the date. Jeremy's concerns for Rachel are sparked after her father's breakdown.
27	7	"Projection"	Hanelle Culpepper	Freddy Gaitan & Ashley Sims	April 9, 2018	0.314
Seeking supervised visitation rights for his son, Chet asks Quinn to be his character witness. Rachel keeps checking in on her dad, who eventually signs himself out the treatment center. Serena chooses Owen for the home date and meets his daughter Riley, only to question if she's ready to become the girl's mother figure. Rachel sympathizes due to her own family situation and talks Serena into cutting Owen on location. However, Quinn senses that Rachel's not doing her job "right" and flies down to Colorado to take over. She ends up exploiting Riley's fear of clowns, leading to a dangerous situation that leaves Serena a hero in Owen's eyes and awakens Serena's motherly instincts. Back at the mansion, Madison and Charlie shoot some great footage of Jasper and August competing while Jay bonds with Alexi while they prepare for Passport to Dance. Charlie breaks up with Jeremy over his continuous interest in Rachel. Chet finds out about Quinn endangering the girl's life and a fight ensues, leading to Chet pondering to accept Gary's offer to hand him Quinn's head by getting proof of every shady thing she's ever done.
28	8	"Recurrent"	Constance Zimmer	Alex Metcalf	April 16, 2018	0.369
Quinn takes a day off and spends it with Fiona, until Chet comes looking for her. They travel to Los Angeles and she shows him the house she's building for herself. Rachel visits her mother to confront her and announces that she's no longer her daughter. Chet plays Madison's fear of being fired now that her last guy is off the show. As she's the only one left in charge, she sets out to create nuclear drama and invites Serena's ex to the set, where the guy spills on her stalker-like behavior after he wanted to end things between them. In order to fix the damage, Rachel shines a light on Jasper's tumultuous past romances and personal issues. Meanwhile, August and Serena have sex after he tells her he doesn't care what her ex revealed about her and Alexi makes it clear to Jay that there is no romantic relationship between them. Chet reveals to Quinn what Gary requested and they team up to take Gary down once and for all. After Dr. Simon turns her down, Rachel has sex with Alexi, much to Jay's dismay.
29	9	"Codependence"	Sarah Gertrude Shapiro	Ariana Jackson	April 23, 2018	0.263
Rachel helps Serena navigate the homestretch and narrow the suitors down to two at Chet's lifetime achievement gala. However, clashing opinions cause a public fight. Meanwhile, Quinn's plan to take down Gary takes a turn.
30	10	"Commitment"	Peter O'Fallon	Stacy Rukeyser	April 23, 2018	0.218
A life-changing offer from Serena and a shocking discovery about Dr. Simon drive Rachel to strongly question her future at Everlasting. Chet makes an astonishing confession while Quinn takes one final swing at Gary.

=== Season 4 (2018) ===
No. overall	No. in season	Title	Directed by	Written by	Original release date
31	1	"All In"	Peter O'Fallon	David M. Israel & Stacy Rukeyser	July 16, 2018
Quinn returns from vacation just in time for the start of 'Everlasting All Stars', featuring winners and losers from previous seasons. Rachel, having reinvented herself, is determined to make this season memorable.
32	2	"Double Down"	Peter O'Fallon	Jordan Hawley	July 16, 2018
Rachel continues in her pursuit of a "ring," flirting with each of the contestants and going so far as to sleep with one. She and new producer Tommy work to keep their perfectly planned season from being destroyed by a panicked Quinn.
33	3	"Wild Card"	Shiri Appleby	Maria Maggenti	July 16, 2018
The first episode of "Passport to Dance" premieres as Everlasting contestants compete to be a guest judge. Alexi, sick of Jay's condescension, acts out on live TV, causing havoc. Quinn and Chet deal with shocking news.
34	4	"Cold Call"	Anna Mastro	Mark Driscoll	July 16, 2018
Quinn deals with the news of her geriatric pregnancy and August's knowledge of the pregnancy. Chet plans his dream wedding and thinks of their child while Rachel and Jay try to save Passport to Dance, harming Alexi in the process.
35	5	"No Limit"	Constance Zimmer	David M. Israel	July 16, 2018
Quinn's maternal instinct is tested when Chet ends up with his son at work. The show is put at stake as Rachel takes things too far on the set of Everlasting.
36	6	"Tilt"	Victor Nelli Jr.	Ashley Sims	July 16, 2018
The Everlasting crew deals with the consequences of the previous episode. Rachel and Quinn double cross each other when the network gets involved. The contestants start to question the lies that Rachel has been telling.
37	7	"Bluff"	Jessica Borsiczky	Ariana Jackson	July 16, 2018
Rachel and Quinn go head to head as the betrayals pile up and the contestants become fed up.
38	8	"Sudden Death"	Shiri Appleby	Sarah Gertrude Shapiro & Stacy Rukeyser	July 16, 2018
Rachel begins to question her decisions leading up to the finale. Quinn must decide whether to intervene and save the Everlasting finale.
