= Peacemaker Presents: The Vigilante/Eagly Double Feature! =

2025 tie-in comic

Publication information
- Publisher: DC Comics
- Format: Limited series
- Genre: Superhero
- Publication date: March – August 2025
- No. of issues: 5
- Main character(s): Vigilante; Eagly

Creative team
- Written by: Tim Seeley; Rex Ogle; Freddie Stroma
- Artist(s): Mitch Gerads; Matteo Lolli
- Penciller: Matteo Lolli
- Inker: Matteo Lolli
- Letterer: Pat Brosseau
- Colorist: John Kalisz

Peacemaker Presents: The Vigilante/Eagly Double Feature! is a comic miniseries based on the characters Vigilante and Eagly from the DC Studios television series Peacemaker. The comic is set between the two seasons of the series and follows Vigilante, who is unaware that Peacemaker is on vacation and takes down two gangs under the belief that a villain named Controller has kidnapped Peacemaker.

== Plot ==
=== A Time For Fables ===
Gang leaders Withers and Scarapelli meet at an axe-throwing range with their bodyguards, Cannon and Saber, as well as other members of their respective gangs, but Vigilante arrives and starts killing gang members. Cannon and Saber try to fight Vigilante, but he quickly defeats them. The gangs flee, so Vigilante asks a dying gang member why Withers and Scarapelli were meeting, but the gang member can only get out the syllable "Con". Vigilante rushes to work at the diner where he is a bus boy, but is sent home, so he goes to Peacemaker's trailer. Peacemaker is not home, so Vigilante calls him. Peacemaker claims to be in danger and lets Vigilante assume he was kidnapped by a robot villain called Controller.

Wanting to rescue Peacemaker, Vigilante attacks Withers' retirement home. Withers and Scarapelli have another meeting, where they learn from a survivor of Vigilante's search and decide to retire from crime together. Researching Controller, Vigilante believes that Controller is a Converticon, not realizing he is looking at a website about movies, robots who can transform into cars. He overhears a conversation about cars being given out for free, which happens to be run by the Withers and Scarapelli gangs returning the cars they had stolen. Vigilante destroys the cars and gets stabbed, but does not bleed or die. This leads Vigilante to believe he is a robot, and Withers and Scarapelli to decide to go public about their actions and hide behind popular opinion.

Vigilante's coworker at the restaurant, Theresa, tells Vigilante that the dinner is being held there, but Vigilante attacks. Vigilante learns through an x-ray at the dinner that he is not a robot and gets rendered unconscious. Theresa helps Vigilante leave, and Vigilante finds a condom behind the restaurant, leading him to realize that Cannon and Saber are dating and were using Vigilante to get Withers and Scarapelli out of the way. Recognizing the smell of the condom, Vigilante goes to the factory where it was made, where Cannon and Saber have kidnapped Withers and Scarapelli. Cannon and Saber ask the Pacific Association to take over the operations, but Vigilante attacks and kills the Association's members. Cannon and Saber rush back to Withers and Scarapelli, who they find having sex. Vigilante finds the four of them and fights them while Peacemaker returns home and remembers what he said to Vigilante, rushing to join him in the fight. Saber stabs Vigilante, but Withers and Scarapelli attack Saber. Peacemaker takes the head of a robot from the Pacific Association and reaches Vigilante, claiming that it is the Controller and Vigilante saved him. They burn the condom factory and Adrian has sex with Theresa, who is disappointed in the quality. Peacemaker and Vigilante continue to work together.

=== Peaceful Vacation ===
Peacemaker and his pet, Eagly, kill all the members of an organization called "Nazi Lizards" and return to their trailer. Realizing that they are not connecting, they decide to take a vacation to Alaska. Peacemaker interacts with the people sitting near him on the plane, when a gas appears and renders them all unconscious.

The passengers wake up in a field, where a flight attendant and several others are shot and killed. Eagly finds the shooter and knocks them out of their tree, leading Peacemaker to snap the shooter's neck. Peacemaker puts on his uniform and decides to nickname a passenger, Kris, "Other Chris", which annoys him. Peacemaker fights another attacker, who reveals that they are being hunted by the League of Assassins as part of an annual game. Peacemaker assures everyone he will get them home, but they get attacked again. Eagly rips the attacker's face off. The group try to find a defensible position, but Peacemaker gets stabbed. Other Chris pulls the sword out of Peacemaker while Eagly goes after the attacker. The other survivors kill the assassin while Peacemaker and Eagly recover from their injuries.

Believing themselves to be safe, the survivors rest at a nearby cabin and tend to Peacemaker and Eagly, but Other Chris attacks, revealing himself to be a member of the League. The other survivors watch the ensuing fight, which Peacemaker and Eagly win. The three remaining survivors decide to reward Peacemaker with sex for saving them.

== Publication history ==
At New York Comic Con held in October 2024, DC Studios announced a tie-in comic for DC Extended Universe (DCEU) Peacemaker (2022-2025) featuring Vigilante and Eagly from the series. Series creator James Gunn soon clarified that although it is promoting Peacemaker, the comic itself is not canon to the DC Universe (DCU).

The Vigilante story, "A Time For Fables", was written by Tim Seeley with art by Mitch Gerads. Seeley expressed that he felt lucky to be able to write for Vigilante. The Eagly story, "Peaceful Vacation", was written by Rex Ogle, who expressed excitement to be able to "unleash [his] inner creative beast". The art was done by Matteo Lolli and John Kalisz. The story is intended to be set between the first and second season of the television Peacemaker series, as Gunn worked as a story consultant on the comic. The comic spent a long time in preparation to accommodate Gunn's schedule as he took over DC Studios.

The stories use separate art styles, with the art style of the Vigilante story allowing the reader to experience Vigilante's thought process. Each issue also features an entry in Vigilante's journal written by Freddie Stroma, who plays Vigilante in the series.

The first issue was published on March 26, 2025. Earlier that month, official art was released featuring the two characters and Peacemaker by Darick Robertson, Matteo Lolli and Dan Panosian.

== Reception ==
Collier Jennings of AIPT expressed a preference for the Vigilante story, owing it to the art and writing of Gerads and Seeley. He praised the humor in the script, including Gunn as part of the reason, and the photorealism of the art to make it truly feel like an entry in the television series. He praised a particular page in the first issue in which Vigilante easily defeats Cannon and Saber. In contrast, while he appreciated the humor and art style of the Eagly story, Jennings said he wanted more of the absurdism of the opening fight against the Nazi Lizards. He noted that the use of the DC Black Label allowed the comic to be as violent as the series, saying that it finally felt like the Black Label was being used to its fullest extent. In reviewing the second issue, Jennings continued to praise the artwork, citing it as a reason the comic continued to be humorous. He also praised the artwork in the Eagly story, noting that both the artists and Ogle appeared to be testing the boundaries of what they could put in the comic.

== Collected editions ==
- Peacemaker Presents: The Vigilante/Eagly Double Feature! (ISBN 978-1799506331)
