= The New England Roses =

New England Roses
- Origin: USA
- Years active: 2002–present
- Labels: Doggpony Records
- Members: JD Samson; Sarah Shapiro; Brendan Fowler
- Website: Official site

New England Roses are an American band formed in 2002 by JD Samson from Le Tigre, Sarah Gertrude Shapiro co-creator of UnREAL and Brendan Fowler from BARR who met while studying at Sarah Lawrence College.

Their music takes on aspects of Lo-Fi pop and electronica. The involvement of band members in other groups means that their songs have been written in their spare time. They have also covered tracks by George Michael, Tracy Chapman, and Dave Matthews.

== Releases ==
- 7" (2005)
- Face Time With Son (2005)

== See also ==
- Le Tigre
