= Vigilante (character) =

Several fictional characters appearing in DC Comics

- Publisher: DC Comics
- First appearance: Action Comics #42 (November 1941)
- Created by: Mort Weisinger (writer); Mort Meskin (art)
- Characters: Greg Saunders; Adrian Chase; Alan Welles; Dave Winston; Patricia Trayce; Adeline Kane; Justin Powell; Dorian Chase; Donald Fairchild

Vigilante is the name used by several fictional characters appearing in American comic books published by DC Comics. Notable individuals to assume the alias include Greg Saunders and Adrian Chase.

An original incarnation of Vigilante named Vincent Sobel appears in the television series Arrow, played by Clayton Chitty and Johann Urb and voiced by Mick Wingert. Freddie Stroma plays the Adrian Chase incarnation of Vigilante in the television series Peacemaker.

== Fictional character biographies ==
=== Greg Saunders ===
The original version of Vigilante was a western-themed hero named Greg Sanders (later retconned in the 1990s to "Saunders") who debuted in Action Comics #42 (November 1941). The Vigilante had a teen sidekick introduced in 1942, Stuff the Chinatown Kid.

=== Adrian Chase ===
Adrian Chase first appeared as the second version of Vigilante in The New Teen Titans Annual #2 (August 1983) by writer Marv Wolfman and penciler George Pérez. Chase was a district attorney in New York City who went rogue after his wife and children were killed by a gang boss.

=== Alan Welles ===
The third person to assume the Vigilante identity was Alan Welles, a fellow judge and friend of Adrian Chase. His first appearance was in Vigilante #7, and later in Vigilante #20 as Vigilante. He secretly operated in a much more violent manner, even executing petty thieves. His mental instability eventually led him to gun down police officers and civilians. Chase felt responsible for this threat and began a long investigation to take down Vigilante until Chase found out he was Welles, forcing Chase to kill him.

=== Dave Winston ===
The fourth person to assume the Vigilante identity was Dave Winston, Adrian Chase's bailiff. He refused to kill and traded on the fierce reputation of Vigilante to intimidate information out of thugs. He debuted in Vigilante #23 and later as Vigilante in Vigilante #28. He believed that the Vigilante's efforts were noble and worthwhile. When Alan Welles was killed after ruining the Vigilante's reputation, Winston took up the mantle believing that the city needed the Vigilante. When Chase found out about Winston's actions, he chose to wash his hands of the affair. When Chase and girlfriend Marcia King boarded a plane for Europe, it was hijacked; Winston and Peacemaker both responded to the emergency, but Winston was killed by Peacemaker in front of Chase, making Chase believe he was unable to escape the Vigilante's legacy.

=== Patricia Trayce ===
The next Vigilante was Patricia Trayce, a rogue Gotham City police detective who teams up with Deathstroke in the Deathstroke series written by Marv Wolfman and George Pérez. Trayce found Adrian Chase's gear and adapted the guise. She was also Deathstroke's lover. Trayce becomes Vigilante in Deathstroke the Terminator #11.

=== Justin Powell ===
Late in 2005, DC published a Vigilante limited series by writer Bruce Jones and artist Ben Oliver. The identity of the title character is initially left mysterious, but apparently this is a new incarnation of the character.

His name was Justin "Jay" Sutter. When he encountered a murderer as a child, he created a second personality in his mind, The Vigilante. At some point, he changed his name to Justin Scott Powell and would become the Vigilante subconsciously. While Powell was unaware of the Vigilante personality, the Vigilante knew about Powell. At the miniseries' end, Powell was able to reconcile the two personalities.

In Infinite Crisis, Vigilante joins Wild Dog and the current Crimson Avenger in attacking the Trigger Twins, the Madmen, the second Spellbinder.

=== Dorian Chase ===
Dorian Chase appeared in Nightwing #133–137. While he wears a costume similar to Adrian Chase's, it is a new depiction under the mask.

The Vigilante also appears in Gotham Underground, set after his initial encounter with Nightwing. He is shown to be a formidable fighter, but is defeated easily by Batman.

Vigilante initially operates under the identity of Joe Flynn, a small-time criminal with a rap sheet, but it is later revealed that the real Flynn is dead. Dorian has the technology to graft another person's face to his own and his assistant changes the police records so his fingerprint and DNA point back to his fake identity. At the end of the first story arc, Dorian abandons the Joe Flynn identity and begins to make preparations to assume a new identity of a dead and forgotten criminal. It is also revealed that Dorian is the brother of Adrian Chase. Little is known about his past, but his wife is dead and he served time in prison for his work with the mob.

Vigilante plays an important role in the "Deathtrap" crossover with the Teen Titans and the Titans. He targets the unbalanced Jericho for assassination, bringing him into conflict with the various heroes. Vigilante tracks down Jericho and gouges out his eyes to disable his power of possession, which is activated via eye contact.

The Vigilante had been operating unseen in Europe for several years before moving back to the U.S. and going after local mobs and criminals.

=== Donald Fairchild ===
In the DC Rebirth miniseries Vigilante: Southland, a new Vigilante is introduced: Donald Fairchild, a former professional basketball player. Fairchild moonlights as a janitor and by night fights crime in Los Angeles.

== Powers and abilities ==
The Vigilante is a skilled hand-to-hand combatant, an experienced marksman, and a master of the lariat.

== Other versions ==
=== Multiverse ===
Pre-Crisis, there were both an Earth-1 and an Earth-2 Vigilante. Both were Greg Saunders from their respective Earths. Earth-1's Vigilante was shown for the first time in the pages (and cover) of the JLA issue where the superteam moved to their classic headquarters on an orbiting satellite.

=== Detective Comics ===
In Detective Comics #493 (August 1980) it was revealed that Greg Saunders had a nephew, Michael Carter, who became a costumed crimefighter too, the Swashbuckler. The Swashbuckler was created by the issue's writer, Cary Burkett, for a fanzine he published in middle school. Burkett said he made the Swashbuckler the nephew of the Vigilante because he did not have enough space to present the entire backstory he had created for the character in the fanzine.

=== Kingdom Come ===
An unnamed incarnation of Vigilante appears in Kingdom Come. This version is a cyborg with a mechanical arm who wields a gatling gun.

=== Jake Chill ===
A futuristic incarnation of Vigilante named Jake Chill appears in the DCAU tie-in comic Batman Beyond (vol. 2) before being officially integrated into the DC Comics Multiverse in Batman Beyond (vol. 4). He is the great-grandnephew of Joe Chill and a former member of Derek Powers' "Quiet Squad", a small team of Wayne-Powers security guards who served as Powers' personal hit and intimidation squad. Additionally, Jake murdered Warren McGinnis, father of the new Batman, Terry McGinnis. Seeking to atone for his misdeeds, he uses his Wayne-Powers security equipment to become the Vigilante and works alongside Batman until he is killed by the Jokerz.

== In other media ==
=== Television ===
Johann Urb as Vincent Sobel / Vigilante as seen on Arrow.

- The Greg Saunders incarnation of Vigilante appears in Justice League Unlimited, voiced by an uncredited Michael Rosenbaum in the episode "Task Force X" and Nathan Fillion in the episodes "Hunter's Moon" and "Patriot Act". This version is a member of the Justice League.
- The Greg Saunders incarnation of Vigilante appears in Batman: The Brave and the Bold, voiced by John DiMaggio.
- An original incarnation of Vigilante named Vincent Sobel appears in Arrow, portrayed by Clayton Chitty in the fifth season and by Johann Urb in the sixth season while Mick Wingert provides his disguised voice. This version was a former member of the Central City Police Department who worked undercover alongside Dinah Drake, with whom he shared a secret relationship. After they were both captured by a group of criminals, Sobel and Drake were exposed to dark matter from Harrison Wells's particle accelerator, which turned Sobel into a metahuman with the ability to self-regenerate, though he was presumed dead. Resurfacing four years later as the "Vigilante", he targets and kills criminals before coming into conflict with Oliver Queen and the latter's allies. After targeting a councilwoman due to an anti-vigilante bill, he is thwarted by Drake who discovers his identity. Sobel attempts to reconcile his relationship with Drake despite their differing stances on fighting crime, though without success. Due to his love for Drake, he became a double agent within Cayden James's criminal cabal to inform Drake and Queen of their activities. When his partners find out about his treachery however, Sobel is killed by Black Siren.
- The Greg Saunders incarnation of Vigilante appears in a picture depicted in the Stargirl episode "Brainwave" as a member of the Seven Soldiers of Victory.
- The Adrian Chase incarnation of Vigilante appears in Peacemaker, portrayed by Freddie Stroma.

=== Film ===
- The Greg Saunders incarnation of Vigilante appears in a self-titled film series, portrayed by Ralph Byrd.
- The Greg Saunders incarnation of Vigilante makes a non-speaking cameo appearance in Justice League: The New Frontier.

=== Video games ===
- The Vincent Sobel incarnation of Vigilante appears as an unlockable playable character in Lego DC Super-Villains via the "DC Super-Villains TV Series" DLC pack.
- The Adrian Chase incarnation of Vigilante appears as a playable character in DC Worlds Collide.
