= Brendan Fowler =

American multi-disciplinary artist

Beatrix Fowler (March 24, 1978) is a Los Angeles-based musician and multi-disciplinary artist who works in photography, sculpture, and performance.

== Early life ==
Fowler grew up in Berkeley, California, before moving to rural Maryland as a child with her mother. According to Fowler, her father died from a heroin overdose.

== Career ==
While living in New York City, Fowler began performing music under the name BARR. She described this early era of solo performance as being "really hostile. Attacking and grabbing people and wrestling the audience—really physical". After graduating from Sarah Lawrence College in New York, Fowler formed a band called The New England Roses alongside her college friends JD Samson (of Le Tigre) and Sarah Gertrude Shapiro. They began to write their own indie rock songs and performed altered covers of popular songs.

In February 2002, Fowler moved to Los Angeles. She continued performing music but shifted style in response to the calming atmosphere around her. After a short hiatus she changed the name of her act to BARR, intended as a tribute to her friend Mick Barr. She was signed to the indie label Kill Rock Stars.

Fowler was a co-editor of the arts magazine ANP Quarterly (meaning "Artist Network Program"), which was financed by the clothing company RVCA. She worked alongside artists Ed Templeton and Aaron Rose on the publication.

In 2009, Fowler presented shows at the Art Basel and New Art Dealers Alliance fairs in Miami, Florida.

In 2017, she held an exhibition at Richard Telles Fine Art in Los Angeles titled "New Portraits".

Fowler has created two clothing brands. The first is Election Reform!, which uses streetwear to engage the public in politics and reform of the American electoral system. The second is Some Ware, a collaborative project with artist Cali DeWitt.

== Personal life ==
Fowler has spoken openly about her obsessive–compulsive disorder (OCD), saying that "I feel like it's a good thing to talk about [...] I spent so many years feeling so alone".

She is transgender.

== Discography ==
- Split 7" (with Lil Pocketknife) (2004), Deathbomb Arc, Abstract Machine
- What Would the Second BARR (2004), Doggpony Records, Tapes Records
- Split 7" (with This Song Is A Mess But So Am I) (2005), Oedipus Records
- Beyond Reinforced Jewel Case (2005), 5RC
- PPM9 7" (2006) PPM
- Summary (2007), 5RC
