= Critics' Choice Television Award for Most Exciting New Series =

The Critics' Choice Television Award for Most Exciting New Series was one of the award categories presented annually by the Broadcast Television Journalists Association. It was introduced in 2011 when the event was first initiated and last presented in 2016.

== Process ==
The winners were selected by a group of television critics that are part of the Broadcast Television Critics Association. Unlike other categories, this award honored all genres and every nominee is a winner. This category was for the most exciting new series of the next television season/year.

== Winners ==
=== 2010s ===
Year	Show (all honorees)
2011	Alcatraz *; Awake *; Don't Trust the B— in Apartment 23; Falling Skies; New Girl; Ringer *; Smash; Terra Nova *
2012	The Following; The Mindy Project; Nashville; The Newsroom; Political Animals (miniseries) *
2013	Agents of S.H.I.E.L.D.; The Bridge; Masters of Sex; The Michael J. Fox Show *; Ray Donovan; Under the Dome
2014	Extant; Gotham; Halt and Catch Fire; The Leftovers; Outlander; Penny Dreadful; The Strain
2015	American Crime Story; Aquarius; Blindspot; Minority Report *; The Muppets *; Scream Queens; Supergirl; UnREAL
2016	Atlanta; Better Things; Designated Survivor; The Good Place; One Mississippi; Pitch *; This Is Us; Westworld

* Shows were not renewed for a second season
