= Shiri Appleby =

American actress

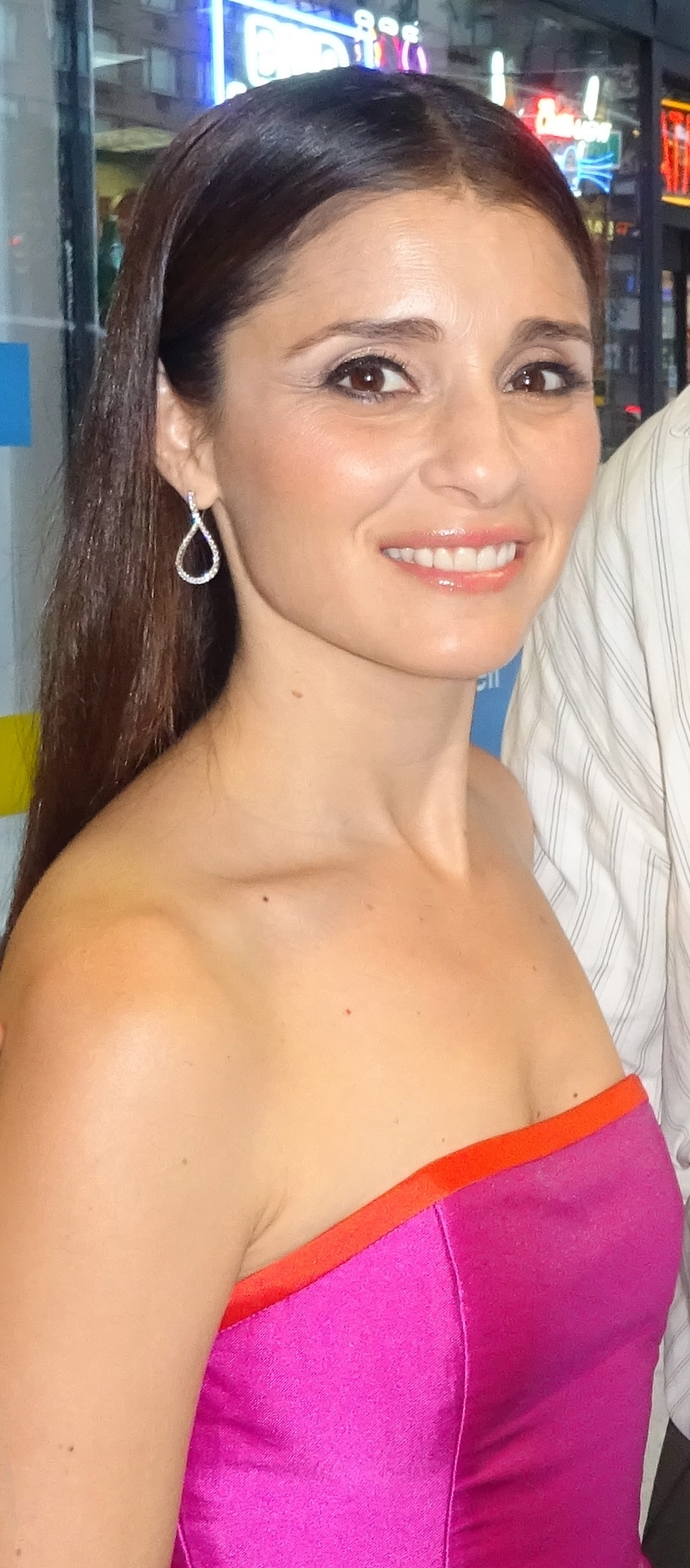
- Appleby in New York City, 2016
- Occupations: Actress; director
- Years active: 1985–present
- Spouse: Jon Shook (m. 2013)
- Children: 2

Shiri Appleby is an American actress and television director. She is best known for her leading roles as Liz Parker in the WB/UPN science fiction drama series Roswell (1999–2002) and Rachel Goldberg in the Lifetime/Hulu drama series Unreal (2015–2018). Her major film credits include A Time for Dancing (2000), Swimfan (2002), Havoc (2005), Charlie Wilson's War (2007), and The Devil's Candy (2015).

Appleby starred as intern Daria Wade in the final season of the NBC medical drama series ER (2008–2009). She later portrayed Cate Cassidy in The CW drama series Life Unexpected (2010–2011) and Lucy Lambert in the web comedy series Dating Rules from My Future Self (2012). Appleby also had recurring roles on the NBC drama series Chicago Fire (2012–2013) and the HBO comedy-drama series Girls (2013–2014).

== Early life ==
Appleby's Israeli-born mother is of Moroccan Jewish descent, and her father is Canadian and of Ashkenazi Jewish descent; he is from Los Angeles. During her youth, her mother worked as a Hebrew school teacher, while her father worked as a tour guide at Universal Studios Hollywood. She grew up in what she says was a "middle-class" household in Calabasas, California and kept kosher in her home. She attended Hebrew school and had a bat mitzvah.

Shiri Appleby graduated from Calabasas High School in Calabasas in1997. She attended University of Southern California from 1998 to 1999, where she studied English. After two years she got the starring role in Roswell and was working steadily, but while shooting Life Unexpected in 2010, Appleby started to work towards a psychology degree from the online University of Phoenix. It took her 14 months, while also working, to complete the degree in 2012.

== Career ==
Appleby began her acting career at the age of four, starting with advertisements for various products including Cheerios and M&M's. She began acting and taking acting classes because her parents were concerned that she was so shy and introverted. Her first advertisement was for Raisin Bran, but it was never aired. She made guest appearances on many television programs, most notably thirtysomething (1987), Doogie Howser, M.D. (1989), ER (1994), Baywatch (1989), Xena: Warrior Princess (1995), 7th Heaven (1997), Beverly Hills, 90210 (1990), before landing her break-out role in the series Roswell (1999–2002), where she tried out for the roles of Isabel and Maria before landing the leading role of Liz Parker.

Appleby has been featured in a number of music videos, including Bon Jovi's video for "It's My Life" with Will Estes, and the 2004 video for the song "I Don't Want to Be" by Gavin DeGraw, opposite Scott Mechlowicz. She appeared in Sense Field's music video for "Save Yourself," which is part of the Roswell soundtrack and featured in the first season DVD box set. In 2006, she had a recurring role on the short-lived ABC drama Six Degrees as Anya, a young assistant in a relationship with a much older photographer. Later in the same year, she played Hildy Young in the new USA Network series To Love and Die, that began airing in late December 2008. She also participated in a short film called Carjacking directed by Dan Passman and co-starring Geoff Stults. In 2007, she appeared in the movie What Love Is alongside Cuba Gooding Jr., Matthew Lillard, and Anne Heche. Appleby participated in another short film Love Like Wind from Shaolin Film Productions. At the end of 2007, she appeared as Charlie Wilson's press secretary in the film Charlie Wilson's War, which stars Tom Hanks and Julia Roberts. In 2008, Appleby had a recurring role on the 15th and final season of ER (her second time on the show), playing an intern named Daria Wade.

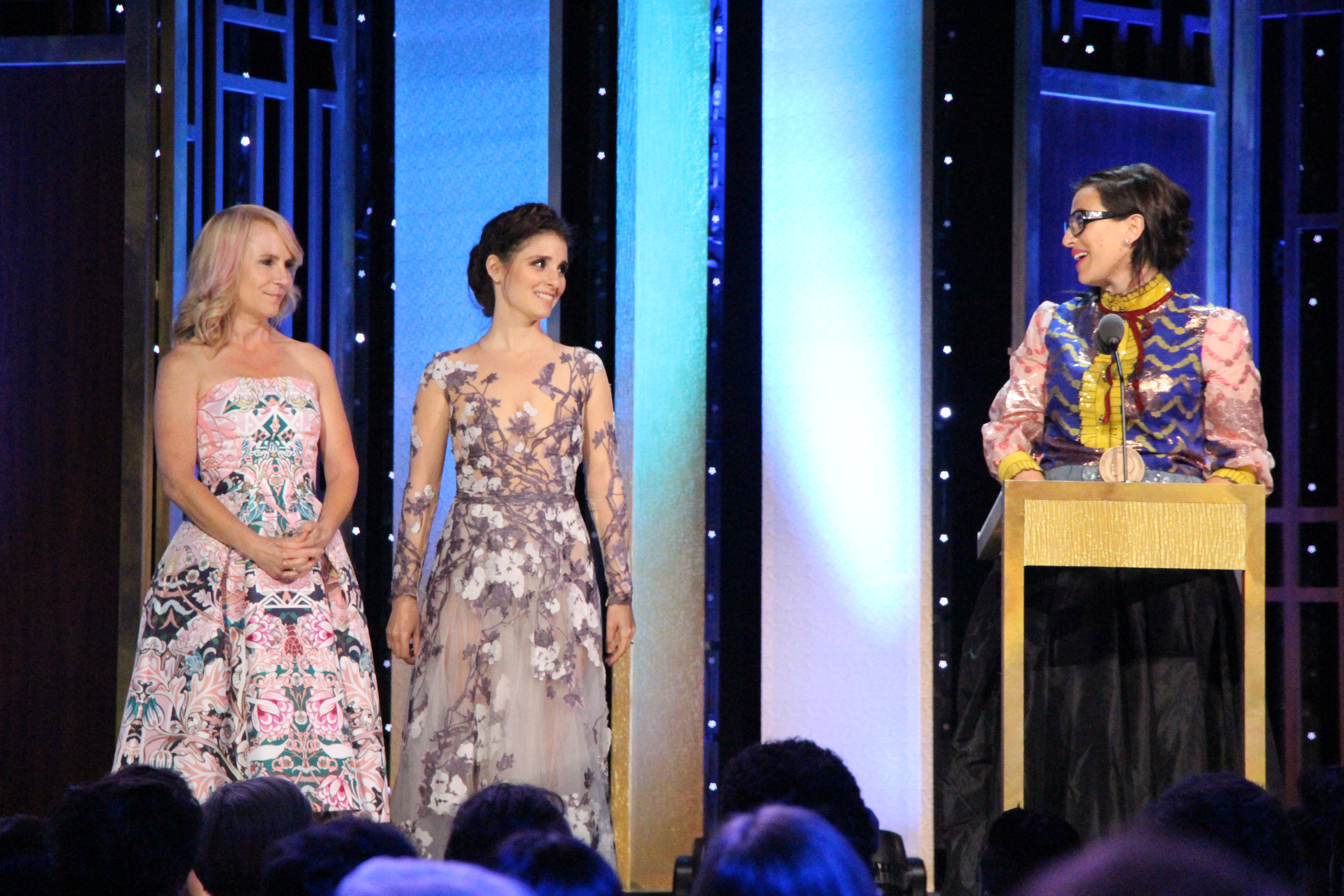
Marti Noxon, Appleby (center) and Sarah Gertrude Shapiro at the 2016 Peabody Awards held at Cipriani Wall Street in Downtown Manhattan, New York

In 2010, Appleby starred in The CW network drama Life Unexpected as Cate Cassidy, a radio talk show host whose daughter whom she gave up for adoption becomes a part of her life. The show was canceled after two seasons. In 2012, she starred as the main character of Dating Rules from My Future Self, which she also produced.

In 2013, she had a role in the Lena Dunham's Girls, an HBO series including a controversial "money shot" scene. She said the role allowed her to break out of a career where she was often typecast as being sweet. Appleby said that she was invited to read for a role when she was on the set of Girls because she was interested in directing and shadowed director Jesse Peretz. After a table read with the cast, she was offered a part.

In 2013, she was cast in the leading role in Unreal, a Lifetime series about the inner workings of a reality program (a show within a show), which premiered on June 1, 2015. It was produced by former The Bachelor producer, Sarah Gertrude Shapiro, a former producer of The Bachelor, and writer Marti Noxon. Appleby said that she spent time with a producer to quiz them about the work as part of researching her role as a reality dating show producer. She said that one of the appeals of the show was that the central focus was not about her character being in a romantic relationship. The show received strong reviews and was picked up for four seasons. In 2016, Appleby directed her first episode of Unreal, titled "Casualty". She directed multiple episodes of the series. In July 2018, the series ended. In 2017, Appleby starred in Janicza Bravo's first full-length feature, Lemon, which debuted at Sundance Film Festival in Park City, Utah. In 2021, Appleby had a cameo role in the last scene of Season 3 Episode 13 of Roswell, New Mexico, having directed an episode in each of the first two seasons of Roswell.

== Personal life ==
Appleby gave birth to a girl in March 2013. Appleby and chef and restaurateur Jon Shook, the baby's father, later married. Their second child, a son, was born in December 2015. In Hebrew, the word shiri means "my song" or "my poem" and it may simply mean "sing" (second person female imperative). Appleby said her parents said that when she was born, she was like a song in their hearts.

She has a scar above her left eyebrow that she got when a neighbor's dog bit her when she was young. Getting over her fear of dogs, she went on the show Emergency Vets, accompanying staff veterinarian Kevin Fitzgerald (she overcame another phobia in the same episode by holding a live snake, one of Fitzgerald's patients).

=== Films ===
Year	Title	Role	Notes
1987	The Killing Time	Annie Winslow	
1989	Curse II: The Bite	Grace Newman	
1990	I Love You to Death	Millie	
1993	Family Prayers	Nina	
1999	The Other Sister	Free sample girl	
1999	The Thirteenth Floor	Bridget Manilla	
1999	Deal of a Lifetime	Laurie Petler	
2002	A Time for Dancing	Samantha "Sam" Russell	
2002	Swimfan	Amy Miller	
2003	The Battle of Shaker Heights	Sarah	
2003	The Skin Horse	Carla	
2004	Undertow	Violet	
2005	When Do We Eat?	Nikki	
2005	Havoc	Amanda	
2006	I-See-You.Com	Randi Sommers	
2006	I'm Reed Fish	Jill Cavanaugh	
2006	Carjacking	Az/Cary	Short film
2007	The Killing Floor	Rebecca Fay	
2007	What Love Is	Debbie	
2007	Charlie Wilson's War	Jailbait	
2007	Love Like Wind	The Ghost	Short film
2012	The Happiest Person in America	Susan	Short film
2013	Seven Minutes to Save the World	Caroline	Short film
2015	The Devil's Candy	Astrid Hellman	
2016	The Meddler	TV Daughter	
2016	An Entanglement	Violet Novak	Short film
2017	Lemon	Ruthie	
2023	Your Place or Mine	Vanessa	

=== Television ===
Year	Title	Role	Notes
1985	Santa Barbara	Little Girl	Episode #359
1987	Blood Vows: The Story of a Mafia Wife	Unknown	TV movie
1987	Thirtysomething	Little Hope	Episode: "The Parents Are Coming"
1988	Mystery Magical Special	Shiri	TV special
1988	Go Toward the Light	Jessica	TV movie
1988	The Bronx Zoo	Nicole	2 episodes
1988	Freddy's Nightmares – A Nightmare on Elm Street: The Series	Marsha at 10	Episode: "Freddy's Tricks and Treats"
1988	Dear John	Girl	Episode: "Hello/Goodbye"
1989	Knight & Daye	Amy Escobar	Main cast
1989	Who's the Boss?	Kid #1	Episode: "To Tony, with Love" (season 6)
1990	Knots Landing	Mary Frances – age 10	2 episodes
1990	The New Adam-12	Debbie Lavender	Episode: "Teach the Children"
1991	Sunday Dinner	Rachel	Main cast
1992	Perfect Family	Steff	TV movie
1993	Doogie Howser, M.D.	Molly Harris	Episode: "Love Makes the World Go 'Round... or Is It Money?"
1993	Raven	Jess	Episode: "The Guardians of the Night"
1993	Against the Grain	Claire	Episode: "Pilot"
1994	ER	Ms. Murphy	Episode: "24 Hours"
1995	Brotherly Love	Fairy #1	Episode: "A Midsummer's Nightmare"
1997	Baywatch	Jennie	Episode: "Hot Water"
1997	7th Heaven	Karen	Episode: "Girls Just Want to Have Fun"
1997	City Guys	Cindy	Episode: "Bye Mom"
1998	Xena: Warrior Princess	Tara	2 episodes
1999	Beverly Hills, 90210	René	Episode: "Local Hero"
1999	Movie Stars	Lori	Episode: "Pilot" (scenes deleted)
1999–2002	Roswell	Liz Parker	Main cast
2000	The Amanda Show	Nerd	2 episodes
2000	Batman Beyond	Cynthia (voice)	Episode: "Terry's Friend Dates a Robot"
2004	Darklight	Lilith/Elle	TV movie
2005	Everything You Want	Abby Morrison	TV movie, a.k.a. Love Surreal
2005	Pizza My Heart	Gina Prestolani	TV movie
2006	Thrill of the Kill	Kelly Holden	TV movie
2006–2007	Six Degrees	Anya	Recurring role
2008	Welcome to The Captain	Heather	Episode: "The Wrecking Crew"
2008	Fear Itself	Tracy	Episode: "Community"
2008	To Love and Die	Hildy Young	TV movie
2009	Unstable	Megan Walker	TV movie
2008–2009	ER	Dr. Daria Wade	Recurring role
2010–2011	Life Unexpected	Cate Cassidy	Main cast
2011	Royal Pains	Stella	Episode: "Rash Talk"
2012	Franklin & Bash	Emily Adams	2 episodes
2012–2013	Chicago Fire	Clarice Carthage	Recurring role
2013	Kristin's Christmas Past	Kristin Cartwell	TV movie
2013	Law & Order: Special Victims Unit	Amelia Albers	Episode: "Military Justice"
2013–2014	Girls	Natalia	Recurring role
2014	Elementary	Dalit Zirin	Episode: "The Hound of the Cancer Cells"
2015–2018	Unreal	Rachel Goldberg	Main cast
2015	Code Black	Carla Niven	Recurring role
2019	Law & Order: Special Victims Unit	Kitty Bennett	Episode: "Dearly Beloved"
2019	Drunk History	Margaret Howe Lovatt	Episode: "Drugs"
2021–2022	Roswell, New Mexico	Dr. Allie Meyers	Recurring role

=== Web ===
Year	Title	Role	Notes
2005	Quarterlife	Debra	Unknown episodes
2011	Whole Day Down	Moon	Episode: "Genesis"
2012	Dating Rules from My Future Self	Lucy Lambert	10 episodes, also producer (seasons 1 & 2)

=== Director ===
Year	Title	Episode(s)	Notes
2012	Dating Rules from My Future Self	"The Last Shrimp"	
2012	Sketchy	"Got the Check"	
2016–2018	Unreal	4 episodes	
2019–2020	Roswell, New Mexico	2 episodes	
2019	Pretty Little Liars: The Perfectionists	"Lost and Found"	
2019	Light as a Feather	2 episodes	
2020	Mixed-ish	Episode: "Doctor! Doctor!"	
2021–2022	New Amsterdam	2 episodes	
2021–2024	Grown-ish	8 episodes	
2021–2022	The Wonder Years	2 episodes	
2021	Queens	Episode: "Who You Calling a Bitch?"	
2022	Black-ish	Episode: "My Work Friend's Wedding"	
2022–2023	Young Sheldon	4 episodes	
2022	Maggie	Episode: "A Mysterious Invitation Awaits You"	
2023	Unprisoned	2 episodes	
2023	Minx	Episode: "A Stately Pleasure Done Decree"	
2026	9-1-1	2 episodes	
2026	The Hawk	2 episodes	

== Accolades ==
Year	Association	Category	Work	Result
1993	Young Artist Awards	Best Young Actress in a Cable Movie	Perfect Family	Nominated
2014	Online Film & Television Association	OFTA Television Award for Best Guest Actress in a Drama Series	Law & Order: Special Victims Unit	Nominated
2016	Critics' Choice Television Awards	Critics' Choice Television Award for Best Actress in a Drama Series	Unreal	Nominated
2016	Women's Image Network Awards	WIN Award for Outstanding Show Directed By a Woman	Unreal	Nominated
