= Margaret Howe Lovatt =

American animal behavior scientist

- Born: Margaret C. Howe; 1942 (age 83–84); Saint Thomas, U.S. Virgin Islands
- Occupation: Naturalist
- Known for: Living with and attempting to teach Peter (a bottlenose dolphin) to speak in the 1960s, as part of a John C. Lilly project
- Children: 3

Margaret Howe Lovatt (née Margaret C. Howe; born 1942) is an American former volunteer naturalist from Saint Thomas, U.S. Virgin Islands. In the 1960s, she took part in a NASA-funded research project in which she attempted to teach a dolphin named Peter to understand and mimic human speech. As a child, she was inspired by a book called Miss Kelly, a story about a cat who communicated with humans. This inspired her to research teaching animals to speak human language.

== Dolphinarium ==
When she was in her early 20s, Lovatt lived on the Caribbean island of St. Thomas, where there was a laboratory to research dolphins. The director of the laboratory, Gregory Bateson, allowed her to observe dolphin behavior, and was impressed by her enthusiasm and diligence as an observer despite her lack of scientific training. While volunteering at the laboratory, she met John C. Lilly, a neuroscientist with the California Institute of Technology. He was building a research laboratory with funding from NASA and the United States Navy with the goal of speaking to extraterrestrial life forms. In order to simulate this situation, he built a "Dolphinarium", a dolphin-house flooded with water, on Saint Thomas. There Lilly accommodated three dolphins, two females named Sissy and Pamela and one younger male bottlenose dolphin named Peter. All of them were taken from Marine Studios and had been co-starring in the television show Flipper. In 1964, the "Dolphinarium" was fully functional, and as Lilly was often traveling, he assigned Lovatt to train the dolphins.

The goal of the "Dolphinarium" experiment was to teach dolphins human language. Over a period of two years, Lilly and Lovatt, both with very different approaches, tried to prove that human language could be mimicked by dolphins. Lovatt reasoned that if she lived with the dolphins and made human-like sounds, similar to how a mother teaches her child to speak, they would have more success. She tried speaking slowly and changing the pitch of her tone to help Peter pronounce the words that she wanted him to learn. Lovatt and the pubescent male dolphin Peter spent all their time together in the isolated "Dolphinarium" where she documented Peter's progress with her twice-daily lessons and encouragement to say the words "Hello Margaret". According to Lovatt, the "m" sound was extremely difficult for Peter to pronounce without making bubbles in the water.

Lovatt's experiments, and her relationship with Peter the dolphin, were documented in Christopher Riley's documentary The Girl Who Talked to Dolphins.

== Complications ==
Peter, being an adolescent dolphin, frequently had sexual urges which disrupted his lessons, and taking Peter to a downstairs pool with two female dolphins proved to be a logistical issue for Lovatt. Eventually, Lovatt relieved Peter's urges herself, stating "It wasn't sexual on my part. Sensuous perhaps. It seemed to me that it made the bond closer. Not because of the sexual activity, but because of the lack of having to keep breaking. And that's really all it was. I was there to get to know Peter. That was part of Peter ... It would just become part of what was going on, like an itch, just get rid of that scratch and we would be done and move on."

An article titled "Interspecies Sex: Humans and Dolphins" appeared in the magazine Hustler that dramatized the situation and reflected badly on their research.

Other problems arose surrounding the project. In addition to Lovatt's animal communication research, Lilly had been funded to research the effects of the drug LSD. Lilly had been testing the effects of the drug on subject dolphins, with no results. Since neither his communication experiments nor his LSD research were proving fruitful, Lilly's Dolphinarium eventually lost all funding. Due to the lack of funding, the dolphins were moved to a different facility in a repurposed bank building in Miami.

In smaller tanks, and since the building lacked sunlight and space, Peter quickly deteriorated and eventually "committed suicide", in John Lilly's words. Dolphin activist Ric O'Barry explains, "Dolphins are not automatic air-breathers like we [humans] are... Every breath is a conscious effort. If life becomes too unbearable, the dolphins just take a breath and they sink to the bottom. They don't take the next breath."

== Personal life ==
Lovatt stayed on the island and married a photographer who had photographed their research. They later moved back into the Dolphinarium and converted it into a family home. Together they had three daughters.

== In popular culture ==
The story was parodied in the Saturday Night Live sketch "The Dolphin Who Learned to Speak". The story is also mentioned in the Rick and Morty episode "Final DeSmithation".

Margaret Howe Lovatt was portrayed by Shiri Appleby in the "Drugs" episode of the TV series Drunk History, with an inebriated Duncan Trussell telling the story.

In Last Week Tonight with John Oliver, Lovatt's involvement with Peter was mentioned during a story on Iran's so-called 'possession' of kamikaze dolphins.
