= Darklight (film) =

2004 film directed by Bill Platt

Darklight is a 2004 American horror film that has links to the Lilith Jewish myth. In the movie, Lilith (Shiri Appleby) and William Shaw (Richard Burgi) join forces to kill the Demonicus, an evil beast that is starting a worldwide plague.

== Premise ==
Lilith is introduced as Elle, a young woman who lives with a guardian. She has no memory of who she is. Lilith is the first woman created by God. She rejected Adam's belief that he was better than her. God turned her into an immortal demoness who kills the children of Adam and Eve. A secret society, The Faith, was created to destroy Lilith.

After murdering the young son of Faith Agent William Shaw, Lilith was captured by Shaw, but The Faith chose to let her live. Instead they blocked her memory and powers, and placed her with a foster family as Elle.

When the ambitious yet evil scientist Anders Raeborne (David Hewlett) used an extract from Lilith's blood in an attempt to become immortal, he became the evil Demonicus, a powerful monster who transmitted a red plague with his bite and tongue. The leaders of Faith, The Prefect (Ross Manarchy) and Chapel (John de Lancie), assigned Chief Agent William Shaw to help Lilith regain her memories and train her to destroy Demonicus and bring his head to develop an antidote.

== Cast ==
- Shiri Appleby as Lilith / Elle, Young woman tasked with saving the world.
- Richard Burgi as William Shaw, Lilith's reluctant partner.
- John de Lancie as Faith Director Chapel
- David Hewlett as Anders Raeborne, The main villain of the movie and a scientist who seeks to become immortal at all costs, only for him to end up transforming into an entity known as the Demonicus.
- Ross Manarchy as The Prefect
- Valentin Ganev as Beckham
