= Cali DeWitt =

Artist in California, US

Cali DeWitt (born Michael Andrew DeWitt) is an artist, designer, and blogger who lives in Los Angeles.

== Life and career ==
Dewitt was born in Sidney, British Columbia, on Vancouver Island. He moved to Los Angeles, California at the age of three. Dewitt grew up in the San Fernando Valley and moved to New York at the age of 19 after going on tour with the band Hole. Dewitt lived briefly in Seattle while working as Frances Bean Cobain's nanny. DeWitt appears in drag on the CD of Nirvana's In Utero.

DeWitt moved back to Los Angeles and at 21, he worked in A&R at Geffen Records for a short time. He worked at the Los Angeles music venue Jabberjaw. He co-founded the label Teenage Teardrops in 2006 with Bryan Ray.

In 2008 DeWitt and David Kramer opened an art gallery in Echo Park called Hope Gallery.

For the 2015 LA Art Book Fair, DeWitt made a large mural with the text "CRYING AT THE ORGY" and an edition with printed matter called "ADULT BOOKS".

In 2016 DeWitt created the merchandise for Kanye West's The Life of Pablo Tour.

== Music videos directed by DeWitt ==
- Destruction Unit – "Final Flight" (2015)
- Antwon – "Don't Care" (2014)
- Hoax – "Fantasy" (2014)
- Iceage – "The Lord's Favorite" (2014)
- Omar Souleyman – "Warni Warni" (2014)
- Lust For Youth – "Illume" (2014)
- Dying In The Pussy – Antwon feat. Andre Martel (2014)
- Hunx & His Punx – "Street Punk Trilogy" (2013)
- King Tuff – "Keep On Movin'" (2013)
- King Tuff – "Bad Thing" (2012)
- Living Comfortably – "Dunes" (2012)

== Album art ==
- John Wies – Seven Of Wands (CD, Album, Ltd) Pan, 2011
- SQRM – Rodeo (12", Album, W/Lbl, Whi) Youth Attack, 2010
- the Repos – Lost Still Losing (Cass, Album, RM, S/Sided, Ltd) Youth Attack, 2013
- Hunx and His Punx – Street Punk (LP, Album, Ltd, Yel), Hardly Art, 2013
- Hoax – Hoax, (12-inch LP) Hoax Records, 2013
- Faith No More – "Motherfucker" (7-inch single) Reclamation! Recordings, Ipecac Recordings, 2014
- "On Doing An Evil Deed Blues" (7-inch EP) Ormolycka, 2014
- Heavy Hearted In The Doldrums (LP, Pic, Album) UNIF 2014 (photo on picture disk)

== Publications ==
- Station Fire, Made in Los Angeles Between August and December 2009 (by Jenna Thornhill and Cali Dewitt)
- White Girl (MTHM Books) 2013
- When I Die 2010, (Cali Dewitt & Mark Mccoy)
- This Natural World (Family) 2010
- War News 2011 (Cali and Jenna Thornhill-Dewitt)
- Pissing contest 2012
- Pit Bull News (wssf) 2014
- New Rose in Town (Hess Press) 2013
- Grave Yard (And Press) 2014
