= Unreal (TV series) =

2015 American drama television series

- Genre: Drama
- Created by: Marti Noxon; Sarah Gertrude Shapiro
- Based on: Sequin Raze by Sarah Gertrude Shapiro
- Starring: Shiri Appleby; Constance Zimmer; Craig Bierko; Freddie Stroma; Jeffrey Bowyer-Chapman; Johanna Braddy; Aline Elasmar; Nathalie Kelley; Josh Kelly; Ashley Scott; Breeda Wool; B. J. Britt; Monica Barbaro; Denée Benton; Kim Matula; Michael Rady; Meagan Tandy; Gentry White; Genevieve Buechner; Adam Demos; Bart Edwards; Brennan Elliott; Caitlin FitzGerald; Alex Hernandez; Alex Sparrow; François Arnaud; Natalie Hall; Meagan Holder; Alejandro Muñoz
- Composer: Fil Eisler
- Country of origin: United States
- Original language: English
- No. of seasons: 4
- No. of episodes: 38 (list of episodes)

Production
- Executive producers: Marti Noxon; Robert M. Sertner; Sarah Gertrude Shapiro; Bill Davenport; Sally DeSipio; Stacy Rukeyser
- Production location: Vancouver, British Columbia, Canada
- Running time: 42 minutes
- Production companies: A+E Studios; Wieden-Kennedy Entertainment; Tiny Pyro; Frank and Bob Films II

Original release
- Network: Lifetime
- Release: June 1, 2015 – April 23, 2018
- Network: Hulu
- Release: July 16, 2018

Unreal (stylized as UnREAL) is an American drama television series that premiered on Lifetime on June 1, 2015. It stars Shiri Appleby as a young reality television producer pushed by her unscrupulous boss (Constance Zimmer) to swallow her integrity and do anything it takes to drum up salacious content for their dating reality show Everlasting. The show was created by Marti Noxon and Sarah Gertrude Shapiro, and was inspired by Shapiro's award-winning independent short film Sequin Raze.

On July 28, 2017, it was announced that Unreal had been renewed for a shortened fourth season of eight episodes. The fourth season completed production in January 2018 before the third season had aired. By May 22, 2018, the fourth season had been acquired by Hulu. The streaming service distributed the series exclusively as a "Hulu Original" in the United States for a set period of time before the episodes aired on Lifetime. On July 16, 2018, the fourth season was released on Hulu and it was confirmed that the season would be the series' last.

== Plot ==
Producer Rachel Goldberg returns to Everlasting, a popular dating show, after a breakdown. With a reputation to rebuild and executive producer Quinn King breathing down her neck, Rachel must pull out all the stops in what she does best: manipulating the contestants to create the outrageous drama that viewers expect.

== Cast and characters ==
Season 1 cast photo (from l. to r.: Kelly, Braddy, Zimmer, Appleby, Stroma, Scott, Kelley)

=== Main ===
==== Crew ====
- Shiri Appleby as Rachel Goldberg, a producer on Everlasting who is brought back to the show by executive producer Quinn despite Rachel's breakdown during the previous season. Though conflicted by how she must lie to and manipulate the contestants, Rachel is a "closer" who thinks fast on her feet and knows exactly what needs to be done to create drama on the show. Meanwhile, she is drawn back to her ex-boyfriend Jeremy and finds herself getting close to the show's suitor Adam, but she later loses relationships to both of them. Rachel is later promoted to supervising producer, which is short-lived as Coleman is hired by the network as the new showrunner.
- Constance Zimmer as Quinn King, Everlasting's scheming, demanding executive producer who pushes boundaries on the show to maximize ratings. She is having an affair with Chet, but their dysfunctional relationship is strained by his marriage and their work. She later gets promoted to showrunner until Chet returns, and their conflict results in the network hiring Coleman as the show's new EP and showrunner.
- Craig Bierko as Chet Wilton, the eccentric and drug-using creator of Everlasting who is having a volatile affair with Quinn. His immaturity, vulgarity and callousness have given him a keen eye for what the audience wants, but his tremendous success has only fueled his self-destructive self-indulgence. He gets banned from work for his bad behavior behind-the-scenes, but later returns after adopting a healthier lifestyle, putting himself into direct conflict with Quinn. He also joins the men's liberation movement, and enlists Jeremy as part of his cause. The following season, he starts dating a swimsuit model named Crystal.
- Jeffrey Bowyer-Chapman as Jay Carter, a gay producer on Everlasting who is initially one of Rachel's only friends. He soon crosses Quinn, and becomes more willing to step over the line in order to ingratiate himself to Chet. He later becomes jealous of Rachel for her job promotion, and grows frustrated by competing against a newly promoted Madison. He later produces his own show, Passport to Dance.
- Josh Kelly as Jeremy Caner (seasons 1–3), a camera operator (later promoted to director of photography) on Everlasting, and Rachel's ex-boyfriend. Engaged to the show's make-up artist, Lizzie, at the beginning of the series, he still has unresolved feelings for Rachel. He briefly gets back together with Rachel, but breaks up with her after he finds out that she cheated on him with Adam. He returns to work on the new season a bitter and angry drunk over having his heart broken by Rachel.
- Genevieve Buechner as Madison (seasons 3–4, recurring seasons 1–2), Quinn's meek production assistant who had oral sex with Chet and is later promoted to junior producer on Everlasting, and later to Junior Vice President of Non-Scripted at the network, working under Fiona Berlin. Through the rapid progression in her career, she quickly learns to become more confident and conniving to get what she wants. As Vice President, she also produces her own show, #Adulting.
- Brennan Elliott as Graham (seasons 3–4, recurring seasons 1–2), the host of Everlasting.
- Aline Elasmar as Shia (season 1), a producer on Everlasting who has a professional rivalry with Rachel. Initially earnest with her take on contestant storylines, she soon learns that she has to be more ruthless and manipulative—like Rachel—to compete and succeed. To this end, she gets Maya drunk and tampers with Mary's mood stabilizing medication, but loses control of the outcome. She is sent home after the last of her assigned contestants quits.
- Michael Rady as Coleman Wasserman (season 2), an executive producer and new showrunner on Everlasting who was a documentary filmmaker prior to joining the show. He and Rachel become a couple and briefly date, but she worries when Coleman makes it clear he wants to destroy the show by publicly exposing its past crimes committed by the producers. He is later killed (along with Yael) by Jeremy when he rigs his car that crashes on the road.
- Francois Arnaud as Tommy Castelli (season 4), a devious new producer on Everlasting who is brought in to handle the new games format for the show's All Stars season. He proves to be a match for Rachel's underhanded manipulation techniques, and eventually starts a relationship with her, leading to their engagement. In the series finale, Quinn scapegoats him as a rogue producer to protect Rachel.

==== Suitor ====
- Freddie Stroma as Adam Cromwell (season 1; guest star season 2), a rich British playboy and the "suitor" on Everlasting. He is reluctant to do the show, but is hoping the publicity will improve his "bad boy" reputation and help with his business ventures. As Adam becomes savvy to the producers' manipulations and what will make the show "better", he alternately plays along, and does some kindnesses to individual contestants. He also begins to develop an attraction to Rachel and has an affair with her, but it ultimately ends in heartbreak when he later finds out from her boss Quinn about her fragile mental health, and she convinces him to end his affair with Rachel.
- B. J. Britt as Darius Beck (season 2), the first African-American suitor on Everlasting and a professional football player, who hopes that being on Everlasting will help polish his image after being involved in a public relations scandal.
- Caitlin FitzGerald as Serena Wolcott (season 3), Everlasting's first female suitor who is a successful Silicon Valley venture capitalist, who comes on the show to seek a husband when she is tired of being single.

==== Contestants ====
- Johanna Braddy as Anna Martin (season 1), a bulimic contestant who works as an attorney. She almost leaves Everlasting when her father dies, but she is coaxed back by Rachel with feigned assurances that she will likely win.
- Nathalie Kelley as Grace (season 1), a contestant who is a swimsuit model. She and Adam have an immediate sexual attraction, although Quinn does not see her as an acceptable winner for the competition.
- Ashley Scott as Mary Newhouse (season 1), one of the oldest contestants who is a single mother with an abusive ex-husband. Quinn, finding Mary uninteresting, pushes her to step up her game, not knowing that Shia has tampered with Mary's mood stabilizing medication and given her alcohol. Bipolar and struggling with post-traumatic stress disorder, Mary begins to unravel under the pressure put on her by the manipulations of Rachel, Quinn, Shia, and Chet.
- Breeda Wool as Faith Duluth (season 1, guest season 4), a contestant who is a shy and insecure Christian virgin.
- Monica Barbaro as Yael/"Hot Rachel" (season 2), a contestant who is an undercover reporter (posing as a fashion blogger), and who the crew labels as a more attractive, less damaged, sane version of Rachel.
- Denée Benton as Ruby Carter (season 2), an outspoken Black Lives Matter activist who joins Everlasting looking to use the show to promote her message and, against all odds, falls in love and ends up with Darius.
- Kim Matula as Tiffany James (season 2), a contestant who is the wealthy daughter of an NFL team owner who hopes that being on Everlasting will help her step out of her father's shadow.
- Meagan Tandy as Chantal (season 2), a contestant who is a beautiful and sophisticated southern debutante who is recovering from the death of her fiancé.
- Bart Edwards as Jasper Hunt (season 3), a contestant who is a successful Wall Street investment banker who seems like he will make the perfect power couple with Serena.
- Alex Hernandez as Owen Boyd (season 3), a contestant who is a firefighter and a single father looking for love.
- Adam Demos as August Walker (seasons 3–4), a contestant who was a surfer who joined the Peace Corps to save the world. He returns for the show's All Stars season.
- Alex Sparrow as Alexi Petrov (season 3, recurring season 4), a secretly bisexual contestant who is a "bad boy" ballet dancer and an ostensibly recovering cocaine addict. He returns for the show's All Stars season, and stars on Jay's new reality show Passport to Dance.
- Natalie Hall as Candy Coco (season 4), an outspoken contestant who is a single mother and stripper. Although she had never been on the show before, she is invited to All Stars by Quinn as a cross-promotional tactic to market another reality show she's set to star in, Stripper Queens, under the pretense of her being a superfan of Everlasting.
- Meagan Holder as Noelle Jackson (season 4), a fan favorite All Stars contestant who had previously been runner up on her original season. She hopes to have a second chance with her original season's suitor, Rodrigo, who is also set to be on All Stars.
- Alejandro Munoz as Rodrigo (season 4), a flirtatious and charismatic soccer player, All Stars contestant and former suitor.

==== Other regulars ====
- Gentry White as Romeo Beck (season 2), Darius' cousin and manager who moves into the Everlasting mansion with him.

=== Recurring ===
- Amy Hill as Dr. Hillary Wagerstein (seasons 1–2), a therapist employed by the show who feeds the producers personal information about the contestants to better manipulate dramatic moments from them.
- Martin Cummins as Brad (seasons 1–2), an executive at the network that airs Everlasting, who was later fired by the network after Chet returned to work.
- Mimi Kuzyk as Dr. Olive Goldberg(seasons 1–3), Rachel's controlling psychiatrist mother.
- Donavon Stinson as Dan, the assistant director of Everlasting.
- Christopher Cousins as Gary Taylor (season 2–3), the president of the television network that airs Everlasting.
- Tracie Thoms as Fiona Berlin (season 3–4), a high-end executive who is a lesbian and a close friend of Quinn since early in their careers. She later becomes the President of the television network after Gary is fired.
- Tom Brittney as Roger Lockwood (guest season 1, recurring season 4), a friend of Adam's who appears on Everlasting as a guest. He rapes a contestant on the show, Maya. Rachel later invites him back for All Stars, despite him not being an actual contestant, hoping to manufacture drama surrounding the incident.
- Natasha Wilson as Maya (season 1, season 4), a contestant who is a sommelier. Shia gets her drunk which results in Maya being raped by Adam's friend Roger. Rachel invites both her and Roger back for All Stars in the hopes that she would confront Roger on television.

==== Season 1 ====
- Arielle Kebbel as Britney, a contestant whom Quinn brands "the villain" and is one of the first eliminated from Everlasting. Chet brings her back for the finale as a wild card.
- Siobhan Williams as Lizzie, a make-up artist on Everlasting and Jeremy's fiancée until he breaks up with her on realising he still has feelings for Rachel.
- Christie Laing as Shamiqua, a contestant who is a clerk for a Supreme Court Justice.
- J. R. Bourne as Bill DeYoung, Quinn's former writing partner and ex-boyfriend, who is a recovering alcoholic.
- Stephanie Bennett as Pepper, a contestant who is an elementary school teacher.
- Sonya Salomaa as Cynthia Wilton, Chet's ex-wife.
- Graeme McComb as Sam, the assistant director of Everlasting.
- Andrea Brooks as Tanya, a contestant on Everlasting.
- Natasha Burnett as Athena, a contestant on Everlasting who is hoping to use the publicity to open a salon. Jay encourages her to play up to the "black bitch" stereotype in order to get noticed.

==== Season 2 ====
- BJ Britt as Darius, the “suitor” -a well known African-American football player who is trying to save his image after a soured interview with a reporter.
- Ioan Gruffudd as John Booth, an optimistic and adventurous tech billionaire who owns the television network that airs Everlasting.
- Karissa Tynes as Jameson, a contestant who is a police officer dedicated to her job, but she hopes that her chemistry with Darius will help fill the missing void in her love life.
- Lindsay Musil as Beth Ann, a contestant from a small town in Alabama who speaks her mind without a filter, and is cast on the show to stir up controversy.
- Monique Ganderton as Brandi, a shy contestant who overcame a traumatic past to become a mixed martial arts fighter.
- Elizabeth Whitmere as Dominique, a contestant who is a professional basketball player and a serious contender for Darius since they have a lot in common as professional athletes.
- Jessica Sipos as Hayley, a contestant who is a physical therapist and is sexually adventurous, loves yoga, and is a healer.
- Sunita Prasad as London, a contestant who is an engineer with a conservative personality who joins the cast of Everlasting to explore her wild side.

==== Season 3 ====
- Brandon Jay McLaren as Dr. Simon, a psychologist who was a former corporate crisis counselor who is hired by Quinn to work on Everlasting and to treat Rachel.
- Melvin Gregg as Zach Taylor, a contestant who is a charming social media star.
- Terry Chen as Guy Moretti, a contestant who is a tattooed chef who is looking for any way to get ahead on Everlasting.
- Marcus Rosner as Warren Johnson, a contestant who is a rancher with a cowboy attitude.
- Chelsea Hobbs as Charlie, a camera assistant on Everlasting and Jeremy's girlfriend.
- Kassandra Clementi as Crystal, a swimsuit model and Chet's girlfriend.
- Tyler Hynes as Billy Byrd, a contestant who is a race car driver who lives by his own traditional and conservative values.
- Cameron Bancroft as Preston Palmer, an older contestant who is a Miami real estate tycoon.
- Joe Abraham as Norman, a contestant who is a jockey and a very confident elite athlete.
- Jaime Callica as Xavier Chopin, a dancer and Jay's boyfriend.

==== Season 4 ====
- Christopher Russell as Jack, an All Stars contestant who is a pediatrician. He is a fan favorite on Everlasting, and had previously appeared on two seasons before being invited to All Stars. Rachel confides in him that he was the reason she became a producer on the show.
- Meghan Heffern as Sofia, an All Stars contestant who was previously known as a sweetheart on her original season, but hopes to cultivate a more villainous reputation on her second time.
- Alli Chung as Skye, an abrasive All Stars contestant who enjoys the limelight.
- Karis Cameron as Naomi, an All Stars contestant who is Amish.
- Samantha Cole as Emily, an All Stars contestant.
- Greg Delmage as Luke, an All Stars contestant.
- Maxwell Yip as Joe, an All Stars contestant.

== Episodes ==
Season	Episodes	Originally released		
Season	Episodes	First released	Last released	Network
1	10	June 1, 2015	August 3, 2015	Lifetime
2	10	June 6, 2016	August 8, 2016	Lifetime
3	10	February 26, 2018	April 23, 2018	Lifetime
4	8	July 16, 2018		Hulu

== Production ==
=== Development ===
On July 30, 2013, Lifetime placed a pilot order on Unreal, inspired by Sarah Gertrude Shapiro's award-winning independent short film Sequin Raze. Shapiro had previously worked at the American reality dating series The Bachelor. The pilot was written by Marti Noxon and Shapiro, and directed by Peter O'Fallon. On February 6, 2014, Lifetime officially green-lit Un-Real with a 10-episode series order. In March 2015, the premiere date was announced as June 1, 2015. On July 6, 2015, the series was renewed for a second season of 10 episodes, to premiere in 2016. The second season continued to feature the fictional show, Everlasting, with Quinn and Rachel returning as main characters.

=== Casting ===
Casting announcements began in September 2013, with Shiri Appleby first cast in the lead role of Rachel Goldberg, the young staffer working on the reality dating competition. Freddie Stroma was the next actor cast in the series, in the role of Adam Cromwell, the smart and wealthy bachelor on the dating series. Shortly after, Josh Kelly signed onto the series regular role of Jeremy, Rachel's ex-boyfriend who also works as a cameraman on the reality dating series. Breeda Wool was then added to the cast for the role of Faith, one of the contestants on the series. In early-November, Megyn Price, Nathalie Kelley and Johanna Braddy joined the show's cast. Price signed onto the role of Quinn King, the controlling executive producer on the reality series; Kelley joined in the role of Grace, an eco-swimwear designer/model and contestant on the series; and Braddy set as Anna, a type-A control freak and attorney who is also a contestant on the series. Ashley Scott was later cast in the role of Mary, the single mother of a 4-year-old daughter who joins the series hoping to find love. In June 2014, Price was replaced by Constance Zimmer as Quinn. On July 22, 2014, it was announced that Craig Bierko has been cast as a character named Chet, who is the reality dating show's creator. On August 8, 2014, it was announced that J. R. Bourne and Siobhan Williams were both cast on the show in recurring roles, Bourne as Quinn's recovering drug addict ex-boyfriend and former writing partner, and Williams as Everlasting's new make-up artist who is also Jeremy's fiancée.

== Distribution ==
=== United States ===
Unreal premiered in the United States on Lifetime on June 1, 2015. The network made the first four episodes available on their website on June 6, 2015, before the latter three had aired.

In July 2017, it was announced that the series has been renewed for fourth season that completed production in January 2018 before the third season had aired. On May 22, 2018, it was reported that the fourth season had been acquired by Hulu. The streaming service would distribute the series exclusively as a "Hulu Original" in the United States for a set period of time before the episodes are to air on Lifetime. On July 16, 2018, the fourth season was released on Hulu. In 2024 it streamed on Netflix, only to return in 2025.

=== International ===
The series is available to stream on Stan in Australia and on Lightbox in New Zealand.

In the United Kingdom, season 1 aired on Lifetime. From season 2, the show airs on Amazon Video a day after broadcast in the United States, with season 1 also available for streaming.

In Israel the show airs on yes Drama channel and on Cellcom TV. In India, the show airs on Star World.

In Spain, the show airs on the channel ATRESERIES, owned by the network Atresmedia.

== Concept and characterization ==
Unreal is set behind the scenes of Everlasting, a fictional reality dating series operating similarly to The Bachelor. Dalene Rovenstine of Entertainment Weekly wrote, "UnREAL has comic moments, but is also twisty and dark in a way you hope isn't reflected by real-life reality shows." According to Noxon, the series is based on what really happens in the world of reality show production. Shapiro says, "Viewers want to believe in fairy tales, and those reality shows tap into that want. Our show dismantles that want." Adds Noxon, "We thought uncovering the behind-the-scenes machinations would make great stories, and we wanted to comment on the kind of bully culture of a lot of reality television." Shapiro says of the genre:

Contestants come in and think they can beat the game, but it's truly an unbeatable game ... You're ritually manipulated and charmed and edited beyond your control. Viewers think the contestants knew what they had signed up for. But they couldn't have. There's no way.

Writing for the Associated Press, Frazier Moore described the show's dynamic:

UnREAL dwells in the off-camera netherworld of a dating competition show ... where a handsome bachelor must choose among a bevy of hot, hopeful women each bucking for a fairytale wedding ... The week-to-week production process is anything but romantic. On the contrary, it's a callous game of bullying and illusion whose sole objective is outrageous narratives. That process of seduction is led by executive producer Quinn King ... a single-minded puppetmaster whose chief henchman is Rachel Goldberg ... a young producer whose task is to cajole, badger and play on the weaknesses of the show's participants to get the footage Quinn demands.

Jon Caramanica of The New York Times called Quinn and Rachel "architects of destruction—ostensibly of the people on camera, but really of themselves." Moore noted that, despite the contestants' expectations, "the game is fixed and the matchmaking premise is only a pretext ... [the contestants] are pawns in the Everlasting chess game, with Quinn, in her video-paneled master control, pronouncing which contestant is the designated villainess, which is the hot one, which ones are boring and should be bounced." Appreciating Rachel's "killer instincts" and manipulative skills, Quinn also "plays on Rachel's many weaknesses to keep her in line." Caramanica commented:

UnREAL doesn't exist just to send up reality television, or to pick at its scabs. Nor is it primarily a tell-all about the behind-the-scenes hands that shape reality-TV narrative ... Rather, UnREAL uses that access as a tool to ask questions about these sorts of programs: not just about how they operate—savagely, if its stories are to be believed—but also why participants on both sides of the camera subject themselves to them."

== Reception ==
=== Critical response ===
==== Season 1 ====
Season one of Unreal has received favorable reviews. Merrill Barr of Forbes called it "one of the best new shows of the summer because it embraces the insanity it presents on screen". Dalene Rovenstine of Entertainment Weekly wrote, "If you love The Bachelor, you're going to like UnREAL. If you hate The Bachelor, you're going to like UnREAL." Jon Caramanica of The New York Times called Unreal "acerbic and unrelentingly sad" and "a close and sometimes frustrating study of women tearing other women down". In December 2015, Jeff Jensen of Entertainment Weekly named Unreal as one of his "10 Best New Shows of 2015".

The review aggregator website Rotten Tomatoes lists a 98% approval rating, based on 41 reviews, with a rating average of 8.4/10. The site's consensus states: "The revealing and thought-provoking UnREAL uses reality TV as a suitably soapy springboard for absorbing drama." On Metacritic, the series has a score of 78 out of 100, indicating "generally favorable reviews".

In May 2015, Unreal was one of five honorees in the Most Exciting New Series category at the 5th Critics' Choice Television Awards.

==== Season 2 ====
Season two received acclaim from critics. On the review aggregator Metacritic, the season holds a score of 87 out of 100, indicating "universal acclaim". The review aggregator website Rotten Tomatoes lists an 83% approval rating, based on 38 reviews, with a rating average of 8.6/10. The site's consensus states: "UnREAL is smarter, more shameless, and more confident in its thrilling and riveting second season."

==== Season 3 ====
Season three received generally favorable reviews from critics. On the review aggregator Metacritic, the season received a score of 63 out of 100 from six critics. The review aggregator website Rotten Tomatoes lists a 95% approval rating, based on 21 reviews, with an average rating of 7.86/10. The site's consensus states: "Timely and unapologetic, UnReal continues its satirical skewering with newfound fervor."

=== Accolades ===
Year	Award	Category	Nominee(s)	Result	Ref.
2015	5th Critics' Choice Television Awards	Most Exciting New Series	UnREAL	Won	
2015	16th American Film Institute Awards	Top 10 TV Programs of the Year	UnREAL	Won	
2016	21st Critics' Choice Television Awards	Best Drama Series	UnREAL	Nominated	
2016	21st Critics' Choice Television Awards	Best Actress in a Drama Series	Shiri Appleby	Nominated	
2016	21st Critics' Choice Television Awards	Best Supporting Actress in a Drama Series	Constance Zimmer	Won	
2016	2015 Peabody Awards	Entertainment and Children's Programming	UnREAL	Won	
2016	32nd TCA Awards	Program of the Year	UnREAL	Nominated	
2016	32nd TCA Awards	Outstanding Achievement in Drama	UnREAL	Nominated	
2016	32nd TCA Awards	Outstanding New Program	UnREAL	Nominated	
2016	68th Primetime Emmy Awards	Outstanding Supporting Actress in a Drama Series	Constance Zimmer (for "Mother")	Nominated	
2016	68th Primetime Emmy Awards	Outstanding Writing for a Drama Series	Marti Noxon and Sarah Gertrude Shapiro (for "Return")	Nominated	
2016	22nd Critics' Choice Television Awards	Best Supporting Actress in a Drama Series	Constance Zimmer	Nominated	

== Web series ==
On January 21, 2016, it was announced that Lifetime was developing a Faith-centered spin-off web series, with Breeda Wool reprising her role from the TV series. The 10-webisode series The Faith Diaries premiered on April 13, 2016.
