= Adrian Chase =

DC Comics character

- Adrian Chase as the Vigilante in interior artwork for Vigilante #2 (October 1983). Art by Keith Pollard.

Publication information
- Publisher: DC Comics
- First appearance: As Adrian Chase: The New Teen Titans #23 (September 1982); As Vigilante: The New Teen Titans Annual #2 (August 1983)
- Created by: Marv Wolfman; George Pérez

In-story information
- Alter ego: Adrian Allen Chase
- Species: Metahuman
- Team affiliations: Checkmate
- Notable aliases: Dean Baker
- Abilities: Brilliant marksman; Superb hand-to-hand combatant/martial artist; Regenerative healing powers
The Vigilante
Publication information
- Schedule: Monthly
- Format: Ongoing series
- Genre: Superhero
- Publication date: November 1983 – February 1988
- No. of issues: 50
- Main character: Adrian Chase
Creative team
- Written by: Marv Wolfman, Paul Kupperberg
- Artist(s): Chuck Patton, Tod Smith, Steve Erwin

Adrian Allen Chase is an antihero appearing in American comic books published by DC Comics. He is the second DC character to bear the name Vigilante.

The character made his live-action debut in the Arrowverse series Arrow, portrayed by Josh Segarra, which depicts him as the supervillain Prometheus. Freddie Stroma portrays Chase as Vigilante in the DC Extended Universe and DC Universe television series Peacemaker.

== Creation ==
Marv Wolfman stated the genesis of the character began when writing Daredevil in the 1970s.

"In issue #127, I staged a typical comic book battle between Daredevil and another quasi hero named the Torpedo. As the fight progressed, it moved off the street and into a house, only to come to an abrupt stop when the owner of the house a mother who was protecting her kids screamed that DD and the Torpedo were destroying her home, the two heroes looked at the damage around them and realized that their thoughtless aggression had real world consequences. Years passed; I moved back to DC and was writing The New Teen Titans, and for some reason, I kept thinking about that story and as a result I decided that I wanted to explore the theme of real world consequences for super heroic action as the basis of an entire series rather than just a few panels at the end of a single story. I wanted to deconstruct the clichés of superhero comics and their fight scenes in a long form narrative... To that end, I put together the idea of a law abiding district attorney named Adrian Chase, who was really good at his job, but kept having his court victories overturned on minor technicalities due to a corrupt legal system."

== Publication history ==
Created by writer Marv Wolfman and artist George Pérez, Adrian Chase first appeared in his civilian identity in The New Teen Titans #23 (September 1982), before debuting as Vigilante in The New Teen Titans Annual #2 (August 1983). Chase later appeared in his own Vigilante series, initially written by Wolfman. Paul Kupperberg took over as the series writer with issue #21 (Sept. 1985), scripting it until the series' conclusion with issue #50.

== Fictional character biography ==
Adrian Chase is a New York City district attorney working in partnership with the resident superhero team, the Teen Titans. His wife Doris Chase and their two children (Adam Chase and Drew Chase) are killed by a bomb meant for Adrian, planted at the direction of mob boss Anthony Scarapelli.

Shortly afterward, Chase is approached at his wife's grave by a hooded woman named Lynn. In an origin story that he related to his associates Jonathan "J.J." Davis and Theresa "Terry" Gomez, Chase claimed that Lynn drove him west in a van and forced him to walk for four days through the desert. In a cavern underneath the desert sands, he was greeted by three spirits — "victims of evil who were not content to gracefully die" — named Bloody Knee, Chaka, and Chastity. Chase spent six months with them, enduring incredible physical and spiritual trials. He emerged with new powers and a new sense of purpose — to seek justice his own way as the anti-hero Vigilante: "I go after those proven guilty of crimes who are then released because of some stupid technicality."

Chase was initially shown as taking pains to make sure he did not kill his enemies (unlike Marvel's the Punisher) and would regularly use non-lethal weapons to disable his opponents.

Throughout the Vigilante series, Chase is tormented over the justice of his actions and the pain brought to others. Chase flirted with abandoning his Vigilante identity after he savagely beat an ex-convict who turned out to be innocent. Eventually, Chase abandons his Vigilante identity, believing that he could be both more effective and happier as a judge. But during his absence, the Vigilante identity was assumed by two of his friends (fellow judge Alan Welles and bailiff Dave Winston respectively) without his knowledge.

After Welles kills a police officer and Winston is killed by Peacemaker, Chase once again assumes the Vigilante role, believing it is the only way to protect his loved ones. However, his experiences with Welles and Winston have damaged his fragile psyche beyond repair, causing him to adopt more vicious tactics in his war on crime. Seeking revenge on Peacemaker, the out-of-shape Chase gets beaten in a fight and unmasked on live TV, forcing him even further into the Vigilante role.

Eventually, Chase becomes ever more conflicted over the violence he engages in and the harm he has caused to those around him. He also becomes increasingly mentally unstable — alternating between bouts of enraged violence, paranoia and terrible remorse for his actions, even resorting to murdering innocent police officers who get in his way. His mounting guilt culminates in Chase contemplating the course of his life and then committing suicide.

Chase has remained dead since being killed off and never been resurrected. He appeared in the Day of Judgment limited series as one of the dead heroes in Purgatory. Chase and the others run interference, battling the guardians of the realm, so other living heroes can escape with the soul of Hal Jordan.

The character's death remains in continuity even after The New 52 reboot and the DC Rebirth relaunch, which altered the continuity of the DC Comics universe. In current continuity, Chase was a judge rather than a district attorney.

== Powers and abilities ==
As the Vigilante, Adrian Chase is a known for his expertise in hand-to-hand combat and marksmans skills. He also possesses the ability to heal quickly and regenerate his body from injuries as serious as stabbings or gunshot wounds, although he is capable of dying if the injuries are severe enough.

== Analysis ==
As described by comics critic Donald D. Markstein, upon his introduction Vigilante represented a familiar trope in American comics:

By the 1980s, the guy working in law enforcement, who becomes a superhero because he doesn't want to deal with the silly legal impediments that hamper the pursuit of justice was old hat. Not only had readers seen endless iterations of the theme (such as the Black Hood, the Blue Beetle and the Woman in Red) — it had also become recognized, even within that simplistic, action-oriented genre, that greater injustice results when such restraints are removed.

Markstein continued:

Writer... Wolfman... and artist... Pérez... were fully aware of the ramifications when they introduced the character.... That's why Vigilante was the first such character in which the true consequences of such behavior were explored.... Vigilante meted out a great deal of justice — but also, through his ruthless disregard for the legal safeguards that protect us all, innocent and guilty, from simply being railroaded into prison whenever authorities suspect we may have committed a crime — a great deal of the opposite. But Adrian was, at his core, an honest man. When he realized he'd become what he most hated, he dealt with himself the same way he'd dealt with others. In the 50th issue (Feb 1988), he brought his series to a close by shooting himself dead.

== In other media ==
=== Television ===
- Variations of Adrian Chase appear in Arrow, portrayed by Josh Segarra.
  - The Earth-1 incarnation appears in the fifth season as an alias of Simon Morrison / Prometheus.
  - An Earth-2 doppelgänger of Chase appears as the Hood in the eighth season episode "Starling City". Oliver Queen encounters him while preparing for an impending Crisis and joins forces with him despite initial difficulties.
- Adrian Chase / Vigilante appears in Peacemaker, portrayed by Freddie Stroma. Chris Conrad served as a suit actor for the opening credits, first five episodes, and episode eight of the first season before the character was recast with Stroma following creative disagreements with James Gunn, with Stroma being considered for the role due to being the same height and physique as Conrad. This version is a busboy and self-proclaimed crimefighter who looks up to the eponymous Peacemaker and displays psychopathic and socially awkward tendencies. Moreover, he goes on to be a member of the 11th Street Kids and to help found Checkmate.
  - An alternate universe doppelgänger of Chase (additionally portrayed by Kellen Boyle) appears in the second season as a member of the Sons of Liberty.

=== Video games ===
The DCEU incarnation of Adrian Chase / Vigilante appears as a playable character in DC Worlds Collide.
