= Freddie Stroma =

British actor (born 1987)

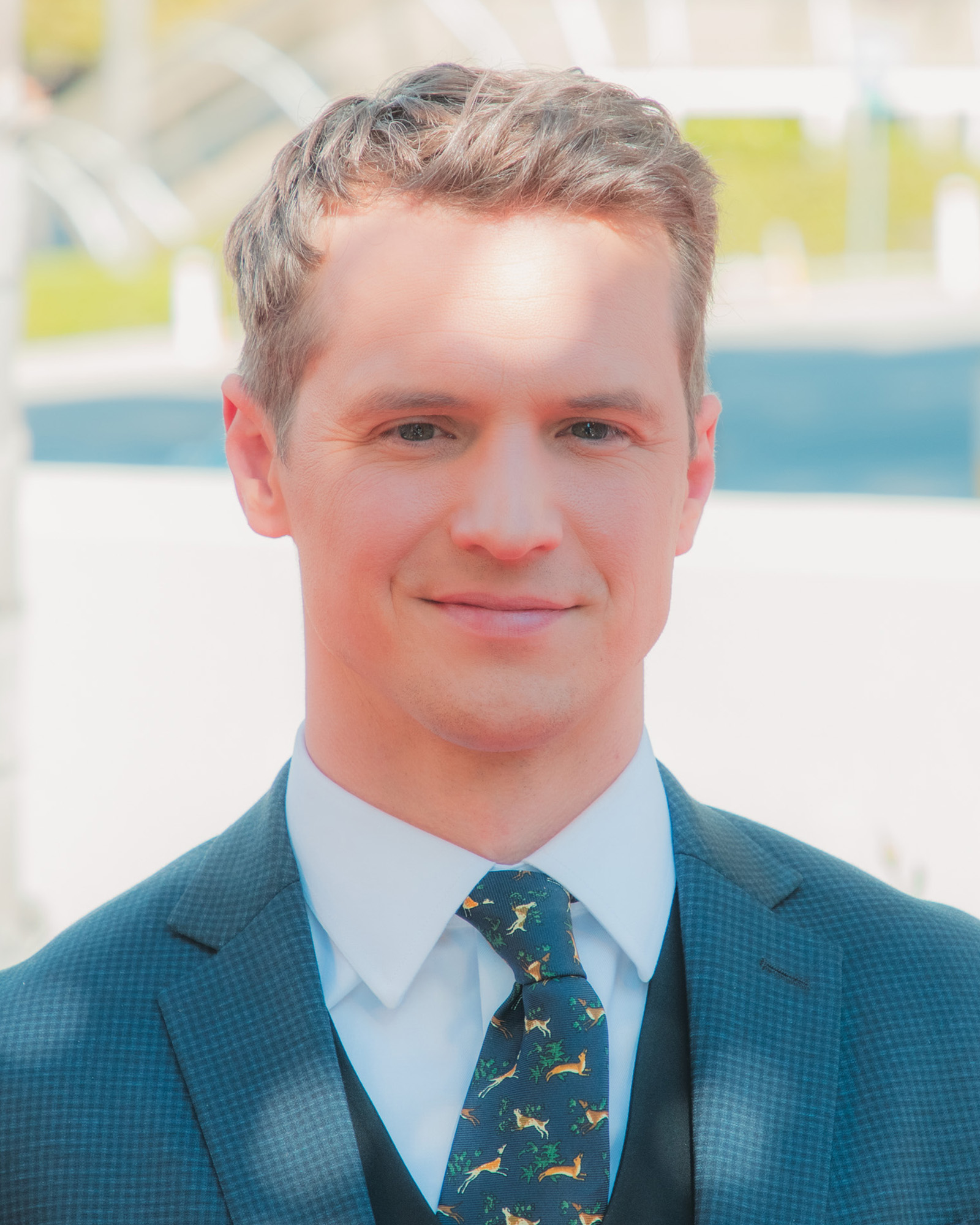
- Stroma in 2026
- Born: Frederic Wilhelm C. J. Sjöström; 8 January 1987 (age 39); London, England
- Education: Radley College; National Youth Theatre
- Alma mater: University College London (BSc)
- Occupation: Actor
- Years active: 2005–present
- Spouse: Johanna Braddy (m. 2016)

Frederic Wilhelm C. J. Sjöström (born 8 January 1987), known professionally as Freddie Stroma, is a British actor. He portrayed Cormac McLaggen in the Harry Potter film series, Adam Cromwell in the Lifetime series Unreal, Brit Vayner in 13 Hours: The Secret Soldiers of Benghazi (2016), H. G. Wells in the ABC series Time After Time, Luke in Pitch Perfect (2012) and Adrian Chase / Vigilante in the DC Universe series Peacemaker.

== Early life ==
Stroma was born 8 January 1987 in London, England, to father Stefan Sjöström, a Swedish computer industry executive, and German-French mother Crystal Kupper, and grew up in Ascot, England, in Berkshire, about 25 miles west of London. He was educated at Sunningdale School and the boys-only boarding school Radley College in Oxfordshire, leaving in 2005. He has an older sister, Antonia Sjöström, and a younger brother, Philipp Sjöström.

When he was 16, Stroma was accepted to the National Youth Theatre of Great Britain. He had roles on various British TV shows, including Casualty and BBC's detective show, Mayo (aka The Gil Mayo Mysteries). While studying neuroscience at University College London, Stroma continued to work as an actor and model. He took a year off from university to play the role of Cormac McLaggen in Harry Potter and the Half-Blood Prince. After filming was over, Stroma completed his degree at University College London. In 2009, he attained a 2:1 BSc (an upper-second-class degree) in Neuroscience.

== Career ==
During his time at university, Stroma was cast in the role as Cormac McLaggen first in Harry Potter and the Half Blood Prince, a role he reprised in Harry Potter and the Deathly Hallows – Part 1 and 2. In 2010, Stroma played the role of Cool Brett in the crime-thriller film 4.3.2.1.

In 2011, Stroma appeared in the direct-to-DVD romantic film A Cinderella Story: Once Upon a Song as a British student, Luke Morgan. He played opposite Katie Gibbs (played by Lucy Hale) as her love interest.

He had a minor role in Pitch Perfect, a 2012 comedy about the world of collegiate a cappella choirs. He played a radio station manager at the local college radio station.

In 2014, he was cast in the role of Jack in the psychological thriller After the Dark, which was formerly known as The Philosophers, with his former Harry Potter co-star Bonnie Wright. The film was shot on location in Jakarta.

In June 2015, Stroma was one of the romantic interests, Adam Cromwell, in the Lifetime dramedy Unreal. He plays British bachelor who is competing on a fictionalized The Bachelor-type reality show called Everlasting. Stroma's character is manipulated as much as the women who are vying for his attention in the show that is a behind-the-scenes view of reality dating shows.

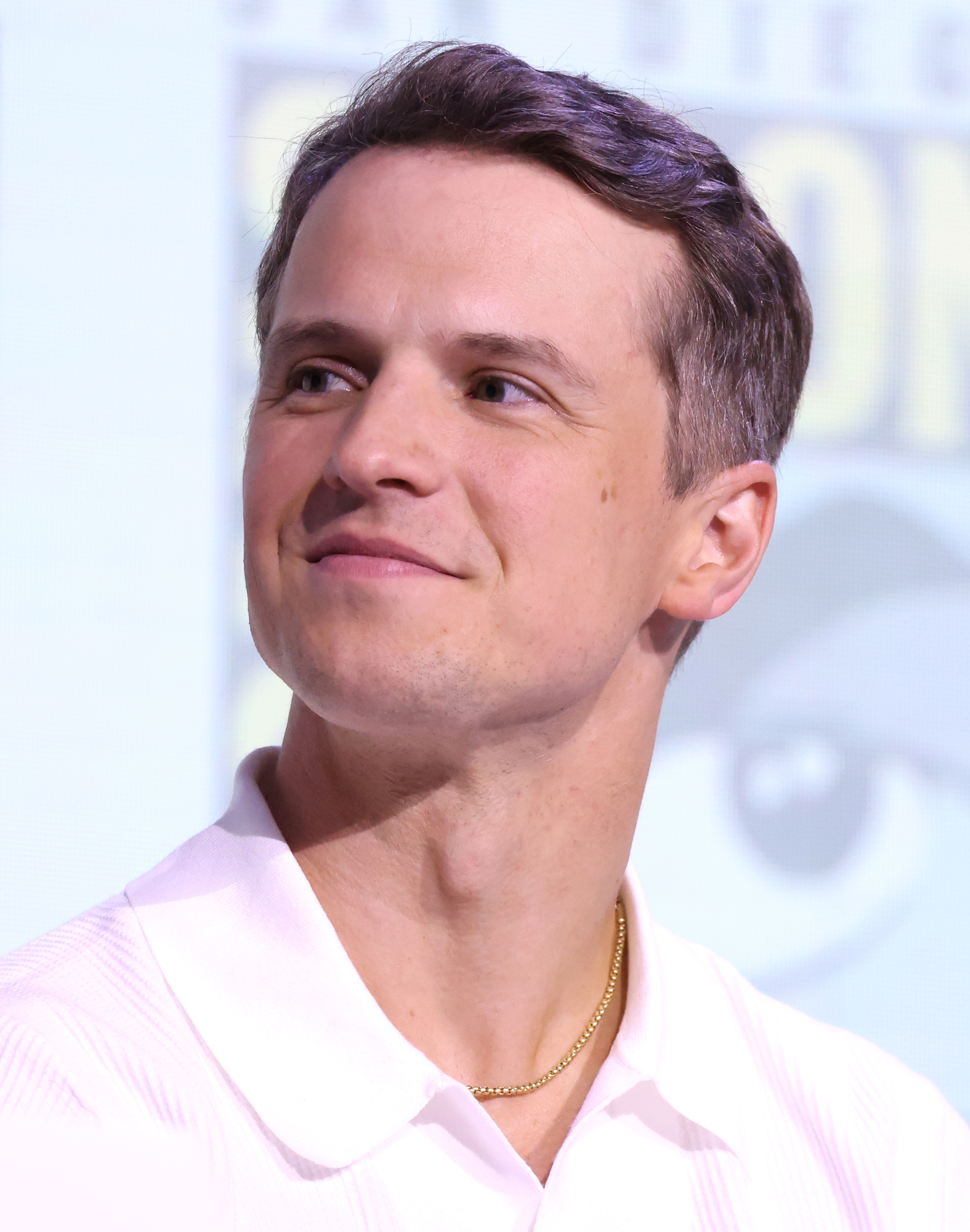
Stroma in 2025

Unreal was picked up for a second season but Stroma had said that he does not think his character will be back. However, during a Paley Center panel on Unreal he said that he is hopeful as the show will continue to feature Everlasting. After the season 1 finale, Sarah Gertrude Shapiro, one of the co-creators of Unreal, confirmed that Stroma would be back in season 2.

Stroma had a role in the Michael Bay film 13 Hours: The Secret Soldiers of Benghazi (2016), playing Yale University graduate student Brit Vayner, an undercover CIA officer in Libya.

In 2020, he played a guest role on Netflix's period drama Bridgerton, appearing as Prince Frederick of Prussia opposite Phoebe Dynevor and Regé-Jean Page.

Stroma replaced Chris Conrad in the role of Adrian Chase / Vigilante for the series Peacemaker after Conrad left the show after already filming five-and-a-half episodes of its first season. This required Stroma to reshoot all of Conrad's maskless scenes, while those of Conrad in the suit were kept with Stroma doing voiceovers. Following the conclusion of the second season in 2025, James Gunn announced there were no plans for a third season.

== Personal life ==
Stroma said he modelled (and acted) to help pay for university. He modelled for Acne Underwear in their Underwear Collection Autumn/Winter 2008. He uses Stroma as a surname instead of Sjöström because there is an NHL player named Fredrik Sjöström. Stroma plays guitar and can sing but he is not classically trained in either.

Stroma began dating his Unreal co-star Johanna Braddy in the summer of 2015. Stroma and Braddy became engaged in May 2016, and were married on 30 December 2016, in Atlanta, Georgia.

== Filmography ==
=== Film ===
Year	Title	Role	Notes
2008	Lady Godiva	Matt	
2009	Harry Potter and the Half-Blood Prince	Cormac McLaggen	
2010	4.3.2.1.	Cool Brett	
2010	Harry Potter and the Deathly Hallows – Part 1	Cormac McLaggen	
2011	Harry Potter and the Deathly Hallows – Part 2	Cormac McLaggen	
2011	A Cinderella Story: Once Upon a Song	Luke Morgan	Direct-to-video
2012	Pitch Perfect	Luke	
2013	After the Dark	Jack	
2014	Extraterrestrial	Kyle	
2014	The Inbetweeners 2	Ben Thorton-Wild	
2016	13 Hours: The Secret Soldiers of Benghazi	Brit Vayner	
2018	Second Act	Ron Ebsen	

=== Television ===
Year	Title	Role	Notes
2006	Mayo	Lucas Harper	Episode: "More Deaths than One"
2006	Casualty	James Huppert	Episode: "Happy Hour"
2007	The Last Flight to Kuwait	Gregor Schatz	Television film
2015–2016	Unreal	Adam Cromwell	Main role (season 1); guest (season 2)
2016	Game of Thrones	Dickon Tarly	Episode: "Blood of My Blood"
2017	Time After Time	H. G. Wells	Lead role
2019	Grand Hotel	Oliver	2 episodes
2020	Bridgerton	Prince Friedrich	3 episodes
2021	The Crew	Jake Martin	Main role
2022–2025	Peacemaker	Adrian Chase / Vigilante	Main role
2026	The Rookie	Dash’s Father	“Tiger Bear”

=== Audio dramas ===
Year	Title	Role	Notes
2023	Evergreen	Jeffrey Steinberg	9 episodes

=== Video games ===
Year	Title	Role	Notes
2009	Harry Potter and the Half-Blood Prince	Cormac McLaggen	

== Discography ==
Year	Song	Album
2011	"Knockin"	A Cinderella Story: Once Upon a Song
2011	"Possibilities"	A Cinderella Story: Once Upon a Song

== Awards and nominations ==
Year	Award	Category	Work	Result	Ref.
2022	Online Film & Television Association	Best Supporting Actor in a Comedy Series	Peacemaker	Nominated	
