= Sarah Gertrude Shapiro =

American filmmaker and television writer

Sarah Shapiro
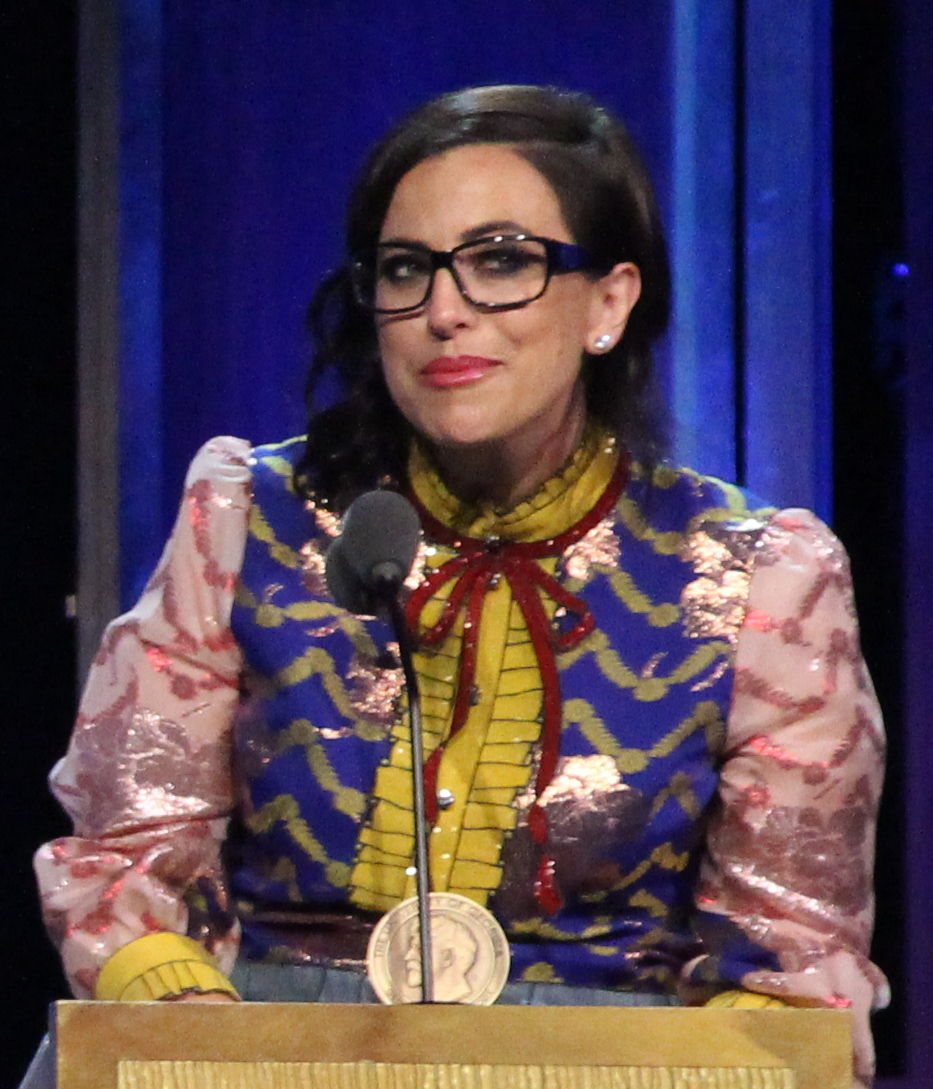
- Shapiro at the 75th Annual Peabody Awards
- Born: Santa Barbara, California US
- Education: Sarah Lawrence College
- Occupations: Writer; Director
- Years active: 2005-
- Known for: UnREAL

Sarah Gertrude Shapiro is an American filmmaker and television writer best known for co-creating the Lifetime television series UnREAL with Marti Noxon.

== Early life ==
Shapiro was born in Santa Barbara, California, to mother Diane Wolf (née Wallace) and father Perry Shapiro, a professor. She has a sister, Elizabeth Shapiro-Garza, who is an academic. Shapiro is Jewish and grew up celebrating the High Holidays and Passover.

Shapiro said she started writing when she was five years old, a book called Ergant Cries Ignored. At the age of 16, after attending a film class at Santa Barbara City College, Shapiro decided she wanted to be a director.

Shapiro graduated from Sarah Lawrence College in with a BA in Fiction Writing and Filmmaking.

== Career ==
After college, Shapiro interned at Christine Vachon's production company, Killer Films, and then worked for photographer David LaChapelle as a studio manager. In 2002, affected by the events of September 11 attacks and wanting to be closer to family, Shapiro moved to Los Angeles, California.

In Los Angeles, Shapiro found work on the reality TV show High School Reunion, unknowingly signing a contract with the production company that allowed them to move her to different shows at their discretion, and which committed Shapiro to "unlimited renewable options for perpetuity." Shapiro would eventually become a producer on The Bachelor TV franchise, a role she strongly disliked, but which would play an influential part in her later career. She worked on the show for four seasons over the course of two years, going from associate producer to field producer.

In 2005, seeking to leave reality television and end her restrictive non-compete employment contract (which was only effective in California), Shapiro moved to Portland, Oregon, where she worked at the advertising agency Wieden + Kennedy. Shapiro was familiar with Portland from having interned at Portland's Northwest Film Center during college, where she met filmmakers Miranda July and other local artists and filmmakers. Initially she planned to be a kale farmer.

At Wieden + Kennedy, Shapiro worked as a director, creating content in the form of short forms and documentaries. Wieden + Kennedy was an early supporter of her creative endeavors, allowing Shapiro to take leave and providing funding for a Kickstarter campaign for Sequin Raze. Shapiro worked on Sequin Raze, which she called a passion project, for four years while working at Wieden + Kennedy.

In 2012, she was one of eight women selected for the American Film Institute's Directing Workshop for Women (DWW), where she wrote and directed the short film Sequin Raze, starring Anna Camp, Ashley Williams, and Frances Conroy. The film went on to win Honorable Mention at South by Southwest Film Festival's Short Film Jury Awards as well as screenings at the New Directors/New Films Festival in New York (MoMA/Lincoln Center) and Palm Springs International film festival.

=== UnREAL ===
A mentor at the ad agency in Portland, Sally DeSipio, connected Shapiro with Lifetime, where she pitched the show without an agent, and was paired with writer Marti Noxon.

On July 30, 2013, Lifetime placed a pilot order on UnREAL, inspired by Sequin Raze. The pilot was written by Shapiro and Marti Noxon and was produced by A+E Studios. On February 6, 2014, UnREAL was green-lit, with a 10-episode series order, and premiered in June 2015.

Shapiro is credited as co-creator, writer, and supervising producer on the show. On July 6, 2015, the series was renewed for a second season of 10 episodes, to premiere in 2016. She spoke about the creation of the series in a lengthy 2016 profile with The New Yorker writer D.T. Max.

Shapiro's previous job working as a field producer on the American reality dating series The Bachelor was the inspiration behind both the short film as well as the Lifetime series. She talked about her journey navigating the world of Hollywood in an independent Tedx TED Conference.

== Other work ==
While attending Sarah Lawrence College, Shapiro formed the band The New England Roses with Brendan Fowler and JD Samson of indie band Le Tigre. During her time while working on The Bachelor, Shapiro was in a band called Mean Streak.

Shapiro is also a visual artist who created and wrote the music for a hand-animated film called I Wish I was an Animal, which was released on Doggpony Records.

== Filmography ==
- 2015–2016: UnREAL - TV series (executive producer, created by, written by, teleplay by)
- 2013: Sequin Raze - TV short (producer, director, writer)
- 2012: 2nd Best - short (director, writer)
- 2005: Battlegrounds: King of the Court - TV series documentary (story producer)
- 2002–2004: The Bachelor - TV show (associate producer, segment producer, field producer)
- 2003: High School Reunion - TV show (associate producer)
